= List of riots in India =

India has faced a number of protests and riots both before and after its independence. These incidents range from peaceful protests to ethnic agitations to violent communal riots. Here is a list of such incidents occurring in India:

== Riots in Pre-Independent India ==
Name	Year	Locations	Cause	Factions	Deaths	Wounded	Damage	Ref
Lat Bhairava Riots	1809	Benaras	Violence after Hindus attempted to worship at Lat Bhairava site	MuslimsHindus	Unknown	Unknown	Unknown	
Bombay Dog Riots	1832 (6 to 7 June)	South Mumbai	Protest by Parsis against the British government's killing of stray dogs	Parsis	None	None	N/A	
Parsi–Muslim riots	October 1851	Bombay	Protests by Muslims against the Chitra Dynan Darpan owned by a Parsee. The publication had printed a depiction of the Islamic prophet Muhammed and his history.	Parsis; Muslims	N/A	N/A	N/A	
1857 Bharuch riot	May 1857	Broach and Mumbai	Linked to the Broach riots	Parsis; Muslims	2 Parsis murdered	N/A	N/A	
Parsi–Muslim riots 1874	13 February 1874			N/A	N/A	N/A		
Salem riots of 1882	1882	Salem, Tamil Nadu	Objection by Muslims to a Hindu religious procession through a Mosque	Hindus; Muslims	Unknown	Unknown	N/A	
Shahabad Riots	1917	Shahabad, Bihar	Communal harmony disrupted due to the practice of cow slaughter on Eid al-Adha	Hindus, Muslims	Unknown	Unknown		
Katarpur Riot	1918	Saharanpur, Uttar Pradesh	Various	Hindus	Muslims	N/A		
Malabar rebellion	1920–1921	Malabar	Religious leaders spearheaded the Hindu genocide of 1921, which led to the massacre of thousands of Hindus, forcible conversions, rape of Hindu women and children and destruction of Hindu properties and places of worship, many call it Khilafat aftermath in the Malabar District of Madras Presidency.	Mappilas Hindus; British Raj				
Peshawar riots	March 21–24, 1910	Peshawar, Peshawar District, North-West Frontier Province	Annual Hindu festival of Holi coincided with Barawafat, the annual Muslim day of mourning.	Hindus; Muslims	At least 4 Muslims and 6 Hindus	Hundreds	At least 451 shops and homes, Rs. 50 lakhs of damage	(Note: "The date of the Hindu festival of Holi coincided with Barawafat, the Musalman day of mourning, in 1910, which led to a very serious riot between the Hindus and Musalmans of the Peshawar City resulting in a considerable loss of life. There was a wholescale plunder of Hindu houses and shops.") (Note: "On 22nd February 1910, a meeting of leading Muslims and Hindu leaders was called by deputy commissioner of Peshawar at the Municipal Hall in which arrangements regarding the upcoming festivals were discussed and a committee was established consisting of prominent leaders from both sides. It was decided in the meeting that the Holi should be celebrated quietly until the 25th March. There should be only two processions, namely from the Hindu quarter of Andar Shahr to that of Karimpura and vice-versa. The Muslim of the city should not join the procession and the troops should celebrate Holi in their lines and some leading men from both sides will supervise the arrangement at Hasting Memorial and other at Clock Tower.") (Note: On 21st March the Deputy Commissioner was informed by deputy superintendent of police Zain ul Abidin that the situation in the city is not good as Hindu brought some musicians from Amritsar and a dancing boy from Hari Pur and they are intending to lead the procession on an unauthorized route. The superintendent of police suggested the deputy commissioner that the Holi should not be allowed as the situations going to create clash. Mr. Blackway sent some Hindu leader to enquire the situation. These Hindu gentlemen assured the deputy commissioner that the situation is friendly and nothing bad is going to be happened. There is no musician with the Holi and it would follow the old route. At the same time some Muslim leaders reported to the deputy commissioner about the Muslim mob who intended to stop the Holi procession. They also suggested that Holi procession should be stopped to avoid an expected clash between the two communities. However, after the surety of the Hindu leaders that there are no musicians and dancing boys and that the procession is not going on an unauthorized route the deputy commissioner was stuck to follow his old plan. This was the point which was misunderstood and created communal violence in the city.) (Note: Around 8 pm when the Holi procession at Asa Mai gate was about to depart on the route to Pir Rathan Nath Dharamshala sub inspector Kanhya Lal who was posted at Chita Khuo informed the police head quarter that a mob of Muslim also assembled to stop it and the two mobs started abusing each other. Leaders from both sides tried to control the situation but the people from both sides refused to pay any heed to their leaders. Meanwhile, a Hindu Mahr Singh stabbed a Muslim with knife. Mahr Singh was chased by the mob and captured him at Bara Bazar. At the same time two Muslims Jani and Ahmad were killed by Hindu with knives. Police report for 21st March 1911, provides that two Muslim were killed and three wounded while from Hindu side two people were killed and eleven were wounded and eleven shops were broken.) (Note: When the funeral party was ousted from the city a riffraff of Muslim consisting of people from trans-border areas and Afghanistan remained in the city that started plundering and broke 285 shops. A violent clash was started in which two Hindus and one Muslim was killed... The next day on 23rd March the looting of shops started again. The first case was reported in Ramdas Bazar where the Muslim despite the Military and Police patrolling looted the Hindu shops. A Hindu, reader of Nawab of Landi fired and wounded two Muslim. The local Hindu during investigation denied the fact but Military intelligence reported that he fired and wounded two people. He was arrested and sent on trial under India Penal Code. Two Hindu were killed at Ram Das Bazar. It was also reported that in Mewa Mandi a mob of Afridi and Mohmand tribes started plundering and looted many shops. People from tribal areas were also involved in this looting. 11 shops were broken in Ram Das Bazar that day... The official records about the events of the day had self-contradictory statements. The starting paragraphs of police and commissioner reports claims that everything was good at the start of the day but after a while the situation was out of control in the whole city. For instance, police reports provides that around 10:00 am, in Karimpura a police constable Chettan Ram was struck on head and the mob at Bara Bazar started the slogan “Maro Hindu Ko”.)
1921–1922 riots	April 1921–March 1922	Bengal, Punjab, Multan	Many riots occurred during Muharram, other causes	Hindus; Muslims	Unknown	Unknown	Various	
Riots in Kohat	1924	Kohat	Hindu–Muslim tension	Hindus	300	Unknown	Rs. 9 lakhs + of damage	
1924–1925 riots	April 1924- March 1925	Delhi, Nagpur, Lahore, Lucknow, Moradabad, Bhagalpur, Gulbarga, Shahajahanpur, Kankinarah, Kohat and Allahabad	Various	Hindus; Muslims	Unknown	Unknown	Various	
1925–1926 riots	April 1925–March 1926	Calcutta, the United Provinces, the Central Provinces, Bombay Presidency, Berar, Gujarat, Sholapur, Aligarh	Dispute outside a mosque between Muslims and Hindus, other causes	Hindus; Muslims	44+	584+	Damage to temples and mosques	
1926–1927 riots	April 1926–March 1927	Delhi, Calcutta, Bengal, the Punjab, United Provinces, Bombay Presidency, Sind	Music during Hindu celebrations near mosques, and other causes	Hindus; Muslims	28+	226+	Unknown	
1927–1928 riots	April 1927- March 1928	Lahore, Bihar (2), Orissa(2), Punjab (2), Bettiah, United Provinces (10), Bombay Presidency (6), the Central Provinces (2), Bengal (2), Delhi(1)	Caused by the publication of Rangila Rasul and Risala Vartman, by music during Hindu celebrations near mosques, cow slaughter, and other causes	Hindus; Muslims	103+	1084+	Unknown	
1927 Nagpur riots	September 4, 1927	Nagpur, Maharashtra	Muslims objected to passage of Hindu procession which resulted in riots	Hindus; Muslims	22	100	N/A	
1928–1929 riots	April 1928–March 1929	22 significant riots in this period. Most serious were the Bombay riots. Other riots in Punjab, Kharagpur, and other places.	Many riots occurred during Bakr-i-Id, other causes	Hindus; Muslims	204+ (149 in Bombay)	Nearly 1000	Unknown	
1929–1930 riots	April 1929–March 1930	12 significant riots in this period. Bombay, other places.	Various	Hindus; Muslims	35+	200+	Unknown	
Bombay riots of 1930	1930	various	Protests against the Salt tax	Indian; British government	N/A	N/A	N/A	
1930–1931 riots	April 1930 – March 1931	Bengal, Nagpur, Bombay, Assam, Sukkur (Sind)	Various	Hindus; Muslims	Unknown	Unknown	Unknown	
1931–1932 riots	April 1931–March 1932	Cawnpore, other places	Various	Hindus; Muslims	300–500	Unknown	Damage to temples and other property	
1933–1934 riots	April 1933–March 1934	Benares, Cawnpore, Lahore, Peshawar, Ayodhya,...	During Hindu and Muslim celebrations. Dispute between Sikhs and Muslims at the Shaheed Ganj Mosque in Lahore. Riots in Karachi after Abdul Quayum was executed for the murder of Hindu writer Nathuramal in court.	Hindus, Sikhs; Muslims	Unknown	Unknown	Various	
1936 riots	1936	Firozabad, Bombay, other	Various	Hindus; Muslims	Unknown	Unknown	Various	
1937 riots	1937	Panipat, Madras, Amritsar	During Holi, other causes	Hindus, Sikhs; Muslims	Unknown	Unknown	Various	
1939 riots	1939	Benares, Cawnpore, Sukkur (Sind), other	Dispute between Muslims and Hindus at Manzilgah over a mosque, a temple vandalized by Muslims, other causes	Hindus; Muslims	151+	58+	Various	
1941 Dhaka riots	March 1941	Dhaka	During the Holi celebrations, coloured water accidentally fell on a burqa-clad Muslim woman	Hindus; Muslims	Unknown	Unknown	Various	
Direct Action Day	August 1946	Calcutta, Bengal	Muslim League Council to show the strength of Muslim feelings both to British and Congress. Muslims wanted a separate country for Muslims fearing that Hindus will suppress their community and that fear lead to killing and looting of Hindus.	Hindus; Muslims	4,000	N/A	100,000 homeless	
Noakhali riots	October–November 1946	Noakhali and Tippera districts of Bengal (now in Bangladesh)	Widespread killing and raping of Hindus and looting of Hindu shops, businesses, and homes. An attempt to either kill or make the Hindus flee from Noakhali and go to newly founded republic of India.	Hindus; Muslims	~200-285	N/A	50,000 remained marooned	
Rawalpindi Riots	March 1947	Rawalpindi Division, Punjab, British India	After the British announced departure from India by June 1948. On 5 March, Holi celebration was attacked by Muslims. Soon riots spread in nearby districts. The Muslim Mob went rampage committing arson, looting, massacre and rapes.District also witnessed a mass conversions to Islam.	Muslims Sikhs and Hindus	7,000-8,000 killed 400-500 women raped.	Unknown	80,000 forced to flee	

== Riots In Post-Independent India ==
=== From Independence to 2000 ===
Name	Year	Locations	Cause	Factions	Deaths	Wounded	Damage	Ref
1957 Ramnad riots	1957	Ramnad	After Devendrar people objected to electoral victory of Maravar candidate in 1957 Tamil Nadu Legislative Assembly by-elections	Devendrar; Maravar; Tamil Nadu police	38	Unknown	2,841 houses burnt	
1961 Jabalpur riots	4–9 February 1961	Jabalpur, Madhya Pradesh	This riot was linked to the emergence of a small class of successful Muslim entrepreneurs who created a new economic rivalry between Hindu and Muslim communities. Also, media and press gave communal tone to crime incident by two Muslim boys, which lead to widespread violence.	Hindus; Muslims	55	200+	These riots shook Jawaharlal Nehru as he never expected communal riots of such intensity in independent India. Hindu nationalist organizations including ABVP, Rashtriya Swayamsevak Sangh played a major role in this riot. Officially 55 were killed, though according to unofficial accounts, 200 were killed. Nehru responded by lambasting the Bhopal Congress government which was being headed by Chief Minister Kailash Nath Katju. He angrily noted that Congress leaders were found to be 'sitting inside their houses like purdah ladies' during riots	
1961 Aligarh riots	October 3, 1961	Aligarh, Uttar Pradesh	Rumor a Hindu student was killed on the campus of Aligarh University	Hindu and Muslim student organizations	14		"After the Jabalpur riots, which badly shook the Indian leadership and the Prime Minister, Jawaharlal Nehru, further violence flared up in Aligarh (Uttar Pradesh), just before the 1962 general elections. The city is famous for the Aligarh Muslim University (AMU), whose students are predominantly Muslim and which has claimed minority status for years. During the student-union elections of October 1961, not a single Hindu student was elected. Muslims held a victory procession, provoking counter-demonstrations by activists from the BJS (Bharatiya Jan Sangh, Indian People’s Alliance) and the ABVP. A clash subsequently broke out between Muslim and Hindu students in a university hostel. A rumor that a Hindu student had been killed on campus sparked off violence in the city on October 3. University employees were assaulted by students from the town’s Hindu colleges. The riot claimed 14 lives, mostly Muslim."	
1964 Calcutta riots	January 1964	Culcutta and rural parts of West Bengal	Retaliation for Muslim attacks on Hindus during 1964 East Pakistan riots	Hindus; Muslims	264	430+	The Muslim community in Calcutta felt more segregated and fearful than ever before. Reports indicated that as many as 70,000 residents fled their homes.	
1966 Hindu Sikh riots	9 March 1966	Delhi	March 14 Hindus and Sikhs battled in New Delhi's streets today as a wave of violence over proposals for a Punjabi-speaking state spread. Following violence in Delhi stoning and casual violence also erupted in Ludhiana, Patiala, Jalandhar and in Panipat 3 congressmen were burnt alive including close associate of Bhagat Singh generally believed to be orchestrated by Jan Sangh who were anti of Punjabi speaking state.	Sikhs Hindus	3 people died and around hundreds were injured,	N/A	N/A	
1967 Ranchi-Hatia riots	August 22–29, 1967	Ranchi	Anti-Urdu agitations	Hindus Muslims	184	Unknown	195 shops looted and burnt, three places of worship damaged by arson.	
1969 Gujarat riots	September – October 1969	Gujarat	Desecration of a dargah and subsequently of a Hindu temple.	Hindus; Muslims	512	1084	Property of Muslims worth 42 million Rupees destroyed	
1969 Anti-Kannada Riots	February – 1969	Bombay	KA-MH border dispute.	Kannadigas; Marathis	59	274	February 1969 Thackeray unleashes his goons against Kannadigas. 59 dead, 274 wounded, 151 cops injured in week of riots.	
Worli riots	1974	Mumbai, Maharashtra	Police attempting to disperse a Dalit Panthers rally where speaker allegedly made objectionable remarks about Hindu deities	Shiv Sena; Dalit	1			
1980 Moradabad riots	August 1980	Moradabad	Policemen's refusal to remove pig from Idgah	PAC; Muslims	400	Unknown	195 shops looted and burnt, three places of worship damaged by arson.	
1981 Bihar riots	May 1981	Bihar Sharif	Dispute over land between Yadavs (an agricultural caste) and Muslims .	Hindus; Muslims	45	70	N/A	
1982 Meerut riots	July 1982	Meerut	Dispute over land between Muslim advocate and Municipality .	Hindus; Muslims	100	126	N/A	
Nellie massacre	February 1983	Nellie	Kidnapping and murder of 5 Lalung tribals and alleged rape of two Lalung girls by Bengali Muslims. More broadly, Assam Agitation.	Assamese Bengali Muslims	2,191 (Unofficial Toll 10,000+)	Unknown		
1984 Bhiwandi riot	May 1984	Bhiwandi	Placement of Saffron flag on top of mosque.	Hindus; Muslims	278	1,115	N/A	
1984 Hyderabad riots	August–September 1984	Hyderabad	Religious procession during Ganesh Chathurti event in Old City caused violence .	Hindus Muslims	4	100	Mobs set fire to 100 shops and houses in the capital of Andhra Pradesh state	
1984 anti-Sikh riots	31 October 1984 − 3 November 1984	Delhi, Punjab, Haryana, Uttar Pradesh, Madhya Pradesh and Bihar	Assassination of Indira Gandhi by her two Sikh bodyguards	Congress party workers Sikhs	3,350 (Government figures) 8,000‐17,000 (Independent estimate)	N/A	N/A	
1985 Gujarat riots	February –August 1985	Ahmedabad	Anger among upper castes about proposed increases to reservation for backward classes. Later the riot turned communal and Bhartiya Janta Party and Vishwa Hindu Parishad workers attacked Muslims houses. Muslims who had no role to play in the reservation policy of Madhav Singh Solanki government were victimized.	Hindus; Muslims	275	N/A	N/A	
1986 Jammu and Kashmir riots	February–March 1986	Jammu and Kashmir	Construction of a mosque at the site of an ancient Hindu Temple	Hindus; Muslims			Hindu Temples, shops vandalised	
1987 Meerut riots	April–May 1987	Meerut	Babri Mosque reopened for Hindu worship	Hindus; Muslims; PAC	346 (includes 42 killed in Hashimpura massacre)	159	N/A	
1987 Delhi riots	19–22 May 1987	Delhi	Rumors about events happening in Meerut triggered communal violence in Delhi	Hindus; Muslims	8 – 15	N/A	N/A	
1988 Aurangabad violence	17–20 May 1988	Aurangabad	Objection to Election results	Hindus; Muslims	26	N/A	N/A	
1988 Muzaffarnagar	8–11 October 1988	Muzaffarnagar	Rally by the BMAC (Babri Masjid Action Committee)	Hindus; Muslims	37	N/A	N/A	
1988 Karnataka Bidar riots	14–16 September 1988	Bidar	Religious procession during Ganesh Chathurti event and over demanding donations from Sikhs	Sikhs (VHP)	6 Sikh students killed, 30 injured and	N/A	Property worth lakhs destroyed	
1989 Jammu anti-Sikh riots	13 January 1989	Jammu	Some Sikh pilgrims displaying Satwant Singh and Beant Singh posters during Guru Gobind Singh Jayanti	Sikhs; Congress party workers and Shiv Sena	15 Sikhs killed, hundreds injured and property worth crores destroyed	N/A	N/A	
1989 Bombay	24 February 1989	Bombay	Protests against book The Satanic Verses	Muslims	11	N/A	N/A	
1989 Kota violence	14 September 1989	Kota	Religious procession	Hindus; Muslims	26	N/A	N/A	
1989 Badaun violence	28 September 1989	Badaun	Issue of Urdu-slated to become Uttar Pradesh's second official language	Hindus; Muslims	24	N/A	N/A	
1989 Indore violence	14 October 1989	Indore	Political rally	Hindus; Muslims	23	N/A	N/A	
1989 Bhagalpur violence	22–28 October 1989	Bhagalpur	Religious procession and false rumors about the killing of Hindu students	Hindus; Muslims	1000+	N/A	N/A	
1989 Kashmir violence	1989–1990	Kashmir	Radical Islamist Militancy in valley	Militants; Muslims Kashmiri Hindus	200-1341		Exodus of Kashmiri Hindus	
1990 Gujarat violence	April–October 1990	Gujarat	Political procession	Hindus; Muslims	12	N/A	Looting of shops	
1990 Colonelganj violence	30 September 1990	Colonelganj	Stones and petrol bombs thrown at Durga Puja procession	Hindus; Muslims	100	N/A	Looting of shops	
1990 Karnataka violence	October 1990	Ramnagaram, Channapatna, Kolar, Davanagere, Tumkur	Various incidents in different parts of Karnataka state	Hindus; Muslims	46	N/A	N/A	
1990 Rajasthan violence	October 1990	Udaipur, Jaipur	Hindu Ram Jyoti procession (bearing the light of Ram) was stoned & attacked in Udaipur	Hindus; Muslims	50	N/A	N/A	
1990 Ayodhya firing incident	October, November 1990	Ayodhya	Uttar Pradesh police fired live ammunition at civilians	Hindus	16	N/A	N/A	
1990 Hyderabad riots	1990	Hyderabad	Due to Hindus partly demolishing Babri Mosque	Hindus; Muslims	200+	N/A	N/A	
1990 Aligarh riots	1990	Aligarh	Started with an attack on a group of people bound for Etah from the house of Manawwar Hussain, ex- chairman of the Nagar Palika, and from a nearby Masjid	Hindus; Muslims	11+	Unknown	Unknown	
1990 Kanpur riots	1990	Kanpur	Hawkers selling clothes were attacked and their merchandise burned	Hindus; Muslims	20	N/A	N/A	
1990 Agra riots	1990	Agra	Unknown	Hindus; Muslims	22	N/A	N/A	
1990 Gonda riots	1990	Gonda	Throwing of stones and petrol bombs at a Durga Puja procession	Hindus; Muslims	Unknown	Unknown	Unknown	
1990 Khurja violence	1990; December 15–23 and 1991; January 31–February 5	Khurja	Babri Masjid/Ramjanmabhoomi issue	Hindus; Muslims	96	N/A	N/A	
1991 Bhadrak riot	1991; March 24	Bhadrak	Babri Masjid/Ramjanmabhoomi issue	Hindus; Muslims	33	N/A	N/A	
1991 Saharanpur violence	1991; March 27	Saharanpur	Ram Navami procession was prevented from passing near a mosque	Hindus; Muslims	40+	N/A	N/A	
1991 Kanpur violence	1991; May 19	Kanpur	Babri Masjid/Ramjanmabhoomi controversy	Hindus; Muslims	20	N/A	N/A	
1991 Meerut violence	1991; May 20	Meerut	Election violence	Hindus; Muslims	30	N/A	N/A	
1991 Varanasi violence	1991; November 8 and 13	Meerut	Kali Puja procession attacked	Hindus; Muslims	20	N/A	N/A	
1991 anti-Tamil violence in Karnataka	1991	Bangalore	Tensions between Kannadigas and Tamils after Cauvery river dispute	Kannadigas Tamils	16	N/A	Officially 16 Tamils were killed but real estimate is much higher and Mass exodus of Tamils, more than 200,000 from various parts of Karnataka	
1992 Sitamarhi violence	1992; October 2–9	Sitamarhi	Durga Puja procession shouting slogans such as Jai Shri Ram near a mosque was stopped by some Muslim youths	Hindus; Muslims	65	N/A	N/A	
1992 Surat	1992; October 2–9	Surat	Babri Masjid/Ramjanmabhoomi controversy	Hindus; Muslims	200+	N/A	N/A	
1992 Bombay riots	6 December 1992 – 26 January 1993	Mumbai	Protests over the demolition of the Babri Masjid	Hindus; Muslims	900			
1992 Karnataka	1992; December 6–13	Bangalore, Gulbarga, Hubli, Dharwad	Commencement of Urdu-language news broadcasts in Doordarshan	Hindus; Muslims	30	N/A	N/A	
1992 Kanpur	1992; December 6–11	Kanpur	Demolition of Babri Masjid	Hindus; Muslims	254	N/A	N/A	
1992 Assam	1992; December 7–8	Nagaon and Dhubri districts	Demolition of Babri Masjid	Hindus; Muslims	90+	N/A	As many as 23 temples and mosques were damaged	
1992 Rajasthan	1992; December 7–9	Rajasthan	Demolition of Babri Masjid	Hindus; Muslims	60	N/A	N/A	
1992 Calcutta	1992; December 7–1	Calcutta	Demolition of Babri Masjid	Hindus; Muslims	35	N/A	N/A	
1992 Bhopal	1992; December 7–15	Bhopal	Demolition of Babri Masjid	Hindus; Muslims	175	N/A	N/A	
1992 Delhi	1992; December 10	Delhi	False rumor declaring the Mustafa mosque had been razed to the ground triggered the violence	Hindus; Muslims	53	N/A	N/A	
1994 Hubli	1994; August 15	Hubli	National flag hoisting at the Idgah Maidan Hubli	Hindus; Muslims	6	N/A	N/A	
1994 Bangalore	1994; October 6–8	Bangalore	Broadcasting in Urdu of a Doordarshan (television) program	Hindus; Muslims	25	N/A	N/A	
1997 Coimbatore riots	1997; November 29–December 1; 1998; February 14	Coimbatore	Murder of a police constable by three Muslim youths belonging to the Al-Umma	Hindus; Muslims	60	N/A	N/A	

=== Post 2000 ===
Name	Year	Locations	Cause	Factions	Deaths	Wounded	Damage	Ref
2002 Gujarat riots	27 February – 2 March 2002	Gujarat	The burning of a train in Godhra on 27 February 2002, which caused the deaths of 69 Hindu pilgrims karsevaks returning from Ayodhya triggered the violence. The Naroda Patiya massacre took place on 28 February 2002 at Naroda, in Ahmedabad. 97 Muslims were killed by a mob of approximately 5,000 people .	Hindu; Muslims	1044 Official Figure, 2000 Unofficial	2500+ official		
2005 Mau riots	2005; October 13–14	Mau	Hindus performing the Ramayana scene of Bharat Milap attacked by Muslims	Hindus; Muslims	14	N/A	N/A	
2005 Lucknow riots	2006, March 3	Lucknow	Danish Mohammed cartoons	Hindus; Muslims	4	N/A	N/A	
2006 Vadodara riots	1 May 2006 – 3 May 2006	Gujarat	Municipal council's decision to remove the dargah (shrine) of Syed Chishti Rashiduddin	Hindus; Muslims	8	42		
2007 Christmas violence in Kandhamal	2007, Dec 24–27	Kandhamal district	Christmas celebrations	Hindus, Christians		3-50	100+ Churches burnt down, demolished or vandalized, 100+ Christian institutions burnt down or vandalized, 837+ families left homeless, 700-730 houses (120 belonging to Hindus) were burnt or damaged.	
2008 Kandhamal violence	2008, Aug 25–28	Kandhamal district	Murder of Lakshmanananda Saraswati	Hindus, Christians	39-90	18,000+	395+ Churches burnt down, demolished or vandalized, 54,000+ left homeless, 5,600+ houses ransacked or burnt down, 600+ Villages ransacked	
2008 Indore (Madhya Pradesh)	2008, July 3–4	Indore	Conflict revocation of land allotment for the Amarnath Temple in Kashmir	Hindus; Muslims	8	N/A	N/A	
Miraj Riots	September 2009	Miraj	Muslim objected against a statue of Shivaji Maharaj					
2012 Assam violence	20 July – 15 September 2012	Assam	Killing of 4 Bodo youths by unidentified miscreants	Bodos, Bengali Muslims	77+		4 lakhs displaced temporarily	
2013 Canning riots	21 February 2013	West Bengal	Killing of Muslim cleric by unidentified assailants	Muslims Hindus			200 Hindu homes burnt.	
2013 Muzaffarnagar riots	27 August 2013 – 17 September 2013	Muzaffarnagar district, Uttar Pradesh	Disputed	Hindus; Muslims	60+	93		
2014 Saharanpur riots	25 July 2014 – 26 July 2014	Saharanpur	Disputed land	Muslims; Sikhs	3	33		
2015 Nadia riots	5 May 2015	Nadia district, West Bengal	The Hindu procession returning from Dharmaraj Mela attacked from Mosque by Muslims.	Muslims; Hindus	4	8	Houses burnt	
2016 Kaliachak riots	3 January 2016	Kaliachak, Malda district	Muslim protest against the alleged derogatory remarks towards Muhammad .	Muslims Hindus and police	0	30+	500 homes torched, destruction of police stations and Hindu temples	
2016 anti-Tamil riots	13-14 September 2016	Bengaluru	Tensions between Kannadigas and Tamils after Cauvery river dispute	Mob, Public	2 protesters because of police firing	N/A	100+ cars, buses, trucks and shops belonging to Tamilians torched in Bangalore thousands of Tamil people flee the city as violence engulfed and ravaged the city	
2016 Coimbatore riots	September 22 – 26	Coimbatore	Death of Munnani leader	Police Munnani supporters		12	Destruction of police vans, Muslim-owned properties, Hindu temples	
2016 Dhulagarh riots	12 December 2016	Panchla, Howrah	Refusal to allow Mawlid processions to march	Hindus; Muslims				
2017 Baduria riots	2 July 2017	Baduria, West Bengal	Alleged derogatory Facebook post by a Hindu student	Muslims; Hindus		23+	65 year old Hindu man stabbed to death by a Muslim mob.	
2017 Northern India riots	25 August 2017	Haryana, Punjab, Uttar Pradesh, Rajasthan and New Delhi	Rape conviction of Gurmeet Ram Rahim Singh	Dera Sacha Sauda Followers	41+	300+	Mostly in Police firing to suppress the Destruction.	
2018 Bihar riots	17 March 2018, 24 March 2018, 25 March 2018, 27 March 2018, 28 March 2018 & 30 March 2018	Bihar (17 March Bhagalpur, 24 March Siwan, 25 March Aurangabad, 27 March Samastipur, 27 March Munger, 28 March Silao(Nalanda), 28 March Sheikhpura, 30 March Nawada)	Clashes erupted during Ram Navami processions between Hindus and Muslims	Hindus Muslims	0	35+	4 Hindu temples vandalized including the Hanuman idols and murtis inside of them broken and one mosque also vandalised, vehicles, shops were burnt	
2020 Delhi riots	23 February 2020 – 1 March 2020	North East Delhi	CAA-NRC Protests	Muslims, Hindu	53	200+	Shops, houses vehicles and mosque	
2020 Bangalore riots	11–12 August 2020	KG Halli and DJ Halli, eastern Bengaluru	Protest by Muslims against a derogatory social media post about Muhammad.	Muslims Police	5	Unknown	Homes, shops, vehicles and police station	
2021 Assam eviction violence	24 September 2021	Dholpur, Darrang district	Eviction drive against alleged illegal settlers	Assam police, Illegal settlers	2	9 policemen injured	2 people shot dead by police including 12-year-old boy	
2022 Shivamogga riots	20 February 2022 – 22 February 2022	Shivamogga, Karnataka	Murder of Bajrang Dal activist Harsha	Bajrang Dal workers Muslims	0	20 injured	100 vehicles torched, Houses and shops vandalised	
2022 Kanpur violence	3 June 2022	Kanpur, Uttar Pradesh	2022 Muhammad remarks controversy	Muslims Police	0	40+ injured		
2022 Ranchi violence	10 June 2022	Ranchi, Jharkhand	2022 Muhammad remarks controversy	Muslims Police	2	24 injured		
2023 Serampore violence	2 April 2023 - 5 April 2023	Eastern parts of Hooghly district of West Bengal	Passing of Ram Navami procession, where two communities clashed between each other.	Hindu and Muslim communities	0	12	Railway station, government properties, roads, buildings, schools etc.	
2023–2025 Manipur violence	3 May 2023 – present	Meitei and Kuki-dominated districts of Manipur	Various: Attempt to give Meiteis ST reservation, Manipur govt crackdown on land encroachment, Meitei fears of illegal immigration	Meiteis Kukis	60+	230+	Churches, temples, schools, houses, vehicles, public properties were set ablaze by the violent protesters.	
2023 Haryana riots	31 July 2023 - 3 August 2023	Nuh, later Gurgaon and Sohna	Passage of Hindu procession with rumoured participation of Monu Manesar, a cow vigilante known for murder of several Muslims	Meo Muslims Hindus	7	200+	Mosque and public properties were set ablaze by the violent mobs.	
2023 Shivamogga violence	28 September 2023 - 3 October 2023	Shimoga	Cutout of Tipu Sultan being covered by police for being inciteful	Muslims police	0	230+	Murders, attacking innocent people, police and public properties were set ablaze by the violent protesters.	
2023 Satara riots	10 September 2023	Satara	Riots by Hindus who were provoked by abusive comments made by Muslims against Hindu deities Lord Ram & Lady Sita, as well as against the Maratha ruler Shivaji Maharaj	Hindus Muslims	1	10	Shops, houses vehicles and mosques burned or targeted	
2024 Sandeshkhali violence	5 January 2024	Sandeshkhali	After a team of ED officers were injured in clashes with supporters of a TMC leader Shahjahan Sheikh	Local residents(Mainly women)			Women protesters set fire to three poultry farms belonging to one of Sheikh's associates.	
2024 Haldwani riots	9 February 2024	Haldwani	Demolition of an illegal madrasa and Masjid as part of a district anti-encroachment drive	Local residents (mainly Muslim) Police	5	100+	Police station, vehicles, and houses burnt	
2024 Bahraich violence	October 2024	Bahraich	Communal violence between the Hindus and the Muslims following heated argument over taking procession into a minority-dominated area	Hindus and Muslims			arson	
2024 Sambhal violence	November 2024	Sambhal	Violence erupted during a court-ordered to survey of the Shahi Jama Masjid, a 500-year old mosque in Sambhal, protected by ASI	Hindus and Muslims				
2025 Nagpur violence	March 2025	Nagpur	Communal clashes erupted following protest over Aurangzeb's tomb	Hindus and Muslims	1	30+ injured	60+ vehicles vandalised, 105 arrested.	
2025 Murshidabad Violence	April 2025	Murshidabad	Anti Waqf Amendment Bill turned violent	Muslims	3	10	Shops vandalised and robbed	

== See also ==
- List of massacres in India
- Religious violence in India
- List of riots in Mumbai
