= 2024 Sambhal violence =

Religious tensions over a mosque survey in Uttar Pradesh, India

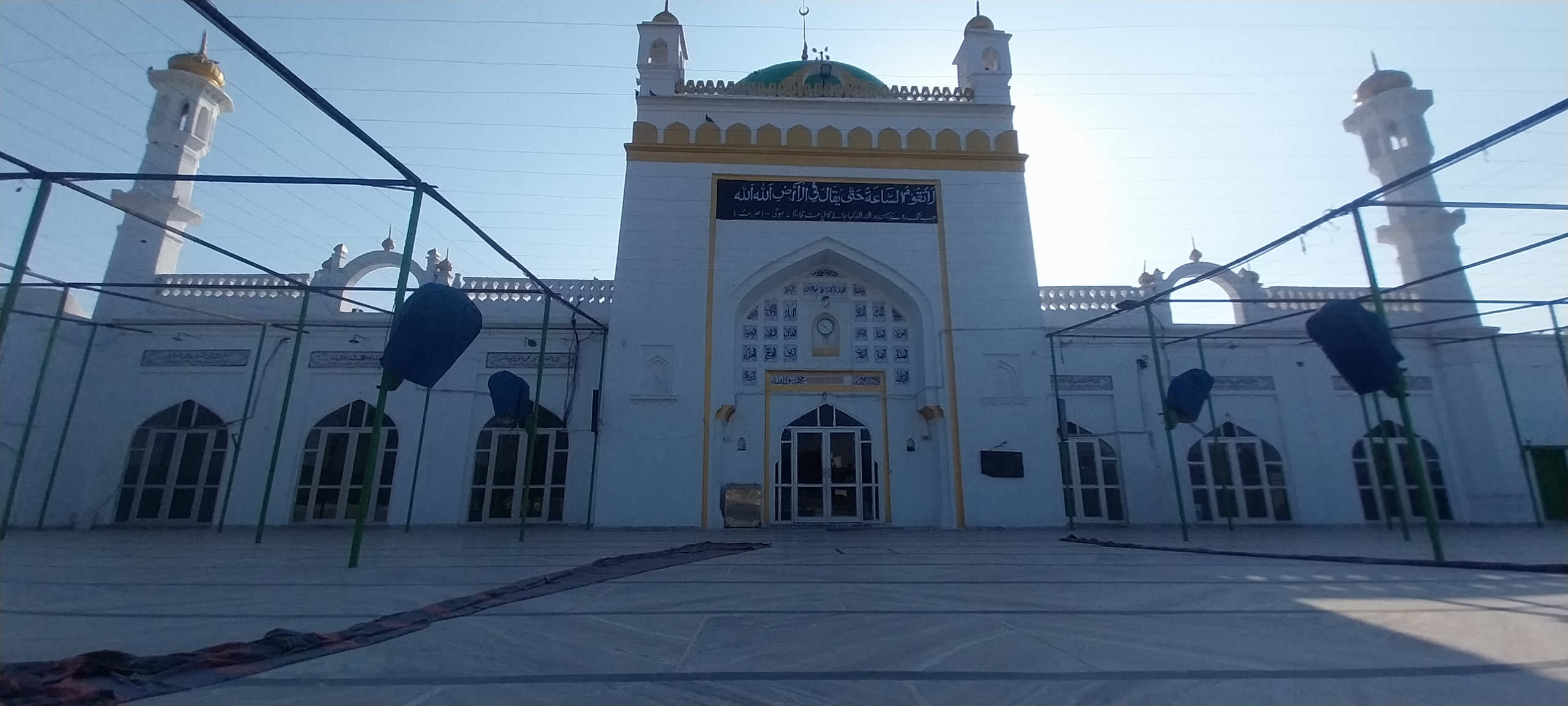

- Sambhal (Uttar Pradesh) Sambhal (India)
- Location: Shahi Jama Masjid, Sambhal, Uttar Pradesh, India
- Date: November 24, 2024
- Deaths: 5
- Injuries: 30
- Motive: Dispute over mosque due to a court-ordered survey.

On 24 November 2024, violence erupted during a court-ordered Archaeological Survey of India (ASI) survey of the Shahi Jama Masjid, a 500-year old mosque in Sambhal, protected by ASI, in the Indian state of Uttar Pradesh. The survey was initiated following claims that the mosque was constructed on the ruins of a Hindu temple allegedly demolished during the Mughal period. While the first survey had proceeded peacefully, tension escalated during the second survey when the wuzu khana (ablution tank) used before prayer in the mosque, had been drained, allegedly to check the depth, leading to rumours of the mosque being dug up. The President of the Masjid committee tried to convince people that the mosque was not being broken. While some were reassured and left, others remained enraged.

The incident resulted in the deaths of five Muslims. Scores of others, including around 20 security personnel, were injured.

== Events ==
The Shahi Jama Masjid, located in Sambhal, has been at the center of dispute following claims that it was constructed on the ruins of a Shri Hari temple allegedly demolished by the Mughal ruler Babur in the early 16th century. In response to a petition filed by a group of Hindu plaintiffs, led by lawyer Hari Shankar Jain, Vishnu Shankar Jain and Hindu seer Mahant Rishiraj Giri, as part of a civil suit claiming right for access into the mosque. the Sambhal civil court ordered a survey of the mosque premises. The survey was conducted under the supervision of an advocate commissioner, district magistrate, and police. The survey aimed to investigate claims that the mosque was built over a demolished Hindu temple.

The ASI submitted a response in the court, and raised concerns that unauthorized changes to the mosque's structure by the management committee are unlawful and should be restricted.

The mosque is a protected monument, designated as such under the Ancient Monuments Protection Act, 1904, where worship is not allowed to preserve its historical integrity. The Hindu side's lawyer claimed that confusion over the routine draining of an ablution tank during the survey sparked tensions, leading to the belief among those gathered outside that excavation was taking place.

The opposition MPs have made allegations that some people accompanying the court-appointed survey commission at the mosque chanted “Jai Shri Ram” to provoke Muslims, in the presence of senior police and district officials, with a video of the incident posted by Akhilesh Yadav. Opposition MPs in Uttar Pradesh claimed police highhandedness contributed to the mob violence, which claimed five lives, and called for the Supreme Court to investigate the administration’s role.

While the state Chief Minister Yogi Adityanath said in the state assembly that the survey was conducted peacefully for the first two days but "provocative speech" during Friday prayers spoiled the atmosphere and led to violence.

== Reactions ==
The Samajwadi Party (SP) criticized the Uttar Pradesh government and the BJP over the survey. SP spokesperson Ameeque Jamei accused the BJP of provoking unrest for political gains. He said, "The Sambhal police and administration, along with the BJP, have been provoking people in the Shahi Masjid issue in the name of an ASI survey. This comes a day after the BJP claimed that it got Muslim votes in Kundarki. Is this the reward that the BJP is giving for Kundarki? What does the Places of Worship Act, 1991, say... barring the Babri Masjid and Ram Mandir issue, no other structure will be touched or changed... Exactly after the elections, the BJP has started its game once again. This game of BJP is not good for the integrity of this nation; BJP is trying to divide society."

== Aftermath ==
The Uttar Pradesh administration imposed Section 144 of the Criminal Procedure Code in Sambhal to prevent further gatherings and potential violence. Investigations were launched to determine the causes and handling of the unrest.

After the violence, 25 people were taken into custody and seven cases were filed against 2,500 people. Those charged include Zia ur Rahman Barq, MP of Sambhal from Samajwadi Party, and Nawab Suhail Iqbal, the son of Iqbal Mehmood, a party associate. The accused in the violence would be booked under the stringent National Security Act (NSA).

On November 29, 2024, the Supreme Court directed the Sambhal Trial Court to pause proceedings against the Shahi Jama Masjid until the Allahabad High Court hears the Masjid Committee's challenge to a survey order. The Court ordered the survey report to remain sealed and emphasized maintaining peace in the region.

The Uttar Pradesh government constituted a three-member judicial commission, chaired by former Allahabad High Court judge Devendra Kumar Arora, to investigate the violence. The commission visited Sambhal on 1 December, inspecting the affected areas to determine whether the incident was spontaneous or the result of a premeditated criminal conspiracy.

On March 23, 2025 Police arrested the Shahi Jama Masjid committee president and senior lawyer Zafar Ali in connection with the November 24 violence according to the police. On March 24, 2025 A section of lawyers in Sambhal staged a pen-down protest against the arrest of Zafar Ali. On March 27, 2025 a district court dismissed the interim bail application of Ali and scheduled his regular bail petition for April 2. On April 2, 2025 the bail hearing was rescheduled to April 4 due to the unavailability of the case diary. On 16 April 2025 multiple news outlets reported that Zafar Ali had secured bail in two earlier cases registered against him. On May 9, 2025 it was reported that Zafar Ali has moved to Allahabad High court for his bail application after a lower court had rejected his bail application. Zafar Ali was granted bail on 24 July 2025 by Allahabad High court.

On April 4, 2025 three men were detained by police while attempting to enter the Shahi Jama Masjid in Sambhal to perform a Hindu fire ritual.

== See also ==
- Anti-Mosque campaign in India
- 2020 Delhi riots
- 2024 Bahraich violence
- Ayodhya dispute
