= Hate speech laws in India =

The hate speech laws in India aim to prevent discord among its many ethnic and religious communities. The laws allow a citizen to seek the punishment of anyone who shows the citizen disrespect "on grounds of religion, race, place of birth, residence, language, caste or any other ground whatsoever". Section 153A of the Indian Penal Code prohibits citizens from creating disharmony or feelings of enmity, hatred or ill-will between different groups of people.

== The Constitution ==
The Constitution of India does not provide for a state religion. Article 25(1) states, "Subject to public order, morality and health and to the other provisions of this Part, all persons are equally entitled to freedom of conscience and the right freely to profess, practise and propagate religion". Article 19 gives all citizens the right to freedom of speech and expression but subject to "reasonable restrictions" for preserving inter alia "public order, decency or morality". Article 28 prohibits any religious instruction in any educational institution wholly maintained out of state funds.

== Laws restricting the freedom of expression ==
India prohibits hate speech by several sections of the Indian Penal Code, the Code of Criminal Procedure, and by other laws which put limitations on the freedom of expression. Section 95 of the Code of Criminal Procedure gives the government the right to declare certain publications “forfeited” if the “publication ... appears to the State Government to contain any matter the publication of which is punishable under Section 124A or Section 153A (Sec.196 BNS) or Section 153B (Sec.197 BNS) or Section 292 (Sec.294 BNS) or Section 293 (Sec.295 BNS) or Section 295A of the Indian Penal Code” (Sec.299 BNS).

=== Section 153A (Section 196 of BNS) ===
Section 153A of the Indian penal code says now Bhartiya Nayaya Sanhita Section 196 (BNS) , inter alia:

Whoever (a) by words, either spoken or written, or by signs or by visible representations or otherwise, promotes or attempts to promote, on grounds of religion, race, place of birth, residence, language, caste or community or any other ground whatsoever, disharmony or feelings of enmity, hatred or ill-will between different religious, racial, language or regional groups or castes or communities, or (b) commits any act which is prejudicial to the maintenance of harmony between different religious, racial, language or regional groups or castes or communities, and which disturbs or is likely to disturb the public tranquillity, . . . shall be punished with imprisonment which may extend to three years, or with fine, or with both.

=== Section 295A (Section 299 of BNS) ===
Section 295A of the Indian Penal Code (IPC) (now Section 299 Bhartiya Nyaya Sanhita of 2023 ) enacted in 1927 says:

Whoever, with deliberate and malicious intention of outraging the religious feelings of any class of [citizens of India], [by words, either spoken or written, or by signs or by visible representations or otherwise], insults or attempts to insult the religion or the religious beliefs of that class, shall be punished with imprisonment of either description for a term which may extend to [three years], or with fine, or with both.

Legislative history of Section 295A

A book, Rangila Rasul, was published by Rajpal Malhotra in 1924. The book concerned the marriages and sex life of Muhammad. On the basis of a complaint, the publisher was arrested and brought to trial twice, but was acquitted both times because there was no law in force at the time prohibiting insult to religion. As the book was deemed to not have been published with the specific intent to cause enmity or hatred between different religious communities, under Section 153A it was deemed a legal publication. The Indian Muslim community demanded a law against insult to religious feelings, as they understood that Section 153A did not offer this protection. Hence, the British Government enacted Section 295A in 1927. The Select Committee, before enactment of the law, stated in its report that the purpose was to punish persons who indulge in wanton vilification or attacks upon other religions or their religious figures. They did account for the fact that a writer could provide an insulting treatment of a religion as a deliberate provocation in order to facilitate social reform and recommended that the words with deliberate and malicious intention be inserted in the Section accordingly. This law was enacted during the ongoing trials of Rajpal Malhotra but was not retroactive, so he was ultimately freed in 1928.

The publisher, having survived two previous assassination attempts, was murdered by Ilm-ud-din in his own publishing shop in 1929. As a result, Ilm-ud-din was arrested, tried and executed despite appeals submitted by Muhammad Ali Jinah, who would later found Pakistan. After his execution Ilm-ud-din was considered by some members of his religion, especially those in the areas which would eventually become Pakistan, as a martyr and mentioned with honorifics such as 'Ghazi' and 'Shaheed'.

== Case List ==
=== Accused arrested or censored, Court Verdict Guilty ===
In 1957, Supreme Court upheld decision of lower court. Lower court found publisher Ramji Lal Modi guilty of publishing a cartoon and article which insults religious beliefs of Muslims. He was sentenced to 12 months imprisonment and fined under IPC 295A (Sec.299 BNS). Petitioner argued that IPC 295A (Sec.299 BNS) violated freedom of speech and expression guaranteed under Article 19 (1)(A) of the Constitution and offense of insulting religious beliefs can be committed if there is no danger of public disorder.

In 1961, Supreme court found Henry Rodrigues guilty of insulting religious beliefs of the Roman Catholics, and acting with a malicious intention in publishing and printing the same in 'Crusader' magazine. The defendant, who was a Roman Catholic, stated that he had criticized certain practices and beliefs of the Roman Catholic Church, which were contrary to what had been stated in the Holy Bible. He further stated that similar views have been expressed in many other well-known work. He was sentenced to pay a fine of Rs. 200/-and in default of payment of fine, to undergo simple imprisonment for one month.

In 1960, the Supreme Court upheld a decision of Uttar Pradesh government to forfeit all six books written by Baba Khalil Ahamad because it contained derogatory reference to Muawiya, who was governor of Syria and contemporary of Mohammad, which outrages the religious feelings of Sunni Muslim community.

In 1984, Supreme court uphold decision of Bihar government to forfeit all the copies of book 'Vishwa Itihas (Pratham Bhag)' on the ground that it contained derogatory reference to Mohammad which outraged the religious feelings of the Muslim community. The petitioner, who is publisher, argued that author has relied on the authoritative historical works like the "Outline of History" by RG., Wells, the "Muhamad at Madina" by W.M.G. Watt and the "Middle East" by S.N. Fisher etc. In discussing the Muhammadan religion he had used his dispassionate expertise as a teacher of history and in fact had praised Mohammad when there was occasion to do so.

In 2007, R.V. Bhasin's Islam - A Concept of Political World Invasion by Muslims was banned, and house raided, in Maharashtra on grounds that it outrages the feelings of Muslim section of society. In January 2010, the Bombay High upholds the ban imposed by the Government of Maharashtra.

In October 2022, a court in Uttar Pradesh (UP) found Samajwadi Party leader Azam Khan guilty of hate speech for his comments against UP Chief Minister Yogi Adityanath in 2019. Khan was charged for a provocative speech against Adityanath and IAS officer Aunjaneya Kumar Singh, then District magistrate.

=== Accused arrested or censored, Court Verdict unknown or not-guilty ===
In 1932, some Muslim clerics denounced a young woman physician named Rashid Jahan, and threatened her with disfigurement and death. She and three others had published a collection of Urdu short stories called Angarey in which they had robustly criticized obscurantist customs in their own community and the sexual hypocrisies of some feudal landowners and men of religion. Under section 295A, the authorities banned the book and confiscated all copies.

In 1933, police arrested Dr. D'Avoine under section 295A for publishing his article "Religion and Morality", which was considered offensive to Catholics, in the September 1933 issue of the magazine Reason. The trial judge found that the article's purpose was consistent with the purpose of the magazine, namely, "to combat all religious and social beliefs and customs that cannot stand the test of reason and to endeavor to create a scientific and tolerant mentality among the masses of the country". The trial judge Sir H. P. Dastur found that the article had no malicious intent and did not constitute a violation of section 295A.

On Sept 26, 1988, London based Penguin group published Satanic Verses. Sensing trouble, Penguin's Indian arm decided not to publish a local edition. Within 9 days of London publication, India banned Satanic Verses becoming the first country to do so. No petition challenging government order was filed.

In 1990, Understanding Islam through Hadis by Ram Swarup was banned. In 1990 the Hindi translation of the book was banned, and in March 1991 the English original became banned as well. Publisher Sita Ram Goel was arrested. Indian intellectuals protested against the arrest of Goel. Arun Shourie commented on the criminal case:

No one has ever refuted him on facts, but many have sought to smear him and his writing. They have thereby transmuted the work from mere scholarship into warning. (...)The forfeiture is exactly the sort of thing which had landed us where we are: where intellectual inquiry is shut out; where our traditions are not examined, and reassessed; and where as a consequence there is no dialogue. It is exactly the sort of thing too which foments reaction. (...)"Freedom of expression which is legitimate and constitutionally protected," it [the Supreme Court] declared last year, "cannot be held to ransom by an intolerant group or people."

In 1990, the Kerala government banned the play Jesus Christ Superstar. In 1991, Kerala High Court upheld the ban and observed that the script is against the fundamental belief of the Christian faith and the presentation of Jesus Christ in the play was “both sacrilegious and blasphemous". In April 2015, the Supreme Court of India quashed the ban and observed that the ban has outlived its utility. The drama has been staged abroad, including the Vatican, and is available online.

In 2005, the Supreme court set aside a decision of West Bengal government to forfeit all copies of the book "Dwikhandita" written by Taslima Narseen. The West Bengal government ordered forfeiture of all copies of "Dwikhandita" on the ground that it outraged the religious feelings of the Muslim community.

In 2006, seven states (Nagaland, Punjab, Goa, Tamil Nadu, Andhra Pradesh) banned the release or exhibition of the Hollywood movie The Da Vinci Code (and also the book), on the ground that it outraged the religious feeling of Christians. Roman Catholic Bishop Marampudi Joji, based in Andhra Pradesh's capital Hyderabad, welcomed the ban. Later, Two states lifted the ban under high court order.

In March 2007, a newspaper editor, BV Seetharam, was arrested under the Sections 153A, 153B, and 295 of the IPC for allegedly promoting religious hatred. He had written articles criticizing the public nudity of the Digambara Jain monks.

In September or October 2007, police in Pune arrested four Bangalore-based software-engineers for posting on the Internet an obscene profile of Chhatrapati Shivaji, a sixteenth-century Maratha warrior king.

In February 2009, the police arrested Ravindra Kumar and Anand Sinha, the editor and the publisher respectively of the Kolkata-based English daily The Statesman for hurting Muslim sentiments. The police charged Kumar and Sinha under section 295A because they had reprinted an article from The Independent by its columnist Johann Hari. Entitled "Why should I respect oppressive religions?", the article stated Hari's belief that the right to criticise any religion was being eroded around the world. Muslim protestors in Kolkata reacted to Hari's belief by violent demonstrations at the offices of The Statesman.

In November 2012, Maharashtra Police arrested Shaheen Dhada (21) for questioning the total shutdown in the city for Bal Thackeray’s funeral in a Facebook post, and also her friend Renu Srinivasan (20) for liking her post. Although no religious issue was involved, the two were charged under Section 295 (A) for hurting religious sentiments, apart from Section 66 (a) of the Information Technology Act 2000. However the charges under Section 295 (A) were later dropped and the girls were charged with Section 505 (2) of the Indian Penal Code, which pertains to statements which create or promote enmity, hatred or ill-will between classes.

Yogesh Master, a Bangalore-based writer was arrested on August 29 over his derogatory remarks on Ganesha, in his Kannada novel Dhundi, which was released on August 21. He was later released on bail. A complaint was lodged at the police station by various Hindu groups who blamed him for blasphemy and hurting religious sentiments. Yogesh, in his novel Dhundi: The story of a forester becoming Ganapathi wrote that Ganesha was born because of Parvati's illicit relationship. This had outraged the public at large.

In a 2012, following an investigation into an alleged miracle conducted with the consent of the church authorities, rationalist Sanal Edamaruku made several disparaging remarks against Christians. This led to several First information reports under Section 295(A) and Edamaruku moving to Finland.

In September 2014, Gujarat Police arrested Sunil Jagdishsinh Rajput whose Facebook post provoked Muslims to riot. He was booked under IPC 153(C) and 295(C) and bail was denied.

In September 2014, Gujarat Police arrested Muslim cleric Mehadi Hasan for calling Navratri a 'festival of demons'.

In March 2015, Karnataka Police arrested Sriram Yadapadithaya on the basis of a complaint filed by Fr William Menezes of Mangaluru Catholic Diocese. The complaint alleged that Sriram's Facebook comments questioned the basic tenets of Christianity. Flavy D'Souza, president of the Catholic Sabha, had urged authorities to take strict action against people who indulge in such acts. The Catholic Sabha had warned that it would resort to agitation if the authorities failed to do so.

In Dec 2015, Azam Khan, Senior Minister of Uttar Pradesh government, stated that RSS workers are homosexual. In response, Kamlesh Tiwari made an objectionable statement against the Prophet Mohammed. Kamlesh Tiwari was arrested and bail was denied. In West Bengal, A Muslim rally against Kamlesh Tiwari led to Kaliachak riots.

On 20 September 2016, a blogger named Tarak Biswas was arrested for criticising Islam under Section 295A and 298, besides 66, 67 and 67A of the IT Act after a complaint about hurting religious sentiments was lodged by Sanaullah Khan, a Trinamool Congress leader.

On 25 February 2018, two people were arrested for allegedly making derogatory remarks against Prime Minister Narendra Modi, UP chief minister Yogi Adityanath, and Hindu gods. Four people were booked under section 295-A.

=== Citizens filed complaints but arrest warrant not issued ===
On May 27, 1953, 5:30 pm IST, Periyar E. V. Ramasamy, father of Dravidian Movement, broke the image of God Ganesh in a public meeting at Town Hall. A police complaint was filed and police report verified that the alleged occurrence was true. Local trial magistrate dismissed the complaint holding that the breaking of a mud image of Ganesh is not an offense. Sessions court and high court, agreed with the view trial magistrate. Session court judge stated that Idol breaking by a non-believer cannot be regarded, by a believer, as an insult to his religion. High Court judge also refused to certify that this was a fit case for appeal to Supreme Court under Art. 134(1)(c) of the Constitution. On August 25, 1958, A petitioner, S. Veerabadran Chettiar, filed a special leave petition in Supreme Court. The petitioner stated that before breaking the idol, accused gave a speech, and expressly stated that he intended to insult the feelings of the Hindu community by breaking the idol of God. Supreme court disagreed with lower court judgement and criticized lower court for being cynical but concluded that 5 year has passed and case is stale; Therefore, Dismissed the appeal.

On 2 August 2006, two religious groups in Ahmedabad complained to the police that their religious sentiments were hurt because a garment-maker had printed text from the Hindu and Jain religions on clothing. The police filed the complaint as a matter under section 295.

In December 2006, a complaint was filed against cricketer Ravi Shastri for hurting the religious feelings of Hindus by allegedly eating beef during a Test match in Johannesburg, South Africa.

In the 1990s, many cases were filed against M F Husain for hurting religious sentiments by painting Bharat Mata as a naked woman. In May 2007, a Buddhist group in Maharashtra's Amravati district said their religious sentiments were hurt, and filed a complaint against Rakhi Sawant, an actress, because she posed in a bathtub against a statue of Buddha.

In 2011, a lawsuit was filed by Dinanath Batra under Section 295A against the book The Hindus: An Alternative History. The book was withdrawn from the Indian market by its Indian publisher, and the publisher Penguin India agreed to destroy all the existing copies within six months commencing from February 2014.

In October 2015, Catholic Church in India demanded ban on the play 'Agnes of God', an adaptation of American playwright John Pielmeier's drama. CBCI, the body of Catholic bishops in India, stated it was "misrepresentation of the religious belief of the Christian community". Play's director seek police protection for himself and the lead cast including thespian actor Mahabanoo Mody-Kotwal.

== Contradicting views of the Supreme Court ==
=== Initial view ===
The Supreme Court Monday 8 April 2013 issued notice to the central government on a petition seeking framing of guidelines to curb elected representatives from delivering hate speeches in pursuance of their political goals.

An apex court bench headed by the then Chief Justice Altamas Kabir issued the notice after senior counsel Basva Patil told the court that such leaders deliver hate speeches repeatedly, inflaming regional, religious and ethnic passion. He also added that, if arrested after making the hate speech, they repeat their actions upon being released on bail. He urged that the rule of law should be strengthened and such leaders not be permitted to repeatedly make hate speeches.

The notice was also issued to the Election Commission of India, and the Maharashtra and Andhra Pradesh governments. The public interest litigation (PIL) was filed by the voluntary organisation Pravasi Bhalai Sangathan.

=== More recent view ===
The Supreme Court on Monday 3 March 2014, dismissed a PIL by Advocate M L Sharma seeking intervention by the court in directing the Election Commission to curb hate speeches. Dismissing the plea, the Apex court said that it could not curb the fundamental right of the people to express themselves.

"We cannot curtail fundamental rights of people. It is a precious rights guaranteed by Constitution," a bench headed by Justice RM Lodha said, adding "we are a mature democracy and it is for the public to decide. We are 1280 million people and there would be 1280 million views. One is free not to accept the view of others". Also the court said that it is a matter of perception, and a statement objectionable to a person might not be normal to other person.

On 21 October 2022, the Supreme Court directed the Central government as well as the State governments of India to take strong action against people who make hate speeches particularly against Muslims. The top court also warned that if the government fails to take action, contempt proceedings will be initiated against the authorities.

== Misuse ==
The laws are under scrutiny due to widespread misuse by governments to suppress dissent and press freedom. There has been a six fold increase in 153 A cases between 2014 & 2020 with a very high police pendency rate and only 1 in 5 cases end in conviction.

== See also ==
- Freedom of religion in India
