= Parsi–Muslim riots =

Riots which occurred in 1851 in Bombay

Parsi–Muslim Riots of 1851, 1857 , 1874 and 1885
- Part of Religious violence in India
- Date: 17 October 1851, 10 May 1857, 13 February 1874 and 26 November 1885
- Location: Bombay (now Mumbai, Maharashtra); 19.0760°N 72.8777°E
- Caused by: Publication of Muhammad (a Muslim taboo) by the Parsee press, on both occasions.

Casualties
- Injuries: 7 Muslims and 4 Parsees
- Location of the riots

The Parsi–Muslim riots occurred in 1851 in Bombay, and were reprised in 1874 in parts of Gujarat. These marked the beginning of a period of tension in the two communities. The first riot took place over the blurred depiction of the Islamic prophet, Muhammad, and his appearance in a public print by a Parsi newspaper, Chitra Gyan Darpan, in October 1851. A second riot place in May 1857, over a Parsi named Bejonji Sheriaiji Bharucha was accused of disrespecting a mosque by some Muslims. A third riot took place on 13 February 1874, over an article on the life of Muhammad in a book entitled Famous Prophets and Communities.

== History ==
=== 1851 ===
The first Parsi–Muslim riot began on 17 October 1851 and lasted for a month, after a copy of a Gujarati article depicted Muhammad. The article, published by Parsi newspaper Chitra Gyan Darpan, was posted on the wall of the Jama Masjid in Bombay. People leaving the mosque after Namaz (around 11 a.m.) saw it and were enraged, as Islam forbids the pictorial depiction of Muhammad. Due to the printer, an image of Muhammad was published with a blemish over one of his eyes, making him look blinded in that eye.

Parsis were attacked by the mob on the streets and in their homes. Shops were looted, Zoroastrian fire temples were ransacked and jewellery was stolen. The kotwal tried stopping the riots but failed to do so. The police were unable to stop the violence. A curfew was declared and the army was posted in various parts of the city.

One month later, a meeting was held on 24 November 1851 between members of both communities where Cursetji clarified that it was not the intention to hurt Muslim feelings by depicting their prophet. He explained that it was just a piece of information about Muhammad, like all other remarkable personalities that the newspaper was used to publishing. He mentioned that the controversial work was copied from Simon Ockley. To demonstrate goodwill and friendship and to show that the two communities can peacefully coexist, Sir Jamsetjee Jeejeebhoy and the Kazi of Bombay rode together, sharing the same carriage through Muslim and Parsi neighbourhoods.

=== 1874 ===
On 15 June 1873, Rustomjee Hormusjee Jalbhoy published a book in Gujarati that contained biographies of eminent personalities, including Muhammad. The tension was already building up when an article from The Memorial quoted:

"a mob of Seedees and Arabs armed with sticks and stones invaded Abdool Rehman Street"

— The Memorial, Friday, February 13, 1874

Sir Frank Henry Souter, the Commissioner of Police at that time, knew about the tensions, but failed to escalate police presence. The mob, practically unopposed, started attacking Parsis in their homes and on the streets. The next day, riots again erupted at Khetwadi. The following day, some Parsis began throwing stones at a Muslim funeral procession heading towards a cemetery. Four Parsis and seven Muslims were admitted to Jamsetjee Hospital, where several other injured were also treated.

Narayan Wassoodew and Dr. Blaney took the initiative to launch a Parsi and Muslim community "Reconciliation Movement". The Parsis demanded "sincere regret at the conduct of the lower classes of their co-religionists" from the Muslims, but the movement failed. This was due to the fact that the Muslims had failed to submit to the Parsi leaders an authenticated copy of the resolution, despite the Parsis' insistence on it.

=== 1885 ===
There was another riot between Parsis and Muslims on 26 November 1885 when land to build a Dargah was not granted by the authorities. As there were Parsi members in the Municipal Council, they were accused of not granting it.

== See also ==
- 1857 Bharuch riot
- Bombay Dog Riots
- List of riots in India
- Zoroastrianism in India
- Persecution of Zoroastrians by Muslims
