= List of riots in Mumbai =

The city of Mumbai (formerly Bombay) has had several riots in its history. This is a list of riots.

== Riots ==
Riots in Mumbai
Name	Year	Locations	Cause	Factions	Deaths	Wounded	Damage	Ref
Bombay Dog Riots	1832 (6 to 7 June)	South Mumbai	Protest by Parsis against the British government's killing of stray dogs	Parsis	None	None	N/A	
Parsi–Muslim riots, 1851	October 1851		Protests by Muslims against the Chitra Dynan Darpan owned by a Parsee. The publication had printed a depiction of Muhammad and his history.	Parsis; Muslims	N/A	N/A	N/A	
Parsi–Muslim riots, 1874	13 February 1874		Publishing of details of Muhammad in Famous Prophets and Communities by Rustomji Hormusji Jalbhoy	Parsis; Muslims	N/A	N/A	N/A	
Bombay Riots of 1930	1930	various	Protests against the Salt tax	Indian; British government	N/A	N/A	N/A	
1992 Bombay riots	December 1992, January 1993	Various	Protests over the demolition of the Babri Masjid	Hindus; Muslims	~900			

== See also ==
- List of massacres in India
