= Vishnu Shankar Jain =

Indian politician and lawyer (born 1986)

- Born: 9 October 1986 (age 39); Prayagraj, Uttar Pradesh
- Occupation: lawyer

Vishnu Shankar Jain is an Indian lawyer known as a petitioner in various controversial claims including the demands of surveys on various Mosques in India.

== Early life ==
Jain was born on 9 October 1986, he completed his law studies at Balaji Law College in 2010.

== Career ==
=== Gyanvapi Mosque ===
In 2022, Jain and his father were among the lawyers representing the petitioners who demanded the survey of the Gyanvapi Mosque at a local Court in Varanasi.

The petitioners later announced that Jain and their team would no longer represent them.

=== Shahi Eidgah Mosque ===
In 2023, he was a part of the group of lawyers who represented a petition to the Allahabad High Court seeking a survey of the Shahi Eidgah mosque (Mathura).

The High Court initially permitted a survey, but The Supreme Court later stayed the survey, observing the plea was vague.

=== Shahi Jama Masjid ===
In 2024, he along with his father, represented a group of Hindu plaintiffs in the civil Court of Sambhal, demanding a survey of Shahi Jama Masjid in Sambhal, Uttar Pradesh.

The prayer was granted ex parte and the survey was completed by the evening. Commentators and scholars note the litigation to be part of a broader Hindu nationalist assault on Indian Muslims.

After a few days, again, there was an attempt at a fresh survey which gave rise to apprehensions that the surveyors were excavating the mosque; stone-pelting and arson followed, resulting in four deaths, likely from retaliatory police firing.

A week later, the Supreme Court of India directed the Civil Court to pause all proceedings until the Allahabad High Courtheard the Mosque Committee's challenge to the survey order.

=== Waqf Act ===
In 2025, Jain also represented petitioners, in the Supreme Court of India challenging the Waqf Act (1995).

=== VIP Darshan ===
In 2026, Jain was the counsel for the petitioner, Darpan Awasthi in the Supreme Court of India challenging the practice of VIP darshan at the Mahakaleshwar Temple in Ujjain.The petition was refused to be entertained by Justice Surya Kant.

=== Qutub Minar ===
Jain has represented petitions claiming the Quwwat-ul-Islam Mosque within the Qutub Minar complex in Delhi was built upon the ruins of 27 demolished Hindu and Jain temples, and seeking the restoration of deity worship.

=== UGC 2026 ===
In 2026, Jain also represented petitioners, in the Supreme Court of India challenging the UGC Regulations 2026.

=== Bhojshala Case ===
Jain is the lead lawyer for the Hindu side in the legal battle for the Bhojshala in Dhar, Madhya Pradesh.
