= Mubarak Manzil (Agra) =

- Location: Belanganj, Agra, Uttar Pradesh

History
- Built: 17th century
- Built for: Emperor Aurangzeb

Site notes
- Area: 20,000 square feet
- Architectural style: Mughal architecture

Mubarak Manzil (also known as Aurangzeb's Haveli) was a 17th-century Mughal heritage building located in Agra, Uttar Pradesh, India. Built by Emperor Aurangzeb following his victory at the Battle of Samugarh, it served as a residence for several prominent Mughal figures before being repurposed during the British Raj. The structure, which occupied 20,000 square feet of historic land near Ghat Road in the Belanganj area, was largely demolished in early 2025, despite being listed for protection by the state archaeological department.

== History ==
Mubarak Manzil was part of Agra's rich Mughal heritage, which once included 197 Mughal-era structures, 17 gardens, and 28 havelis adorning the Yamuna riverfront.

=== Mughal Period ===
The Mubarak Manzil was constructed in the 17th century under the direction of Emperor Aurangzeb during his reign (1618-1707). Historical records, including Archibald Campbell Carlyle's 1871 report and a marble plaque at the site, indicate it was built at the location where Aurangzeb rested after his decisive victory over his brother Dara Shikoh in the Battle of Samugarh near Fatehabad. According to historian Rajkishore Raje, the building was originally Dara Shikoh's palace, which Aurangzeb renamed after his victory. The building served as a residence for notable Mughal figures including Shah Jahan, Shah Shuja, and Aurangzeb himself.

The history of Mubarak Manzil reflects broader patterns in Mughal architecture and property rights, as discussed by historian Ebba Koch. Mughal nobles often held temporary ownership of grand residences, like havelis, under the emperor's authority. These structures were often repurposed or reassigned, which aligns with the documented changes in the building's ownership. Koch identifies a similar example in the haveli of ‘Alamgir (Aurangzeb) in Agra, which went through multiple hands before becoming part of the imperial holdings. This fluidity in ownership was a distinctive feature of Mughal administrative and architectural culture.

=== British Period ===
During the British colonial period, the building underwent significant modifications and served various administrative functions. An 1868 map of Agra placed the structure near the pontoon bridge, where the current iron bridge stands. The East India Railway used it as a goods depot during British rule. It was subsequently converted into:

- A customs house
- A salt office
- Tara Niwas (by 1902)

The building's treatment during this period reflected broader colonial attitudes toward Indian architectural heritage. While some British officials advocated for preservation of such structures, many historic buildings were repurposed for administrative use with little regard for their historical or cultural significance.

In 1904, members of Agra's Muslim community petitioned the British government for the restitution of Mubarak Manzil, reflecting growing local resistance to colonial appropriation of historic Islamic architecture. This appeal was one of several similar requests made by Indian communities seeking to reclaim control of their architectural heritage during this period.

The Jaisingh map of 1720s created for Sawai Jai Singh of Jaipur shows the location of the Aurangzeb (or Alamgir) haveli, marked with two courtyards. A railway line built by the British between 1893 and 1911 bisected the property, likely along the demarcation of the courtyards.

== Architecture ==
The Mubarak Manzil was a rectangular, oblong-shaped building measuring 171 feet in length and 84 feet in breadth, excluding its corner towers. Key architectural features included:

- Four octagonal corner towers, crowned by pillared cupolas
- Three-story structure with intricate detailing
- Eastern colonnade with fluted pillars and engraved arches
- West wall featuring 15 openings
- South side with three doorways
- Second storey featuring a covered verandah with plain outward-facing arches
- Interior compartment believed to have served as a mosque
- Red sandstone base
- Construction materials including lakhauri bricks, surkhi, and lime

Ebba Koch highlights the architectural nuances of Mughal-era havelis: they often integrated practical and ceremonial spaces, including mosques or audience halls. Although named a masjid (mosque), the "Masjid Mubarak Manzil" was more akin to an audience hall, reminiscent of the Divan-i-Am in the Agra Fort. The architectural elements of Mubarak Manzil, such as its corner towers and engraved arches, exemplify the blending of functionality and ornamentation that characterized Mughal design.

== Demolition ==
In September 2024, the Archaeological Survey of India (ASI) issued a notification proposing protection status for Mubarak Manzil. Despite no objections being raised during the review period and a recent visit by officials to initiate preservation efforts, the structure was largely demolished in January 2025. Over 100 tractors of debris were removed from the site during the demolition drive. Local residents alleged collusion between a builder and officials, claiming that approximately 70% of the structure was destroyed despite the presence of a nearby police outpost.

The demolition sparked political controversy in Uttar Pradesh. Samajwadi Party chief Akhilesh Yadav criticized the "bulldozer action" on the heritage structure. Following the political uproar, Agra's district magistrate ordered authorities to maintain status quo at the site and initiated a detailed investigation, particularly focusing on land records. A team led by Sub-Divisional Magistrate Sachin Rajput, along with officials from ASI and the state archaeology department, conducted an on-site inspection.
