= 1991 anti-Tamil violence in Karnataka =

Mob violence in Karnataka

The 1991 anti-Tamil violence in Karnataka refers to incidents of mob violence targeting Tamils in state of Karnataka in India. The incidents took place in Southern Karnataka on 12–13 December 1991, mainly in the cities of Bangalore and Mysore. The attacks originated in the demonstrations organised against the orders of the Cauvery Water Tribunal appointed by the Government of India. The violence terrified the Tamil populace of Southern Karnataka forcing over a thousand Tamils to flee in a matter of weeks. The official statistics given by the Government of Karnataka was that sixteen people had been killed in the police firing during protest but individual sources give higher numbers.

== Background ==
As of 2001, Tamil-speakers formed 3.82% of the total population of Karnataka. Tamil-speaking people are found in the districts of Bengaluru Urban, Bangalore Rural, Ramanagara, Mysore, Kolar, Hassan, few in Mandya and Chamarajanagar in southern Karnataka, and few in Shimoga in central Karnataka.

While the Bangalore Cantonment area administered directly by the Government of British India prior to its integration with the then Mysore state, had a sizable Tamil-speaking populations. The migrants occupied extremely diverse positions in the socioeconomic strata and represented every class, caste and community in Tamil Nadu. Gradually, this demographic and bureaucratic domination began to be resented by Kannada people who felt that the immigrant Tamils were snatching away their rightful jobs.

== Events ==
On 25 June 1991, the Kaveri Water Tribunal, constituted in 1990, directed the Karnataka state government to release 5.8 km^{3} of water to Tamil Nadu within a year. Karnataka issued an ordinance to annul the tribunal's award but this was struck down by the Supreme Court of India. The tribunal's award was subsequently gazetted by the Government of India on 11 December 1991.

The very next day, pro-Kannada organisations led by Vatal Nagaraj called for a bandh on 13 December alleging partisan behaviour of the Government of India. He declared that,

"Cauvery is the mother of the Kannadigas, so we cannot give the water to anybody else".

The next day, marauding mobs roamed the streets of Bengaluru. Tamil businesses, movie theatres and even vehicles with Tamil Nadu license plates were targeted, soon the riots spread to the Mysuru district and other parts of southern Karnataka and Tamil Nadu. Entire slums of migrants were torched, Over a thousand Tamils fled from Karnataka, A curfew of one week was declared under section 144. The violence left more than sixteen people dead in Bengaluru city.

The Indian Human Rights Tribunal puts the total property losses suffered in Tamil Nadu and Karnataka at ₹ 17 crores while the Venkatesh Commission has given estimates varying from ₹ 3 crores to ₹ 15 crores.

== Aftermath ==
The situation was soon brought under control and though, there were incidents of violence reported till the end of 1991, the situation had calmed down.

There have been similar incidents of violence in 1996, 2000, 2004 and 2016.

== See also ==
- List of riots in India
