= 2020 Bangalore riots =

2020 religiously motivated riots in Bangalore, India

- (top) Vehicles were set on fire during the rioting. (bottom) Firefighter extinguishing the fire.
- Date: August 11–12, 2020
- Location: Bangalore, Karnataka, India: Kaval Byrasandra; Devara Jeevanahalli Police Station; Kadugondanahalli Police Station
- Caused by: alleged blasphemous Facebook post on Muhammad
- Methods: arson; stone pelting and assault on police

Casualties
- Deaths: 3 in police firing
- Injuries: 30–80 policemen
- Arrested: 206 (including detained)
- Damage: Residence of accused, cars, police station burnt .

On the night of 11 August and the early hours of 12 August 2020, violent clashes took place around the residence of a legislator and the police stations of KG Halli and DJ Halli of the Indian city of Bangalore, Karnataka. A group of Muslims, angered by a Facebook post on Muhammad allegedly shared by Akhanda Srinivas Murthy's nephew, a state legislator of the Indian National Congress, arrived at his house in protest, which later turned violent.

The clashes between the police and the mobs happened around the residence of the legislator and the police stations of KG Halli and DJ Halli. The incident resulted in the imposition of a curfew in the affected areas. 3 people were killed after police opened fire on the crowds. 30–80 policemen and several journalists, were injured by armed assailants. Murthy's property was torched during the period of violence.

The following day, over 100 people were arrested by the police. Some of the crowds were also allegedly led by members of the Social Democratic Party of India (SDPI), and has led to the arrest of a few of its leaders.

== Incident ==
On 11 August 2020, the nephew of an Indian National Congress state legislator Akhanda Srinivas Murthee (Note: elected as the representative of Pulakeshinagar (SC) constituency) allegedly posted a derogatory remark on Facebook that targeted the Islamic prophet Muhammad. The post went viral in the area and people began gathering in front of the legislator's residence in Kaval Byrasandra in protest, demanding that the accused be arrested. The police sent two teams from the DJ Halli station to detain the nephew.

According to the police, at around 8 p.m., small groups had arrived at Kaval Byrasandra, following which hundreds started gathering around the DJ Halli police station, demanding action against those responsible for the social media message. Members of the SDPI were reportedly present in the crowd at DJ Halli. The people present there tried to report a complaint but claimed that the police were not acting swiftly, which agitated the crowd.

The News Minute reported there were 17–20 Muslims protesting in front of the legislator's residence at 8:30 p.m., however within the next hour the numbers swelled to around 200, joined by people armed with sticks, petrol and kerosene cans. This crowd began throwing stones, vandalising the residence and eventually set a part of the property on fire. The legislator and his family were not present inside the residence at the time of the attack. The mob reportedly also indulged in looting at the residence; according to Murthy, ornaments and sarees went missing from his house.

Meanwhile, the police at DJ Halli station attempted to defuse the tension with the assistance of local community members but when one of the teams returned without the accused, the crowd forcefully entered the station, vandalised it and even set police vehicles on fire. At 10:30 p.m., two other Congress state legislators Zameer Ahmed Khan and Rizwan Arshad arrived at the DJ Halli station to help subdue the situation but the violence had reportedly gotten out of control by this time. The Bengaluru Police Commissioner, Kamal Pant also arrived around the same time. Between 11:00 p.m and 12:30 a.m, a group of Muslim youths also formed a human chain around the local temple near DJ Halli station to protect it in case of any escalation. According to a later testimony from the police, that fortunately "the riots did not snowball into a communal riot". Eventually the Karnataka State Reserve Police (KSRP) had to be called in to disperse the crowd and free the policemen trapped inside the station. The KSRP began by lathi charges, proceeded to firing tear gas, then firing warning shots and eventually fired live rounds at the crowd.

In Kaval Byrasandra, by 10:30 p.m the mob at Murthy's house had moved to his nephew's residence, demanding that he be handed over to them and on receiving no response barged in, vandalised and looted the house. The resident family took refuge in a neighbor's house by climbing through parapets. The family's car was burned down as well. The mob eventually moved around the neighborhood setting fire to several cars and a bar. Around 11 p.m., rumours started spreading that a neighbouring police station, KG Halli, was protecting the legislator's nephew. During the confrontation with the police in DJ Halli, a section of the mob dispersed and a new mob was formed at KG Halli that attempted to enter the station. However, this mob was met with stronger resistance from the police and in the end resorted to burning down cars parked outside. Several policemen and journalists outside the station were injured by the armed mob. The crowds eventually scattered after the police at DJ Halli station began firing.

According to The Hindu, the total number of participants in the mobs amounted to 2000 while the police firing at DJ Halli resulted in the death of 3 people. The deaths were later confirmed by the city police commissioner, according to whom at least 1000 people were involved. Between 1 a.m. and 5 a.m., the police began clearing the streets while identifying and arresting those involved in the violence.

== Aftermath ==
=== Investigation ===
On 12 August 2020, the JCP (Crime) Bengaluru, Sandeep Patil reported that 110 people had been arrested in relation with the violence. The accused were charged under attempt to murder and obstruction of a public servant. The Bengaluru Police Commissioner, Kamal Pant, stated that a curfew was enforced in the DJ Halli and KG Halli police jurisdictions while section 144 imposed in the rest of the city. Later in the same day, Pant extended the curfew till 6 a.m. of 15 August. The Central Crime Branch DCP, Kuldeep Jain justified the police firing and stated that due process was followed. According to his testimony, the police attempted to convince the mob but they had instead turned violent and begun throwing stones at the police due to which additional forces had to be brought in. The Home Minister Basavaraj Bommai also stated that the police had to resort to firing to bring the situation under control.

The families of those killed in the firing claimed they were simply bystanders and did not take part in the violence, as did the family members of many arrested. The legislator's nephew, who made the objectionable post, was also arrested. However, he claimed that his Facebook account was hacked, while his father claimed his phone had been stolen two days before the post. His uncle, the legislator, filed an FIR for the destruction of his ancestral house, claiming 3 crores loss, and sought police protection for himself and his family.

On 14 August 2020, the Bengaluru Police Commissioner reported that 60 more people were arrested in night operations on 14 August, bringing the total arrested to 206. One of them, the husband of a BBMP corporator, was the 7th accused in the First Information Report filed, according to which, he was one of the "conspirators." 80 of the arrested were shifted to a jail in Ballari.

Several politicians were charged in the riots including former mayor R. Sampath Raj and one of his corporators were taken into custody on 17 November and 3 December respectively. Raj absconded for 6 weeks after escaping a hospital where he was undergoing treatment for COVID-19. Police claim Raj inflamed the riots in order to weaken Murthy, who he saw as his political rival, and filed charges against him relating to arson at Murthy's residence.

==== Trial ====
In February 2022, the supreme court rejected the bail applications of five accused; Shaikh Muhammed Bilal, Syed Asif, Mohammed Atif, Naqeeb Pasha And Syed Ikramuddin.

=== Response ===
Akhanda Srinivas Murthy claimed he had a "brotherly" relationship with everyone, and that he did not know why anyone wanted to burn down his house. He also called for action against the sharer of the offending post.

B. S. Yediyurappa, Chief Minister of Karnataka, ordered strict action against rioters involved. Congress leader and former Chief Minister of the state Siddaramaiah called for calm and condemned both the riots and the post that incited them, and called for the arrest of those who instigated them. Congress also summoned a legislator meeting over the violence. Leaders in the SDPI denied involvement in the violence and claimed it only occurred due to "police inaction against blasphemy and failure of intelligence," and criticized the police for "unecessarily dragging" their leaders into the incident.

The riots quickly became politicized, with politicians from the BJP accusing Congress of having links with the riots. BJP National Secretary B. L. Santhosh criticized the Congress for allegedly supporting the "right to riot" and engaging in "appeasement" (towards Muslims). Since the legislator is Dalit, many BJP leaders also accused Congress of being "anti-Dalit." Congress leader Priyank M. Kharge alleged the statements of Santosh were attempts to communalise the incident. Congress also criticized the Karnataka government for failing to prevent the incident, with spokesman Randeep Surjewala claiming they represented "complete failure of law and order machinery."

R. Ashoka, Revenue Minister of Karnataka, claimed the mob had "plans to move to Shivajinagar" afterwards and they had "everything they needed to create violence ready." Karnataka tourism minister C. T. Ravi and Bengaluru South MP Tejasvi Surya demanded compensation for damaged property be forcibly provided by known participants in the riots, a policy proposed by Yogi Adityanath-led Uttar Pradesh following anti-CAA protests there. Several opposition leaders, including Janata Dal (Secular) leader H. D. Kumaraswamy and Karnataka Congress president D. K. Shivakumar also claimed the riots were a "planned conspiracy."

== See also ==
- List of riots in India
- Bangalore disturbances
- Religious violence in India
- Islam and blasphemy
