= Devara Jeevanahalli =

Neighborhood in Banglore Urban, Karnataka, India 560045

Devara Jeevanahalli Devarajeevanahalli, DJ Halli
- Neighborhood
- Devara Jeevanahalli
- Nickname: DJ Halli
- Location within Bengaluru
- Coordinates: 13.01°N 77.60°E
- Country: India
- State: Karnataka
- District: Banglore Urban

Government
  - Body: BBMP

Languages
  - Official: Kannada
- Time zone: UTC+5:30 (IST)
- PIN: 560045
- Vehicle registration: KA-04

Devara Jeevanahalli (or spelled as Devarajeevanahalli and popularly known as DJ Halli) is a locality in North Bengaluru, India, adjoining Bangalore Cantonment and R. T. Nagar. The locality is part of Pulakeshinagar Assembly constituency and Bangalore North Lok Sabha constituency. It is one of the largest slums in Bangalore.

Often referred to as a sensitive area having seen its share of communal tension, the locality saw violence in Bangalore when a police station and other public property were damaged during the riots in 2020. The first police station in the area was inaugurated in 2016. In 2016, over 350 school children at the Government Urdu Higher Primary School from Devara Jeevanahalli complained of food poisoning and were hospitalized after having mid-day meals.
