= 1941 Dhaka riots =

1941 Hindu-Muslim communal violence in Bengal

The 1941 Dhaka riots (also known as the Dacca riot of 1941) was a major incident of Hindu-Muslim communal violence that began on 14 March 1941 in Dhaka (then Dacca), Bengal. The violence engulfed both the city of Dhaka and the surrounding countryside, marking a significant escalation in the communal tensions of the 1940s. Characterised by historians as a "transition to a new phase", the riot introduced a new scale and quality of violence that acted as a harbinger for the massive communal tragedies of 1946, such as the Direct Action Day and the Noakhali riots.

== Background ==
By the early 20th century, the demographics and socio-economic divisions of East Bengal set the stage for communal conflict. In Dhaka and most districts of the eastern region of Bengal Presidency, there was a substantial Muslim majority. The 1872 census found that Muslims constituted 56.5 percent of the population, with a population growth rate between 1872 and 1901 nearly double that of Hindus. Muslims were predominantly concentrated in rural areas, especially in the northern thanas (police stations) of Raipura and Kapasia. In contrast, Hindus outnumbered Muslims in Dhaka city itself, while the Narayanganj subdivision had the lowest proportion of Hindus. The Namasudras were the dominant Hindu caste in the district, mainly concentrated in the Srinagar, Nawabganj, and Keraniganj thanas.

The socio-economic disparity between the two communities was stark. Hindus formed the bulk of the upper and middle classes, largely monopolising wealth, education, trade, and moneylending. The ratio of moneylenders in Dhaka was the highest in Bengal, estimated at 280 per lakh (100,000) of persons, compared to 40 in Burdwan. While some Muslims worked as petty shopkeepers, they lacked the capital to compete in the wholesale trade, leaving the "cream of commerce" in Hindu hands. Due to the Islamic prohibition against charging interest, Muslims were rarely engaged in moneylending. Consequently, Hindus became wealthier and built "palatial residences" in prime urban locations, whereas Muslim residential areas increasingly turned into overpopulated, unsanitary slums. Furthermore, the Muslim population of Dhaka had been strongly influenced by the Wahabi and Faraizi movements, which emphasized the rejection of syncretic rites.

Dhaka had previously experienced communal disturbances in 1926 and 1930. The 1926 Janmashtami riot, for example, was a predominantly urban disturbance marked by sporadic clashes, but it featured notable self-restraint. In those earlier riots, arson was limited, there were no mass conversions or rapes, and in one instance, an armed Muslim gang even spared a Hindu house occupied solely by four young girls. The 1941 riot, however, marked a stark departure from this pattern, as the previously observed self-restraint was remarkably absent.

== Events ==
=== Initial clash in the city ===
The riot was triggered on 14 March 1941 by a relatively minor incident. Conch-shell workers in the Shankhari Bazaar area were celebrating the Hindu festival of Holi. During the celebrations, coloured water accidentally fell on a burqa-clad Muslim woman. This led to a minor clash, which the police initially brought under control.

Violence escalated dramatically a few days later. On 18 March, a Muslim man was stabbed to death in Kabiraj Lane, and a Muslim boy was killed when a Hindu mob attacked Manohar Khan Bazar. That evening, a Muslim hawker was found murdered in Gandaria. In retaliation, Muslim mobs attacked and set fire to Hindu-owned shops at Chawk Bazar and Maulvi Bazar.

On 19 March, major clashes between Hindus and Muslims occurred in the Victoria Park area, resulting in the burning of the Muslim Provincial Library and the Hindu Associated Press. By 21 March, the violence intensified further. A sub-divisional officer was stabbed near the Lion Cinema Hall. Religious sites became primary targets, with mosques at Thatari Bazar and Rankin Street, and a Hindu temple at South Maisundi, being attacked and desecrated. In Dhaka city, Hindu rioters were identified as the chief aggressors.

=== Spread to rural areas ===
Fuelled by rumours that Muslims were being oppressed and their mosques desecrated in Dhaka city, the violence rapidly spilled over into the adjoining rural areas. Unlike in the city, Muslim rioters were the primary aggressors in the countryside, wreaking havoc on rural Hindu communities.

Significant communal tension developed in the port town of Narayanganj. While Keraniganj and Munshiganj experienced minor incidents, the violence was most severe in the rural thanas of Raipur, Shibpur, and Narsingdi. In Munshiganj, peasant mobilisation took on both an economic and communal character. In March, a group of about fifty peasants attacked a hat (market) at Tangibari, looting clothes and food items. This initial looting soon evolved into a more organised form of protest, characterised by the refusal of peasants to pay rent and repay agricultural loans to the predominantly Hindu landlords and moneylenders.

The breakdown of law and order continued into April. On 3 April 1941, a police official named Hatch Barwell was severely beaten by a mob at Rahimabad, and his revolver was snatched away.

== Impact ==
The 1941 Dhaka riot resulted in widespread devastation. According to official police reports, 2,519 households across 81 villages were attacked and looted, affecting a total of 15,724 people. The demographics of the victims mirrored the population distribution and the geographical spread of the violence: the victims were predominantly Muslims within the urban centre of Dhaka city, and predominantly Hindus in the surrounding rural areas.

Historically, the riot is viewed as a turning point in Bengal's history. It ushered in a new, more organised, and ruthless form of communal violence that bypassed the self-restraint seen in previous decades, contributing significantly to the hardening of communal identities that would culminate in the Partition of India just a few years later.
