= Cursetjee =

Cursetjee is a surname. Notable people with the surname include:

- Ardaseer Cursetjee (1808–1877), Indian shipbuilder
- Manockjee Cursetjee (1808–1887), Parsi businessman and judge
