= 1967 Ranchi-Hatia riots =

Communal riots in India

- Part of Religious violence in India
- Date: August 1967
- Location: Ranchi
- Caused by: Anti-Urdu agitation
- Goals: Communal violence

Casualties
- Deaths: Official: 184: 164 Muslims; 19 Hindus; 1 unverified
- Injuries: Official: 156: 103 Muslims; 53 Hindus

The Ranchi-Hatia riots of 1967 were communal riots which occurred in 1967 in and around Ranchi in present-day Jharkhand, India. The riots happened between 22 and 29 August 1967. 184 people were reported killed and 195 shops were looted and set on fire.

== Background ==
Troubles erupted between Hindus and Muslims in the towns of Hatia and Ranchi in Bihar. Rioting had already occurred in the district in 1964, following anti-Hindu violence in East Pakistan. The Raghubar Dayal Commission of Inquiry established that communal tensions (regarding the organization of the Hindu Ram Navami festival) had been rising since April 1964. During the March 1967 general elections, the situation further degenerated because of the debate over the Urdu issue. A proposal to declare Urdu the second official language of Bihar weakened the ruling coalition and led to state-wide, anti-Urdu agitation on the part of the Bharatiya Jana Sangh, the Rashtriya Swayamsevak Sangh, and an organization called the Bihar Hindi Sahitiya Sammelan.

== Initial clashes ==
Trouble erupted in Ranchi on August 22 after the brick-batting of an anti-Urdu student procession near Muslim Azad High School. The school was attacked and one Hindu was killed in retaliation. The Raghubar Dayal Commission of Inquiry reported 184 deaths in Ranchi - among them 164 Muslims and 19 Hindus. Violence spread, leading to arson, looting, stabbings, and large-scale rioting in the city itself as well as in nearby industrial towns, particularly Hatia, where 26 people died (25 Muslims and 1 Hindu).
