= Anti-mosque campaigning in India =

Anti-mosque campaigning in India refers to a series of assertions predominantly advanced by right-wing and far-right Hindu organisations, alleging that numerous present-day mosque sites were originally the locations of Hindu temples. These claims are widely regarded as politically motivated and surface during electoral periods. They are also interpreted as manifestations of the broader Hindutva ideology espoused by the Rashtriya Swayamsevak Sangh (RSS), a right-wing Hindutva paramilitary organisation, and the Bharatiya Janata Party (BJP), India’s current ruling political party.

== History ==
Following the partition of India, two weeks before his assassination, Mahatma Gandhi conducted a six-day fast in part to demand evacuation of mosques occupied by non-Muslims.

In 1991, the Places of Worship Act was passed to ban conversion of any worship place and to provide "for the maintenance of the religious character of any place of worship as it existed on the 15th day of August, 1947."

== Major incidents ==
=== Gyanvapi Mosque ===
The Gyanvapi Mosque was constructed in 1678. In 1991, a suit was filed claiming that mosque had been built on the site of a supposed Kashi Vishwanath temple. In 2024, a district court in Varanasi passed an order to allow Hindus to worship in a previously sealed basement inside the mosque. The verdict came following a report by the Archeological Survey of India (ASI), which determined that a "large Hindu temple" existed in the location prior to the construction of the mosque. The management committee of the mosque vehemently denied the claims. S. M. Yasin, the joint secretary of the mosque committee said, "Now we have no hope of justice in this country."

=== 1992 Babri Masjid demolition ===
The claim that the Babri Masjid, or Babri Mosque, was built on a site near the birthplace of the Hindu deity Rama was first made by Joseph Tiefenthaler, a Jesuit missionary. In 1788, Johann Barnoulli translated his account from French. In 1822 Hafizullah, an official of the Faizabad law court suggested that the Babri mosque was built on birthplace of Rama. In 1853, Bairagi Brahmins, a group of upper-caste Hindu ascetics claimed that the mosque was built on the site of the "Ramjanmabhoomi temple," which was supposedly destroyed by Babur (16th century), leading to a series of clashes between Hindus and Muslims at Ayodhya in 1855. Afterwards, a compromise was made that allowed Hindus to worship Rama on a chabootra (platform) close to the mosque. In 1883, a local pandit requested the construction of a temple on the chabootra, but the British denied the request due to its closeness to the mosque. In 1949, after Indian independence, idols of Rama and Sita were surreptitiously installed inside the mosque, which led to the closure of the mosque by the authorities.

The demand for the temple was revived in the 1980s and early 1990s by the Vishva Hindu Parishad (VHP) and the Bharatiya Janata Party (BJP). The demands led to a high-profile political rally which culminated in the demolition of the mosque by a far-right Hindu mob on 6 December 1992, with the goal of forcibly constructing a Hindu temple on the disputed site. Following the demolition, a report by the ASI claimed a temple had once existed on the site, though the claim was disputed by archaeologists and Muslim communities. In 2019 the Supreme Court of India ruled that the disputed land should be handed over to Hindus for the construction of a Ram temple. Under the premiership of Narendra Modi, the Ram Mandir, or Ram Temple, was consecrated on 22 January 2024, ahead of the Indian general election later that year.

=== Quwwat-ul-Islam Mosque ===
A 2020 case filed on behalf of Hindu god Vishnu sought reinstatement of Hindu and Jain idols inside the Quwwat-ul-Islam Mosque. It also alleged that 27 Hindu and Jain temples had been destroyed for the construction of the mosque. The suit was later dismissed by a civil judge in 2021.

=== Shamsi Jama Masjid ===
Shamsi Jama Masjid is a mosque in Badaun, Uttar Pradesh, originally built in the year 1223 by Iltutmish. In July 2022, a lawsuit was filed that alleged that Mosque was an "illegal structure" constructed on the site of a Shiva temple, the lawsuit also demanded the ownership of land and right to pray there. It was filed on behalf of a local farmer with the backing of Hindu nationalist right wing organisation Akhil Bharat Hindu Mahasabha.

=== Sanjauli Mosque ===
On 5 September 2024, Hindu right-wing groups organized a large protest at Chaura Maidan near the Himachal Pradesh Vidhan Sabha in Shimla, Himachal Pradesh, calling for the demolition of Sanjauli Mosque located in Sanjauli.

=== Atala Mosque, Jaunpur ===
The Swaraj Vahini Association claims the Atala Mosque was built after allegedly demolishing a 13th-century temple dedicated to Atala Devi. They filed a suit in May 2024 to declare the mosque as the Atala Devi Mandir and permit Hindu worship. The Waqf Atala Mosque challenged this in the Allahabad High Court, asserting it has always been a Muslim place of worship and denying the claims of it being a converted temple.

=== Uttarkashi protests ===
In October 2024, the anti-mosque protests were organised by Hindutva groups to demand demolition of a 55-year-old mosque situated near the Kashi Vishwanath temple in Uttarkashi district. These protests soon turned violent after Muslim-owned shops were vandalised. Four police officers were also injured.

=== Shahi Jama Masjid ===
In November 2024, a petition was filed by Hari Shankar Jain, a pro-Hindutva advocate in the Chandausi Civil Court alleging that the Shahi Jama Masjid in Sambhal was built over a 'Shri Hari Har Temple'. Following this, Civil Judge Aditya Singh directed the survey of the mosque, which resulted in violence. Commentators and scholars note the litigation to be part of a broader Hindu nationalist assault on Indian Muslims.

=== Shahi Idgah dispute ===
In Mathura, Uttar Pradesh a dispute originated when the Hindu side filed an original suit before the civil court claiming that the Shahi Idgah Masjid (mosque) was built on Krishna (a Hindu deity) Janmabhoomi (birthplace) land. The original suit filed in 2023 along with other connected petitions is pending before Allahabad High Court. In a recent hearing, the High Court directed the press to exercise caution when reporting court proceedings relating to the Krishna Janmabhoomi-Shahi Idgah case.

== See also ==
- Violence against Muslims in independent India
- Hindutva pseudohistory
- Religious violence in India
