= Shahi Jama Masjid =

Mosque in Sambhal, Uttar Pradesh, India

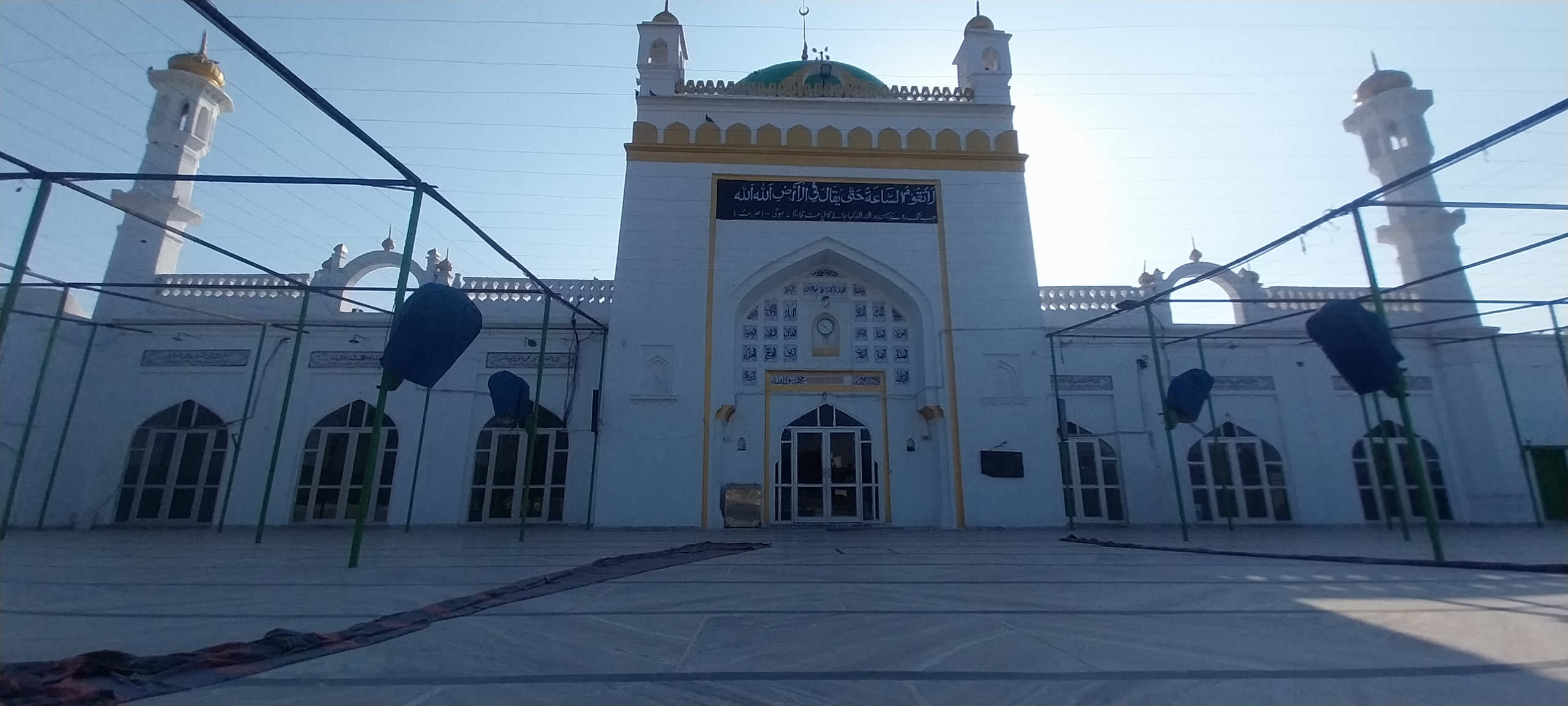
- Façade of the mosque in 2023

- Location of the mosque in Uttar Pradesh

Religion
- Affiliation: Islam
- Ecclesiastical or organisational status: Friday mosque
- Status: Active

Location
- Location: Sambhal, Uttar Pradesh
- Country: India
- Coordinates: 28°34′51″N 78°34′02″E

Architecture
- Type: Mosque architecture
- Style: Timurid; Sharqi
- Founder: Mir Hindu Beg (on orders of Emperor Babur)
- Established: December 6, 1526 CE

Specifications
- Direction of façade: East
- Dome: One (maybe more)
- Minaret: Two (maybe more)
- Inscriptions: Several

The Shahi Jama Masjid (Urdu: شاہی جامع مسجد) is a Friday mosque located in Sambhal, in the state of Uttar Pradesh, India. Established during the reign of the Mughal emperor Babur in December 1526, it is the oldest surviving Mughal-era mosque in South Asia. The mosque is a protected monument under the Ancient Monuments Protection Act, 1904.

== History ==
=== Establishment ===
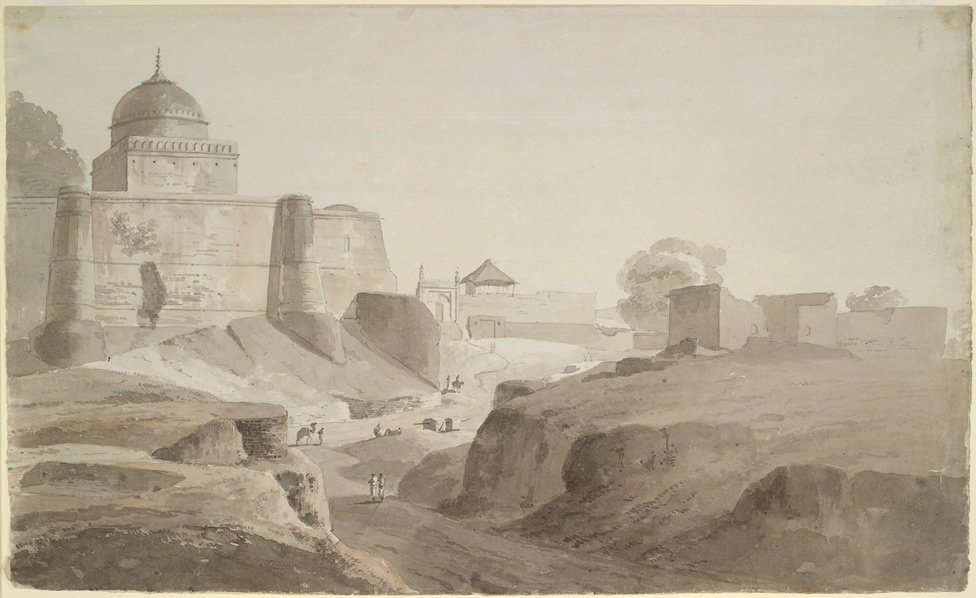
Pencil and wash drawing of the Sambhal Jama Masjid; 24 March 1789.

The mosque is situated atop the highest hillock in Sambhal, in muhalla Kot, the fortified old town. An extant inscription on the mihrab states the mosque to have been constructed upon the orders of Babur, by his general Mir Hindu Beg, by 6 December 1526. Thus the mosque was finished seven months after the Battle of Panipat, in which Babur conquered Delhi from Ibrahim Lodi, and is the oldest surviving Mughal-era mosque in South Asia.

However, both Catherine Asher and Ram Nath, scholars of Mughal architecture, doubt that Babur had any personal involvement. Asher suggests that the inscription might have merely alluded to Babur's permission to regional governors to construct mosques in newly gained territories; she calls it a "non-imperial mosque" as opposed to the Panipat mosque, that was constructed by Babur himself. Nath believes that Beg might have refurbished an older Lodi-era mosque.

== Architecture ==
The mosque is enclosed in a walled complex with a square-shaped courtyard that has a well and an ablution tank; the complex is accessible through a gate on the east.

The mosque has a rectangular prayer chamber—with the gateway set in the form of a high pishtaq—with a square-shaped central bay. The bay is enclosed by a dome, supported by stalactite pendentives and topped by a kalasha pinnacle. On either side of the chamber, there exists a three-bayed double-aisled arcade, covered by low flat domes. Behind the qibla wall of the central bay, lie two small rectangular chambers which open to these arcades. The exterior walls of the feature are flanked with large octagonal towers.

Repairs

Inscriptions on the mihrab attest to repairs undertaken in 1625–26 and 1656–57; in the former, the mosque was referred to as an "old mosque". Records of the mosque-keeper include a confirmation of the office in 1689 and multiple revenue-grants towards the maintenance of the mosque across the eighteenth century. Two inscriptions above the outer and inner arches of the central chamber record restorations effected by local Muslims about 1845.

=== Views ===
Burton-Page, a scholar of Indian architecture, notes the mosque to be imposing but "utterly undistinguished" in architectural novelty. Nath believes that the structure has been extensively improved upon, during the repairs, and hence, finds it impossible to guess the original plan of the mosque; Asher agrees with the nature of modifications but feels the original design to have survived nonetheless.

Asher notes a high degree of similarity with the Sharqi architecture of Jaunpur, especially in the usage of a high pishtaq, and suggests a reliance on local artisans. However, Syed Nadeem Ali Rezavi disputes such a lineage and highlights the influence of Timurid architectural conventions—the chahartaq pattern of the central bay, the high pishtaq, and the domed side arcades of a relatively low height.

== Claims of converted Hindu temple ==
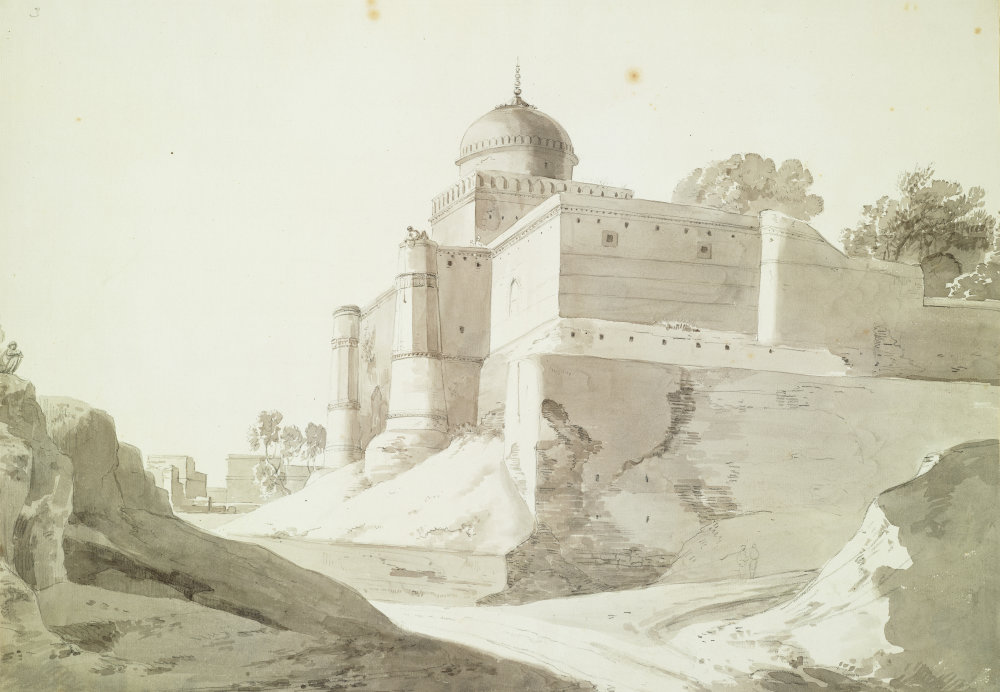
Perspective view of the mosque at Sambhal, Uttar Pradesh; March 1789.

Abul Fazl, the court chronicler of emperor Akbar, recorded in A'in-i-Akbari that Sambhal had a temple called Hari Mandal (Vishnu temple). The tenth of avatar of Vishnu, called Kalki, was believed to appear among the descendants of the Brahmin priest of that temple. Other scholars of Mughal court have also written about the temple, using names such as Har Mandir, and Har Mandil. These narrations are in line with Hindu religious texts. (Note: The Hindu texts however provide little detail about the location of Śaṃbala, with the exception of Kalki Purana, which is of a recent vintage. From at least the 11th century, the present day Sambhal became a place of pilgrimage with texts such as Tīrtha-pratyāmnāyāḥ mentioning it as a muktikṣetra, a place of salvation.)

In 1745, Ānand Rām Mukhliṣ, a Hindu scholar and official of the Mughal court, toured Sambhal and recorded the claim that Hari Mandal had been converted into a mosque. He recounted a line from Sikh Dasam Granth to identify the context of the temple:

Great is the fortune of Sambhal
Where Harji will come to the Harmandal. (Note: The line quoted by Mukhliṣ is an oft-repeated refrain in the Kalki avatar section of Dasam Granth: Bhalu Bhaaga Bhayaa Eih Saanbhala Ke Hari Joo Hari Maandari Aavahige ॥ It means that the town of Sambhal will be very fortunate because the Lord (Hari) will manifest Himself in (its) Hari temple.)

Mukhlis quoted an inscription on one of the arches saying that the mosque was constructed by Hindu Beg. However, he claimed that it was Babur's son, Humayun, who ordered the conversion of the temple to a mosque after receiving the district as his jagir. He also narrated that the Hindu pilgrims were still coming to a neighbouring tank and bathing in it as it was considered holy, with Brahmin priests and flower-sellers standing by. Mukhlis did not take umbrage at the conversion of the temple, remarking that what was a place of worship continued to be one.

In 1770, Aḥmad ʿAlī, a scribe under the employment of East India Company, toured Sambhal and produced an account similar to Mukhliṣ. About two decades later, Thomas Daniell and William Daniell etched two drawings of the mosque while travelling through Sambhal, noting it to be "on the site of a Hindoo temple."

In 1874, British archaeologist A. C. L. Carlleyle, working for the Archaeological Survey of India, surveyed the mosque and, according to Alexander Cunningham, determined that it was a converted Hindu temple. Carlleyle's report states that the bricks of the central bay were stripped of their stone casings before being plastered over, that the stones in the courtyard pathway contained fragments of Hindu sculptures underneath, and that the new bricks used for the side bays were smaller than those of the central bay. Thus, Carlleyle proposed that the central bay was indeed a Hindu temple that was converted into a mosque—wherein the stone casings with sculptures were stripped and repurposed as footsteps out of aniconic impulses—and followed up with the addition of new side bays.

Howard Crane, a scholar of Islamic art and architecture, doubts that the site of the mosque could have been ever occupied by a temple. In contrast, Ram Nath agrees that a temple was converted into the mosque and notes the pillars of the temple to have been reused.

=== Disputes during the British Rule ===
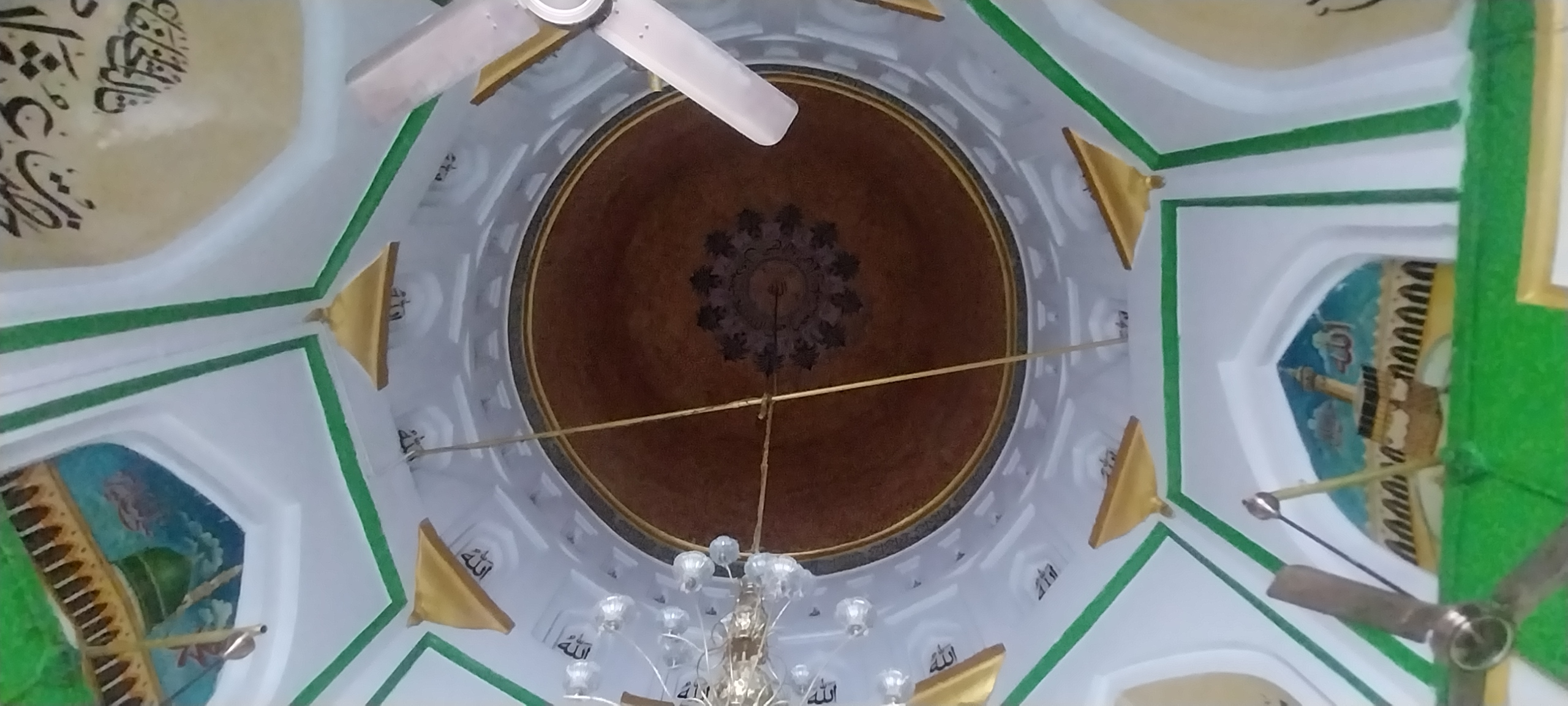
The interior of the central dome

In 1873, Ganga Prashad, deputy collector of the district, noted the mosque to still have the chain for the suspension of a bell, (Note: Syed Ali Nadeem Rezavi, a historian of Mughal India, notes that early medieval mosques in India frequently had a provision for a chain to hang a lamp or lantern to provide light.) and a passage at the back for parikrama carried out by Hindus. (Note: This is a likely references to the rear chambers mentioned as a "peculiar feature" under #Architecture above.) Around the same time, Carlleyle alleged local Muslims to have confessed to him about the extant inscriptions being forgeries and about how they had usurped total control of the site only around 1850. (Note: Given Mukhliṣ' and others' description of the mosque, about a century before him, Carlleyle's informers seem unreliable.)

In 1878, local Hindus filed a plea in the Moradabad Civil Court asking for the site to be returned to them; they lost the case having failed to prove that the Muslims did not have continuous possession of the site during the previous twelve years. In addition, the parikrama path did not go through the mosque and the witnesses for the Hindu side were noted to be of a "poor quality" who had never seen the inside of the mosque.

In 1920, the mosque was brought under the purview of the Ancient Monuments Protection Act, 1904, and designated as a protected monument.

=== Disputes in independent India ===
In 1976 the maulana of the mosque was murdered giving rise to rumours that a Hindu man had committed the murder. The local administration record says that it was actually committed by a Muslim man but some rioting followed, leading to long curfews.

On 19 November 2024, Vishnu Shankar Jain, known for his involvement in the Gyanvapi Dispute, filed a petition in the Chandausi Civil Court arguing that the mosque was built over a 'Shri Hari Har Temple' and asked for an immediate survey of the site. The prayer was granted ex parte and the survey was completed by the evening. Commentators and scholars note the litigation to be part of a broader Hindu nationalist assault on Indian Muslims.

On 24 November, there was an attempt at a fresh survey which gave rise to apprehensions that the surveyors were excavating the mosque; stone-pelting and arson followed, resulting in four deaths, likely from retaliatory police firing. A week later, the Supreme Court of India directed the Civil Court to pause all proceedings until the Allahabad High Court heard the Mosque Committee's challenge to the survey order; the Court ordered the survey report to not be unsealed and emphasised upon the responsibility of the government to maintain peace.

Local Hindus claim that they have always held the mosque to be Harihar Mandir and that they used to offer prayers at a nearby well till a few decades ago; local Muslims do not oppose the Hindu claims but assert that such a temple existed in the mosque's vicinity in ancient times, and not at the site itself.

In December 2024 a police station was built near the mosques, with resultant controversy.

== See also ==
- Islam in India
- List of mosques in India
- Bhojshala
