= 2022 Kanpur violence =

Kanpur violence
- Date: 4 June 2022
- Location: Kanpur, Uttar Pradesh, India
- Methods: Public demonstration and clashes

Casualties
- Deaths: none reported
- Injuries: 40+
- Arrested: 64

On June 3, hundreds of Muslims demonstrated after Friday prayers in Kanpur against the remarks on Muhammad made by former BJP spokesperson Nupur Sharma. Violence broke out after some Muslim demonstrators threw stones at police.

The violence broke out in Parade, Nai Sadak and Yateemkhana areas of the city on Friday when some people tried to force shopkeepers to close down the shops.

== Background ==
On 27 May 2022, Sharma participated in a debate on the Gyanvapi Mosque dispute on the Times Now television channel, in response to remarks by another speaker she perceived as derogatory to Shiva, she commented upon Muhammad and the age of one of his wives, Aisha, noting that Aisha was 6-years-old when married, and 9 when the marriage was consummated.

== Violence ==
The Muslim community had announced the closure of shops after Friday prayer over the remarks on the Prophet. From Thursday, an appeal was being made to close the shops by putting up posters in the area. Police officers and other officers reached the spot soon after the incident, tried to control the incident by using necessary force.

Hayat Zafar Hashmi, chief of Maulana Mohammed Ali (MMA) Jauhar Fans Association called for a bandh (shutdown) of local shops in protest of comments from Sharma. They also planned to take out a procession and called to shut down shops at parade market during which they confronted with the members of other community as a result of which clashes broke out.

Other incidents of violence included damages to several vehicles. Unconfirmed reports suggested some protesters threw crude bombs at the law enforcement officials.

The clashes occurred at Nai Sadak, Yateemkana and Parade area of Kanpur. Protesters pelted stones, fired shots, and lobbed petrol bombs at law enforcement officials who in return used batons to control the mob.

== Aftermath ==
After the violence, few shops remained open in the Muslim-dominated areas such as Becon Ganj, Yatim Khana and Nai Sarak.

On 4 June, Uttar Pradesh Chief Minister Yogi Adityanath talked with enforcement officials via video conference and directed the officials to take strict action against those responsible for the violence. He also asked for increased deployment of police force in affected areas and regular patrolling in the sensitive areas of the district.

Rashtriya Lok Dal condemned the violence and prompted for peace.

On 5 June, flag marches were held in the affected areas of the city, and companies of the Provincial Armed Constabulary (PAC) were deployed.

Lucknow police were holding peace meetings with Muslim groups in Kanpur.

BJP leader Mohsin Raza said the violence was pre-planned to coincide with Indian Prime Minister Narendra Modi's visit to the region.

Editors Guild of India blamed some news channels for intentionally "creating circumstances that target vulnerable communities by spewing hatred towards them and their beliefs".

== Investigation ==
Initially, the Uttar Pradesh Police Saturday booked 500 people over the charges of rioting and arrested 18.

The city police commissioner constituted a SIT for detailed investigation in connection with rioting and violence in Kanpur's Parade area. FIRs was lodged in the case in which 40 people have been charged with rioting and 1,000 others have been mentioned as unidentified. The Uttar Pradesh Police on June 4 arrested the main accused Hayat Zafar Hashmi and three others were also arrested from the Hazaratganj police station area of Lucknow. The police have also found documents of four organizations like AICC, SDPI, CFI and RIF have been found with Hashmi.

The Kanpur Police has identified local Muslim leader Hayat Zafar Hashmi, national president of the Maulana Muhammad Jauhar Ali Fans Association, as the main conspirator behind the violence that erupted in the city, he was arrested from Lucknow. It is alleged that Hashmi incited the people, which led to stone pelting and clashes between two groups. In the past, Hashmi was also allegedly involved in violent demonstrations against the proposed CAA and the NRC in Kanpur.Police were also investigating the links between protestors and the Islamic outfit Popular Front of India (PFI). Evidence of foreign funding through transactions in bank accounts of the accused have been also discovered.

On 4 June, Kanpur police commissioner Vijay Singh Meena said that the gangster act will be imposed on the accused.

On 5 June, a curfew has been imposed in Bareilly till 3 July after a Muslim cleric Tauqir Raza announced large protests for 10 June.

As of 7 June, about 50 were arrested.

The FIR has been registered against three individuals who operated Twitter handles such as 'Duggalsahab15', 'shivaisrael' and 'AkhandBharat', and two Facebook account holders Abu Zaid and Kaushal Patel.

A petrol pump situated nearby the Deputy Padav was sealed crossing on 7 June after a CCTV footage showed people taking fuel in bottles prior to violence.
