= Miraj Riots =

The Miraj Riots refer to a series of communal clashes that erupted in Miraj, a town in the Sangli district of Maharashtra, India, in September 2009. The violence was triggered during the Ganesh Chaturthi festival, leading to curfews, casualties, and significant political repercussions. The riots highlighted underlying communal tensions in the region and drew widespread attention due to their impact on the state's law-and-order situation.

== Background ==
Miraj, located in the Sangli district of Maharashtra, is a historically significant town known for its multicultural population. The town has a sizable Muslim population alongside Hindus and other communities. In September 2009, tensions escalated due to the erection of an arch depicting the historical event of Chhatrapati Shivaji Maharaj killing Afzal Khan, a general of the Adilshahi empire, during the Ganesh Chaturthi festival. This portrayal was perceived as provocative by a section of the population, leading to communal unrest.

The political climate in Maharashtra at the time was charged, with the state preparing for assembly elections. Political parties, including the Bharatiya Janata Party (BJP) and the Nationalist Congress Party (NCP), were accused of exploiting the situation for electoral gains.

== Riots ==
The riots broke out in Miraj on 2 September 2009, triggered by the erection of an arch depicting Chhatrapati Shivaji Maharaj killing Afzal Khan during the Ganesh Chaturthi festival. The violence quickly escalated, with incidents of stone-pelting, arson, and clashes between groups. One person was killed during the unrest, and several others were injured. The NDTV reported that the violence spread to nearby Sangli, prompting the authorities to impose a curfew in both towns on 6 September 2009.

The Hindustan Times reported that the situation became so severe that shoot-at-sight orders were issued in Miraj to control the violence. The riots disrupted the Ganesh immersion processions, a significant part of the festival, leading to further tension. Despite the unrest, the Ganesh immersion was eventually completed peacefully under heavy police presence, as reported by The Hindu.

== Investigations ==
Following the riots, investigations pointed to political and administrative lapses. The Indian Express reported that the BJP blamed the Maharashtra government, then led by the Congress-NCP alliance, for failing to control the situation. NCP leader Jayant Patil described the violence as a "conspiracy," suggesting political motivations behind the unrest.

BJP leader Gopinath Munde accused the police of mishandling the situation, leading to his detention at Mumbai airport when he attempted to visit Miraj. An NCP leader was arrested in connection with the riots, highlighting internal conflicts within the party. The Indian Express also noted that the violence exposed fault lines within the NCP, with political rivalries contributing to the unrest.

== Aftermath ==
The riots led to a prolonged curfew in Miraj and Sangli, which was relaxed gradually after an all-party meeting. The Hindu reported that the day curfew was lifted in both towns, though night curfews remained in place for some time. The Hindustan Times noted that the situation eventually stabilised, but tensions lingered in the region.

Politically, the riots had a significant impact. In November 2009, the Shiv Sena planned to display giant posters of Chhatrapati Shivaji Maharaj killing Afzal Khan to mark the 350th death anniversary of Afzal Khan, intending to observe it as an anti-terrorism day. However, the Mumbai Police made a no-objection certificate (NOC) mandatory to prevent further communal tension, and the Sena threatened to proceed without permission, leading to heightened police vigilance. The BJP sought to gain electoral mileage from the unrest, while the Shiv Sena also announced protests in response to the violence. The Economic Times described the Maharashtra government as being in "fire-fighting mode" to restore normalcy ahead of the assembly elections. India Today highlighted how the "politics of hatred" had gripped the Maharashtra hinterland during this period.

In a significant legal development, a district court in Sangli acquitted all 106 accused in the Miraj riot case in 2023. Separately, the Maharashtra government withdrew cases against 51 individuals involved in the riots in 2023. Mid-Day reported that a "bond signed in blood" was proposed as a symbolic gesture to restore peace between communities after the violence.
