= 2023 Satara riots =

2023 riots in northern India

The 2023 Satara riots were a series of clashes in northern India that originated in the state of Maharashtra. An objectionable social media post and comments by two youths from a community triggered tension between the Hindu & Muslim communities, leading to communal clashes. In response to the post, there was violent retaliation and stone pelting.

== Background ==
On August 18, 2023, insulting comments against the Hindu deities Lord Rama and Lady Sita on Instagram went viral on social media. A 21 year old Muslim resident of Pusesavali village in Satara district was accused of having made the comments. In response, the Hindu community organised a protest. Tensions raged for multiple weeks between the two communities. On August 15 and September 10, derogatory comments on Instagram against Lord Rama and the Maratha ruler Shivaji Maharaj went viral. Two 23 year old Muslims and a Muslim teenager from the village were accused of having made the comments. This led to increased tensions; as the city of Satara was the capital of the Maratha Empire, residents of the districts are proud of the legacy, religious and quick to react to any negative comments.

Tensions were already rife in the area when abusive comments on Instagram against the figures named above went viral in June. Muslim teenagers & young adults from the nearby city of Kolhapur were accused of having made the comments.

== Riots ==
Youth from the Hindu community attacked mosques and Muslim owned shops in Pusesavali on September 10 when the post cited above went viral. 31 year old Nurul Hasan Shikalgar, an engineer & businessman, was at one of the mosques attacked and died from wounds to the head. 10 other people were injured and 23 were arrested.
