= Bombay Courier =

Defunct newspaper of British India

The Bombay Courier edition of 23 November 1816

The Bombay Courier was an English language newspaper, first printed in 1790 in Bombay, India by William Ashburner. It followed the Bombay Herald (later renamed the Bombay Gazette), founded in 1789. In 1847, it merged with the Bombay Telegraph to form the Telegraph and Courier.
