= 2022 Shivamogga riots =

The 2022 Shivamoga riots took place in the city of Shivamoga, India, due to the murder of Bajrang Dal activist Harsha Jingade.

== Causes ==
The 26-year-old Hindu activist was murdered by six Muslims. He was defending the Karnataka government's regulation on uniforms that barred students from wearing any religious attire inside educational institutions. He was primarily involved in the hijab protest. Six Muslims saw a message related to this on Jingade's Facebook page and decided to kill him on 23 February. However, police suspect that his past criminal record was the motive.

== Riot ==
The riot happened during the funeral procession for 26-year-old Hindutva activist Harsha Jingade. The procession was led by senior BJP leaders. It violated section 144 of the criminal code. Eyewitnesses and police sources estimate the number of attendees at around 600. Despite the law, violence took place in Muslim-dominated areas like Azad Nagar, OT Road, Gandhi Bazar, Seegehatti, Siddaiah Nagar, Urdu Bazar and Clarke Pete. Bajrang Dal members were among the 5,000 people who participated, defying prohibitions. The crowds indulged in violence, vandalism and arson and chanted religious slogans and death threats to the Muslim community. The protestors attacked Muslim shops and establishments. Private property in local Muslim residential areas was attacked. Stones were thrown at garment stores and other commercial establishments.

The violence that began in the Segehatti area spread quickly across Gandhi Bazar, Nehru Road, Ramanna Shetty Park and finally was brought under control at the Shivappa Nayaka Circle. Police fired tear gas and performed latti charges on protestors. At least 10 people were injured in the stone-throwing incidents and around 8 vehicles were damaged by arson. Two photojournalists, a policeman and a woman were among the injured.

== Violence against Muslims ==
During the riots, violence and hate crimes against Muslims took place. Hindu supporters allegedly vandalized and set fire to at least four vehicles belonging to Muslims, attacked Muslim houses, and vandalized and burned their shops, garment shops and commercial establishments. They shouted religious slogans, death threats and threw stones.
