= 1917 Shahabad Riots =

1917 Shahbad Riots
- Part of religious violence in India
- Date: 1917
- Location: Bihar, India
- Caused by: Cow Slaughter on Bakr-id Placing pigs near mosques during the Gaidar festival
- Methods: Rioting, pogrom, arson, rape, mass murder

The Shahabad Riots of 1917 were a major episode of communal violence in colonial Bihar, India, primarily between Hindu and Muslim communities. They occurred in the broader context of religious revivalist movements, particularly the Arya Samaj's cow protection campaigns and Muslim responses through organizations like the Tableegh Jamaat. The riots mark one of the earliest large-scale communal breakdowns in Bihar, prefiguring the deep Hindu-Muslim fault lines that would intensify during the 1920s and 1930s.

== Background ==
The late 19th and early 20th centuries saw the growth of Hindu revivalist groups such as the Arya Samaj in Bihar. The movement, led by Dayanand Saraswati, emphasized the revitalization of Vedic Hinduism, cow protection, and the Shuddhi (reconversion) campaign targeting Muslims and Christians. By the 1880s, Arya Samaj had established Gaurakshini Sabhas (Cow Protection Societies) across western Bihar, particularly in Patna, Saran, Shahabad, and Gaya, attracting upper-caste support and later participation from Ahirs, Kurmis, and Koeris seeking social upliftment. These caste-based mobilizations often blurred the line between religious revival and political assertion, providing a grassroots base for Hindu nationalist agendas.

In parallel, Muslim revivalist movements, including the Tableegh Jamaat, emerged to counter Arya Samaj's reconversion efforts and protect Islamic identity, education, and values. While the Tableegh Jamaat would formalize only in 1926, its ideological precursors—such as the Deobandi reformist networks—were already active in Shahabad, promoting Islamic orthodoxy and resisting syncretic practices.

== Causes ==
Cow slaughter during Bakr Id in Ibrahimpur angered Hindu groups. Hindus retaliated during the Gaidar festival by placing pigs near mosques, escalating tensions. Growing communal polarization, amplified by Shuddhi campaigns, Arya Samaj literature, and Muslim reformist resistance, laid the groundwork for violent conflict. The British colonial "Divide and Rule" policy and the introduction of separate electorates further strained Hindu-Muslim relations. Additionally, the rise of print capitalism—especially vernacular newspapers—amplified communal rhetoric, often publishing exaggerated or inflammatory reports.

Religious tensions had already been escalating due to repeated Hindu efforts to curb cow slaughter during Bakr Id, a practice Muslims considered central to their religious tradition. At the same time, the Shuddhi movement was perceived by Muslims as an aggressive form of forced reconversion and cultural erasure.

Tensions in Ibrahimpur had initially been addressed through a compromise—Muslims agreed not to slaughter cows during Bakr Id, and Hindus agreed not to use pigs to provoke during Gaidar. However, the breakdown of this fragile understanding became the immediate trigger for violence. Inflammatory leaflets (patias) circulated among Hindu groups, urging mass mobilization to defend cow protection. These patias used incendiary language, invoking shame and emasculation to coerce participation, and even claimed that the German emperor and Hindu rulers supported the campaign. These leaflets often reached rural households through temple networks and Arya Samaj schools, showing the reach of ideological propaganda into agrarian Bihar.

== Riots ==
The riots were widespread, impacting areas from Arrah to Aurangabad. Estimated 20,000 to 50,000 participants were involved. Over 5,000 people were killed, and around 70,000 were displaced in just one week. The violence included mob killings, forced conversions, and attacks on religious symbols (e.g., desecration of mosques and the Quran). Women were targeted for sexual violence, including rape, leading some to commit suicide by jumping into wells. Local zamindars and militia groups were at times complicit or passive, their allegiances shaped by caste affiliations and local power equations.

The riots showed signs of meticulous organization. Mobs moved from village to village in tight formations, sometimes so dense that lathis had to be carried upright. Local networks provided food and shelter, suggesting a high level of coordination.In villages where negotiations failed, violence followed swiftly. The destruction of mosques and homes was often systematic, accompanied by the public tearing of Qurans and humiliation of community leaders. British officials later recorded that in many villages, Muslim women stood silently before magistrates, weeping, but unwilling to testify due to shame—interpreted by officers as unspoken confirmation of mass sexual violence. In some cases, even British officers expressed shock at the scale of violence, noting in reports that the riots bore signs of “military-like precision,” with advance planning, stockpiled weapons, and predetermined targets.

== Aftermath ==
The riots intensified communal divisions in Bihar, with rising support for separatist ideologies. Gandhi, engaged in the Champaran Satyagraha, was unable to intervene directly but appealed for cow slaughter to be stopped. His focus on cow protection, while intended as a conciliatory gesture, was perceived by many Muslims as partisan and culturally insensitive. The All India Muslim League's 9th session in 1917 criticized Hindu leaders for ignoring Muslim suffering. The violence deepened disenchantment with Congress, seen by some Muslims as non-secular. Notably, the joint statement by Hasan Imam and Mazharul Haq avoided direct mention of the riots, attempting to maintain a façade of communal unity—further aggravating grassroots Muslim anger. The Khilafat Committee's later involvement in Shuddhi cases further radicalized Muslim sentiments. The events of 1917 also catalyzed the rise of parallel Muslim political formations in Bihar, such as the Anjuman Islamia and later Muslim Majlis-e-Mushawarat, which aimed to represent Muslim grievances outside the Congress framework.

== Bibliography ==
Sajjad, Mohammad (2014). Muslim Politics in Bihar. Taylor & Francis (published August 13, 2014). ISBN 9781317559825.
