= 2016 Coimbatore riots =

2016 riots in Coimbatore, India

- Date: September 22–24, 2016
- Location: Coimbatore, Tamil Nadu
- Caused by: Murder of Hindu Munnani functionary C Sasikumar
- Methods: Rioting; arson; burglary; looting
- Result: Riot stopped after 2 days

Casualties
- Injuries: 12 Police men from stone pelting; 3 Police suffered fire burns
- Arrested: 650 people, mostly from Hindu Munnani
- Detained: 305 Hindu Munnani members; 2 BJP members

Damages
- All damages: 10 private vehicles including an autorickshaw burned down; 6 Police Vehicles including a police Jeep burned down; 34 government buses; 39 shops belonging to Muslims; 15 shops belonging to Hindus

Total estimated cost of the damages : ₹5 Crores

The 2016 Coimbatore riots was a series of riots that took place in Coimbatore from September 22 to September 24, 2016, by members of the Hindu Munnani after the murder of the outfit's district spokesperson, C Sasikumar.

== Background ==
Sasikumar was attacked when he was returning to his home in his motor-cycle when unidentified men chased him in their motor-cycles and assaulted him with Sickles on September 22, 2016, in Subramaniampalayam, a place in the outskirts of the city. Despite his injuries he managed to escape and later died in a private hospital.

Meanwhile, more than 500 members of the Hindu Munnani gathered near the Coimbatore Medical College and Hospital(CMCH) where his body was taken for autopsy. The Hindu Munnani state president who also warned of "another Gujarat" in Tamil Nadu, called for a state-wide bandh in the following day.

== Riots ==
The violence reportedly started within hours of his murder on September 22 when three mosques were attacked with petrol bombs.

During the funeral procession of Sasikumar from CMCH to Subramaniampalayam which was participated by mob consisting of members Hindu Munnani, Rashtriya Swayamsevak sangh (RSS) and BJP. Members of the Hindu Munnani started destroying the window panes of several shops and attacked several houses and commercial establishments mostly of Muslims, along their way. The mob also pelted stones at the buses and attacked several places of worship creating chaos. When the procession reached the Thudiyalur, where Sasikumar lived, the mob turned their rage at the police and started pelting stones at the police which injured 12 policemen and also burned a Police jeep. Media persons covering the funeral procession were also attacked and three police officers also sustained burn injuries.

The mob also set several cars on fire and some members set fire and ransacked several Shops. 1 Police jeep and an auto-rickshaw were burned down and at least 30 government buses were damaged by the rioters. Eyewitness claimed that the mob went on a looting spree even in-front of the watching police.

A Muslim man's mobile phone shop at Tutiyalur was looted and ransacked allegedly by members of Hindutva outfits after they broke into the shop at the night of September 24. The CCTV video of the looting quickly went viral on social media. The Muslim Community alleged that Muslim businesses were mostly targeted by the rioters.

Tensions also prevailed in Tiruppur and most of the Shops were closed down in both the cities during the rampage. Some schools were also closed. Six special police teams have been formed to catch the rioters. Meanwhile, Muslim organizations asked the collector for an intervention by district administration to end the violence by Hindutva outfits.

== Damages ==
A joint petition by the Forum for Coimbatore People's Unity including several advocate's and political parties to the district collector in January 2019, reported that the rioters of the Hindu Munnani had damaged 10 private vehicles, 34 government buses, 39 shops belonging to Muslims, 15 shops belonging to the Hindus and 6 Police Vehicles. The report estimated the damages to about 5 crores. The petition asked the district administration to collect 5 crores from Hindu Munnani and also accused the Hindu Munnani of trying to get political gains from the riots.

== Arrests ==
The Coimbatore police reported that it had arrested more than 650 people involved in the unrest on September 26. Of them 129 remained in custody for allegedly planning violence and involvement in violence and the remaining were given bail. The police also warned that the number would go up. As of September 27, a total of 305 Hindu Munnani members were arrested.

In October 2016, Two members of the Bharatiya Janata Party were arrested for their involvement in the riots under the Goondas Act and were sent to the Vellore Central Prison.

== Investigation ==
Director general of police, Ramesh. K Ramanujam said that there is an issue in the investigation for the case, because not every murder was communal in nature and a series of murders in the state for the past few years have been given communal colour by Hindutva groups in an attempt to spread their ideologies. A senior police officer said that some members of Hindutva outfits have known criminal records and when caught they try to use their religion to escape from the law.
