= 2024 Bahraich violence =

Riots in response to murder in Uttar Pradesh, India

Coordinates: 27.614736°N 81.2436°E

Bahraich violence
- Date: October 2024
- Location: Bahraich, Uttar Pradesh, India
- Methods: Riots, Arson

Casualties
- Death: 1 killed
- Arrested: 13

On 13 October 2024, Bahraich saw communal violence between the Hindus and the Muslims following the murder of a Hindu man named Ramgopal Mishra, who was shot to death by Saif Ali Khan, Mohammad Shoaib, and Javed Khan, for allegedly removing a flag.

== Protests ==
During the protest, Muslim households were selectively targeted, and many Muslims had to flee their homes out of fear for their lives. A number of vehicles and properties were burned by the rioters following the murder of Mishra.

== Response ==
Due to the violence the internet services were shut down for four days in the violence affected area.

Uttar Pradesh government issued demolition notices against buildings owned by people involved in the incident. But after the concerned parties approached Supreme Court the UP government withdrew the notices. The notices of demolitions were seen as an act of bulldozer justice.

The PWD department also served demolition notices to 23 establishments. Out of these, 20 belonged to the Muslim community (including Abdul Hameed's house), and three to the Hindu community. BJP MLA from Mahsi, Sureshwar Singh, said, "People are vacating their shops. Those who don't will be dealt with by the administration."

A total of 87 arrests have been made. As of 22 March 2025, most of the arrested individuals have made bail, leaving only 13 people in jail.

On October 3, 2025, media reported that the stringent National Security Act was invoked against eight jailed accused.

== Reaction ==
Former UP CM Akhilesh Yadav blamed BJP for 'orchestrating' communal violence in Uttar Pradesh's Bahraich district, in which one person was killed and several others injured, to 'gain mileage' in the forthcoming assembly bypolls in the state. He also said that administrative failure led to Bahraich violence and asked the UP government about "what was being played on the loudspeaker?"

The wife (Roli Mishra) of the man shot dead (Ramgopal Mishra) has demanded death sentence for her husband's alleged killers. The wife also accused the authorities of allegedly taking bribes she said "We want justice, but we are being denied it. Authorities have taken bribes."

== Aftermath ==
The government announced that Roli Mishra, the wife of the deceased Ramgopal Mishra, would receive a government job. However, Roli has stated that despite the promises made by the government, she has not yet received the job. Roli also said that "the two-room house is almost complete, but the plastering is still unfinished". Roli mentioned "that out of the 500,000 rupees we received, 450,000 have been spent. We have saved 50,000 rupees, but due to a lack of funds, the house cannot be completed." Roli also accused the local administration of neglect.

In a report by the Dainik Bhaskar's team on 21 March 2025, they visited areas affected by recent violence to assess the current situation. While the overall environment seems normal, a noticeable divide between the communities of both religions is evident. Hindus are avoiding shopping at Muslim-owned stores, and the same holds true for Muslims.

== See also ==
- Religious violence in India
- Communal violence
- Hindutva pop
- Hindutva
