= A. C. L. Carlleyle =

English archaeologist (1831–1897)

Archibald Campbell Carlyle (1831–1897) was an English archaeologist active in India.

The Archaeological Survey of India was revived as a distinct department of the government and Sir Alexander Cunningham was appointed as Director General, taking office in February 1871. Cunningham was given two assistants: J. D. Beglar and Carlleyle. They were later joined by H. B. W. Garrik. Carlleyle handled the Agra region for the Report of 1871–72, while Beglar was responsible for Delhi.

In 1867–68, Carlleyle discovered paintings on the walls and ceilings of rock shelters in Sohagighat, in the Mirzapur district. He was the first to claim a Stone Age antiquity for these. He also made many other important contributions to archaeology in India. He is credited with finding of 20 copper and 4 silver punch-marked coins at Bahraich, near the ancient city of Benaras (modern Varanasi).
