= Bombay Dog Riots =

Series of riots and protest actions

- Location: Mumbai, India
- Caused by: Culling of stray dogs by the Bombay Magistrates of Police
- Goals: Stop the mass-culling of dogs
- Methods: Civil disobedience, boycotting, rioting
- Result: Several arrests; colonial policy towards dog culling changed to allow for dog relocation

Parties
Mumbai parsis	British colonial authorities

Number
Several thousand protesters	Several hundred garrison soldiers and city officials

Casualties
- Injuries: several
- Arrested: several

The Bombay Dog Riots, also known as the 1832 Bombay Riots, were a series of protests that devolved into rioting in the city of Bombay, which was then under British colonial rule. The riots were sparked by an attempt by municipal colonial authorities to exterminate the city's stray dogs, which was opposed by Bombay's Parsis due to dogs being considered sacred in Zoroastrianism. The event was the first instance of rioting in the modern history of Bombay.

== Background ==
Mumbai, known as Bombay until the late 20th century, has long been a center for trade and commerce in Western India. Due to the city's important position at the mouth of four rivers, the city became a haven for both domestic and foreign merchant communities. One such group was the Parsis, who had fled Persia in the aftermath of the Muslim conquest of Persia in the 7th century. The Parsis followed the teachings of the Prophet Zoroaster, and subscribed to Iranian Zoroastrianism. Once in Bombay, the Parsis quickly ingrained themselves into the city's thriving trade network; thus, the Parsi population of the city grew wealthy and influential. They also developed their own sub-sect of Zoroastrianism which melded Persian and Indian beliefs.

Beginning in the 16th century, European powers began to send merchants and soldiers to India to take control of local trade. Bombay fell under Portuguese rule in 1534, which lasted until the English East India Company (EIC) took control of the port in 1661. Whereas the Portuguese had used Bombay as a trade outpost in India, the English chose instead to invest company funds in developing the city. In addition, the EIC began a policy (formulated by Gerald Aungier, the second governor of Bombay) of cooperating with Bombay's merchant communities by offering them protection and business incentives; one of the groups that took advantage of this was the Parsis, who were sometimes referred to as the Shetias. The Parsis and the new administration were noted as having gotten along well, as many Parsis were employed by the administration which allowed the practice of the Parsi faith in Bombay. By 1826, around 10,000 Parsis lived in Bombay, which had a total population of 200,000.

== Riots ==
In 1832, Bombay's magistrate of police decided to adopt measures to control the city's stray dog population. The city was filled with so-called "pariah dogs", which were seen by colonial authorities as a nuisance and a threat to public safety. A regulation had been in place since 1813 that allowed for the killing of ownerless dogs during the hottest parts of the Bombay summer (15 April - 15 May, and 15 September - 15 October); the new regulation would extend the first period of culling from 15 May to 15 June. The change in the regulation was not controversial, but the magistrate also chose to adopt new methods to cull the dog population. Most significantly, it was decided that a bounty would be paid for each dog killed. This new policy resulted in unscrupulous or overzealous dog catchers killing dogs that were not overly aggressive; it was also reported that dog catchers were invading homes and killing private pets.

A backlash formed against the dog culling policy. As noted by the Bombay Courier, the magistrate was seen by Bombay's Indian population as overusing his power. The Parsi community was particularity offended, as the extended culling period meant that the slaughter coincided with a Parsi holy day (Adar month, adar day); furthermore, some Parsis revered dogs as objects of religious significance and began to protest the magistrate's efforts. On 6 June, a crowd of Parsis attacked a group of dog catchers near Bombay's fort and then marched on the city's court to demand an end to the culling. The next day, many in the Parsi community closed their businesses, causing economic chaos in the city. Lower class Parsis and a collection of Hindus and Muslims went on strike, paralyzing more of the city's day-to-day activities. When word circulated that the authorities were mobilizing the city's garrison, the Parsis organized crowds to block porters and laborers in a successful attempt to prevent any soldiers from receiving food and water. In the evening, the garrison gathered in the city's fort and the Riot Act was read aloud; the crowd was subsequently dispersed, and the leaders of the strike were arrested. The colonial authorities then began to negotiate with the leaders of the Parsi community in an attempt to return order to the city. It was decided that, rather than cull stray dogs on sight, the authorities would instead try to relocate dogs outside of the city. This was done, and the imprisoned protesters were released as they had not had a political motivation for striking.

== Aftermath ==
The year after the riots, the new dog culling policy resulted in many of the animals being relocated to the outskirts of Bombay. The event also increased the already-prevalent influence of the Parsi community in Bombay.

== See also ==
- Dogs in religion
