= 2016 Kaliachak riots =

Kaliachak
- Date: 3 January 2016
- Location: Malda district, West Bengal, India; 24°48′N 88°02′E
- Methods: Public demonstration and clashes

Casualties
- Death: none reported
- Injuries: 30+
- Arrested: 10
- Location of place of riots in West Bengal, India

Riots broke out in Kaliachak, Malda district in West Bengal, India on 3 January 2016. Muslims were protesting the remark of political leaders Kamlesh Tiwari. The protest turned into riots when a Muslim mob of more than 1 lakh people attacked the police and vandalised the police station of Kaliachak area.

A section of that protest rally turned violent when infurious protestors tried to broke barricades and confronted the police and Border Security Force (BSF). Mob vandalized Kaliachak Police station, block development office and public property injuring 30 policemen. Several private and government vehicles including BSF and North Bengal State Transport Corporation (NBSTC) vehicles were torched. The train service was disturbed as protesters blocked railway tracks at Khaltipur railway station.

However, in a subsequent investigation, the violence was determined to have resulted from rivalry between the poppy mafias who were present as protestors and attacked the Police and Border Security Force as according to police about 1500 acre poppy field has been destroyed by the administration the previous week.

== Background ==
The Malda district of West Bengal has a mixed population comprising Hindus and Muslims. According to the 2011 Census of India, Malda district has comparable Muslim and Hindu populations, whereas in Kaliachak Muslims are the majority. This district also shares border with Bihar and Jharkhand and an international border with Bangladesh.

=== Remarks on homosexuality ===
Section 377 of the Indian Penal Code (IPC) dating back to 1861, made homosexual sex punishable by law and carried a life sentence. In 2009, the High Court of Delhi found the law unconstitutional, effectively invalidating the ban. Four years later, on 11 December 2013, the Supreme Court reversed the lower court's decision, restoring the statute while leaving it to the Lok Sabha to amend the law. Since re-criminalisation, several politicians, including former External Affairs Minister Shashi Tharoor and Bharatiya Janata Party Finance Minister Arun Jaitley opined in favour of legal decriminalisation.

Jaitley opinionated to reconsider judgement on homosexuality by Supreme Court on 28 November 2015 at Times Literature Festival in Mumbai. On 2 December, Azam Khan, a Muslim senior politician of the Samajwadi Party and a member of Uttar Pradesh Legislative Assembly, responded to Jaitley's speech by saying that Rashtriya Swayamsevak Sangh members are homosexuals as they do not get married. The next day, Kamlesh Tiwari who claimed to be the working president of Akhil Bharatiya Hindu Mahasabha called Prophet Muhammad the first homosexual in the world. He was arrested in Lucknow on 3 December 2015. A case under IPC sections 153-A (promoting enmity between groups on ground of religion and doing acts prejudicial to maintenance of harmony) and 295-A (deliberate and malicious acts, intended to outrage religious feelings of any class by insulting its religion or religious beliefs) was registered against him at Naka Hindola police station, Lucknow. Protest rallies, against his statement, were held by several Islamic groups across the nation, most of them demanding death by hanging.

== Protests and violence ==
Idara-e-Shariya and Anjuman Ahle Sunnatul Jamat, a Muslim organisation had held a protest gathering with prior permissions from concerned authorities in Kaliachak on 3 January 2016 demanding death by hanging of Tiwari which was attended by 30,000 to 2.5 lakh Muslims. A set of people from the protest rally turned violent and vandalized Kaliachak Police station, block development office and public property. Several private and government vehicles including Border Security Force (BSF) vehicles were torched. An NBSTC bus was also torched on National Highway 34 leaving several vehicles stranded on the highway. Over 30 people including police officers were injured. The train service was disturbed as protesters blocked railway tracks at Khaltipur railway station. When police stopped protesters, the riot broke out. According to some news reports, Shani Temple, Durga Temple and other Hindu temples were attacked at Baliadanga and around 25 houses and shops owned by Hindus were vandalized.

Kaliachak, a place near an international border, is considered as a passage of mafia and anti-socials of the neighboring states, and has become a depot of many anti-social activities. Crimes like keeping illegal arms, cultivation of poppy, dealing of fake note, illegal drag trafficking are rapidly growing in this region. According to some news reports, taking the scope of religious outrage local goons who had criminal cases against them attacked the police station to destroy the evidences against them.

Police had to fire 40 blank rounds in an attempt to control the mobs. Rapid Action Force (RAF) personnel were deployed to control the situation. RSS activist Gopal Tiwari was injured in the firing. After the violence, police put in restrictions on people assembling by invoking section 144 of the Code of Criminal Procedure. Ten members of a BJP delegation, led by the sole party MLA of the state, Samik Bhattacharya, were stopped near Rathbari area as their appearance could fuel the agitation. The members arrested by the police were later released. Also, a three-member fact finding team of the BJP led by MP S. S. Ahluwalia was also deported from the Malda station.

The Malda chapter of the civil rights organisation, Association for Democratic Rights (APDR), has issued a statement that last Sunday's incident cannot be called "communal by a long shot." Malda district secretary of APDR, Jishnu Roy Chowdhury, has blamed miscreants for "triggering" unprecedented violence, which is "a symptom of lawlessness in the State."

== Poppy field destruction ==
According to some news reports, illegal poppy cultivation and dealings are rampant in and around Kaliachak. According to police, some 1500 acres of poppy fields have been destroyed so far.
