= Ancient Monuments Preservation Act, 1904 =

Act in British India

Imperial Legislative Council
- Territorial extent: India
- Assented to: 18 March 1904

Amended by
- Mysore Act 14 of 1955; Act 24 of 1958; Maha. Act 12 of 1961; Mysore Act 7 of 1961; Raj. Act 19 of 196
- Status: Amended

The Ancient Monuments Preservation Act, 1904 was passed on 18 March, 1904 by British India during the times of Lord Curzon. It is expedient to provide for the preservation of ancient monuments. It's for the exercise of control over traffic in antiquities and over excavation in certain places, and for the protection and acquisition in certain cases of ancient monuments and of objects of archaeological, historical or artistic interest. Act preserves and restores ancient Indian monuments by Archaeological Survey of India.

== Sections ==
1. Short title and extent.
2. Definitions.
3. Protected Monuments.

== Ancient Monuments ==
1. Acquisition of rights in or guardianship of an ancient monument.
2. Preservation of ancient monument by agreement.
3. Owners under disability or not in possession.
4. Enforcement of agreement.
5. Purchasers at certain sales and persons claiming through owner bound by instrument executed by owner.
6. Application of endowment to repair of an ancient monument.
7. Compulsory purchase of ancient monument.
8. Power of Central Government to control mining, etc., near ancient monument.
9. Maintenance of certain protected monuments.
10. Voluntary contributions.
11. Protection of place of worship from misuse, pollution or desecration.
12. Relinquishment of Government rights in a monument.
13. Right of access to certain protected monuments.
14. Penalties.

== Traffic in Antiquities ==
1. Power to Central Government to control traffic in antiquities.

== Protection of Sculptures, Carvings, Images, Bas-Reliefs, Inscriptions or like objects ==
1. Power to Central Government to control moving of sculptures, carvings or like objects.
2. Purchase of sculptures, carvings or like objects by the Government.

== Archaeological Excavation ==
1. Power of Central Government to notify areas as protected.
2. Power to enter upon and make excavations in a protected area.
3. Power of Central government to make rules regulating archaeological excavation in protected areas.
4. Power to acquire a protected area.

== General ==
1. Assessment of market value or compensation.
2. Jurisdiction.
3. Power to make rules.
4. Protection to public servants acting under Act.
