= Jaideep Patel =

Indian politician

Jaideep Patel (or Jaydeep Patel) is a medical doctor who runs a pathology lab in Naroda, Ahmedabad, Gujarat in India. He served as the Gujarat state general secretary for Vishwa Hindu Parishad (VHP), a Hindu nationalist organisation, during the 2002 Gujarat riots.

== Role in 2002 Gujarat riots ==
In the Godhra train burning incident on 27 February 2002, a train carrying pilgrims ("karsevaks") from a VHP-organized ceremony at Ayodhya was burnt by a Muslim mob, killing 59 people, including 25 women and 15 children. Jaideep Patel was present in Godhra to attend to the victims of the incident. He proudly told news reporters that he entered the burnt compartment even before the police did. He is believed to have had a role in the controversial decision taken by the Chief Minister Narendra Modi, Home Minister Gordhan Zadaphia and the District Magistrate, Javanti Ravi, to send the bodies of victims to Ahmedabad. The charred dead bodies were handed over to him by the executive magistrate of Godhra, allegedly at the behest of his senior officers, to be transported to Ahmedabad. They were transported in 5 trucks, along with a police escort, to Sola Civil Hospital in Ahmedabad, reaching there at 4 A.M. on 28 February.

Patel testified to the Supreme Court-appointed Special Investigation Team (SIT) that the BJP MLA's Maya Kodnani and Amit Shah visited the hospital the next morning, and the Hindu mobs gathered at the hospital "thrashed them" for the inability of the Government to protect the karsevaks. Subsequently, Kodnani and Patel were accused of being involved in the Naroda Gam and Naroda Patia massacres where 95 Muslims were murdered in a gruesome attack by Hindu mobs. The senior Police Officer PB Gondia, who registered First Information Reports (FIR) naming Kodnani and Patel was transferred out of his post, and the FIR mysteriously vanished. Investigating officers subsequently produced alibis for the two accused, claiming that they were at the Sola Civil Hospital at the time of the massacres.

Mobile phone records placing Kodnani and Patel at the scene of the riots were buried by the police. They were brought to light by the Nanavati Commission in 2004, and later investigated by the Special Investigation Team (SIT) of the Supreme Court of India in 2008. Kodnani and Patel ignored notices for deposition by the SIT, which declared them absconders in February 2009. They obtained an anticipatory bail from a sessions court, which was revoked by the Gujarat High Court on 27 March 2009, leading to their subsequent arrest, seven years after the carnage. Kodnani was implicated in both Naroda Patia and Naroda Gaam cases, whereas Patel was implicated in the Naroda Gaam case. Patel was however in constant mobile phone contact with the Bajrang Dal leader Babu Bajrangi, who was a leading participant in the Naroda Patia massacre, and Patel was kept informed of the death toll at regular intervals.
