= 2006 Vadodara riots =

Islamic riots in Gujarat, India

- Date: 1 May 2006 – 3 May 2006 (3 Days)
- Location: Vadodara district, Gujarat, India; 22.303176°N 73.210545°E
- Caused by: Caused by the municipal council's decision to remove the 200-year-old dargah

Casualties
- Deaths: 8
- Injuries: 42
- Location of riots in Gujarat, India

The 2006 Vadodara riots also known as the 2006 Dargah riots were religious riots that occurred on 1 May 2006 in the Vadodara district of Gujarat, India. The riots were started by Muslim mobs rampaging against the Municipal Council of India's decision to remove the dargah (shrine) of Syed Chishti Rashiduddin, a medieval Muslim Sufi saint. The riots resulted in eight Muslims being killed and forty-two injured, 16 of which were from police shooting.

== Background ==
The shrine was between two and three hundred years old. The dargah was first mentioned in a municipal survey carried out in 1912, when Vadodara was the princely state of Baroda ruled by Sayajirao Gaekwad III. The city Mayor, Sunil Solanki, had said that the council were removing illegal buildings as part of a road widening programme and that they had already removed 20 temples and three dargahs.

On 2 April, the Gujarat High Court looked into the incidents suo motu and decided that "encroachments on public roads cannot be tolerated", and that if needed, "anti-socials" who opposed these demolitions should be arrested before the demolition was carried out. The Supreme Court overturned the judgment on 4 April and ordered a temporary stay on demolition of illegal religious structures, due to the situation being volatile."

The commissioner for police, Deepak Swaroop, had requested caution on the issue. But Solanki insisted on the programme continuing as the shrine was in the way of development. It is reported that he said "If the police and the corporation will not do it, our boys in the Bajrang Dal will do it."

== Riots ==
On the first day it is estimated that eighteen people were injured and thirty-eight placed under arrest. The police have stated that they had at first used tear gas and batons in an attempt to control the crowd, but were left with no option other than to shoot. On 2 May there were incidents of violence between Muslims and Hindus in several areas. On 3 May the State Government requested that the federal government provide additional security personnel. A Muslim man had been burned to death in his car by a 1,500 strong crowd, and cases of arson had been reported. People were also evacuated out of the Ajabdi Mills area as a precaution.

Frontline wrote of the incident unlike the riots of 2002, this was only a skirmish. There were spontaneous clashes between two communities. There were casualties on both sides, of innocent people just like in 2002 but at much milder scale. The Independent People's Tribunal, an NGO has stated that the police had targeted Muslims during the incident.

The home minister for Gujarat, Amit Shah, stated that as a result of the incident paramilitary forces had been deployed and security increased in five of Gujarat's districts.

== See also ==
- 1969 Gujarat riots
- 1985 Gujarat riots
