= Jyotsna Yagnik =

Indian judge

- Education: L.L.B., L.L.M., Ph.D.
- Occupation: Judge
- Known for: Naroda Patiya massacre judgement
- Title: Principal Judge, City Civil and Sessions Courts, Ahmedabad, Gujarat, India

Jyotsna Yagnik is a retired Indian judge, legal scholar, and academic who served as the Principal Judge of the City Civil and Sessions Courts in Ahmedabad, Gujarat. She is most widely recognized for presiding over the high-profile 2012 Naroda Patiya massacre trial.

== Naroda Patiya massacre judgement ==
Yagnik delivered a 1900-page judgement in Naroda Patiya massacre case in 2012 in Gujarat and sentenced 32 people to life in prison including former Gujarat Minister and Bharatiya Janata Party leader Maya Kodnani. Kodnani was sentenced to 28 years in jail. Others sentenced included Bajrang Dal leader Babu Bajrangi.

== Views on death penalty ==
As a judge, Yagnik did not award the death penalty, stating that it undermines human dignity.

== Aftermath of the judgement ==
Yagnik received death threats after the verdict regarding the Patiya massacre. She was given Z-category security. A man was arrested for making threats.

== Judge in other notable cases ==
Yagnik awarded life sentence to 5 persons in a high-profile gang rape case in 2008. She has presided over other important trials involving rape or attempted rape of minor girls including one who was intellectually disabled.

== Academic career ==
Yagnik has worked as pro vice-chancellor (and dean of School of Law and Justice) of Adamas University, and as faculty at Gujarat Forensic Sciences University, Raksha Shakti University and Nirma University.
