= Naroda Assembly constituency =

Legislative Assembly constituency in Gujarat State, India

Coordinates: 23.07°N 72.65°E

Naroda
- Constituency No. 47 for the Gujarat Legislative Assembly

Constituency details
- Country: India
- Region: Western India
- State: Gujarat
- District: Ahmedabad
- Lok Sabha constituency: Ahmedabad East
- Established: 1967
- Total electors: 296,792
- Reservation: None

Member of Legislative Assembly
- 15th Gujarat Legislative Assembly
- Incumbent Kukrani Payal Manojkumar
- Party: Bharatiya Janata Party
- Elected year: 2022

Naroda is one of the 182 Legislative Assembly constituencies of Gujarat state in India. It is part of Ahmedabad district.

== List of segments ==
This assembly seat represents the following segments,

1. Ahmedabad City Taluka (Part) – Ahmedabad Municipal Corporation (Part) Ward No. – 23, 24, 27, Ahmedabad Cantonment (CB).

== Members of the Legislative Assembly ==
Election	Member	Party
1967	V. Tarachandani	Indian National Congress
1972	Vishindas Motiani	Indian National Congress
1975	Thawardas Khubchandani	Indian National Congress (O)
1980	Ramchand Tahalram	Indian National Congress (I)
1981 (By Poll)	Lekhraj Bachani	Bharatiya Janata Party
1985	Geetaben Daxini	Indian National Congress
1990	Gopaldas Bhojwani	Bharatiya Janata Party
1995	Gopaldas Bhojwani	Bharatiya Janata Party
1998	Mayaben Kodnani	Bharatiya Janata Party
2002	Mayaben Kodnani	Bharatiya Janata Party
2007	Mayaben Kodnani	Bharatiya Janata Party
2012	Nirmala Wadhwani	Bharatiya Janata Party
2017	Balram Thawani	Bharatiya Janata Party
2022	Dr. Payal Manojkumar Kukrani	Bharatiya Janata Party

== Election results ==
=== 2022 ===
Gujarat Assembly election, 2022: Naroda Assembly constituency
Party	Candidate	Votes	%	±%
BJP	Dr. Payal Manojkumar Kukrani	112767	71.49	
AAP	Omprakash Darogaprasad Tiwari	29254	18.54	
NCP	Meghraj Dodwani	8027	5.09	
Independent	Brijeshkumar Ujagarlal Sharma	1316	0.83	
Majority			52.95	
Turnout				
Registered electors		293,718		
BJP hold		Swing		

=== 2017 ===
Gujarat Legislative Assembly Election, 2017: Naroda
Party	Candidate	Votes	%	±%
BJP	Balram Thawani	108,168	65.53	−0.69
INC	Omprakash Darogaprasad Tiwari	48,026	29.09	+2.98
AIHCP	Amitbhai Mohanbhai Patel	1,976	1.20	+1.20
NCP	Nikulsinh Kamalsinh Tomar	990	0.60	+0.60
SS	Rahulsinh Kishorsinh Rajput	957	0.58	+0.58
NOTA	None of the Above	2,852	1.73	+1.73
Majority		60,142	36.44	−3.67
Turnout		1,65,077	62.45	−3.03
Registered electors		264,314		
BJP hold		Swing		

=== 2012 ===
Gujarat Legislative Assembly Election, 2012: Naroda
Party	Candidate	Votes	%	±%
BJP	Nirmalaben Sunilbhai Wadhwani	96,333	66.22	−9.18
INC	Bhavanbhai Surabhai Bharwad	37,981	26.11	+7.99
GPP	Pankajbhai Labhshankar Sonpal	4,451	3.06	+3.06
BSP	Satishkumar Mojiram Kateriya	2,502	1.72	+0.07
IND.	Ramchand Detaram Mohnani	1,640	1.13	+1.13
Majority		58,352	40.11	−17.17
Turnout		1,45,464	65.48	+9.69
BJP hold		Swing	-9.18	

=== 2007 ===
Gujarat Legislative Assembly Election, 2007: Naroda
Party	Candidate	Votes	%	±%
BJP	Dr. Maya Surendrakumar Kodnani	2,37,518	75.40	+0.73
INC	Dr. Parsottam Fagunmal Harwani	57,076	18.12	−3.13
BJSH	Hasmukhbhai Thakarshibhai Patel	6,354	2.02	+2.02
IND.	Dr. Maganbhai Motibhai Parekh	5,745	1.82	+1.82
BSP	Narendra Bhojumal Tahelramani	5,199	1.65	+0.87
Majority		1,80,442	57.28	+3.86
Turnout		3,14,994	55.79	+6.21
BJP hold		Swing	+0.73	

=== 2002 ===
Gujarat Legislative Assembly Election, 2002: Naroda
Party	Candidate	Votes	%	±%
BJP	Dr. Maya Surendrakumar Kodnani	1,55,286	74.67	+6.28
INC	Kanubhai Bhagvanbhai Kothiya	44,191	21.25	+3.11
IND.	Mukesh Ratansinh Rathod	3,124	1.50	+1.50
IND.	Harnishbhai Kantilal Amin	1,817	0.87	+0.87
BSP	Ranchhodbhai Aalabhai Solanki	1,613	0.78	+0.78
Majority		1,11,095	53.42	+9.39
Turnout		2,07,965	49.58	+2.43
BJP hold		Swing	+6.28	

=== 1998 ===
Gujarat Legislative Assembly Election, 1998: Naroda
Party	Candidate	Votes	%	±%
BJP	Dr. Maya Surendrakumar Kodnani	1,16,269	68.39	+12.20
INC	Dhirubhai Devrajbhai Patel	41,415	24.36	+1.17
AIRJP	Jagdishbhai Chimanlal Patel	11,629	6.84	+6.84
IND.	Radhakishan Uddhavdas Khanvani	349	0.21	+0.21
IND.	Rameshchandra Virjibhai Vachhani	339	0.20	+0.20
Majority		74,854	44.03	+11.03
Turnout		1,70,001	47.15	+0.28
BJP hold		Swing	+12.20	

== See also ==
- List of constituencies of the Gujarat Legislative Assembly
- Ahmedabad district
