= Violence against Muslims in India =

Since the Independence of India in 1947, there have been several instances of religious violence against Muslims in the country. These incidents often take the form of violent attacks on Muslims by Hindutva mobs, forming a pattern of sporadic sectarian violence between Hindu and Muslim communities. From 1954 to 1982, nearly 7,000 incidents occurred, resulting in the deaths of over 10,000 people.

The causes of violence against Muslims in the country are varied. The roots are thought to lie in Indian history, stemming from resentment towards the Muslim conquests in India during the Middle Ages, the divisive policies implemented by the colonial government during British rule, and the partition of the Indian subcontinent into a Muslim-majority Pakistan and an Indian state with a sizeable Muslim minority. Many scholars argue that anti-Muslim violence could also be politically motivated and part of an electoral strategy of mainstream right wing political parties associated with the Hindutva ideology, such as the Bharatiya Janata Party (BJP). Other scholars contend that the violence is not widespread but is instead confined to certain urban regions due to local socio-political conditions.

== History ==
The roots of anti-Muslim violence can be traced to several events in Indian history, such as the resentment towards the Muslim conquests in India during the Middle Ages, the divisive policies established by the British colonial government (particularly after the suppression of the Indian Rebellion of 1857, which saw Hindus and Muslims cooperate in revolt against the ruling East India Company), and the partition of India into a Muslim-majority Pakistan and a Hindu-majority India with a Muslim minority.

A major factor in the rise of anti-Muslim violence is the proliferation of the Hindutva, a Hindu nationalist ideology. The Rashtriya Swayamsevak Sangh (RSS) is an Indian far-right paramilitary organisation, which is the principal Hindutva entity in the country. The RSS is the founding and leading force behind the Sangh Parivar, a group of Hindutva organisations, which includes political parties, religious organisations, and student unions, among others. This is evident in the writings of Golwalkar, the second Sarsanghchalak (Chief) of the RSS, in regards to Nazi Germany, where he observed, "Race pride at its highest has been manifested here. Germany has also shown how well nigh impossible it is for Races and cultures, having differences going to the root, to be assimilated into one united whole, a good lesson for us in Hindusthan to learn and profit by." In the 1990s, the Bharatiya Janata Party (BJP) leader L. K. Advani led a national political-religious rally named the Ram Rath Yatra, which culminated in the demolition of the Babri Masjid by a Hindutva mob, based on claims that the mosque was supposedly situated on the site of the Ram Janmabhoomi, the birthplace of the Hindu deity Rama. Since then, Hindutva has become increasingly mainstream within Indian politics, coinciding with a rise in anti-Muslim violence. Scholars argue that anti-Muslim rhetoric, politics, and policies have proved electorally beneficial for Hindutva political parties and leaders, especially the BJP, and therefore can be said to be politically motivated.

=== Manifestation ===
Violence against Muslims in India usually manifests in the form of mob attacks by Hindus. These attacks are referred to as communal riots in the country, and are considered to be part of a pattern of sporadic sectarian violence between the majority Hindu and minority Muslim communities. Furthermore, this has been seen as a part of the global rise in Islamophobia throughout the 20th and 21st centuries. Most incidents have occurred in the northern and western states of India, whereas communal sentimentsin the south are less pronounced. Some of the largest killings of Muslims in India include the 1948 Hyderabad massacres, the 1969 Gujarat riots, the 1983 Nellie massacre, the 1984 Bhiwandi riot, the 1985 Gujarat riots, the 1989 Bhagalpur violence, the 1992–93 Bombay riots, the 2002 Gujarat violence, the 2013 Muzaffarnagar riots, among others.

These patterns of violence have been well-established since partition, with dozens of studies documenting instances of mass violence against minority groups. Overall, more than 10,000 people have been killed in Hindu-Muslim communal violence since 1950. According to official figures, there were 6,933 instances of communal violence between 1954 and 1982. Between 1968 and 1980, 1,598 Muslims and 530 Hindus were killed, in a total of 3,949 instances of mass violence. Beginning in the late 1980s and early 1990s, a consistent rise in incidents of mass violence, throughout north India, began.

Praveen Swami, an Indian journalist and author, believes that these acts of violence have "scarred India's post independence history." He also considers them to have hindered India's cause in Jammu and Kashmir, in regards to the Kashmir conflict.

In 2017, IndiaSpend reported that 84% of the victims of cow vigilante violence in India from 2010 to 2017 were Muslims, and almost 97% of these attacks were reported after May 2014, when Narendra Modi's BJP government first came to power.

== Causes and effects ==
Location of communal incidents, with given city names and years

Scholars have described incidents of anti-Muslim violence as politically motivated and organised, with many describing them as pogroms, or a form of state terrorism with "organised political massacres" rather than mere "riots". Others have argued that anti-Muslim violence is not as widespread as it appears, and is rather restricted to certain urban areas because of local socio-political conditions. There are many Indian cities where Muslims and Hindus live peacefully together, with almost no instances of sectarian violence.

=== Role of political parties ===
Many social scientists have argued that acts of anti-Muslim violence are institutionally supported, particularly by political parties and organisations connected to the Rashtriya Swayamsevak Sangh (RSS), a far-right Hindutva paramilitary organisation. In particular, scholars fault the Bharatiya Janata Party (BJP) and the Shiv Sena for complicity in these incidents of violence and of using violence against Muslims as part of a larger electoral strategy. For example, research by Raheel Dhattiwala and Michael Biggs has stated that the killings of Muslims are far higher in areas where the BJP faces stiff electoral opposition, in comparison to areas where the party is more cemented. Beginning in the late 1980s and early 1990s, northern India witnessed the beginning of a rise in anti-Muslim violence, with the BJP witnessing increased successes in local and state elections. Stanley Jeyaraja Tambiah, an American social anthropologist, concludes that the violence in Bhagalpur in 1989, Hashimpura in 1987, and Moradabad in 1980 were organised killings. According to Ram Puniyani, an Indian academic, the Shiv Sena was victorious in elections in Maharashtra due to the violence of the 1990s, and similarly the BJP was victorious in elections in Gujarat after the violence of 2002. Gyan Prakash, however, cautions that the BJP's actions in Gujarat do not equate to the entirety of India, and it remains to be seen if the Hindutva movement has been successful in the deployment of this strategy nationwide. In recent years, anti-Muslim violence in India has increased significantly due to the Hindutva ideology which envisages citizens with other religious beliefs to have second‐class status.

=== Economic and cultural factors ===
Hindu nationalists use the historical subjugation of India by Muslims as an excuse for violence. They feel that, since the Partition, Indian Muslims are allied to Pakistan and are possibly radicalised and, therefore, the Hindus must take defensive steps to avoid repeat of the past wrongs and reassert their pride. The higher fertility rate among Muslims has been a recurring theme in the Hindu Right's rhetoric. They claim that the higher birth rate among Muslims is part of a plan to turn the Hindus into a minority within their own country.

Another reason given for these outbreaks of violence is the upward mobility of lower castes communities. Anti-Muslim violence has become a substitute for class and caste tensions. Hindu nationalists, rather than deal with claims from the lower class, instead shift to viewing Muslims and Christians as not "fully Indian" due to their religion, and portray those who carry out attacks against them as "heroes" that "defend the majority" from who are considered to be "anti-nationals". Muslims are viewed as suspects and their loyalty to the state is regularly questioned. According to the scholar Omar Khalidi:

Anti-Muslim violence is planned and executed to render Muslims economically and socially crippled and, as a outcome of that economic and social backwardness, assimilating them into lower rungs of Hindu society.

Cultural nationalism has also been identified as a reason for instances of violence carried out by political parties such as the Shiv Sena, which initially claimed to speak for the people of Maharashtra but quickly turned their rhetoric to inciting violence against Muslims. The Shiv Sena was complicit in the violence in 1984 in the town of Bhiwandi, and again in the violence in Bombay in 1992 and 1993. Further violence has been incited by the party in 1971 and 1986. According to academic Sudipta Kaviraj, the Vishva Hindu Parishad (VHP) is still engaged in religious conflicts which began in medieval times.

Anti-Muslim violence creates a security risk for Hindus residing outside of India. Since the 1950s, there have been retaliatory attacks on Hindus in Pakistan and Bangladesh in response to anti-Muslim violence in India. After the 1992 violence in Bombay, Hindu temples were attacked in Britain and Thailand, as well as cities such as Dubai. This recurring violence has created a significant divide between the Muslim and Hindu communities.

Jamaat-e-Islami Hind has spoken out against these communal clashes, as it believes that the violence not only impacts Muslims, but India as a whole. They further believe the violence damages India's development prospects. In Gujarat, the Terrorist and Disruptive Activities (Prevention) Act (TADA) was utilised in incidents pertaining to communal violence in 1992 and 1993. The majority of those arrested under the act were Muslim. Conversely, TADA was not used after the violence carried out against Muslims during the Bombay riots.

=== Demographics ===
BJP politicians, as well as those of other parties, argue that demographics play an essential role in Indian elections. The BJP believes that the higher the number of Muslims within a constituency, the higher the chances of centrist parties to acquiesce to minority groups' requests, which lowers the chances of Muslims "building bridges" with their Hindu neighbours. As such, according to this argument "Muslim appeasement" is the root cause of communal violence. Susanne and Lloyd Rudolph argue that economic disparity is a reason for the aggression shown towards Muslims by Hindus. As India's economy developed due to globalisation and investment from overseas companies, the expectations of the Hindu population were not met in reality. Hindutva advocates then encouraged the perception of Muslims as the source of the troubles of the Hindus.

The actions of anti-Hindu and anti-India militant groups in Kashmir and Pakistan have reinforced anti-Muslim sentiments in the country, which has strengthened the Hindutva movement. Hindutva discourse portrays Muslims as traitors and state enemies, whose patriotism is questioned. Sumit Ganguly, a political scientist, argues that the rise in terrorism cannot solely be attributed to socioeconomic factors, but also to the violence perpetrated by Hindutva forces.

== Major incidents ==
=== 1964 Calcutta riots ===
In 1964, riots occurred in Calcutta, West Bengal, between Hindus and Muslims. The violence left over 100 people dead, with 438 people injured. Over 7,000 people were arrested. 70,000 Muslims fled their homes and 55,000 were provided protection by the Indian army. Muslims in Kolkata became more ghettoised than ever before in the aftermath. Furthermore, violence was also seen in rural West Bengal.

=== 1983 Nellie massacre ===
On 18 February 1983, around 1,600 to 2,000 Muslims of East Bengal origin, known as the Miya people, from various villages under the Nellie police station in Assam's Nagaon district, were killed by their tribal and lower caste Hindu village neighbours. The incident began in early morning, when groups of villagers burned down the homes of the victims. With no place to hide, the outnumbered victims rushed towards the direction of a Central Reserve Police Force (CRPF) camp, with the perpetrators pursuing and hacking to death those who fell back. From those that died, around 70% were women, 20% were elderly people, and 10% were men.

This massacre happened in the context of the Assam Movement, which demanded the deletion of foreigners' names from the electoral roll. The Congress-led Indian government decided to go ahead with the 1983 Assembly elections without revising the electoral roll, which the leaders of the movement decided to boycott with widespread support from the local populace. The Miya people decided to support the Congress party, in the hopes of ending the movement. The call for boycott triggered widespread violence, with different ethnic, religious, and linguistic groups clashing against each other. Muslim communities of Nellie, anticipating an attack, had reported the possibility of one to the police several times before the incident; and though police officers visited Muslim villages to assure their safety, no police personnel was deputed for their protection.

In the aftermath, both the Indian government and the movement leaders blamed each other for the responsibility for the massacre. The government instituted the Tewary Commission, to investigate the incident. Though the report has been finished, it has not been released to the public. The leaders of the Assam Movement boycotted the Tewary Commission, and supported a non-official judicially inquired commission instead, led by T. U. Mehta, a retired chief justice of a high court. Both the commissions are seen as biased and aligned to either the government or the movement leaders' perspective, and there exists no third-party report. After the incident, hundreds of cases were filed, and hundreds of charge sheets were submitted by the police. However, after the movement leaders came to power in Assam two years later, in 1985, all cases concerning the 1983 election were subsequently closed, and no one has been punished for the incident thereafter. Both the survivors and the perpetrators went back to their villages, though not in complete harmony.

=== 1969 to 1985 riots ===
During the 1969 Gujarat riots, it is estimated that 630 people lost their lives. The 1970 Bhiwandi Riots, which occurred between 7 and 8 May in the Maharashtrian towns of Bhiwandi, Jalgaon, and Mahad. There were large amounts of arson and vandalism of Muslim-owned properties. In 1980, in Moradabad, an estimated 2,500 people were killed due to religious sectarian violence. Local police were directly implicated in planning the instances of violence.

=== 1987 Hashimpura massacre ===
Communal riots between Hindus and Muslims occurred in Meerut, Uttar Pradesh, in 1987. During these riots 19 personnel of the Provincial Armed Constabulary (PAC) allegedly rounded up 42 Muslim youth from the Hashimpura locality of the city, and took them in truck to its outskirts, near Muradnagar Ghaziabad district, where they were subsequently shot and their bodies dumped in water canals. The bodies were found a few days later. In May 2000, 16 of the 19 accused surrendered, and were later released on bail, while 3 were already dead. In 2002, the trial of the case was transferred by the Supreme Court of India, from Ghaziabad to a Sessions Court at the Tis Hazari complex in Delhi. The case faced regular delays, becoming the oldest pending case in Delhi. On 21 March 2015, all 16 accused men were acquitted due to insufficient evidence. Reportedly, the court emphasised that the survivors could not recognise any of the accused PAC personnel. However, on 31 October 2018, the Delhi High Court convicted the 16 personnel of the PAC, who were then sentenced to life imprisonment, overturning the previous verdict.

=== 1989 Bhagalpur violence ===
In the year 1989, in Bhagalpur, Bihar, an estimated 1,000 people lost their lives in violent attacks, believed to be a result of the religious tensions raised over the Ayodhya dispute, and the processions carried out by the VHP, which were to be a "show of strength" and to serve as a warning to minority communities. Beginning on 24 October 1989, violent incidents occurred for over two months. The violence affected the Bhagalpur city as well as 250 villages around it. Over 1,000 people were killed, and another 50,000 were displaced as a result of the violence. It was considered the worst Hindu-Muslim violence in independent India at the time.

=== 1992–93 Bombay riots ===
The destruction of the Babri Mosque by a far-right Hindu mob directly led to the 1992–93 Bombay riots. According to an article published in The Hindu's Frontline magazine, titled Gory Winter, "officially, 900 people were killed in mob rioting and firing by the police, 2,036 injured and thousands internally displaced." BBC correspondent Toral Varia called the riots "a pre-planned pogrom", that had been in the making since 1990, and stated that the destruction of the mosque was "the final provocation".

Several scholars have likewise concluded that the riots were pre-planned, and that Hindu rioters had been given access to information about the locations of Muslim-owned homes and businesses from non-public sources. This violence is widely reported as having been orchestrated by the Shiv Sena, a Hindutva political party led by Bal Thackeray. A high-ranking member of the special branch, V. Deshmukh, gave evidence to the commission tasked with probing the riots. He said that the failures in intelligence and prevention had been due to political assurances that the mosque in Ayodhya would be protected, that the police were fully aware of the Shiv Sena's capabilities to commit acts of violence, and that the party had a history of inciting hate against minority communities.

=== 2002 Gujarat violence ===
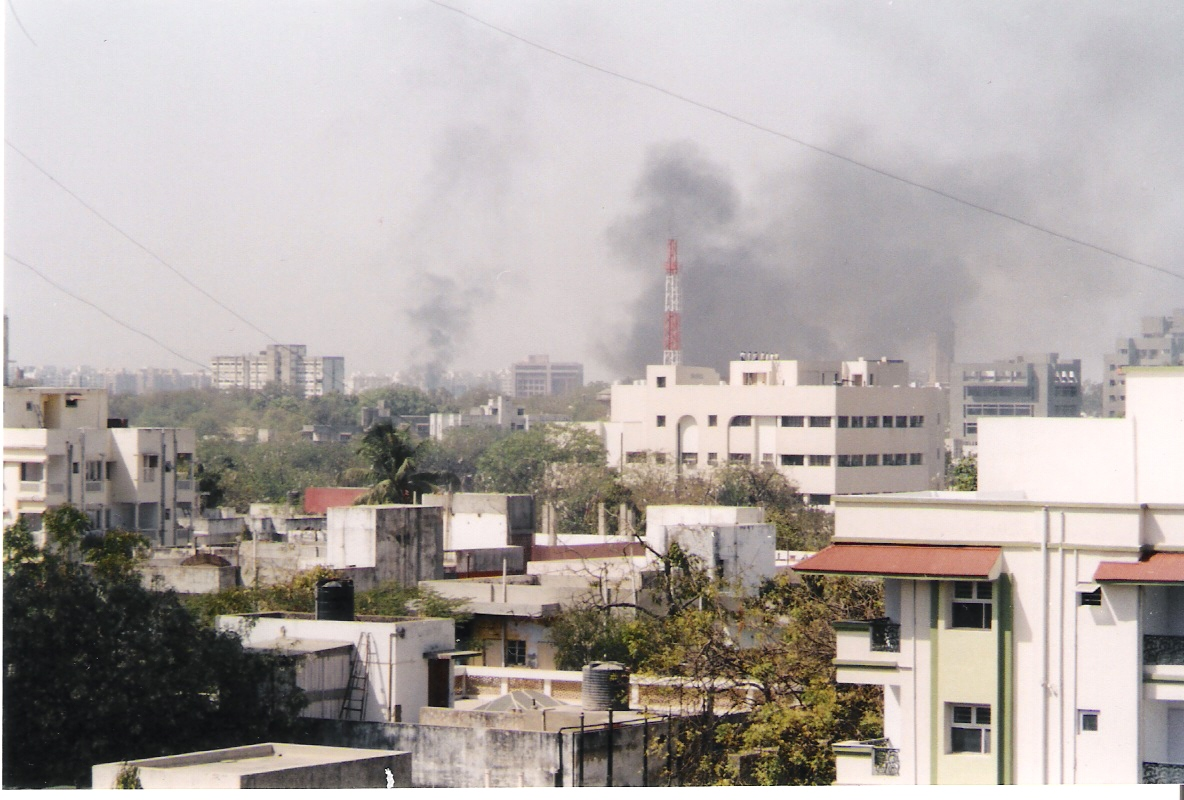
The skyline of Ahmedabad filled with smoke as buildings and shops are set on fire by rioting mobs

Since the partition, Muslim communities have been subject to, and engaged in, violence in Gujarat. In 2002, in an incident described as an act of "fascistic state terror", Hindu extremists carried out acts of violence against the minority Muslim population.

The beginning of the incident was the Godhra train burning, which was allegedly done by Muslims. During the anti-Muslim violence, young girls were sexually assaulted, burned, or hacked to death. These instances of violence were condoned by the ruling BJP, whose refusal to intervene led to the displacement of over 200,000 people. Death toll figures range from the official estimate of 254 Hindus and 790 to over 2,000 Muslims killed. Then Chief Minister Narendra Modi has also been accused of initiating and condoning the violence, as have the police and government officials who took part, as they had directed the rioters and gave them lists of Muslim-owned properties.

Politician Mallika Sarabhai, who had complained over state complicity in the violence, was harassed, intimidated, and falsely accused of human trafficking by the BJP. Three police officers were given punitive transfers by the BJP after they had successfully put down the rioting in their wards, so as not to interfere further in preventing the violence. According to Brass, the only conclusion from available evidence points to a methodical pogrom, which was carried out with "exceptional brutality and was highly coordinated".

In 2007, Tehelka magazine released "The Truth: Gujarat 2002", a report which implicated the state government in the violence, and claimed that what had been called a spontaneous act of revenge was, in reality, a "state-sanctioned pogrom". According to Human Rights Watch, the violence in Gujarat in 2002 was pre-planned, and the police and state government participated in the violence. In 2012, Modi was cleared of complicity in the violence by a Special Investigation Team appointed by the Supreme Court. The Muslim community is reported to have reacted with "anger and disbelief", and activist Teesta Setalvad has said the legal fight was not yet over, as they had the right to appeal. Human Rights Watch has reported on acts of exceptional heroism by Hindus, Dalits, and tribals, who tried to protect Muslims from the violence.

=== 2013 Muzaffarnagar riots ===
From August to September 2013, conflicts between the Hindus and Muslims occurred in the Muzaffarnagar district of Uttar Pradesh. These riots resulted in at least 62 deaths, including 42 Muslims and 20 Hindus. The riots further left over 200 injured and more than 50,000 displaced.

=== 2020 Delhi riots ===
The 2020 Delhi riots left 36 Muslims and 15 Hindus dead, with over 200 injured. They were triggered by protests against a citizenship law seen by many critics as anti-Muslim and part of prime minister Narendra Modi's Hindutva agenda.

According to Thomas Blom Hansen, a Stanford University professor, across India "a lot of the violence perpetrated against Muslims these days is actually perpetrated by subsidiaries of the Hindu nationalist movement". According to him, the police harassment of Muslims in Muslim neighbourhoods in the run-up to the Delhi riots is "very well-documented". According to Sumantra Bose, a London School of Economics professor, since Narendra Modi's reelection in May 2019, his government has "moved on to larger-scale, if still localised, state-sanctioned mob violence".

According to Ashutosh Varshney, the director of the Center for Contemporary South Asia at Brown University, "on the whole, the Delhi riots ... are now beginning to look like a pogrom, à la Gujarat 2002 and Delhi 1984". According to Subir Sinha, a senior lecturer at the SOAS University of London, the north and northeast areas of Delhi were a focus of "highly inflammatory speeches from top BJP ministers and politicians" in the run-up to the Delhi election. Sinha continues that "the pent-up anger of BJP supporters" who lost the election in Delhi, effectively took it out on "the Muslim residents of these relatively poor parts of the city".

== In media ==
- Fiza: In Search of Her Brother, an Indian Hindi film featuring Hrithik Roshan (as Amaan), Karishma Kapoor (as Fiza), and Jaya Bahchan (as Nishatbi), was released in 2000. Fiza's brother, Amaan, goes missing during the 1993 Bombay riots. In 1999, 6 years later, Fiza sets out to find her little brother.
- Parzania, an Indian English film directed by Rahul Dholakia and released in 2007, was inspired by a true story of a 10-year old Parsi boy who disappeared after the Gulbarg Society massacre on 28 February 2002 as part of the 2002 Gujarat riots. This film was not released in Gujarat due to fear of further riots, which sparked controversy.
- Final Solution, a documentary film directed by Rakesh Sharma, was released in 2002 about the 2002 Gujarat riots. The Central Board of Film Certification attempted to ban the film, but in 2004, chairman Anupam Kher, granted an uncut version to be screened.

== See also ==
- Anti-mosque campaigning in India
- Hindu terrorism
- Hindu–Islamic relations
- Hindutva
- Islam in India
- Persecution of Muslims
- Religious violence in India
- Terrorism in India
- Violence against Christians in India

== Bibliography ==
- Berglund, Henrik (2011). Galina Lindquist; Don Handelman (eds.). Religion, Politics, and Globalization: Anthropological Approaches. Berghahn. p. 105. ISBN 978-1845457716.
- Blom Hansen, Thomas (2001). Wages of Violence: Naming and Identity in Postcolonial Bombay. Princeton University Press. ISBN 978-0691088402.
- Brass, Paul R. (2003). The Production of Hindu-Muslim Violence in Contemporary India. University of Washington Press. ISBN 978-0295985060.
- Brass, Paul (26 March 2004). "The Gujarat Pogrom of 2002". Social Science Research Council. Archived from the original on 21 July 2013.
- Brekke, Torkel (2012). Chris Seiple; Dennis R. Hoover; Pauletta Otis (eds.). The Routledge Handbook of Religion and Security. Routledge. ISBN 978-0415667449.
- Campbell, John (2012). Chris Seiple; Dennis Hoover; Dennis R. Hoover; Pauletta Otis (eds.). The Routledge Handbook of Religion and Security. Routledge. ISBN 978-0415667449.
- Chandavarkar, Rajnayaran (3 September 2009). History, Culture and the Indian City (1st ed.). Cambridge University Press. ISBN 978-0521768719.
- Chatterji, Joya (2013). Meghna Guhathakurta; Willem van Schende (eds.). The Bangladesh Reader: History, Culture, Politics. Duke University Press. ISBN 978-0822353188.
- Chu, Henry (25 February 2007). "Film on an India pogrom boycotted". Los Angeles Times. Archived from the original on 20 November 2015.
- Cohen, Stephen P. (2013). Shooting for a Century: The India-Pakistan Conundrum. Brookings Institution Press. p. 66. ISBN 978-0815721864.
- Datta, Antara (2012). Refugees and Borders in South Asia: The Great Exodus of 1971. Routledge. p. 183. ISBN 978-0415524728.
- D'Costa, Bina (2010). Nationbuilding, Gender and War Crimes in South Asia. Routledge. ISBN 978-0415565660.
- Dhattiwala, Raheel; Biggs, Michael (December 2012). "The Political Logic of Ethnic Violence: The Anti-Muslim Pogrom in Gujarat, 2002". Politics & Society. 40 (4): 483–516. doi:10.1177/0032329212461125. S2CID 154681870.
- Eckhert, Julia (25 May 2005). Austin Sarat; Christian Boulanger (eds.). The Cultural Lives of Capital Punishment: Comparative Perspectives. Stanford University Press. ISBN 978-0804752343.
- Engineer, Asghar Ali (1991). Communal Riots in Post-independence India. Sangam. ISBN 978-0863111396.
- Engineer, Asghar Ali (December 2002). "Gujarat Riots in the Light of the History of Communal Violence". Economic and Political Weekly. 37 (50).
- Etzion, Amitai (2008). Security First: For a Muscular, Moral Foreign Policy. Yale University Press. ISBN 978-0300143072.
- Gangoli, Geetanjali (28 January 2007). Indian Feminisms: Law, Patriarchies and Violence in India. Ashgate. ISBN 978-0754646044.
- Ganguly, Rajat (2007). "Democracy and ethnic conflict". In Sumit Ganguly; Larry Diamond; Marc F. Plattner (eds.). The State of India's Democracy. The Johns Hopkins University Press. ISBN 978-0801887918.
- Ganguly, Sumit (2003). The Kashmir Question: Retrospect and Prospect. Routledge. ISBN 978-0714684390.
- Ghassem-Fachandi, Parvis (19 March 2012). Pogrom in Gujarat: Hindu Nationalism and Anti-Muslim Violence in India. Princeton University Press. p. 2. ISBN 978-0691151779.
- Ghosh, Partha S. (2004). Ranabir Samaddar (ed.). Peace Studies: An Introduction To the Concept, Scope, and Themes. SAGE. ISBN 978-0761996606.
- Gupta, Ravi (2013). "The changing landscape". In K. Moti Gokulsing; Wimal Dissanayake (eds.). Routledge Handbook of Indian Cinemas. Routledge. ISBN 978-0415677745.
- Hazarika, Sanjoy (26 February 1984). "Peace fragile in Assam a year after carnage". The New York Times. Archived from the original on 7 February 2017.
- Hefner, Robert W. (2006). Robert W. Hefner; Muhammad Qasim Zaman (eds.). Schooling Islam: The Culture and Politics of Modern Muslim Education. Princeton University Press. ISBN 978-0691129334.
- Herman, Phyllis K. (2006). Kathryn M. Coughlin (ed.). Muslim Cultures Today: A Reference Guide. Greenwood. ISBN 978-0313323867.
- Holst, Arthur (30 August 2004). Smith, Merril D. (ed.). Encyclopedia of Rape. Westport, Conn.: Greenwood Press. ISBN 978-0-313-32687-5. LCCN 2004044213.
- Peter Malcolm Holt; Ann K. S. Lambton; Bernard Lewis, eds. (1977). The Cambridge History of Islam. Vol. 2A (New ed.). Cambridge University Press. ISBN 978-0521291378.
- Human Rights Watch (2003). "Compounding Injustice: The Government's Failure to Redress Massacres in Gujarat". Fédération internationale des droits de l'homme. p. 57. Archived from the original on 19 June 2015.
- Hussain, Monirul (1 February 2009). Sibaji Pratim Basu (ed.). The Fleeing People of South Asia: Selections from Refugee Watch. Anthem. p. 261. ISBN 978-8190583572.
- Jaffrelot, Christophe (1996). The Hindu Nationalist Movement and Indian Politics 1925–1990s: Strategies of Identity-Building, Implantation and Mobilisation. London: C. Hurst & Co. ISBN 9781850653011.
- Jaffrelot, Christophe (2011). Religion, Caste, and Politics in India. C Hurst & Co. ISBN 978-1849041386.
- Kaur, Raminder (5 February 2005). Performative Politics and the Cultures of Hinduism: Public Uses of Religion in Western India. Anthem. ISBN 978-1843311393.
- Kaviraj, Sudipta (2010). The Imaginary Institution of India: Politics and Ideas. Columbia University Press. ISBN 978-0231152235.
- Khalidi, Omar (28 December 2009). Shiping Hua (ed.). Islam and democratization in Asia. Cambria Press. ISBN 978-1604976328.
- Kimura, Makiko (2013). The Nellie Massacre of 1983: Agency of Rioters. Sage Publications India. ISBN 9788132111665.
- Kokrajhar; Dhubri (24 August 2012). "Killing for a homeland". The Economist Banyan blog. Archived from the original on 25 August 2012.
- Krishnan, Murali; Shams, Shamil (11 March 2012). "Modi's clearance in the Gujarat riots case angers Indian Muslims". Deutsche Welle. Archived from the original on 20 October 2014.
- Markovits, Claude. "India from 1900 to 1947". Mass Violence.Org. Archived from the original on 8 April 2008.
- Mazzarella, William (2013). Censorium: Cinema and the Open Edge of Mass Publicity. Duke University Press. ISBN 978-0822353881.
- Metcalf, Barbara (2006). Robert W. Hefner; Muhammad Qasim Zaman (eds.). Schooling Islam: The Culture and Politics of Modern Muslim Education. Princeton University Press. ISBN 978-0691129334.
- Metcalf, Barbara D. (2009). Barbara D. Metcalf (ed.). Islam in South Asia in Practice. Princeton University Press. ISBN 978-0691044200.
- Metcalf, Barbara (2013). Deana Heath; Chandana Mathur (eds.). Communalism and Globalization in South Asia and its Diaspora. Routledge. ISBN 978-0415857857.
- Murphy, Eamon (24 March 2011). Richard Jackson; Eamon Murphy; Scott Poynting (eds.). Contemporary State Terrorism: Theory and Practice. Routledge. ISBN 978-0415664479.
- Pandey, Gyanendra (1 November 2005). Routine violence: nations, fragments, histories. Stanford University Press. ISBN 978-0804752640.
- Pennington, Brian K. (2012). "Striking the Delicate Balance Teaching Violence and Hinduism". In Brian K. Pennington (ed.). Teaching Religion and Violence. Oxford University Press. ISBN 978-0195372427.
- Prakash, Gyan (15 February 2007). Anuradha Dingwaney Needham; Rajeswari Sunder Rajan (eds.). The Crisis of Secularism in India. Duke University Press. ISBN 978-0822338468.
- Price, Daniel E. (2012). Sacred Terror: How Faith Becomes Lethal. Praeger. ISBN 978-0313386381.
- Puniyan, Ram (2003). Communal Politics: Facts Versus Myths. Sage. ISBN 978-0761996675.
- Raman, Sita Anantha (8 June 2009). Women in India: a social and cultural history. Praeger. ISBN 978-0275982423.
- Riaz, Ali (2008). Faithful Education: Madrassahs in South Asia. Rutgers University Press. ISBN 978-0813543451.
- Riddick, John F. (2006). The History of British India: A Chronology. Praeger. ISBN 978-0313322808.
- Risam, Roopika (30 December 2010). John D. H. Downing (ed.). Encyclopedia of Social Movement Media. Sage. ISBN 978-0761926887.
- Saikia, Yasmin (2005). Fragmented Memories: Struggling to be Tai-Ahom in India. Duke University Press. ISBN 978-0822333739.
- Sarkur, Tanika (2007). Taisha Abraham (ed.). Women and the Politics of Violence. Har Anand. ISBN 978-8124108475.
- Sikand, Yoginder (2004). Muslims in India Since 1947: Islamic Perspectives on Inter-Faith Relations. Routledge. ISBN 978-0415314862.
- Sikand, Yoginder (2006). Ibrahim Abu-Rabi' (ed.). The Blackwell Companion to Contemporary Islamic Thought. Wiley-Blackwell. ISBN 978-1405121743.
- Singh, Ujjwal Kumar (2012). Victor V. Ramraj; Michael Hor; Kent Roach (eds.). Global Anti-Terrorism Law and Policy (2nd ed.). Cambridge University Press. p. 427. ISBN 9781107014671.
- Smith, Glenn (2005). Asvi Warman Adam; Dewi Fortuna Anwar (eds.). Violent Internal Conflicts in Asia Pacific: Histories, Political Economies, and Policies. Yayasan Obor. ISBN 9789794615140.
- Swami, Praveen (19 October 2006). India, Pakistan and the Secret Jihad: The Covert War in Kashmir, 1947–2004. Routledge. ISBN 978-0415404594.
- Tambiah, Stanely J. (1997). Leveling Crowds: EthnoNationalist Conflicts and Collective Violence in South Asia. University of California Press. ISBN 978-0520206427.
- Tilly, Charles (2006). Regimes and Repertoires. University of Chicago Press. ISBN 978-0226803500.
- "State pogroms glossed over". The Times of India. 31 December 2005.
- Townson, Duncan, ed. (1999). "Indian communal massacres (1946–1947)". Blackwell Reference. doi:10.1111/b.9780631209379.1999.x. ISBN 9780631209379.
- Varia, Toral (2 September 2007). "Mumbai riots a planned, perfected pogrom?". CNN-IBN.
- Varshney, Ashutosh (2003). Ethnic Conflict and Civic Life: Hindus and Muslims in India (2nd Revised ed.). Yale University Press. ISBN 978-0300100136.
- Varshney, Ashutosh (26 March 2004). "Understanding Gujarat Violence". Social Science Research Council. Archived from the original on 21 July 2013.
- Vickery, Jacqueline (30 December 2010). John D. H. Downing (ed.). Encyclopedia of Social Movement Media. Sage. ISBN 978-0761926887.
- Weigl, Constanze (2012). Reproductive Health Behaviour and Decision-making of Muslim Women: An Ethnographic Study in a Low-income Community in Urban North India. Lit Verlag. ISBN 978-3643107701.
- Wilkinson, Steven I. (2006). Votes and Violence: Electoral Competition and Ethnic Riots in India. Cambridge University Press. ISBN 978-0521536059.
