= Balram Thawani =

Indian politician

Balram Khubchand Thawani (born 1965) is an Indian politician from Gujarat. He is a former member of the Gujarat Legislative Assembly from the Naroda Assembly constituency in Ahmedabad district representing the Bharatiya Janata Party in 2017.

== Early life ==
Thawani is from Naroda, Ahmedabad district, Gujarat. He is the son of Khubchand Thawani. He studied till Class 10 at Adarsh High School and passed the SSC examination in 1982. He is a cloth merchant and declared assets worth Rs.69 lakhs in his affidavit to the Election Commission of India.

== Career ==
Thawani won the Naroda Assembly constituency in the 2017 Gujarat Legislative Assembly election representing the Bharatiya Janata Party. He polled 1,08,168 votes and defeated his nearest rival, Tiwari Omprakash Darogaprasad of the Indian National Congress, by 60,142 votes.
