= 1969 Gujarat riots =

Indian sectarian violence

Coordinates: 23°13′N 72°41′E

- Part of Religious violence in India
- Location of Gujarat in India
- Date: September–October 1969
- Location: Gujarat, India
- Methods: Killing, Arson, Looting

Parties
Hindus	Muslims	Others / Unidentified

Casualties and losses
24 killed, 482 injured	430 killed, 592 injured	58 killed, 10 injured

The 1969 Gujarat riots involved communal violence between Hindus and Muslims during September–October 1969, in Gujarat, India. The violence was Gujarat's first major riot that involved massacre, arson, and looting on a large scale. It was the most deadly Hindu-Muslim violence since the partition of India in 1947, and remained so until the 1989 Bhagalpur violence.

According to the official figures, 660 people were killed, 1074 people were injured, and over 48,000 lost their property. Unofficial reports claim as high as 2000 deaths. The Muslim community suffered the majority of the losses. Out of the 512 deaths reported in the police complaints, 430 were Muslims. Property worth 42 million rupees was destroyed during the riots, with Muslims losing 32 million worth of property. A distinctive feature of the violence was the attack on Muslim chawls by their Dalit Hindu neighbours who had maintained peaceful relations with them until this point.

The riots happened during the chief ministership of the Indian National Congress leader Hitendra Desai. The Justice Reddy Commission set up by his government blamed the Hindu nationalist organizations for the violence. Various writers trace the causes of the riots to a mix of socioeconomic and political factors. The riots started in Ahmedabad, and then spread elsewhere, notably Vadodara, Mehsana, Nadiad, Anand, and Gondal. By 26 September, the violence had been brought under control, however some more violent incidents happened during 18–28 October 1969.

== Background ==
The Hindu-Muslim tension increased considerably in Gujarat during the 1960s. Between 1961 and 1971, there were 685 incidents of communal violence in the urban areas of Gujarat (plus, another 114 in the rural areas). Out of the 685 incidents, 578 incidents happened in 1969 alone.

Although Ahmedabad had been divided along the caste and religious lines, it was not a communally sensitive area until the 1960s. In the 1960s, the city's textile mills attracted a large number of migrants from other parts of the state. During 1961–71, the city's population grew by nearly 38%, resulting in the rapid growth of slums in the eastern part of the city. However, the mid-1960s onwards, a number of under-qualified mill workers in Ahmedabad became unemployed, as the jobs went to the small units of Surat. During the 1960s, seven large mills in Ahmedabad shut down, and around 17,000 workers lost their jobs. The Hindus were over-represented among these workers, compared to the Muslims. The Dalit Hindu workers faced a greater sense of insecurity, as the local Muslim workers were said to be more skilled in the weaving. Several violent clashes involving the textile workers took place in the slums of the city, mainly between the Hindu Dalits and the Muslims.

The changing socioeconomic factors also impacted the political situation in the city. The Indian National Congress had been fragmenting, leading to tensions between its factions: the Congress eventually split into Congress (O) and Congress (I) in 1969. At the same time, the Hindu nationalist organization Rashtriya Swayamsevak Sangh (RSS) had established local strongholds in the eastern parts of the city.

Several incidents led to increase in tensions between the two communities in Ahmedabad. During a three-day rally held in Maninagar during 27–28 December 1968, the RSS supremo M. S. Golwalkar pleaded for a Hindu Rashtra ("Hindu nation"). On the Muslim side, provocative speeches were made at the conference of Jamiat Ulema-e-Hind in June 1969. In addition, Muslims around Gujarat took part in protestations against attacks on the Al-Aqsa mosque in Jerusalem, but many Hindus took slogans of Muslim solidarity as anti-national, raising tensions in the state. During these protests in Ahmedabad, allegations that slogans like "Pakistan Zindabad" were shouted, emerged.

On the evening of 3 March 1969, a Hindu police officer moved a handcart that was obstructing traffic near the Kalupur Tower. A copy of the Koran placed on the handcart fell on the ground, resulting in a demand for an apology by a small Muslim crowd standing nearby. The crowd soon grew, and twelve policemen were injured in the subsequent violent protests. In the end, the police officer was twice asked to apologize to the Muslims in the area. On 31 August, the Muslims of the city held a large demonstration to protest the burning of the Al-Aqsa Mosque in Jerusalem. On 4 September, a Muslim sub-inspector, while dispersing a Ramlila festive crowd, hit a table. As a result, the Hindu text Ramayana and an Aarti thali (plate) fell. The Hindus alleged that the police officer also kicked the sacred book. There were demands for dismissal of the officer, but the government agreed to conduct an inquiry into his behaviour. This incident, and the disparate treatment between events led to protests by Hindus, and the formation of the Hindu Dharma Raksha Samiti by the RSS leaders. The Hindu Dharma Raksha Samiti ("Hindu Religion Protection Committee") organized protests in which anti-Muslim slogans were raised. The Bharatiya Jana Sangh leader Balraj Madhok visited the city and made fiery speeches on 14 and 15 September. Another incident included an alleged assault on some Muslim maulvis, who were trying to construct a mosque in the Odhav village near Ahmedabad.

== September violence ==
On 18 September 1969, a Muslim crowd had gathered in the Jamalpur area of Ahmedabad to celebrate the local Urs festival at the tomb of a Sufi saint (Bukhari Saheb's Chilla). When the sadhus (Hindu holy men) of the nearby Jagannath temple tried to bring their cows back to the temple compound through the crowded streets, some Muslim women were injured. The cows also allegedly damaged some carts on which the Muslims were selling goods. This led to violence in which some Muslim youths attacked and injured the sadhus, and damaged the temple windows. Sevadasji, the mahant (priest) of the Hindu temple, went on a protest fast, which he gave up after a 15-member Muslim delegation led by A.M. Peerzada met him and apologized.

However, subsequently, a dargah (tomb shrine) near the temple was damaged by some Hindus. A large number of Muslims protestors gathered in the area. On the afternoon of 19 September, a crowd of 2500-3000 Muslims attacked the temple again. Following this, the rumours spread and the violence escalated, resulting in several incidents of arson, murders and attacks on the places of worship around the area. The Muslims in the eastern areas of the city and its suburbs started fleeing their homes for safer areas. Several trains carrying them were stopped and attacked. A curfew was imposed on the evening of 19 September, and on the next day, the army was called in to control the violence.

During 19–24 September 514 people were killed. This period also saw damage to 6,123 houses and shops, mainly by Hindus. In the morning of 19 September, different newspapers gave different accounts to their readers, causing confusion, and during the afternoon, provocative unsigned handbills were circulated, giving exaggerated accounts of the violence at the temple. Appeals to peace by the government and Muslim leaders were only published the next day, but in the meanwhile, mob fury was growing. A curfew was instituted from 10pm to 7am in certain areas, leaving the rest of the city unprotected. In the afternoon of 20 September 1969, a young Muslim man, angry at the destruction of his property by Hindus, announced that he would take revenge. An angry Hindu mob beat him up and asked him to shout Jai Jagannath ("Hail Jagannath"). The Muslim man said he would rather die. The crowd then sprinkled petrol on him and burnt him to death. The municipal corporation by-election scheduled for 22 September was postponed. The first curfew relaxation on the next day resulted in 40 deaths within the first three hours. During the peak of the riots, women were raped, stripped naked, and babies were beaten to death. Four separate trains full of escaping Muslims were stopped, with passengers being pulled out and killed.

By 23 September, Ahmedabad was brought in control of the army, but scattered incidences of violence continued after. Over 15,000 people were displaced, 3,969 dwellings were burned, and 2,317 more were destroyed by other means. Prior to the 23rd, police response to the violence was lackluster. The curfew was imposed by local government, but not implemented by the police. In addition, despite a shoot to kill order, police only brought batons, allowing Hindu rioters to further commit violence for several days. Furthermore, police officers were accused of taking part in the violence, with over 39 Muslim sites of worship being destroyed near police stations, with Hindu sites of worship remaining untouched.

According to the Justice Reddy Commission set up by the Congress Government to investigate the riots, Hindu nationalist organizations like the RSS, Hindu Mahasabha and Jan Sangh were involved in the riots. There was evidence that the mob violence was planned. Voting rolls were used to target Muslim residences and shops, leaving Hindu, and Hindu-Muslim partnered shops alone. Fuel for arson was readily available in multiple spots, and some rioters had reportedly covered their faces with masks.

== Aftermath ==
The Justice Jaganmohan Reddy Commission of Enquiry was set up by the Government of Gujarat's Home Department. It published a report in 1971, questioning the police's role in the riots. It found around six instances of Muslim religious places adjoining police lines or police stations being attacked or damaged. The police defended themselves claiming these police stations did not have adequate strength since the forces were busy quelling the riots at other places. However, the commission refused to entertain this argument, since there was no report of damage to a Hindu place of worship near any police station. Overall, 37 mosques, 50 dargahs, 6 kabristans (Muslim graveyards) and 3 temples were destroyed.

Journalist Ajit Bhattacharjea accused the police of not taking any "firm action for the first three days", and stated that "this was not a matter of slackness but policy". An unnamed senior Congress leader told him that their government was reluctant to use force because it was afraid of losing power to Bharatiya Jana Sangh in the next elections in case it did so.

The members of the Bharatiya Jana Sangh called the violence a revenge for the massacre of Hindus by the Muslim League in 1946. On 26 September, a Hindu organisation called Sangram Samiti claimed that the Congress-led government had been appeasing the Muslims, and had been encouraging the "abolition of Hindu religion under the name of secularism". The Hindu organizations claimed that after the alleged desecration of the Koran in March, the Hindu police officer had to apologize twice, while "it took days for taking any steps when the Hindus were similarly insulted" after the alleged desecration of the Ramayana in September.

According to the author and social activist Achyut Yagnik, the 1969 riots were a turning point in the Hindu-Muslim relations in Gujarat, and led to a drop in the tolerance levels, which was visible in the later riots of 1992-93 and 2002. After the 1969 riots, the state saw increasing Muslim ghettoisation. The use of weapons in settling disputes rose markedly.

== See also ==
- Religious violence in India
- 1985 Gujarat riots
- 2002 Gujarat riots
- 2006 Gujarat riots
- Naroda Patiya massacre
