= Babu Bajrangi =

Bajrang Dal leader convicted for massacre of Muslims during the 2002 Gujarat riots

- Born: Babubhai Patel
- Occupation: Politician
- Organization: Bajrang Dal
- Criminal charge: Guilty of masterminding the Naroda Patiya massacre which killed 97 Muslims
- Penalty: Life imprisonment

Babubhai Patel, known by his alias Babu Bajrangi, is a convicted murderer and the former leader of the Gujarat-wing of Bajrang Dal, . He was a central figure during the 2002 Gujarat violence. He was sentenced to life imprisonment by a special court for his role in masterminding the Naroda Patiya massacre in which 97 Muslims were murdered including 36 women, 26 men and 35 children. The Supreme Court of India granted him bail on medical grounds in March 2019. He was acquitted of any role in the separate Nardoa Gam massacre in 2023.

== Role in 2002 riots ==
In 2007, the Indian journal Tehelka published a hidden-camera interview with Bajrangi, in which Bajrangi speaks candidly of his role in the violence against Muslims in the Naroda Patiya massacre, a particularly intense episode of brutality during the 2002 Gujarat riots:

We didn't spare a single Muslim shop, we set everything on fire … we hacked, burned, set on fire … we believe in setting them on fire because these bastards don't want to be cremated, they're afraid of it … I have just one last wish … let me be sentenced to death … I don't care if I'm hanged ... just give me two days before my hanging and I will go and have a field day in Juhapura where seven or eight lakhs [seven or eight hundred thousand] of these people stay ... I will finish them off … let a few more of them die ... at least 25,000 to 50,000 should die.

In the video, Bajrangi claimed that after the killings, he called the home minister Gordhan Zadaphia and the VHP General Secretary Jaideep Patel, and told them about the killings. After a few hours, an FIR was lodged against him, and the police commissioner issued orders to shoot him at sight. He was later arrested, and released on bail. He was out on bail at the time of the Tehelka interview. He also claimed Narendra Modi changed judges three times to ensure that he was released from jail, as the first two judges wanted to sentence Bajrangi to hanging for his heinous crimes.

In 2012, he was convicted in the Naroda Patiya massacre case along with Maya Kodnani and thirty other accused. All thirty-two of the accused were found guilty of murder, attempt to murder, conspiracy, spreading enmity and communal hatred and unlawful assembly.

On 31 August 2012, Bajrangi was sentenced to life imprisonment. However, he continues to be out of jail on bail. As of 2016, Bajrangi had been granted temporary bail 14 times on the pretext of his wife's and his own poor health. After claiming to have developed partial blindness and deafness, Bajrangi was given an attendant (bodyguard) in Sabarmati Central Jail. On 7 March 2019, the Supreme Court of India also granted bail to Bajrangi, after the Gujarat government informed the Supreme Court, in reply to a bail plea that Bajrangi had filed last year, that he was in bad shape. The state told the court that Bajrangi had allegedly suffered complete vision loss, besides various other ailments.

The Supreme Court in June 2022 disallowed the use of the Tehelka tapes in any legal proceedings pertaining to the 2002 Gujarat riots, stating that they had no evidentiary value and extrajudicial confessions were against the law, further adding that the transcripts of the confessions were not supported by the evidence available with the SIT investigating the riots. In April 2023, Bajrangi was acquitted along with all of the 66 other accused in the separate Naroda Gam massacre by a trial court. The SIT stated that it would challenge the acquittals.

== Other activities ==
Babu Bajrangi also runs a trust called Navchetan trust, which as per his claims saves the girls who run away from home and marry outside their community. In a report of the Frontline magazine it was claimed that his organisation used intimidation and violence to forcibly end the marriages done outside the community. As per this report and his claims he had prevented more than 700 girls from such inter-caste marriages.

== In popular culture ==
- L2: Empuraan is a 2025 Malayalam movie which is loosely based on the 2002 riots. One of the antagonistic characters in the film is named "Baba Bajrangi", which some viewers have interpreted as an allusion to Bajrang Dal leader Babu Bajrangi, a convicted figure involved in the 2002 Gujarat riots who was sentenced to life imprisonment for masterminding the Naroda Patiya massacre. Following criticism, the film was later edited with 24 cuts and the antagonist's name was changed to Baldev.
