= The Truth: Gujarat 2002 =

Report on the 2002 Gujarat riots

The Truth: Gujarat 2002 (also called Operation Kalank) was an investigative report on the 2002 Gujarat riots published by India's Tehelka news magazine in its 7 November 2007 issue. The video footage was screened by the news channel Aaj Tak. The report, based on a six-month-long investigation and involving video sting operations, stated that the violence was made possible by the support of the state police and the then Chief Minister of Gujarat Narendra Modi for the perpetrators. The report and the reactions to it were widely covered in Indian and international media. The recordings were authenticated by India's Central Bureau of Investigation on 10 May 2009.

== Contents ==
A November 2007 report by the investigative news magazine Tehelka used a video sting operation to record a number of Sangh Parivar activists describing the riots from their perspective. Taking over six months, the reporter pretended to be an author interested in writing a book with a Hindutva point of view and interviewed the key accused. The report's table of content reads:

1. "First-hand accounts from the men who plotted and executed the genocide in Ahmedabad, Vadodara and Sabarkantha. Mayhem was meticulously planned and carried out by Vishva Hindu Parishad (VHP) and Bajrang Dal cadres across Muslim localities."
2. "The VHP and the Bajrang Dal manufactured and distributed lethal weapons across the state, often with the connivance of the police."
3. "Shocking accounts of how the guardians of the law colluded with the outlaws to make Gujarat’s horror even worse."
4. "Key Bharatiya Janata Party, Rashtriya Swayamsevak Sangh, VHP and Bajrang Dal activists speak openly of how Narendra Modi blessed the anti-Muslim pogrom."
5. "How public prosecutors ran with the hare and hunted with the hound, keeping their sympathies strictly for the accused. Government Counsel Arvind Pandya on how he hopes to subvert justice by manipulating the Nanavati-Shah Commission, set up to ascertain the truth."
6. "The truth behind Naroda Patiya, the grisliest massacre of 2002. Ahmedabad police’s collusion in the pogrom and its cover-up. Gory details of how former Congress MP Ehsan Jafri was hacked limb by limb at Gulbarg Society, in the words of those who did it."
7. "How spontaneous mob fury was shown as a premeditated conspiracy by the police who produced fake witnesses by bribing, coercion and torture."

There was substantial media interest in the report's description of Narendra Modi's role in the riots, based, for example, on video footage of a senior Bajrang Dal leader saying that at a public meeting on the day of the fire, "he had given us three days to do whatever we could. He said he would not give us time after that, he said this openly."

== Key people accused ==
The recordings show 14 main characters, with seven being accused in the main riot cases.

- Babu Bajrangi, Bajrang Dal leader
- Haresh Bhatt, Bharatiya Janata Party MLA and Bajrang Dal vice-president
- Suresh Richard (Naroda Patiya)
- Mangilal Jain (Gulbarg Society massacre)
- Prahlad Raju (Gulbarg Society massacre)
- Madan Chawal (Gulbarg Society massacre)
- Rajendra Vyas (Ahmedabad)
- Anil Patel (Sabarkantha)
- Dhawal Jayanti Patel

== Authenticity ==
Journalist B G Verghese described the report as "nothing short of a bombshell ... too well-documented to have been faked, as alleged. The effect was numbing."

There were two contradictions between the report and official records. Bajrangi and Richard both claimed that Modi visited Naroda Patiya a day after the violence to thank them. Official records showed that Modi did not make any such visit. India Today called their claims as "boastful lies". Also in the report, one VHP activist said a police superintendent promised to kill five Muslims and fulfilled it during the violence in the Dariapur area. Official records showed that the superintendent was not posted in the given location.

On 5 March 2008, the National Human Rights Commission of India directed the Central Bureau of Investigation to authenticate the video evidence uncovered by the Tehelka report. The CBI investigated the raw video footage and the equipment used to create it, and interviewed 14 of 18 "persons belonging to different Hindu outfits like VHP, Bajrang Dal, RSS and Gujarat Police [who] have been shown making revelations."

In October 2009, the CBI responded to the NHRC by issuing a report stating that "No Evidence of editing, alteration and tampering has been detected in the audio video recordings and their respective voice track recorded in the DVDs" and that "[Forensic Science Laboratory staff] have stated that on the basis of the result of the examination of the exhibits by them, it is clear that the recordings in the Sting Operation are authentic." After interviewing the subjects of the videos, the CBI reported, "Most of the above mentioned persons have stated that they were approached by some person / persons and that they have talked on the subject of Gujarat Riots which is the subject matter of the sting operation."

One video showed Babu Bajrangi saying that he and his men killed 91 Muslim men and women at Naroda Patiya. He further said that they raped a pregnant woman, slit open her womb, and threw her and the foetus into a fire. Bajrangi denied these charges. In 2010, the doctor who performed post mortem on the bodies at the time during the violence, testified before a special court. The court identified the deceased woman and found only evidence of 100 percent burns on her body during the post mortem.

== Journalistic ethics ==
The sting operation raised questions regarding journalistic ethics.

Arthur Dudney, a South Asia scholar at Columbia University wrote,

"From the perspective of squeaky-clean journalism, Khetan has broken two rules: Firstly, misrepresenting his identity as a journalist and secondly, making false promises about confidentiality."

Considering that the issue was implicating a sitting chief minister, Dudney seems to suggest that a method other than duplicity was probably not available:

"When a subject hesitated during an interview, Khetan said: 'I won't quote it anywhere ... For that matter ... I am not even going to quote you' and immediately after the reporter promised that, the interviewee made a chilling admission: Narendra Modi, the Chief Minister of Gujarat, had given the Hindu chauvinists three days to do whatever they wanted without government interference. Obviously the fact that the sitting Chief Minister of a state participated in communal violence is a matter that the public must know about, but I can see no way that the story would have come out had Khetan not bent the rules."

== Partisan criticism ==
The sting operation led to partisan criticism, both from Bharatiya Janata Party, as well as the Congress. Political activist Arundhati Roy described the range of critiques: "The overwhelming public reaction to the sting was not outrage, but suspicion about its timing. Most people believed that the éxposé would help Modi win the elections again. Some even believed, quite outlandishly, that he had engineered the sting. He did win the elections."

=== Anti-BJP bias allegations ===
Indian journalist and Member of Parliament associated with the Bharatiya Janata Party, Chandan Mitra, described the timing of the report's release as being so transparently pegged to the Gujarat assembly polls that even breast-beating secular fundamentalists found it hard to defend. It was pointed out that the report was released only a month before the assembly elections of Gujarat, and some claimed the sting was only meant to bring the downfall of the Narendra Modi government. Balasaheb Thackeray, the head of the Shiv Sena party termed the report a political conspiracy to defame the Hindus by the so-called secularists. It was pointed out the Modi did not visit Naroda Patiya as the Tehelka report claimed, and that Aaj Tak coverage mixed Tehelka material with material from the movie Parzania, which Arvind Lavakare claimed was used to sensationalize the reports on the Tehelka findings. The Bharatiya Janata Party claimed that Tehelka never conducted any sting against the Indian National Congress and alleged that the Congress-led government gave Tehelka tax exemptions.

=== Pro-BJP bias allegations ===
Alternatively, some claimed that Narendra Modi himself orchestrated the sting to gain support in the 2007 Gujarat elections. According to The Economist, some senior members of the Indian National Congress accused Tehelka of being in cahoots with the BJP as a tool to galvanize the Hindu vote. The bookies in Gujarat did respond to the report by shortening the odds on Modi, indicating heavy betting for Modi's win.

== Impact ==
The video reports were aired on Aaj Tak. The media widely covered the sensational segments from the report, but in some places, such as Ahmedabad, Gujarat, the government banned coverage. A group of editors criticized the Gujarat government for banning cable from airing the reports.

The reports were the impetus for further investigations. Mayawati, chief minister of Uttar Pradesh, called for new investigations as a direct result of the Tehelka report and the "fresh information" it had uncovered about the organized mass murder. A spokesperson from Congress called on Narendra Modi to resign.

Among the more reported segments of the report was video of Babu Bajrangi, the Bajrang Dal leader, describing the slaughter at Naroda Patiya and his reaction to it: "After killing them, I felt like Maharana Pratap." Maharana Pratap was a 16th-century ruler who was known for confronting the Mughals at the Battle of Haldighati. In the Tehelka transcript, Bajrangi is further quoted as saying, "(and we killed at will, turned the place into Haldighati)... And I am proud of it, if I get another chance, I will kill even more ..." After he was charged, Bajrangi denied his involvement and said, "I never killed even an ant in my life". He also told reporters, "I did not lead any mob in Naroda Patiya. The sting operation shows me saying that I took a sword and cut open a woman's womb. But I was trying to explain that the FIR filed against me accuses me of that act and that I deny it." He was later convicted by the riot court for 97 of those murdered at Naroda Patiya, which was one location among many in 2002 Gujarat riots.

Some of those investigated in the report were sentenced by court, including two leaders and 30 others. Bajrangi was sentenced to life. Parts of the report were used as evidence in court, and Ashish Khetan, the author of the report who was deposed in court, writes that the evidence was crucial for the conviction of the accused. The magazine called the convictions "vindication" for its 2007 report.
