= Juhapura =

- Neighbourhood
- Location in Ahmedabad, Gujarat, India Juhapura (Gujarat)
- Coordinates: 22.994348°N 72.528784°E
- Country: India
- State: Gujarat
- District: Ahmedabad

Government
  - Body: Ahmedabad Municipal Corporation

Languages
  - Official: Gujarati, Hindi, English
- Time zone: UTC+5:30 (IST)
- PIN: 380055
- Telephone code: 91-079
- Vehicle registration: GJ
- Lok Sabha constituency: Ahmedabad
- Civic agency: Ahmedabad Municipal Corporation
- Website: gujaratindia.com

Juhapura ([dʒuɦɑpuɾɑ]) is a neighbourhood in New West Zone of Ahmedabad, Gujarat, India near Sarkhej, along the National Highway 8A that goes towards Saurashtra and Kutch. The area was developed in 1973 for the people who were displaced because of the Sabarmati floods that year. It was founded then Prime Minister of India, Mrs. Indira Gandhi. The first housing society of the area was Sarni Kamdar.

The population of Juhapura is largely Muslim. Many Muslim professionals and businessmen also live in this area.

Juhapura was a small suburb with a small population until the mid-1980s, but after the communal riots of Gujarat from 1985 until 2002, many Muslims migrated from the Muslim and Hindu-dominated areas of Ahmedabad and the surrounding cities to Juhapura, causing a construction boom. Land and housing prices subsequently increased.

Juhapura is primarily residential but now also hosts a hospital, many schools, restaurants and dhabas and a food market. According to the 2011 census, Juhapura consist of a population of 500,000.

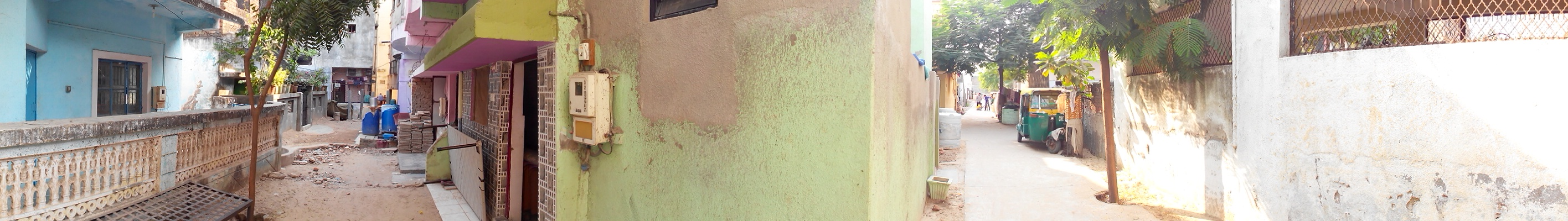
Panoramic view of Al-Saba Raw House (Bagh-E-Nishat Soc.) in Juhapura area
