= 1984 Maharashtra riots =

Violence against Muslims in India

- Location: Maharashtra, India
- Date: May 1984
- Target: Muslims
- Deaths: 146 to 278
- Injuries: 600 to 1,118
- Perpetrator: Shiv Sena

In May 1984, a month long series of religious violence against Muslims occurred in the Indian state of Maharashtra. The violence primarily occurred around Bhiwandi town. On 17 May 1984, riots broke out in industrial belt from Bombay, Thane, and Bhiwandi. Various accounts gave different numbers of people killed as from 146 to 278 and people left injured as ranging from 600 to 1,118.

== Events ==
The increasingly harsh anti-Muslim rhetoric and radical tactics of the Shiv Sena, a Hindutva political party, directly caused the riots. On 21 April 1984, at Chowpatty Beach in Bombay, Bal Thackeray delivered an anti-Muslim speech in which he repeatedly employed the offensive term landya and called Muslims "a cancer." He had allegedly made derogatory remarks about prophet Muhammad and the Quran. Under the leadership of local MLA Abdul Rahman Khan Yousuf Khan, the Muslim community at Parbhani garlanded Bal Thackeray's photos with dirty chappals (footware). In retaliation, Shiv Sena supporters equipped with gasoline bombs, daggers, spears and guns called for a bandh (general strike) for over a week. Muslims in the Bhiwandi area protested the bandh and marched on roads with green Islamic flags and rioting started.

Notable incident reported in the media was of handloom industrialist and president of the Bhiwandi Chamber of Commerce Ibrahim Ansari and his sons Aijaz and Javed, defending their farmhouse which was set on fire on 19 May. As attacks happened on the nearby hutments, numerous people had taken shelter in Ansari's farmhouse. Afterwards when the then Prime Minister Indira Gandhi visited the riot torn areas, Ansari met to convey his bitterness towards the government's failure.

== Aftermath and control ==
Troops of army were deployed to bring the situation under control. After a week, Major General Laxman Rawat who was the army commander for western India, informed of the subdued situation; however, the troops still remained deployed for precaution. Indira Gandhi, the then Prime Minister of India visited the affected areas of Mumbai and Bhiwandi to oversee the government actions.

In 1989, Saeed Akhtar Mirza’s film Salim Langde Pe Mat Ro utilized these riots as the backdrop of the storyline.
