= 1985 Gujarat riots =

1985 communal violence in Gujarat State

- Part of Religious violence in India
- Location of Gujarat state in India
- Date: February 1985 to August 1985
- Location: Cities of Gujarat State, India
- Methods: Killing, arson, looting.
- Led to 220–275 deaths, thousands of injuries and displaced tens of thousands.

The 1985 Gujarat riots began in February 1985 and lasted till August, in the Indian state of Gujarat. Most of the rioting occurred in the city of Ahmedabad; some other cities, including the state capital of Gandhinagar, were also affected. Between 220 and 275 people were killed in the violence, while several thousands of others were injured, and tens of thousands were displaced. The riots also caused widespread property damage.

In January 1985 the Gujarat government of Chief Minister Madhav Singh Solanki announced a change in its policy of reservation that increased the benefits to people from "backward" classes. Resentment over this policy among upper castes led to an agitation against it that began in February 1985. The agitation initially took the form of boycotts and protest marches, but quickly turned violent. Government property and buses were targeted by largely upper caste protesters. Beginning in March, communal violence also began to occur, as the city's Muslim minority were targeted. The state police frequently condoned, and in some cases participated in, the violence. The Indian Army was called in to patrol the city, and curfews were frequently declared. The violence died down in August 1986, after Solanki had resigned, and an agreement had been reached with the agitators. Ahmedabad's Muslims were the main victims; approximately 100 were killed, several hundreds badly injured, 2,500 of their houses destroyed, and 12,000 made homeless.

Historians and commentators have stated that the caste-related violence and the communal violence had a common origin. Upper castes felt threatened by the increasing social and economic opportunity available to lower castes, and by political alliances between underprivileged castes, Muslims, and adivasis. The rioting that was triggered by caste-related tensions thus turned into communal violence, and Muslims, who played no role in the reservation debate, were victimized. The religious violence that occurred also strengthened the Hindu nationalist movement: for example, the Bharatiya Janata Party's influence grew in Gujarat. According to the government commission that investigated the riots, members of the Akhil Bharatiya Vidyarthi Parishad and the Vishva Hindu Parishad, along with those of the BJP, also played a role in exacerbating the violence. Solanki's government was also described as using the violence for political gains.

== Background and motivation ==
In the election to the Gujarat Legislative Assembly held in 1980, the Indian National Congress government headed by Madhav Singh Solanki was returned to power. Since 1977, Solanki had built a successful political coalition based on support from Kshatriyas, traditionally known as a warrior caste, but by that time a disparate group of lower castes looking to improve their status; Harijans, or Dalits, historically known as untouchables; Adivasis, or indigenous tribes; and Muslims. The coalition was known by the moniker "KHAM".

The Solanki government created a "Backward Classes Commission", which in 1983 recommended that proportion of government jobs that were reserved for people from "backward" groups be increased from 10% to 28%, and that their caste identity be removed as a criterion for accessing this quota. To solidify its support among lower caste groups before statewide elections scheduled for March 1985, in January of that year the government implemented this increase; in addition to reserved jobs for Dalits, Adivasis, and "Socially and Economically Backward Classes", 18% of government positions were now set aside for "Other Backward Classes". However, contrary to the commission's recommendation, the government did not remove caste as a criterion for accessing this job quota.

Beginning in the 1970s, growing social mobility among underprivileged castes had led to growing insecurity among upper castes. This intensified after successive Congress governments made a concerted effort to build lower caste support, and the lower caste-based coalition Solanki put together challenged upper caste political dominance. Gujarat saw violent reactions by upper caste groups when the policy of reservation was introduced beginning in 1975; rioting occurred in 1975, and more severe riots in 1981, when more than fifty people, mostly members of underprivileged castes, had been killed. The agitation in 1981 began after reservations were implemented in post-graduate medical courses, and was begun by Brahmin, Bania, and Patidar students of a medical government college in Ahmedabad. Although the government acceded to their demands within a week, the agitation intensified, and led to widespread atrocities against Dalits in particular over more than three months.

These caste-based tensions persisted over the next few years, even though only a fraction of the quotas set aside for underprivileged castes were filled. In February 1985, resentment among upper castes about the changes to the reservation policy again led to rioting, as members of privileged castes began attacking government property. However, the riots rapidly turned into religious violence, as members of the Muslim minority were targeted. Gujarat had been the locus of India's worst communal violence since partition, during the 1969 Gujarat riots.

== Riots ==
=== February and March 1985 ===
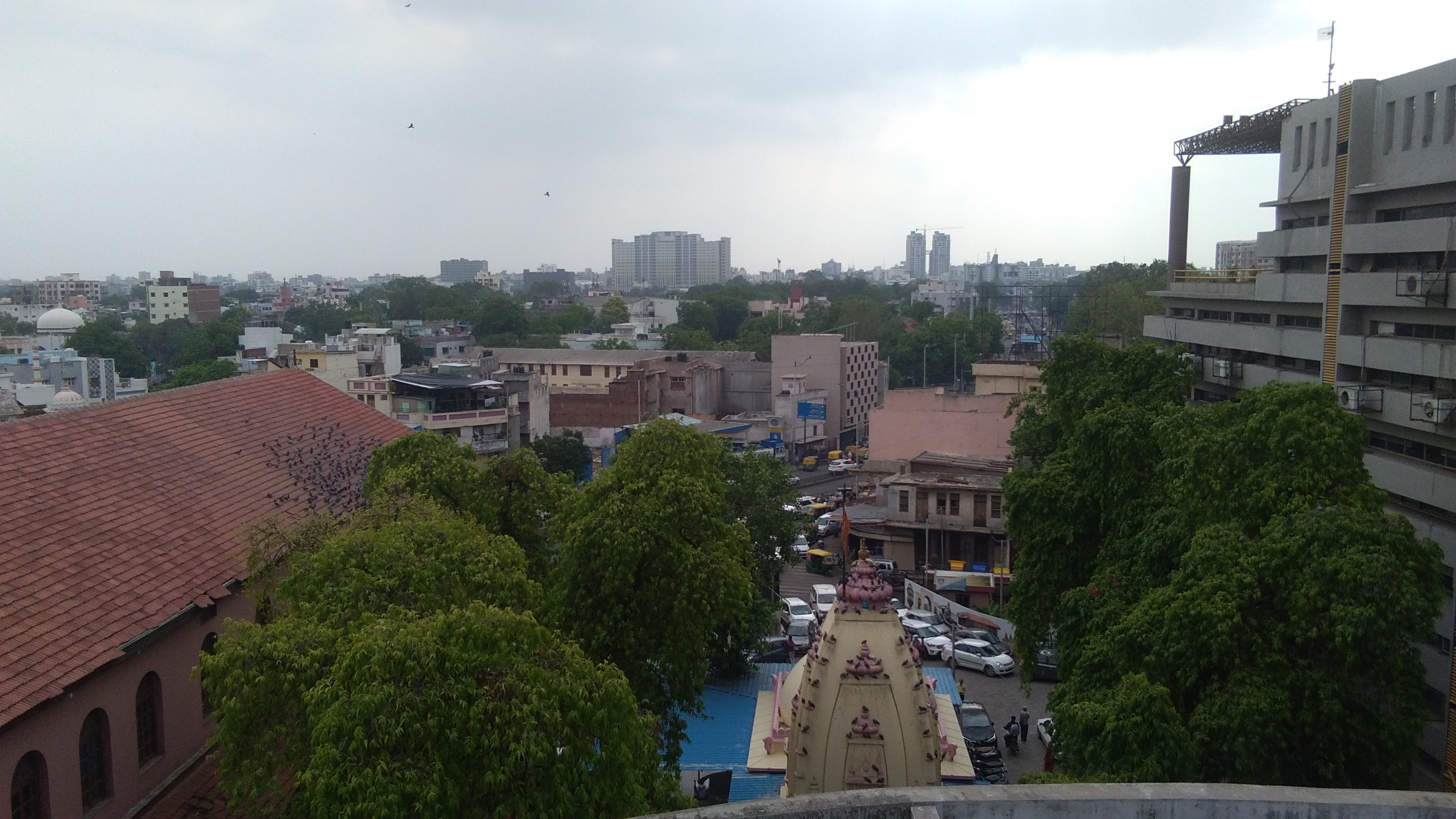
The old city of Ahmedabad, where the bandh of 25 was particularly effective.

Although the changes to the reservation policy were announced in January, no large-scale reactions occurred until mid-February. At that point, students of an engineering college in Ahmedabad decided to boycott their preliminary examinations, scheduled for 18 February, in protests. Students formed a committee, called the All-Gujarat Educational Reform Action Committee (AGERAC), and began an indefinite strike, boycotting all exams. In response, the government closed all schools and colleges. Students initially responded with boycotts and protest marches, but their agitation soon turned violent. Government and municipal property saw considerable damage as a result of arson and stone-pelting. The participants in the agitation were largely upper caste students, and the violence was initially confined to the western part of the city. AGERAC called for a bandh, or general strike, on 25 February. The strike was observed in some parts of the city but not others. It received the support of some lawyers and doctors organizations, as well as of student groups associated with the BJP. Most members of these groups, which had also supported the 1981 agitations, came from upper caste and upper-class backgrounds.

On 28 February, a passenger on a bus died when it was burned, but a lull in the violence followed during the first week of March. Elections to the Gujarat State Assembly were held as scheduled during this period, and the Congress, led by Solanki, won 149 of the 182 constituencies. Solanki formed a cabinet in which 14 of the 20 ministers were members of his KHAM caste coalition. After this, the student agitation resumed; more buses were attacked, along with private vehicles, and two buses were burned. Another statewide bandh was called for 18 March. In response, the government decided to postpone any changes to the reservation policy by a year, defer exams in schools and universities, and to publish the commission report that had recommended changes to the reservation policy. The agitators hardened their position, stating that they wanted an end to all reservation.

During the statewide bandh on 18 March, a number of violent incidents occurred, mostly targeting the police, buses, and government establishments; the police recorded more than fifty such incidents. That evening, the first religious or communal violence began in an area between a Hindu neighborhood and a Muslim neighborhood, where a Muslim boy was hit on the head by a thrown stone. Communal violence continued through the night in the adjacent neighborhoods, despite a curfew being decreed by the government at 10:30 PM. Hindu groups attacked Muslims in the Dariapur neighborhood; three people were slain, and eight others injured. The next day, the Indian army was summoned to restore order, but incidents of both religious and caste-based violence continued. On 23 March the Indian Prime Minister Rajiv Gandhi visited the city; the same day, three members of AGERAC were arrested for "abetting communal violence". The rioting abated soon after; the curfew was lifted, and by 2 April the army moved out.

=== April 1985 ===
Although the violence had briefly abated, the conflict over reservation continued in the month of April. Boycotts and rallies continued to occur; in Gujarat's capital of Gandhinagar, a thousand people were arrested when they tried to hold a rally. A movement emerged in support of reservation, demanding the implementation of new quotas. After an anti-reservation rally on 4 April was dispersed by the police using lathis, or truncheons, demonstrators stated that police had damaged houses and assaulted women, and demanded an investigation. Student organisations supporting and opposing reservation clashed at a statewide gathering. Incidents grew more violent as the month progressed, despite a curfew being reimposed on some parts of the city on 13 April.

The week between 16 and 23 April was described by a subsequent commission of inquiry as the "darkest period" of the 1985 violence. On 16 April the anti-reservation student group announced a "fill the jail" campaign, which led to more than a thousand students being arrested. Dalits and Patels clashed in Saraspur, a neighborhood in the eastern part of Ahmedabad, while police used "excessive force" against demonstrators in another part of the city. The army was called back into the city on 16 April, and would remain for the next three months. The students who had been arrested were released on 18 April, but the agitation continued. Despite the army's presence, a dozen people were killed in the first two days after its deployment, and looting and arson also continued to occur. Communal violence increased, as did violence on the part of the police. Complaints against the police became so frequent that a court barred them from entering some regions of the city; the army was tasked with patrolling them instead.

The situation deteriorated further four days later, when Head Constable Laxman Desai, was killed. In reaction, the police abandoned their post and "went on a rampage." Police attacked the premises of the Gujarat Samachar, a newspaper that had previously criticized the police violence, and burned their printing presses; the Western Times, an English-language newspaper housed in the same building, was also attacked. Communal violence increased, particularly in the eastern neighborhoods of the city, where residents stated that Hindus were attacking Muslim houses, with the support of the police. Several hundred houses were burned down, and many thousands of people, most of whom were Muslims, were displaced and were forced into a relief camp. Government records stated that 17 people were killed in the violence on 23 April alone; unofficial tallies put the number at 50, with 85 people injured. The extent of the violence led to protests against the role of the police, demands for an inquiry, and demands for the removal of the state government led by Solanki. On 29 April, the central government denied a demand by the opposition parties in Gujarat to dismiss Solanki's government.

=== May and June 1985 ===
The extent of violence again declined briefly in the last week of April and the first week of May. Demonstrations continued; a strike by government employees, initially as a protest against police atrocities but subsequently demanding an end to reservation in government jobs, was described as drawing the support of one million workers. The strike ended on 7 May after the employees withdrew their demand, and the government committed to publishing the report of a 1981 commission studying reservation. Clashes between Hindus and Muslims resumed on 8 May after a police sub-inspector, Mahendrasingh Rana, was shot dead in a Hindu neighborhood. Muslims were immediately blamed for the murder; over the next few days, 33 people were killed and several more were injured. Many of the casualties were victims of stabbings, particularly in the older parts of the town, and arson and stone-pelting also continued. Leaders of three political parties from the opposition, the BJP, the Janata Party, and the Lok Dal, went on a hunger strike demanding Solanki's removal. The government also faced pressure from those supporting the reservation, who threatened to "revolt" if the additional quotas of 18% were not enacted. Negotiations took place between the student protestors and the government, but failed to reach any agreement.

The Gujarat Chamber of Commerce called for another bandh on 5 June, citing the "government’s inability to maintain law and order". Widespread violence occurred on this day, including when a crowd of 200 women attempted to enforce the shutdown by stopping traffic. During the violence that occurred over the next few days, 34 people were killed. Notably, a family of eight Dabgars, a Hindu community, were burned alive, and the fire brigade that arrived to put out the blaze was prevented from doing so. Hindus in the neighborhood reacted by looting and burning stores owned by Muslims.

In response to these incidents, the Solanki government decided to delay the proposed changes to the reservation policy, and set up a judicial commission to investigate the violence that had occurred. The commission was led by a judge, V. S. Dave, and was referred to as the Dave commission. In doing so, the government conceded to most of the demands of the anti-reservation agitators; however, the agitation continued, with demands being made for the abolition of the existing 10% quota for "socially and economically backward classes" after 1988. A second notable incident of violence occurred soon after, when, on 20 June, a Hindu religious procession coincided with Muslim celebrations of Eid al-Fitr, despite a prior agreement between the organizers of the procession and the government. Despite the army's presence in the area, the two celebrations degenerated into violence. The subsequent day, thousands of Muslim women defied the curfew to protest the army's conduct during the violence, and demanding government action against the leaders of the procession.

=== July and August 1985 ===
Those protesting the reservation policy began demanding Solanki's immediate resignation in July. The violence at the end of June had led to conflict within the Congress party as well, with multiple allies of Solanki making public statements favoring his removal. Bombings and stabbings continued to occur, prompting members of the Indian government and of the Congress party from Delhi being sent to investigate. On 6 July, Solanki resigned under pressure from the Congress party's high command. He was replaced by Amarsinh Chaudhary, who became Gujarat's first Adivasi Chief Minister. The composition of the cabinet was shuffled to include some Patels and Banias, in an effort to balance its caste composition. Julius Ribeiro, the Director General of the Central Reserve Police Force with a reputation for bringing the underworld in Mumbai under control, was made head of the state's police.

The violence continued despite Solanki's dismissal. The strike by government employees continued, and grew in strength. The government eventually reached an understanding with the agitating students on 18 July, when it announced that the 18% increase in reservations would not be implemented, and a commission would be appointed to examine the existing 10% reservation for underprivileged castes after 1988. The army was withdrawn from the city on 17 July, but during and immediately after its withdrawal further violence occurred. Seven people were killed, five of them in police firing, on 18 July, and eight more on 22 July. During the period of transition, 60 people were killed, and 138 reported injured. Most of the violence during this period was communal. The curfew ended at the beginning of August. The government reached an agreement with striking employees in the middle of August, after which the strike was called off and schools reopened.

== Aftermath and analysis ==
=== Casualties and further violence ===
The number of people killed in the riots of 1985 has been estimated at 220, and 275. The city police recorded 662 "incidents and offences" related to caste-based violence, and 743 related to communal violence. The property damage was approximately equal to 2200 crore at the time ($1.75 billion). The Muslim community of the city were the main victims of the riots; approximately 100 were killed, several hundreds badly injured, 2,500 of their houses destroyed, and 12,000 made homeless. According to scholar Ornit Shani, the commission of inquiry appointed to look into the riots reported a picture of "uncontrolled rage, destruction and at times the utter collapse of the rule of law and social order" both in the city of Ahmedabad and in other parts of the state.

Communal violence broke out again in Ahmedabad in 1986. These riots were also triggered by a Hindu religious procession on 9 July. A Hindu organisation called for a bandh on 12 July, citing Muslim attacks during the procession, although responsibility for those attacks was not determined. The bandh was widely observed, and 24 people were killed during it. The violence that occurred in 1986 was made more severe by a desire for revenge across communities in Ahmedabad, driven by the incidents of the previous year. Soon after the shutdown on 12 July, Indian Home Minister P. Chidambaram flew into the city, and soon after 54 companies of security forces, including the Border Security Force and the Central Reserve Police Force, were brought in to patrol the city. 61 people were detained under the National Security Act, and an attempt by the same Hindu group to hold another procession was prevented by the police, who feared further violence.

=== Causes and impacts ===
The caste-related violence and the communal violence have been described as having a common origin. People belonging to upper castes saw the increasing social and economic opportunity available to lower castes as threatening their status and their caste identity. Political alliances between lower castes, Muslims, and adivasis, such as in Solanki's KHAM coalition, led to the belief among upper castes that all "minorities" were responsible for this threat. Conversely, despite their newfound social mobility, lower caste people were often denied social acceptance, which led to mounting frustration among them. Hindu nationalist groups, including the BJP, were able to offer a Hindu identity as an antidote to both these groups. As a result, the violence that began over caste-related tensions turned into communal violence, and Muslims, who played no role in the reservation debate, were victimized.

During the riots, in primarily upper caste neighborhoods, lower castes were the main targets of violence; in working-class regions, however, Muslims were the primary targets, and the perpetrators of violence often had the support of the police. According to testimony from Dalits, members of the BJP legislative assembly who during the riots in 1981 had assaulted them gave them money, food, and weapons during the 1985 violence. Muslims were used as scapegoats during the riots by many Hindu politicians, as it allowed them to unify Hindu voters and gain their support. This shift from caste-based violence to communal violence also strengthened the Hindu nationalist movement, and specifically strengthened the BJP's standing in Gujarat.

In addition to the immediate conflict over the reservation policy, several factors have been described as driving the violence of 1985. The conflict was exacerbated by land developers seizing an opportunity to remove slum dwellers from desired property by any available means, and by conflicts over the bootleg liquor industry in the nominally dry state. Shani suggestion that the killing of police sub-inspector Mahendrasingh Rana in May was the result of conflicts between local bootleggers and the police over payoffs that the police were receiving. Nonetheless, police testimonies in court blamed Rana's death on communal violence. The commission that investigated the riots found another incident, initially described as caste-based violence, which it stated was the result of conflicts between bootleggers.

Scholar Howard Spodek wrote that the breakdown of law and order was at least partially affected by the lack of a clear chain of command within the Congress party, and in particular the party's reluctance to remove Solanki from power because of his electoral success in March 1985. Solanki's government was also described as using the violence for political gains. In contrast, when riots reoccurred in 1986, the Congress government in Delhi acted to suppress the riots far more quickly than it had the previous year. The BJP and its affiliates were also described as playing a more direct role in the violence. According to reformist and activist Asghar Ali Engineer, the BJP organized the riots to cause the downfall of the Solanki government. According to the government commission that investigated the riots, members of the Akhil Bharatiya Vidyarthi Parishad and the Vishva Hindu Parishad, along with those of the BJP, played a role in intensifying the violence.

== See also ==
- 1969 Gujarat riots
- 1980 Moradabad riots
- 2017 Northern India riots
- 2020 Delhi riots
- Religious violence in India
- Violence against Muslims in India

== Sources ==
- Engineer, Asghar Ali (2003). The Gujarat Carnage. Orient Blackswan. ISBN 978-8125024965.
- Shani, Ornit (2007). Communalism, Caste and Hindu Nationalism: The Violence in Gujarat. Cambridge University Press. ISBN 978-0521727532.
- Spodek, Howard (1989). "From Gandhi to Violence: Ahmedabad's 1985 Riots in Historical Perspective". Modern Asian Studies. 23 (4): 765–795. doi:10.1017/S0026749X00010209. S2CID 145762249.
