= Ajit Bhattacharjea =

Indian activist for women's rights

- Born: 8 May 1924
- Died: 4 April 2011 (aged 86); New Delhi, India
- Occupation: Journalist
- Known for: Campaigner of civil liberties
- Children: 3

Ajit Bhattacharjea (8 May 1924 – 4 April 2011) was a veteran Indian journalist, newspaper editor and campaigner for democratic rights, and the Right to Information Act. In a career spanning nearly 60 years, he remained the editor of the Hindustan Times, The Times of India and The Indian Express and after his retirement in 1983, was the director of the Press Institute of India till 2004.

A fellow of the Indian Institute of Advanced Study, he also edited the journal, Transparency Review, published by Centre for Media Studies (CMS) in Delhi.

== Early life and education ==
Born in Shimla, Bhattacharjea did his B.A. and M.A. from St. Stephen's College, Delhi.

== Career ==
Bhattacharjea started his career as an apprentice sub—editor and reporter with the Hindustan Times in 1946. Here, in 1947, he first covered the Indo-Pakistani War of 1947, and went there again as war spilled on to 1948. He remained associated with Kashmir related issue for the majority of his career. He joined The Statesman in New Delhi, in 1951, though he returned to the Hindustan Times in 1961 as its Washington correspondent and at the United Nations. This was followed by his move back to Delhi in 1967, when he assumed the editorship of Delhi edition.

A few years later in 1971, he changed path again as he became the resident editor of The Times of India in Bombay (now Mumbai). This was the period he also came close to socialist leader Jayaprakash Narayan; this led to him leaving his job and editing Everyman's Weekly, a short lived weekly published Narayan. However, soon the weekly was closed during the Emergency imposed by Indira Gandhi. Nevertheless, he was appointed the editor of The Indian Express, where he continued to offer vocal opposition to the government policies and censorship. He was one of the first journalists to bring to light the issue of farmers being dispossessed of their land in the name of development.

In 1983, post his retirement, Bhattacharjea served as Editorial Adviser of The Democrat in Nigeria, and subsequently of Deccan Herald in Bangalore. He became the Director of the Press Institute of India in 1995, where he edited the institute's journal Vidura and also launched, a monthly journal Grassroots, on the reportage of local development issues from English and Indian-language press. In the 1980s, he opposed the infamous Defamation Bill proposed by then Rajiv Gandhi union government, and which was later withdrawn in 1988.

He was long associated with RTI movement in Rajasthan and civil liberties movement of Kashmir and Chhattisgarh. Hence at age 80, when he retired from the Press Institute of India, he went on to join the Centre for Media Studies (CMS) in New Delhi as the editor of its journal, Transparency Review, which focusses on the issue of the right to information.

A Fellow of the Indian Institute of Advanced Study, Shimla for three years, he was also a founder member of Editors' Guild of India. Through his career, he wrote and edited numerous books, like Dateline Bangladesh, Kashmir: The Wounded Valley, Countdown to Partition, Tragic Hero of Kashmir: Sheikh Abdullah and Social Justice and the Constitution. He also published a biography of Jayaprakash Narayan titled, Jayaprakash Narayan: A Political Biography.

At age 87, he died on 5 April 2011 at his home in Panchsheel Park, New Delhi, after a six-month illness due to brain tumour, having refused any surgery or chemotherapy. He was survived by his son Aditya, daughters Suman and Nomita, and three grandchildren.

== Bibliography ==
- Ajit Bhattacharjea (1969). Report on Ahmedabad (1969 Gujarat riots). Sampradayikta Virodhi Committee.
- Ajit Bhattacharjea (1971). Dateline Bangla Desh. Jaico Publishing House.
- Ajit Bhattacharjea (1973). Political Evolution of Nagaland, 1945–1965. Book Trust.
- Ajit Bhattacharjea (1978). Jayaprakash Narayan: a political biography. Vikas Pub. House. ISBN 978-0-8364-0115-8.
- Ajit Bhattacharjea (1994). Kashmir: The Wounded Valley. UBS Publishers'. ISBN 978-81-86112-36-6.
- Ajit Bhattacharjea (1997). Social justice and the constitution. Indian Institute of Advanced Study. ISBN 978-81-85952-44-4.
- Ajit Bhattacharjea (1997). Countdown to partition: the final days. HarperCollins Publishers India. ISBN 978-81-7223-298-6.
- Ajit Bhattacharjea (1998). "JP's Message (Lecture on Jayaprakash Narayan's birth anniversary at Jaipur on October 11, 1998)". Mainstream Weekly.
- Jayaprakash Narayan; Ajit Bhattacharjea (2002). Transforming the polity: centenary readings from Jayaprakash Narayan. Rupa & Co. ISBN 978-81-7167-986-7.
- Ajit Bhattacharjea (2004). Unfinished revolution: a political biography of Jayaprakash Narayan. Rupa & Co.
- Ajit Bhattacharjea (2005). Giving Voice to the Unheard: A Guide to Development Journalism. National Foundation for India.
