= Maya Kodnani =

Indian politician

Member of Legislative Assembly, Gujarat
- In office 1998–2012
- Preceded by: Gopaldas Bhojwani
- Succeeded by: Nirmala Wadhwani
- Constituency: Naroda

Personal details
- Born: 1956 (age 69–70) Itanagar, Arunachal Pradesh, India
- Party: Bharatiya Janata Party

Maya Surendrakumar Kodnani is a former Minister of State for Women and Child Development in the Government of Gujarat, India. Kodnani joined the 12th legislative assembly of Gujarat after being elected to represent the constituency of Naroda as a candidate for the Bharatiya Janata Party.

In 2012, Kodnani was sentenced to twenty-eight years' imprisonment for her participation in the Naroda Patiya massacre during the 2002 Gujarat riots but acquitted in 2018 by the Gujarat High Court. Kodnani was one of the most high-profile individuals to be convicted in the case, as well as being the only woman among the accused.

== Early life & education ==
Kodnani is the daughter of a Sindhi Rashtriya Swayamsevak Sangh (RSS) worker who moved to India during the Indian Partition. She had her early education in a Gujarati-medium school. She also joined Rashtra Sevika Samiti, the parallel organisation of RSS for women.

Kodnani joined the Baroda Medical College from where she did her MBBS and Diploma in Gynaecology and Obstetrics. She set up Shivam Maternity Hospital at Kubernagar in Naroda, Ahmedabad.

== Political career ==
Kodnani began her political career with Ahmedabad civic elections in 1995. She was elected three times from the Naroda constituency as a Member of the Legislative Assembly for the BJP. In 1998, she won the election with a margin of 75,000 votes. In December 2002, shortly after 2002 Gujarat riots, she won by a margin of 110,000 votes. In 2007, her margin increased 180,000 votes. After winning the elections in 2007, she was named as Minister for Women and Child Development of Gujarat in Narendra Modi's BJP government, but resigned from the post in 2009 pending her arrest as accused for the Naroda Patiya massacre.

== Role in the 2002 Gujarat riots ==
Kodnani was convicted of orchestrating the Naroda Gam and Naroda Patiya massacres of the 2002 Gujarat riots on 28 February 2002, in which 97 Muslims, including 36 women and 35 children, were murdered by stabbing, dismemberment and being burned alive individually as well as in groups. Witnesses testified that Kodnani was at the scene of the crimes, handed out swords to Hindu rioters, exhorted them to attack Muslims and at one point fired a pistol. Bajrang Dal members Suresh Richard and Prakash Rathod told Tehelka's journalists on spy camera that Kodnani drove around Naroda all day, urging the mob to hunt Muslims down and kill them. Mobile phone records also placed her at the scene and showed her to be in regular communication with the top police officials, the Home Minister Gordhan Zadaphia and the Chief Minister's office. The mobile phone records were buried by the police and brought to light by the Nanavati-Mehta Commission in 2004. They were later investigated by R. K. Raghavan-led Special Investigation Team (SIT) appointed by the Supreme Court of India in 2008.

Kodnani ignored notices for deposition by the SIT, which declared her an absconder in February 2009. She obtained an anticipatory bail from a sessions court, which was revoked by the Gujarat High Court on 27 March 2009, leading to her subsequent arrest.

She was tried in the Naroda Patiya massacre case and, on 31 August 2012, convicted of murder and conspiracy to commit murder and sentenced to 28 years in prison. The court judgement called her the "kingpin of the Naroda Patiya massacre." Kodnani continued to maintain her innocence, claiming that she was at the Sola Civil Hospital at the time of the riots, meeting the relatives of Godhra victims.

On 17 April 2013, the Gujarat government filed an appeal in the High Court seeking the death penalty for Kodnani but withdrew it on 14 May. In November 2013, she was granted an interim bail of three months for treatment of intestinal tuberculosis. On 30 July 2014, Gujarat High Court granted bail to her on grounds of ill health and suspended her prison sentence. On 20 April 2018, the High Court overturned the trial court's findings and acquitted Maya Kodnani, while upholding the conviction of Suresh Richard and Prakash Rathod.

== Personal life ==
Maya Kodnani is married to Surendra Kodnani, who is a general physician.
