= Nirmala Wadhwani =

Indian politician

Nirmla Wadhwani

Member of Legislative Assembly, Gujarat
- In office 2012–2017
- Preceded by: Maya Kodnani
- Succeeded by: Balram Thawani
- Constituency: Naroda

Personal details
- Born: 1964 (age 61–62)
- Party: Bharatiya Janata Party

Nirmla Wadhwani is an Indian politician from Gujarat. She has served as the Minister for Women and Child Development, in the cabinet of chief minister Vijay Rupani. She was previously a physician with specialization in Obstetrics and Gynaecology.

== Early life ==
Wadhwani is of Sindhi heritage. She earned a diploma in sonography from Croatia.

== Work ==
She was the President of Ahmedabad Medical Association's Ladies Wing. She is from the Bharatiya Janata Party (BJP). As a member of the Gujarat Legislative Assembly, she has served on the committees on ICDS, PC-PNDT, Shala Arogya and MLA Quarters. She won the 2012 Gujarat Legislative Assembly election from Naroda. In August 2016, she was appointed as Gujarat's Minister for Women and Child Development, in the cabinet of chief minister Vijay Rupani.

== Controversy ==
In February 2017 session of the Gujarat Legislative Assembly, a debate on the issue of farmer's suicide turned into a scuffle, during which Wadhwani was injured. She accused a few MLA's of the Indian National Congress for injuring her arm. Following the incident, her name was not included in the Bharatiya Janata Party's (BJP) official list of candidates for the 2017 Gujarat Legislative Assembly election.
