= 1980 Moradabad riots =

Religious clashes in Uttar Pradesh, India

- Part of Religious violence in India
- Location of the Moradabad district in Uttar Pradesh
- Date: August–November 1980
- Location: Moradabad district, Uttar Pradesh India
- Methods: Killing, Arson and Looting

Parties
Police, Hindus	Muslims

The 1980 Moradabad riots happened in the Indian city of Moradabad during August–November 1980. When a pig entered the local Idgah during the Eid festival prayer on 13 August, local Muslims asked the police to remove the pig, but the police refused to do so. This led to a confrontation between the police and the Muslims. The police responded with indiscriminate firing, which led to many deaths. This was followed by a series of violent incidents which became religious in nature, and led to arson, looting and murders.

The violent incidents continued until November 1980. The total death tally is uncertain: Justice MP Saxena Committee's Report found 83 deaths in communal rioting. However unofficial reports claim the death toll to be in several hundreds, as high as 2500. The riots greatly affected the city's noted brassware industry, which saw a sharp decline in the production and export figures.

== Background ==
Moradabad has a history of Hindu-Muslim riots; the first such riot occurred in 1848, followed by another one in 1872. In the 1880s, there were more Hindu voters in the city. However, the Muslim secretary of the Municipality always drew the electoral ward boundaries in such a way that Hindus were concentrated in one ward, while the Muslims had the majority in the remaining five wards. As a result, the Muslims always had the majority in the municipal body. Following protests by the Hindus, the ward boundaries were re-drawn and the Hindus gained majority in the municipality. Both the communities used their administrative power to assert their religious interests, leading to communal animosity.

In the 1930s, the Muslim League, which demanded a separate country for Muslims, gained popularity in Moradabad. The local leader and lawyer Qazi Taslim Husain turned the Islamic Musafir Khana near the Moradabad railway station into a center for separatist politics in the city. The Hindu organizations Arya Samaj and Rashtriya Swayamsevak Sangh (RSS) organized akharas in the city, campaigning against the Muslims. Following the partition of India, widespread riots broke out in the city in January 1948. Again in 1978, Hindu-Muslim violence broke out in Sambhal (then part of the Moradabad district).

== The trigger ==
The tensions between Hindus and Muslims had been running high since the kidnap of a Dalit girl by some Muslims in March 1980. The Dalits and Muslims used to live in separate bastis (colonies) near an Idgah. The girl was later rescued, and her kidnapper was arrested. In July, on the day of her marriage to a Dalit boy, some Muslims obstructed the marriage procession complaining about loud music near the mosque. The argument soon escalated into a violent clash between the two communities, followed by looting of several houses.

On 13 August 1980, a domesticated pig from the Dalit colony strayed into the Idgah during the Id prayer. Around 50,000 Muslims were attending Eid prayers at the location. The Muslims, who considered the pigs as haraam, believed that the pig had been deliberately released by the Hindu Dalits. They asked an on-duty policeman to chase the pig away, but he refused to do so, leading to a heated argument. The violence broke out when some Muslims pelted stones at the policemen. The Senior Superintendent of Police (SSP) collapsed when a stone hit his forehead, and the Additional District Magistrate (ADM) DP Singh was dragged away by some people; he was found dead later. The policemen then started firing indiscriminately into the crowd. The police force was reinforced by the Provincial Armed Constabulary (PAC) troops that arrived in trucks along with the District Magistrate. Several Muslims were killed in the firing; about 50 more died in a stampede that followed the firing. The Muslim leader Syed Shahabuddin later compared the firing to the Jallianwala Bagh massacre.

== The riots ==
The surviving Muslim crowd at the Idgah soon turned into a mob, and indulged in mass looting and arson of the Dalit slums. The Muslim mobs beat up the policemen in different localities of the city. They burnt a PAC constable to death. In the evening, a Muslim mob attacked the Galshaheed police chowki (outpost), setting it on fire, killing two policemen and looting the arms. This was followed by violent reprisals by the police.

On the next day, 14 August, the Jamaat-e-Islami organized a gathering of the Muslim leaders from the various political parties, and issued a statement condemning the riots. Subsequently, the violence acquired a religious nature and spread to the rural areas of the Moradabad district. The violence also spread to the neighbouring city of Aligarh. The army troops were posted in the region to control the violence. By 2 September, the situation in Moradabad was brought under control, and the army started withdrawing.

The violence continued on a smaller scale until November 1980. A major incidence of violence occurred in September, on the day of the Hindu festival Raksha Bandhan. At the end of October, a series of stabbings and killings resulted in at least 14 deaths.

== Aftermath ==
The riots happened when Congress leader V. P. Singh was the chief minister. The Union Minister Yogendra Makwana blamed the violence on the RSS, Jan Sangh and Bharatiya Janata Party (BJP). The Prime Minister Indira Gandhi suggested that "foreign forces" (referring to Pakistan) and "communal parties" were behind the violence. The Times of India editor Girilal Jain stated that the "anti-social elements" among the Muslims were partly responsible for the violence, and criticized the Muslim leaders for not admitting to the facts and instead blaming the RSS. He also gave credence to Indira Gandhi's "foreign hand" theory, and published an article listing the number of Pakistani visitors to Uttar Pradesh. The BJP leader Lal Krishna Advani blamed the Muslim organizations for the violence. The government appointed Justice Saxena of the Allahabad High Court to investigate the riots. The Justice Saxena report, submitted in May 1983, indicted Muslim leaders and V. P. Singh for the violence.

Journalist and BJP MP MJ Akbar wrote in his book Riot after Riot that the incident "was not a Hindu-Muslim riot but a calculated cold-blooded massacre of Muslims by a rabidly communal police force which tried to cover up its genocide by making it out to be a Hindu-Muslim riot.” EPW correspondent Krishna Gandhi claimed that the "group of criminals supported by ML leaders" were responsible for the massacres. According to him, the firing occurred after Muslims beat up policemen, and the excesses committed by the police were, according to him, a reaction to Muslim attacks.

=== Judicial Commission Report ===
A judicial commission was constituted led by retired Allahabad High Court Judge Justice Mathura Prasad Saxena to investigate the clashes. The commission submitted its report in November 1983. However the Report was not made public by the successive governments. The 496- page report was tabled in Uttar Pradesh Assembly after 40 years of the riots. The Report held IUML leader Dr. Shamim Ahmed Khan and his supporters responsible for the riots. The report justified Police firing in self defense, Shamin Khan deliberately spread rumors that pigs have been let loose at Eidgah on Eid Day, it enraged the Muslim community and they launched attacks on Police stations and other communities.

The commission also denied any role of RSS, BJP or Dalit Organizations in the riots.
