= Naroda =

- town
- Location in Ahmedabad, Gujarat, India Naroda (Gujarat)
- Coordinates: 23°05′N 72°40′E
- Country: India
- State: Gujarat

Languages
  - Official: Gujarati, Hindi
- Time zone: UTC+5:30 (IST)
- PIN: 382330
- Telephone code: 079
- Area in city of: Ahmedabad

Naroda is a fast-growing area in Ahmedabad, northeast of central Ahmedabad in the Indian state of Gujarat.

== History ==
- Early Development: Originally a small agricultural village, Naroda benefited from its strategic location along trade routes.
- Industrial Boom (1980s): The establishment of the Naroda Industrial Area in the 1980s transformed it into an industrial hub, attracting workers and boosting the local economy.
- Incorporation into Ahmedabad (1996): Naroda became part of Ahmedabad Municipal Corporation, leading to improved infrastructure and services.
- 21st Century Transformation: In the early 2000s, Naroda shifted from an industrial area to a desirable residential neighborhood, with the real estate sector thriving alongside modern amenities.
- Cultural Diversity: The growth attracted a mix of communities, enriching the local culture with various traditions and festivals.
- Future Prospects: Ongoing development and urban planning initiatives aim to sustain Naroda's growth while maintaining its unique character.

== Geography ==
It is 8 km from Ahmedabad International Airport on the SP Ring Road, Naroda is situated on the emerging Gandhinagar-Ahmedabad-Vadodara (GAV) corridor.

Naroda is near the intersection of National Highway No. 8 and National Highway 59. It is near Bapunagar. Kalupur and Krishnanagar, the geographic center of Ahmedabad, are 5 km away. The Sardar Patel ring road crosses in front of Naroda.

Naroda has two parts: Juna Naroda (Old Naroda) and Nava Naroda (New Naroda). At the center of Naroda (called Naroda Gam or Naroda Bazaar) are an old fountain and a newly developed park.

== Demographics ==
Naroda is predominantly populated by Hindus and Jains. Most of the residents are Gujaratis. A substantial amount of Sindhis also live there.

== Economy ==
Naroda has flourished due to its proximity to SVPI (Sardar Vallabh bhai Patel International Airport) Airport and the Ahmedabad Railway Station.

The Naroda GIDC industrial park hosts national and multinational corporations such as Reliance Industries Ltd, Siemens Energy ,PepsiCo, Ingersoll-Rand, Dresser Industries, Lubi Elcectronics, Lubi Pumps, Harshtaiana, Laxmi Engineers Arvind Mills, Umiya Textile and Nirman Textile. Pharmaceutical companies include Dishman, Tuton, Westcoast and Maccure. India's snack food manufacturer Havmor Ice Cream Ltd, Samrat Namkin is located there.

Several major township projects are emerging along the Ahmedabad Vadodara Expressway centered on Naroda. In the 2008 Vibrant Gujarat summit, 24 projects worth more than Rs 1,000 crore were slated to be developed in and along the Ahmedabad-Vadodara expressway. Projects include hospitals, clubs, educational institutions, NRI residential colonies, a business park and a 120-room hotel.

== Transport ==
Naroda railway station is the main railway station of the town. Kalupur Railway Station is approx 8.5 km), Airport (SVP Airport approx 8 km) and Bus Station (Krishnnagar approx 5 km) are within 10 kilometers of Naroda.

== Education ==
A government commerce college operates there. Among the many schools are an international school and preschools.

== Climate ==
Naroda has a hot semi arid climate (BSh), narrowly missing a tropical savanna climate (Aw).

Climate data for Naroda
Month	Jan	Feb	Mar	Apr	May	Jun	Jul	Aug	Sep	Oct	Nov	Dec	Year
Mean daily maximum °C (°F)	28 (82)	31 (88)	36 (97)	44 (111)	42 (108)	38 (100)	33 (91)	32 (90)	34 (93)	36 (97)	33 (91)	30 (86)	35 (95)
Average rainfall mm (inches)	2 (0.1)	1 (0.0)	1 (0.0)	1 (0.0)	10 (0.4)	90 (3.5)	311 (12.2)	209 (8.2)	127 (5.0)	12 (0.5)	6 (0.2)	2 (0.1)	772 (30.4)

== Culture ==
Naroda features temples such as the Lord Sankar temple (a historical temple of Shri nareshwar mahadev), Ranchodrai, Satyanarayan and Padmavati Mataji's Jain Temple, Hanumanji Mandir, Ayyappa Temple, Gokuliya Hanuman, Ganesh Temple. It also has Mahaprabhuji's Bethak, a famous pilgrim place for Vaishnavites. It is believed that Mahaprabhu stayed there. Swaminarayan Mandir Vasana Sanstha) temple is there.

The Naroda Patiya massacre (Note: Since most of the killings were done in Naroda Patiya, the incident was termed Naroda Patiya massacre instead of Naroda massacre.) took place on 28 February 2002 at Naroda during the 2002 Gujarat riots. 97 Muslims were killed by a mob of approximately 5,000 people, organised by the Bajrang Dal, a wing of the Vishva Hindu Parishad, and allegedly supported by the Bharatiya Janata Party which was in power in the Gujarat State Government. (Note: Human Rights Watch & 2002 a, Tehelka & 2007 b, Tehelka & 2007 c, Indian Express & 2007 a, The Hindu & 2012 a, Hindustan Times & 2012 e) The riot lasted over 10 hours, during which the mob looted, stabbed, sexually assaulted, gang-raped and burnt people individually and in groups.

== Notables ==
The late business tycoon Dhirubhai Ambani started his first textile mill in Naroda in 1977.
