= Human rights in India =

Human rights in India is an issue complicated by the country's large size and population as well as its diverse culture, despite its status as the world's largest sovereign, secular, socialist democratic republic. The Constitution of India provides for fundamental rights, which include freedom of religion, freedom of speech, as well as separation of executive and judiciary and freedom of movement within the country and abroad. The country also has an independent judiciary as well as bodies to look into issues of human rights.

The 2016 report of Human Rights Watch accepts the above-mentioned facilities but goes to state that India has "serious human rights concerns. Civil society groups face harassment and government critics face intimidation and lawsuits. Free speech has come under attack both from the state and by interest groups. Muslim and Christian minorities accuse authorities of not doing enough to protect their rights. The government is yet to repeal laws that grant public officials and security forces impunity from prosecution for abuses."

== Chronology of events ==
1950	The Constitution of India establishes a sovereign democratic republic with universal adult franchise. Part 3 of the Constitution contains a Bill of Fundamental Rights enforceable by the Supreme Court and the High Courts. It also provides for reservations for previously disadvantaged sections in education, employment and political representation.
1952	Criminal Tribes Acts repealed by government, former "criminal tribes" categorized as "denotified" and Habitual Offenders Act (1952) enacted.
1955	The Untouchability (Offences) Act, 1955. Reform of family law concerning Hindus gives more rights to Hindu women.
1958	Armed Forces (Special Powers) Act, 1958
1973	Supreme Court of India rules in Kesavananda Bharati case that the basic structure of the Constitution (including many fundamental rights) is unalterable by a constitutional amendment.
1975–1977	State of Emergency in India. Extensive rights violations take place.
1978	SC rules in Menaka Gandhi v. Union of India that the right to life under Article 21 of the Constitution cannot be suspended even in an emergency.
1978	Jammu and Kashmir Public Safety Act, 1978
1984	Operation Blue Star and the subsequent 1984 Anti-Sikh riots
1984	2006 Extrajudicial disappearances in Punjab by the police
1985–1986	The Shah Bano case, where the Supreme Court recognised the Muslim woman's right to maintenance upon divorce, sparks protests from Muslim clergy. To nullify the decision of the Supreme Court, the Rajiv Gandhi government enacted The Muslim Women (Protection of Rights on Divorce) Act 1986
1987	Hashimpura massacre during communal riots in Meerut.
1989	Scheduled Caste and Scheduled Tribe (Prevention of Atrocities) Act, 1989 is passed.
1989–present	Kashmiri insurgency sees ethnic cleansing of Kashmiri Pandits, desecrating Hindu temples, killing of Hindus and Sikhs, and abductions of foreign tourists and government functionaries. (See: Ethnic cleansing of Kashmiri Hindus)
1992	A constitutional amendment establishes Local Self-Government (Panchayati Raj) as a third tier of governance at the village level, with one-third of the seats reserved for women. Reservations were provided for scheduled castes and tribes as well.
1992	Demolition of the Babri Masjid occurred after a political rally at the site turned violent.
1993	National Human Rights Commission is established under the Protection of Human Rights Act.
2001	Supreme Court passes extensive orders to implement the right to food.
2002	2002 Gujarat riots which claimed at least a thousand lives of Muslims and Hindus.
2005	A powerful Right to Information Act is passed to give citizen's access to information held by public authorities.
2005	National Rural Employment Guarantee Act (NREGA) guarantees universal right to employment.
2006	Supreme Court orders police reforms in response to the poor human rights record of Indian police.
2009	Delhi High Court declares that Section 377 of the Indian Penal Code, which outlaws a range of unspecified "unnatural" sex acts, is unconstitutional when applied to homosexual acts between private consenting individuals, effectively decriminalising homosexual relationships in India. See also: Homosexuality in India.
2013	Criminal Law (Amendment) Act was passed by the Lok Sabha on 19 March 2013, and by the Rajya Sabha on 21 March 2013, which provides for amendment of Indian Penal Code, Indian Evidence Act, and Code of Criminal Procedure, 1973 on laws related to sexual offences.
2026	The Supreme Court declared the right to walk as a fundamental right

== Civil liberties ==
In 2021, United States-based Freedom House ranked India as partly free, at 67 points (0–100, higher is better), in its annual Freedom in the World rankings on political rights and civil liberties.

Since 2019 and as of 2023, annual reports on the state of democracy around the world Sweden-based V-Dem Institute classified India as an electoral autocracy because of "restrictions on multiple facets of democracy" such as civil society groups and free speech. The 2023 report stated that, "The process of autocratisation seems to have slowed down considerably or even stalled in India but after turning into autocracies." India was previously classified as an electoral democracy up until 2018.

== Use of torture by police ==
The Asian Centre for Human Rights estimated that from 2002 to 2008, over four people per day died while in police custody, with "hundreds" of those deaths being due to police use of torture. According to a report written by the Institute of Correctional Administration in Punjab, up to 50% of police officers in the country have used physical or mental abuse on prisoners. Instances of torture, such as through a lack of sanitation, space, or water have been documented in West Bengal as well.

A report by the National Campaign Against Torture (NCAT), an international human rights body revealed as many as 1,731 custodial deaths recorded in India in 2019. Victims were mostly from vulnerable communities, Dalits, Muslims and Adivasis. During the 10-year period to 2019–20, the National Human Rights Commission (NHRC) reported, on average, 139 police custody cases and 1,576 judicial custody cases annually. In the eight years to 2019–20, the NHRC reported more than 1,500 judicial custody deaths each year.

== Freedom of religion ==
=== Religious violence ===
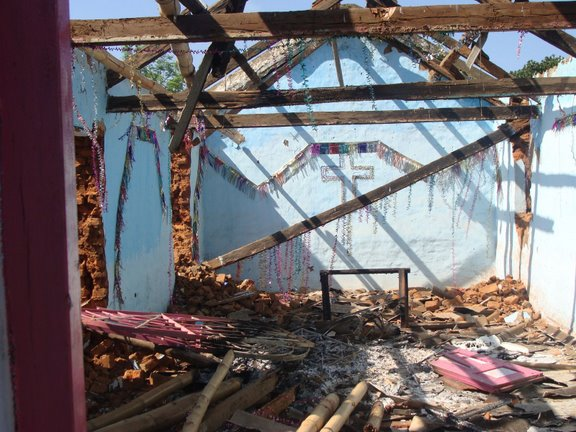
Remains of a church property burnt down during the anti-Christian violence in Orissa in August 2008

Communal conflicts between religious groups (mostly between Hindus and Muslims) have been prevalent in India since around the time of its independence from British rule. Communal riots took place during the partition of India between Hindus/Sikhs and Muslims where large numbers of people were killed in large-scale violence.

The 1984 Anti-Sikh Riots was a four-day period during which Sikhs were massacred in India. According to some estimates state that more than 2,000 were killed. Investigations by various committees appointed both by the government and independent civil societies have found complicity on the part of Indira Gandhi's Congress party. Other incidents include the 1987 Hashimpura massacre during communal riots in Meerut, where it was alleged that 19 members of the Provincial Armed Constabulary shot 42 Muslim youths in cold blood, and dumped their bodies in a nearby irrigation canal, 1992 Bombay riots and the 2020 Delhi riots, which resulted in the death of about 53 people, 36 among whom were Muslims and 15 were Hindus. It is commonly believed that the riots were incited by a threatening speech and an ultimatum targeted towards peaceful anti-CAA protesters by Kapil Mishra, a BJP politician from Delhi. The Supreme Court of India blamed the Delhi police for "unprofessionalism" during the Delhi riots and directly indicated that the police were waiting for the Central Government of India led by the Bharatiya Janata Party to give them instructions, instead of acting independently and conscientiously. In the hearing, Justice K.M. Joseph said – "Look at how police acts in the UK. If somebody makes an inflammatory remark, they swing into action. They don't wait for orders. Police should not be looking for here and there for nods".

According to official figures, 2002 Gujarat riots ended with 1,044 dead, 223 missing, and 2,500 injured. Of the dead, 790 were Muslim and 254 Hindu. Unofficial sources estimate that up to 2,000 people died. There were instances of rape, children being burned alive, and widespread looting and destruction of property. It is believed to have been incited by the Godhra train burning, where 59 people (who were mostly returning from Ayodhya after a religious celebration at the Babri Masjid demolition site) were burnt to death. Subsequently, circulation of false news in local newspapers alleging ISI hand in the attacks and that the local Muslims conspired with them, and also about false stories of kidnap and rape of Hindu women by Muslims further inflamed the situation. Numerous accounts describe the attacks to be highly coordinated with mobile phones and government issued printouts listing the homes and businesses of Muslims. Although many calls to the police were made from victims, they were told by the police that "we have no orders to save you."

The house of prominent human rights activist, J.S. Bandukwala was burnt down in Vadodara and he barely escaped with his life. In many cases, the police led the charge, using gunfire to kill Muslims who got in the mobs' way. According to a 2002 Human Rights Watch report, a key Bharatiya Janata Party state minister is reported to have taken over police control rooms in Ahmedabad on the first day of the carnage, issuing orders to disregard pleas for assistance from Muslims. Portions of the Gujarati language press meanwhile printed fabricated stories and statements openly calling on Hindus to avenge the Godhra attacks. Also in many cases, under the guise of offering assistance, the police led the victims directly into the hands of their killers. The then Chief minister of Gujarat, Narendra Modi was cleared of the accusations levied against him by a local court based on the investigation carried out by a Special Investigation Team. However, this report was challenged by Zakia Jafri, whose husband Ehsan Jafri, a former Congress politician, was killed by a mob in Ahmedabad city. Ms. Jafri claimed the investigation had revealed sufficient evidence to implicate Mr. Modi and 62 others. The Supreme Court of India, subsequently turned down a plea challenging the clean cheat given to Modi. The 2020 report by the United States Commission for International religious freedom designated India as a Country of Particular Concern

== Caste related issues ==
Contemporary India has seen the influence of caste start to decline. This is partly due to the spread of education to all castes which has had a democratising effect on the political system. However, this "equalising" of the playing field has not been without controversy. The Mandal Commission and its quotas system has been a particularly sensitive issue. It has been argued by Professor Dipankar Gupta that the role of castes in Indian elections have been overplayed.

More recently there has been a flux in caste politics, mainly caused by economic liberalisation in India. This upsurge in lower-caste empowerment was accompanied in some regions by a spike in the level of corruption. Law enforcement, as well as countless development programmes, have been used by the upper-caste to subjugate the lower-caste.

Amnesty International says "it is the responsibility of the Indian government to fully enact and apply its legal provisions against discrimination on the basis of caste and descent.

Denotified Tribes, along with many nomadic tribes collectively 60 million in population, continue to face social stigma and economic hardships, despite the fact Criminal Tribes Act 1871, was repealed by the government in 1952 and replaced by Habitual Offenders Act (HOA) (1952), as effectively it only created a new list out of the old list of so-called "criminal tribes. These tribes even today face the consequences of the 'Prevention of Anti-Social Activity Act' (PASA), which only adds to their everyday struggle for existence as most of them live below poverty line. The National Human Rights Commission and United Nations' anti-discrimination body Committee on the Elimination of Racial Discrimination (CERD) have asked the government to repeal this law as well, as these former "criminalised" tribes continue to suffer oppression and social ostracization at large and many have been denied SC, ST or OBC status, denying them access to reservations which would elevate their economic and social status.

== Freedom of expression ==
2025 World Press Freedom Index Good: 85–100 points Satisfactory: 70–85 points Problematic: 55–70 points Difficult: 40–55 points Very serious <40 points Not classified

In 2010, according to the non-governmental organization Reporters Without Borders's World Press Freedom Index, India ranks 122nd (down from 105th in 2009). The country has 38.75 points in 2010 (29.33 for 2009) on a scale that runs from 0 (least free) to 105 (most free). In 2014 India was down ranked to 140th worldwide (score of 40.34 out of 105) but despite this remains one of the best scores in the region.

The Indian Constitution, while not mentioning the word "press", provides for "the right to freedom of speech and expression" (Article 19(1) a). However this right is subject to restrictions under subclause (2), whereby this freedom can be restricted for reasons of "sovereignty and integrity of India, the security of the State, friendly relations with foreign States, public order, preserving decency, preserving morality, in relation to contempt of court, defamation, or incitement to an offence". Laws such as the Official Secrets Act and Prevention of Terrorism Act (POTA) have been used to limit press freedom. Under POTA, person could be detained for up to six months before the police were required to bring charges on allegations for terrorism-related offenses. POTA was repealed in 2004, but was replaced by amendments to UAPA. The Official Secrets Act 1923 was abolished after right to information act 2005

For the first half-century of independence, media control by the state was the major constraint on press freedom. Indira Gandhi famously stated in 1975 that All India Radio is "a Government organ, it is going to remain a Government organ".

With the liberalisation starting in the 1990s, private control of media has burgeoned, leading to increasing independence and greater scrutiny of government.

Organisations like Tehelka and NDTV have been particularly influential, in bringing about the resignation of powerful Haryana minister Venod Sharma. In addition, laws like Prasar Bharati act passed in recent years contribute significantly to reducing the control of the press by the government.

== LGBTQ rights ==
Until the Delhi High Court decriminalised consensual private sexual acts between consenting adults on 2 July 2009, homosexuality was considered criminal as per interpretations of the ambiguous Section 377 of the 150-year-old Indian Penal Code (IPC), a law passed by the British colonial government. However, this law was very rarely enforced. In its ruling decriminalising homosexuality, the Delhi High Court noted that existed law conflicted with the fundamental rights guaranteed by the Constitution of India, and such criminalising is violative of Articles 21, 14 and 15 of the Constitution.

On 11 December 2013, homosexuality was again criminalized by a Supreme Court ruling.

On 6 September 2018, a five judge constitutional bench of the Supreme Court of India, in a landmark judgement, decriminalized homosexuality while extending the ambit of Article 15 to include 'sexual orientation' to prohibit discrimination.

== By region ==
=== Assam ===
A Human Rights Watch report notes that journalists and human rights activists have been arrested for falsely reporting on human rights abuses. Assam continues to be one of the forefront states where the claims of human rights abuses have been committed by India. Resultant secessionist and pro-independence movements have intensified the political situation, with widespread allegations of human rights abuses being committed by Indian security forces yet without any concrete proofs for allegations. Freedom House stated in their 2013 report on India that journalists in rural areas and regions coping with insurgencies – including Assam – are vulnerable and face pressure from both sides of the conflicts.

=== Punjab ===
From 1984 to 1994, the state of Punjab in northern India was engaged in a power struggle between the militant secessionist Khalistan movement and Indian security forces. The Indian government responded to the escalating Punjab insurgency by launching Operation Blue Star in 1984, storming the Harmandir Sahib, or Golden Temple complex in Amritsar—the center of Sikh religious and spiritual life, where some militant groups had retreated. The Operation was controversial and resulted in death of hundreds of civilians, militants and soldiers. After this incident, Sikh bodyguards assassinated Prime Minister Indira Gandhi, further violence ensued.

The aftermath of these events were felt for more than a decade. According to a Human Rights Watch report, state security forces adopted "increasingly brutal methods to stem the insurgency, including arbitrary arrests, torture, prolonged detention without trial, disappearances and summary killings of civilians and suspected militants". Militant organizations responded with increased violence aimed at civilians, state security forces, and Sikh political leaders deemed to be negotiating with the government.

=== Jammu and Kashmir ===
Several international agencies, including the UN, have reported human rights violations in Jammu and Kashmir. In a press release the OHCHR spokesmen stated "The Office of the High Commissioner for Human Rights is concerned about the recent violent protests in Indian-administered Kashmir that have reportedly led to civilian casualties as well as restrictions to the right to freedom of assembly and expression." A 1996 Human Rights Watch (HRW) report accused the Indian military and Indian-government backed paramilitaries of "committ[ing] serious and widespread human rights violations in Kashmir". HRW has also accused Indian forces of "using rape as a means to punish and humiliate communities". There have been claims of extrajudicial killings, disappearances, and torture by the police and army in Kashmir by several human rights organisations, including Amnesty International and HRW. The Armed Forces Special Powers Act (AFSPA) which grants the military wide powers of arrest, the right to shoot to kill, and to occupy or destroy property in counterinsurgency operations was applied to Jammu and Kashmir in 1990, and has been applicable since. Indian officials claim that troops need such powers because the army is only deployed when national security is at serious risk from armed combatants. Such circumstances, they say, call for extraordinary measures. Human rights organisations have also asked Indian government to repeal the Public Safety Act, since "a detainee may be held in administrative detention for a maximum of two years without a court order." One 2008 report by Freedom House described Jammu and Kashmir as 'partly free'.In 2022, Human Rights Watch reported that continuing restrictions on freedom of expression, peaceful assembly, and political activity following the 2019 revocation of Jammu and Kashmir's special status constituted part of a broader pattern of political repression in Kashmir region, citing arbitrary detentions, media restrictions, and crackdowns on civil society organizations.

== Other human rights violations ==
Deception detection tests like "narcoanalysis" (controlled anesthesia), brain mapping, and lie detector tests were once commonly permitted by Indian courts for crime investigation. Concerns regarding human rights violations in conducting deception detection tests (DDT)s were raised long back and the National Human Rights Commission of India had published guidelines in 2000 for the administration of polygraph tests. However, only few of the investigating agencies were seen to follow these guidelines.

However, on 5 May 2010, the Supreme Court in India (Smt. Selvi vs. State of Karnataka) declared that "The test results cannot be admitted in evidence if they have been obtained through the use of compulsion." and "Article 20(3) protects an individual's choice between speaking and remaining silent, irrespective of whether the subsequent testimony proves to be inculpatory or exculpatory" as well as "any information or material that is subsequently discovered with the help of voluntary administered test results can be admitted, in accordance with Section 27 of the Evidence Act, 1872."

== Women's rights ==
=== Muslim women's rights ===
In recent decades, there has been increasing attention on issues concerning Muslim women's legal and social rights in India, particularly in relation to personal laws governing marriage, divorce, inheritance, and maintenance. These matters are regulated under the Muslim Personal Law (Shariat) Application Act of 1937, which allows community-specific interpretation of family law. Critics argue that some of these provisions contribute to gender inequality, especially in cases involving triple talaq (instant divorce) and polygamy

The Supreme Court of India's 2017 judgement in Shayara Bano v. Union of India declared the practice of instant triple talaq unconstitutional, marking a significant step toward gender justice within the Muslim community. Following the ruling, the Muslim Women (Protection of Rights on Marriage) Act, 2019 criminalised the practice, imposing penalties for violations

Muslim women's organisations such as the Bharatiya Muslim Mahila Andolan (BMMA) and the All India Muslim Women's Personal Law Board (AIMWPLB) have played key roles in advocating for reforms, improved legal literacy, and representation in religious and political institutions. These groups campaign for codification of Muslim personal law to ensure consistency with the Constitution of India, which guarantees equality before the law and prohibits discrimination based on gender or religion.

Despite these developments, socioeconomic inequality, limited political participation, and cultural stigma continue to affect many Muslim women, particularly in rural areas. Access to education, employment, and healthcare remains uneven, while intersectional factors such as class and region further compound disparities.

One of the vital concerns in India is the discrimination between genders. Muslim women in India are one of the major groups deprived of their equality within the human rights framework. Their hardship has derived from cultural and religious reasons. This includes being negatively stereotyped within religion and even progressive circles. This also includes patriarchal interpretations and male interpretations of the Quran and Islam. Muslim women face a double marginalisation by virtue of being part of a religious, as well as, a gender minority. Intersectional feminist groups argue that it is important to consider Muslim women's opinions regarding their autonomy or else people might end up stereotyping Muslim women and promoting Islamophobia.

==== Muslim Personal law ====
In India, only part of the Islamic law of Sharia is enforced: the legal system consists of civil law, common law, customary law, religious law and corporate law. Although Islamic law is considered sacred, due to modern political and social developments sacred interpretation of classic Islamic law's in India have changed in response to societal requirements.

===== Muslim Personal law and inequality =====
The Constitution of India outlines the fundamental rights to equality under Article 14. Article 15 covers freedom from discrimination which includes that of gender equality. However, Article 25 justifies the freedom of religion which safeguards the religious rights of Muslim communities, in turn Muslim Personal Law, which is discriminatory between Muslim men and women. The continuance of discrimination within Muslim personal law contravenes that set out in India's constitution, notably articles 14 and 15.

Even though there is formal recognition of rights within the constitution, Muslim women experience gender inequalities in practice within the sphere of personal law. Personal law enables the continuing practice of giving a lower status to Muslim women in India. Which raises the need for legal reform. This is hard to achieve because often uniformity of family laws are often upheld by staunch supporters of religious traditions, who tend to keep traditional Muslim practices within the conformity of Islamic ideals. The courts also favour to not let constitutional rights intrude in personal law. In the High Court case Harvinder Kaur v. Harmander Singh Choudhary, it was rejected that personal law was discriminatory towards Gender inequality in India and stated that the "...introduction of Constitutional law into the home is most inappropriate". The ruling can lead to deprivation of all woman in India the fundamental rights within the constitution as it places higher importance to religious laws over equality laws. Personal law discrimination was, on the other hand, positively recognised in the case of Amina, here the court noted that Muslim personal law is discriminatory towards Muslim women, and as such is unconstitutional.

Islamic law does however provide for certain rights. One example can be seen within a matrimonial deed, or Nikahnama. A Nikahnama can cover certain rights which pertain to polygamy and the woman's right to enforce a divorce proceeding. This could even include shares in property rights. Muslim law for financial support due to divorcement has been codified in the Muslim Women's (Protection of Rights on Divorce) Act 1986. Nevertheless, these rights remain minimal. For example, the divorced wife can only receive three months of financial support. Also, the husband of the divorced wife only has to pay child support for 3 months if that child is born within the three-month period, but if they had a child before that then the husband is not obligated to pay any support. Woman's rights in these matters are often not practised due to Muslim women's lack of education toward their rights within the Islamic community. Also, Muslim woman in India are not protected when it comes to monogamous marriages, but Muslim men are, protected under the Indian Penal Code.

The United Nations Human Rights Council (UNHRC) under the International Covenant on Civil and Political Rights (ICPPR) highlighted religious-based personal laws in India's report in 1997. It was informed that the human rights framework towards multiculturalism should be a remedy when addressing clearly biased provisions and practices towards Muslim women in Islamic legal community.

==== Muslim women and education ====
Muslim women are often discriminated against due to their lower achievements within the sphere of education, employment and their general economic position. This is because traditionally Muslim women are discriminatingly excluded from participating within the public and private sector.

== See also ==
- National Human Rights Commission of India
- Freedom Firm
- List of endangered languages in India
- Capital punishment in India
- Terrorism in India
- Crime in India
- Suicide in India
- Environmental issues in India
- Income inequality in India
- Malnutrition in India
- Democracy in India
- Judiciary of India
- Political repression in the Kashmir Region
