= Kinshuk =

Kinshuk may refer to:

== People ==
- Kinshuk (professor)
- Kinshuk Mahajan
- Kinshuk Sen
- Kinshuk Vaidya
- Kingshuk Nag
- Kinshuk Dutta

== Plants ==
- A common name for Butea monosperma
