= Pravin Togadia =

Indian oncologist, activist

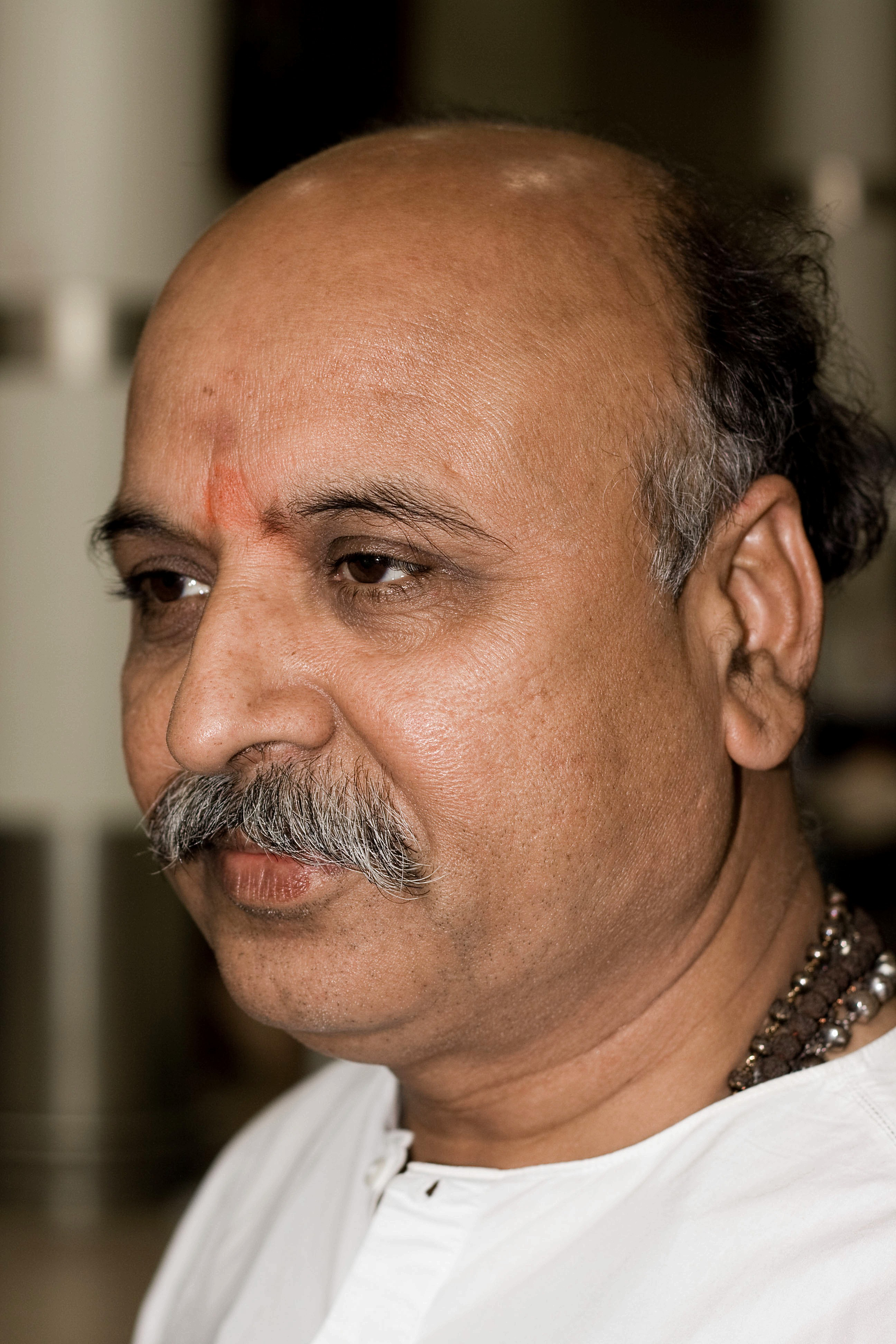
- Pravin Togadia in 2008
- Born: 12 December 1956 (age 69); Sajantimba, Bombay State, India (now in Gujarat, India)
- Citizenship: India
- Occupations: Doctor (Surgeon); Social activist
- Organization: Antarrashtriya Hindu Parishad
- Known for: Social activism among Hindus
- Height: 170 cm (5 ft 7 in)
- Political party: Antarrashtriya Hindu Parishad (President)
- Spouse: Rashmi Togadia
- Children: 2 (1 son and daughter)

Pravin Togadia (Gujarati pronunciation: [Praviṇa tōgaḍiyā]; born 12 December 1956) is an Indian doctor, cancer surgeon and an advocate for Hindu nationalism, from Gujarat. He was the former International Working President of the Vishva Hindu Parishad (VHP) and a cancer surgeon by qualification. He is Founder and Current President of Antarashtriya Hindu Parishad.

== Personal life ==
Togadia (born on 12 December 1956) in a Gujarati family moved to Ahmedabad at age 10 and joined the Rashtriya Swayamsevak Sangh (RSS) soon after. He received a bachelor's degree in medicine (MBBS) followed by a master's degree (MS) in surgical oncology. He practised as a surgeon for fourteen years and established a hospital, Dhanvantri Hospital, in Ahmedabad. He was born in a farmer family and belongs to Patel community.

== Activism ==
Togadia was an RSS swayamsevak in Ahmedabad, and a colleague of Narendra Modi. He was drafted into VHP in 1983 and Modi was drafted into the BJP in 1984. The two remained colleagues during the rise of BJP to power in 1995. When Shankersinh Vaghela fell out with BJP and became a Chief Minister with the help of the Indian National Congress party, he imprisoned Togadia for an alleged assault on BJP politicians. Modi campaigned for his release. Soon afterwards, Togadia was appointed as the General Secretary of the VHP at the national level. However, he continued to be active in Gujarat. Express India credits his legacy in Gujarat for "bearing fruit" in the 2002 Gujarat riots.

When Modi was banished to Delhi by Keshubhai Patel, Togadia provided him support in Gujarat. Modi was eventually installed as the Chief Minister in 2001, with strong support from Togadia. In return for his support, Modi is said to have inducted Gordhan Zadafia, Togadia's "right hand man" in VHP, as the Minister of State for Home. Togadia hailed the Modi Government as the start of the "Hindu Rashtra". In January 2002, he asked Hindus to cut all relations with Muslims. Through Zadafia, Togadia had an inside track into Modi's first government and had a substantial say in the postings of police officers in Gujarat. Some reports say this enabled VHP and Bajrang Dal to orchestrate so-called saffron terror during the 2002 Gujarat riots. But these allegations on Narendra Modi was removed by subsequent courts proceedings. Togadia and VHP/BJP activists also interfered with the treatment of victims in hospitals, telling doctors whom to treat and whom to turn away. Togadia hailed the conduct of the riots as the "Hindutva laboratory" and said that it will be replicated in Delhi. "A Hindu Rashtra can be expected in the next two years... We will change India's history and Pakistan's geography by then," he said. In the December 2002 elections to the Gujarat Assembly, Togadia campaigned for BJP enthusiastically, addressing more than 100 rallies.

After the December 2002 elections, however, Modi dropped Zadafia from his council of ministers, signaling to Togadia that his interference in government would not be welcome. Modi's biographer, Andy Marino, states that while Modi took the blame for the 2002 riots, he was aware of Togadia's and the VHP's culpability. Togadia is reported to have complained after the elections that Modi was receiving all the "credit" for the riots, even though it was his men who carried out the killings. During his second term of office, Modi took action against VHP interests and activists, both out of his own initiative as well as due to pressure from the Supreme Court. Togadia in turn ridiculed Modi's efforts to reach out to Muslims through his sadbhavana initiatives. The influence of Togadia and the VHP in Gujarat fell steeply.

Gordhan Zadaphia subsequently floated a new political party, Mahagujarat Janata Party (MJP) during the 2007 assembly elections in Gujarat, later merged into the Gujarat Parivartan Party (GPP) of former chief minister Keshubhai Patel. During the 2012 assembly elections, Togadia and VHP activists campaigned hard for the Gujarat Parivartan Party against the BJP. Despite all efforts, Zadaphia and his whole team lost the 2012 elections. The VHP support for Zadafia ended up strengthening Narendra Modi's anti-hardline Hindutva image.

In October 2003, Ashok Singhal signalled his retirement due to ill health and Togadia was informally appointed as the leader of VHP. The formal appointment as the International Working President (the top executive position) was made in 2011.

Togadia is frequently noted for making inflammatory speeches and holding trishul deeksha (trident distribution) ceremonies for VHP and Bajrang Dal activists. In April 2010, he launched the Hindu Helpline network, which is reported to have grown to 50 cities by August 2014.

Togadia resigned as international working president of the VHP in April 2018, after a candidate he supported lost an internal election to the post of VHP President. He then launched a new organisation, the Antarrashtriya Hindu Parishad, with a stated commitment to an ideology based on Hindu nationalism. According to the Hindustan Times, sources within the Sangh Parivar stated that Togadia's frequent criticism of Modi and of the Modi government had caused people within the Sangh Parivar to agitate for his removal.

In 2017, Togadia established a helpline, with the stated aim of providing free medical consultation to the poor.

== Controversies ==
Togadia was arrested in April 2003 after distributing tridents to Bajrang Dal activists in Ajmer, in a ceremony termed "trishul deeksha," defying a state government ban. He was released on bail on the condition that he would not distribute tridents. However, he continued to distribute them in other states.

As of August 2013, Togadia had faced 19 criminal cases for making hate speeches, the highest number of such cases for any one in the country. He was arrested in August 2013 from Ayodhya along with other VHP leaders by the Uttar Pradesh Police before the planned 'Chaurasi Kosi Parikrama Yatra' that was banned over fears of communal flareup.

In April 2014, a First Information Report was registered against Togadia in Bhavnagar after an alleged hate speech instructing Hindus to evict Muslims from their neighbourhoods. Since the statements were made in the midst of general elections, when the 'model code of conduct' was in force, the Election Commission directed the district administration to take action. Togadia denied having made such statements and RSS spokesperson Ram Madhav backed him, stating "No swayamsevak thinks on such divisive lines. They think of all people as one. One people, one nation." However, video recordings of his speech were soon aired on television channels. Narendra Modi disapproved the statements on Twitter, calling them "petty statements by those claiming to be BJP's well wishers". In June 2014, a local court ordered the police to submit an 'action taken' report for the case.

== Bibliography ==
- Bunsha, Dionne (2005). Scarred: Experiments With Violence In Gujarat. Penguin Books. ISBN 978-0-14-400076-0.
- Katju, Manjari (2013). Vishva Hindu Parishad and Indian Politics. Orient Blackswan. ISBN 978-81-250-2476-7.
- Kumar, Praveen (2011). Communal Crimes and National Integration: A Socio-Legal Study. Readworthy Publications. ISBN 978-93-5018-040-2.
- Marino, Andy (2014). Narendra Modi: A Political Biography. HarperCollins Publishers India. ISBN 978-93-5136-217-3.
- Nag, Kingshuk (2013). The NaMo Story - A Political Life. Roli Books. ISBN 978-8174369383.
