= R. K. Raghavan =

Indian police chief and diplomat

Indian High Commissioner to Cyprus
- In office 1 November 2017 – 31 October 2019

Director of Central Bureau of Investigation
- In office 4 January 1999 – 1 April 2001
- Preceded by: T. N. Mishra (acting)
- Succeeded by: P. C. Sharma

Personal details
- Born: Raghava Krishnaswamy Raghavan; 3 April 1941 (age 85) Mylapore, Chennai
- Education: University of Madras (BSc, MA); Temple University (MCJ); Karnatak University (PhD)
- Occupation: Former CBI director
- Known for: SIT head in 2002 Gujarat riots
- Awards: Police Medal for Meritorious Service; President’s Police Medal for Distinguished Service

Raghava Krishnaswami Raghavan is a former Indian police chief and diplomat. He was the director of the Central Bureau of Investigation from 4 January 1999 to 30 April 2001. He investigated high profile cases such as the Priyadarshini Mattoo murder case, the 2000 South Africa cricket match fixing, and the 2002 Gujarat riots.

Raghavan was assisted by Ashok Malhotra, a former CBI Deputy Inspector General, and SIT lawyer R. S. Jamuwar, both "outsiders to Gujarat" in the Gujarat riots case. In April 2014, the Supreme Court praised the investigations done by the Special Investigation Team (SIT) headed by Raghavan and declined to re-constitute another. He was appointed as India's High Commissioner to the Republic of Cyprus on 30 August 2017.

== Early life and career ==
Raghavan's family moved to Mylapore, in Madras, Tamil Nadu when he was aged seven. His grandfather C.R. Srinivasa Iyengar was deputy director of the Department of Agriculture. He has an M.A. in Politics and Public Administration from Madras University, an M.S. in Criminal Justice from Temple University, Philadelphia, and a Ph.D. in Political Science. He was a visiting fellow at Rutgers University and the Harvard Law School. He is from 1963 cadre. He was also the director of Tamil Nadu Fire Service. Raghavan is a steadfast devotee of Lord Venkateshwara. Raghavan was the director-general of Tamil Nadu's State Vigilance Directorate for six years from 1993 to 1999, overseeing the corruption cases against AIADMK leader Jayalalithaa. In his 15-year stint with the Intelligence Bureau, he was posted to Shillong, Delhi and Chennai.

Raghavan became the 19th CBI director in 1999, from a panel comprising Andhra Pradesh police chief H.J. Dora and officiating director Trinath Mishra. He headed Interpol in India, and set up India's first cyber crime investigation cell. He was also Corporate Security adviser with Tata Consultancy Services. He was also consulting adviser in O.P. Jindal's Board of Management.

Raghavan later had the SIT constituted by Supreme Court of India to probe 10 riot cases of 2002.

BCCI later asked Raghavan to probe 2013 IPL scandal. He was appointed as India's High commissioner[Ambassador] to cyprus on 30/8/2017

== Awards ==
Raghavan is recipient of Indian Police Medal for Meritorious Service and the President's Police Medal for Distinguished Service.

== Books ==
- Indian Police: Problems, Planning and Perspectives by R. K. Raghavan; Manohar Publications India, 1989.
- Policing a Democracy: A Comparative Study of India & the US by R. K. Raghavan; Manohar Publications India, 1994.
- A Road Well Travelled: An Autobiography by R. K. Raghavan; Westland, 2020.
- Indian Mujahideen: Computational Analysis and Public Policy (Terrorism, Security, and Computation) by V.S. Subrahmanian, Aaron Mannes, Animesh Roul and R.K. Raghavan; Springer, 2013.

== See also ==
- Raju Ramachandran
- Gulbarg Society massacre
- Priyadarshini Mattoo
- Assassination of Rajiv Gandhi
