= Birdhana =

- Village
- Location in Haryana, India Birdhana (India)
- Country: India
- State: Haryana
- Region: North India
- District: Jhajjar

Languages
  - Official: Hindi
- Time zone: UTC+5:30 (IST)
- PIN: 124102
- ISO 3166 code: IN-HR
- Vehicle registration: HR-14
- Website: haryana.gov.in

Birdhana is a village in Jhajjar Mandal, Jhajjar District in Haryana, India.

== Geography ==
Birdhana is 5.6 km (3.5 mi) distance from its Mandal Main Town Jhajjar and 230 km distance from its State Capital Chandigarh.

Nearby villages are Mehrana (2.4km), Gudha (3.1 km), Jondhi (4.4km), Dujana (4 km (2.5 mi)), Chamanpura (4.3 km (2.7 mi)). Nearby towns are Jhajjar (5 km (3.1 mi)), Beri (9.8 km (6.1 mi)), Matannail (21 km (13 mi)), Bahadurgarh. (29.7 km (18.5 mi)m).

== Facilities in the village ==
The village has a co-educational public higher secondary school, a school for middle education and two different schools for boys and girls for primary education. There is a primary health center in the village along with a veterinary hospital for animals. There are eight Anganwadi Centers under the Child Development Scheme.

There are several temples and shrines with a long history: Temple of the Dadi Satti is also there. Baba Haridas Mandir is a holy place in this village. The temple of God Shiva in the village, situated on the bank of Maheshwar lake, is very famous among the locals. It is where the fair is organized twice on the occasion of Shivratri, in which various activities are organized such as wrestling competitions, Kabaddi and other contests.

== Demographics ==
Most of the population is of Dahiya Gotra which comes under the Jat community. Farming is the main occupation.
