= 2002 Gujarat violence =

Sectarian violence in the Indian state

- Part of religious violence in India
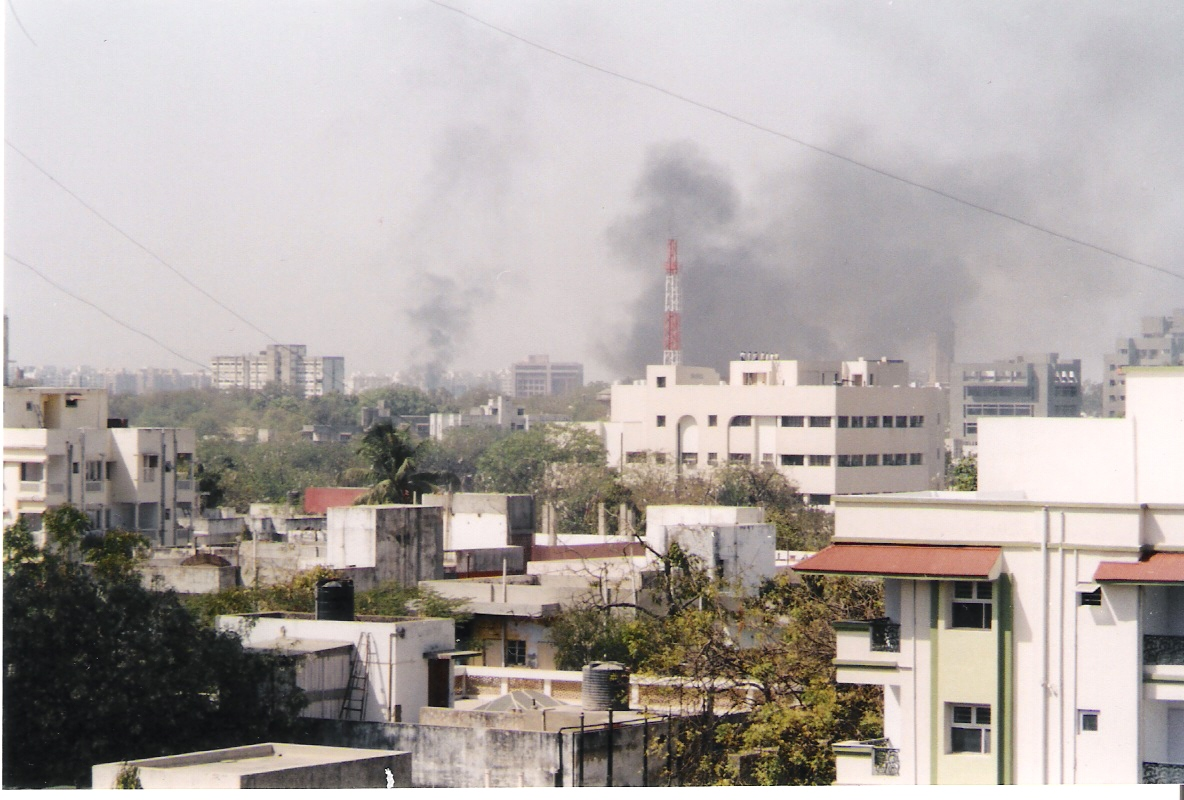
- The skyline of Ahmedabad filled with smoke as buildings and shops are set on fire by rioting mobs.
- Location: Gujarat, India
- Date: February – March 2002
- Target: Muslims in Gujarat
- Attack type: Pogrom, arson, mass rape, kidnapping, mass murder, rioting
- Deaths: Official: 790 Muslims and 254 Hindus; Other sources: 1,926 to 2,000+ total (predominantly Muslims)
- Injuries: 2,500+
- Perpetrators: Rashtriya Swayamsevak Sangh; Vishva Hindu Parishad; Bajrang Dal; Bharatiya Janata Party; Government of Gujarat
- Motive: Revenge for the Godhra train burning; State terrorism; Ethnic cleansing

On 28 February 2002, a three-day period of inter-communal violence began in the western Indian state of Gujarat. The burning of a train in Godhra the day before, which caused the deaths of 58 Hindu pilgrims and karsevaks (religious volunteers) returning from Ayodhya, is cited as having instigated the violence. Following the initial violence, further outbreaks occurred in Ahmedabad for three months; statewide, even further outbreaks of violence against the minority Muslim population of Gujarat continued for the next year.

According to official figures, the riots ended with 1,044 dead, 223 missing, and 2,500 injured. Of the dead, 790 were Muslim and 254 Hindu. The Concerned Citizens Tribunal Report estimated that as many as 1,926 may have been killed. Other sources estimated death tolls in excess of 2,000. In addition to many brutal killings, many rapes were reported, as well as widespread looting and destruction of property. Narendra Modi, then Chief Minister of Gujarat and later Prime Minister of India, was accused of condoning the violence, as were police and government officials who allegedly directed the mob and gave them lists of Muslim-owned properties.

Though officially classified as a communal riot, the events of 2002 have been described as a pogrom by many scholars; some commentators alleged that the attacks had been planned and that the attack on the train was a "staged trigger" to obfuscate what was actually premeditated violence. Instances of mass violence include the Naroda Patiya massacre that took place right next to a police training camp; the Gulbarg Society massacre that killed, among others, Ehsan Jafri, a former parliamentarian; and several incidents in Vadodara city. Scholars studying the 2002 riots state that they were premeditated and constituted a form of ethnic cleansing, and that the state government and law enforcement were complicit in the violence. Observers have stated that these events had met the "legal definition of genocide".

In 2012, Modi was cleared of complicity in the violence by Special Investigation Team (SIT) appointed by the Supreme Court of India. The SIT also rejected claims that the state government had not done enough to prevent the riots. The Muslim community reacted with anger and disbelief. The Supreme Court rejected multiple legal challenges to the SIT report in subsequent years, and in a 2022 decision ended legal proceedings involving Modi and allegations of state complicity. Approximately 600 individuals were accused in cases related to specific incidents: As of 2022, approximately 200 people had been convicted, and 150 had received life sentences, with various appeals pending.

== Godhra train burning ==
On the morning of 27 February 2002, the Sabarmati Express, returning from Ayodhya to Ahmedabad, stopped near the Godhra railway station. The passengers were Hindu pilgrims, returning from Ayodhya. An argument erupted between the train passengers and the vendors on the railway platform. The argument became violent and, under uncertain circumstances, four coaches of the train caught fire with many people trapped inside. In the resulting conflagration, 59 people, including women and children, burned to death.

The government of Gujarat set up Gujarat High Court judge K. G. Shah as a one-man commission to look into the incident, but following outrage among families of victims and in the media over Shah's alleged closeness to Modi, retired Supreme Court judge G.T. Nanavati was added as chairman of the now two-person commission.

In 2003, The Concerned Citizens Tribunal (CCT) (Note: The Concerned Citizen's Tribunal (CCT) was an eight-member committee headed by V. R. Krishna Iyer, retired Judge of Supreme Court, with P. B. Sawant, Hosbet Suresh, K. G. Kannabiran, Aruna Roy, K. S. Subramanian, Ghanshyam Shah and Tanika Sarkar making up the rest. It was appointed by Citizens for Peace and Justice (CPJ), a group formed by some social activists from Mumbai and Ahmedabad. It released its first reports in 2003. CPJ members included Alyque Padamsee, Anil Dharkar, Cyrus Guzder, Ghulam Mohammed, I.M. Kadri, Javed Akhtar, Nandan Maluste, Titoo Ahluwalia, Vijay Tendulkar, Teesta Setalvad, Javed Anand; Indubhai Jani, Uves Sareshwala, Batuk Vora, Fr. Cedric Prakash, Najmal Almelkar.) concluded that the fire had been an accident. Several other independent commentators have also concluded that the fire itself was almost certainly an accident, saying that the initial cause of the conflagration has never been conclusively determined. Historian Ainslie Thomas Embree stated that the official story of the attack on the train (that it was organised and carried out by people under orders from Pakistan) was entirely baseless.

The Union government led by the Indian National Congress party in 2005 also set up a committee to probe the incident, headed up by retired Supreme Court judge Umesh Chandra Banerjee. The committee concluded that the fire had begun inside the train and was most likely accidental. However, the Gujarat High Court ruled in 2006 that the matter was outside the jurisdiction of the union government, and that the committee was therefore unconstitutional.

After six years of going over the details, Nanavati-Mehta Commission submitted its preliminary report which concluded that the fire was an act of arson, committed by a mob of one to two thousand locals. Maulvi Husain Haji Ibrahim Umarji, a cleric in Godhra, and a dismissed Central Reserve Police Force officer named Nanumiyan were presented as the "masterminds" behind the arson. After 24 extensions, the commission submitted its final report on 18 November 2014. The findings of the commission were called into question by a video recording released by Tehelka magazine, which showed Arvind Pandya, counsel for the Gujarat government, stating that the findings of the Shah-Nanavati commission would support the view presented by the Bharatiya Janata Party (BJP), as Shah was "their man" and Nanavati could be bribed.

In February 2011, the trial court convicted 31 people and acquitted 63 others based on the murder and conspiracy provisions of the Indian Penal Code, saying the incident was a "pre-planned conspiracy." Of those convicted, 11 were sentenced to death and the other 20 to life in prison. Maulvi Umarji, presented by the Nanavati-Shah commission as the prime conspirator, was acquitted along with 62 others accused for lack of evidence.

== Post-Godhra violence ==
Location of major incidents.

Following the attack on the train, the Vishva Hindu Parishad (VHP) called for a statewide bandh, or strike. Although the Supreme Court had declared such strikes to be unconstitutional and illegal, and despite the common tendency for such strikes to be followed by violence, no action was taken by the state to prevent the strike. The government did not attempt to stop the initial outbreak of violence across the state. Independent reports indicate that the state BJP president Rana Rajendrasinh had endorsed the strike, and that Modi and Rana used inflammatory language which worsened the situation.

Then-Chief Minister Narendra Modi declared that the attack on the train had been an act of terrorism, and not an incident of communal violence. Local newspapers and members of the state government used the statement to incite violence against the Muslim community by claiming, without proof, that the attack on the train was carried out by Pakistan's intelligence agency and that local Muslims had conspired with them to attack Hindus in the state. False stories were also printed by local newspapers which claimed that Muslim people had kidnapped and raped Hindu women.

Numerous accounts describe the attacks on the Muslim community that began on 28 February (the day after the train fire) as highly coordinated with mobile phones and government-issued printouts listing the homes and businesses of Muslims. Attackers arrived in Muslim communities across the region in trucks, wearing saffron robes and khaki shorts, bearing a variety of weapons. In many cases, attackers damaged or burned Muslim-owned or occupied buildings while leaving adjacent Hindu buildings untouched. Although many calls to the police were made from victims, they were told by the police that "we have no orders to save you." In some cases, the police fired on Muslims who attempted to defend themselves. The rioters used mobile phones to coordinate their attacks. By the end of the day on 28 February a curfew had been declared in 27 towns and cities across the state. A government minister stated that although the circumstances were tense in Baroda and Ahmedabad, the situation was under control, and that the police who had been deployed were enough to prevent any violence. In Baroda, the administration imposed a curfew in seven areas of the city.

M. D. Antani, then the deputy superintendent of police, deployed the Rapid Action Force to sensitive areas in Godhra. Gordhan Zadafia, the Minister of State for Home, believed there would be no retaliation from the Hindu community for the train burning. Modi stated that the violence was no longer as intense as it had been and that it would soon be brought under control, and that if the situation warranted it, the police would be supported by deploying the army. A shoot-to-kill order was issued. However the troop deployment was withheld by the state government until 1 March, when the most severe violence had ended. After more than two months of violence a unanimous vote to authorize central intervention was passed in the upper house of parliament. Members of the opposition made accusations that the government had failed to protect Muslim people in the worst rioting in India in more than 10 years.

It is estimated that 230 mosques and 274 dargahs were destroyed during the violence. For the first time in the history of communal riots Hindu women took part, looting Muslim shops. It is estimated that up to 150,000 people were displaced during the violence. It is estimated that 200 police officers died while trying to control the violence, and Human Rights Watch reported that acts of exceptional heroism were committed by Hindus, Dalits and tribals who tried to protect Muslims from the violence.

== Attacks on Muslims ==
In the aftermath of the violence, it became clear that not only were many attacks focused on Muslim populations, but were conducted with a deliberate emphasis on targeting Muslim women and children. Organisations such as Human Rights Watch criticised the Indian government and the Gujarat state administration for failure to address the resulting humanitarian condition of victims who fled their homes for relief camps during the violence, the "overwhelming majority of them Muslim." According to Teesta Setalvad on 28 February in the districts of Morjari Chowk and Charodia Chowk in Ahmedabad of all forty people who had been killed by police shooting were Muslim. (Note: Teesta Setalvad, "When guardians betray: The role of the police," in Varadarajan 2002, p. 181) An international fact-finding committee formed of all women international experts from US, UK, France, Germany and Sri Lanka reported, "sexual violence was being used as a strategy for terrorizing women belonging to minority community in the state."

It is estimated that at least 250 girls and women were gang raped and then burned to death. Children were force-fed petrol and then set on fire, pregnant women were gutted and then had their unborn child's body shown to them. In the Naroda Patiya mass grave of ninety-six bodies, forty-six were women. Rioters also flooded homes and electrocuted entire families inside. Violence against women also included them being stripped naked, violated with objects, and then killed. According to Kalpana Kannabiran the rapes were part of a well-organised, deliberate and pre-planned strategy, and which facts place the violence into the categories of political pogrom and genocide. Other acts of violence against women included acid attacks, beatings and the killing of women who were pregnant. Children were also killed in front of their parents. George Fernandes in a discussion in parliament on the violence caused widespread furor in his defense of the state government, saying that this was not the first time that women had been violated and raped in India.

Children were killed by being burnt alive and those who dug the mass graves described the bodies interred within them as "burned and butchered beyond recognition." Children and infants were speared and held aloft before being thrown into fires. Describing the sexual violence perpetrated against Muslim women and girls, Renu Khanna writes that the survivors reported that it "consisted of forced nudity, mass rapes, gang-rapes, mutilation, insertion of objects into bodies, cutting of breasts, slitting the stomach and reproductive organs, and carving of Hindu religious symbols on women's body parts." The Concerned Citizens' Tribunal characterised the use of rape "as an instrument for the subjugation and humiliation of a community." Testimony heard by the committee stated that:

A chilling technique, absent in pogroms unleashed hitherto but very much in evidence this time in a large number of cases, was the deliberate destruction of evidence. Barring a few, in most instances of sexual violence, the women victims were stripped and paraded naked, then gang-raped, and thereafter quartered and burnt beyond recognition. ... The leaders of the mobs even raped young girls, some as young as 11 years old ... before burning them alive. ... Even a 20-day-old infant, or a fetus in the womb of its mother, was not spared.

An autopsy report conducted on the deceased women states that the doctor who conducted the post-mortem, found the foetus intact. The doctor, who had conducted the autopsy said to the court that the foetus was intact in the woman's womb.

Vandana Shiva stated that "Young boys have been taught to burn, rape and kill in the name of Hindutva."

Dionne Bunsha, writing on the Gulbarg Society massacre and murder of Ehsan Jafri, has said that when Jafri begged the crowd to spare the women, he was dragged into the street and forced to parade naked for refusing to say "Jai Shri Ram." He was then beheaded and thrown onto a fire, after which rioters returned and burned Jafri's family, including two small boys, to death. After the massacre Gulbarg remained in flames for a week.

== Attacks on Hindus ==
The Times of India reported that over ten thousand Hindus were displaced during the violence. According to police records, 157 riots after the Godhra incident were started by Muslims. In Mahajan No Vando, a Hindu residential area in Jamalpur, residents reported that Muslim attackers injured approximately twenty-five Hindu residents and destroyed five houses on 1 March. The community head reported that the police responded quickly, but were ineffectual as there were so few of them present to help during the attack. The colony was later visited by Modi on 6 March, who promised the residents that they would be taken care of.

On 17 March, it was reported that Muslims attacked Dalits in the Danilimda area of Ahmedabad. In Himatnagar, a man was reportedly found dead with both his eyes gouged out. The Sindhi Market and Bhanderi Pole areas of Ahmedabad were also reportedly attacked by mobs.

India Today reported on 20 May 2002 that there were sporadic attacks on Hindus in Ahmedabad. On 5 May, Muslim rioters attacked Bhilwas locality in the Shah Alam area. Hindu doctors were asked to stop practicing in Muslim areas after one Hindu doctor was stabbed.

Frontline magazine reported that in Ahmedabad of the 249 bodies recovered by 5 March, thirty were Hindu. Of the Hindus that had been killed, thirteen had died as a result of police action and several others had died while attacking Muslim owned properties. Despite the relatively few attacks by Muslim mobs on Hindu neighbourhoods, twenty-four Muslims were reported to have died in police shootings. (Note: Nandini Sundar, "A licene to kill: Patterns of violence in Gujarat", in Varadarajan 2002, p. 83)

== Media coverage ==
The events in Gujarat were the first instance of communal violence in India in the age of 24-hour news coverage and were televised worldwide. This coverage played a central role in the politics of the situation. Media coverage was generally critical of the Hindu right; however, the BJP portrayed the coverage as an assault on the honor of Gujaratis and turned the hostility into an emotive part of their electoral campaign. With the violence receding in April, a peace meeting was arranged at Sabarmati Ashram, a former home of Mahatma Gandhi. Hindutva supporters and police officers attacked almost a dozen journalists. The state government banned television news channels critical of the government's response, and local stations were blocked. Two reporters working for STAR News were assaulted several times while covering the violence. On a return trip from having interviewed Modi when their car was surrounded by a crowd, one of the crowd claimed that they would be killed should they be a member of a minority community.

The Editors Guild of India, in its report on media ethics and coverage on the incidents stated that the news coverage was exemplary, with only a few minor lapses. The local newspapers Sandesh and Gujarat Samachar, however, were heavily criticised. (Note: Siddharth Varadarajan and Rajdeep Sardesai, "The truth hurts: Gujarat and the role of the media", in Varadarajan 2002, p. 272) The report states that Sandesh had headlines which would "provoke, communalize and terrorize" people. The newspaper also used a quote from a VHP leader as a headline, "Avenge with blood." The report stated that Gujarat Samachar had played a role in increasing the tensions but did not give all of its coverage over to "hawkish and inflammatory reportage in the first few weeks". The paper carried reports to highlight communal harmony. Gujarat Today was given praise for showing restraint and for the balanced reportage of the violence. Critical reporting on the Gujarat government's handling of the situation helped bring about the Indian government's intervention in controlling the violence. The Editors Guild rejected the charge that graphic news coverage aggravated the situation, saying that the coverage exposed the "horrors" of the riots as well as the "supine if not complicit" attitude of the state, helping to propel remedial action.

== Allegations of state complicity ==
Many scholars and commentators have accused the state government of being complicit in the attacks, either in failing to exert any effort to quell the violence or for actively planning and executing the attacks themselves. The United States Department of State ultimately banned Narendra Modi from travelling to the US due to his alleged role in the attacks. These allegations center around several ideas. First, the state did little to quell the violence, with attacks continuing well through the Spring. The historian Gyanendra Pandey described these attacks as state terrorism, saying that they were not riots but "organised political massacres." According to Paul Brass the only conclusion from the evidence which is available points to the methodical coordination of an anti-Muslim pogrom which was carried out with exceptional brutality.

The media has described the attacks as state terrorism rather than "communal riots" due to the lack of state intervention. Many politicians downplayed the incidents, claiming that the situation was under control. One minister who spoke with Rediff.com stated that though the circumstances were tense in Baroda and Ahmedabad, the situation was under control, and that the police who had been deployed were enough to prevent any violence. The deputy superintendent of police stated that the Rapid Action Force had been deployed to sensitive areas in Godhra. Gordhan Zadafia, the Minister of State for Home, stated that he believed there would be no retaliation from the Hindu community. Once troops were airlifted in on 1 March, Modi stated that the violence was no longer as intense as it had been and that it would soon be brought under control. The violence continued for 3 months with no intervention from the federal government until May. Local and state-level politicians were seen leading violent mobs, restraining the police and arranging the distribution of weapons, leading investigative reports to conclude that the violence was "engineered and launched."

Throughout the violence, attacks were made in full view of police stations and police officers who did not intervene. In many instances, police joined the mobs in perpetrating violence. At one Muslim locality, of the twenty-nine deaths, sixteen were caused by police firing into the locality. Some rioters even had printouts of voter registration lists, allowing them to selectively target Muslim properties. Selective targeting of properties was shown by the destruction of the offices of the Muslim Wakf board which was located within the confines of the high security zone and just 500 meters from the office of the chief minister.

The violence had been planned far in advance, and that similar to other instances of communal violence the Bajrang Dal, the VHP and the Rashtriya Swayamsevak Sangh (RSS) all took part in the attacks. Following the attack on the train the VHP called for a statewide bandh (strike), and the state took no action to prevent this.

The Concerned Citizens Tribunal (CCT) report includes testimony of the then Gujarat BJP minister Haren Pandya (since murdered), who testified about an evening meeting convened by Modi the evening of the train burning. At this meeting, officials were instructed not to obstruct the Hindu rage following the incident. The report also highlighted a second meeting, held in Lunawada village of Panchmahal district, attended by state ministers Ashok Bhatt, and Prabhatsinh Chauhan, among other BJP and RSS leaders, where "detailed plans were made on the use of kerosene and petrol for arson and other methods of killing." The Jamiat Ulama-i-Hind claimed in 2002 that some regional Congress workers collaborated with the perpetrators of the violence.

Dipankar Gupta believes that the state and police were clearly complicit in the violence, but that some officers were outstanding in the performance of their duties, such as Himanshu Bhatt and Rahul Sharma. Sharma was reported to have said "I don't think any other job would have allowed me to save so many lives." Human Rights Watch has reported on acts of exceptional heroism by Hindus, Dalits and tribals who tried to protect Muslims from the violence.

In response to allegations of state involvement, Gujarat government spokesman, Bharat Pandya, told the BBC that the rioting was a spontaneous Hindu backlash fueled by widespread anger against Muslims. He said "Hindus are frustrated over the role of Muslims in the on-going violence in Indian-administered Kashmir and other parts of India." In support of this, the US Ambassador at-large for International Religious Freedom, John Hanford, expressed concern over religious intolerance in Indian politics and said that while the rioters may have been aided by state and local officials, he did not believe that the BJP-led central government was involved in inciting the riots.

== Criminal prosecutions ==
Prosecution of the perpetrators of the violence hampered by witnesses being bribed or intimidated and the perpetrators' names being deleted from the charge sheets. Local judges were also biased. After more than two years of acquittals, the Supreme Court of India stepped in, transferring key cases to the Bombay High Court and ordering the police to reopen two thousand cases that had been previously closed. The Supreme Court also lambasted the Gujarat government as "modern day Neros" who looked elsewhere when innocent women and children were burning and then interfered with prosecution. Following this direction, police identified nearly 1,600 cases for re-investigation, arrested 640 accused and launched investigations against forty police officers for their failures. (Note: Human Rights Watch alleged that state and law enforcement officials were harassing and intimidating key witnesses, NGOs, social activists and lawyers who were fighting to seek justice for riot victims. In its 2003 annual report, Amnesty International stated, "the same police force that was accused of colluding with the attackers was put in charge of the investigations into the massacres, undermining the process of delivery of justice to the victims.")

In March 2008, the Supreme Court ordered the setting up of a Special Investigation Team (SIT) to reinvestigate the Godhra train burning case and key cases of post-Godhra violence. The former CBI Director R. K. Raghavan was appointed to chair the Team. Christophe Jaffrelot notes that the SIT was not as independent as commonly believed. Other than Raghavan, half of the six members of the team were recruited from the Gujarat police, and the Gujarat High Court was still responsible for appointing judicial officers. The SIT made efforts to appoint independent prosecutors but some of them resigned due to their inability to function. No efforts were made to protect the witnesses and Raghavan himself was said to be an "absentee investigator," who spent only a few days every month in Gujarat, with the investigations being conducted by the remainder of the team.

As of April 2013, 249 convictions had been secured of 184 Hindus and 65 Muslims. Thirty-one of the Muslim convictions were for the massacre of Hindus in Godhra.

=== Best Bakery case ===
The Best Bakery murder trial received wide attention after witnesses retracted testimony in court and all of the accused were acquitted. The Indian Supreme Court, acting on a petition by social activist Teesta Setalvad, ordered a retrial outside Gujarat in which nine accused were found guilty in 2006. A key witness, Zaheera Sheikh, who repeatedly changed her testimony during the trials and the petition was found guilty of perjury.

=== British citizens' murder case ===
Six people were charged with burning alive three British tourists: Saeed Dawood, Shakil Dawood, Mohammad Aswat. However, in 2015 all the accused were acquitted due to a lack of evidence.

=== Bilkis Bano case ===
During the Gujarat riots, a pregnant woman named Bilkis Bano was gang-raped and numerous members of her family were killed. After police dismissed the case against her assailants, she approached the National Human Rights Commission of India and petitioned the Supreme Court seeking a reinvestigation.

The Supreme Court granted the motion, directing the Central Bureau of Investigation (CBI) to take over the investigation. CBI appointed a team of experts from the Central Forensic Science Laboratory (CFSL) Delhi and All India Institute of Medical Sciences (AIIMS) under the guidance and leadership of Professor T. D. Dogra to exhume the mass graves to establish the identity and cause of death of the victims. The team successfully located and exhumed the remains of the victims.

The trial of the case was transferred out of Gujarat and the central government was directed to appoint a public prosecutor. Charges were filed in a Mumbai court against nineteen people as well as six police officials and a government doctor over their role in the initial investigations. In January 2008, eleven men were sentenced to life imprisonment for rapes and murders and a policeman was convicted of falsifying evidence. The Mumbai High Court upheld the life imprisonment of the eleven men convicted for the gang rape of Bilkis Bano and the murder of her family members on 8 May 2017.

On 15 August 2022, the Gujarat government released the eleven men sentenced to life imprisonment in the case. The judge who sentenced the rapists said the early release set a bad precedent by the Gujarat government and warned that the move would have wide ramifications.

The panel which granted remission included two legislators from the BJP, which was the state government at that time, former BJP Godhra municipal councillor, and a BJP women wing member. A BJP MLA, one of the panellists, has said that some of the convicts are "Brahmins" with good 'sanskaar' or values. After being released from the jail, they were welcomed with sweets and their feet touched in respect.

On 8 January 2024, Supreme Court of India ruled that the Gujarat government was not competent to grant remission and struck down the relief granted, in August 2022, to the 11 men who were sentenced to life imprisonment. The court ordered the 11 men to surrender to the jail authorities within 15 days.

=== Avdhootnagar case ===
In 2005, the Vadodara fast-track court acquitted 108 people accused of murdering two youths during a mob attack on a group of displaced Muslims returning under police escort to their homes in Avdhootnagar. The court passed strictures against the police for failing to protect the people under their escort and failing to identify the attackers they had seen.

=== Danilimda case ===
Nine people were convicted of killing a Hindu man and injuring another during group clashes in Danilimda, Ahmedabad on 12 April 2005, while twenty-five others were acquitted.

=== Eral case ===
Eight people, including a VHP leader and a member of the BJP, were convicted for the murder of seven members of a family and the rape of two minor girls in the village of Eral in Panchmahal district.

=== Pavagadh and Dhikva case ===
Fifty-two people from Pavagadh and Dhikva villages in Panchmahal district were acquitted of rioting charges for lack of evidence.

=== Godhra train-burning case ===
A stringent anti-terror law, the POTA, was used by the Gujarat government to charge 131 people in connection to the Godhra train fire, but not invoked in prosecuting any of the accused in the post-Godhra riots. In 2005 the POTA Review Committee set up by the central government to review the application of the law opined that the Godhra accused should not have been tried under the provisions of POTA.

In February 2011 a special fast track court convicted thirty-one Muslims for the Godhra train burning incident and the conspiracy for the crime

=== Dipda Darwaza case ===
On 9 November 2011, a court in Ahmedabad sentenced thirty-one Hindus to life imprisonment for murdering dozens of Muslims by burning a building in which they took shelter. Forty-one other Hindus were acquitted of murder charges due to a lack of evidence. Twenty-two further people were convicted for attempted murder on 30 July 2012, while sixty-one others were acquitted.

=== Naroda Patiya massacre ===
On 29 July 2012, an Indian court convicted thirty people in the Naroda Patiya massacre case for their involvement in the attacks. The convicted included former state minister Maya Kodnani and Bajrang Dal activist Babu Bajrangi. The court case began in 2009, and over three hundred people (including victims, witnesses, doctors, and journalists) testified before the court. For the first time, the verdict acknowledged the role of a politician in inciting Hindu mobs. Activists asserted that the verdict would embolden the opponent of Narendra Modi, the then chief minister of Gujarat, in the crucial run-up to state elections later that year, when Modi would be seeking a third term (The BJP and he eventually went on to win the elections). Modi refused to apologise and denied that the government had a role in the riots. Twenty-nine people were acquitted during the verdict. Teesta Setalvad said "For the first time, this judgment actually goes beyond neighborhood perpetrators and goes up to the political conspiracy. The fact that convictions have gone that high means the conspiracy charge has been accepted and the political influencing of the mobs has been accepted by the judge. This is a huge victory for justice."

=== Perjury cases ===
In April 2009, the SIT submitted before the Court that Teesta Setalvad had cooked up cases of violence to spice up the incidents. The SIT which is headed by former CBI director, R. K. Raghavan has said that false witnesses were tutored to give evidence about imaginary incidents by Setalvad and other NGOs. The SIT charged her of "cooking up macabre tales of killings."

The court was told that twenty-two witnesses, who had submitted identical affidavits before various courts relating to riot incidents, were questioned by SIT and it was found that the witnesses had not actually witnessed the incidents and they were tutored and the affidavits were handed over to them by Setalvad.

== Inquiries ==
There were more than sixty investigations by national and international bodies many of which concluded that the violence was supported by state officials. A report from the National Human Rights Commission of India (NHRC) stated that res ipsa loquitur applied as the state had comprehensively failed to protect uphold the rights of the people as set out in the Constitution of India. It faulted the Gujarat government for failure of intelligence, failure to take appropriate action, and failure to identify local factors and players. NHRC also expressed "widespread lack of faith" in the integrity of the investigation of major incidents of violence. It recommended that five critical cases should be transferred to the Central Bureau of Investigation (CBI).

The US State Department's International Religious Freedom Report quoted the NHRC as concluding that the attacks had been premeditated, that state government officials were complicit, and that there was evidence of police not acting during the assaults on Muslims. The US State Department also cited how Gujarat's high school textbooks described Hitler's "charismatic personality" and the "achievements of Nazism." US Congressmen John Conyers and Joe Pitts subsequently introduced a resolution in the House condemning the conduct of Modi for inciting religious persecution. They stated that Modi's government had a role in "promoting the attitudes of racial supremacy, racial hatred and the legacy of Nazism through his government's support of school textbooks in which Nazism is glorified." They also wrote a letter to the US State Department asking it deny Modi a visa to the United States. The resolution was not adopted.

The CCT consisting of eminent high court judges released a detailed three-volume report on the riots. Headed by retired Supreme Court Justice V. R. Krishna Iyer, the CCT released its findings in 2003 and stated that, contrary to the government allegation of a conspiracy in Godhra, the incident had not been pre-planned and there was no evidence to indicate otherwise. On the statewide riots, the CCT reported that, several days before the Godhra incident, which was the excuse used for the attacks, homes belonging to Hindus in Muslim areas had been marked with pictures of Hindu deities or saffron flags, and that this had been done to prevent any accidental assaults on Hindu homes or businesses. The CCT investigation also discovered evidence that the VHP and the Bajrang Dal had training camps in which people were taught to view Muslims as an enemy. These camps were backed and supported by the BJP and RSS. They also reported that "The complicity of the state government is obvious. And, the support of the central government to the state government in all that it did is also by now a matter of common knowledge."

The state government commissioned J. G. Shah to conduct, what became, a controversial one man inquiry into the Godhra incident, its credibility was questioned and the NHRC and the National Minorities Commission requested that a sitting judge from the supreme court be appointed. The supreme court overturned the findings by Shah stating, "this judgement is not based on the understanding of any evidence, but on imagination."

Early in 2003, the state government of Gujarat set up the Nanavati-Shah commission to investigate the entire incident, from the initial one at Godhra to the ensuing violence. The commission was caught up in controversy from the beginning. Activists and members of the opposition insisted on a judicial commission to be set up and headed by a sitting judge rather than a retired one from the high court. The state government refused. Within a few months Nanavati, before hearing any testimony declared there was no evidence of lapses by either the police or government in their handling of the violence. In 2008 Shah died and was replaced by Justice Akshay Mehta, another retired high court judge. Metha's appointment was controversial as he was the judge who allowed Babu Bajrangi, a prime suspect in the massacre Naroda Patiya massacre, to be released on bail. In July 2013 the commission was given its 20th extension, and Mukul Sinha of the civil rights group Jan Sangharsh Manch said of the delays "I think the Commission has lost its significance and it now seems to be awaiting the outcome of the 2014 Lok Sabha election." In 2007 Tehelka in an undercover operation had said that the Nanavati-Shah commission had relied on "manufactured evidence." Tehelka editor Tarun Tejpal has claimed that they had taped witnesses who stated they had given false testimony after they had been bribed by the Gujarati police force. Tehelka also recorded Ranjitsinh Patel where he stated that he and Prabhatsinh Patel had been paid fifty thousand rupees each to amend earlier statements and to identify some Muslims as conspirators. According to B G Verghese, the Tehelka expose was far too detailed to have been fake.

A fact finding mission by the Sahmat organisation led by Dr. Kamal Mitra Chenoy concluded that the violence was more akin to ethnic cleansing or a pogrom rather than communal violence. The report said that the violence surpassed other periods of communal violence such as in 1969, 1985, 1989, and 1992 not only in the total loss of life, but also in the savagery of the attacks.

== Aftermath ==
=== Rioting in Gujarat ===
There was widespread destruction of property. 273 dargahs, 241 mosques, 19 temples, and 3 churches were either destroyed or damaged. It is estimated that Muslim property losses were "100,000 houses, 1,100 hotels, 15,000 businesses, 3,000 handcarts and 5,000 vehicles." Overall, 27,780 people were arrested. Of them, 11,167 were arrested for criminal behavior (3,269 Muslim, 7,896 Hindu) and 16,615 were arrested as a preventive measure (2,811 Muslim, 13,804 Hindu). The CCT tribunal reported that 90 percent of those arrested were almost immediately granted bail, even if they had been arrested on suspicion of murder or arson. There were also media reports that political leaders gave those being released public welcomes. This contradicts the state government's statement during the violence that: "Bail applications of all accused persons are being strongly defended and rejected."

=== Police transfers ===
According to R. B. Sreekumar, police officers who followed the rule of law and helped prevent the riots from spreading were punished by the Modi government. They were subjected to disciplinary proceedings and transfers with some having to leave the state. Sreekumar also claims it is common practice to intimidate whistleblowers and otherwise subvert the justice system, and that the state government issued "unconstitutional directives", with officials asking him to kill Muslims involved in rioting or disrupting a Hindu religious event. The Gujarat government denied his allegations, claiming that they were "baseless" and based on malice because Sreekumar had not been promoted.

=== Further violence promotion by extremist groups ===
Following the violence Bal Thackeray, then leader of the Hindutva group Shiv Sena, said "Muslims are a cancer to this country. Cancer is an incurable disease. Its only cure is operation. O Hindus, take weapons in your hands and remove this cancer from your roots." Pravin Togadia, international president of the Vishva Hindu Parishad (VHP), said "All Hindutva opponents will get the death sentence" and Ashok Singhal, the then president of the VHP, has said that the violence in Gujarat was a "successful experiment" which would be repeated nationwide.

The militant group Indian Mujahideen have carried out attacks in revenge and to also act as a deterrent against further instances of mass violence against Muslims. They also claimed to have carried out the 2008 Delhi bombings in revenge for mistreatment of Muslims, referencing the destruction of the Babri Mosque and the violence in Gujarat 2002. In September 2002 there was an attack on the Hindu temple of Akshardham, gunmen carried letters on their persons which suggested that it was a revenge attack for the violence that Muslims had undergone. In August 2002 Shahid Ahmad Bakshi, an operative for the militant group Lashkar-e-Toiba planned to assassinate Modi, Pravin Togadia of the VHP, and other members of the right wing nationalist movement to avenge the 2002 Gujarat violence.

Human Rights Watch has accused the state of orchestrating a cover-up of their role in the violence. Human rights activists and Indian solicitors have urged that legislation be passed so that "communal violence is treated as genocide." Following the violence thousands of Muslims were fired from their places of work, and those who tried to return home had to endure an economic and social boycott.

=== Organisational changes and political reactions ===
On 3 May 2002, former Punjab police chief Kanwar Pal Singh Gill was appointed as security adviser to Modi. Defending the Modi administration in the Rajya Sabha against charges of genocide, BJP spokesman V. K. Malhotra said that the official toll of 254 Hindus, killed mostly by police fire, indicates how the state authorities took effective steps to curb the violence. Opposition parties and three coalition partners of the BJP-led central government demanded the dismissal of Modi for failing to contain the violence, with some calling for the removal of Union Home Minister L. K. Advani as well.

On 18 July, Modi asked the Governor of Gujarat to dissolve the state assembly and call fresh elections. The Indian Election Commission ruled out early elections citing the prevailing law and order situation and held them in December 2002. The BJP capitalised on the violence using posters and videotapes of the Godhra incident and painting Muslims as terrorists. The party gained in all the constituencies affected by the communal violence and a number of candidates implicated in the violence were elected, which in turn ensured freedom from prosecution.

=== Media investigation ===
In 2004, the weekly magazine Tehelka published a hidden camera exposé alleging that BJP legislator Madhu Srivastava bribed Zaheera Sheikh, a witness in the Best Bakery case. Srivastava denied the allegation, and an inquiry committee appointed by the Supreme Court drew an "adverse inference" from the video footage, though it failed to uncover evidence that money was actually paid. In a 2007 expose, the magazine released hidden camera footage of several members of the BJP, VHP and the Bajrang Dal admitting their role in the riots. Among those featured in the tapes was the special counsel representing the Gujarat government before the Nanavati-Shah Commission, Arvind Pandya, who resigned from his post after the release. While the report was criticised by some as being politically motivated, some newspapers said the revelations simply reinforced what was common knowledge. However, the report contradicted official records with regard to Modi's alleged visit to Naroda Patiya and a local police superintendent's location. The Gujarat government blocked telecast of cable news channels broadcasting the expose, a move strongly condemned by the Editors Guild of India.

Taking a stand decried by the media and other rights groups, Nafisa Hussain, a member of the National Commission for Women accused organisations and the media of needlessly exaggerating the plight of women victims of the riots, which was strongly disputed as Gujarat did not have a State Commission for Women to act on the ground. The newspaper Tribune reported that "The National Commission for Women has reluctantly agreed to the complicity of Gujarat Government in the communal violence in the state." The tone of their most recent report was reported by the Tribune as "lenient".

=== Special Investigation Team ===
In April 2012, the three-member SIT formed in 2008 by the Supreme Court as a response to a petition by one of the aggrieved in the Gulmerg massacre absolved Modi of any involvement in the Gulberg massacre, arguably the worst episode of the riots.

In his report, Raju Ramachandran, the amicus curiae for the case, strongly disagreed with a key conclusion of R. K. Raghavan who led SIT: that IPS officer Sanjiv Bhatt was not present at a late-night meeting of top Gujarat cops held at the Chief Minister's residence in the wake of 27 February 2002 Godhra carnage. It has been Bhatt's claim—made in an affidavit before the apex court and in statements to the SIT and the amicus—that he was present at the meeting where Modi allegedly said Hindus must be allowed to carry out retaliatory violence against Muslims. Ramachandran was of the opinion that Modi could be prosecuted for alleged statements he had made. He said there was no clinching material available in the pre-trial stage to disbelieve Bhatt, whose claim could be tested only in court. "Hence, it cannot be said, at this stage, that Shri Bhatt should be disbelieved and no further proceedings should be taken against Shri Modi."

Further, R. K. Shah, the public prosecutor in the Gulbarg Society massacre, resigned because he found it impossible to work with the SIT and further stated that "Here I am collecting witnesses who know something about a gruesome case in which so many people, mostly women and children huddled in Jafri's house, were killed and I get no cooperation. The SIT officers are unsympathetic towards witnesses, they try to browbeat them and don't share evidence with the prosecution as they are supposed to do." Teesta Setalvad referred to the stark inequalities between the SIT team's lawyers who are paid 9 lakh (900,000) rupees per day and the government prosecutors who are paid a pittance. SIT officers have been paid Rs. 1.5 lakh (150,000) per month for their participation in the SIT since 2008.

== Diplomatic ban ==
Modi's failure to stop anti-Muslim violence led to a de facto travel ban imposed by the United Kingdom, United States, and several European nations, as well as the boycott of his provincial government by all but the most junior officials. In 2005, Modi was refused a US visa as someone held responsible for a serious violation of religious freedom. Modi had been invited to the US to speak before the Asian-American Hotel Owners Association. A petition was set up by Coalition Against Genocide led by Angana Chatterji and signed by 125 academics requesting that Modi be refused a diplomatic visa.

Hindu groups in the US also protested and planned to demonstrate in cities in Florida. A resolution was submitted by John Conyers and Joseph R. Pitts in the House of Representatives which condemned Modi for inciting religious persecution. Pitts also wrote to then United States Secretary of State Condoleezza Rice requesting Modi be refused a visa. On 19 March Modi was denied a diplomatic visa and his tourist visa was revoked.

As Modi rose to prominence in India, the UK and the EU lifted their bans in October 2012 and March 2013, respectively, and after his election as prime minister he was invited to Washington, in the US.

== Relief efforts ==
By 27 March 2002, nearly one-hundred thousand displaced people moved into 101 relief camps. This swelled to over 150,000 in 104 camps the next two weeks. The camps were run by community groups and NGOs, with the government committing to provide amenities and supplementary services. Drinking water, medical help, clothing and blankets were in short supply at the camps. At least another 100 camps were denied government support, according to a camp organiser, and relief supplies were prevented from reaching some camps due to fears that they may be carrying arms.

Reactions to the relief effort were further critical of the Gujarat government. Relief camp organisers alleged that the state government was coercing refugees to leave relief camps, with twenty-five thousand people made to leave eighteen camps which were shut down. Following government assurances that further camps would not be shut down, the Gujarat High Court bench ordered that camp organizers be given a supervisory role to ensure that assurances were met.

On 9 September 2002, Modi mentioned during a speech that he was against running relief camps. In January 2010, the Supreme Court ordered the government to hand over the speech and other documents to the SIT.

What brother, should we run relief camps? Should I start children-producing centres there? We want to achieve progress by pursuing the policy of family planning with determination. Ame paanch, Amara pachhees! (we are five and we have twenty-five) ... Can't Gujarat implement family planning? Whose inhibitions are coming in our way? Which religious sect is coming in the way?"

On 23 May 2008, the Union Government announced a 3.2 billion rupee (US$80 million) relief package for the victims of the riots. In contrast, Amnesty International's annual report on India in 2003 claimed the "Gujarat government did not actively fulfill its duty to provide appropriate relief and rehabilitation to the survivors". The Gujarat government initially offered compensation payments of 200,000 rupees to the families of those who died in the Godhra train fire and 100,000 rupees to the families of those who died in the subsequent riots, which local Muslims took to be discriminatory.

== Media suppression ==
In January 2023, the BBC aired a documentary titled India: The Modi Question that probed Prime Minister Narendra Modi's role in the 2002 riots. The Indian government responded to the airing by attempting to block links to the documentary on YouTube and Twitter using provisions of the controversial Information Technology Rules, 2021. In February, several weeks after the ban, the Indian tax authorities raided the British media group's local offices, seizing employees' laptops and mobile phones. Reporters Without Borders denounced the actions as "attempts to clamp down on independent media", noting that the raids had "all the appearance of a reprisal against the BBC for releasing a documentary critical of Prime Minister Narendra Modi".

== In popular culture ==
- Final Solution is a 2003 documentary directed by Rakesh Sharma about the 2002 Gujarat violence. The film was denied entry to Mumbai International Film Festival in 2004 due to objections by Censor Board of India, but won two awards at the 54th Berlin International Film Festival 2004. The ban was later lifted in October 2004.
- Passengers: A Video Journey in Gujarat is a 2003 documentary film co-directed by Akanksha Damini Joshi. It is a critically acclaimed 52-minute long film that narrates the journey of a Hindu and a Muslim family during and after the violence. The politics of division is experienced intimately through the lives two families in Ahmedabad. The film, completed in 2003, has been screened at the 9th Open Frame Festival, Artivist Film Festival, USA, Films for Freedom, Delhi, the World Social Forum 2004, Madurai International Documentary and Short Film Festival and Persistence Resistance, New Delhi.
- Gujarati play Dost Chokkas Ahin Ek Nagar Vastu Hatu by Saumya Joshi is a black comedy-based on 2002 riots.
- Parzania is a 2007 drama film set after the violence and looks at the aftermath of the riots. It is based on the true story of a ten-year-old Parsi boy, Azhar Mody. Rahul Dholakia won the Golden Lotus National Film Award for Best Direction and Sarika won the Silver Lotus National Film Award for Best Actress.
- T. V. Chandran made a trilogy of Malayalam films based on the aftermaths of the Gujarat riots. The trilogy consists of Kathavasheshan (2004), Vilapangalkkappuram (2008) and Bhoomiyude Avakashikal (2012). The narrative of all these films begin on the same day, 28 February 2002, that is, on the day after the Godhra train burning.
- Firaaq is a 2008 political thriller film set one month after the violence and looks at the aftermath in its effects on the lives of everyday people.
- Mausam is a 2011 romantic drama film directed by Pankaj Kapoor, spanned over the period between 1992 and 2002 covering major events.
- Kai Po Che! is a 2013 Hindi film which depicted riots in its plot.
- India: The Modi Question is a 2023 two-part documentary aired by the BBC.
- Modi: Journey of a Common Man (season 2) is 2020 biographical web series on Modi depicting the events of Godhra riots.
- L2: Empuraan is a 2025 Malayalam movie which is loosely based on the 2002 riots. One of the antagonistic characters in the film is named "Baba Bajrangi", which some viewers have interpreted as an allusion to Bajrang Dal leader Babu Bajrangi, a convicted figure involved in the 2002 Gujarat riots who was sentenced to life imprisonment for masterminding the Naroda Patiya massacre.

== See also ==
- Violence against Muslims in India
- Persecution of Hindus
- 1969 Gujarat riots
- 1985 Gujarat riots
- 2006 Vadodara riots
- Religious violence in India
- Gujarat Files: Anatomy of a Cover Up, Rana Ayyub's investigative book on the riots
- List of massacres in India
- India: The Modi Question – a 2023 two-part documentary series aired by BBC Two about the Indian Prime Minister Narendra Modi

== Bibliography ==
- Brass, Paul R. (2005). The Production of Hindu–Muslim Violence in Contemporary India. University of Washington Press. p. 388. ISBN 978-0-295-98506-0.
- Bunsha, Dionne (2005). Scarred: Experiments with Violence in Gujarat. Penguin. ISBN 978-0-14-400076-0.
- Engineer, Asgharali (2003). The Gujarat Carnage. Orient Blackswan. ISBN 978-81-250-2496-5.
- Ghassem-Fachandi, Parvis (2012). Pogrom in Gujarat: Hindu Nationalism and Anti-Muslim Violence in India (PDF). Princeton University Press. ISBN 978-0-691-15177-9.
- Guha, Ramachandra (2002). Gujarat, the making of a tragedy. India: Penguin Books. ISBN 978-0-14-302901-4.
- Jaffrelot, Christophe (2011). Religion, Caste, and Politics in India. C Hurst & Co. ISBN 978-1849041386.
- Kishwar, Madhu Purnima (2014). Modi, Muslims and Media: Voices from Narendra Modi's Gujarat. Manushi Publications. ISBN 978-81-929352-0-1.
- Marino, Andy (2014). Narendra Modi: A Political Biography. HarperCollins Publishers India. ISBN 978-93-5136-217-3.
- Mitta, Manoj (2014). The Fiction of Fact-Finding: Modi & Godhra. HarperCollins Publishers India. ISBN 978-93-5029-187-0.
- Nussbaum, Martha Craven (2008). The Clash Within: Democracy, Religious Violence, and India's Future. Harvard University Press. ISBN 978-0-674-03059-6.
- Oommen, T. K. (2008). Reconciliation in Post-Godhra Gujarat: The Role of Civil Society. Pearson Education India. ISBN 978-81-317-1546-8.
- Shani, Ornit (2007). Communalism, Caste and Hindu Nationalism: The Violence in Gujarat. Cambridge University Press. ISBN 978-0-521-72753-2.
- Simpson, Edward (2009). Muslim Society and the Western Indian Ocean: The Seafarers of Kachchh. Routledge. ISBN 978-0-415-54377-4.
- Varadarajan, Siddharth, ed. (2002). Gujarat: The Making of a Tragedy. Penguin (India). ISBN 978-0-14-302901-4.
