= Zakia Jafri =

Indian human rights activist (1938 or 1939 – 2025)

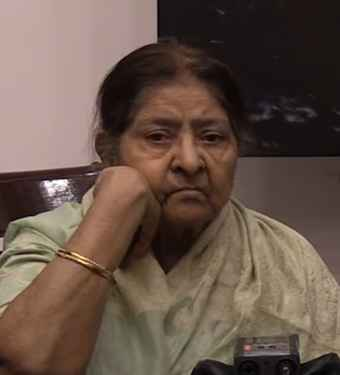
- Jafri during an interview in 2017
- Born: 1938 or 1939; Khandwa, Central Provinces and Berar, British India
- Died: 1 February 2025 (aged 86); Ahmedabad, Gujarat, India
- Occupation: Human rights activist
- Known for: Legal battle for justice in the 2002 Gujarat riots
- Spouse: Ehsan Jafri (died 2002)
- Children: 3

Zakia Naseem Jafri (1938 or 1939 – 1 February 2025) was an Indian human rights activist known for her legal efforts related to the 2002 Gujarat riots. She became widely recognised as the widow of Ehsan Jafri, a Congress Member of Parliament who was killed during the riots.

== Background ==
Zakia Jafri was the widow of Ehsan Jafri, a lawyer from Burhanpur who was elected as a member of parliament in 1977. Born into a wealthy landlord family in Khandwa, Central Provinces and Berar, British India (present day Madhya Pradesh, India), in the late 1930s, she married Jafri when he was serving as an attorney. They had three children: two sons, Tanveer and Zuber, and a daughter, Nishrin.

In 1969, during communal riots in Khandwa, their home was attacked, forcing them to stay in a refugee camp for some time before relocating to Ahmedabad in 1971. Jafri died in Ahmedabad on 1 February 2025, at the age of 86. She was interred in the same cemetery as her husband.

== The 2002 Gujarat riots ==
Widespread riots occurred in Gujarat in 2002. The state government later stated 790 Muslims and 254 Hindus were killed during the riots; independent sources put the death toll at over 2,000, the vast majority of them Muslims. The Gulbarg Society massacre occurred during the riots, on 28 February. A crowd began pelting stones at the Gulbarg Society, a Muslim neighbourhood in the eastern part of Chamanpura in Ahmedabad. Ehsan Jafri was among 35 victims burned alive, while 31 others went missing and were presumed dead. According to Zakia Jafri, she and a few others managed to survive by hiding in an upstairs room.

== Legal proceedings ==
Zakia Jafri filed a petition in the Supreme Court of India in 2006, alleging that law enforcement authorities had failed to take action against key political figures, including then–Chief Minister Narendra Modi. In 2008, the Supreme Court directed a Special Investigation Team (SIT) to examine her claims. The SIT concluded the investigation in 2012, finding that there was not sufficient evidence to prosecute Modi or other officials. Jafri filed a plea challenging the SIT's findings, which was dismissed by the Supreme Court in June 2022, upholding the closure report. As a result of her numerous legal filings, Jafri was seen as the "face of the fight for justice" for the victims of the 2002 riots, according to the Mint.

In a report from The Caravan, Jafri stated that her husband, Ehsan Jafri, made multiple calls to senior Gujarat state officials, including then-Chief Minister Narendra Modi, seeking help as a mob surrounded Gulberg Society during the 2002 Gujarat riots. According to her, Jafri pleaded for intervention but received no assistance. A witness later testified in court that Jafri had also called Modi and was allegedly met with verbal abuse rather than support.
