= M. D. Antani =

Indian Police Service officer

Manoj D. (Mayur) Antani (born June 7, 1954), is a retired Indian Police Service officer for the Indian government. In 2011, he was appointed Home Secretary of Gujarat.

Prior to that he was the Regional Passport Officer since 2004.Times of India (2) Antani, the former SP of Bharuch, was transferred out of Bharuch to Narmada district in March 2002 for taking action against some BJP/VHP supporters creating political turmoil in Bharuch. He was later given the rank of deputy superintendent (DSP). DSP Antani became a public figure in India shortly afterwards, as he was the most senior ranking officer during the Godhra train burning. The train burning led to significant rioting, resulting in the death of over 100 people. Antani played a role in maintaining law and order throughout the riots.

Since his time in Godhra, Mr. Antani has received several awards regarding his performance; however, has also received much controversy for his stance against prominent political figures. His most recent award is the Manager of the Year Award in 2007 presented by Uday Kotak, vice-chairman of Kotak-Mahindra Bank at IIM (Indian Institute of Management).

He is currently working as a Corporate Affairs Advisor with Reliance Industries. He has two children and they reside in Ahmedabad.
