= Kingshuk Nag =

Indian journalist

Kingshuk Nag is an Indian author and editor with The Times of India and a recipient of the Prem Bhatia Award for Outstanding Political Reporting of The Year.

== Life and career ==
Nag studied in Delhi, culminating in MA in economics from the Delhi School of Economics in 1980.

Nag worked as a deputy editor for Business India, as an editor and PR officer for the Associated Chambers of Commerce and Industry of India, as the New Delhi reporter for the Indian Express and as a staff writer and economist for Tata Economic Consultancy Services. Since 1993, he has worked for The Times of India. He was its business news chief, working in Delhi and Bangalore, in which role he brought business news to the front page in the wake of economic liberalisation. Since 2000, he has been the Resident Editor, first in Ahmedabad and then, since 2005, in Hyderabad.

In his Ahmedabad post, Nag was witness to the Bhuj earthquake, the installation of Narendra Modi as the Chief Minister and the 2002 Gujarat riots. He received the Prem Bhatia Award for Outstanding Political Reporting of The Year in 2002 for his "courageous reporting of Gujarat riots" along with reporter Bharat Desai. By his own account, he was threatened by the Vishva Hindu Parishad chief Praveen Togadia that he would be socially boycotted if he did not "mend his ways".

Since 2005, as the Resident Editor in Hyderabad, Nag has covered events such as corporate fraud at Satyam Computers and the agitation for statehood for Telangana.

== Works ==
- The Double Life of Ramalinga Raju : The Story of India's Biggest Corporate Fraud (2012), ASIN B008V8HGXW
- Kingfizzer: The Rise and Fall of Vijay Mallya
- Battlegrond Telangana (2012), ISBN 978-93-5029-074-3
- The NaMo story : a political life. New Delhi: Lotus Collection. 2013. ISBN 978-81-7436-938-3. OCLC 841033696.The NaMo Story is a biography of Narendra Modi, which had been in conception since 2002 according to Nag, but no publishers were available to publish an unbiased biography of Modi until 2012. Excerpts from the book have appeared in Outlook and Firstpost.
- The Saffron Tide (2014), ISBN 8129131277
- Netaji: Living Dangerously (2016) ISBN 8129142171
- Atal Bihari Vajpayee : A Man For All Seasons (2017) ISBN 9788129145246
- Mohan Bhagwat: Influencer-in-Chief (2018)
- A New Silk Road: India, China and the Geopolitics of Asia (2021)
