= Ashok Singhal =

Indian activist (1926–2015)

- Born: 27 September 1926; Agra, United Provinces of Agra and Oudh, British India (present day Uttar Pradesh, India)
- Died: 17 November 2015 (aged 89); Gurgaon, Haryana, India
- Education: (B.Tech.) IIT BHU
- Occupation: Former Leader of Vishva Hindu Parishad
- Awards: Dharmashree Award

Ashok Singhal (27 September 1926 – 17 November 2015) was an Indian activist and the international working president of the Hindu organisation Vishva Hindu Parishad (VHP) for over 20 years and in charge of the Ayodhya Ram Janmabhoomi movement. He was replaced in the Vishva Hindu Parishad in December 2011 following a long bout of diminishing physical health. Succeeded by Praveen Togadia, Singhal suffered ill-health but was working till a month before his death.

== Life ==
Singhal was born in Agra. His father Mr Mahavir Singh Singhal(Vill Bijoli, atrauli, District Aligarh) was an ICS (Indian Civil Service) government official. He had six brothers and a sister. His elder brothers were Vinod P Singhal Retd as Chief Secretary State of Tripura, Pramod P Singhal a businessman based in Udaipur, Anand P Singhal a senior officer in the Defence Ministry and his younger brothers were, BP Singhal, former DGP, UP Police and BJP Rajya Sabha MP, Piyush Singhal a businessman based in Mumbai and Vivek Singhal a businessman based in Delhi. His sister, Usha Rani Singhal was also a sangh pracharak and led the women front. Singhal received a bachelor's degree in Metallurgical Engineering from the Indian Institute of Technology (BHU) Varanasi in 1950.

Singhal was a trained vocalist in Hindustani music. He studied under Pandit Omkarnath Thakur.

He died on 17 November 2015 at Medanta Medicity hospital in Gurgaon, aged 89. On 1 October 2015, the book Hindutva Ke Purodha was released and officially launched by the then Home Minister of India, Rajnath Singh. The book describes all dedications to his political party and India. This was written by Mahesh Bhagchandaka.

== Career ==
=== Rashtriya Swayamsevak Sangh ===
Ashok Singhal joined Rashtriya Swayamsevak Sangh (RSS) in 1942 under tutelage of Balasaheb Deoras. After obtaining a degree in Engineering, he opted to become a full-time pracharak. He worked in various locations around Uttar Pradesh, becoming a prant pracharak for Delhi and Haryana. In 1980, he was deputed to the VHP, becoming its joint general secretary. In 1984, he became its general secretary and, later, the working president, a role in which he continued till 2011.

=== Vishva Hindu Parishad ===
After the Meenakshipuram conversions in 1981, Singhal moved to the VHP as the joint general secretary. After noting the main grievance of the Dalit communities in the area as being access to temples, VHP built 200 temples specifically for Dalits. He says that the conversions stopped afterwards.

Singhal was a key organiser of the first VHP Dharma Sansad in 1984 held at Vigyan Bhavan in New Delhi, attracting hundreds of sadhus and Hindu notables to discuss the issues of rejuvenating Hinduism. The movement for reclaiming the Ram Janmabhoomi temple was born here. Singhal soon became the chief architect of the movement.

=== Fast unto death and Force Feeding ===
During the tenure of Prime Minister Atal Bihari Vajpayee (1998–2004), the pair of Vajpayee and Singhal fell out when he felt that NDA Government of Vajpayee was not taking any further steps in building Ram Mandir.

Ashok Singhal then went on fast unto death on the demand of the construction of Ram Mandir at Ayodhya. He was "Force Fed" on the orders of Atal Bihari Vajpayee. This saddened Ashok Singhal and badly affected once good relations of Singhal and Vajpayee for the rest of his life.

== Philosophy ==
Ashok Singhal openly promoted his Hindu views. In every public meeting after 1989, wherever he gave speech, there was definitely talks of Hindu and of Hindu's interest.

== Bibliography ==
- Jaffrelot, Christophe (1996). The Hindu Nationalist Movement and Indian Politics. C. Hurst & Co. Publishers. ISBN 978-1850653011.
- Katju, Manjari (2013). Vishva Hindu Parishad and Indian Politics. Orient Blackswan. ISBN 978-81-250-2476-7.
