= Gulbarg Society massacre =

Killings during 2002 Gujarat violence

Coordinates: 23°2′52″N 72°36′49″E

- Part of the 2002 Gujarat riots
- Location: Ahmedabad, Gujarat, India
- Date: 28 February 2002
- Target: Muslims
- Attack type: Communal Riot
- Deaths: 69 deaths

The Gulbarg Society massacre took place on 28 February 2002, during the 2002 Gujarat riots, when a crowd started stone pelting the Gulbarg Society, a Muslim neighbourhood in the eastern part of Chamanpura, Ahmedabad in the Indian state of Gujarat. Most of the houses were burnt, and at least 35 victims, including a former Congress Member of Parliament (Lok Sabha), Ehsan Jafri, were burnt alive, while 31 others went missing after the incident, later presumed dead, bringing the total deaths to 69.

The Supreme Court of India had stayed the trial in major Gujarat cases on petitions filed by the National Human Rights Commission (NHRC) and the Citizens for Justice and Peace, who sought a probe by the Central Bureau of Investigation (CBI) and transfer of the cases outside Gujarat. The SC bench on 26 March 2008, directed the Gujarat government to constitute a Special Investigation Team (SIT), headed by R. K. Raghavan, a former head of the CBI in the case. It reopened nine crucial riot cases. Seven years after the incident, in February 2009, Erda, the Deputy Superintendent of Police (DSP) with the Gujarat Police at the time was arrested on charges of dereliction of duty and for tampering with evidence, as some survivors alleged that he allowed the killings to happen and helped rioters to burn the dead bodies. The SIT finally submitted its report on 14 May 2010 to the apex court registry of the Supreme Court, after which the Supreme Court asked the SIT to look into the doubts raised by amicus curiae Raju Ramchandran. SIT submitted its entire report including case papers, witnesses' testimonies and other details on 15 March 2012. On 17 June 2016, eleven people convicted of murder in the Gulbarg Society massacre were sentenced to life in jail by a special SIT court.

The Society, with most of the houses damaged or burnt, were later abandoned. Of the eighteen houses which were burnt, only one has been repaired. Although none of the families returned, some of them congregate each year on the anniversary of the event and offer prayers.

== Massacre ==
At 9 am on 28 February 2002, a day after the 2002 Gujarat riots had begun, a mob shouting slogans gathered outside the Gulbarg Society in the Hindu-dominated Chamanpura area of Ahmedabad. The Society comprised 29 bungalows and 10 apartment buildings, housing mostly Muslim upper-middle-class business families. Many of the residents reacted to the presence of the mob by taking refuge in the home of a former Congress MP, Ehsan Jafri. It was claimed that Jafri unsuccessfully made repeated attempts to contact the police by telephone. He called and spoke to the chief of police and chief minister for help. By noon, the mob had turned violent, breached the boundary wall and started to set fire to houses and attack residents. 69 people died during the following six hours and at least a further 85 were injured. Among the dead was Ehsan Jafri, who was hacked to death and later burnt, while at least another 35 people were either hacked to death or burned alive.

== Aftermath ==
The National Human Rights Commission (NHRC) said in June 2002, that it was "deeply disturbed by recent press reports stating that the chargesheets filed thus far in respect of the Gulbarg Society and Naroda Patiya incidents lack credibility in as much as they are reported to depict the victims (Muslims) of violence as the provocateurs." NHRC had previously recommended that cases like Best Bakery case, Gulbarg Society case, the Naroda Patiya incident and the Sardarpura case in Mehsana district be handed over to CBI.

The Supreme Court, on 26 March 2008, ordered the Narendra Modi government to re-investigate ten cases in the 2002 Gujarat riots, including the Godhra train burning and subsequent Godhra riots, where 81 people were killed, Gulbarg Society where 68 were killed, Naroda Patia where over 100 were killed, Sardarpur where 34 were killed and Best Bakery case where 14 people were burnt alive. Zakiya Jafri, wife of Ehsan Jafri, who was burnt alive on the day, first made the complaint on 8 June 2006 alleging that the police had not registered the FIRs against Gujarat Chief Minister Narendra Modi, and 62 others including several ministers and alleging a conspiracy to allow the massacre of Muslims, which involved instructing policemen and bureaucrats not to respond to pleas for help from Muslims being attacked during the riots. The complaint included Vishva Hindu Parishad leaders Praveen Togadia and Jaideep Patel, Director General of Police (DGP) of the state PC Pande for abetting the riots. She then approached the Gujarat High Court with her complaint, which on 3 November 2007, refused to entertain her plea, and instead asked her to present the case before magistrate's court. Subsequently, she approached the Supreme Court of India, which on 27 April 2009 appointed a five-member SIT headed by R. K. Raghavan, a former head of the CBI, to investigate into these cases, and asked the SIT to look into her complaint of alleged collusion of the state machinery and the rioters over the two days of Gujarat riots.

In March 2009, Indian National Congress leader Meghsingh Chaudhary at the instance of SIT was arrested for active participation in the Gulbarg Society massacre. It alleged that he was a part of the armed mob, egging them on to kill the Muslims, along with others. Then in March 2010, SIT summoned Gujarat Chief Minister Narendra Modi to give an explanation regarding accusations against him in the murder of Ehsan Jaffri, who was burnt alive, along with nearly 70 other people in the Gulbarg Society. He appeared before the SIT on 27 Mar 2010. Earlier, R B Sreekumar, who was Additional Director General of Intelligence at the time, deposed before a commission that ministers and police were "deliberately inactive during the riots" and two eyewitnesses Roopa Modi and Imtiyaz Pathan testified against Modi in the trial court. Imtiaz who lost six members of his family during the massacre, was the one to give the first eyewitness account in the trial which started in September 2009, after being held up for 7 years. He told the court that when a mob started gathering outside Gulbarg Society on 28 February, MP Jafri called Chief Minister Narendra Modi for help, yet the police refused to come for help. He identified 20 of the 100 accused, arrested in the case. In all, the eyewitness who appeared before the SIT in December 2009, namely, Imtiyaz Pathan, Saeedkhan Pathan, Roopa Mody, Saira Sandhi and Rafiq Pathan named joint commissioner of police MK Tandon and Meghaninagar police inspector ND Parmar, Manish Patel alias Splendor, Mahendra Pukhraj, Jagroopsinh Rajput, Inio Harijan, Babu Marwadi and Rajesh Jinger, a constable residing in the same area, as accused.

In March 2010, the Gulbarg Society case trial was stayed by the Supreme Court after the special public prosecutor R K Shah resigned after accusing the trial judge and SIT of being "soft on the accused". He alleged that, "The SIT officers are unsympathetic towards witnesses, they try to browbeat them and don't share evidence with the prosecution as they are supposed to do." Later, activist Teesta Setalvad in an affidavit filed before the Supreme Court on 24 April 2010, showed the phone record analysis which indicated that "Ahmedabad police commissioner P C Pande had spoken to Joint Commissioner of Police M K Tandon six times during the period when the latter was present at Gulbarg Society and the mob was growing restive. Though Tandon was accompanied by "striking force" equipped to disperse a riotous mob, he left Gulbarg Society without taking any corrective action and his departure led to the massacre ...".

On 14 May 2010, the SIT submitted a report under sealed cover. Prior to this, the SIT had requested additional time to report as it wanted to question VHP International president, Praveen Togadia, which it did on 11 May 2010.

On 15 December 2010, Zakia Jafri and other victims filed an application with the Supreme Court, requesting it to direct SIT to submit the report before the Ahmedabad court as ordered by the SC, within 30 days. Thereafter on 8 February 2012, SIT submitted its final report to a Gujarat magistrate's court, which after evaluating it would decide whether further investigation was required or not.

In its closure report filed in the Zakia Jafri case, the SIT submitted that Jafri was killed because he provoked a "violent mob" that had assembled "to take revenge of Godhra incident from the Muslims". It further submitted that Jafri fired at the mob and "the provoked mob stormed the society and set it on fire."

== Sting operation ==
In October 2007, the Aaj Tak News Channel showed footage of a sting operation carried out by Tehelka magazine, wherein 14 VHP or Bajrang Dal activists, including, Madan Chawal, a Gulbarg Society massacre accused, and a Bharatiya Janata Party MLA from Godhra, Haresh Bhatt who was national vice-president of Bajrang Dal during the riots, were shown talking about the execution of the killings . The investigative journalists' reports were finally published in the 3 November 2007 issue of Tehelka as The Truth: Gujarat 2002 – Tehelka report.

On 18 June 2016, Special court junked the evidence provided by investigative journalist with the observation that the entire transcript was not tendered before the probe agency or the court.

== Allegations against Narendra Modi and SIT report ==
In April 2012, a Special Investigation Team absolved the then Gujarat Chief Minister Narendra Modi of any role in the killing of Ehsan Jafri Later a protest petition was filed by his wife Zakia Jafri seeking rejection of the said SIT report and Supreme Court accepted the same and the case is under process of being heard. SIT has strongly opposed this petition and said that "Modi has never said that go and kill people". Later Court through Gujarat High Court stayed the routine transfer of the metropolitan magistrate hearing the petition on the information of the amicus curiae, Harish Salve, that the routine transfer due to the end of his term may delay the case. In 2004, in an interview with Hardnews, Former Chief Justice of India V N Khare alleged that massacre could not have taken place without the complicity of Gujarat Chief Minister Narendra Modi. Khare has said that in his opinion Narendra Modi should be criminally prosecuted for genocide and manslaughter for the Gulbarga Society Massacre. Reacting to this observation, Modi did not make any statement but said that he could not distinguish between khare (just) and khote (unjust). He said that Khare was no longer holding the high office and his statement should be seen in this light. However, in December 2013, Ahmedabad Metropolitan Court rejected the petition filed by Zakia. Zakia filed a Criminal Revision Application against the order in the Gujarat High Court on 15 March 2014. The final hearing on the case started on 4 August 2015 in Gujarat High Court. In April 2014 the Supreme Court praised SIT's probe into the riot cases, and also declined to reconstitute another SIT for probing Gujarat riots.

== Court judgement ==
Gulbarg Society Massacre trial restarted at a special court with Supreme Court monitored Special Investigation Team acting as prosecution. On 18 June 2016, Court convicted 24 persons. 11 convicted for life, 1 convicted for 10 years and the remaining 12 given seven years of rigorous imprisonment. The judgement termed the killings "unfortunate" and the "darkest day in the civil society of Gujarat", but reiterated that "it was the private firing by Ehsan Jafri that acted as a catalyst and which infuriated the mob to such an extent that the mob went out of control…". The survivors of the massacre said that Jafri fired his gun in self defence after the violent mob started attacking the complex.

Dismissing the allegations of a "larger conspiracy" behind the post-Godhra riots, including the Gulbarg Society massacre, involving politicians and government machinery, Special Designated Judge P B Desai said in his judgment that "the controversy, in my opinion, has been laid to rest and is required to be given its due burial". Judgement further stated that "…much attempts have been made to rake up this issue time and again, applications were tendered in the course of the present proceedings and independent proceedings have been initiated to seek reliefs under Section 319 of CrPC to arraign as co-accused senior police officers and other government officials, and such proceedings have been found to be without merit by all courts at all levels, including the Hon'ble Supreme Court of India.......no material has been considered even prima facie worthwhile to arraign such senior police officers and government officials and politicians in power as accused in a number of proceedings, including the present proceedings, and in my opinion, therefore, it would be unsafe and improper to even have a further discussion on this aspect.".

== In popular culture ==
Rahul Dholakia directed, Parzania (2005), starring Naseeruddin Shah and Sarika as the Parsi couple, Rupa and Dara Mody of the Gulbarg Society, whose 10-year-old son Azhar Mody went missing after a mob attack. Subsequently, at the 2006 National Film Awards the film won two awards, the National Film Award for Best Actress for Sarika, as well as award for National Film Award for Best Direction. The film was not released in Gujarat, as the cinema owners refused to screen it fearing backlash.

== See also ==
- List of massacres in India
- Naroda Patiya massacre
- Violence against Muslims in India
