= A New Silk Road =

2021 book by Kingshuk Nag

A New Silk Road: India, China and the Geopolitics of Asia
- Author: Kingshuk Nag
- Language: English
- Subject: Geopolitics
- Genre: Nonfiction
- Published: 10 February 2021
- Publisher: Rupa Publications
- Publication place: India
- Media type: Hardcover
- Pages: 184
- ISBN: 978-93-90547-58-6

A New Silk Road: India, China and the Geopolitics of Asia is a nonfiction book by Kingshuk Nag, an Indian author and editor with The Times of India.

== Overview ==
In the summer of 2020, China engaged in a conflict with India in the border areas of Ladakh. This occurred even though China was facing international condemnation for its response to the COVID-19 epidemic. It was an attempt to divert attention away from the pandemic.

Through this book, the author analyses outmoded notions about China and argues that it is essential to comprehend the country's history and draw lessons from it to evaluate contemporary geopolitical events.

== Reception ==
Writing for The Book Review, Bappaditya Mukherjee calls "[the book] is an excellent primer on the India-China bilateral relationship. Nag takes a very hawkish position throughout this book and perceives China as a pernicious actor that is irreconcilably antagonistic to India’s interests."

In a review for The New Indian Express, Gautam Chintamani writes, "Nag's lucid narrative presents deep insights into the political, economic, social and cultural factors that impact the current India-China relationship. A New Silk Road is a much-needed manual for anyone interested in international affairs."
