= Raju Ramachandran =

Indian lawyer

- Born: 14 May 1954 (age 72); New Delhi
- Occupation: Lawyer

Raju Ramachandran (born 14 May 1954) is a senior advocate at the Supreme Court of India and a former Additional Solicitor General. He served as an amicus curiae (friend of the court) for the Supreme Court of India in the 2002 Gujarat riots case and in the appeal of Ajmal Kasab in the 2008 Mumbai attacks case.

== Early life and education ==
Ramchandran was brought up in Delhi. He studied economics at St. Stephen's College, Delhi. Initially he wanted to be a journalist but he was so affected by the Kesavananda Bharati judgment that he decided to study law. He studied law at the Faculty of Law of Delhi University.

== As a lawyer ==
Ramchandran joined the bar in July 1976 at the chambers of MK Ramamurthi and three and half years later started an independent practice. He qualified as an Advocate-on-Record in the Supreme Court of India and was designated as a Senior Advocate by the Supreme Court in September, 1996 at the age of 42. He was elected as vice-president of the Supreme Court Bar Association for 2001 – 2002. In 2002 the NDA Government appointed him as an Additional Solicitor General of India and he remained so till the change of government in 2004. He has argued several important cases in the Supreme Court and various High Courts in various branches of law including Constitutional Law, Administrative Law, Service Law, Admiralty Law, Civil Law and Copyright Law.

He was an amicus curae in deciding the appeal of the Ajmal Kasab in relation to his conviction in the 2008 Mumbai attacks case. He also acted as an amicus curae in the Gulbarg Society case related to the 2002 Gujarat riots. He had donated his fees in the Mumbai attack case to the legal service authority which was directed to be distributed among family members of the eighteen state policemen and other security personnel who sacrificed their lives in the 26/11 anti-terror operations. This was described as an act of "high professional ethics" and was appreciated by the Supreme Court of India.

Ramachandran was the counsel for the Justice Sawant Committee under the Judges Inquiry Act-1968, which probed the charges against Justice V Ramaswami. He also represented the state of Kerala before the Cauvery Water Disputes Tribunal, besides the Justice RS Pathak Inquiry Committee, which inquired into issues arising from the Volcker Report.
