= Gujarat Today =

Indian newspaper

- Type: Daily newspaper
- Format: Broadsheet
- Publisher: Lokhit Prakashan Sarvajanik Trust
- Editor: Mustufakhan
- Founded: 1991
- Language: Gujarati
- Headquarters: Ahmedabad at Shah-e-Alam
- Country: India
- Website: www.gujarattoday.in

Gujarat Today Daily (Gujarati: ગુજરાત ટુડે) is a large-circulation Gujarati language daily newspaper in Gujarat, India. It is published in Gujarati by the Lokhit Prakashan Sarvajanik Trust and edited by Aziz Tankarvi. Its main office is in Ahmedabad at Shah-e-Alam. Gujarat Today represents the Muslims of Gujarat, and is considered to have an orthodox outlook. Sharif Sheikh has been serving as Bureau Chief of Vadodara in Gujarat Today for more than 20 years, Idrish Kauji-Wahid Mashadi in Bharuch and Munir Sheikh in Ankleshwar. While Musaddique Kanungo has been working as the Bureau Chief of South Gujarat since the year 2019.Burhan Pathan has been serving as Bureau Chief of Anand District in Gujarat Today for more than 30 years.
