= Scarred: Experiments with Violence in Gujarat =

Non-fiction book

- Author: Dionne Bunsha
- Genre: Non-fiction
- Publisher: Penguin
- Publication date: 2006

Scarred: Experiments with Violence in Gujarat is an Indian, non-fiction book that covers the violence in the Indian province of Gujarat, that was targeted largely at the region's Muslim community. It is authored by award-winning Mumbai-based journalist Dionne Bunsha, and published by Penguin in 2006.

== Gujarat's experiment ==
This book argues that there was a "much larger politics of violence" behind the riots in Gujarat, also known as the 2002 Gujarat violence, and is based on the first-hand experiences and interviews of a journalist who covered this region of India during the period. Gujarat has been called "Hindutva’s laboratory", because of what some see as an attempt to use the region to engineer politics based on intense-religious strife within India and its long-term impacts on the social landscape.

Scarred also captures the trauma of the Sabarmati Express survivors, those hit by a mystery fire on a train that killed nearly 58 Hindu pilgrims, and was blamed by some as triggering off the anti-Muslim violence. This has also been called the Godhra Train Burning. But this book is also an intense portrait of refugees scarred by the prolonged anti-Muslim violence, people fighting for justice amidst fear and turmoil, unable to return home.

This book looks at "the minds of the perpetrators" and "the world they seek to construct", the "ghettoisation" and the boycott of Muslims, which have become the norm.

It raises questions such as: Was it just a burning train that sparked the communal carnage in March 2002? Why did India's political leaders fiddle while Gandhi’s Gujarat burned?

== Reviews ==
India Today's Book Club termed this the "pick of the season". In The Hindu, C T Kurien has termed the book "meticulous, moving, sensitive, thought-provoking." Amit Sengupta, writing in Tehelka said: "Beautiful...Scarred is not dark, it is one assured step forward inside the darkness, to explore light... It’s straight-forward, honest to the core, a reporter’s authentic notebook on the wounds that have refused to heal." Sunil Sethi in Indian national TV network NDTV's Just Books called it "much more than just a story but an extraordinary document."

== Human rights, social justice themes ==
Some of her other coverage focuses on themes such as abuses in juvenile homes, the agriculture crisis and consequent farmer suicides in Vidarbha, environmental issues like industrial pollution, wildlife conservation in the Gir forest, displacement due to SEZs (special economic zones) and other projects, housing and employment problems in Mumbai, public health, education and politics.
