= Chamanpura =

Village in Jhajjar district, Haryana, India

Chamanpura is a village in Beri in Jhajjar district of Haryana State, India, on Rohtak-Jhajjar road near Dujana village. The village is administrated by Sarpanch an elected representative of the village. It is majority Hindu, but the eastern neighbourhood of Gulbarg Society was majority Muslim. On 28 February 2002, it was the site of the Gulbarg Society massacre, in which 69 people were killed, including former Congress Member of Parliament, Ehsan Jafri.
