= Kinshuk (professor) =

Professor of information science

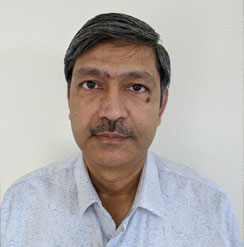
- Kinshuk in 2020
- Born: Rajasthan, India
- Education: Rajasthan University (BS); Strathclyde University (MS); De Montfort University (PhD)
- Scientific career
- Fields: Learning Technologies
- Workplaces: University of North Texas Athabasca University

Dr. Kinshuk, who goes by a single name , is a dean at the College of Information and professor in the department of learning technologies at the University of North Texas. His research and activities of interest include learning analytics, learning technologies, mobile, ubiquitous, and location aware learning systems, cognitive profiling, and interactive technologies.

Kinshuk has served as industrial research chair of the Natural Sciences and Engineering Research Council of Canada in 2010, a professor in the School of Computing and Information Systems at Athabasca University, and associate dean in the Faculty of Science and Technology at Athabasca University. Kinshuk served on the board of directors for the US India Chamber of Commerce from January 2022 to June 2023. Kinshuk currently serves on board of directors of iSchools since January 2024 and advisory board for Dallas A.I. since March 2024.

Kinshuk was born in Rajasthan, India, and earned a Bachelor of Mechanical Engineering from Rajasthan University in 1992, a Master of Science in mechanical computer aided engineering from Strathclyde University in Scotland, and a Ph.D. from De Montfort University in Leicester, United Kingdom in 1996.

== Books ==
- Kinshuk (2016). Designing Adaptive and Personalized Learning Environments, New York: Routledge. ISBN 978-1-138-01306-3
