= 1981 Meenakshipuram conversion =

Mass conversion of Hindus to Islam in India

The 1981 Meenakshipuram Conversion was a mass religious conversion that took place in the Indian village of Meenakshipuram, Tamil Nadu, in which hundreds of oppressed caste Hindus converted to Islam. This incident sparked debate over freedom of religion in India and the government decided to introduce anti-conversion legislation. Later, many converts converted back to Hinduism, citing the lack of fulfillment of promises made during the conversions.

== Conversion ==
Meenakshipuram is a village in the Tirunelveli district of Tamil Nadu, India. The scheduled caste members in the village were segregated by the other castes, who referred to them as untouchables on the basis of the Indian caste system. The district had a long history of caste-related violence. They embraced Islam, tired of upper caste atrocities, mostly by the landed OBC Thevar community in the village. The scheduled caste members, who belonging to the Pallar community, had historically tussled with the majority Maravar community. The Pallars were considered untouchable by the majority community. They were predominantly employed as farm labour and their income and education was lower. During the time of conversion, there was reportedly 40 per cent of Pallar youths were educated who induced the conversion. Though originally 220 families were registered for conversions, about 40 of them changed their mind and 180 families attended the ceremony held on 19 February 1981.

== Aftermath ==
After the incident, the Tamil Nadu government set up an inquiry commission to investigate the conversion. The commission in its report suggested an anti-conversion bill to be passed by the state government, but the government put it on hold.

The media reported that the conversion took place by force, using foreign funding. While some converts denied the allegations, others said that they had been bribed. Ayyappan, a resident of Meenakshipuram, said that he had declined an offer of Rs. 500 in cash to convince him to renounce his faith. One news paper had also printed a photo of a currency note from a Gulf country.

The official report of SC / ST, the Government of India on the conversions said: "Dalits were those who contacted Muslims for the first time ... they went to Tirunelveli to ask Muslim leaders to join Islam; Their elders have considered converting to Islam for 20 years. Converts contributed Rs 41,000 for their conversion ceremony. An estimated of 1,100 scheduled caste members from the village had converted to Islam.

Prime Minister Indira Gandhi was reportedly unhappy, and Home Minister Zail Singh questioned if "a conspiracy or political motivation" was involved in these conversions. A number of press reporters and politicians such as Atal Bihari Vajpayee and Yogendra Makwana visited the village.

Most of the converted Dalits became supporters of the All India Anna Dravida Munnetra Kazhagam (AIADMK), while the upper caste Thevars have aligned with the Bharatiya Janata Party (BJP).

The BJP later took the issue of Meenakshipuram conversion to the Parliament when it reached the Lok Sabha in 1984 with two seats. Its cause gathered momentum over the years and culminated with the Babri Masjid demolition in 1992.

Many of the converts left Islam later on. By July 1981, some of the converts returned to Hinduism. In 1991, a decade later, 900 out of 1,100 converts returned to Hinduism, citing the lack of fulfillment of promises made during the conversions. In 2015, 33 years after the incident, Rediff.com conducted a survey in the village and reported that those who converted to Islam said they were happy. In 2019, The Muslims insist that they are now being accorded dignity and respect. Of the many who continue to remain Muslims, almost all have reconverted to Hinduism after conversion.
