= Freedom Firm =

Non-profit human rights organization

- Established: 2006
- Location: India
- Website: www.freedom.firm.in

Freedom Firm is a non-profit human rights organization based in India. It was founded in 2006, by Greg Malstead, who was an attorney and served as the International Justice Mission Director in Mumbai for five years, and his wife Mala. Their mission is to rescue victims of sex trafficking and restore their identity, while also serving to seek justice against the perpetrators.

== Human trafficking in Southeast Asia ==
According to the Trafficking in Persons Report, India consistently places on the Tier 2 Watch List. This is defined by the following characteristics:

- The number of victims is significantly increasing.
- There is a failure to provide evidence of increasing efforts to combat severe forms of trafficking in people in the previous year.

Tier-2 countries are those whose governments do not fully meet the minimum standards set by the Victims of Trafficking and Violence Protection Act of 2000 (TVPA) but are making significant efforts to bring themselves into compliance with those standards.

Despite straightforward penalties for trafficking proscribed by the Indian Penal Code, as well as the Immoral Trafficking Prevention Act of 1956 and the passage of the Child Labor Act of 1986, corruption in India has perpetuated the issue, as well as insufficient or inadequate laws, poor enforcement, ineffective penalties, minimal chance of prosecution, invisibility of the issue, and the failure of governments to implement policies and provide adequate services for victims. This is further complicated by the economic niche filled by sex traffickers, which amounts to US$32 billion worldwide.

As such, the issue is pervasive and ingrained in many Indian socio-economic infrastructures. The scenario worsens when taking into account the country's high rate of HIV/AIDS, which is the third highest in the world. In a recent study of Nepalese girls trafficked into India and later rescued, 38 percent tested positive for HIV, with girls trafficked prior to age 15 years at an increased risk for HIV, with 60.6 percent infected.

== Rescue, restoration and justice ==
=== Rescue ===
Freedom Firm mitigates the trafficking of individuals from major human trafficking hubs in towns and cities where little effort has been made towards combating the issue. Pune, for example, is the eighth largest city in India, with the third largest red-light district, yet did not attain its first sex trafficking conviction until 2008.

The organization sends undercover investigators to monitor red-light areas in Maharashtra and Karnataka to identify minor-aged girls and their traffickers and brothel keepers, document the crime and submit the information to local authorities. The latter then make the corresponding arrests and transfer the underage girls, and any adult women who want to leave, to a government facility.

Freedom Firm workers provide counseling, medical care and education to those staying in the government facility, which could be between six months and three years, leading to rehabilitation and reintegration.
