= Dipankar Gupta =

Indian sociologist (born 11 October 1949)

Dipankar Gupta (born 11 October 1949) is an Indian sociologist and public intellectual. He was formerly Professor in the Centre for the Study of Social Systems, Jawaharlal Nehru University, New Delhi. For a brief period from 1993 to 1994, he was also associated with the Delhi School of Economics as Professor in the Department of Sociology. His current research interests include rural-urban transformation, labour laws in the informal sector, modernity, ethnicity, caste and stratification. He is a regular columnist with The Times of India, The Hindu and occasionally in The Indian Express and Anandbazar Patrika in Bengali. He serves on the board of institutions like the Reserve Bank of India, the National Bank for Agricultural and Rural Development (NABARD) and Max India. He has a son and lives with his wife in New Delhi.

== Early life and education ==
Gupta was born in October 1949 in Patna, Bihar, into a Bengali family. He was raised in Delhi, Mumbai and Kanpur. He completed his MA in Sociology from the University of Delhi in 1971, before doing his PhD from Jawaharlal Nehru University in 1977.

== Career ==
Gupta has had a diverse career in academics, the corporate world and in government agencies. Between 1980 and 2009 Gupta was a professor at the Jawaharlal Nehru University's Centre for the Study of Social Systems. Between 1990 and 2007 he was co-editor of Contributions to Indian Sociology

He started and led KPMG's Business Ethics and Integrity Division, New Delhi; was a member of the National Security Advisory Board and the News Broadcasting Standards Authority. In 2010, he served on the Social Sciences jury for the Infosys Prize. He has also been on the Board of Governors of the Doon School.

== Awards ==
- 2013 D.Litt. Honoris Causa, University of Burdwan, West Bengal
- 2010 Chevalier D'Ordre Des Arts et Des Lettres, (Knight of the Order of Arts and Letters) French Government Award
- 2004 Malcolm Adeseshiah Award

== Bibliography ==
- Gupta, Dipankar (2022) Checkpoint Sociology: A Cultural Reading of Policies and Politics, Delhi: Aakar Books
- Gupta, Dipankar (2018) Talking Sociology (Conversations with Ramin Jahanbegloo), New Delhi: Oxford University Press
- Gupta, Dipankar (2017) From 'People' to 'Citizens': Democracy's Must take Road, Social Science Press. ISBN 978-93-83166-23-7.
- Gupta, Dipankar (2017) QED: India Tests Social Theory, 2017, Oxford University Press. ISBN 978-0-19947651-0
- Gupta, Dipankar (2013). Revolution from Above: India's Future and the Citizen Elite. Rainlight. ISBN 978-8129124609.
- Gupta, Dipankar (2011). Justice before Reconciliation: Negotiating a 'New Normal' in Post-riot Mumbai and Ahmedabad. Routledge. ISBN 978-1136196867.
- Gupta, Dipankar (2011). The caged phoenix: can India fly?. Stanford University Press. ISBN 978-0804771894.
- Gupta, Dipankar (2005). Learning to Forget: The Anti-Memoirs of Modernity. Oxford University Press India. ISBN 0195674332.
- Béteille, André (2005). Gupta, Dipankar (ed.). Anti-utopia: Essential Writings of André Béteille. Oxford University Press India. ISBN 0198075979.
- Gupta, Dipankar (2004). Ethics Incorporated: Top Priority and Bottom Line. Sage. ISBN 0761934715.
- Gupta, Dipankar (2004). Gupta, Dipankar (ed.). Caste in question: identity or hierarchy?. Sage. ISBN 0761933247.
- Gupta, Dipankar (2000). Interrogating Caste: Understanding Hierarchy and Difference in Indian Society. Penguin Books India. ISBN 0140297065.
- Gupta, Dipankar (2000). Mistaken Modernity: India Between Worlds. HarperCollins Publishers. ISBN 8172234155.
- Gupta, Dipankar (2000). Culture, Space and the Nation-State: From Sentiment to Structure. Sage. ISBN 0761994998.
- Das, Veena; Gupta, Dipankar; Uberoi, Patricia, eds. (1999). Tradition, pluralism and identity: in honour of T.N. Madan. Contributions to Indian Sociology: Occasional studies. Vol. 8. Sage. ISBN 0761993819.
- Gupta, Dipankar (1997). Rivalry and brotherhood: politics in the life of farmers in northern India. Oxford University Press. ISBN 0195641019.
- Gupta, Dipankar (1996). The Context of Ethnicity: Sikh Identity in a Comparative Perspective. Oxford University Press. ISBN 0195636945.
- Gupta, Dipankar (1996). Political Sociology in India: Contemporary Trends. Orient Blackswan. ISBN 8125006656.
- Gupta, Dipankar, ed. (1992). Social stratification. Oxford University Press. ISBN 978-0-19-563088-6.
- Sharma, Kanhaiya Lal; Gupta, Dipankar, eds. (1991). Country-town nexus: studies in social transformation in contemporary India. Rawat Publications. ISBN 8170330998.
- Gupta, Dipankar (1982). Nativism in a Metropolis: The Shiv Sena in Bombay. Manohar.
