= Ehsan Jafri =

Indian politician

- Ehsan Jafri

Member of Parliament, Lok Sabha
- In office 1977–1980
- Preceded by: Indulal Kanaiyalal Yagnik
- Succeeded by: Maganbhai Barot
- Constituency: Ahmedabad

Personal details
- Born: 1929 Burhanpur, Central Provinces and Berar, British India
- Died: 28 February 2002 (aged 72–73) Ahmedabad, Gujarat, India
- Spouse: Zakia Jafri
- Children: Tanveer Jafri (son); Nishrin Jafri Hussain (daughter); Zuber Jafri (younger son)

Ehsan Jafri (1929 – 28 February 2002) was an Indian politician and former member of the 6th Lok Sabha for the Congress Party, who was killed in the Gulbarg Society massacre during the 2002 Gujarat sectarian violence.

A Special Investigating Team appointed by the Supreme Court of India concluded that he was killed after he fired at an agitated Hindu mob outside his house. His widow, Zakia Jafri has subsequently alleged that the state of Gujarat and its then-chief minister, now the current prime minister of India, Narendra Modi, was partly responsible for the violence and lack of police intervention in favor of the victims at Gulbarg Society. The argument was rejected by a Special Investigation Committee appointed by the Supreme Court in 2008. A review petition was filed by her which gave Prime Minister Narendra Modi a clean chit. A three judge bench of The Supreme Court rejected her review petition, giving the reason that "the petition is devoid of any merit".

== Life ==
Ehsan Jafri was born in a Dawoodi Bohra Family and belonged to the Shia Muslim community. He was born in Burhanpur, present day Madhya Pradesh in 1929, and his father was Dr. Allahbaksh Jafri. In 1935, Ehsan moved to Ahmedabad, studying at the R.C. High School.

Subsequently, he was elected General Secretary of the Progressive Editor's Union. Around this time, he also completed his law degree and started practising as an attorney in Ahmedabad. His family had to suffer during 1969 Gujarat riots too.

In the 1960s, he had joined the Congress Party of Indira Gandhi, and was heading the city unit by 1972. In 1977, after the emergency when the party was routed in most Indian states, Ehsan managed to win the Ahmedabad seat and became a parliamentarian in the 6th Lok Sabha. Thereafter, he remained active in the party and held several key organizational posts in the Congress Party Administration in Gujarat.

General Election, 1977: Ahmedabad
Party	Candidate	Votes	%	±%
INC	Ehsan Jafri	187,715	50.59	
BLD	Brahmkumar Bhatt	177,702	47.90	
IND.	Mahendrakumar Maganlal Dave	1,971	0.53	
IND.	Chandulal Keshavlal Khamar	1,752	0.47	
IND.	Jagatsinh Chandansinh	1,208	0.33	
Majority		10,013	2.69	
Turnout		3,71,018	64.72	

== Death ==
On 28 February 2002, when riots broke out in Gujarat, he was killed by a rampaging mob. By early morning, a large mob gathered at the Gulberg Society in the Chamanpura suburb of Ahmedabad. This was an almost entirely Muslim housing society where the septuagenarian Ehsan Jafri lived. According to First Information Report of the incident filed by police inspector K.G. Erda, the violent mob started attacking Muslim owned establishments in the morning and were dispersed by the police. However, they reassembled around 1 PM armed with swords, sticks, pipe and kerosene. The mob had blown up gas cylinders to blast through walls in the Gulbarg Society. The report also mentions that the rioters were guided by voter lists and computer printouts with the addresses of Muslim-owned properties, information obtained from the local municipal administration. This claim was repeated by at least five Muslim witnesses presented before the Nanavati-Mehta Commission.

Gory details of how former Congress MP Ehsan Jafri was hacked limb by limb at Gulbarg Society, then burnt, have been reported in Indian media exposés, in the words of those who did it but not by survivors and victims. These details were part of undercover video reporting by Tehelka news channel.

Chamanpura is in central Ahmedabad and barely a kilometre from the police station, and less than 2 km from the Police Commissioner's office. Believing the area to be safe given Jafri's presence, many Muslims in the area had gathered in his compound. Around 10:30 in the morning, the Ahmedabad Commissioner of Police, P.C. Pandey, personally visited Jafri and apparently assured him that police reinforcement would be coming. In the next five hours, Jafri and top Congress officials of the state repeatedly kept calling the police and other government officials requesting safe transport for the residents, but no help arrived. The FIR by Erda further stated that the police station had 130 policemen on duty that day, and were well armed with teargas shells. However, no one was deployed to disperse the crowd, despite Ehsan Jafri and top Congress politicians repeatedly contacting the Director General of Police, Police Commissioner, the Mayor, Leader of Opposition in the State and the Parliament, and other top government officials.

== Investigation of death ==
The Tehelka report elicited no response from the Gujarat police, and four months later, the Supreme Court appointed a high level investigative team, including the ex-chief of the Central Bureau of Investigation to investigate eleven major unresolved cases arising from the riots, including this murder. Gulbarg Society massacre trial restarted at a special court with Supreme Court monitored Special Investigation Team acting as prosecution. On 18 June 2016, Court convicted 24 persons: 11 for life, one for 10 years and the remaining 12 given seven years of rigorous imprisonment. The judgment termed the killings "unfortunate" and the "darkest day in the civil society of Gujarat", but reiterated that "it was the private firing by Ehsan Jafri that acted as a catalyst and which infuriated the mob to such an extent that the mob went out of control…". Though the survivors of the Gulbarg massacre say that Jafri fired his gun only in self-defense after the violent mob started attacking the complex. In April 2012, a Special Investigation Team absolved the then Gujarat Chief Minister Narendra Modi from killing of Ehsan Jafri. Later a protest petition was filed by his wife Zakia Jafri seeking rejection of the said SIT report to local Metropolitan Magistrate B J Ganatra. SIT has strongly opposed this petition and said that "Modi has never said that go and kill people". Later the Supreme Court, through the Gujarat High Court, stayed the routine transfer of the metropolitan magistrate who was hearing the petition on the information of the amicus curiae Harish Salve that the routine transfer due to the end of his term may delay the case. However, in December 2013, metropolitan court rejected the petition. Zakia subsequently filed an appeal against it in the higher court. A three judge bench of The Supreme Court rejected her review petition, on 24 June 2022, giving the reason that "the petition is devoid of any merit".

== Personal life ==
Jafri's wife, Zakia Jafri, survived the carnage. His daughter, Nishrin Hussain, lives in Delaware.

Ehsan Jafri had a lifelong interest in literature. While at school, he had brought out an Urdu magazine. He kept writing even during his years of Labour union struggle. In 1996, he published his volume of poetry titled Qandeel ("Lantern") in Urdu.
