= Dionne Bunsha =

Indian journalist

Dionne Bunsha is Climate and Conservation Engagement Coordinator at the University of British Columbia Botanical Gardens in Canada. She was a journalist in India.

== Background ==
Bunsha was born and raised in Mumbai, India. She completed a bachelor's degree in economics and commerce at the University of Mumbai, and a diploma in social communications media at the Sophia Polytechnic, Mumbai, in 1995. She has a master's degree in development studies from the London School of Economics (2000), and in 2008 Bunsha was awarded a prestigious John S. Knight Fellowship for journalism at Stanford University, USA. In mid-2009 she enrolled as a PhD student in environmental studies at Simon Fraser University in Canada, but graduated with a master's in resource and environment management in 2012. By 2010 she had moved into research on indigenous community conservation and cultural heritage, and lectured at Kwantlen Polytechnic University. From 2015 to 2021 she led the Lower Fraser Aboriginal Knowledge project, responding to oil spills and climate change, before joining the University of British Columbia.

== Journalism ==
Bunsha was a journalist in India, mostly in the 1990s and 2000s, exposing suicide deaths among Indian farmers, religious strife in India, human rights, threats to the Indian environment and a range of other crucial issues. She worked for The Times of India from 1995 to 1999, and then Frontline magazine from 2001 to 2008. Her published articles are on human rights, politics, wildlife conservation and climate change. She authored the book, Scarred: Experiments with Violence in Gujarat (2006).

== Awards ==
She was awarded two of the Ramnath Goenka Excellence in Journalism Awards in 2006-2007 for 'Environmental Reporting' and 'Books (Non-Fiction)', presented by the President of India A. P. J. Kalam; the International Federation of Journalists (IFJ) Journalism for Tolerance Prize for South Asia in 2005; the Sanskriti Award for Journalism in 2003; and the People's Union for Civil Liberties Human Rights Award in 2003.
