= Rahul Sharma (Gujarat police) =

Indian Police Service officer and lawyer

- Education: Electrical Engineer
- Alma mater: Indian Institute of Technology Kanpur
- Occupations: Lawyer, ex-Indian Police Service Officer
- Known for: policing during 2002 Gujarat riots
- Spouse: Sumita
- Awards: Satyendra K. Dubey Memorial Award

Rahul Sharma is an ex Indian Police Service (IPS) officer of the Gujarat cadre turned practicing lawyer with Gujarat High Court. He was inducted into the service in 1992. He played a crucial role in policing operations during the 2002 Gujarat riots. He was seconded to the Central Bureau of Investigation (CBI) in 2004, and served there for the next three years. Later, he served as the DIG (armed unit) at Rajkot, Gujarat until seeking voluntary retirement from active service in 2015.

== Personal life ==
Rahul Sharma is a 1992 Gujarat cadre ex-IPS officer. He received a Bachelor of Technology degree in electrical engineering from Indian Institute of Technology Kanpur (IIT-K) in 1987. He also has a degree in law. Followed by the untimely death of his wife in 2013, he took retirement from the police service and started serving as a lawyer at Gujarat High Court.

== 2002 Gujarat riots ==
=== Bhavnagar ===
When the 2002 Gujarat riots broke out on 28 February 2002, Sharma was the Superintendent of Police (SP) in Bhavnagar district, heading a 180-strong police force. He became widely known as one of the few district police chiefs to have "responded vigorously" to control the violence.

On the third day of the violence (2 March), a mob of about 10,000 people tried to set fire to a madrasa on the outskirts of Bhavnagar, a residential Muslim school sheltering 400 students. Sharma issued orders to open fire on the mob, causing injuries and some fatalities, thereby dispersing the mob and averting a disaster. Subsequently, he transferred the children to a safer location inside the city. His timely action was praised by L. K. Advani, the then Union Home Minister, in India's Parliament as well as in his autobiography. On the other hand, Narendra Modi, the then Chief Minister of Gujarat, was angry, according to Kingshuk Nag, complaining that he was "trying to seek cheap publicity and act like a hero."

Sharma's actions also angered the state home minister Gordhan Zadafia, who is reported to have said that "the ratio of deaths" due to police firing was "not proper," meaning that more Hindus than Muslims died due to police firing in Bhavnagar. Sharma also refused to release 21 miscreants arrested for attack on a mosque, as requested by BJP politicians. Local Gujarati newspapers complained that Hindus were not able to avenge the Godhra train burning. Sharma was transferred out of field operations on 24 March and posted as the deputy commissioner of police (DCP) in Ahmedabad's control room.

=== Crime Branch and Call Data Records ===
In his new role as the deputy commissioner in Ahmedabad, Sharma was asked to assist the Crime Branch of Ahmedabad in investigating the Gulberg Society and Naroda Patiya cases. Noting the allegations of complicity by police officers and political leaders in the riots, he suggested that their mobile phone records be examined to ascertain their movements. Accordingly, mobile phone 'call data records' (CDR) were requested from the local phone companies Idea Cellular and Vodafone India. The Crime Branch chief, P. P. Pandey, asked Sharma to process the data himself since it was his idea, which required him to copy the data onto his home computer. Before he could complete the processing, Sharma was transferred out of his post again, in early July. He said that he handed over the CD's containing the data to Pandey through a messenger, but they became untraceable afterwards. Several years after the event, the Gujarat government claimed that Sharma did not submit the CDs and charged him with misconduct.

Since Sharma had a copy of the data on his home computer, he was able to copy it to CD's and submit it to the Nanavati-Shah commission and the Banerjee Committee in 2004, and the Supreme Court-appointed Special Investigation Team later in 2008. The advocate Mukul Sinha representing Jan Sangharsh Manch asked for a copy of the CD from the Banerjee Committee and received it. This enabled lawyers, activists and victims to cite the data, implicating a number of political leaders and police officers, including Maya Kodnani, Jaideep Patel, Babu Bajrangi, police inspector K. K. Mysorewala and senior police officers M. K. Tandon and P. B. Gondia. Calls were also found to have been exchanged with the Home Minister Gordhan Zadafia and the Chief Minister's office in the midst of riots. But the Special Investigation Team did not take action against the senior police officers and politicians.

=== Nanavati Commission Report ===
The Nanavati-Shah commission report on the riots has raised suspicion over the role of Rahul Sharma (among others) in the riots.

== Activism ==
Sharma along with Jan Sangharsh Manch organized a rally for civil rights for Dalits in general and to protest the flogging of Dalit youths at Una, Gujarat in particular in August 2016.

== Recognition ==
In 2012, Sharma was awarded the Satyendra K. Dubey Memorial Award by the IIT-K alumni for having distinguished himself with highest professional integrity.

== Politics ==
In June 2017, he declared to float a political party i.e. Smart Party along with some of his friends to contest upcoming assembly elections.

== See also ==
- Kuldeep Sharma (Cop)
- R. B. Sreekumar
- Sanjiv Bhatt
- Haren Pandya

== Sources ==
- Mitta, Manoj (2014). The Fiction of Fact-Finding: Modi & Godhra. HarperCollins Publishers India. ISBN 978-93-5029-187-0.
- Nag, Kingshuk (2013). The NaMo Story - A Political Life. Roli Books. ISBN 978-8174369383.
