= Scroll.in =

Indian English-language news website

- Website type: News; analysis
- Available in: English
- Area served: India
- Owner: SCSN Pvt Ltd.
- Founders: Samir Patil; Naresh Fernandes; Jennifer O'Brien
- Editors: Naresh Fernandes (Scroll.in, English); Sanjay Dubey (Satyagrah, Hindi)
- Website: scroll.in
- Commercial: Yes
- Launched: 26 January 2014; 12 years ago
- Written in: English

Scroll.in, simply referred to as Scroll, is an Indian digital news and entertainment website. Founded in 2014, it is owned by SCSN Pvt Ltd.

== History ==
=== Background ===
Samir Patil, a Massachusetts Institute of Technology alumnus and McKinsey & Company associate was the founder of ACK Media which published Amar Chitra Katha and Tinkle in India. In 2011, he sold the venture to the Future Group and founded the Scroll Media Inc in the following year. The company was incorporated in Delaware, United States.

=== Launch ===
Scroll.in was launched in January 2014 as an Indian news website through the holding company of Scroll Media Incorporation. It was founded by Samir Patil and senior journalist Naresh Fernandes, along with Jennifer O'Brien, the former head of business development at the travel startup Trabblr. Naresh Fernandes who was previously the editor-in-chief of Time Out India and a journalist associated with The Times of India and The Wall Street Journal, became the editor-in-chief of Scroll.in. The publication had received early stage investments from the IPS Media Foundation, the Media Development Investment Fund and the investment firm of Omidyar Network, following an endorsement from the law firm Khaitan & Co.

=== Partnerships ===
In June 2014, Atlantic Media partnered with the Scroll Media Inc to launch the Indian edition of the business news brand Quartz. In the following year, the Hindi media publishing company Satyagrah was merged with Scroll Media and became the Hindi edition of Scroll.in which continues to operate under the name of Satyagrah. Sanjay Dubey who was the founder and editor of Satyagrah and previously the editor of Tehelka's Hindi edition, remained as the editor of Satyagrah. In March 2018, the publication partially shifted towards a subscription business model providing ad free delivery of news service and access to archives for subscribers. Naresh Fernandes, the editor-in-chief however stated that the publication will not implement any paywalls.

In December 2018, Deutsche Welle partnered with Scroll.in to launch its Indian weekly programme, Eco India as part of DW's venture into the South Asian media industry. Between May–June 2019, Scroll.in laid off a number of editorial staff citing a restructure of their business model.

== Organisation ==
Scroll's staff are segregated into two divisions; the editorial team and the distribution team. In an article of the Columbia Journalism Review, the segregation was explained as the result of caution associated with the "credibility of digital media" prevalent among the former print medium journalists who constituted the editorial team of the new publication. The editorial team in addition consists of an appointed ombudsman for additional editorial oversight. Naresh Fernandes is the current editor-in-chief of the website. The Hindi edition of the publication, Satyagrah, has a separate editorial team with Sanjay Dubey as the editor-in-chief.

The distribution team of the publication is staffed with analysts of social media and search result algorithm who manage the distribution assets of the publication.

== Content ==
According to a report from the Reuters Institute for the Study of Journalism, the content delivery of the Scroll.in resembles "almost the pace of a newswire with the depth and sophistication of a quality news magazine," while the presentation of the site was described to be targeted toward an "up-market" audience and compared favorably with Quartz. The publication's business strategy aims to generate income through premium native advertising and sponsored content, resembling that of traditional magazine advertising rather than obtrusive ads that distract or annoy the reader. The report also described the publication to have developed a simple and responsive design for its website for the purpose of easy accessibility.

In addition to the primary website, the distribution of Scroll's content is provided through an Android app, two email newsletters and an array of social media channels across Facebook, Twitter, Instagram, and YouTube. Scroll also operates an online shop for books and literary accessories based on recommendations from the editorial team.

== Awards ==
- Scroll.in's journalist Supriya Sharma won the Ramnath Goenka Excellence in Journalism Awards for 2015. She was noted to be the first journalist from a digital news organisation to receive the award.
- Scroll.in's journalist Priyanka Vora was one of the winners of the 2016 Early Childhood Development Reporting Contest conducted by the International Center for Journalists.
- Scroll.in Hindi website Satyagrah journalist Rahul Kotiyal won the Ramnath Goenka Excellence in Journalism Awards for 2016, for reporting on a campaign by RSS and Bajrang Dal named "Beti Bachao Bahu Lao". The campaign attempted to stop Hindu girls from marrying non-Hindus. If RSS members get information of a Hindu girl planning to marry a Muslim man, then the RSS members would track the girl and would inform the parents of the girl accusing this to be a case of Love Jihad.
- Scroll.in's journalist Malini Subramaniam won the CPJ International Press Freedom Awards for 2016.
- Scroll.in's journalists won four Red Ink Awards for 2017 for Excellence in Journalism
- Scroll.in's journalist Mridula Chari was one of the winners of the Ramnath Goenka Excellence in Journalism Awards for 2017.
- TScroll.in won two Gold Awards in the WAN-IFRA South Asian Digital Media Awards 2018.
- Scroll.in's journalists Mridula Chari and Vinita Govindarajan again won the Ramnath Goenka Excellence in Journalism Awards for 2019 for their investigation into the use of toxic pesticides enabled by tax regulations.

== Readership ==
According to Forbes India, the monthly unique readership of the website was four million as of August 2016.

== See also ==
- Imphal Free Press
- Indian Ruminations
