= The News Minute =

Indian digital news platform

- Founded: 2014; 12 years ago
- Founder: Vignesh Vellore
- Country of origin: India
- Headquarters location: Bengaluru, India
- Official website: thenewsminute.com

The News Minute is an Indian digital news platform based in Bengaluru, Karnataka. It was founded by Vignesh Vellore who is also the current CEO in 2014. Apart from Karnataka, it also has bureaus in the states of Telangana, Andhra Pradesh, Tamil Nadu and Kerala.

== History ==
In a December 2015 interview with Sadhana Chathurvedula of Mint, Vignesh Vellore mentioned that the website has currently hired 12 people to work in it. The News Minute had secured an undisclosed amount of funding from Raghav Bahl's company. They raised second round of undisclosed amount in 2019. It plans to use those funds to hire more reporters and editors as well as expand its coverage. Vignesh Vellore stated that The News Minute aims to make use of User interface (UI) "so as to keep the audience more engaged with the content we publish."

== Notable people ==
- Dhanya Rajendran — Editor-in-chief and co-founder of The News Minute. She was previously with Times Now and The New Indian Express.
- Chitra Subramaniam — Former editor for The Hindu, known for her investigations on the Bofors scandal. She is also an Editorial Adviser for Republic TV.

== See also ==
- Imphal Free Press
- Indian Ruminations
