= K. Chakravarthi =

K. Chakravarthi may refer to:

- K. Chakravarthy, Indian music director and actor
- K. Chakravarthi (police officer), Indian Police Service officer
