= Kuldeep Sharma =

Kuldeep Sharma may refer to:

- Kuldeep Sharma (politician)
- Kuldeep Sharma (police officer)
