= Rana Ayyub =

Indian journalist and writer (born 1984)

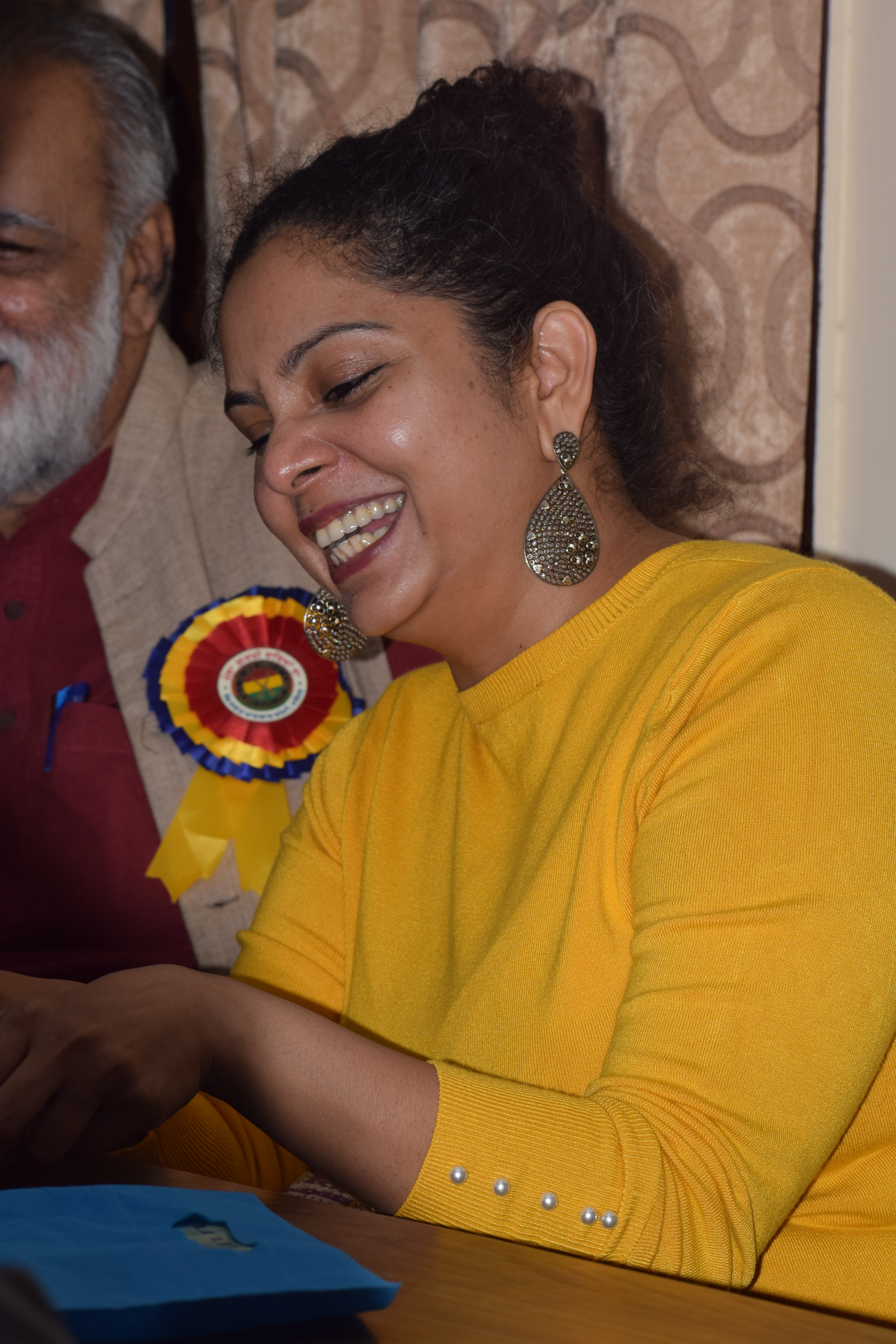
- Ayyub in 2017
- Born: 1 May 1984 (age 42); Bombay, Maharashtra, India
- Education: Sophia College
- Occupations: Journalist; columnist
- Relatives: Abdul Haq Azmi (uncle)

Rana Ayyub (born 1 May 1984) is an Indian journalist and opinion columnist with The Washington Post. She is author of the investigative book Gujarat Files: Anatomy of a Cover Up.

== Background and family ==
Rana Ayyub was born in Mumbai, India. Her father Mohammad Ayyub Waqif, was a writer with Blitz, a Mumbai-based magazine, and a member of the progressive writers movement. Her uncle, Abdul Haq Azmi, was a distinguished scholar of Hadith and served as a senior professor at Darul Uloom Deoband.

She contracted polio at the age of five, leaving her left hand and right leg immobile, and eventually recovered from the disease. When Mumbai witnessed riots in 1992–93, Ayyub's father was warned by a Sikh friend that local men were coming after his daughters. Rana, nine at the time, fled with her sister to stay with the Sikh friend's relatives for three months before reuniting with their family in Deonar, a Muslim-majority suburb, which is where she largely grew up. Ayyub is a practising Muslim.

She graduated in English literature from Sophia College, Mumbai where she was a classmate of Richa Chada and Shuchi Talati.

== Career ==
=== Investigative journalist at Tehelka ===
Ayyub worked for Tehelka (lit. "commotion/uproar"), a Delhi-based investigative and political news magazine. By her own account, a report by her was instrumental in sending Amit Shah, a close associate of Narendra Modi, to jail for several months in 2010.

At Tehelka, Ayyub worked as an investigative journalist and her big assignment was to carry out the sting operation upon which her book Gujarat Files was based. At the end of the sting operation, the management of Tehelka refused to publish any story written by Rana or based on the data collected by her. Ayyub continued to work with Tehelka for several months more. In November 2013, her boss Tarun Tejpal, the editor-in-chief and major shareholder of Tehelka, was accused of sexual harassment by one of his journalist subordinates. Ayyub resigned from Tehelka in protest against the organisation's handling of the charge against Tejpal. She now works independently.

=== Opinions writer at The Washington Post ===
In September 2019, Washington Post nominated Ayyub as Contributing Global Opinions Writer with the paper. In 2021, on the BBC show HARDtalk, Ayyub explained that she is in a position to express critical views about the government because she writes of international media, given that Indian media publications are censoring their journalists.

In October 2020, HarperCollins India published an open letter written by Ayyub, to protest the controversial appointment of Actor Gajendra Chauhan as the Chairman of Film and Television Institute of India (FTII), as part of the book Inquilab: A Decade of Protest which contains speeches, lectures and letters said to "capture the most important events and issues of the past ten years."

== Notable work ==
=== The Gujarat sting operation ===
As an investigative journalist working with Tehelka, Rana Ayyub took up a project to conduct a prolonged sting operation aimed at snaring politicians and government officials of Gujarat and get them to reveal any potential cover-ups regarding the Gujarat riots of 2002. Rana Posing as Maithili Tyagi, a filmmaker from the American Film Institute, and set about befriending her intended targets. She spent around ten months in disguise, and got paid a regular monthly salary from Tehelka during this period. However, at the end of the exercise, the management of Tehelka felt that the recordings which she had made over the months did not provide any new or sensational information, that the data gathered by her was of inadequate quality, and that they could not publish any story on the basis of the new data.

==== The book ====
In her book Gujarat Files: Anatomy of a Cover Up, Ayyub documented the verbatim transcripts of recordings, made using a concealed recording device, of many bureaucrats and police officers of Gujarat. The recordings were made in the course of an undercover investigation to reveal the views of bureaucrats and police officers on encounter killings and the aftermath of the 2002 Gujarat violence. Ayyub had been posing as 'Maithili Tyagi', a student of the American Film Institute, having an ideological affinity for the Rashtriya Swayamsevak Sangh's beliefs, to enable her to make the recordings.

==== Dispute with Tehelka ====
Tarun Tejpal and Shoma Chaudhury have disputed Ayyub's claim that her story on fake encounters in Gujarat, which was the result of an eight-month long undercover investigation, was dropped by them. According to Tejpal, Ayyub's story was "incomplete". According to Chaudhury, Ayyub's story "did not meet the necessary editorial standards." Ayyub has responded to Tejpal and Chaudhury's assertions by noting that:

I must say I am not the only one to complain about dropped stories in Tehelka, the list is fairly big… Shoma Choudhury and Tarun Tejpal of Tehelka cited editorial decisions and gaps. The book is a bestseller and is getting rave reviews for its content. Let the reader be the judge.

==== Reception ====
Historian Ramachandra Guha had called Ayyub's Gujarat Files "a brave book." Jyoti Malhotra has noted that many journalists have privately applauded Ayyub's courage in authoring Gujarat Files. Priya Ramani has commented: "The abuses from the paid foot soldiers on Twitter bounce off her spiral curls smoothly." Reflecting on the procedure used by Ayyub in composing Gujarat Files, Nilanjan Mukhopadhyay has observed: "Going undercover and interviewing many who had been in the thick of gruesome extra-constitutional operations required bravado and this must be appreciated."

Ayyub's investigation of the alleged Gujarat fake encounters has been listed by Outlook magazine as one of the twenty greatest magazine stories of all time across the world. In 2018, Ayyub was awarded the "most Resilient Global journalist" by Dutch non-profit Free Press Unlimited for resisting attempts to stifle her work.

In the Haren Pandya murder case, the Supreme Court of India dismissed Rana Ayyub's book, stating that "it is based upon surmises, conjectures, and suppositions and has no evidentiary value." Ayyub termed the court's comments "puzzling", stating that the CBI had used her work as evidence in other related cases, and noting that no officer or bureaucrat had denied her claims or taken her to court.

=== Reporting from Kashmir ===
In 2019, Ayyub accompanied Dexter Filkins from The New Yorker on a trip to Kashmir to report on the violence by the government towards the Kashmiri population following the revocation of the special status of Kashmir by the Modi-led Indian government. Their report of torture inflicted on the Kashmiri population, including minors, sharply contrasted with official accounts from the Indian state and state media, which portrayed the region as calm. Prior to their report, the Indian government's claims could not be verified due to a full communication blackout and a de facto curfew imposed in Kashmir.

== Controversies ==
=== Judicial proceedings ===
In February 2022, Ayyub received scrutiny after the Enforcement Directorate (ED) locked assets worth over ₹1.77 crore of hers. This was done in relation to a money laundering case filed against her, for allegedly embezzling funds she acquired from the public in the name of charity. ED stated that Ayyub had transferred those funds to other accounts for personal spendings.

The Income Tax Appellate Tribunal (ITAT) in Mumbai has pointed out that only 10 per cent of the COVID relief funds were used for relief work, and the rest of the funds were transferred to her father's and sister's accounts and then transferred again to her personal account.

The money laundering charges against Ayyub have been described as sham charges by international observers. According to commentators, the money laundering allegations are part of a broader campaign by the Indian authorities aimed at intimidating Ayyub and silencing her criticism of Modi's government.

FIR was filed against Ayyub in Dharwad due to her alleged comments against anti-hijab protestors as Hindu terrorists.

In 2022, UN experts have called on the Indian government to stop the judicial harassment against Ayyub, that included twice freezing Ayyub's bank account. The experts labelled the accusations related to the funds raised by Ayyub for pandemic relief work as "the bogus allegations [that] can be traced back to a far-right social media group." Washington Post extended support for Rana Ayyub, calls her ‘target of prejudiced investigations’.

The Delhi High Court while hearing a plea filed by advocate Amita Sachdeva on 30 March 2026, sought the deletion of six tweets between 2013 and 2017. These tweets were remarked by court on X (formerly Twitter) relating to Hindu deities and the Indian Army were “highly derogatory, inflammatory and communal”, the Delhi High Court Wednesday ordered removal and takedown of the same. Delhi’s Saket court in January 2025 had ordered an FIR against Ayyub on Sachdeva’s plea and held that the content was “prima facie” disclosing cognisable offences.

== Awards and recognition ==
- In October 2011, Rana Ayyub received the Sanskriti award for excellence in journalism.
- The 'Citation of Excellence' was conferred to Rana Ayyub in the 2017 edition of the Global Shining Light Award for her undercover investigation revealing state's top officials' complicity during the 2002 Gujarat Riots.
- Actress Richa Chadda claimed to have been inspired by Rana Ayyub, who is also her friend, in 2016 film Chalk n Duster, where she plays a journalist.
- In 2018, Ayyub was awarded the Most Resilient Journalist Award by Free Press Unlimited for continuing her work "despite being harassed both online and offline and receiving death threats."
- In 2019, Ayyub has been listed as one of ten global journalists who face maximum threats to their lives by the Time magazine.
- In February 2020, Ayyub was awarded with McGill Medal for journalistic courage at University of Georgia's Grady College.
- Ayyub is the 2020 Voices of Courage and Conscience Awardee from the Muslim Public Affairs Council of America.
- In 2021, Ayyub received the Excellence in International Journalism and Human Rights Award by Texas Tech University College of Media and Communication.
- In 2021, Ayyub was awarded the Overseas Press Club Award for best commentary on international news for her op-eds in The Washington Post.
- On 28 June 2022, Ayyub was awarded the International John Aubuchon Award by the National Press Club.
- On 23 October 2024, Ayyub was awarded Canadian Journalists for Free Expression (CJFE) International Press Freedom Award.

== Threats ==
Online violence against Ayyub is primarily driven by Twitter users aligned with Hindu nationalism and the ruling BJP. An International Center for Journalists (ICFJ) report found that Twitter has failed to address the abuse against her while withholding some of her tweets at the demand of the Indian Government. As per ICFJ's analysis, Ayyub receives abuse within 14 seconds of posting a tweet.

In 2018, Ayyub was at the receiving end of multiple death and rape threats on twitter. Her personal details were made public and a deepfake pornographic video was released. In April 2018 she filed a complaint with Delhi Police, who subsequently decided to close the case in August 2020 saying that "despite efforts the culprits could not be identified yet."

Several United Nations Special Rapporteurs, associated with the Human Rights Council have intervened in her case three times, warned of the "serious risk" to her life, and called on the authorities in India to "act urgently to protect" her from death threats following an online hate campaign. The US State department's 2020 Human Rights Report specifically mentions the online trolling and death threats faced by Ayyub. In its report documenting online attacks against journalists around the world, the international non-profit Reporters Without Borders discussed the hate speech unleashed against Ayyub and called on the government and Delhi police to protect her.

In 2022, Trads (members of Hindu nationalist alt-right groups) had created Bulli Bai, an app for fake online auction of Muslim women in India with intention to denigrate and harass the minorities. Ayyub and several prominent women journalists in India were targeted. They were also targeted with thousands of hate messages by the secret app Tek Fog allegedly used by the BJP supporters. The app was used to spread right wing propaganda online.

in November 2024, Ayyub was doxxed, and her phone number was leaked by a right-wing account on X. As a result, she received hundreds of calls and messages and states that she received no respite despite filing a complaint with the police.

In November 2025, Ayyub received threats of violence against her and her father from an unknown international number. Rana claimed that these threats were made to intimidate her into writing a column on the 1984 anti-Sikh riots that occurred after the assassination of Indian Prime Minister Indira Gandhi.
