= Pradeep Nirankarnath Sharma =

Administrative Officer

Indian Administrative Service
- In office 1981 – 2009 (Suspended)

Personal details
- Occupation: Multiple roles as Collector (DM) & Municipal Commissioner

Pradeep Nirankarnath Sharma is a former IAS officer of Gujarat. In 2013, he filed a petition in supreme court alleging that Narendra Modi had spied on an architect using state machinery and had called for a CBI probe into it.

He is facing at least five cases of corruption and is accused of illegal land allocation in Kutch and Bhuj.

== Family ==
He is brother of Kuldeep Sharma, a former IPS officer (ex-DIG, Gujarat) who had accused Amit Shah, then Home Minister of state of accepting a bribe of 2.5 crore to bail out a 1600 crore fraudster involving a bank of which Shah was the director.

== Career ==
Sharma held various administrative positions during his near thirty-year career including that of District magistrate, Bhuj, Kutch and Rajkot and as municipal commissioner of Jamnagar and Bhavnagar. A 2011 article by BBC (‘Gujarat's astonishing rise from rubble of 2001 quake’) credits Sharma of being instrumental in redeveloping the Bhuj region after the devastating 2001 earthquake. He was instrumental in faster rebuilding of streets and several public gardens.

== Stalk-gate/Snoopgate ==
In 2013, Sharma had alleged that Narendra Modi, the current Prime Minister of India, tailed and snooped upon a female architect with whom Modi had allegedly become obsessed, by misusing the Gujarat state machinery when Modi was then Chief Minister of Gujarat in 2009. Pradeep supported his allegations with audio tapes leaked by Cobrapost and Gulail.com. The tapes which are conversations between a police officer and Amit Shah, then Home Minister of Gujarat and the present home minister and close aide of Modi show, that every movement of the woman was tracked on the behest of some 'saheb' (master) where the "Saheb" is widely understood to be Modi. The allegations were refuted and instead Sharma was accused of having doubtful personality traits.

In April 2013, suspended IPS officer G.L. Singhl told Central Bureau of Investigation (CBI) that he was directed multiple times by Amit Shah to tail Pradeep Sharma. Singhl provided 267 clips of such conversations which show that the over-reaching surveillance was ordered and maintained by Amit Shah, the then home minister of Gujarat, on the female architect, her family and also the officer Sharma.

The accusations snowballed into a major controversy and embarrassment for the BJP, the current ruling party who had nominated Modi as prime ministerial candidate for 2014 Indian general elections. The Gujarat State agencies submitted in court & the BJP leaders accepted in public that snooping did happen which they said was done on behest of girl's father and with her knowledge. S.K. Saikia, the then police commissioner of Ahemdabad said in an interview that if such surveillance was legal, he should have had some paperwork for it.

== Arrests and charges ==
=== 2009 - First arrest ===
Pradeep sharma was first arrested on corruption charges by Gujarat police when he was Municipal commissioner, Bhavnagar but he later got bail. He was suspended in 2010 on corruption charges.

=== 2014 ===
In August 2014, he filed a petition in Supreme Court for a CBI probe into cases against him but his application was rejected. He has been since slapped with multiple cases of corruption which his family allege are because of his allegations.

He was arrested in October 2014 in a graft case by Anti-Corruption Bureau.

=== 2016—2018 ===
A case of money laundering was filed against him by Enforcement Directorate for and misusing his powers to allocate land to one M/S. Wellspun Company Ltd and to M/s Saw Pipes Ltd causing a loss of ₹1,20,30,824/- to the government. He was convicted of the crime on 08.01.2018 by an order passed by the Special Judge (PMLA), Ahmedabad, in PMLA Case No. 02 of 2016. This was consequently appealed in upper courts and decided per below.

=== 2025 ===
He was sentenced to two five-year imprisonments in aforementioned cases, first one in January (by Ahemdabad sessions court) over allotment of land to Welspun Group at alleged loss of 1.2 crore to the government and other in April (by Bhuj district court) over allotment of land to Saw Pipes Pvt Ltd in excess of legal limit of two hectares.

== Sources ==
- Jaffrelot, Christophe (1 March 2024). Gujarat Under Modi: Laboratory of Today's India. Oxford University Press. p. 130. ISBN 978-0-19-779052-6.
- Patel, Shirish; Revi, Aromar (26 July 2012). Recovering from Earthquakes: Response, Reconstruction and Impact Mitigation in India. Routledge. p. 200. ISBN 978-1-136-51807-2.
- Sardesai, Rajdeep (2015). 2014: The Election That Changed India. Penguin UK. p. 193. ISBN 978-81-8475-010-2.
