= R. B. Sreekumar =

Indian police officer

R.B. Sreekumar
- Occupation: Ex-Indian Police Service Officer
- Known for: Policing during 2002 Gujarat riots

R.B. Sreekumar is a former Gujarat State Director-General of Police.

== Personal life ==
Sreekumar, a native of Trivandrum District, is a grandson of the eminent freedom fighter, critique and journalist Balaramapuram G. Raman Pillai. Sreekumar completed his schooling and postgraduation in Thiruvananthapuram. joined the Indian Police Service (IPS) in 1971. Raman Pillai was the founder of the Travancore State Congress and used to publish the newspaper Navashakti. Sreekumar completed his post-graduation in history from Kerala University and was a professor in the university. A 1971 batch Indian Police Service (IPS) officer, Sreekumar joined Gujarat police forces in 1972 and continued till his retirement in 2007 as Additional director general of police. He joined Arvind Kejriwal's Aam Aadmi Party in 2014.

== 2002 Gujarat Riots ==
Sreekumar was Additional Director General of Police in charge of armed unit in Gujarat during Godhra Incident and was Intelligence DGP immediately after 2002 Gujarat riots took place. He is known for the affidavits he filed to Nanavati-Mehta Commission and presentation to James Michael Lyngdoh the then Chief Election Commissioner of India alleging dubious role of law and order in the riots. This led to cancellation of original proposal of early election in the state. In one of the affidavits he annexed transcripts of illegal tutoring by bureaucrats to him in clandestine recordings and a semi-official register maintained during his tenure as DGP - Intelligence apart from other evidences. The Times of India newspaper carried an exclusive news item based on his report to the Nanavati-Mehta Commission in which he claimed to have documented the state's connivance at the perpetration of riots. The Nanavati-Mehta Commission eventually rejected Sreekumar's testimony, as well as those of Rahul Sharma and Sanjiv Bhatt, saying they were disgruntled officers with personal grievances. The Special Investigation Team (SIT) that investigated riots, also, found all such claims to be false, which was endorsed by the Supreme Court.

Subsequently, he was denied promotion by Gujarat government to the rank of Director General of Police. He took his case to the Central Administrative Tribunal (CAT) that gave its ruling in September 2006 in his favour. However, this order was reversed by the Gujarat High Court in 2015. He was arrested by the Gujarat Police on 25 June 2022 on the charge of conspiring to falsely implicate innocent persons, after the Supreme Court said in an order dismissing a petition by Zakia Jafri that "it appears to us that a coalesced effort of the disgruntled officials of the State of Gujarat along with others was to create sensation by making revelations which were false to their own knowledge".

== ISRO Controversy ==
Sreekumar filed a defamation cases against Nambi Narayanan, along with BJP leaders Narendra Modi, Rajnath Singh and Meenakshi Lekhi, for trying to malign his name using false allegations about the ISRO spy case. Sreekumar further contended in that petition that he was Additional Director of Intelligence when Nambi Narayanan was arrested, and had no direct role in the criminal proceedings against him, which is supported by the Central Bureau of Investigation report of 2000 during Vajpayee government. And yet, Sreekumar contended, Nambi Narayanan alleged of mental and physical torture. Sreekumar or his counsels did not appear for the hearing and the case was dismissed.

In 2021, Supreme Court ordered the CBI to investigate allegations that Nambi Narayanan's espionage charges had been framed. In the FIR filed by CBI, RB Sreekumar was one of the 18 accused named in the case. Sreekumar was on deputation to IB when the espionage case against Narayanan was started. While he had denied any link with the case, Narayanan had named him as one of the conspirators.

== Books ==
- Gujarat Behind the Curtain
- The Diary of a Helpless Man
- Gujarat: Irakalkku vendi oru porattam (Malayalam)

== See also ==
- Kuldeep Sharma (Cop)
- Sanjiv Bhatt
- Haren Pandya
- Nambi Narayanan
