= K. N. Panikkar =

Indian historian (1936–2026)

- കെ.എൻ. പണിക്കർ
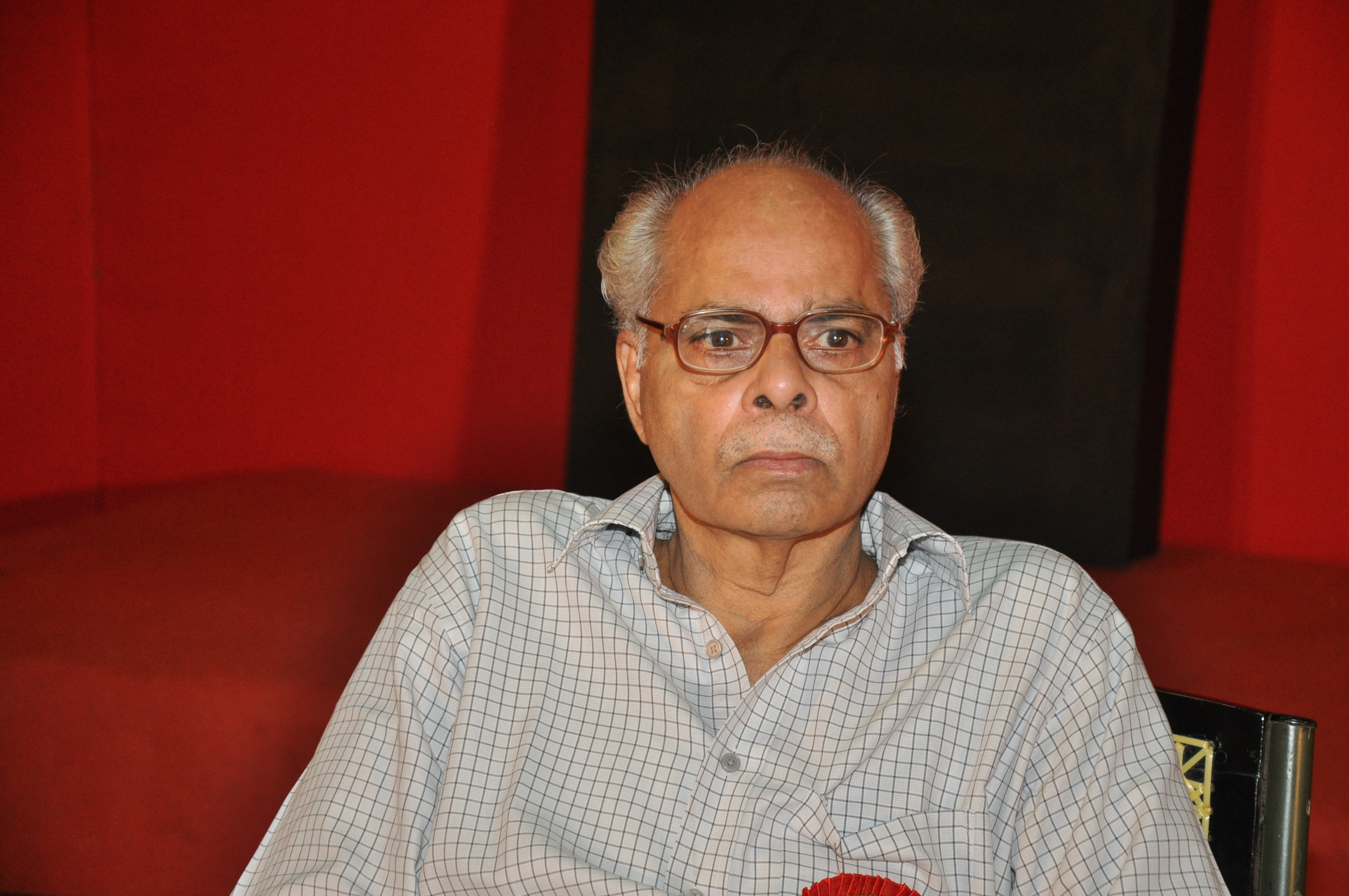
- Panikkar in 2012
- Born: 26 April 1936; Guruvayur, Malabar District, Madras Presidency, British India (now Thrissur district, Kerala, India)
- Died: 9 March 2026 (aged 89); Thiruvananthapuram, Kerala, India
- Education: Government Victoria College, Palakkad; University of Rajasthan
- Occupations: Historian; professor; writer
- Spouse: Usha Panikkar
- Children: 2

K. N. Panikkar (Malayalam: കെ.എൻ. പണിക്കർ, 26 April 1936 – 9 March 2026) was an Indian historian, associated with the Marxist school of historiography.

K. N. Panikkar wrote and edited a number of books, including A Concerned Indian’s Guide to Communalism and the ICHR volume on Towards Freedom, 1940: A Documentary History of the Freedom Struggle.

In 2010, he launched Indian Ruminations, an online portal in English, publishing literature and journalistic writings.

His methods and his expressed positions in public life have evoked harsh criticism from exponents of Hindu nationalism, particularly during the period of the Bharatiya Janata Party government of 1998 to 2004. Panikkar was active in criticising the rise of nationalist history in India. His books include Against Lord and State: Religion and Peasant Uprisings in Malabar; Culture and Consciousness in Modern India; Culture, Ideology and Hegemony – Intellectuals and Social Consciousness in Colonial India, and Before the Night Falls. He was appointed by the government of Kerala as chairman of an Expert Committee that looked into the complaints raised from various quarters concerning new textbooks introduced to state-supported schools. The committee submitted its report in October 2008.

Panikkar died on 9 March 2026, at the age of 89.

== See also ==
- M. G. S. Narayanan
- A. Sreedhara Menon
- Rajan Gurukkal

== Sources ==
- K N Panikkar, Attoor Ravi Varma bag Kerala Sahitya Akademi fellowships
- 'Will quit as Chancellor': Kerala Guv upset at state of higher education, writes to CM
- In JNU, works of Gail Omvedt and Dalit scholars are relegated to 'underground' networks
- Valiathan, Panikkar, Raghava Warrier get Kairali lifetime achievement awards
- When History is Held Hostage: Commemorating the Continuing Sufferings of the Mappila Martyrs of 1921
- Reform judiciary to protect its independence: Bhushan
- Muslims, Hindus and the Malabar rebellion – why 1921 matters
