= Sulli Deals =

2021 app harassing Muslim women

"Sulli Deals" (Note: The word "sulli" being a euphemism or slang term for Muslim females.) was a source-available app which contained photographs and personal information of some 100 Muslim women online. An FIR was filed by the Delhi Police with National Commission for Women India taking suo moto cognisance of the matter on 8 July 2021. The creator of the app was a BCA Student from Indore, Madhya Pradesh. On 9 January 2022, Thakur, who created the app to "defame" Muslim women, was arrested by the Delhi Police. Thakur was granted bail on 29 March by the court.

== Incident ==
On 4 July 2021, several pictures of Muslim women were posted on Twitter, where each was described as a "deal of the day". Several accounts spoke against the app, which was hosted on GitHub as a source-available project. After multiple complaints, GitHub took the app down and suspended the "sullideals" account which hosted the app.

In May 2021, a YouTuber named Liberal Doge "rated out of 10" Pakistani women in his livestream and some group of anonymous accounts harassed Hasiba Amin, the National Convenor of Congress IT Cell. According to analysts, the same group of people were behind the Sulli Deals app. However, Liberal Doge denied any connection with the Sulli Deals app.

== Reaction ==
Commentators have described the app as targeted harassment against Muslim women, with NCW taking suo moto cognizance over the matter and Delhi Police Cyber Cell registering an FIR under section 354-A. One of the targeted women, pilot Hina Khan, filed a separate FIR with Delhi Police under section 509 and section 66,67 of the IT Act. Shiv Sena MP Priyanka Chaturvedi wrote to the IT minister demanding strict and urgent action against the creators of the app. In addition, 56 MPs across party lines signed a letter to the home minister Amit Shah seeking redressal.

Congress MP Shashi Tharoor and AIMIM president Asaduddin Owaisi showed solidarity with the targeted women and assured that they would pursue the case to prevent further misuse of social media. More than 800 women-rights activists from all over India released a statement seeking action against the culprits.

Both GitHub and Twitter were criticized for failing to prevent further harassment of Muslim women after the auction fiasco and not taking quick action against the sullideals account. As of November 2021, the identity of the creator of the app was still unknown, with GitHub refusing to share data to Indian authorities through the usual CrPC notice.

On 6 January 2022, the Delhi Police said they were looking for the actual creator of the app through MLAT.

On 11 January 2022, the United Nations Special Rapporteur on Minority Issues, Fernand de Varennes, said, "Minority Muslim women in India are harassed and ‘sold’ in social media apps, #SulliDeals, a form of hate speech, must be condemned and prosecuted as soon as they occur. All Human Rights of minorities need to be fully and equally protected".

== Arrest ==
In January 2022, Delhi police arrested the creator of Sulli Deals, in Indore, Madhya Pradesh.

== Aftermath ==
In 2022, a similar app named Bulli Bai was created to auction Muslim women, in which the same Trad group was involved. Police arrested Neeraj Bishnoi, an engineering student, in the case.

In March 2022, Niraj Bishnoi was granted bail by the court.
