= Akshay H. Mehta =

Indian judge

Justice Akshay H. Mehta

Judge, Gujarat High Court
- In office 18 June 2001 – 14 December 2007

Personal details
- Born: 15 December 1945 (age 80) Vadodara, Gujarat
- Education: Maharaja Sayajirao University of Baroda

Akshay H. Mehta (born 15 December 1945) is a retired Indian judge of the Gujarat High Court.

== Early life and education ==
Mehta was born at Vadodara. His father Harshadray P. Mehta was an eminent lawyer of his time. He took his primary as well as secondary education in Rosary High School and a degree in law from Maharaja Sayajirao University of Baroda.

== Career ==
After getting enrolled at the bar, Mehta started practising law with his father in 1971 at Vadodara. In 1975, he shifted to Ahmedabad and started practice in Gujarat High Court on civil and criminal sides. He appeared in several inquiry commissions. In September, 1999 he was appointed as a senior Government of India Standing Counsel till his elevation as a judge.

== As a Judge ==
On 18 June 2001, Mehta was elevated to the post of additional judge of the Gujarat High Court. On 14 December 2007, he retired from this post. After the death of Justice K. G. Shah, who was a member of the Nanavati-Shah commission appointed to probe the Godhra train burning and the subsequent riots in the state, on 5 April 2008, the Gujarat High Court appointed Mehta to the commission.
