= Indian Ruminations =

Indian online portal

- Website type: literature and journalistic writings
- Available in: English
- Founder: Sandhya S.N
- Editor: Sandhya S.N
- Website: www.indianruminations.com
- Commercial: Noncommercial
- Launched: 2010
- Current status: Not Active

Indian Ruminations is an online portal in English, publishing literature and journalistic writings. Indian Ruminations was founded by Sandhya SN and launched by well-known historian Prof. K. N. Panikkar on May 16, 2010.

== Portal Content ==
- Featured Content
- Poetry
- Fiction
- Memoir
- Interview
- Reportage
- Opinion Article
- Research Article
- Book Review
- Essays on Film and Theatre

== Indian Ruminations Literature Festival ==
Indian Ruminations organized two International Literature Festivals in the years 2011 and 2016. Both the events were held in Thiruvananthapuram and showcased writers from across the world. The first edition of the festival held during 24–25 September 201was inaugurated by the Indian English writer, Anita Nair. A national anthology of poetry, consisting of 40 poems from poets across the country, was released on the occasion. The second edition of the Indian Ruminations literature festival held during 27–28 December 2014, was inaugurated by the Malayalam poet and linguistic scholar, Prof. Puthussery Ramachandran. The festival was organized in collaboration with India-Inter-Continental Cultural Association. Apart from Indian writers and literature enthusiasts, the festival was attended by delegates from countries like Bangladesh, Croatia, Kazakhstan, South Africa, United Kingdom, United States of America and Uzbekistan.

== Samaagati International Interdisciplinary conference 2017 ==
Indian Ruminations collaborated with Samaagati Trust to conduct the Samaagati International Interdisciplinary conference of 2017. The focal theme of the conference held during May 12–14, 2017 was 'Nationalism:Discourse and Contestation'. This event was the first collaboration between Indian Ruminations and Samaagati prior to the takeover of Indian Ruminations by the Trust. The event held at Thiruvananthapuram was inaugurated by the author and literary critic B. Rajeevan and the keynote address was delivered by Rana Ayyub, former journalist at Tehelka and the author of Gujarat Files. Research Scholars and Professors from across the nation presented their research papers in the conference. In 2020, Indian Ruminations was taken over by Samaagati Trust, a non-profit organization promoting social progress through cultural and academic activities. The trust functions with a motive to promote the cultural, social, educational and economic welfare of the society. The trust undertakes activities such as conducting research, organizing capacity building programmes, promoting academic discussions and book publishing.
