= K. Chakravarthi (police officer) =

Former Director General of Police of Gujarat

K Chakravarthi (1947 - 4 August 2020) was an Indian Police Service officer who served as the Director General of Police (DGP) of Gujarat from 1 April 2001 to 31 January 2004. His tenure is notably marked by the 2002 Gujarat riots, one of the most significant and tragic events in the Gujarat history. He died on 4 August 2020, at the age of 73, due to cancer.

== 2002 Gujarat riots ==
R. B. Sreekumar, the additional DGP of the Gujarat police, stated that Chakravarthi disclosed to him that Modi had told the police in a meeting, “In communal riots, police normally take action against Hindus and Muslims in a one-to-one proportion. This will not do now; allow Hindus to give vent to their anger.”
