= Sanjiv Bhatt =

Former Indian police officer

- Born: 21 December 1963 (age 62); Bombay, India
- Education: IIT Bombay
- Spouse: Shweta Bhatt
- Police career
- Country: India
- Allegiance: Indian Police Service
- Status: resigned

Sanjiv Bhatt is a former Indian Police Service officer of the Gujarat cadre. He is known for his role in filing an affidavit in the Supreme Court of India against the then Chief Minister of Gujarat, Narendra Modi, concerning Modi's alleged role in the 2002 Gujarat riots. He claimed to have attended a meeting, during which Modi allegedly asked top police officials to let Hindus vent their anger against the Muslims. However, the Special Investigation Team appointed by the Supreme Court of India concluded that Bhatt did not attend any such meeting, and dismissed his allegations.

In 2015, Bhatt was removed from the police service, on the grounds of "unauthorised absence". In October 2015, the Supreme Court quashed Bhatt's plea for constituting a special investigation team (SIT) for cases filed against him by Gujarat Government. The court lifted a stay on his trial in these cases and asked him to face prosecution. The court observed that, "Bhatt was in active touch with leaders of rival political parties, was being tutored by NGOs, was involved in politics and activism of creating pressure, even upon 3-judge bench of this court, amicus and many others". On 20 June 2019, he was sentenced to life imprisonment by the Sessions Court of Jamnagar District in the state of Gujarat in a 1990 custodial death case. On 27 March 2024, Bhatt was convicted by Palanpur Sessions Court in a drug peddling case.

== Early life ==
Bhatt describes himself as a Kashmiri Pandit. He earned an MTech degree from the Indian Institute of Technology, Bombay in 1985. He is married to Shweta Bhatt.

== Police career ==
Bhatt joined the Indian Police Service (IPS) in 1988, and was allotted the Gujarat cadre. In 1990, as the Additional Superintendent of Police, he detained 150 people in order to control a riot in Jamnagar district. Prabhudas Vaishnani, one of the detainees, died of kidney failure a few days later, after being hospitalised. His brother lodged an FIR against Bhatt and six other policemen, alleging that he had been tortured in police custody. Another man, Vijaysinh Bhatti, alleged that he had been beaten up by Bhatt.

In 1996, as the Superintendent of Police (SP) of Banaskantha district, he was accused of falsely framing a Rajasthan-based lawyer in a narcotics case. It was alleged that Bhatt maliciously filed nearly 40 petitions in the high courts of Rajasthan and Gujarat as well as before the apex court to delay action against him. The Bar association members have alleged that Bhatt got himself appointed the Gujarat government's officer in-charge for the special appeal petition pending in the SC. They pointed out that Bhatt was using the Gujarat government as a shield to save himself but was also misusing the public money to fight the crimes he committed.

He was accused in another custodial torture case in 1998.

=== 2002 transfer ===
From December 1999 to September 2002, he worked as Deputy Commissioner of Intelligence in the state Intelligence Bureau (India) at Gandhinagar. He was responsible for looking after the state's internal security, border and coastal security, and security of vital installations. He was also responsible for the Chief Minister Narendra Modi's security. During this period, the Godhra train burning and the subsequent Hindu-Muslim riots led to over a thousand deaths in February–March 2002.

On 9 September 2002, Narendra Modi allegedly mocked the high Muslim birth rates during a speech at Bahucharaji. Though Modi denied making such remarks, the National Commission for Minorities (NCM) sought a report from the State Government. Modi's Principal Secretary P K Mishra told The Indian Express that the State Government had no recordings or transcripts of the speech, and therefore, could not send these to the NCM. However, the State Intelligence Bureau provided the NCM a copy of Modi's speech, which had been recorded as part of routine procedure. Subsequently, the Modi government transferred the Bureau's senior officials on 'punishment postings'. The officers transferred included Sanjiv Bhatt, R. B. Sreekumar and E. Radhakrishnan. Bhatt was posted as principal of the State Reserve Police Training College.

=== Sabarmati Jail ===
In 2003, Bhatt was posted as the superintendent of Sabarmati central jail. There, he became very popular among the prisoners. He introduced desserts like gajar ka halwa on the jail menu. He also posted undertrials in Godhra train burning case on a jail committee. Two months after his appointment, he was transferred for being too friendly with the prisoners and bestowing favours upon them. On 18 November 2003, nearly half of the 4000 prisoners went on a hunger strike to protest his transfer. Six convicts slashed their wrists in protest.

By 2007, Bhatt's colleagues from the 1988 batch had been promoted to the rank of Inspector-general of police (IGP). However, Bhatt had stayed at the SP level for a decade without any promotion, because of the pending criminal cases and departmental inquiries against him.

== Allegations against Gujarat Government and Narendra Modi (incumbent Chief Minister) ==
=== Affidavit against Narendra Modi ===
After the 2002 riots, a group of social activists had formed the Concerned Citizens Tribunal to analyse the riots. Gujarat's home minister Haren Pandya allegedly told this tribunal that Modi had organised a meeting at the Chief Minister's residence on 27 February 2002, after the Godhra train burning, in which over 63 Hindu pilgrims were killed. According to Pandya, in this meeting, Modi had asked the police officials not to come in the way of "the Hindu backlash". Pandya had named several police officials who attended this meeting; Bhatt was not among these. Pandya was later assassinated by unidentified men.

On 14 April 2011, 9 years after the riots, Bhatt filed an affidavit in the Supreme Court of India, making similar allegations. According to Bhatt, at this meeting on 27 February 2002, Modi asked top police officials to let Hindus "vent out their anger" against the Muslims. He said that the meeting determined to bring the bodies of the Hindu pilgrims to Ahmedabad before cremation and that he had cautioned against this, fearing religious violence. According to him, Modi's Bharatiya Janata Party (BJP) and the Hindu nationalist Bajarang Dal were stirring tensions in the city, and the Vishwa Hindu Parishad (VHP) had proposed a bandh (an illegal general strike). Bhatt claimed that the then Director General of Police, K. Chakravarthi, and the city Police Commissioner, P. C. Pandey, had raised concerns regarding the manpower available to deal with this, and both men advised that it was not wise for the bodies to be taken to Ahmedabad. Bhatt also says that he sent some fax messages to major officials soon after the meeting ended and that these referred to the meeting itself, the decision regarding the bodies of the dead and the growing activity of the BJP and Bajrang Dal. Subsequently, riots occurred in which around 1000 people died, three-quarters of whom were Muslim. Described as a whistleblower both by some of the Indian media and some pressure groups, Bhatt has since referred to the events as "state-sponsored riots" and has alleged both that Modi told his officials to be "indifferent" towards rioters and said that Muslims needed to be "taught a lesson".

In his affidavit, Bhatt mentioned six witnesses, who could testify his presence in the alleged meeting held at Modi's residence. He claimed that he had travelled to Modi's residence in the official car of K. Chakravarthi, which was being driven by Tarachand Yadav; Bhatt's driver Constable KD Panth followed them in Bhatt's official car. Bhatt's affidavit was signed by KD Panth, whose statement supported Bhatt's presence at the alleged meeting. On 24 June 2011, Panth filed an FIR against Bhatt, alleging that Bhatt had threatened him and forced him to sign a false affidavit. Panth alleged that Bhatt took him to the residence of Arjun Modhwadia, the state president of the opposition party, Indian National Congress. He further alleged that Modhwadia asked him to obey Bhatt. Panth claimed that he was on leave in February 2002, when the riots broke out, and had already told this to the Supreme Court-appointed Special Investigation Team (SIT). Chakravarthi also denied that Bhatt was present in the meeting.

However, Tarachand Yadav supported Bhatt, stating that he had driven Bhatt to Modi's bungalow, and that Panth had been with them. He also supported Bhatt's claim that he travelled there with Chakravarthy.

When questioned why he had not made these revelations earlier, Bhatt stated that in 2004, he "started sending out feelers" that he wanted to be cross-examined by the Nanavati Commission, but the commission had not called him. In May 2011, Bhatt repeated the allegations made in his affidavit when he was called to give evidence to the NMC. Before this appearance and to support the statements that he would make during it, Bhatt had attempted to obtain documents as evidence from the police and the State Intelligence Bureau, as well as from the SIT hearing. He again requested this information in December 2011, claiming that it was needed so that it could be placed on the official record. These requests for information failed, and Bhatt alleged that this was because the Modi government opposed them because it was involved in a "cover-up". In 2012, he alleged that the NMC had consistently refused to demand production of the documents, despite Bhatt's belief that it has the legal powers to do so.

Bhatt's ex-boss R. B. Sreekumar stated that Bhatt had never told him about his presence at the meeting during these nine years. But he told the Nanavati Commission that in 2002, the Modi government had asked the State Intelligence Bureau to tap Haren Pandya's phone to confirm that he was the minister who talked to the Concerned Citizens Tribunal.

=== Allegations against SIT ruled baseless ===
In March 2008, the Supreme Court had appointed a Special Investigation Team (SIT), headed by former Central Bureau of Investigation chief R. K. Raghavan, to investigate cases relating to the various incidents that had occurred during the 2002 riots. One of those who died in the Gulbarg Society massacre that formed a part of the riots was Ehsan Jaffri, the former Indian National Congress Member of Parliament. His widow, Zakia Jaffri, subsequently became concerned about the involvement of senior officials in allegedly aiding and abetting the rioters and by the lack of legal action against them by the police. She petitioned the Court, alleging criminal conspiracy, a "deliberate and intentional failure" to protect life and property, and failure to fulfil their constitutional duty. In 2009, the Court responded by directing the SIT to investigate the actions of Modi and 62 other people, including Pandey and some VHP leaders. Bhatt presented evidence to this particular SIT investigation in 2009.

In his 2011 affidavit, Bhatt accused the SIT of trying to "hide the truth behind the riots". Bhatt alleged that a mole in SIT leaked information to the Modi Government, through Gujarat's additional advocate general Tushar Mehta. Mehta and Bhatt were good friends since the 1980s, until 2010. Bhatt claimed that he happened to access Mehta's account to book two vacations for their families: one to Goa in September 2009 and another to the US in May–June 2010. At that time, he claims, he saw emails from SIT in Mehta's inbox. Mehta alleged that their friendship ended because of something that happened during their 2010 vacation in the US; he refused to go into details calling it a personal affair. In August 2011, Mehta lodged a complaint against Bhatt, accusing him of hacking into his email account. Bhatt's wife Shweta denied the accusation, stating that her husband only helped Mehta because the latter was not good with computers.

The Court had previously appointed Raju Ramachandran to act as amicus curiae (friend of the court). Ramachandran had reviewed the original confidential SIT report that had been submitted in November 2010. His report was also confidential but prompted the Court to order the SIT to conduct a self-review. That self-review had been submitted in April 2011 and the Court referred this for consideration by Ramachandran in May, which was also when it refused to accept Bhatt's affidavit.

In June 2011, Bhatt filed a Public-interest litigation (PIL) in the Supreme Court, calling for an independent agency to investigate the riots or, alternatively, for the case to be transferred outside Gujarat. Bhatt also alleged that his emails had been hacked and filed a complaint against the state alleging that they had been leaked from the SIT.

On 13 October 2015, a bench comprising Supreme Court Chief Justice H L Dattu and Justice Arun Mishra ruled Bhatt's allegations against the SIT as totally "false and baseless". It further rebuked Bhatt, ruling that "He had exchanged e-mails with rival political party leaders and was being tutored by the lawyer of an NGO and its activist... The petitioner has even sent e-mails to influence the judicial proceedings of a 3-Judge Bench of this court and has tried to influence the amicus curiae."

=== Suspension ===
On 8 August 2011, the Gujarat government suspended Bhatt, accusing him of unauthorised absence from duty, not appearing before an inquiry committee and using his official car while not on duty.

Bhatt claimed that he was unable to report for work because he was required to attend various legal and investigatory hearings, including those of Nanavati-Mehta commission (NMC) – originally known as the Nanavati-Shah Commission – which had been established by the government of Gujarat.

== Allegations in Haren Pandya murder case ==
The Gujarat government had originally appealed the court to drop charges against Bhatt and other policemen in the 1990 custodial death case. However, after Bhatt's affidavit against Modi, the Government withdrew its application, and the court initiated criminal proceedings against the policemen. On 18 September 2011, the Gujarat Home Ministry chargesheeted Bhatt in the 1990 police atrocity case. On 27 September 2011, Bhatt appeared before the Gujarat High Court in the police atrocity case against him in Jamnagar district. During the hearing, he told the Court that Narendra Modi and his former Home Minister Amit Shah had pressurised him to destroy crucial evidence in the Haren Pandya murder case.

In a fresh affidavit, Bhatt made detailed allegations against Modi and Shah. He claimed that while posted as Superintendent of the Sabarmati Jail in 2003, he had met Asgar Ali, an accused in the Haren Pandya murder case. Ali allegedly told him that Pandya had been killed by Tulsiram Prajapati (who was later killed in a fake encounter in 2006). Bhatt claimed that he had immediately informed Home Minister Amit Shah about this revelation, but Shah asked him to destroy all documentary evidence related to this matter. He claimed that he had been removed as the Jail Superintendent because he had refused to obey Shah.

== Arrest ==
On 30 September 2011, Bhatt was arrested, following an investigation into KD Panth's FIR. Bhatt alleged that Panth was following "diktats" from the Modi government, an allegation denied by Panth. Bhatt's arrest was condemned by the Congress leaders and human rights activists, who accused the Modi government of persecuting Bhatt. The arrest gave rise to protests at places such as Ahmedabad, Delhi and Bangalore. The Gujarat IPS Officers Association also expressed their support for Bhatt and his family, although this was far from being unanimous and was downplayed by various senior officers. Bhatt has referred to being harassed by members of the Gujarat police.

On 17 October 2011, Bhatt was granted bail by a local court in Ahmedabad, on condition that he continue to cooperate with investigations into the allegations laid against him. His bail application had been opposed by the Modi government. The Supreme Court suspended the case in April 2012, with Bhatt arguing that the arrest was "politically motivated".

Bhatt was among those who refused to accept an award offered by the Maulana Muhammad Ali Jauhar Academy in 2011. This was because one of the co-awardees, Jagdish Tytler, is alleged to have been involved in the 1984 anti-Sikh riots.

== Convictions ==
In November 2012, Bhatt and six other policemen were charged with murder in the 1990 custodial death case of Prabhudas Vaishnani. On 20 June 2019, he was sentenced to life in relation to this case.

On 27 March 2024, Bhatt was convicted by Palanpur Sessions Court in a drug peddling case. The case against him was of falsely implicating a lawyer on charges of possessing around a kilogram of drugs in 1996 when Bhatt was the Superintendent of Police in Banaskantha. On 29 April 2025, the Supreme Court dismissed his plea for bail and suspension of his life sentence in the 1990 custodial death case.

== Supreme Court ==
A former BBC journalist, Shubhranshu Choudhary, filed an affidavit in November 2011 that supported the claim that Bhatt was present at the 2002 meeting. In the same month, he requested that the SIT allow his testimony to be recorded in the presence of a magistrate as he believed that his earlier statements to it had been distorted. He made several similar requests thereafter.

In January 2012, the SIT demanded the original copy of the fax messages that Bhatt claimed to have sent after the 2002 meeting and which, according to Bhatt, substantiated his presence at the meeting. Bhatt said that he had already provided the evidence in 2009 and again in 2011. He also noted that the SIT could get the information from the SIB records, and he claimed that the SIT was failing to interview police officials who could testify to his movements on the night in question. This was not the first occasion that he had alleged the SIT was reluctant to examine key witnesses who could verify his whereabouts at the time of the meeting.

Bhatt has produced evidence of police inaction to SIT chairman along with a letter which had details of deployment of police, SRP and RAF in the state, areas under curfew, types of crimes committed during the riots, etc. In that letter he also alleged delayed deployment of army. He insisted that those documents were intended for the sole purpose of ensuring that crucial evidence is not disregarded or concealed by the SIT with a view to screen powerful and influential offenders from legal punishment". In a letter written to SIT, Bhatt alleged that the probe team didn't exhume the bodies from well of Naroday Patia despite strong evidences catered by him to support his claim. He also complained that Ahmedabad police commissioner P. C. Pandey was alerted to the same.

In February 2012, Bhatt accused the SIT of destroying evidence in collusion with the Gujarat government. Bhatt once again wrote to the NMC, seeking state intelligence and police records, documents and log books pertaining to Godhra riots as he apprehended the remaining records too might be destroyed by the Government.

He also claimed before the panel that Modi only gave misleading answers and the investigation officer didn't contradict or confront him with all evidence that was available at his disposal.

Bhatt suggested in March 2012 that the final report of the NMC should be submitted to the governor of Gujarat rather than to its chief minister, Modi. He also thought that the earlier NMC report, which concerned the Godhra train incident and had been produced in 2008, should be recalled from the chief minister and presented instead to the governor. The basis for his request was that Modi's actions formed a part of the terms of reference of the enquiry and that "no person shall be a judge in his own cause". He also criticised the earlier report, in which the NMC had exonerated Modi of any wrongdoing in relation to the riots. Bhatt believed that the NMC lacked the official authority to make such a statement. He also criticised the failure of the NMC to summon Modi to appear before it, and a few days later he requested that Modi should be summoned on the basis of an affidavit that had been filed with the commission by the late Amarsinh Chaudhary, a former Gujarat Chief Minister, in 2002. Bhatt claimed that the affidavit showed that Chaudhary had met with Modi during the period of the riots because he was concerned about reports of events in the Gulbarg Society, including the situation of Ehsan Zafri. According to Bhatt, the affidavit records that Chaudhary had found Modi to be not very "responsive" when they met and that he had received reports that the police were not acting as they should during the events.

=== Supreme Court ruling ===
Bhatt had filed a plea before the Supreme Court seeking a special investigative probe into two First Information Reports filed against him by the Gujarat Police. The first FIR was for forcing his official driver, K D Panth, a subordinate officer, to file a false affidavit that he had transported Bhatt on 27 February 2002 to Chief Minister Narendra Modi's residence where Bhatt alleged that Modi had instructed officers to allow riots following the Godhra train carnage. The second FIR was that he had hacked the email of a law enforcement official, namely Tushar Mehta, then additional advocate general of Gujarat. In his plea before the court, Bhatt asserted that both FIRs filed against him were politically motivated and should be probed by a Supreme Court monitored investigative team to uncover abuse of power by the Modi government.

On 13 October 2015, a bench comprising Chief Justice H L Dattu and Justice Arun Mishra dismissed Bhatt's plea and ordered a speedy trial to be conducted in both cases. It used email evidence to rule that Bhatt had deliberately colluded with leaders of the opposition Congress Party, NGO activists and certain elements in the media to furnish false evidence about his attendance at 27 February 2002 meeting chaired by Modi so that he could falsely allege that Modi had incited riots."The exchange of emails which are self-explanatory indicate that the petitioner was in active touch with leaders of rival political party, NGOs, their lawyers, tried to play media card, and was being tutored by NGOs. The manner in which he acted is apparent from the aforesaid emails and need not be repeated. Petitioner had probably forgotten that he was senior IPS officer," the bench said. Referring to his past conduct, the bench said there were three departmental inquiries pending against him and he was also accused of committing atrocities on peaceful and innocent villagers in Jamjodhpur which resulted in the death of one person. The court said Bhatt had also invoked the provisions of TADA during his tenure. Moreover, the Court condemned Bhatt's conduct as underhanded and unbefitting of a senior police officer.

The Supreme Court on 14 October 2015 cleared the way for criminal prosecution of sacked IPS officer Sanjiv Bhatt for allegedly hacking the email account of the then additional advocate general of Gujarat Tushar Mehta and for forcing a junior police official to file a false affidavit in a Gujarat riots case.

== Other issues ==
Bhatt's allegation on inaction of police officers upon instruction from Modi was also supported by K. S. Subramanian who was a member of fact finding team led by former Supreme Court Justice V. R. Krishna Iyer. His conclusion was the outcome of his interaction with former Gujarat police chief Chakravarthy and P.C. Pandey who was then Ahmedabad police commissioner.

At a convention marking the tenth anniversary of the Godhra, Bhatt said that he is unable to see any justice for the victims of riots. Bhatt was issued summon by National Commission for Minorities along with other retired and serving police officers of Gujarat to testify the role of Modi to bring out the truth of 27 February 2002 meeting which held at Modi's home. The summon was issued to Bhatt on the basis of a complaint filed by Niyazbibi Malek.

Bhatt contacted Pratibha Patil, the Indian President, in April 2012. He sought a probe against Modi. He has requested the centre to appoint two member commission to enquire the role and conduct of Modi, his officials and police officers in the Godhra massacre. He also demanded an investigation into the government's measures on the rehabilitation for victims.

The SIT released all details of its investigations related to the Jaffri complaint of complicity on 7 May 2012, following deposition of its final report with the courts. The release included the two reports of Ramachandran, the amicus, that had been submitted in January and July 2011. The documents revealed that the SIT believed that Bhatt had not been present at the meeting and that this was supported both by statements from those who had been present and by analysis of Bhatt's telephone records, which suggested that he was in Ahmedabad at the time. The SIT also found that the fax message that Bhatt claimed to have sent never existed and he concocted it later and the signatures of his superior officers were forged. Their preliminary report did note that there was a lack of credibility among the witnesses present at the meeting, some of whom had retired and were claiming either a loss of memory or had been in receipt of retirement benefits that might impact upon their neutrality. In addition, the SIT considered Bhatt to be an unreliable witness who had attempted to coach other witnesses, had not provided adequate explanation for his nine-year silence regarding the events surrounding the meeting and had been imprecise in his description of the events. They also though that he had "an axe to grind" against the state.

The Ramachandran reviews painted a different picture. He queried how the SIT could rely on the testimony of witnesses who were present at the meeting when the investigation had itself raised doubts concerning their credibility, and he provided a rationale that could explain Bhatt's presence despite his relatively low rank. He also disputed the SIT conclusions regarding the telephone records analysis and said that the matter of presence needed to be tested in court because the evidence available was insufficient to discount Bhatt's claim. Bhatt had claimed that there were two meetings on the day in question, at different times. Ramachandran's reports also showed that he thought that, if they were true, the alleged statements made by Modi were actionable in law and that the veracity of those allegations should also be tested in court. Ramachandran accepted that Bhatt had not acted in a manner consistent with his official duties but noted that

In my opinion, despite the aforesaid background, it does not appear very likely that a serving police officer would make such a serious allegation against Mr. Modi, the Chief Minister of the State, without some basis. There is no documentary material of any nature whatsoever which can establish that Shri Bhatt was not present in the meeting on 27.02.2002.

There were other differences of opinion between the SIT and Ramachandran but there were also points upon which they agreed. One of these was that the murdered Haren Pandya, who had been the Gujarat Home Minister at the time of the riots but later had a falling out with Modi, could not have been at the meeting and therefore could not have vouched for Bhatt's presence there, as had been claimed by a former judge in February 2012.

Shweta Bhatt contested unsuccessfully against Modi in the 2012 state assembly elections.

After the official release of the Amicus curiae's report, The Times of India described Bhatt as pivot in the case against Modi. Bhatt criticised the published SIT report on the Godhra attack, claiming that the SIT was shielding Modi. Besides his deposition before NCM, Bhatt has filed an affidavit in National Commission of Minorities (NCM).In his affidavit Bhatt has asked the rights panel to initiate action against the SIT headed by R K Raghavan for incorrectly recording his statements or tweaking them to give a clean chit to Chief Minister Narendra Modi. He also alleged that certain very crucial portions of his statement, including the timings of extremely consequential meetings with the chief minister Narendra Modi on 27 February & 28 February 2002, have either been incorrectly recorded or deliberately tweaked by the SIT, possibly with the ulterior motive and intent of shielding certain powerful persons including the chief minister from legal punishment.

== Personal safety ==
Concerns have been raised at various times regarding the personal safety of Bhatt. At the time of filing his Supreme Court affidavit in April 2011, Bhatt requested the Court for protection and the Gujarat government assured the Supreme Court that it would provide personal safety arrangements. This situation had arisen because Bhatt believed that the SIT had passed on his testimony to the state government and thus he feared for the security of himself and his family.

His wife, Shweta, alleged that there was harassment during the period that he spent in jail under arrest in October 2011. She requested that the Ministry of Home Affairs (MHA) of the Government of India intervene to ensure that both he and his family were protected. The MHA instructed the government of Gujarat accordingly.

Bhatt had been provided with two personal guards but considered this to be insufficient. In November 2011 he requested improved security, including provision of a bullet proof car. He repeated his demands in February 2012, when he also raised objections on personal safety grounds to a request from the Gujarat police that he should return his service revolver.

In November 2013 Bhatt alleged that city police was not providing him adequate security, and there was an increased threat to his and his family members' lives from the "right-wing fundamentalists and the supporters of Narendra Modi". Earlier, Bhatt had alleged that his security had been downsized. The office of Commissioner of Police Shivanand Jha said that after the assessment of threat perception, it was decided that Bhatt should be provided with two armed personal security officers. However, Bhatt wrote to the commissioner, saying that he was being "provided with only one armed PSO".

== Removal from service ==
Bhatt was removed from the IPS on 19 August 2015 on the grounds of "unauthorised absence".

== See also ==
- Kuldeep Sharma (Cop)
- R. B. Sreekumar
