= K. M. Abraham (civil servant) =

Indian Administrative Service Officer

Dr. K. M. Abraham

Chief Secretary, Government of Kerala
- In office August 2017 – December 2017
- Governor: P. Sathasivam
- Chief Minister: Pinarayi Vijayan
- Preceded by: Nalini Netto IAS
- Succeeded by: Paul Antony IAS

Personal details
- Born: 3 May 1958 (age 68) Kollam, Kerala, India
- Education: University of Kerala; IIT Kanpur; University of Michigan
- Occupation: Bureaucrat; Financial analyst
- Awards: Satyendra K. Dubey Memorial Award

Kandathil Mathew Abraham (born 3 May 1958) is an Indian bureaucrat and retired IAS officer, who was the Chief Principal Secretary to the Chief Minister of Kerala. He also served as the chief executive officer of the Kerala Infrastructure Investment Fund Board (KIIFB) and Executive Vice Chairperson of Kerala Development and Innovation Strategic Council. He retired as the Chief Secretary of Kerala in December 2017. He belongs to the 1982 batch of IAS. He was instrumental in bringing out the Sahara Group Scam when he was a member of the Securities and Exchange Board of India.

== Education ==
Abraham obtained a Bachelor of Technology (B.Tech.) degree in Civil Engineering from the University of Kerala and a Master of Technology (M.Tech.) degree in Industrial Management from the Indian Institute of Technology Kanpur. He later earned a Doctor of Philosophy (Ph.D.) degree in Technology Policy from the University of Michigan through its Urban, Technology and Environment Program (UTEP).

He is a Chartered Financial Analyst (CFA) and has also completed the Licensed International Financial Analyst (LIFA) certification. In addition, he holds a Diploma in Business Finance from the Institute of Chartered Financial Analysts of India (ICFAI), Hyderabad. He is also a member of Global Association of Risk Professionals (GARP).

Abraham has completed online coursework in areas including neural networks and deep learning, probabilistic graphical models, machine learning, big data, the Hadoop platform and application framework, and programming in R and Python.

== Career ==
Abraham began his career as a lecturer in Civil Engineering at TKM College of Engineering under the University of Kerala. After joining the Indian Administrative Service (IAS) in 1982, he served as Assistant Collector (Under Training) in Kollam district and subsequently as Sub Collector in Ernakulam and Thiruvananthapuram districts.

He served as District Collector of Alappuzha and Ernakulam districts between 1994 and 1996. During this period, he briefly officiated as Mayor of the Kochi Municipal Corporation.

From 1996 to 2002, Abraham served as Secretary in the Finance Department of the Government of Kerala. During his tenure, the state implemented the Modernising Government Programme (MGP), a governance and fiscal reform initiative supported by the Asian Development Bank (ADB), with supplementary assistance from the Government of the Netherlands and the United Kingdom's Department for International Development (DFID). Management information systems for budgeting and treasury operations were introduced during this period. In 1999, he drafted legislation for the establishment of the Kerala Infrastructure Investment Fund, which later evolved into the Kerala Infrastructure Investment Fund Board (KIIFB).

Between 2003 and 2007, Abraham served as Visiting Faculty in the Department of Industrial and Management Engineering at the Indian Institute of Technology Kanpur. In 2006, he took a sabbatical from government service and served for one year as Professor of Finance at the Asian School of Business, Thiruvananthapuram.

He subsequently held positions as Secretary and Principal Secretary in the Higher Education, Revenue, Food and Civil Supplies, Science and Technology, and Personnel and Administrative Reforms Departments of the Government of Kerala.

From 2008 to 2011, Abraham served as a Whole-Time Member of the Securities and Exchange Board of India (SEBI). During his tenure, he oversaw the Secondary Markets, Investigation and Surveillance, and International Affairs divisions and was associated with regulatory proceedings involving Sahara India Pariwar that were subsequently considered by the Supreme Court of India.

Returning to the Government of Kerala, Abraham served as Additional Chief Secretary in the Higher Education Department from 2011 to 2014. During this period, the Additional Skills Acquisition Programme (ASAP) was introduced with support from the Asian Development Bank. Measures providing for autonomous colleges in Kerala were also introduced, and twenty-three colleges were subsequently granted autonomous status. Other initiatives included Fostering Linkages in Academic Innovation and Research (FLAIR), Walk with a Scholar (WWS), and honours programmes at the undergraduate level in English, Mathematics, Economics and Commerce. He also served, for varying periods, as Vice-Chancellor of the University of Kerala, Mahatma Gandhi University, Cochin University of Science and Technology, and Kannur University.

Abraham concurrently served as Additional Chief Secretary of the Social Justice Department between 2012 and 2014. Programmes initiated during this period included the Nirbhaya Programme for women in distress, a state cochlear implant programme, Kerala's transgender policy, early intervention programmes for persons with disabilities, and the establishment of the National Institute of Physical Medicine and Rehabilitation (NIPMR) in Thrissur.

From 2014 to 2017, he served as Additional Chief Secretary (Finance). During this period, amendments to the Kerala Infrastructure Investment Fund Act facilitated the expansion of the Kerala Infrastructure Investment Fund Board (KIIFB), of which he was appointed Chief Executive Officer.

Abraham served as Chief Secretary to the Government of Kerala until his retirement in December 2017.

== Awards and honors ==
- 16th Archbishop Mar Gregorious Award for Outstanding Service to Social Justice (2018)
- One of the top ten Personality Brand Names selected by Dhanam Magazine (2018)
- Special Award by Campaign for Judicial Accountability and Reforms with National Campaign for People's right to Information for integrity, honesty and professional excellence (2017)
- Satyendra K. Dubey Memorial Award conferred by the Indian Institute of Technology, Kanpur Alumni Association for displaying highest professional integrity and honesty (2016)
- GFiles Governance Award for Exceptional Achievement (2014)
- Selected by India Today among top ten bureaucrats in the State of Kerala (2014)
