= Rakesh Shah =

Indian politician

MLA of Gujarat
- In office 2007–2022
- Constituency: Ellisbridge

Personal details
- Born: Rakesh Shah; 1 January 1962 (age 64)
- Party: Bharatiya Janata Party
- Occupation: Politician
- Website: www.rakeshshah.in

Rakeshbhai Jasvantlal Shah (born 1 January 1962) is an Indian politician from Gujarat. He was a Member of Legislative Assembly from Ellisbridge constituency in the Ahmedabad district, Gujarat for its 12th legislative assembly.

He has been a member of the Bharatiya Janata Party (BJP) since 1998. He was the Party President of Ahmedabad city (Karnavati Mahanagar) for two terms, first time that an M.L.A. held that position for more than one term. He was also the Treasurer of the BJP, Ahmedabad city, from 2006 to 2009. He was the Paldi Ward Councillor for two terms.

== Early life ==
Rakesh Shah was born on 1 January 1962 to a middle-class nima family. He studied in Divan Ballubhai School in Ahmedabad. He attended Navgujarat Commerce College of Gujarat University and took his Bachelors of Commerce degree from there. Rakeshbhai has associated himself with Rashtriya Swayamsevak Sangh (R.S.S.) from his childhood days.

== Career ==
=== Early political career ===
He held the post of the President of R.S.S. Nagar Karya in his early years with the RSS.

=== Political Highlights ===
2000 – 2005	Paldi Ward Councillor, Ahmedabad Municipal Corporation
2005 – 2010	Paldi Ward Councillor, Ahmedabad Municipal Corporation
2006 – 2009	Treasurer, Bharatiya Janata Party, Ahmedabad
2007 - 2022	MLA, Assembly of Gujarat from Ellisbridge Constituency
2010 - 2013	President, Bharatiya Janata Party, Ahmedabad
March 2013 - March 2016	President, Bharatiya Janata Party, Ahmedabad (2nd Term)
Since March, 2016	Executive Committee Member, BJP - Gujarat Pradesh

Rakesh Shah was first elected to Vidhan Sabha from Ellisbridge, Gujarat constituency in 2007. He received a ticket from the Ellisbridge constituency again in 2012. He was incumbent as a Treasurer of the party, Ahmedabad city from the end of 2006 to 2009.

== Recognition ==
As of 2017, he was the Chairman of Special Olympics Bharat of Gujarat. He also holds the Vice President post at Gujarat State Chess Association.

He stood out with a lead of 67,600 in the favour of BJP during the 2007 Vidhan Sabha elections. The number escalated to 76,400 lead during 2012 elections.
