= Raju Narayanaswamy =

Indian Administrative Service officer

Raju Narayana Swamy IAS
- Born: 24 May 1968 (age 58); Changanassery, Kottayam district, Kerala
- Education: IIT Madras (B. Tech.)
- Employer: Government of Kerala
- Organization: Indian Administrative Service
- Known for: Actions as district collector widening five roads of Thrissur city and action against illegal encroachments in Idukki district, leading to the resignation of a minister

Raju Narayana Swamy (born 24 May 1968) is an Indian Administrative Service officer, anticorruption crusader and whistleblower. He is the topper of UPSC Civil Services Examination held in 1991 and is a Sahitya Academy Award winning writer. A district collector for five Kerala districts during his career, Narayanaswamy was one among the three IAS officers chosen by the then chief minister to investigate corruption in the state. He was transferred many times during his career, and has been compared to fellow IAS officer and whistleblower Ashok Khemka. He is an IAS officer of 1991 batch from Kerala Cadre.

== Early life and education ==
Narayanaswamy was born in a Brahmin family at Changanassery in the Kottayam district of Kerala. His parents were college teachers. He studied at Sacred Heart High School, Changanacherry, and secured first rank in the SSLC examination in 1983. He thereafter studied at St. Berchmans College, Changanassery, and secured first rank in the pre-degree exam. Later, he did his B. Tech. in Computer Science at IIT Madras.

Narayanaswamy passed the Civil Services Exam with first rank in 1991 and retained the first rank while passing out of LBSNAA, Mussoorie, in 1993. He has two Ph.D.s: a Ph.D. in political science from Amrita University (2011) and a Ph.D. in law from the Gujarat National Law University, Gandhinagar (2022). He was a bright student and was always a topper in examinations.

== Career ==
A 1991 Kerala-cadre officer Narayanaswamy has held a number of posts and has been repeatedly penalised for exposing corruption. His anti-corruption campaign began early in his career, attracting criticism from political bosses and accolades from the public leading to 31 transfers in 33 years. Narayanaswamy was forced to go on leave as managing director of MarketFed and work for junior officers.

As district collector of Thrissur, he single-handedly widened five roads including the Pattalom Road and the Inner Ring Road changing the face of the town. Narayanaswamy refused permission to a real-estate developer to fill a large paddy farm, because it would have flooded about 50 poor village homes nearby with waste from an adjacent government hospital.

After the V. S. Achuthanandan-led LDF government came into power in Kerala, Narayanaswamy was appointed collector for Idukki district. When Kerala chief minister V. S. Achuthanandan wanted encroachers in Munnar driven out, Narayanaswamy was one of his three handpicked men. Although CPM leaders objected to his choice, Achuthanandan stood his ground.

In 2007, Narayanaswamy inquired into a proposed land deal by the son and daughter of Kerala Public Works minister T. U. Kuruvilla; Kuruvilla was forced to resign after an investigation. Kuruvilla's children had taken ₹65 million from an NRI businessman, promising to sell him land suspected of encroaching. The sale fell through, and the businessman went public; Kuruvilla maintained his innocence. Narayanaswamy, Idukki District Collector, surveyed the land; much was government land, suggesting a violation of the Benami Transactions (Prohibition) Act, 1988, and Kuruvilla resigned.

Narayanaswamy has also proceeded against former minister P. J. Joseph and his family about alleged illegal landholdings. "In my service life, I have always fought against corruption. We could be sidelined but officers should not get demoralized. The public applause we get for taking a strong stand on issues is what keeps us going", he said. Since 2007, he has been transferred a number of times and been tapped by the Election Commission of India for 37 election positions in 17 states across the country. During the 2012 Uttar Pradesh elections, Narayanaswamy was a roll observer for all six districts in Kanpur division. Swamy was removed from his post as civil supplies commissioner in Thiruvananthapuram early the following year after he launched an investigation into corruption charges against civil supplies minister Anoop Jacob.

Appointed chairman of the Coconut Development Board in August 2018, he unearthed corruption involving the CDB's Bangalore regional director and technical officer. Both were investigated and suspended, based on Narayanaswamy's findings. He has been district magistrate and collector of five districts in Kerala. Narayanaswamy, who has been compared to fellow whistleblower Ashok Khemka, has been transferred over 32 times in 34 years and presently works as Principal Secretary to the Government of Kerala.

== Literary career and awards ==
Narayanaswamy has written thirty seven books, including the popular-science book Nano Muthal Nakshatram Vare. He received the 2003 Kerala Sahitya Akademi Award for Travelogue for Santhimantram Muzhangunna Thazvarayil. Narayanaswamy received the Satyendra K. Dubey Memorial Award from IIT Kanpur in 2018 for professional integrity in upholding human values, and was an international observer of the 2018 Zimbabwean general election. He has authored more than 300 research papers and is a recognized guide in several prestigious universities in various disciplines including technology and law (particularly cyber law, intellectual property rights law and maritime law). He is also a recipient of the prestigious Homi Bhabha Fellowship - which brought him into the elite company of stalwarts like Thanu Padmanabhan. In December 2021, he received a Leonardo da Vinci Fellowship from George Mason University to research the prevention of corruption in intellectual property-rights offices with science and technology, including artificial intelligence and blockchain.

== See also ==
- Sateyendra Dubey
- Shanmugam Manjunath
