= Ellis Bridge Assembly constituency =

Legislative Assembly constituency in Gujarat State, India

Coordinates: 23.02°N 72.56°E

Ellisbridge
- Constituency No. 44 for the Gujarat Legislative Assembly

Constituency details
- Country: India
- Region: Western India
- State: Gujarat
- District: Ahmedabad
- Lok Sabha constituency: Ahmedabad West
- Established: 1962
- Total electors: 266,516
- Reservation: None

Member of Legislative Assembly
- 15th Gujarat Legislative Assembly
- Incumbent Amit Shah (mayor)
- Party: Bharatiya Janata Party
- Elected year: 2022

Ellisbridge is one of the 182 Legislative Assembly constituencies of Gujarat state in India. It is part of Ahmedabad district and is a segment of Ahmedabad West Lok Sabha constituency.

== List of segments ==
This assembly seat represents the following segments,

1. Ahmedabad City Taluka (Part) – Ahmedabad
2. Municipal Corporation (Part) Ward No. – 7, 8, 9, 10.

== Members of the Legislative Assembly ==
Year	Member	Party
1962	Indumati Chimanlal Sheth	Indian National Congress
1967	R. K. Patel	Independent
1972	Kokilaben Vyas	Indian National Congress
1975	Babubhai Vasanwala	Indian National Congress (O)
1980	Babubhai Vasanwala	Janata Party
1985	Babubhai Vasanwala	Janata Party
1990	Babubhai Vasanwala	Janata Dal
1995	Haren Pandya	Bharatiya Janata Party
1998	Haren Pandya	Bharatiya Janata Party
2002	Bhavinbhai Sheth	Bharatiya Janata Party
2012	Rakeshbhai Shah	Bharatiya Janata Party
2012	Rakeshbhai Shah	Bharatiya Janata Party
2017	Rakeshbhai Shah	Bharatiya Janata Party
2022	Amit Shah (mayor)	Bharatiya Janata Party

== Election results ==
=== 2022 ===
Gujarat Assembly election, 2022: Ellisbridge
Party	Candidate	Votes	%	±%
BJP	Amit Shah (mayor)	119,323	80.39	+5.54
INC	Bhikhubhai Hargovindbhai Dave	14,527	9.79	−10.46
AAP	Paras Rupeshkumar Shah	9,467	6.38	New
RRP	Surendrabhai Keshavlal Shah	123	0.08	New
NOTA	None of the above	3,056	2.06	−0.17
Majority		1,04,796	70.6	+16
Turnout				
Registered electors		265,533		
BJP hold		Swing	+5.54	

=== 2017 ===
Gujarat Legislative Assembly Election, 2017: Ellisbridge
Party	Candidate	Votes	%	±%
BJP	Rakesh Shah	116,811	74.85	+4.34
INC	Vijaykumar Ratilal Dave	31,606	20.25	+0.44
BSP	Malabhai Hirabhai Solanki	2,144	1.37	
IND.	Nilaben Jivrajbhai Solanki	553	0.35	
SUCI(C)	Meenakshi Pravinchandra Joshi	476	0.31	
NOTA	None of the Above	3,479	2.23	
Majority		85,205	54.60	
Turnout		1,56,065	63.92	
BJP hold		Swing	+1.95	

=== 2012 ===
2012 Gujarat Legislative Assembly election: Ellisbridge
Party	Candidate	Votes	%	±%
BJP	Rakesh Shah	1,06,631	70.57	−1.65
INC	Kamleshkumar Shah	29,959	19.83	−4.46
GPP	Jagruti Haren Pandya	9,075	6.01	New
LJP	Malabhai Hirabhai Solanki	3,126	2.07	New
Majority		76,672	50.74	+0.04
Turnout		1,51,093	67.64	
BJP hold		Swing		

=== 2007 ===
Gujarat Legislative Assembly Election, 2007: Ellisbridge
Party	Candidate	Votes	%	±%
BJP	Rakesh Shah	93,780	72.22	−3.86
INC	Kalpesh Keshavlal Patel (Bholo)	31,537	24.29	+4.42
BSP	Ketanbhai Indravadanbhai Joshi	1,789	1.38	New
Majority		62,243	47.93	
Turnout		1,29,853		
BJP hold		Swing		

=== 2002 ===
2002 Gujarat Legislative Assembly election: Ellisbridge
Party	Candidate	Votes	%	±%
BJP	Bhavinbhai Nalinbhai Sheth	78,224	76.08	
INC	Pradipkumar Kantilal Ruwala	20,434	19.87	
NCP	Dinesh Vakta	1,483	1.44	
SS	Amitkumar Parikh	849	0.83	
Majority		57,790	56.19	
Turnout		1,02,846	48.46	
BJP hold		Swing		

=== 1998 ===
Gujarat Legislative Assembly Election, 1998: Ellis Bridge
Party	Candidate	Votes	%	±%
BJP	Haren Pandya	84,101	77.43	+5.99
INC	Raval Harinbhai Pravinkant	19,581	18.03	−5.09
AIRJP	Dhiren Bhatt	3,617	3.33	
Independent	Damini Vismaybhai Shah	893	0.82	−1.15
Majority		64,520	58.18	+10.81
Turnout		1,10,888	48.82	−1.92
BJP hold				

=== 1995 ===
Gujarat Legislative Assembly Election, 1995: Ellis Bridge
Party	Candidate	Votes	%	±%
BJP	Haren Pandya	77,916	71.44	+65.99
INC	Dashrathbhai Govindbhai Patel (Vasanavala)	25,216	23.12	+10.17
Independent	Damini Vismay Shah	2,146	1.97	
Rashtriya Surajya Parishad	Pandya Jayantbhai Maganlal	816	0.75	
Majority		52,700	47.37	−46.72
Turnout		1,11,262	50.74	+3.57
BJP gain from JD				

== See also ==
- List of constituencies of the Gujarat Legislative Assembly
- Ahmedabad district
