= Satyendra K. Dubey Memorial Award =

The Satyendra K. Dubey Memorial Award is an award named after Satyendra Dubey and presented by the IIT-Kanpur. It is awarded annually to an IIT alumnus who displays the highest levels of professional integrity in upholding human values. The Memorial Award was instituted by IIT Kanpur in 2005 in memory of Satyendra K. Dubey (BT/CE/1994/IITK) and his exemplary life and supreme sacrifice.

== Eligibility ==
Any alumnus of any IIT who has distinguished him or herself by displaying the highest professional integrity in upholding human values is eligible for the Satyendra K. Dubey Memorial Award.

== Awardees ==
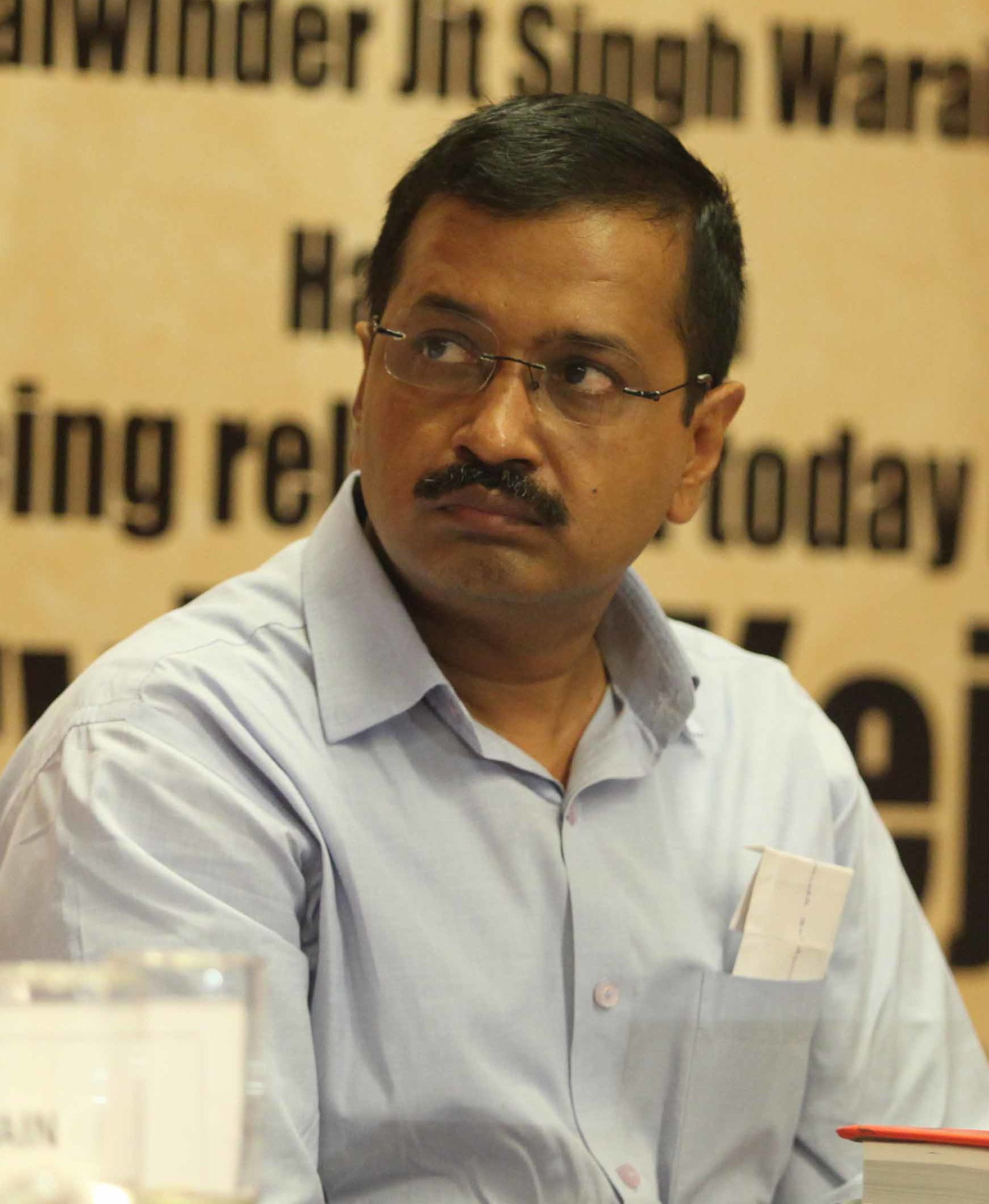
Arvind Kejriwal, the first awardee of the Satyendra K. Dubey Memorial Award.

Year	Awardee
2020	Kumar Ravi
2019	Vikas Vaibhav
2018	Raju Narayana Swamy
2017	Vikas Kumar
2016	K. M. Abraham
2015	Kuldip Narayan
2013	Trilochan Sastry
2012	Rahul Sharma
2011	Sanjeeb Kumar Patjoshi
2010	Shailesh Ramkumar Gandhi
2009	Vijay Saluja
2009	Lalit Kishore Chaudhary
2008	Anubrotto Kumar Roy
2006	Ganesh P. Bagaria
2005	Arvind Kejriwal
