= Faheem Ansari =

Indian Muslim

Faheem Ansari, also known as Mohammad Faheem Ansari, is an Indian Muslim who was charged with involvement in the 2008 Mumbai attacks and was acquitted due to lack of evidence. Ansari, however was convicted for fake Pakistani passport forging and aiding in the attack of a Central Reserve Police Force camp in Uttar Pradesh. He was also charged with being a member of the Lashkar-e-Taiba (LeT), an Islamic terrorist organization. He was arrested in February 2009 along with five others, charged with these crimes and prosecuted, but was acquitted after being given benefit of doubt. The late Shahid Azmi was his lawyer and fought his case pro bono. Faheem Ansari was discharged by court in May 2010, a few months after Shahid Azmi's death by gunmen in February 2010. He was released after 12 years of detention because of a case, in which he was acquitted because of lack of evidence.

== Background ==
Ansari's family was originally from Uttar Pradesh, but he was born and raised in Mumbai. He is married to Yasmin, with whom he has a daughter, Iqra. In 2007, he returned to Mumbai and stayed there for about three months. Though his parents and brothers were residing in the Goregaon suburb of the city, he made no attempt to contact them during his entire stay. He first stayed at a guest house in Grant Road, but after a few weeks rented a small accommodation. Ansari had initially planned on renting an accommodation in Colaba, but due to the high rent there, decided to settle at Grant Road.

The Mumbai police alleged that Ansari did a reconnaissance of several prominent Mumbai landmarks, including the Mumbai Stock Exchange, the Mumbai police headquarters at Crawford Market, the Maharashtra police headquarters at Colaba, the Mahalakshmi Temple and the Siddhivinayak temple. Ansari went to the Taj Hotel and Oberoi Trident as a tourist and shot video footage of the interiors.

== Arrest ==
On 10 February 2008, Uttar Pradesh police arrested Ansari along with five others. These included Pakistani nationals Romez alias "Amar Singh" and Sehwez alias "Ajay Malhotra" and Indian nationals Sohel, Sawauddin (or Sabauddin) Sanju and Baba Jung Bahadur. He was arrested for his involvement with an attack on a Central Reserve Police Force camp in Rampur on 31 December 2007, in which 7 paramilitary personnel and 1 civilian were killed. The interrogation revealed that Ansari had performed reconnaissance over twelve places in Mumbai, including government, police, transportation, tourist and financial sites over the course of two months. However, Ansari later alleged that the Mumbai police conveniently made him a scapegoat and deliberately falsified evidence against him.

== Alleged role in the Mumbai attacks and acquittal ==
On 31 December 2008, Ansari, along with Sabahuddin Shaikh, was formally accused of aiding the November 2008 attackers in Bombay. The interrogation of Ajmal Qasab and of Ansari, revealed that none of the attackers had been in the city before the attacks, and acted solely on intelligence provided by Ansari. On 11 February 2010, his lawyer Shahid Azmi was murdered in what was suspected by authorities to be a professional contract killing. On 3 May 2010, Ansari and the co-accused Sabahuddin Shaikh were acquitted of any complicity in the attacks. In the acquittal, the Judge blasted the Bombay police for the case it made against him and Sabahuddin Shaikh. They were shifted from Arthur Road Jail to Uttar Pradesh to stand trial in connection with the CRPF camp attack at Rampur in 2007.

== Sexual harassment ==
Advocate Ejaz Naqvi, the lawyer for Ansari, presented in court an allegation that a female FBI agent had removed all of Ansari's clothes and showed him pornographic films. Naqvi also requested that Ansari be taken for a medical examination. The court asked the Crime Branch to investigate and report by 26 February 2009, and ordered the medical examination. Ansari had earlier questioned the right of FBI agents to interrogate him.

== See also ==
- Shahid, 2012 film about Shahid Azmi
