= Ellis Bridge (neighbourhood) =

Ellis bridge
- Neighbourhood
- Location in Ahmedabad, Gujarat, India Ellis bridge (Gujarat)
- Coordinates: 23.023421°N 72.564857°E
- Country: India
- State: Gujarat
- District: Ahmedabad

Government
  - Body: Ahmedabad Municipal Corporation

Languages
  - Official: Gujarati, Hindi
- Time zone: UTC+5:30 (IST)
- PIN: 380006
- Telephone code: 91 79
- Vehicle registration: GJ
- Lok Sabha constituency: Ahmedabad West
- Vidhan Sabha constituency: Ellis bridge
- Civic agency: Ahmedabad Municipal Corporation
- Website: gujaratindia.com

Ellis Bridge is an area located in Ahmedabad, India.

== location ==
The Ellis Bridge neighborhood is located in the central part of the city of Ahmedabad in the state of Gujarat, western India. The area lies on the eastern bank of the Sabarmati River, near the bridge of the same name, which connects the eastern and western parts of the city.
