= Trads (Hindutva) =

Loose group of alt-right activists and internet trolls

Trads (short for "Traditionalists") is a term used to describe various internet groups relating to the alt-right within the Hindutva movement. Advocating for a Hindu nation based on traditional values and Brahminical supremacy, they also want a strict adherence to the traditional Hindu caste system. The group is seen as a Hindu supremacist faction that criticises other Hindutva groups like the Rashtriya Swayamsevak Sangh (RSS), the Vishva Hindu Parishad (VHP), and the Bharatiya Janata Party (BJP), for weakening "true" Hindu traditions. Their content is based on provocative hate based on caste, religion, race, and gender and these groups promote rhetoric for genocide of Muslims and other Indian minorities.

== Background ==
A sub-cultural movement, it hosts the people who are inspired by the idea of a Hindu nation. The term "trad" is short for "traditional". The debate between trads and other Hindutva supporters exist due to the differences between their ideologies. The trads consider themselves as the defenders of Hinduism and find Narendra Modi to be soft on the Muslims and Dalits.

== Trads and Raitas ==
Trads refer to other Hindu nationalist factions as "raitas" for having softer stances toward caste hierarchy and non-Hindu religions. Raitas generally support Narendra Modi and RSS, while Trads often criticise RSS and use the term "Maulana Modi" for Narendra Modi in a derogatory manner.

Comparison of Trads and Raitas
Aspect	Trads	Raitas
Ideological position	Hardline, extremist Hindutva	Mainstream, pro-Hindutva
View on Narendra Modi	Critical, call him "Maulana Modi" for being too moderate	Supportive, view him as a strong leader
Approach to Hindutva	Advocate for a purist, traditionalist Hindu state	Support a more pragmatic, electoral Hindutva
Views on Muslims and minorities	Openly extremist, support violence against them	Prefer institutional suppression over direct action
Involvement in controversies	Linked to Bulli Bai and Sulli Deals hate campaigns	Often defend BJP from left-wing criticism
View on RSS and BJP	Criticise RSS and BJP for being too soft	Strongly support BJP and RSS
View on the Constitution	Want Manusmriti as the constitution	Prefer the Indian Constitution with desirable changes

== Online activism ==
Trads are primarily active in online spaces, using social media to conduct campaigns and disseminate extremist content. They frequently use memes and do not have a formal organizational structure. Doge memes, Wojak face memes, and Pepe the Frog memes are often used by trads. The green frog with a skullcap is used to mock Muslims, while the blue frog is used as an insult against Ambedkarite Dalits, referring them as "Bhimtas."

== Sulli Deals and Bulli Bai app ==
Sulli Deals was an open-source app created by Trads used to target Muslim women by sharing their photographs and personal details online. The app was hosted on GitHub and sparked outrage, leading to legal action and police investigations. The Delhi Police registered an FIR after the National Commission for Women took suo moto cognizance of the case. The app's creator, Aumkareshwar Thakur, a self-identified trad member and BCA student from Indore, was arrested in January 2022 but later granted bail.

Following the incident, a similar app called Bulli Bai emerged in early 2022, targeting Muslim women in a similar manner. The police arrested trad member Neeraj Bishnoi, as a key suspect in the case.

== Reception ==
The rigid stance and aggressive tactics of the trads have drawn widespread criticism. Human rights organizations and political opponents argue that their ideology deepens social divisions and weakens democratic pluralism.

The conflict between trads and raitas is viewed by some political analysts as a reflection of deeper fractures within the Hindutva movement.
