= Bulli Bai case =

2022 Indian online mock auction of Muslim women

The Bulli Bai case
- Location: India
- Date: 1 January 2022
- Attack type: Hate speech
- No. of participants: 4 ( Neeraj Bishnoi, main accused from Assam)
- Motive: Harassment and humiliation of Muslim women

The Bulli Bai case (Note: "Bulli" is a euphemism or slang for Muslim females derived from the word mullah, while bai is an Indian honorific, used here ironically.) related to an online mock auction of Muslim women in India. Photos of prominent Muslim journalists and activists were uploaded on the Bulli Bai app without their permission where they were auctioned virtually. Like Sulli Deals, the app did not actually sell anyone, but harassed and humiliated these women. The app has been removed from the Internet platform GitHub, where it was hosted, following outrage over the app.

The police investigating the case, have found that the creators of the app identify as "Trads" (stands for "traditionalists”), who promote genocide against minorities.

== Background ==
On 4 July 2021, several Muslim women pictures were posted on Twitter as "deal of the day", after which several accounts started speaking against the Sulli Deals app which was hosted on GitHub as an "open-source project." After multiple complaints, GitHub took the app down and suspended the "Sulli Deals" account which hosted the app. Delhi Police investigated the matter and did not make any arrests in the Sulli Deals case until end of 2021. In January 2022, the Delhi police claimed to have arrested the creator of Sulli Deals from Indore, Madhya Pradesh.

== Incident ==
Reportedly on 1 January 2022, a GitHub Pages site was launched in the subdomain "bullibai.github.io" that contained allegedly doctored pictures of numerous Indian women that includes journalists, social workers, students and famous personalities, accompanied by derogatory content. These pictures were reportedly taken from their respective Social Media accounts before being edited and uploaded to the website for an auction without their consent. All of these women were Muslims. The GitHub page and the user account that launched it has since been removed by GitHub following complaints about objectionable content.

== Accused ==
According to the police investigating the case, all the four accused were reported. The police have linked the creators of the app to alt-right groups inspired by Neo-Nazism. The members of these groups call themselves "Trads", short for traditionalists. These groups promote rhetoric for genocide of Muslims and other Indian minorities. The creators of the app had used Sikh religion names to mislead people. According to Mumbai Police, this could have caused religious enmity and violence. On 9 March 2022, the Delhi Police filed a charge sheet, charging the accused persons with offenses including Section 153A (Promoting enmity between groups), Section 153B (causing disharmony), 354A(3) (Sexual harassment), and 509 (insulting the modesty of a woman) of the Indian Penal Code.

On 29 March, the court granted bail to two men accused of creating the apps, on humanitarian grounds adding that the accused was the "first-time offender".

== Reactions ==
The journalist body, Editors Guild of India released a statement taking note of the incident and stated, "Though law enforcement agencies have arrested those supposedly behind such apps, there is a need for further investigation to ensure that all those behind such despicable acts, even beyond those arrested, are brought to justice."

On 11 January 2022, the United Nations Special Rapporteur on Minority Issues, Fernand de Varennes, said, "Minority Muslim women in India are harassed and ‘sold’ in social media apps, #SulliDeals, a form of hate speech, must be condemned and prosecuted as soon as they occur. All Human Rights of minorities need to be fully and equally protected".
