= Haren Pandya =

Gujarat politician (1961–2003)

Home Minister Government of Gujarat
- In office 4 March 1998 – 6 October 2001
- Chief Minister: Keshubhai Patel

Minister of State for revenue Government of Gujarat
- In office 7 October 2001 – 13 August 2002
- Chief Minister: Narendra Modi

Member of Gujarat Legislative Assembly
- In office 1995 — 2002
- Preceded by: Babubhai Vasanwala
- Succeeded by: Bhavinbhai Sheth
- Constituency: Ellis Bridge

Personal details
- Born: 27 August 1961 Gujarat, India
- Died: 26 March 2003 (aged 41) Ahmedabad, Gujarat, India
- Party: BJP
- Spouse: Jagruti Pandya
- Relations: Sunita Williams (Cousin)

Haren Pandya (27 August 1961 – 26 March 2003) was an Indian politician and a former Home Minister of Gujarat. He was murdered in 2003 in Ahmedabad, Gujarat, when he was sitting in his car (the place of his murder is contentious), after a morning walk in the Law Garden area in Ahmedabad.

== Political career ==
Haren Pandya represented the Ellis Bridge Assembly constituency of Ahmedabad as a Bharatiya Janata Party (BJP) legislator. He was a member of the RSS from his early age and was also a Municipal Councillor from the Paldi area of Ahmedabad. Pandya was a strong supporter of Chief Minister of Gujarat Keshubhai Patel, and in 1998, after the BJP came to power in Gujarat with Keshubhai as Chief Minister, Pandya was made Home Minister. He was appointed Minister of State for revenue after Narendra Modi took over as the Chief Minister; however, he resigned from the post in August 2002. Fearing that he would be denied a ticket for the 2002 Gujarat Legislative Assembly election, he withdrew from the electoral fray. Later, he was appointed to BJP's national executive.

Pandya's wife Jagruti Pandya contested on a Gujarat Parivartan Party ticket in 2012 on the premise that the Modi Government was involved in the conspiracy to murder her husband. She was quoted, "My husband's assassination was a political murder. For the last 10 years, I have been fighting a legal battle to get him justice but in vain, however, I will continue to fight". "I have never made any personal allegations, never named anybody. So I have no personal issues with Narendra Modi or Amit Shah. I just questioned the manner in which the probe was conducted," she said.

=== 2002 Gujarat violence ===
After the 2002 Gujarat violence, it was reported that in a cabinet meeting, Pandya had opposed the bringing of bodies of the victims to Ahmedabad because that would arouse passion. It has been claimed that he was the only person able to arrange meetings between victims' family members and Muslim leaders for peace talks, but he was shouted down at the meeting by some ministers.

Supreme Court of India acknowledged the allegations that Pandya played an active role in post-Godhra riots and also stated that there was an allegation that he was involved in leading a mob which demolished a mosque in Paldi and he resisted its reconstruction. The Supreme Court held that allegations of this involvement led to his murder as revenge.

In November 2007, Outlook reported that Pandya had revealed to the magazine in May 2002 that on the night of 27 February 2002 Narendra Modi had held a meeting in his residence, in which he instructed the attending bureaucrats and police officers to allow "people to vent their frustration and not come in the way of the Hindu backlash." Pandya had disclosed this information on condition of confidentiality. On 19 August 2002, Pandya again spoke to the magazine, according to Outlook, and reiterated what he had said earlier, with the additional comment that if his identity as the source of this information were to be revealed, he would be killed. The second conversation with Pandya was recorded by the magazine.

It has also been revealed that Pandya had testified before The Concerned Citizens Tribunal on 2002 Gujarat riots. Referring to Pandya's testimony, the tribunal's report says:

The tribunal received direct information through a testimony from a highly placed source of a meeting (on February 27, 2002) where the CM [Modi], two or three senior cabinet colleagues, the Ahmedabad police commissioner and an IG police were present. The meeting had a singular purpose: the senior-most police officials were told that they should expect a "Hindu reaction" after Godhra. They were also told they should not do anything to contain this reaction.

Hosbet Suresh, who was a member of the tribunal, testified before the tribunal and a recording of Pandya's testimony before the tribunal exists.

The Supreme Court-appointed Special Investigation Team (SIT), after investigation, concluded that Haren Pandya was not present in any such meeting and that such a claim is a "figment of imagination". The call records of Haren Pandya showed that he was in Ahmedabad at the time of the alleged meeting while meeting was at CM's residence in Gandhinagar. This fact was used to conclude that Pandya could not have been present at the meeting. All the participants of the meeting said that no MoS or Cabinet Minister was present at the meeting (Haren Pandya was MoS Revenue at that time). SIT accused Haren Pandya of misleading statements. SIT also said that the testimony of Haren Pandya and Sanjiv Bhatt were only to sensationalise and politicise the matters.

== Assassination and aftermath ==
On 26 March 2003, at about 7:40 am, Pandya was killed by two unidentified assailants who shot five bullets at him when he had just finished his morning walk in the Law Gardens in Ahmedabad. His body lay in his car for two hours. Pandya's family started worrying when he did not return home and sent his personal assistant Nilesh Bhatt to check on him. Bhatt found him lying dead in his car.

A lot of controversy followed his murder and top BJP Leaders such as Chief Minister Narendra Modi, Amit Shah and the then Deputy Prime Minister of India L. K. Advani were under intense criticism from within the Sangh Pariwar and general public for sidelining Haren Pandya, and not providing him proper security despite threats to his life, and his request for security cover. IPS officer Sanjiv Bhatt had even alerted Pandya about a threat to his life, and even spoke out about Pandya to the Special Investigation Team probing the Godhra riots.

In 2007, a special POTA court had sentenced the main accused, Asgar Ali from Hyderabad, to life imprisonment, while handing out life imprisonment to seven others, 10-year jail term to two and five years imprisonment to one. They were all held guilty of murder and conspiracy to spread terror in the case of Pandya's murder and attempted murder charges in the case of VHP leader Jagdish Tiwari.

On 29 August 2011, all the 12 people accused of murdering Pandya were acquitted of the murder charges by the Gujarat High Court, but other charges including criminal conspiracy and attempt to murder were retained. The high court called the CBI's work a "botched up and blinkered" investigation.

Supreme Court of India held that the murder of Haren Pandya and attempt to murder of VHP leader Jagdish Tiwari were part of common conspiracy to spread terror amongst Hindus. The Supreme Court held that the murder was committed to avenge the post Godhra riots, in which Haren Pandya was considered by murderers to have played a role.

In July 2019, the Supreme Court in its final verdict reversed the decision of the Gujarat High Court and convicted 12 persons of the killing of Haren Pandya.

An NGO named Centre for Public Interest Litigation (CPIL), on the basis of statements of a witness in Sohrabuddin Sheikh case and allegations made on the then Gujarat government in a book named Gujarat Files by journalist Rana Ayyub had sought re-investigation in Haren Pandya murder case. The court rejected the NGO's plea for further probe in the case, and as contempt of court, slammed Rs. 50,000 fine to the NGO. The bench said Gujarat Files can not be projected as conclusive evidence as it is based upon one's individual surmises, conjectures, and suppositions.

== Theories about perpetrators ==
In August 2011, DNA magazine reported that Sohrabuddin Sheikh, a criminal who had earlier been killed by the Gujarat police in an encounter, and his associate Killing of Tulsiram Prajapati may have been "used to kill Haren Pandya". Citing unnamed sources in the Gujarat Police, the report said that Sohrabuddin was initially given the task, but he back-pedalled and the murder was then executed by Tulsiram. In the encounter killings of Sohrabuddin and Tulsiram, the Gujarat state attorney K.T.S Tulsi admitted before the court that these individuals were killed by the state police.

According to Sanjiv Bhatt, Pandya's murder was carried out by Tulsiram Prajapati as per what Bhatt was informed by Asgar Ali, a criminal from Hyderabad. Asgar had informed Bhatt that he was contacted by Sohrabuddin Sheikh to carry out the murder, and had even visited Ahmedabad for this purpose, but at the last moment he had changed his mind and returned to Hyderabad without killing Pandya. Later Asgar came to know that the crime had been perpetrated by Tulsiram Prajapati, according to Bhatt.

D. G. Vanzara, the Gujarat police officer who had originally investigated the Pandya murder, and who has faced arrest and incarceration on charges of coordinating the Sohrabuddin and Tulsiram encounters, testified before the CBI in September 2013 about Sohrabuddin's role in Pandya's murder, and indicated a political conspiracy behind the killing.

=== Cut out murder ===
In police terminology, the Pandya case has been called a "cut-out murder" in which it is not possible to establish the link between the victim and the conspirator or motivator of the crime. A police official offered this explanation:

A wants to murder Z and instructs B to execute the order. B tells C who does not know that A is the instigator. Instructions are passed in this manner from C to D and then to E and it goes down all the way. The final contract killer does not know where the order originated from. If investigations turns nasty, then all A has to do is to make any of the people in the chain a cut-out—take him out by beginning another chain.

== See also ==
- Kuldeep Sharma (Cop)
- R. B. Sreekumar
- Sanjiv Bhatt

== See also ==
- List of assassinated Indian politicians
