= Gujarat Files =

2016 journalistic book by Rana Ayyub

Gujarat Files: Anatomy of a Cover Up
- Author: Rana Ayyub
- Language: English
- Subject: 2002 Gujarat riots
- Genre: Investigative journalism
- Published: 2016
- Publication place: India

Gujarat Files: Anatomy of a Cover Up is a journalistic book about the 2002 Gujarat riots authored and self-published by Rana Ayyub. The book is dedicated to Shahid Azmi along with advocate and activist Mukul Sinha. The foreword of the book is authored by Justice B. N. Srikrishna.

== Background ==
By posing as Maithili Tyagi, a US based film-maker and a student of the American Film Institute subscribing to the Rashtriya Swayamsevak Sangh's ideology, Ayyub managed to get access to senior police officers, bureaucrats, and politicians in Gujarat. She even managed to meet Narendra Modi in her Maithili Tyagi disguise. Ayyub was wearing a concealed camera and microphone during these meetings which enabled her to record her conversations. The book is based on these recorded conversations. The recordings were made in the years 2010–11 in a time frame spanning eight months. The entire exercise had been carried out on behalf of Tehelka for whom Ayyub was working at the time. Tehelka put an end to the investigation in April 2011.

== Publication ==
According to a September 2016 column by Priya Ramani in Mint, Gujarat Files has become a bestseller with Ayyub managing to sell 32,000 copies of her book. Ramani notes that although no publisher was willing to publish her work, India's biggest English language book distributor, India Book Distributors (IBD), has reached an agreement with Ayyub to distribute the book the previous month and they have already sold 8,000 copies of the book. A Hindi-language edition was published in 2017. By 2019n, Ayyub said the book had sold more than 600,000 copies.

=== Bookshops ===
It is alleged that many bookshops have refused to stock the book. In a July 2016 interview in Frontline, Ayyub claimed that she called bookshops in Mumbai and Ahmedabad pretending to be a reader looking to buy Gujarat Files.

The book stores in Ahmedabad categorically said it was not the type of book they wanted to keep. Mumbai bookstores said there was a huge demand from readers because it was an Amazon bestseller but that it was too dangerous a book to be stocked in their bookshops. One of them suggested that I order a copy from Amazon since it involved no risk.

== Reception ==
=== Reviews ===
In a review of the book in The Hindu, Suchitra Vijayan writes that the book attempts to show how the bureaucracy, and the police, working in tandem, created lawlessness in Gujarat "in the aftermath of the anti-Muslim pogrom in 2002, and the numerous encounter deaths that took place between 2002 and 2006." Vijayan quotes Justice Brandeis of the US Supreme Court: "If the Government becomes a lawbreaker, it breeds contempt for law; it invites every man to become a law unto himself; it invites anarchy.” According to Vijayan, the book contains incriminating information against Amit Shah and Narendra Modi; and the information that dalit and lower caste police officers in Gujarat were co-opted and made instruments of state violence. However, Vijayan calls the book an unfinished work "waiting for context and analysis." In a review of the book in the Hindustan Times, Manjula Narayan writes that the book "[implicates] powerful politicians and [reveals] sins of omission and commission." According to Narayan, the book is "an important work" which confirms many fears of corruption surrounding the Gujarat riots.

In a review of the book in the Business Standard, Nilanjan Mukhopadhyay notes that the book's importance is due to the details it provides regarding the events in Gujarat in, and after, the year 2002. According to Mukhopadhyay:

[T]he book is an important document — not as much for being a complete and rounded analysis or story but for providing important nuggets of information that enable further detailing of the Modi persona and the nature of the regime he ran in Gujarat. The book provides significant insights through disclosures made by retired and serving police officials in which they present their perspective on events in Gujarat during the 2002 riots and subsequent contentious developments: the repeated police encounters.

In a review of the book in Mint, Salil Tripathi notes that "The picture that emerges from Gujarat Files is profoundly disillusioning because it reveals that the checks and balances which are so vital for a functioning democracy simply did not work in Gujarat." The officers Ayyub interviewed express helplessness in carrying out illegal orders because not doing so would jeopardize their careers, according to Tripathi. While commending Ayyub for her courage in the journalistic work she did to collect the material for this book, Tripathi observes:

The most disturbing part about Ayyub’s account is the casual acceptance of encounters. Senior police officers are aware of the questionable legality of encounters, but they seem to accept these as part of their job; their regret is over details (such as there was no need to kill Kausar Bi), and not over the practice itself. Human rights groups have long criticized extra-judicial executions in India, and “encounter” is a euphemism for illegal murders carried out by the state.

=== Impact ===
Ramachandra Guha has called Gujarat Files "a brave book". Reflecting on the procedure used by Ayyub in composing Gujarat Files, Nilanjan Mukhopadhyay has observed: "Going undercover and interviewing many who had been in the thick of gruesome extra-constitutional operations required bravado and this must be appreciated." Priya Ramani has noted that though the book has been criticized for being poorly edited and lacking context, its actual content has not been criticized by anyone. Manoj Mitta has noted the silence on the book of those who were secretly taped by Ayyub, and also of a large section of mainstream media. While noting the silence on the book in a section of the Indian media, including the complete silence on Indian television, Jyoti Malhotra has commented that many journalists have privately applauded Ayyub's courage in authoring this book. According to Malhotra, the charges in the book are serious in that Narendra Modi himself is accused of being complicit in the 2002 Gujarat riots. The book also accuses Amit Shah "of allegedly masterminding the Gujarat riots as well as ordering the killing of a terrorist Sohrabuddin Sheikh, his wife or live-in partner Kausar Bi and his associate Tulsiram Prajapati, "according to Malhotra. "If these transcripts are validated, they could present serious legal and ethical repercussions about Shah’s use of the State police force as his personal assassination squad and the bureaucracy as his fief," writes Suchitra Vijayan. Indira Jaising, who represented the CBI in court in the Ishrat case, has observed that "[t]he book validates what CBI investigations had revealed.” Reflecting on the book, Manjula Narayan observes:

Gujarat 2002 is still with us. The shame and horror continues to haunt us, which explains the packed book launch venues and the eagerness of several liberal public figures to be seen at them. Registering your presence is a public announcement of your cosmopolitanism and enlightened politics, disseminated in quick time over social media networks. Ayyub’s repeated suggestion that mainstream media has blacked out her book – most print publications, at least, seem to have reviewed it within a fortnight of the launch, an honour normally reserved for the likes of Amartya Sen – has contributed to the conspiracy theories besides bolstering the author’s reputation as a fearless journalist.

In 2023, the author was interviewed regarding India–United States relations on Democracy Now!

=== Criticism ===
In the Haren Pandya murder case, the Supreme Court of India dismissed Rana Ayyub's book, stating that "it is based upon surmises, conjectures, and suppositions and has no evidentiary value." Ayyub termed the court's comments "puzzling", since the CBI had used her work as evidence in other related cases, and noted that no officer or bureaucrat had denied her claims or taken her to court.

In response to claims by Rana Ayyub at the book's launch & suggestions in the book that her work was not carried by Tehelka (the weekly the author was a journalist with) citing “political pressure”, Shoma Chaudhury, then managing editor of Tehelka, has written: "It did not meet the necessary editorial standards. While parts of the story were good, there were a lot of loopholes and serious concerns about the procedure that had been followed. Rana is a courageous reporter and out of a respect for her work I would not like to detail those concerns publicly. However, they were discussed with Rana in great detail many times, both via emails and verbal discussions.

=== Ethics ===
The ethics of doing journalism using secret recordings has been called into question. Ayyub has addressed this issue by noting that there was no other way to place the facts on record.
