= Kuldeep Sharma (police officer) =

Retired Indian police officer

Kuldip Sharma is a retired Indian bureaucrat who previously served as the Director General of the Bureau of Police Research and Development, Ministry of Home Affairs, New Delhi. He was awarded Indian Police Medal by the President for meritorious service on Republic Day 1994, Police (Special Duties) Medal for service in J & K, and President's Police Medal for distinguished service on Independence Day 2001.

== Family ==
He is a brother of Pradeep Nirankarnath Sharma.

== Biography ==
A member of the 1976 IPS batch, he was serving as an Additional Director General in the CID department when he accused BJP politician and then home minister of Gujarat Amit Shah of taking a ₹2.5 crore bribe for releasing Ketan Parekh, who was involved in a ₹1600 crore scam by Madhavpura Mercantile Co-operative Bank Limited. He was transferred to another department after he began investigating the bribery allegations against Amit Shah.

In a trafficking case involving Mallika Sarabhai, who had previously filed a petition in the Supreme Court against BJP CM of Gujarat Narendra Modi for his involvement in the Gujarat violence, Sharma argued that he was pressurized and threatened by Amit Shah when he ordered the closure of the case. Sharma also stated that he faced threats from Amit Shah when he ordered a case against BJP politician Kamlesh Tiwari for extortion.

In 2010, Gujarat Police submitted a report suspecting Amit Shah of involvement in the encounter killing of Sohrabuddin Sheikh, which led to his arrest and subsequent chargesheeting in the case. The report was submitted on the orders of Sharma.

In 2011, he was named as an accused in a fake encounter killing by the Modi government as part of a political vendetta, this case later was quashed by Administrative Tribunal (CAT) and Sharma was cleared of all charges. In 2012, acting on an official sanction issued by Narendra Modi, the court began the prosecution of Sharma in a minor wrongful confinement case dating to 1984. Sharma filed repeated appeals challenging the sanction.

In 2015, Sharma's counsel Kapil Sibal claimed that the Gujarat government tried "every trick in the book to send the officer behind bars. It is very well known why such action was taken against him and the state government was hell-bent to wreck vengeance on Sharma."

In early 2025, he was convicted in the case and an arrest warrant was issued against him later that year. This was criticized as a politically motivated act against Sharma. Congress spokesperson for Gujarat Hiren Banker stated "There are two types of law system operating in Gujarat. The one who speaks in favour of BJP government gets all the perks including promotions etc. The other is the one who questions the government and gets punishment by the state. The process is the punishment for them,".

== See also ==
- R. B. Sreekumar
- Sanjiv Bhatt
- Haren Pandya
- Nambi Narayanan
