= Nanavati-Mehta Commission =

2002 commission of inquiry appointed by the Government of Gujarat

The Nanavati-Mehta Commission was a commission of inquiry appointed by the government of Gujarat to probe the Godhra train burning incident of 27 February 2002. Its mandate was later enlarged to include the investigation of the 2002 Gujarat riots. It was appointed on 6 March 2002, with K. G. Shah, a retired Gujarat High Court judge, as its only member. It was later re-constituted to include G. T. Nanavati, a retired judge of the Supreme Court of India, after protests from human rights organizations over Shah's closeness to then-Gujarat Chief Minister Narendra Modi. Akshay H. Mehta, retired judge of the Gujarat High Court, replaced Shah when the latter died before the submission of the commission's interim report. Mehta was the same judge who had granted bail to Babu Bajrangi, the main accused of the Naroda Patiya massacre.

In September 2008 the Commission submitted the part of its report covering the Godhra train burning incident (Part I) in which it had concluded that burning of the S-6 coach of Sabarmati Express near Godhra railway station was a "planned conspiracy". The part dealing with subsequent violence was submitted on 18 November 2014. Its term ended on 31 October 2014, having received 24 extensions from the state government.

== Background ==
On the morning of 27 February 2002, the Sabarmati Express, returning from Ayodhya to Ahmedabad, was stopped near the Godhra railway station. Several of the passengers were Hindu kar sevaks, or volunteers, returning from a religious ceremony at the disputed Ramjanmabhoomi-Babri mosque site. Under circumstances that are the subject of debate, four coaches of the train caught on fire, trapping many people inside. The resulting blaze killed 59 people, including 25 women and 25 children. The event was generally perceived as the trigger for the anti-Muslim riots that followed, in which some estimate upwards of 2000 people were killed, while 150,000 were displaced. Rape, mutilation, and torture were also widespread.

== Appointment and membership ==
On 6 March 2002, the government of Gujarat appointed a commission of inquiry under section 3 of the Commissions of Inquiry Act, 1952 to investigate into the Godhra train burning incident, the subsequent riots and the adequacy or lack thereof of the administrative measures taken to prevent and deal with the disturbances that followed, both in Godhra and subsequently across the state. The commission was a single member commission consisting of Justice K. G. Shah, a retired Gujarat High Court judge. However, Shah's alleged closeness to Narendra Modi provoked outrage from the families of the victims as well as from Human Rights organisations, and resulted in call for a more independent head for the commission. As a result, on 21 May 2002, the government of Gujarat reconstituted the Commission into a two-member committee, and appointed retired Supreme Court judge G. T. Nanavati as chairman, which thus became known as the "Nanavati-Shah Commission." Shah died on 22 March 2008, just a few months before the commission was due to submit its interim report, and on 5 April 2008 the Gujarat High Court then appointed its retired judge Akshay H. Mehta to the committee on 6 April 2008. Commission is hence variously also known as the Shah-Nanavati Commission or the Nanavati-Shah-Mehta Commission. During its six-year probe, the commission examined more than 40,000 documents and the testimonies of more than 1,000 witnesses.

The credibility of the commission's report was called into question when the investigative magazine Tehelka released a video recording showing Arvind Pandya, counsel for the Gujarat government, discussing the commission. In the video, Pandya states that "Hindu leaders" need not concern themselves about the findings of the Shah-Nanavati commission; since Shah was "their man" and Nanavati could be bribed, the findings would definitely be in the BJP's favour. Pandya resigned from the post of counsel for the government, stating that he had been framed.

=== Terms of reference ===
Initially, the Terms of Reference of the commission were to inquire into the facts, circumstances and course of events that led to the burning of the S-6 coach of Sabarmati Express. On 20 July 2004, soon after the UPA government came to power in the centre, the scope of the commission was widened to include within its scope of inquiry, the role and conduct of the then Chief Minister Narendra Modi and/or any other Ministers in his council of ministers, police officers, other individuals and organizations. This action pre-empted the central government from constituting any other Commission, as section 3(b) the Commissions of Inquiry act of 1952 does not allow two simultaneous commissions into the same matter.

=== Term ===
The initial term of the committee was three months; however, its terms were extended for 24 times and its term ended on 31 October 2014.

== Functioning of the Commission and investigation ==
Inside view of the burnt S-6 coach of Sabarmati Express published in the commission's report

On 7 March 2002, the Commission started its functioning at Ahmedabad. On 20 April 2002, it issued a notification inviting persons acquainted with the subject matter of the inquiry relating to the Godhra incident and post-Godhra incidents to furnish to the Commission statements/affidavits. The inquiry was conducted by the commission as an open public inquiry and the public and media were also permitted to remain present at the time of hearings fixed by the commission. . except on one occasion when Mr. Rahul Sharma was asked some questions ‘in camera’ for ascertaining certain facts. That part of his evidence was also made available to the parties later on. It issued summons to railwaymen and higher officers to compel them to produce certain relevant documents. In total 46,494 statements/affidavits were received by the commission. Out of them 2019 were statements/affidavits filed by the Government officers and 44445 statements/ affidavits were received from the public.

The commission initially examined the burnt S-6 coach to see its condition and the damage caused to it and later in the light of the evidence collected by it.

== Part I of the report and conclusions ==
In September 2008, the Commission submitted its 168-paged Part I of the report, dealing with the Godhra train burning incident, which was tabled before the Gujarat Legislative Assembly. The report concludes that the burning of the S-6 coach of Sabarmati Express was a premeditated crime and not an accident. It further gave a clean chit to Gujarat Chief Minister Narendra Modi, saying there was no evidence to show that he or anybody in his Government was involved with incident.

=== Regarding train burning incident ===
Commission concluded that "there was a conspiracy to burn coach S-6 of the Sabarmati Express train to cause harm to the Karsevaks travelling in that coach." As per the commission, the conspiracy was hatched by some local Muslims at the Aman guest house in Godhra the previous night and the conspirators immediately made arrangements for collecting about 140 litres of petrol from a nearby pump on the night of 26 February 2002, the next day when the train arrived in Godhra, Hasan Lala, after forcibly opening the vestibule between coaches S-6 and S-7, entered S-6 and threw burning rags setting it on fire.

A dismissed Central Reserve Police Force officer named Nanumiyan, and Maulvi Husain Haji Ibrahim Umarji, a cleric in the town of Godhra, were presented as the masterminds behind the operation. The evidence collected by the committee in favour of this conclusion was a statement made by Jabir Binyamin Behra, a criminal who happened to be in custody at the time; however, he later denied giving any such statement. In addition, the alleged acquisition of 140 litres of petrol hours before the arrival of the train and the storage of this petrol at the house of Razzak Kurkur, accused of being a key conspirator, as well as forensic evidence supposedly demonstrating that fuel had been poured on the coach before it was burned, was presented by the committee. The report concluded that the train was attacked by thousands of Muslims from the Signal Falia area. The commission also concluded that there was no evidence regarding involvement of any definite religious or political organization in the conspiracy.

The Commission claimed that there was no evidence to justify the contention that the kar sevaks had been fighting with Muslim vendors at stations before the incident as was alleged earlier, though there were some minor scuffles with three Muslim vendors on the Godhra platform. But it concluded that there was no reliable evidence to show that any attempt was made by the kar sevaks to abduct Sofiabanu, Salim Panwala to spread a false rumor to that effect to collect a mob that started pelting stones on the passengers.

According to the report, setting fire to the train was part of a larger conspiracy to instill a sense of fear in the administration and create anarchy in the state.

=== Regarding role of Narendra Modi and other ministers and officials ===
The Commission concluded that there was "absolutely no evidence to show that either Modi, the then Chief Minister of Gujarat and/or any other minister(s) in his council of ministers or police officers had played any role in the Godhra incident or that there was any lapse on their part in the matter of providing protection, relief and rehabilitation to the victims of communal riots or in the matter of not complying with the recommendations and directions given by National Human Rights Commission."

== Final report ==
On 18 November 2014, the final report was submitted by the commission to the Gujarat government. The report runs in over 2000 pages and is contained in nine volumes.

== Responses to the findings in Part I ==
Bharatiya Janata Party welcomed the Part I of the report and termed it to be "most extensive, exhaustive and scientific". It said that the report would put an end to all theories which claim the burning of the train was an accident and that the fire broke out from inside.

Vishwa Hindu Parishad also welcomed the report. Its international secretary Pravin Togadia said that the report has established that Godhra train carnage was a "pre-planned attack."

The Communist Party of India (Marxist) and the Indian National Congress both objected to the exoneration of the Gujarat government by the commission, citing the timing of the report (with the general elections months away) as evidence of unfairness. Congress spokesperson Veerappa Moily commented at the strange absolvement of the Gujarat government for complacency for the carnage before the commission's second and final report had been brought out. The CPI (M) said that the report reinforced communal prejudices. The commission has come in for heavy criticism from academics such as Christophe Jaffrelot for obstructing the course of justice, supporting the conspiracy theory too quickly, and for allegedly ignoring evidence of governmental complicity in the incident.

The Concerned Citizens Tribunal (CCT), headed by Teesta Setalvad, carried out a separate investigation in 2002 and concluded that the fire had been accidental, stating that the attack by a mob was part of a government conspiracy to trigger violence across the state. Several other independent commentators have also concluded that the fire itself was almost certainly an accident, saying that the initial cause of the blaze would not ever be determined. The Nanavati-Shah Commission findings explicitly contradict these views.

== Court verdict ==
In February 2011, the trial court convicted 31 people and acquitted 63 others for conspiring to murder, saying the incident was a "pre-planned conspiracy." All of those convicted were Muslims. The judgement rested in part on the findings of the Nanavati-Shah Commission; however, Maulvi Umarji, presented by the commission as the chief conspirator, was cleared of all charges along with 62 others for insufficient evidence.
