= Kiss =

Touch with the lips, usually to express love, affection or greeting

A woman and a man kissing in Rostov-on-Don, Russia

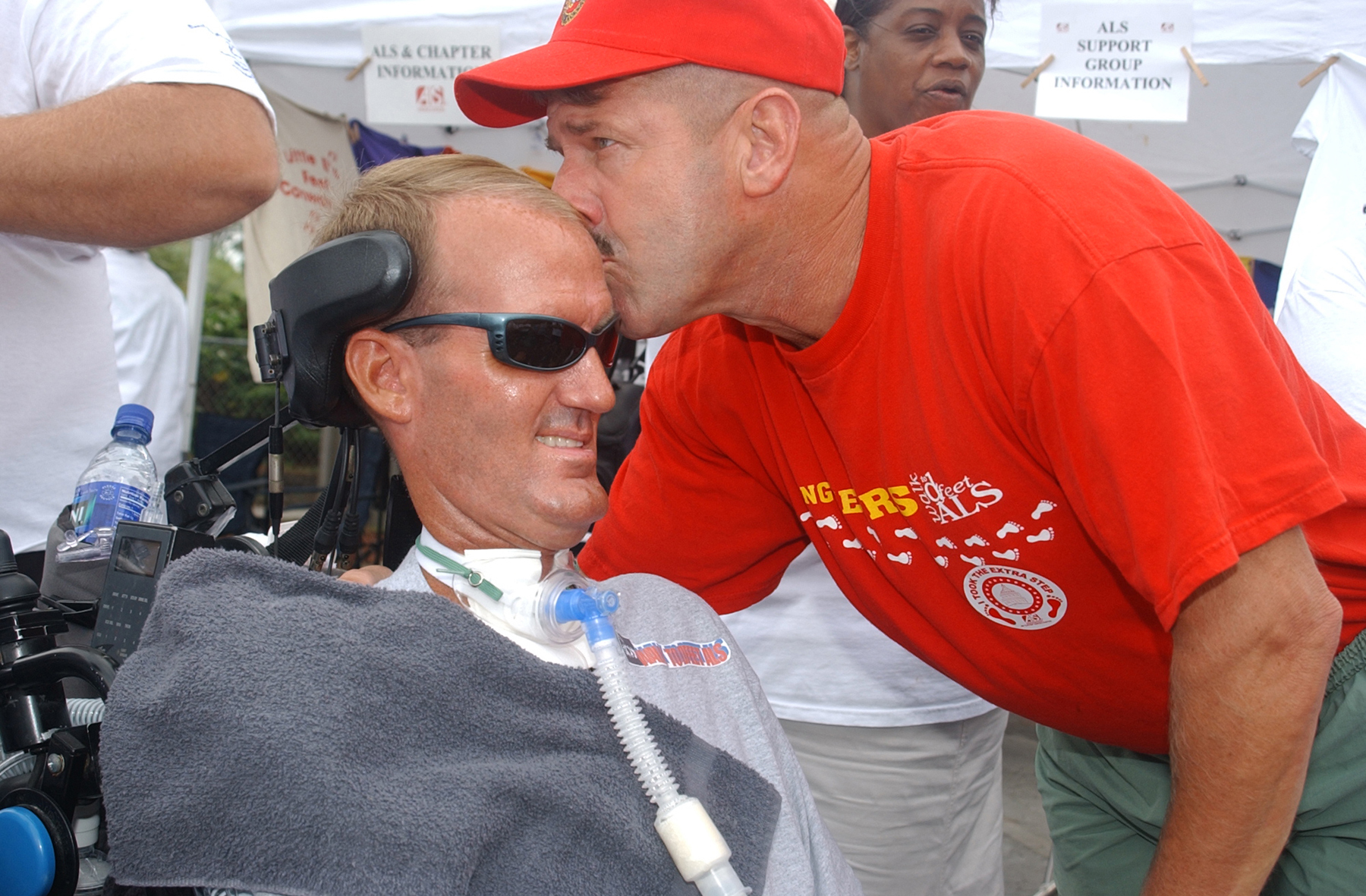
A forehead kiss

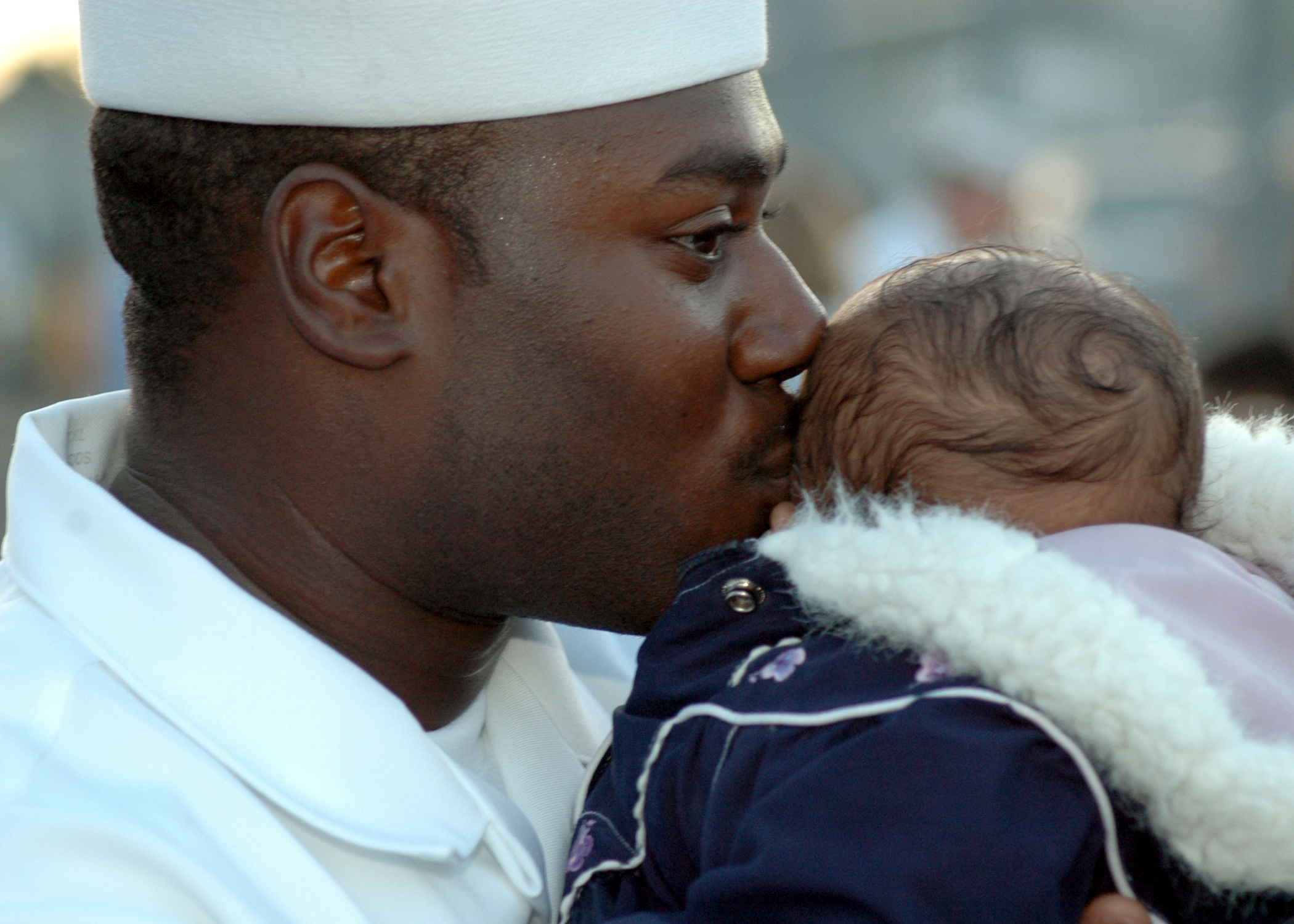
American sailor kissing his infant son

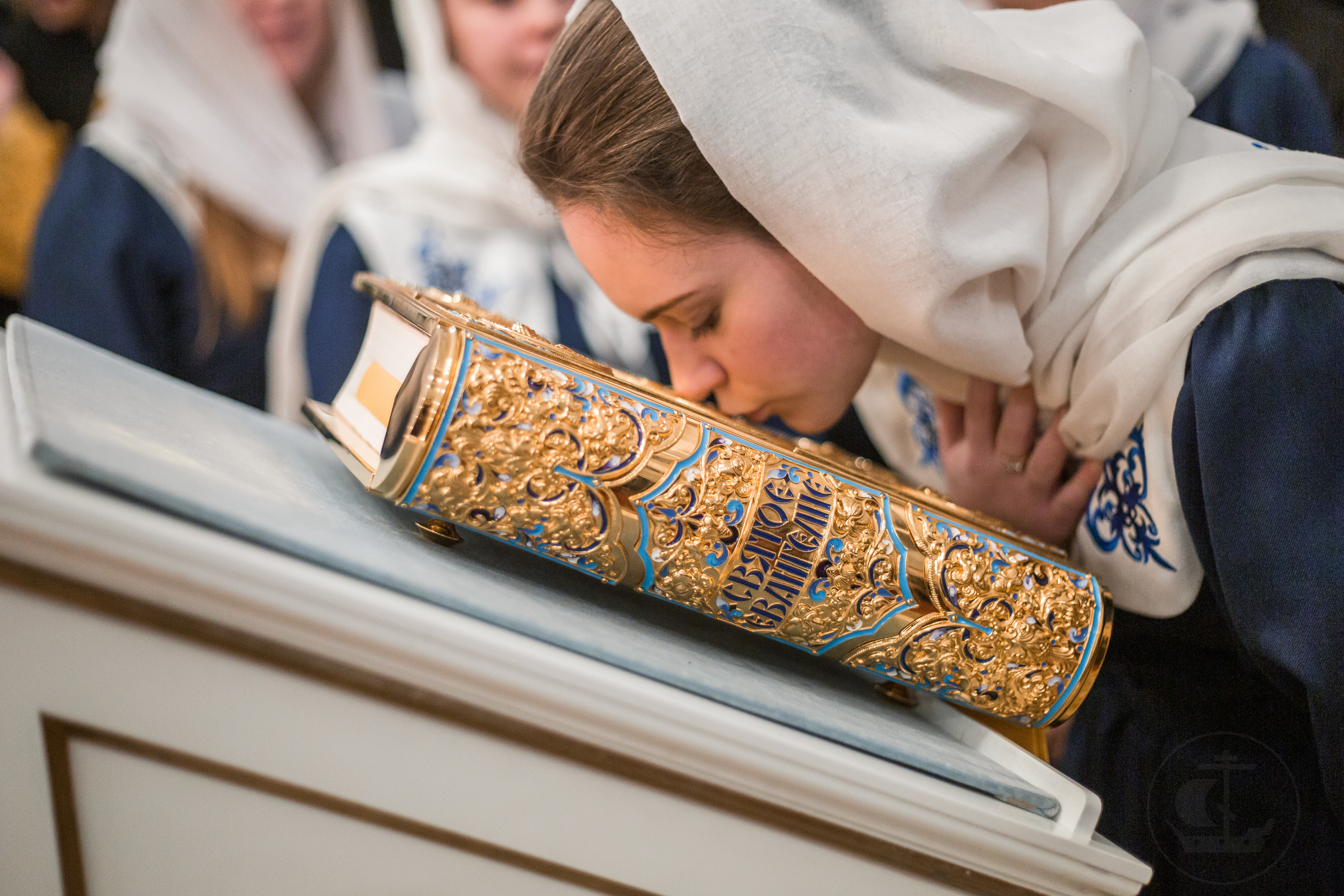
Kissing the gospel

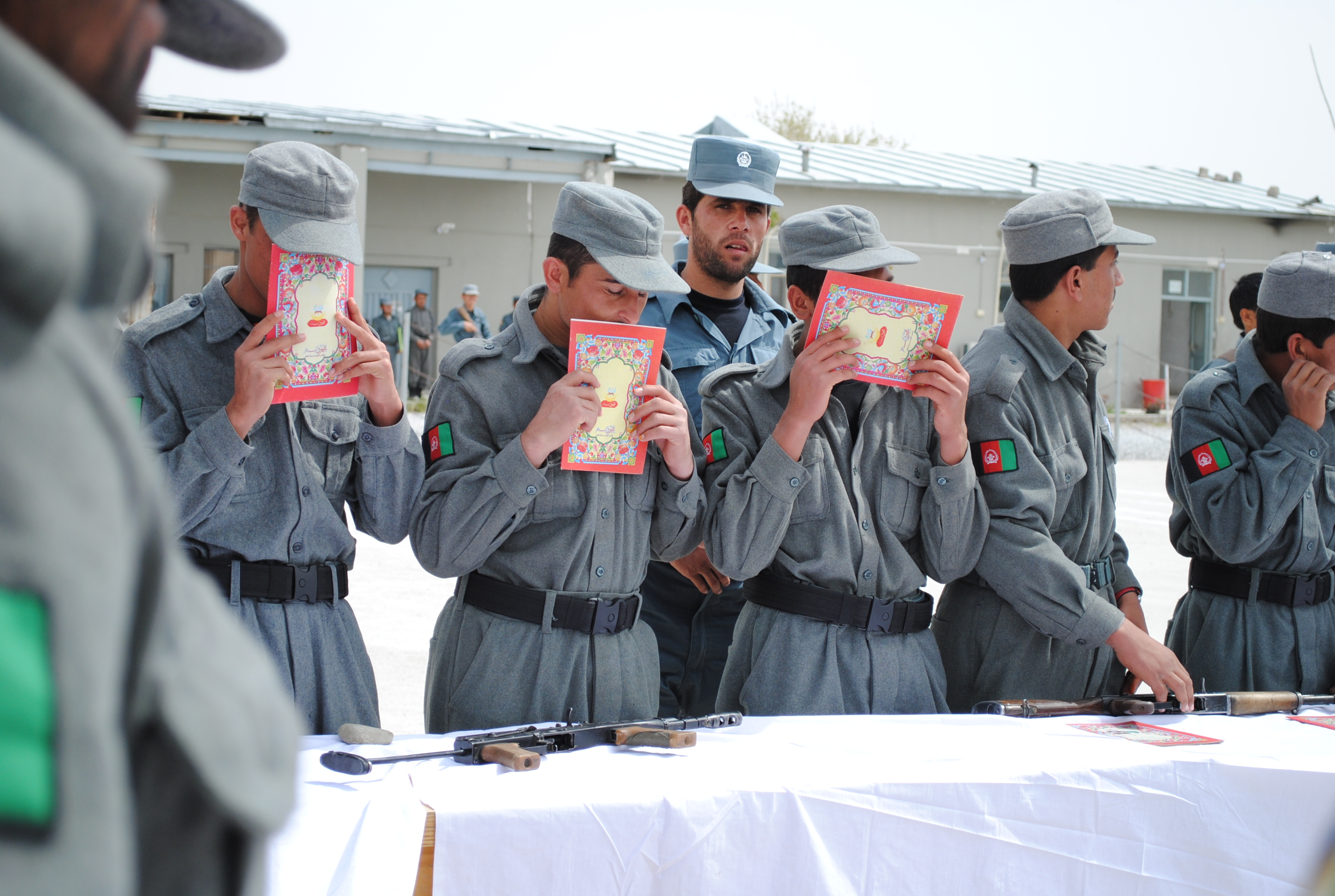
Graduates of the Basic Patrol Course in Afghanistan kiss the Quran after the graduation ceremony.

A kiss is the touching or pressing of one's lips against another person, animal, or object. The cultural connotations associated with kissing vary significantly between different societies and contexts. Depending on the culture and circumstances, a kiss can express a wide range of emotions, such as love, passion, romance, sexual attraction, sexual arousal, affection, respect, a wish for peace or good luck, as well as numerous other meanings. In some situations, kissing takes on the function of a greeting or a ritual, formal, or symbolic gesture indicating religious devotion, institutional respect, or an act of sacramental nature.

== History ==
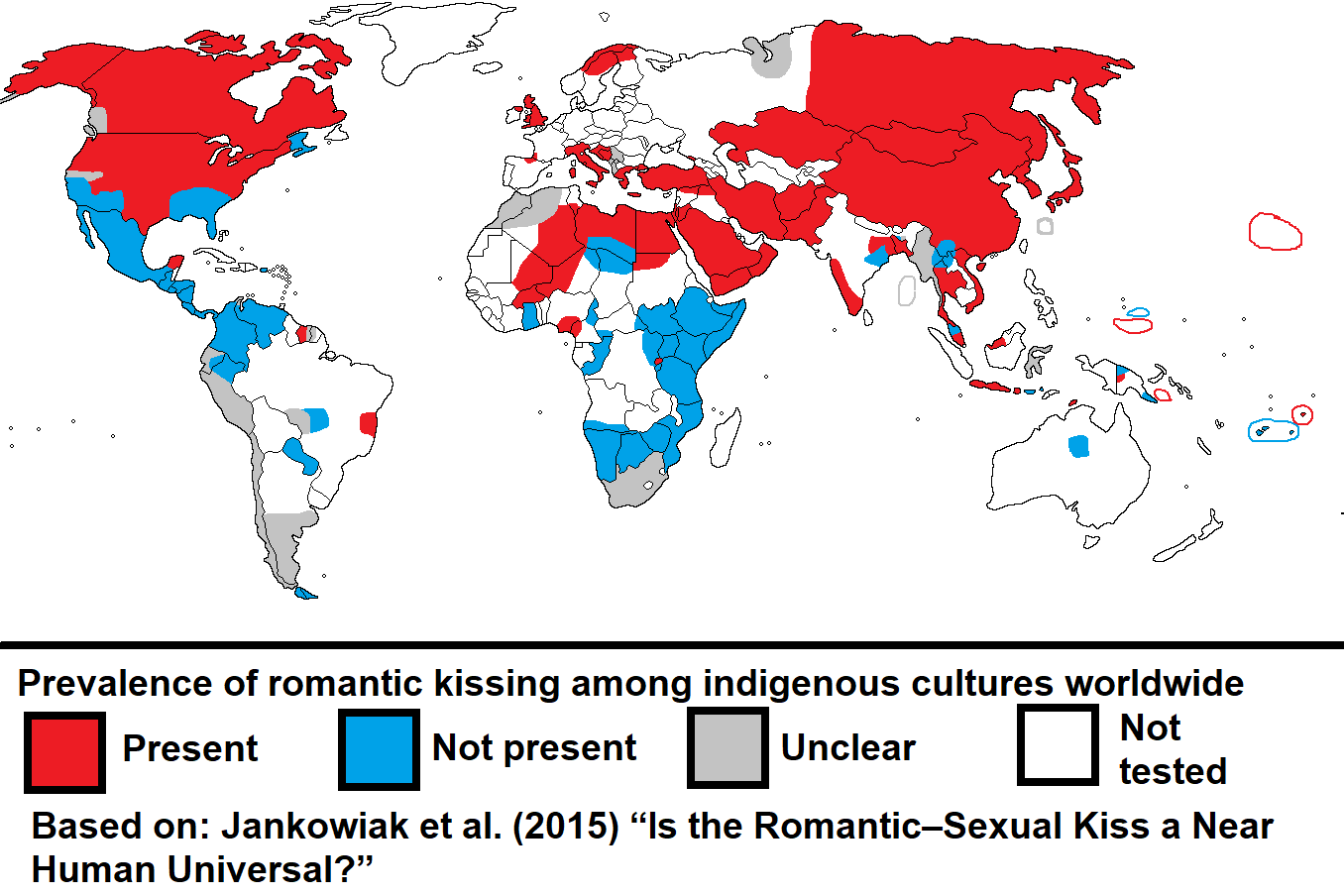
Prevalence of romantic-sexual kiss among indigenous cultures worldwide

Anthropologists disagree on whether kissing is an instinctual or learned behaviour. Those who believe kissing to be an instinctual behaviour cite similar behaviours in other animals such as bonobos, which are known to kiss after fighting - possibly to restore peace. Others believe that it is a learned behaviour, having evolved from activities such as suckling or premastication in early human cultures passed on to modern humans. The fact that not all human cultures kiss is used as an argument against kissing being an instinctual behaviour in humans; only around 90% of the human population is believed to practice kissing.

The earliest reference to kissing-like behavior comes from the Vedas, Sanskrit scriptures that informed Hinduism, Buddhism, and Jainism, around 3,500 years ago, according to Vaughn Bryant, an anthropologist at Texas A&M University who specialized in the history of the kiss. However, recent studies challenge the belief that kissing originated in South Asia around 1500 BCE, arguing that there is no single point of origin in historical times. Figurines have been found that indicate kissing may have been practiced in prehistory. It has been suggested that Neandertals and humans kissed. Evidence from ancient Mesopotamia and Egypt suggests that kissing was documented as early as 2500 BCE. Kissing was present in both romantic and familial contexts in ancient Mesopotamia, but it was subject to social regulation, and public display of the sexual aspect of kissing was discouraged. Kissing also had a role in rituals. The act of kissing may have unintentionally facilitated the transmission of orally transmitted microorganisms, potentially leading to disease. Advances in ancient DNA extraction have revealed pathogen genomes in human remains, including those transmitted through saliva. The shift in dominant lineages of the herpes simplex virus 1 (HSV-1) during the Bronze Age implies that cultural practices like romantic-sexual kissing could have contributed to its transmission. Ancient Mesopotamian medical texts mention a disease called bu'shanu, which may have been related to HSV-1 infection. While kissing itself was not directly associated with disease transmission in Mesopotamia, certain cultural and religious factors governed its practice.

Both lip and tongue kissing are mentioned in Sumerian poetry:

My lips are too small, they know not to kiss.

My precious sweet, lying by my heart,
one by one "tonguemaking," one by one.

When my sweet precious, my heart, had lain down too,
each of them in turn kissing with the tongue, each in turn.

Kissing is described in the surviving ancient Egyptian love poetry from the New Kingdom, found on papyri excavated at Deir el-Medina:

Finally I will drink life from your lips
and wake up from this ever lasting sleep.

The wisdom of the earth in a kiss
and everything else in your eyes.

I kiss her before everyone
that they all may see my love.

And when her lips are pressed to mine
I am made drunk and need not wine.
When we kiss, and her warm lips half open,
I fly cloud-high without beer!

His kisses on my lips, my breast, my hair...
...Come! Come! Come! And kiss me when I die,
For life, compelling life, is in thy breath;
And at that kiss, though in the tomb I lie,
I will arise and break the bands of Death.

The earliest reference to kissing in the Old Testament is in Genesis 27:26, when Jacob deceives his father to obtain his blessing:

And his father Isaac said unto him, Come near now, and kiss me, my son.

Genesis 29:11 features the first man-woman kiss in the Bible, when Jacob flees from Esau and goes to the house of his uncle Laban:

And Jacob kissed Rachel, and lifted up his voice, and wept.

Much later, there is the oft-quoted verse from Song of Songs 1:2:

May he kiss me with the kisses of his mouth,
for your love is better than wine.

In Cyropaedia (370 BC), Xenophon wrote about the Persian custom of kissing in the lips upon departure while narrating the departure of Cyrus the Great (c. 600 BC) as a boy from his Median kinsmen. According to Herodotus (5th century BC), when two Persians meet, the greeting formula expresses their equal or inequal status. They do not speak; rather, equals kiss each other on the mouth, and in the case where one is a little inferior to the other, the kiss is given on the cheek.

During the later Classical period, affectionate mouth-to-mouth kissing was first described in the Hindu epic the Mahabharata.

Anthropologist Vaughn Bryant argues kissing spread from India to Europe after Alexander the Great conquered parts of Punjab in northern India in 326 BCE.

Kissing was not always an indication of romantic love, but also could show respect and rank as it was used in Medieval Europe. For example, nobles would finalize a legal or diplomatic agreement by kissing each other. Contemporary views held that breaths contained aspects of a person's soul so a lip-to-lip kiss was believed to lead to the two souls intermingling.

The study of kissing started sometime in the nineteenth century and is called philematology, which has been studied by people including Cesare Lombroso, Ernest Crawley, Charles Darwin, Edward Burnett Tylor and modern scholars such as Elaine Hatfield.

=== Etymology ===
The Romans had several words for kissing. Kissing the hand or cheek was called an osculum. Kissing on the lips with mouth closed was called a basium, which was used between relatives. A kiss of passion was called a suavium.

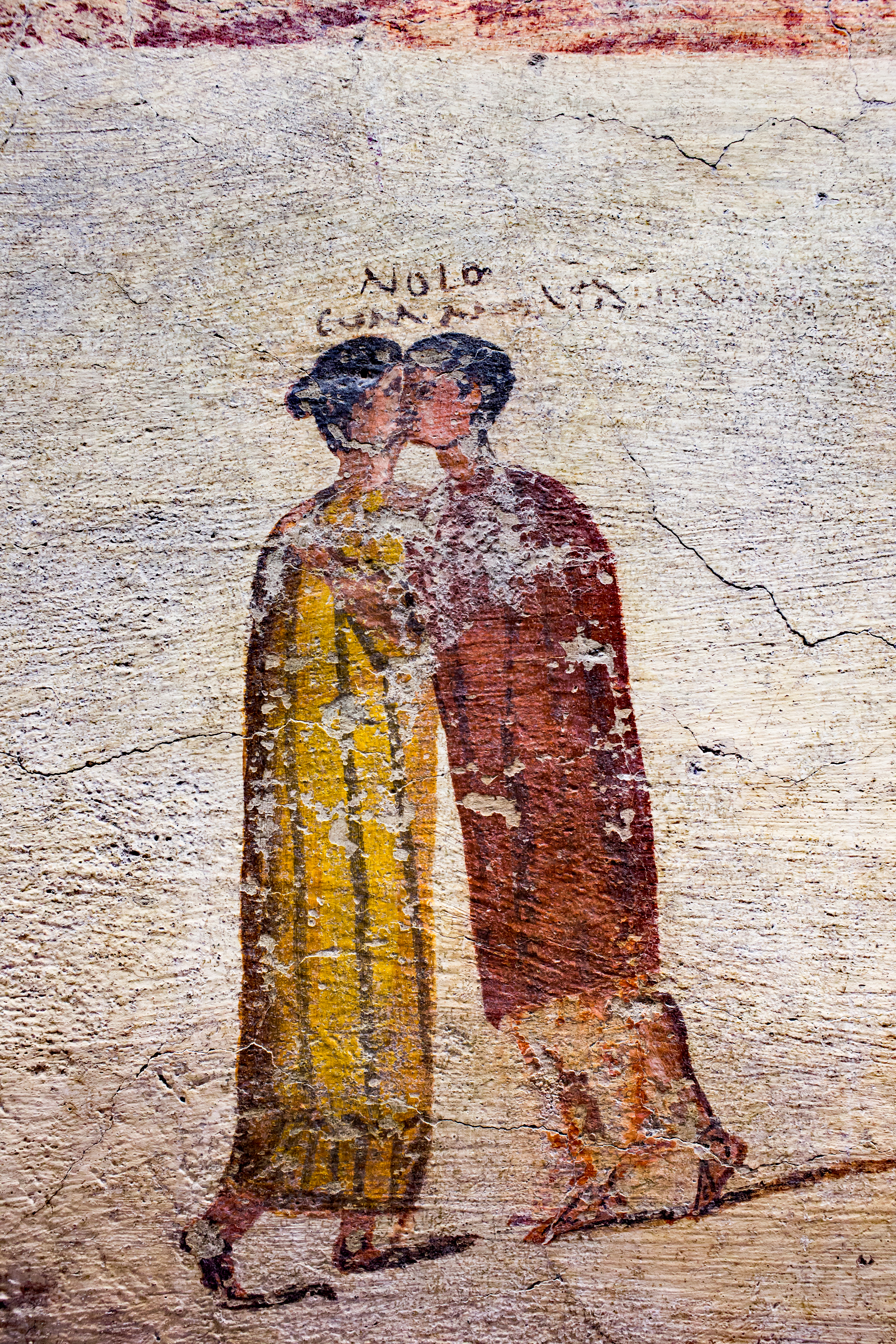
A fresco from Pompeii showing the kiss of a Roman couple

The English word kiss word comes from Old English cyssan ('to kiss'), in turn from coss ('a kiss').

== Types ==
Kristoffer Nyrop identified a number of types of kisses, including kisses of love, affection, peace, respect, and friendship. He notes, however, that the categories are somewhat contrived and overlapping, and some cultures have more kinds, including the French with twenty and the Germans with thirty.

=== Expression of affection ===
Kissing another person's lips has become a common expression of affection or warm greeting in many cultures worldwide. Yet in certain cultures, kissing was introduced only through European settlement, before which it was not a routine occurrence. Such cultures include certain indigenous peoples of Australia, the Tahitians, and many tribes in Africa.

A kiss can also be used to express feelings without an erotic element but can be nonetheless "far deeper and more lasting", writes Nyrop. He adds that such kisses can be expression of love "in the widest and most comprehensive meaning of the word, bringing a message of loyal affection, gratitude, compassion, sympathy, intense joy, and profound sorrow."

Nyrop writes that the most common example is the "intense feeling which knits parents to their offspring", but he adds that kisses of affection are not only common between parents and children, but also between other members of the same family, which can include those outside the immediate family circle, "everywhere where deep affection unites people." The tradition is written of in the Bible, as when Esau met Jacob after a long separation, he ran towards him, fell on his neck, and kissed him (Genesis 33:4), Moses greeted his father-in-law and kissed him (Exodus 18:7), and Orpah kissed her mother-in-law before leaving her (Ruth 1:14). The family kiss was traditional with the Romans and kisses of affection are often mentioned by the early Greeks, as when Odysseus, on reaching his home, meets his faithful shepherds.

Affection can be a cause of kissing "in all ages in grave and solemn moments," notes Nyrop, "not only among those who love each other, but also as an expression of profound gratitude. When the Apostle Paul took leave of the elders of the congregation at Ephesus, "they all wept sore, and fell on Paul's neck and kissed him" (Acts 20:37)." Kisses can also be exchanged between total strangers, as when there is a profound sympathy with or the warmest interest in another person.

Folk poetry has been the source of affectionate kisses where they sometimes played an important part, as when they had the power to cast off spells or to break bonds of witchcraft and sorcery, often restoring a man to his original shape. Nyrop notes the poetical stories of the "redeeming power of the kiss are to be found in the literature of many countries, especially, for example, in the Old French Arthurian romances (Lancelot, Guiglain) in which the princess is changed by evil arts into a dreadful dragon, and can only resume her human shape in the case of a knight being brave enough to kiss her." In the reverse situation, in the tale of "Beauty and the Beast", a transformed prince then told the girl that he had been bewitched by a wicked fairy, and could not be recreated into a man unless a maid fell in love with him and kissed him, despite his ugliness.

A kiss of affection can also take place after death. In Genesis 50:1, it is written that when Jacob was dead, "Joseph fell upon his father's face and wept upon him and kissed him." And it is told of Abu Bakr, Muhammad's first disciple, father-in-law, and successor, that, when the prophet was dead, he went into the latter's tent, uncovered his face, and kissed his forehead. Nyrop writes that "the kiss is the last tender proof of love bestowed on one we have loved, and was believed, in ancient times, to follow mankind to the nether world."

Kissing on the lips can be a physical expression of affection or love between two people in which the sensations of touch, taste, and smell are involved. According to the psychologist Menachem Brayer, although many "mammals, birds, and insects exchange caresses" which appear to be kisses of affection, they are not kisses in the human sense.

Surveys indicate that kissing is the second most common form of physical intimacy among United States adolescents (after holding hands), and that about 85% of 15 to 16-year-old adolescents in the US have experienced it.

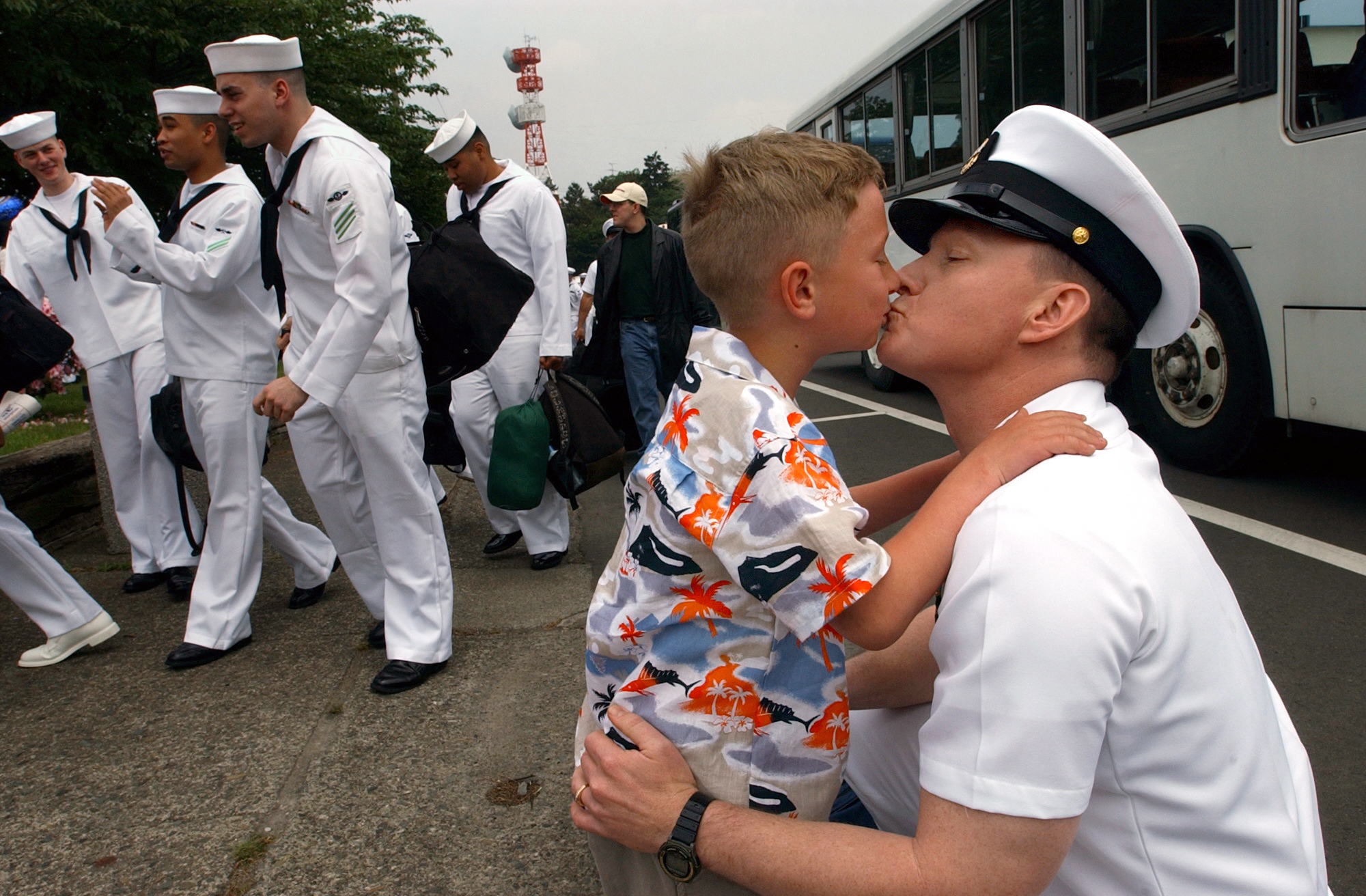
US Naval Officer's son welcomes his dad back from operation with a kiss

Affection between friends or family can sometimes be expressed by a kiss on the lips. Unlike kissing for love, a friendly kiss has no sexual connotation. The kiss on the lips is a practice that can be found in the time of patriarchs (Bible). In Ancient Greece, the kiss on the mouth was used to express a concept of equality between people of the same rank. In the Middle Ages, the kiss of peace was recommended by the Catholic Church. The kiss on the lips was also common among knights. The gesture has again become popular with young people, particularly in England.

==== Kiss of friendship ====
The kiss is also commonly used in American and European culture as a salutation between friends or acquaintances. The friendly kiss until recent times usually occurred only between ladies, but today it is also common between men and women, especially if there is a great difference in age. According to Nyrop, up until the 20th century, "it seldom or never takes place between men, with the exception, however, of royal personages," although he notes that in former times the "friendly kiss was very common with us between man and man as well as between persons of opposite sexes." In guilds, for example, it was customary for the members to greet each other "with hearty handshakes and smacking kisses," and, on the conclusion of a meal, people thanked and kissed both their hosts and hostesses.

=== Romantic ===
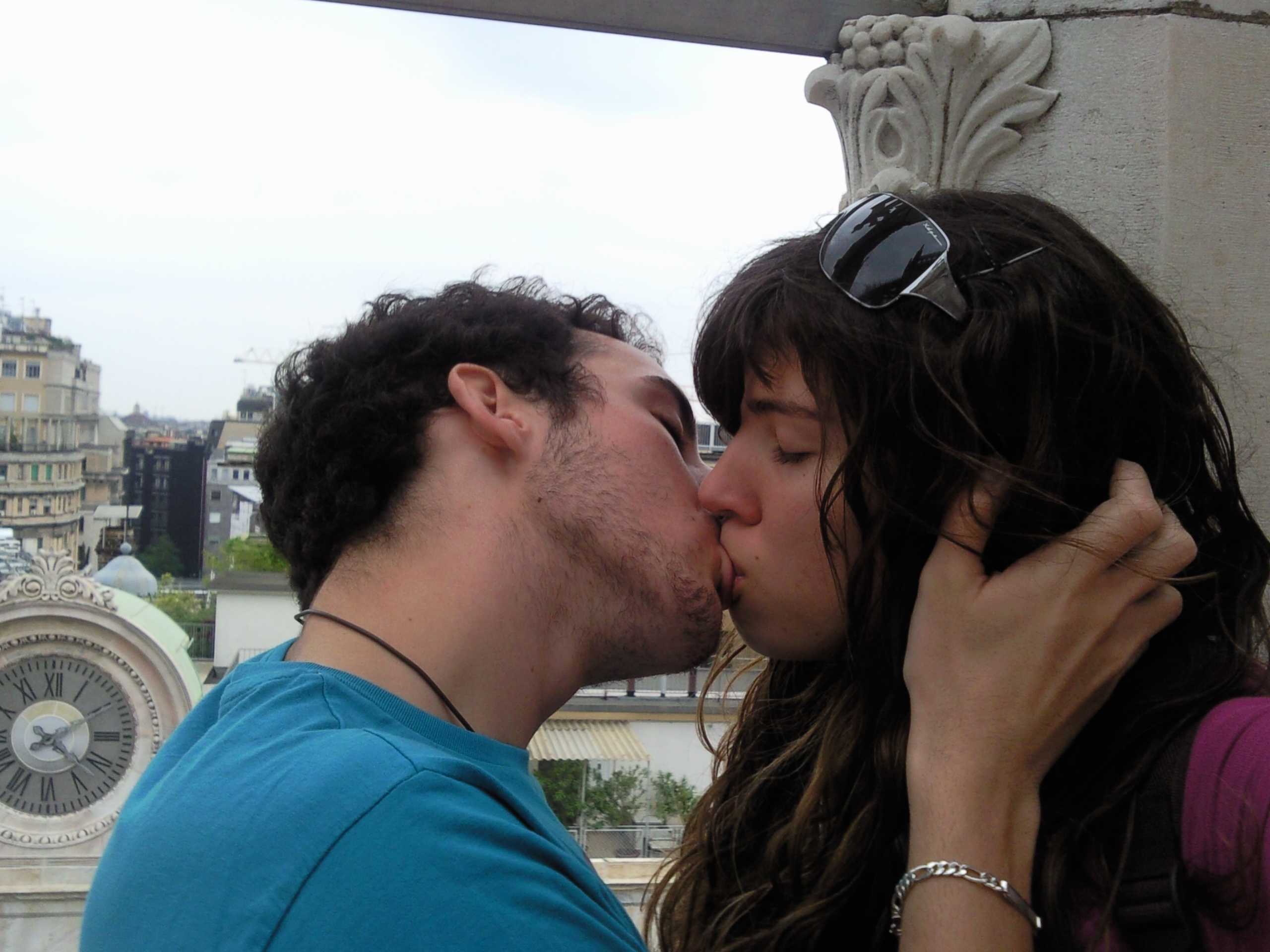
A heterosexual couple kissing

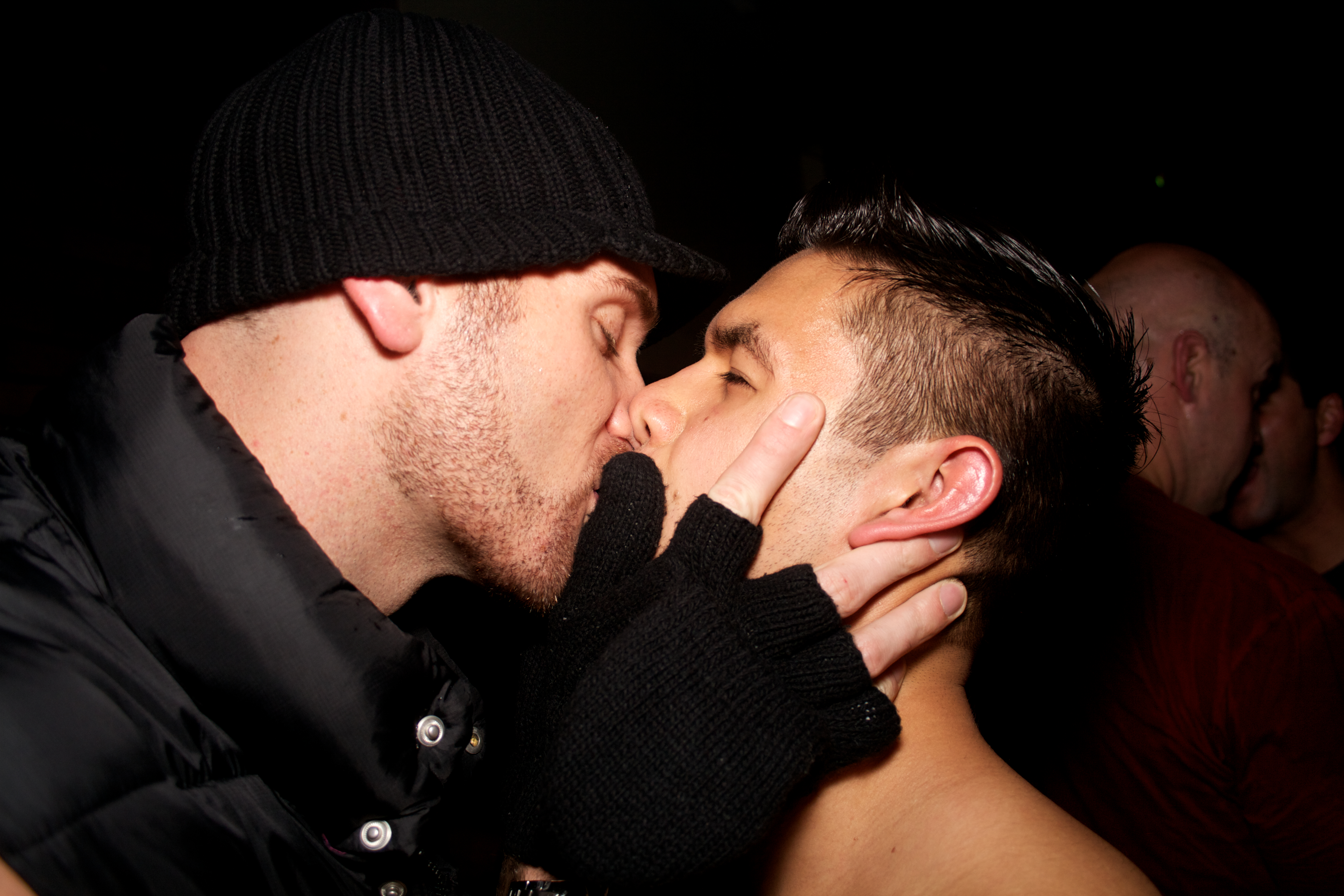
A gay couple kissing

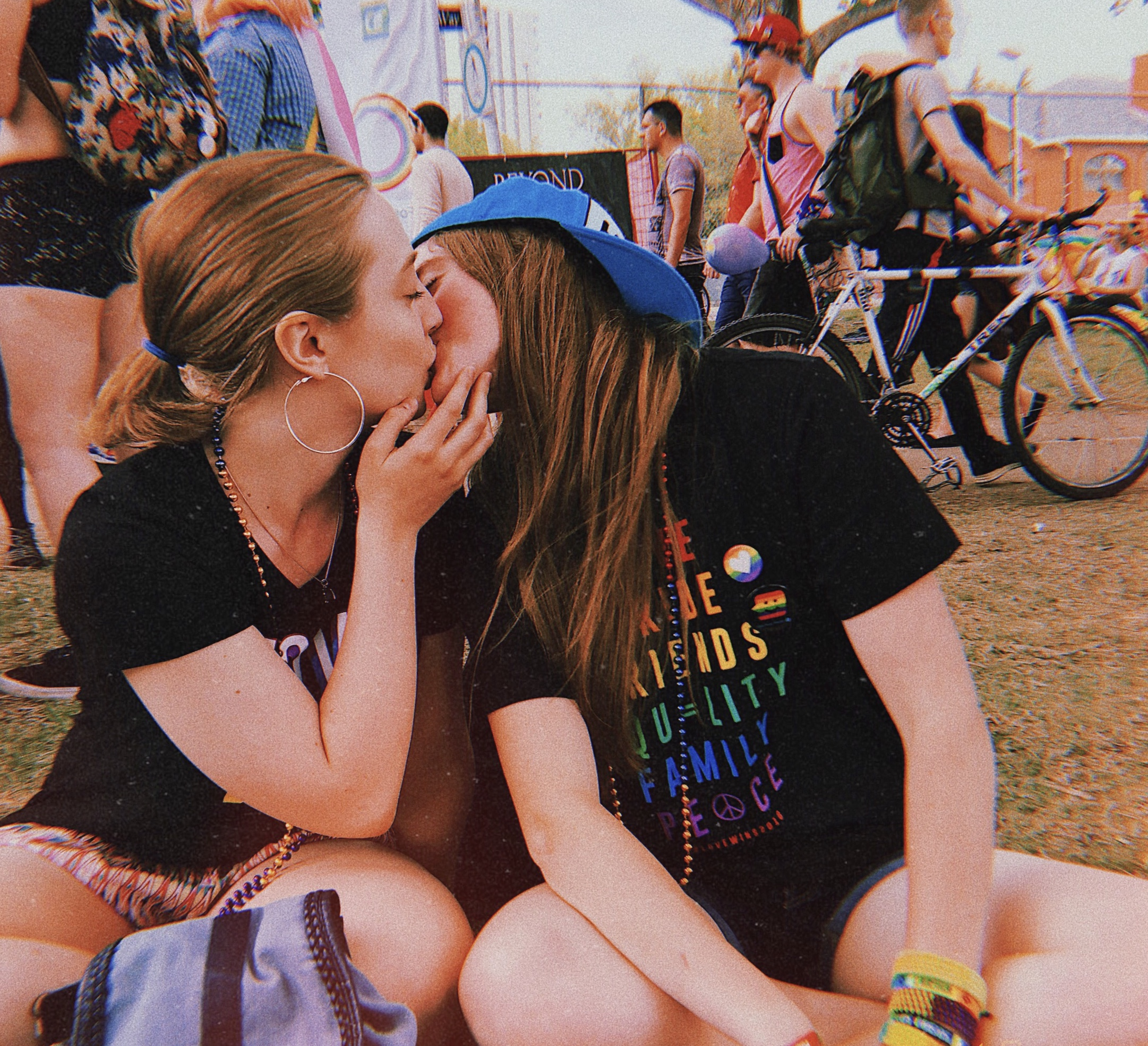
A lesbian couple kissing

In many cultures, it is considered a harmless custom for teenagers to kiss on a date or to engage in kissing games with friends. These games serve as icebreakers at parties and may be some participants' first exposure to sexuality. There are many such games, including truth or dare, seven minutes in heaven (or the variation "two minutes in the closet"), spin the bottle, post office, and wink. The psychologist William Cane notes that kissing in Western society is often a romantic act and describes a few of its attributes:

It's not hard to tell when two people are in love. Maybe they're trying to hide it from the world, still they cannot conceal their inner excitement. Men will give themselves away by a certain excited trembling in the muscles of the lower jaw upon seeing their beloved. Women will often turn pale immediately of seeing their lover and then get slightly red in the face as their sweetheart draws near. This is the effect of physical closeness upon two people who are in love.

Romantic kissing in Western cultures is a fairly recent development and is rarely mentioned even in ancient Greek literature. In the Middle Ages it became a social gesture and was considered a sign of refinement of the upper classes. Other cultures have different definitions and uses of kissing, notes Brayer. In China, for example, a similar expression of affection consists of rubbing one's nose against the cheek of another person. In other Eastern cultures kissing is not common. In South East Asian countries the "sniff kiss" is the most common form of affection and Western mouth to mouth kissing is often reserved for sexual foreplay.

The kiss can be an important expression of love and erotic emotions. In his book The Kiss and its History, Kristoffer Nyrop describes the kiss of love as an "exultant message of the longing of love, love eternally young, the burning prayer of hot desire, which is born on the lovers' lips, and 'rises,' as Charles Fuster has said, 'up to the blue sky from the green plains,' like a tender, trembling thank-offering." Nyrop adds that the love kiss, "rich in promise, bestows an intoxicating feeling of infinite happiness, courage, and youth, and therefore surpasses all other earthly joys in sublimity." He also compares it to achievements in life: "Thus even the highest work of art, yet, the loftiest reputation, is nothing in comparison with the passionate kiss of a woman one loves."

The power of a kiss is not minimized when he writes that "we all yearn for kisses and we all seek them; it is idle to struggle against this passion. No one can evade the omnipotence of the kiss ..." Kissing, he implies, can lead one to maturity: "It is through kisses that a knowledge of life and happiness first comes to us. Runeberg says that the angels rejoice over the first kiss exchanged by lovers," and can keep one feeling young: "It carries life with it; it even bestows the gift of eternal youth." The importance of the lover's kiss can also be significant, he notes: "In the case of lovers a kiss is everything; that is the reason why a man stakes his all for a kiss," and "man craves for it as his noblest reward."

As a result, kissing as an expression of love is contained in much of literature, old and new. Nyrop gives a vivid example in the classic love story of Daphnis and Chloe. As a reward "Chloe has bestowed a kiss on Daphnis—an innocent young-maid's kiss, but it has on him the effect of an electrical shock":

Ye gods, what are my feelings. Her lips are softer than the rose's leaf, her mouth is sweet as honey, and her kiss inflicts on me more pain than a bee's sting. I have often kissed my kids, I have often kissed my lambs, but never have I known aught like this. My pulse is beating fast, my heart throbs, it is as if I were about to suffocate, yet, nevertheless, I want to have another kiss. Strange, never-suspected pain! Has Chloe, I wonder, drunk some poisonous draught ere she kissed me? How comes it that she herself has not died of it?

Romantic kissing "requires more than simple proximity," notes Cane. It also needs "some degree of intimacy or privacy, ... which is why you'll see lovers stepping to the side of a busy street or sidewalk." Psychologist Wilhelm Reich "lashed out at society" for not giving young lovers enough privacy and making it difficult to be alone. However, Cane describes how many lovers manage to attain romantic privacy despite being in a public setting, as they "lock their minds together" and thereby create an invisible sense of "psychological privacy." He adds, "In this way they can kiss in public even in a crowded plaza and keep it romantic." Nonetheless, when Cane asked people to describe the most romantic places they ever kissed, "their answers almost always referred to this ends-of-the-earth isolation, ... they mentioned an apple orchard, a beach, out in a field looking at the stars, or at a pond in a secluded area ..."

==== French ====
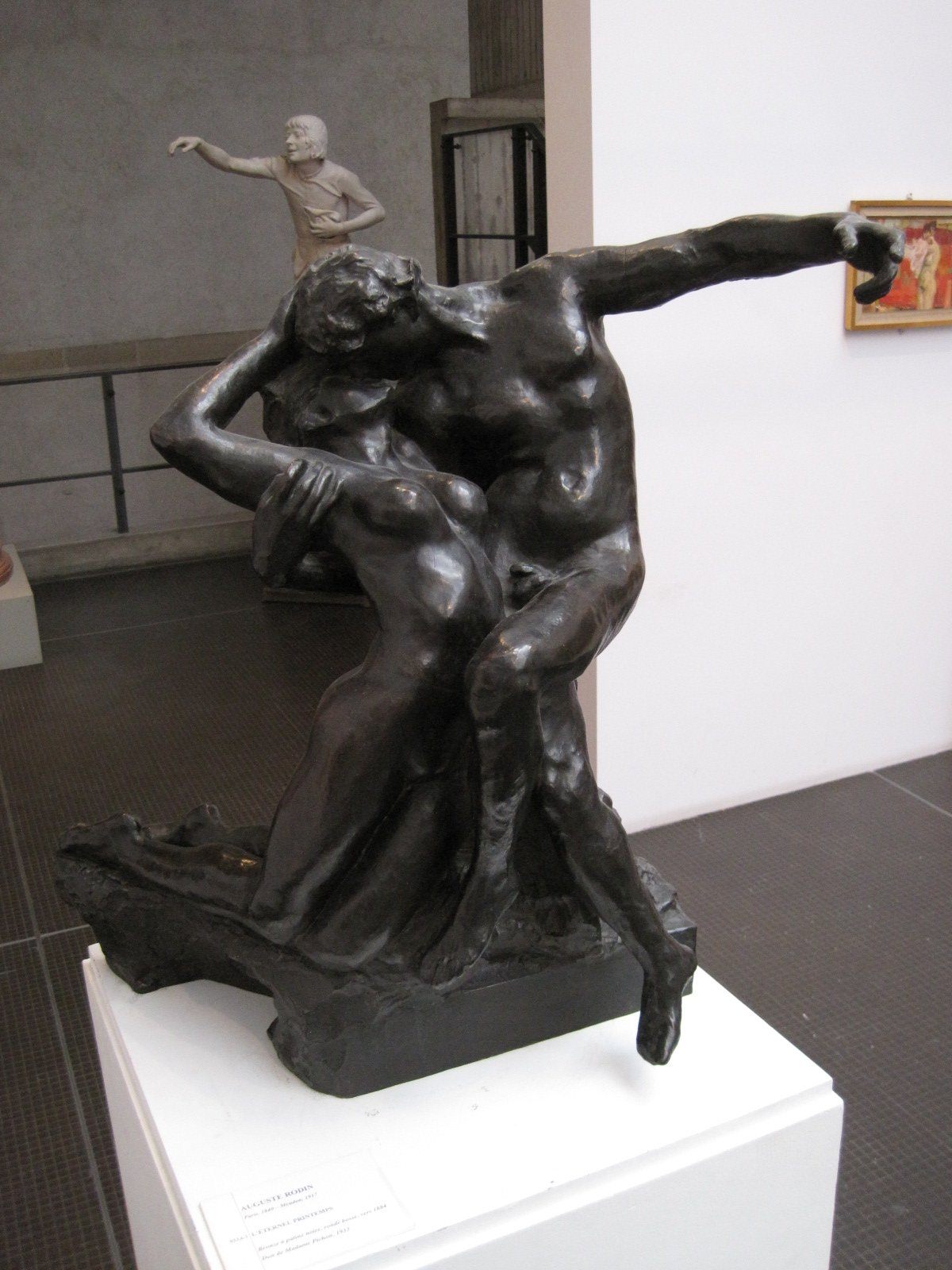
Eternal Spring - Bronze with black patina - Circa 1884 - by Auguste Rodin - Besançon Museum of Fine Arts

A French kiss, also known as cataglottism or a tongue kiss, is an amorous kiss in which the participants' tongues extend to touch each other's lips or tongue. A kiss with the tongue stimulates the partner's lips, tongue and mouth, which are sensitive to the touch and induce sexual arousal. The sensation when two tongues touch—also known as tongue touching—has been proven to stimulate endorphin release and reduce acute stress levels. Extended French kissing may be part of making out. The term originated at the beginning of the 20th century, in America and Great Britain, as the French had acquired a reputation for more adventurous and passionate sex practices.

French kissing may be a mode for disease transmission, particularly if there are open wounds.

=== Ritual ===
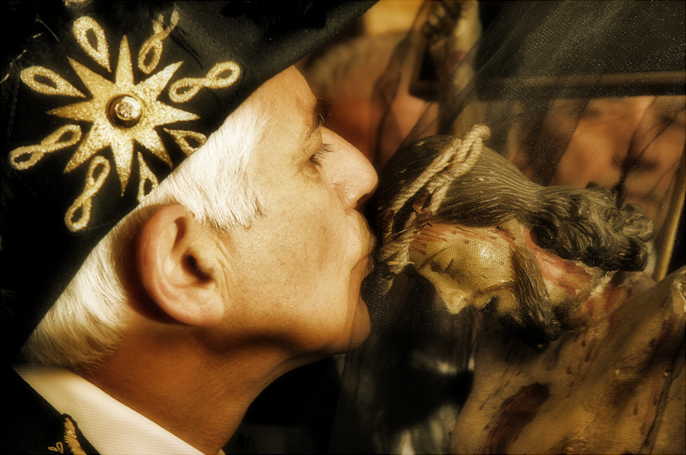
Kiss on the crucifix in Catholicism

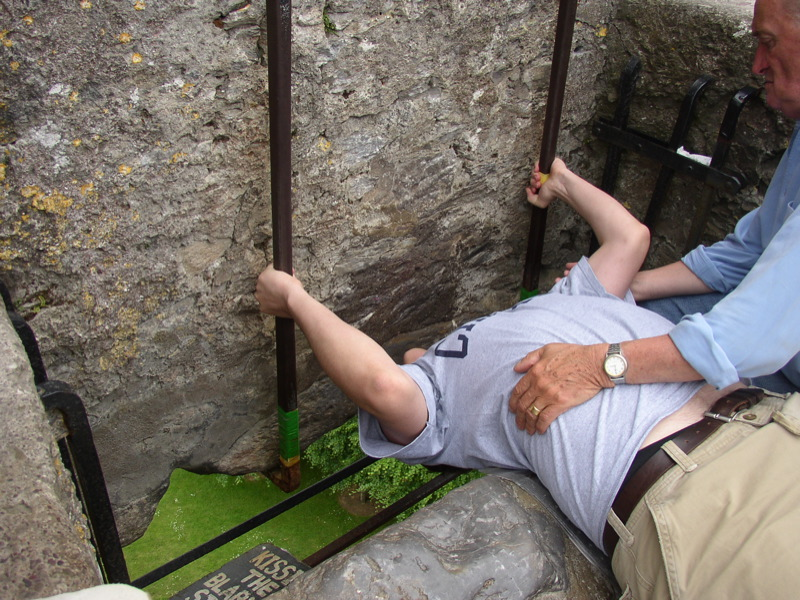
Kissing the Blarney Stone

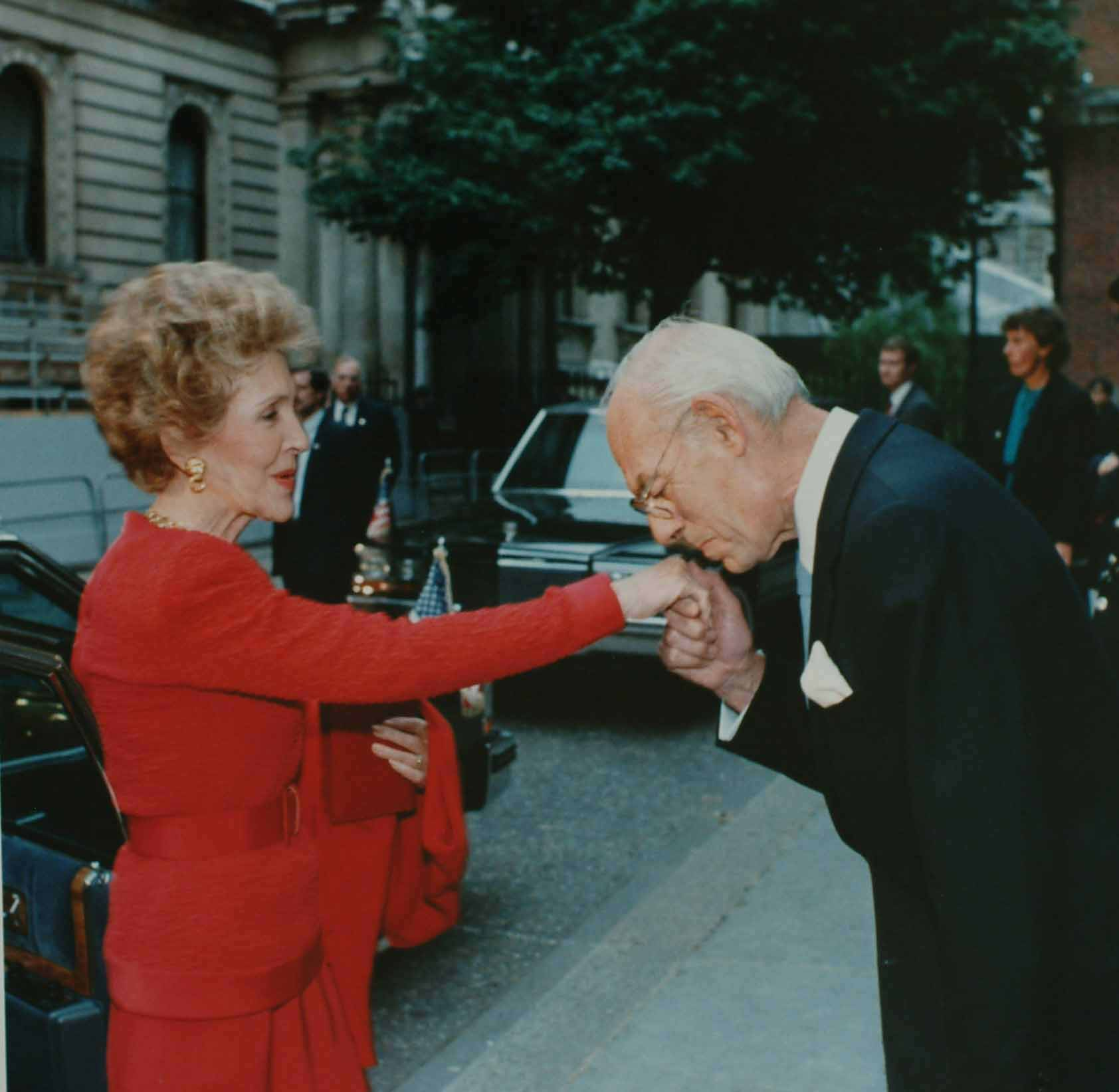
Denis Thatcher, husband of British prime minister Margaret Thatcher, kissing the hand of Nancy Reagan wife of US president Ronald Reagan in 1988

Throughout history, a kiss has been a ritual, formal, symbolic or social gesture indicating devotion, respect or greeting. It appears as a ritual or symbol of religious devotion. For example, in the case of kissing a temple floor, or a religious book or icon. Besides devotion, a kiss has also indicated subordination or, nowadays, respect.

In modern times the practice continues, as in the case of a bride and groom kissing at the conclusion of a wedding ceremony or national leaders kissing each other in greeting, and in many other situations.

==== Religion ====
A kiss in a religious context is common. In earlier periods of Christianity or Islam, kissing became a ritual gesture, and is still treated as such in certain customs, as when "kissing... relics, or a bishop's ring." In Judaism, the kissing of the Torah scroll, a prayer book, and a prayer shawl is also common. Crawley notes that it was "very significant of the affectionate element in religion" to give so important a part to the kiss as part of its ritual. In the early Church the baptized were kissed by the celebrant after the ceremony, and its use was even extended as a salute to saints and religious heroes, with Crawley adding, "Thus Joseph kissed Jacob, and his disciples kissed Paul. Joseph kissed his dead father, and the custom was retained in our civilization", as the farewell kiss on dead relatives, although certain sects prohibit this today.

A distinctive element in the Christian liturgy was noted by Justin in the 2nd century, now referred to as the "kiss of peace," and once part of the rite in the primitive Mass. Conybeare has stated that this act originated within the ancient Hebrew synagogue, and Philo, the ancient Jewish philosopher called it a "kiss of harmony", where, as Crawley explains, "the Word of God brings hostile things together in concord and the kiss of love." Saint Cyril also writes, "this kiss is the sign that our souls are united, and that we banish all remembrance of injury."

Nyrop notes that the kiss of peace was used as an expression of deep, spiritual devotion in the early Christian Church. Christ said, for instance, "Peace be with you, my peace I give you," and the members of Christ's Church gave each other peace symbolically through a kiss. St Paul repeatedly speaks of the "holy kiss," and, in his Epistle to the Romans, writes: "Salute one another with an holy kiss" and his first Epistle to the Thessalonians (1 Thessalonians 5:26), he says: "Greet all the brethren with an holy kiss."

The kiss of peace was also used in secular festivities. During the Middle Ages, for example, Nyrop points out that it was the custom to "seal the reconciliation and pacification of enemies by a kiss." Even knights gave each other the kiss of peace before proceeding to the combat, and forgave one another all real or imaginary wrongs. The holy kiss was also found in the ritual of the Church on solemn occasions, such as baptism, marriage, confession, ordination, or obsequies. However, toward the end of the Middle Ages the kiss of peace disappears as the official token of reconciliation.

==== Kiss of respect ====
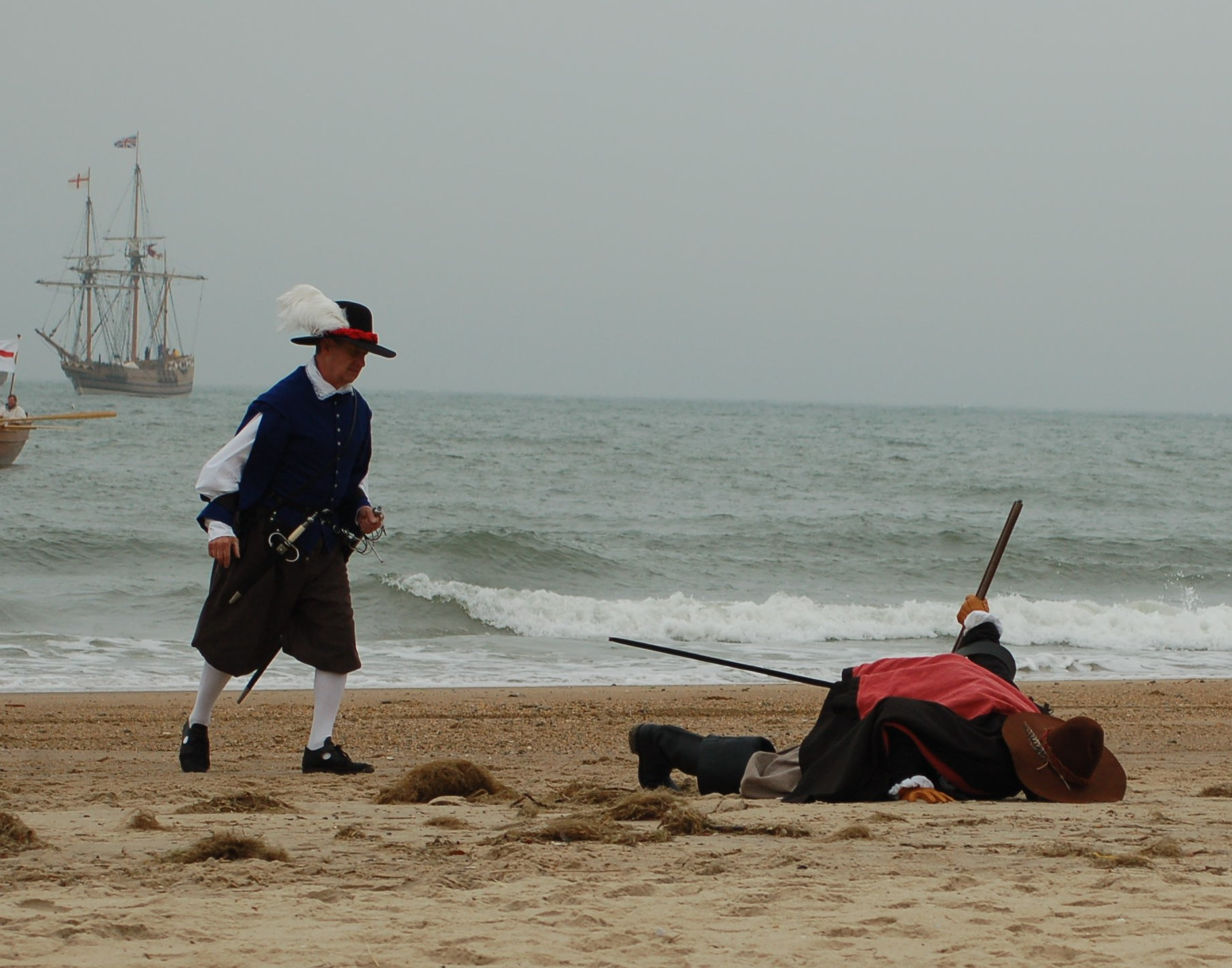
Man kissing the ground after a long sea voyage (as part of a reenactment of the first landing of English settlers in Virginia in 1607)

The kiss of respect is of ancient origin, notes Nyrop. He writes that "from the remotest times we find it applied to all that is holy, noble, and worshipful—to the gods, their statues, temples, and altars, as well as to kings and emperors; out of reverence, people even kissed the ground, and both sun and moon were greeted with kisses."

He notes some examples, as "when the prophet Hosea laments over the idolatry of the children of Israel, he says that they make molten images of calves and kiss them" (Hosea 13:2). In classical times similar homage was often paid to the gods, and people were known to kiss the hands, knees, feet, and the mouths, of their idols. Cicero writes that the lips and beard of the famous statue of Hercules at Agrigentum were worn away by the kisses of devotees.

People kissed the cross with the image of Jesus, and such kissing of the cross is always considered a holy act. In many countries it is required, on taking an oath, as the highest assertion that the witness would be speaking the truth. Nyrop notes that "as a last act of charity, the image of the Redeemer is handed to the dying or death-condemned to be kissed." Kissing the cross brings blessing and happiness; people kiss the image of Mary and the pictures and statues of saints—not only their pictures, "but even their relics are kissed," notes Nyrop. "They make both soul and body whole." There are legends innumerable of sick people regaining their health by kissing relics, he points out.

The kiss of respect has also represented a mark of fealty, humility and reverence. Its use in ancient times was widespread, and Nyrop gives examples: "people threw themselves down on the ground before their rulers, kissed their footprints, literally 'licked the dust,' as it is termed." "Nearly everywhere, wheresoever an inferior meets a superior, we observe the kiss of respect. The Roman slaves kissed the hands of their masters; pupils and soldiers those of their teachers and captains respectively." People also kissed the earth for joy on returning to their native land after a lengthened absence, as when Agamemnon returned from the Trojan War.

== Cultural significance ==
In approximately 10% of the world population, kissing does not take place, for a variety of reasons, including that they find it dirty or because of superstitious reasons. For example, in parts of Sudan it is believed that the mouth is the portal to the soul, so they do not want to invite death or have their spirit taken. Psychology professor Elaine Hatfield noted that "kissing was far from universal and even seen as improper by many societies." The romantic–sexual kiss is present in only about half of the global cultures.

Despite kissing being widespread, in some parts of the world it is still taboo to kiss publicly and is often banned in films or in other media.

=== As a theme in art ===
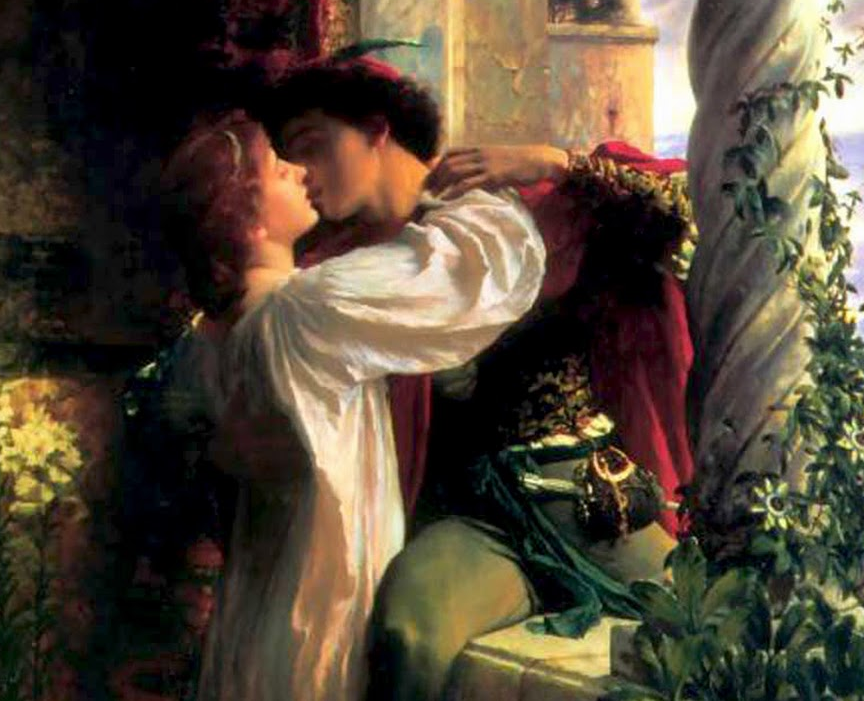
Romeo and Juliet
by Sir Frank Dicksee (1884)

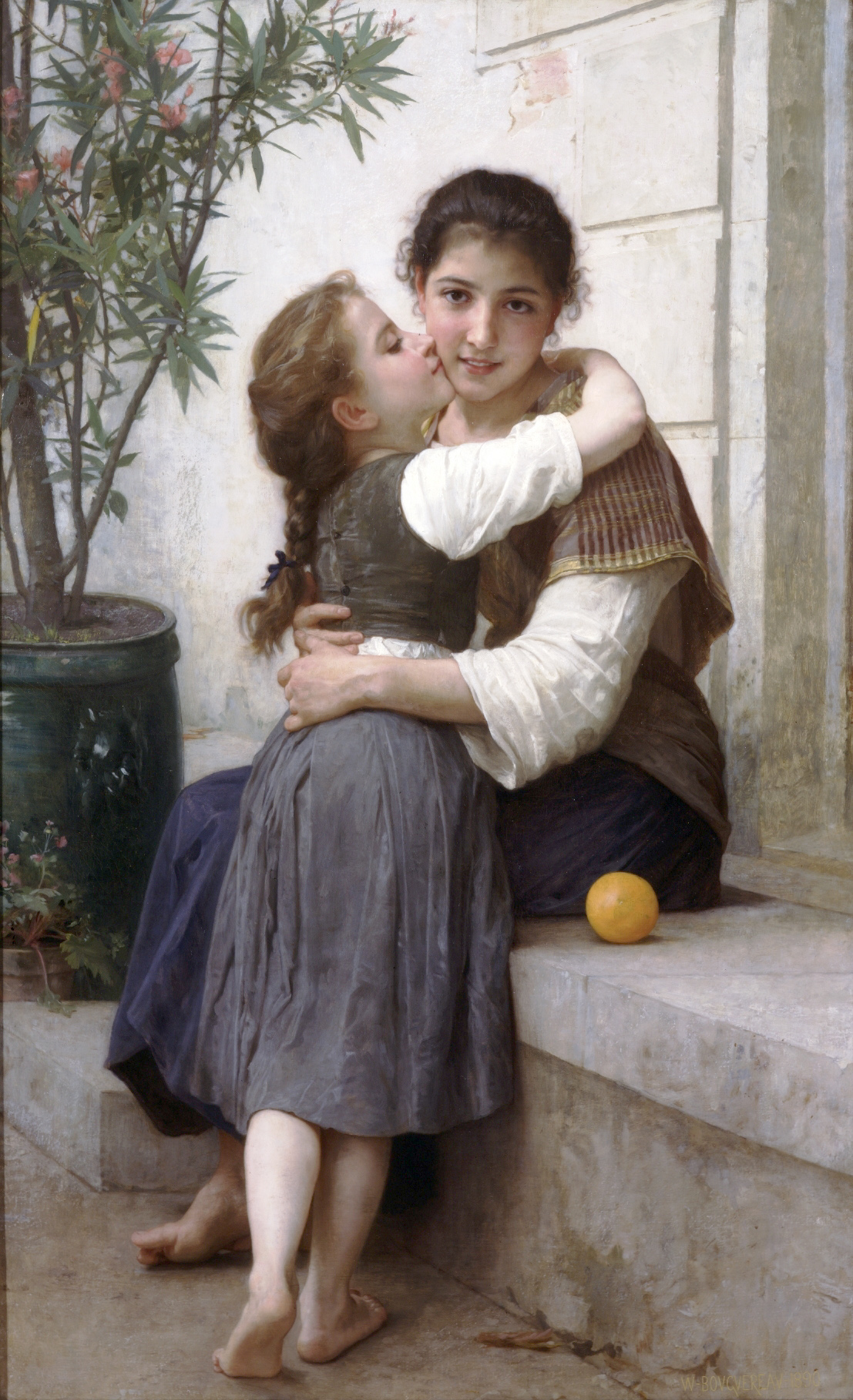
A Little Coaxing (1890)
by William-Adolphe Bouguereau (1825-1905)

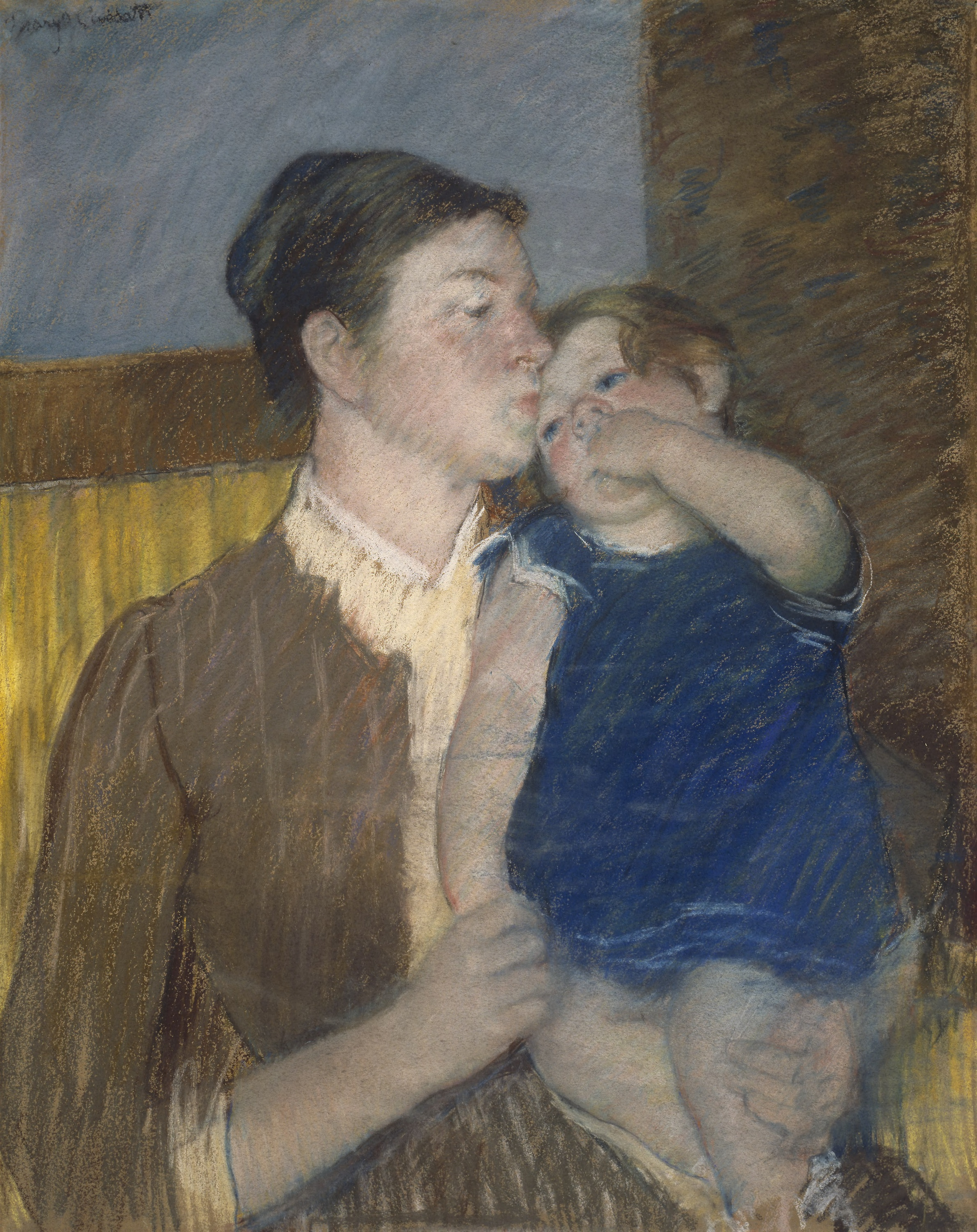
Mother's Goodnight Kiss
by Mary Cassatt

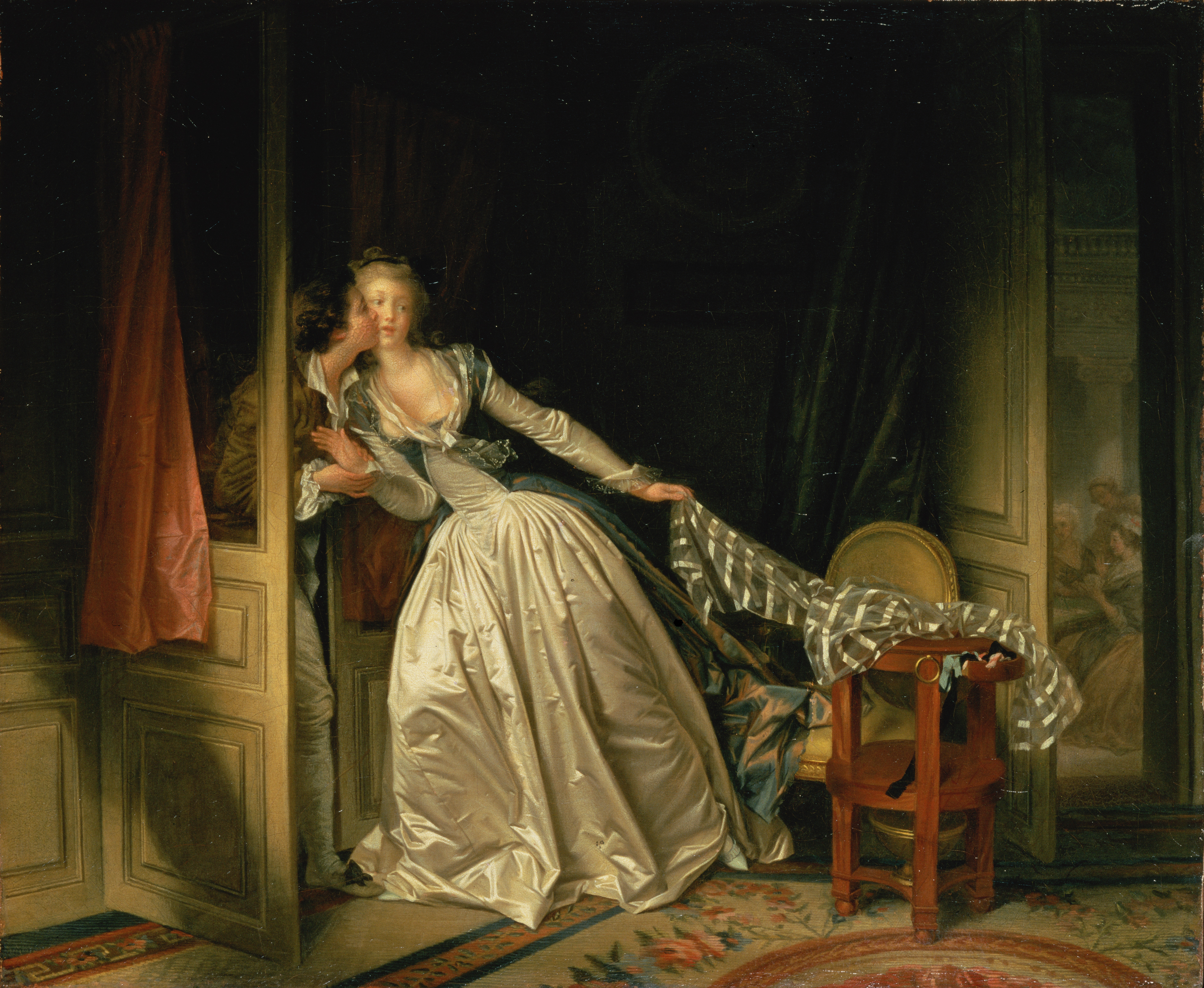
Jean-Honoré Fragonard
The Stolen Kiss (1786)

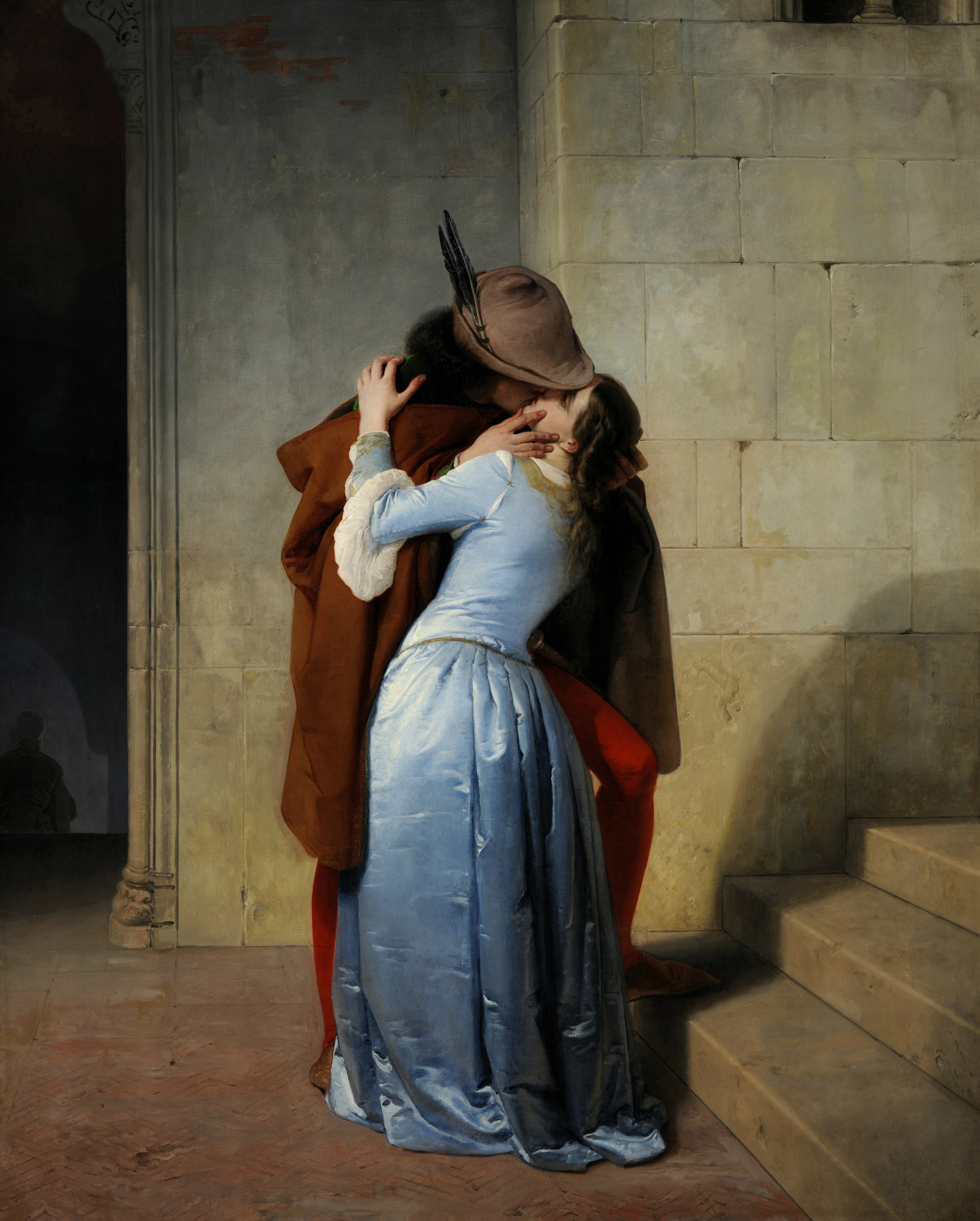
The Kiss
by Francesco Hayez (1859)

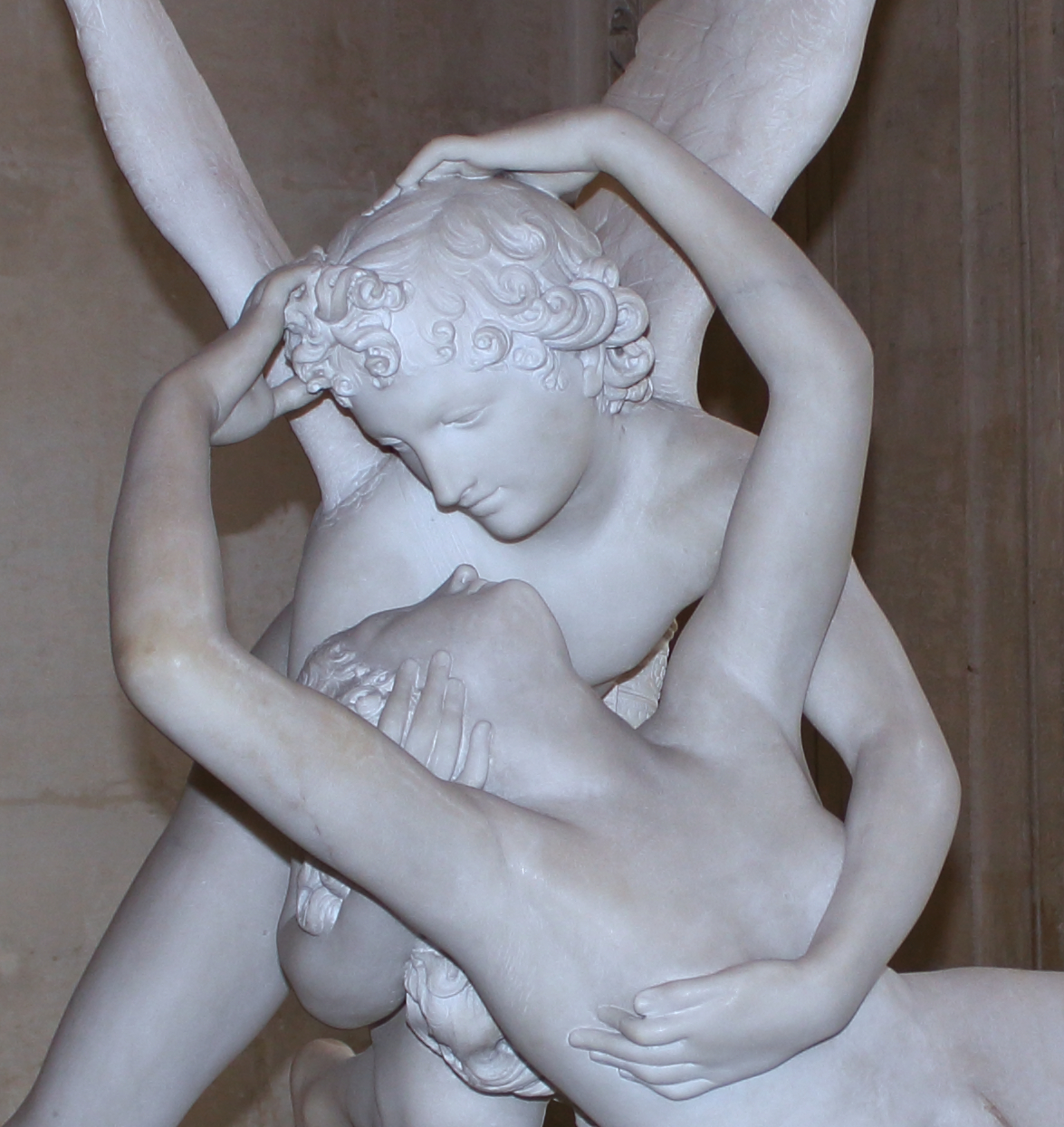
Psyche Revived by Cupid's Kiss
by Antonio Canova

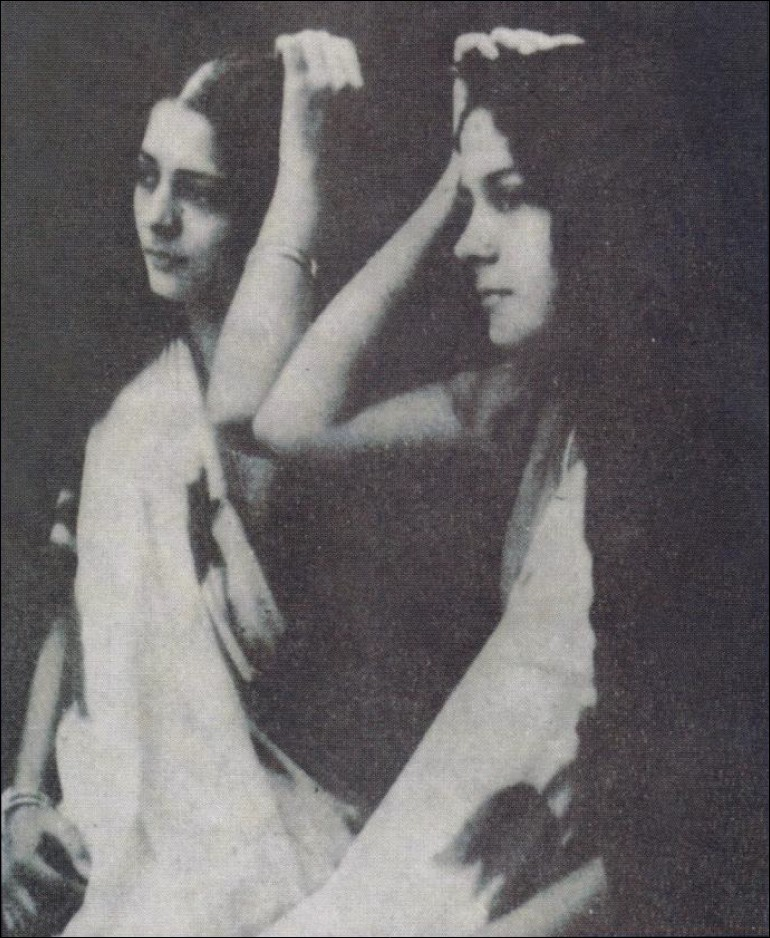
The Last Kiss (1931 film)

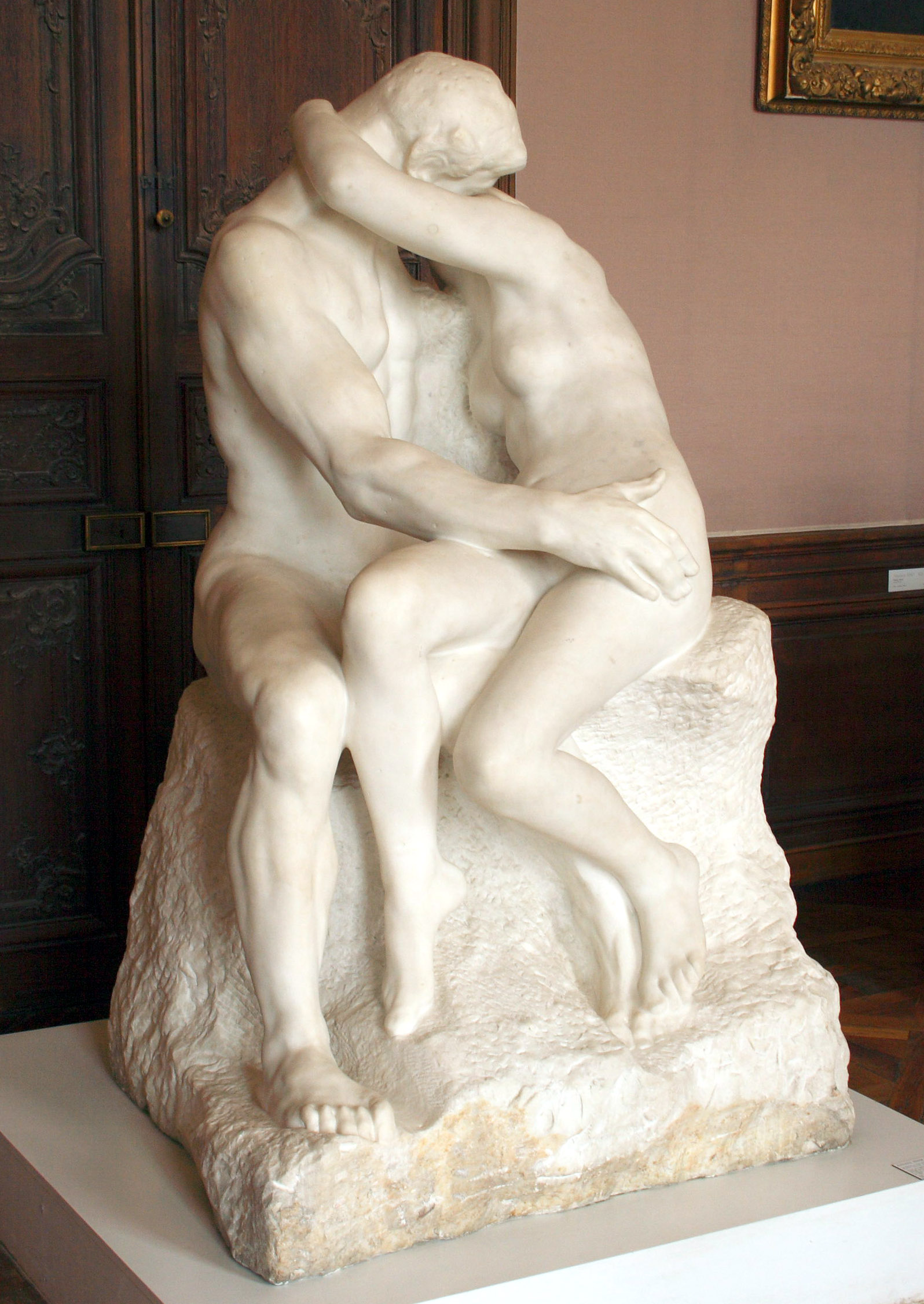
Le Baiser ("The Kiss")
by Auguste Rodin (1882)

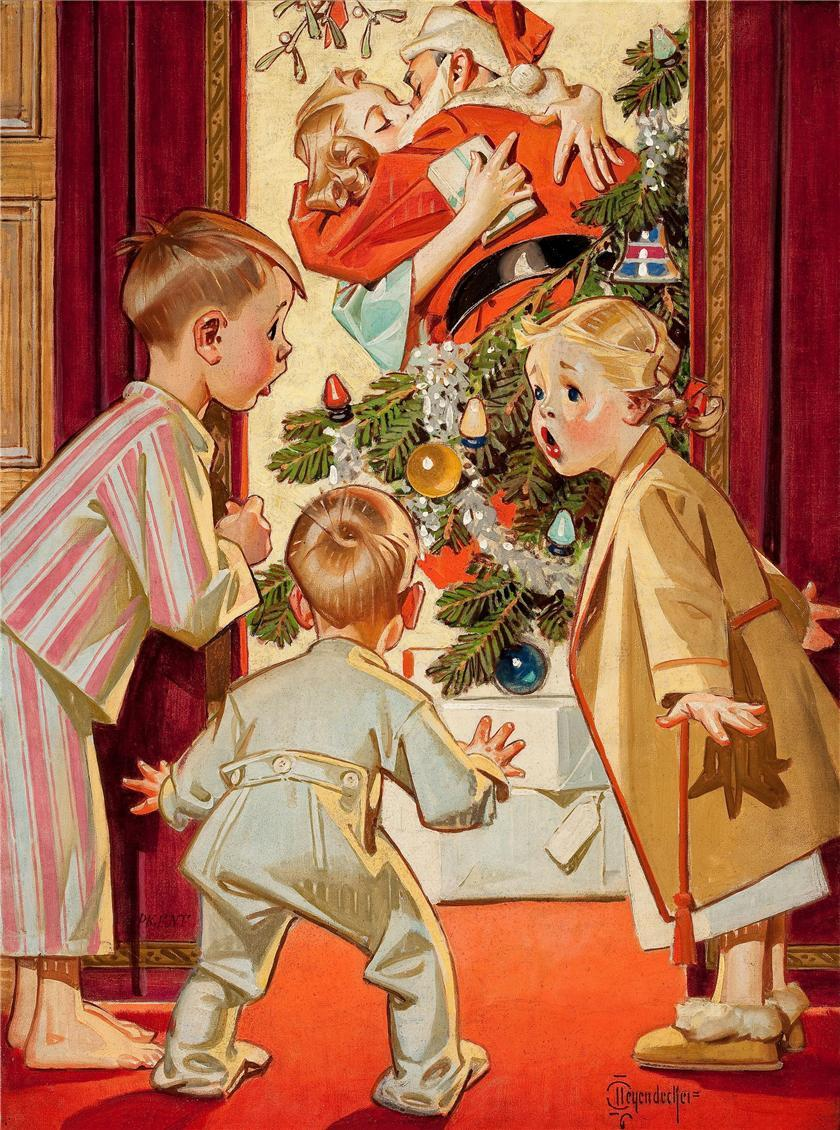
I Saw Mother Kissed Santa (1921) by J. C. Leyendecker

=== India ===
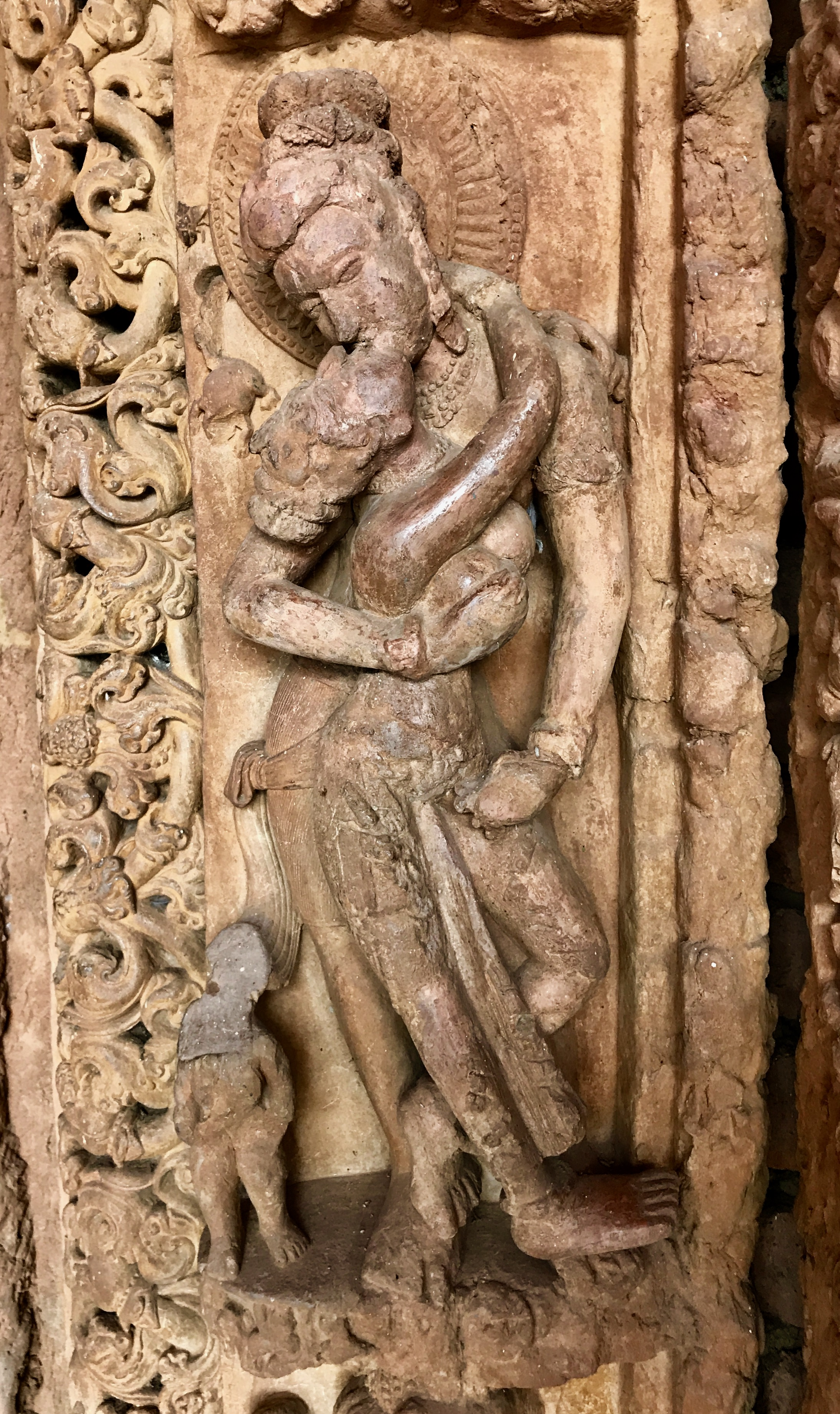
An 8th-century sculpture of a couple embraced and kissing at Tivara Deva temple, an excavated monument at Sirpur, Chhattisgarh, India

The Vedas, the oldest Hindu scripture dating back to 1500 B.C., contains one of the first descriptions of romantic kissing known. Ancient Hindu text Mahabharata also mentions kissing. The culture of kissing is believed to have originated and spread from ancient India. Despite this, romantic kissing in public is subject to moral, cultural, religious and political polarization in the modern day. On-screen lip-kissing was not a regular occurrence in Bollywood until the 1990s, although it has been present from the time of the inception of Bollywood.

Considered as 'corrupt western influence' and 'obscene act' by several religious and political organizations, it has been a subject of protests and even violent incidents. For example in October 2014, when JaiHind TV, an Indian National Congress-owned media, telecast an exclusive report on immoral activities in Kozhikode, Kerala featuring video of a couple kissing and hugging each other in a Downtown cafe, members identified as part of Bharatiya Janata Yuva Morcha, a youth wing of Bharatiya Janata Party, vandalized the cafe leading to 2014 Kiss of Love protest. Being organized 'informally' to kiss in a public place in response to increasing levels of 'moral policing', the protest saw opposition from the Kerala Police, with the Police Commissioner denying space to protest although noting that a formal request had not been made. In subsequent escalation of events, the Kerala Police was also criticized for detaining protesting members but allowing counter-protestors, that were also attacking the protestors and even threatening to strip them in public. Counter-protestors constituted of both Hindu and Muslim organizations, with Bharatiya Janata Yuva Morcha, Akhil Bharatiya Vidyarthi Parishad and Bajrang Dal being prominent Hindu organizations and Social Democratic Party of India and Sunni Yuvajana Samgam being prominent Islamic organizations that took part in the counter-protests. A similar protest planned in Bengaluru, Karnataka was denied permission to be held by Bengaluru Police stating that kissing is an obscene act although protest organized in Delhi outside Rashtriya Swayamsevak Sangh headquarters was conducted peacefully.

=== Middle East ===
There are also taboos as to whom one can kiss in some Muslim-majority societies governed by religious law. In the Islamic Republic of Iran, a man who kisses or touches a woman who is not his wife or relative can be punished such as getting whipped up to 100 times or go to jail.

Research from May 2023 found texts from ancient people in Mesopotamia that indicates that kissing was a well-established practice 4,500 years ago. According to Dr Troels Pank Arbøll, one of the authors of this study:

"In ancient Mesopotamia, which is the name for the early human cultures that existed between the Euphrates and Tigris rivers in present-day Iraq and Syria, people wrote in cuneiform script on clay tablets. Many thousands of these clay tablets have survived to this day, and they contain clear examples that kissing was considered a part of romantic intimacy in ancient times, just as kissing could be part of friendships and family members' relations."

=== East Asia ===
Donald Richie comments that in Japan, as in China, although kissing took place in erotic situations, in public "the kiss was invisible", and the "touching of the lips never became the culturally encoded action it has for so long been in Europe and America." The early Edison film, The Widow Jones – the May Irwin-John Rice Kiss (1896), created a sensation when it was shown in Tokyo, and people crowded to view the enormity. Likewise, Rodin's sculpture The Kiss was not displayed in Japan until after the Pacific War. Also, in the 1900s, Manchu tribes along the Amur River regarded public kissing between adults with revulsion. In a similar situation in Chinese tradition, when Chinese men saw Western women kissing men in public, they thought the women were prostitutes.

== Contemporary practices ==
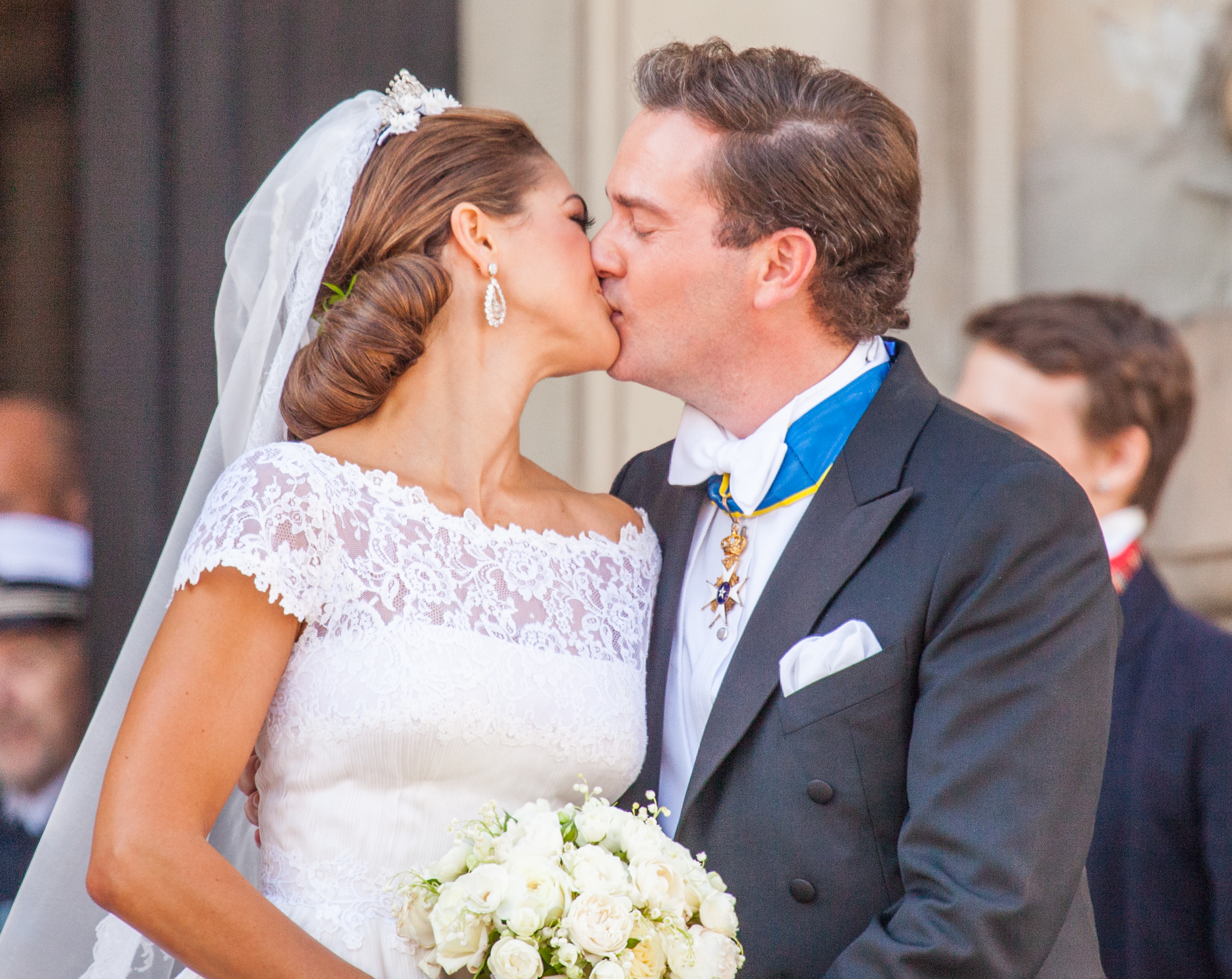
Princess Madeleine of Sweden and Christopher O'Neill kiss each other after their wedding, June 2013.

In modern Western culture, kissing on the lips is commonly an expression of romantic affection or a warm greeting. When lips are pressed together for an extended period, usually accompanied with an embrace, it is an expression of romantic and sexual desire. The practice of kissing with an open mouth, to allow the other to suck their lips or move their tongue into their mouth, is called French kissing. "Making out" is often an adolescent's first experience of their sexuality and games which involve kissing, such as spin the bottle, facilitate the experience. People may kiss children on the forehead to comfort them or the cheek or lips to show affection.

In modern Eastern culture, the etiquette vary depending on the region. In West Asia, kissing on the lips between both men and women is a common form of greeting. In South and Eastern Asia, it might often be a greeting between women, however, between men, it is unusual. Kissing a baby on the cheeks is a common form of affection. Most kisses between men and women are on the cheeks and not on the lips unless they are romantically involved. Sexual forms of kissing between lovers encompass the whole range of global practices.

=== Kissing in films ===
The first romantic kiss on screen was in American silent films in 1896, beginning with the film The Kiss. The kiss lasted 18 seconds and caused many to rail against decadence in the new medium of silent film. Writer Louis Black writes that "it was the United States that brought kissing out of the Dark Ages." However, it met with severe disapproval by defenders of public morality, especially in New York. One critic proclaimed that "it is absolutely disgusting. Such things call for police interference."

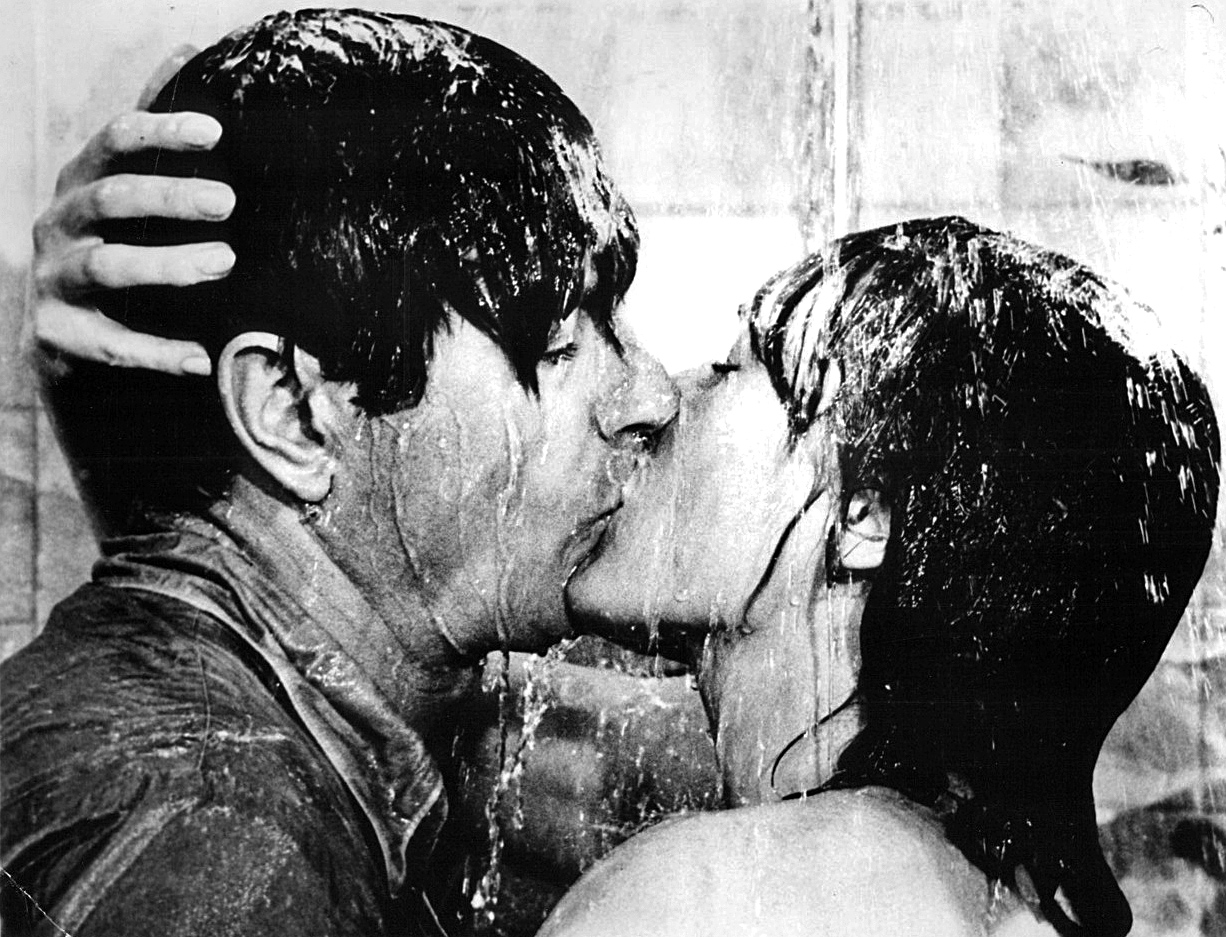
Rock Hudson and Julie Andrews kissing in film Darling Lili (1970)

Young moviegoers began emulating romantic stars on the screen, such as Ronald Colman and Rudolph Valentino, the latter known for ending his passionate scenes with a kiss. Valentino also began his romantic scenes with women by kissing her hand, traveling up her arm, and then kissing her on the back of her neck. Actresses were often turned into stars based on their screen portrayals of passion. Actresses like Nazimova, Pola Negri, Vilma Bánky and Greta Garbo, became screen idols as a result.

Eventually, the film industry began to adopt the dictates of the Production Code established in 1934, overseen by Will Hays and influenced by Christian religious leaders in America. According to the new code, "Excessive and lustful kissing, lustful embraces, suggestive postures and gestures, are not to be shown." As a result, kissing scenes were shortened, with scenes cut away, leaving the imagination of the viewer to take over. Under the code, actors kissing had to keep their feet on the ground and had to be either standing or sitting.

The heyday of romantic kissing on the screen took place in the early sound era, during the Golden Age of Hollywood in the 1930s and 1940s. Body language began to be used to supplement romantic scenes, especially with the eyes, a talent that added to Greta Garbo's fame. Author Lana Citron writes that "men were perceived as the kissers and women the receivers. Should the roles ever be reversed, women were regarded as vamps . . ." According to Citron, Mae West and Anna May Wong were the only Hollywood actresses never to have been kissed on screen. Among the films rated for having the most romantic kisses are Gone with the Wind, From Here to Eternity, Casablanca, and To Have and Have Not.

Sociologist Eva Illouz notes that surveys taken in 1935 showed that "love was the most important theme represented in movies. Similar surveys during the 1930s found the 95% of films had romance as one of their plot lines, what film critics called "the romantic formula."

In early Japanese films, kissing and sexual expression were controversial. In 1931, a director slipped a kissing scene past the censor (who was a friend), but when the film opened in a downtown Tokyo theater, the screening was stopped and the film confiscated. During the American occupation of Japan, in 1946, an American censor required a film to include a kissing scene. One scholar says that the censor suggested "we believe that even Japanese do something like kissing when they love each other. Why don't you include that in your films?" Americans encouraged such scenes to force the Japanese to express publicly actions and feelings that had been considered strictly private. Since Pearl Harbor, Americans had felt that the Japanese were "sneaky", claiming that "if Japanese kissed in private, they should do it in public too."

=== Non-sexual kisses ===
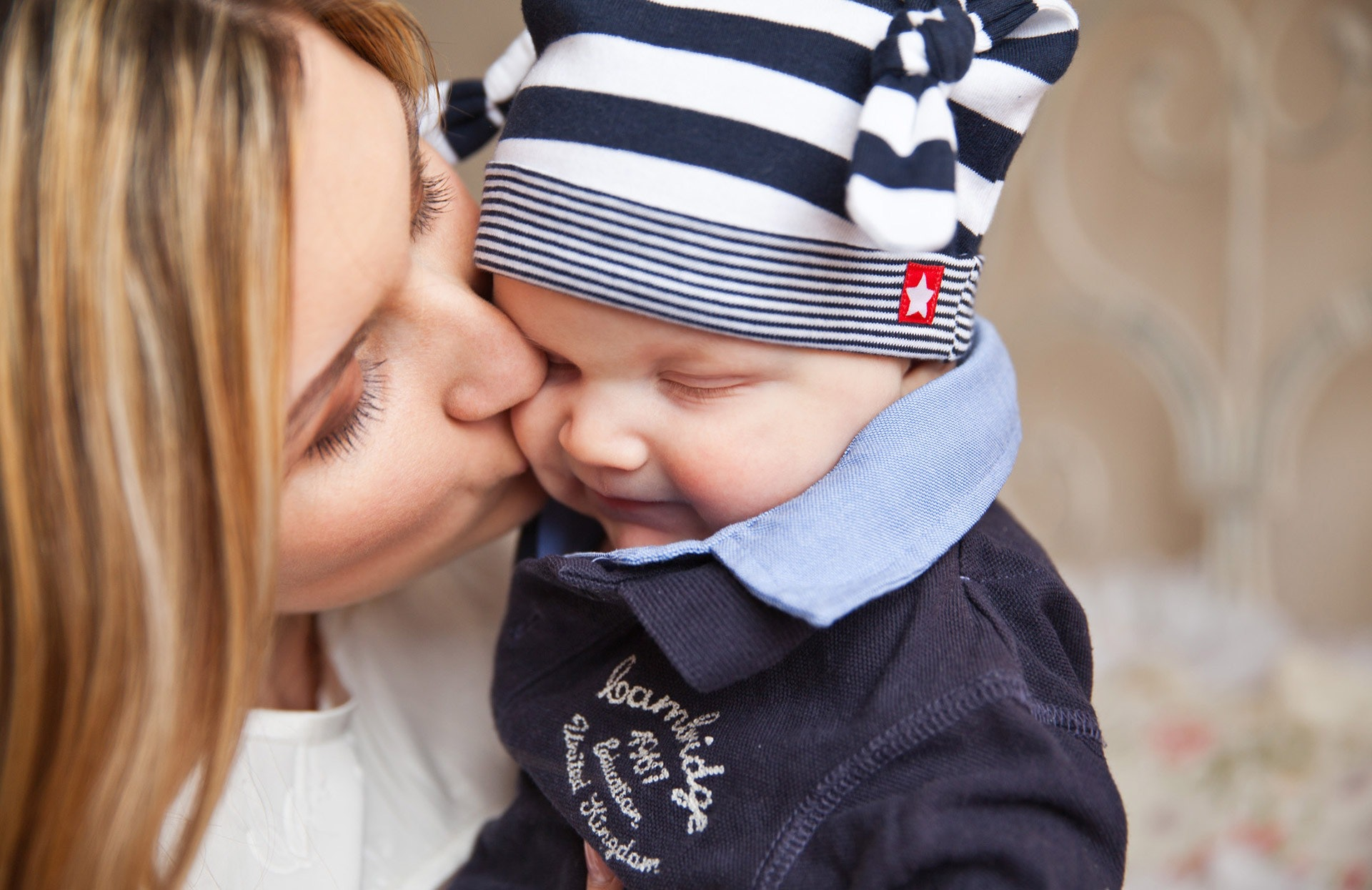
A mother kissing her child

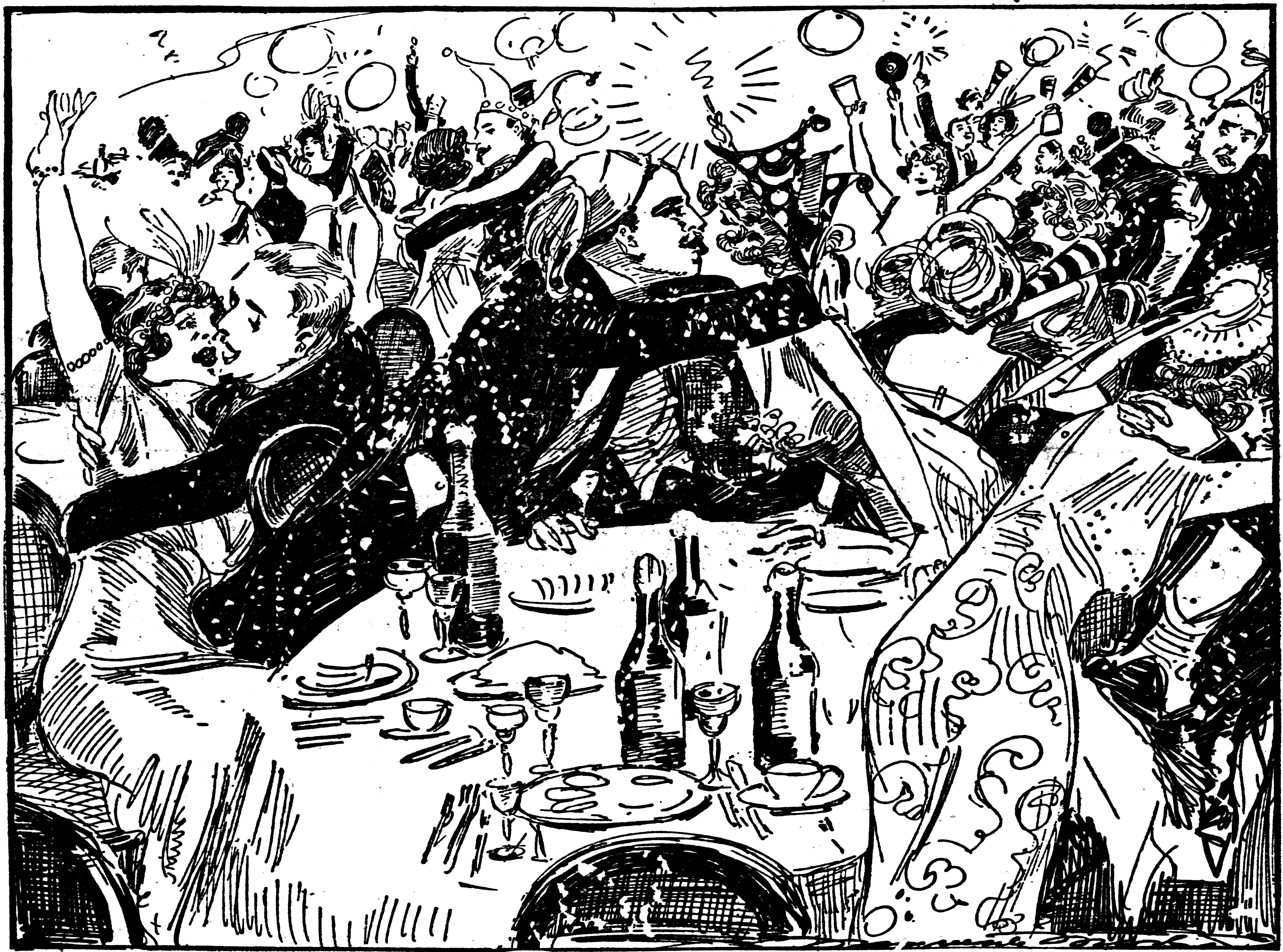
People kissing in this sketch by reporter and artist Marguerite Martyn of a New Year's Eve celebration in 1914

In some Western cultures, it is considered good luck to kiss someone on Christmas or on New Year's Eve, especially beneath a sprig of mistletoe. Newlyweds usually kiss at the end of a wedding ceremony.

Female friends and relations and close acquaintances commonly offer reciprocal kisses on the cheek as a greeting or farewell. Where cheek kissing is used, in some countries a single kiss is the custom, while in others a kiss on each cheek is the norm, or even three or four kisses on alternating cheeks. In the United States, an air kiss is becoming more common. This involves kissing in the air near the cheek, with the cheeks touching or not. After a first date, it is common for the couple to give each other a quick kiss on the cheek (or lips where that is the norm) on parting, to indicate that a good time was had and perhaps to indicate an interest in another meeting.

A symbolic kiss is frequent in Western cultures. A kiss can be "blown" to another by kissing the fingertips and then blowing the fingertips, pointing them in the direction of the recipient. This is used to convey affection, usually when parting or when the partners are physically distant but can view each other. Blown kisses are also used when a person wishes to convey affection to a large crowd or audience. The term flying kiss is used in India to describe a blown kiss. In written correspondence a kiss has been represented by the letter "X" since at least 1763. A stage or screen kiss may be performed by actually kissing, or faked by using the thumbs as a barrier for the lips and turning so the audience is unable to fully see the act.

Some literature suggests that a significant percentage of humanity does not kiss. It has been claimed that in Sub-Saharan African, Asiatic, Polynesian and possibly in some Native American cultures, kissing was relatively unimportant until European colonization. Historically however, the culture of kissing is thought to have begun and spread from the Eastern World, specifically India.

With the Andamanese, kissing was only used as a sign of affection towards children and had no sexual undertones.

In traditional Islamic cultures, kissing is not permitted between a man and woman who are not married or closely related by blood or marriage. A kiss on the cheek is a very common form of greeting among members of the same sex in most Islamic countries, much like the Southern European pattern.

== Legality of public kissing ==
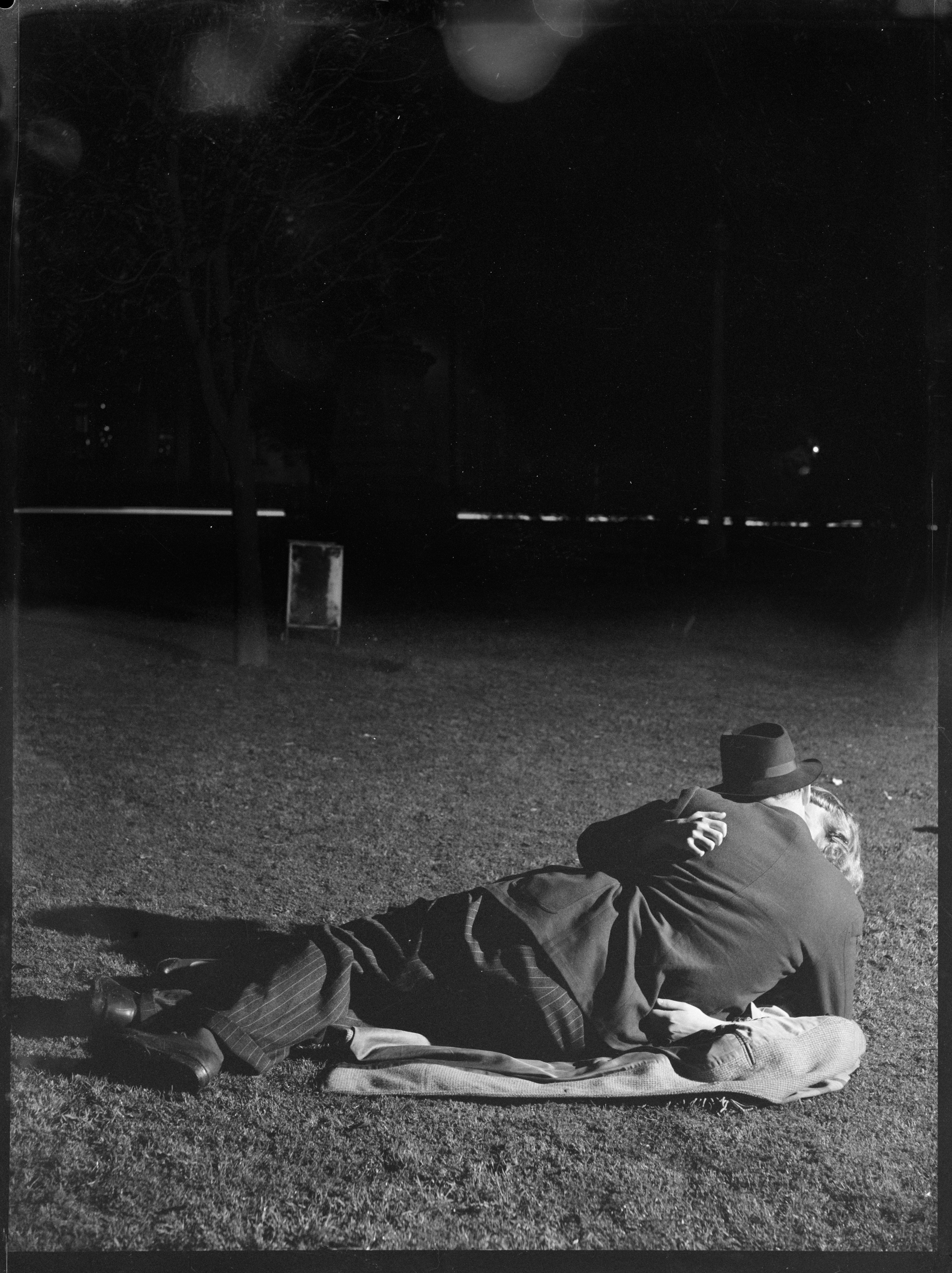
Couple Kissing, The Domain, Sydney, 1949

=== India ===
In India, public display of affection is a criminal offense under Section 294 of the Indian Penal Code, 1860, with a punishment of imprisonment of up to three months, or a fine, or both. This law was used by police to prosecute couples engaging in intimate acts, such as kissing in public and in some instances also milder expressions of love such as hugging or hand holding in public. Since the concerning sections of law leaves to the discretion of the courts in deciding what constitutes as indecent, despite assertions that kissing in public is not obscene in many landmark cases by the Supreme Court of India, it continues to be in use to rule against such cases. Due to ambiguity in the law concerning public display of affection, there are several instances of overreach of police authority in issuing complaint for milder expressions of romantic love like for example hand holding or hugging, as well as instances of interrogation for suspicion of "immoral activities".

In one such landmark case, for example, in 2007 when Richard Gere kissed Shilpa Shetty on her cheeks on a live broadcast as part of an AIDS awareness campaign, a complaint was registered against both the actors resulting in a local court issuing an arrest warrant for Gere which was cleared in 2008 by the Supreme Court of India, terming the ruling as 'cheap publicity' while the case involving the actress for 'failure to deny his advances' was dismissed in 2022, 15 years after the incident, with the court describing the actress as a "victim of unwanted advances".

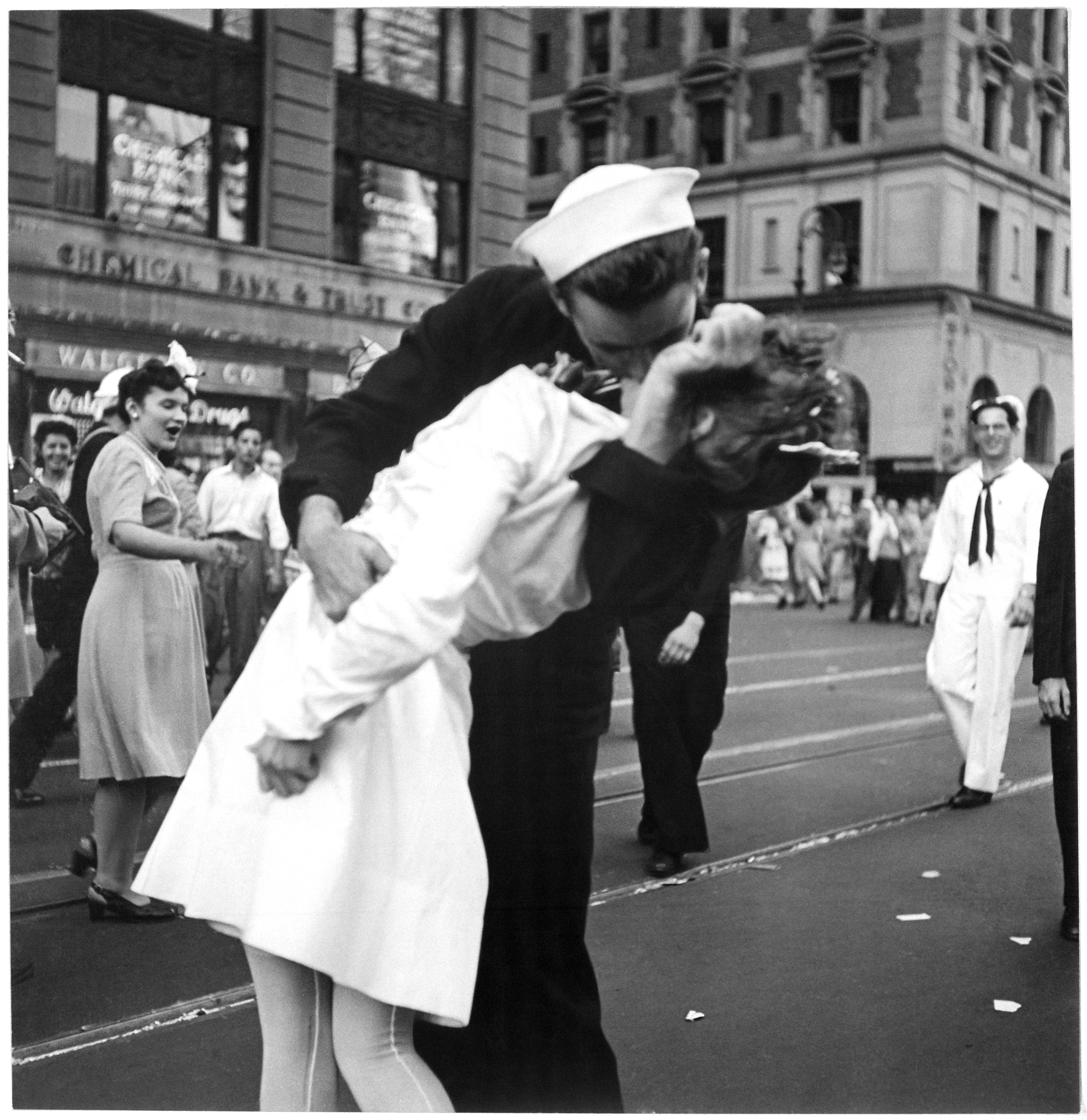
Captured by Victor Jorgensen, an alternate angle of V-J Day in Times Square depicting a U.S. Navy sailor kissing a total stranger in New York City's Times Square on V-J Day

=== Middle East ===
Most of the countries in this part of the world do not allow any kind of public displays of affection and penalties can be severe. In 2007, two people were fined and jailed for a month after kissing and hugging in public in Dubai, UAE.

== Legality of unwanted kissing ==
In New York in the United States, an unwanted kiss constitutes the sex offense of forcible touching. In Italy, the Supreme Court of Cassation has upheld sexual violence convictions for forced kisses. In Australia, unwanted kissing is sexual assault. In the Netherlands, forced-tongue-kissing was prosecuted as rape from 1998 until 2017, when the Dutch Supreme Court ruled that it should instead (while still deemed illegal) be viewed as a potential form of sexual assault, carrying a maximum eight-year prison sentence.

== In religion ==
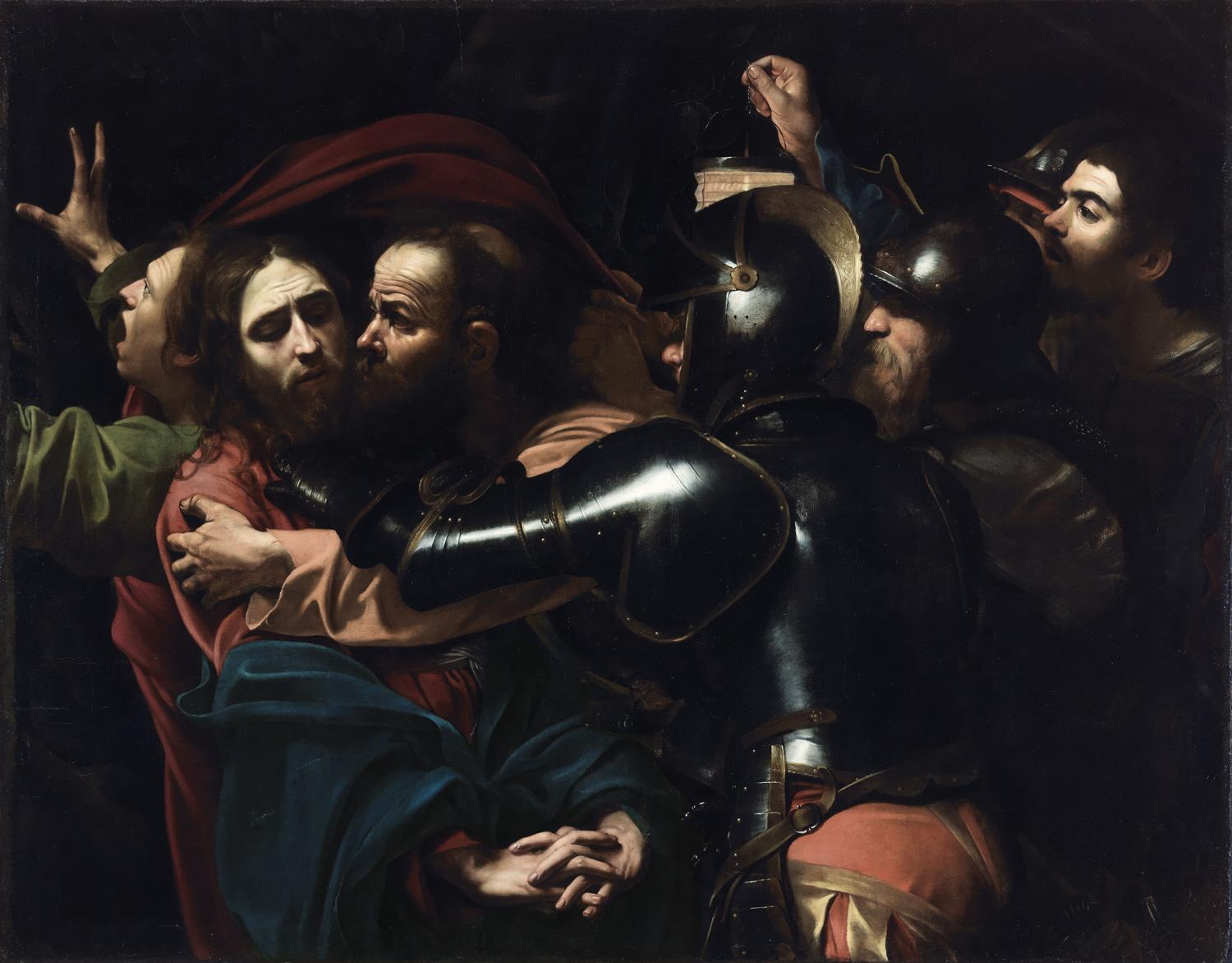
The Taking of Christ by Caravaggio (c. 1602) depicts Judas betraying Jesus with a kiss as a signal to arrest Jesus.

Kissing was a custom during the Biblical period mentioned in the Genesis 27:26, when Isaac kissed his son Jacob. The kiss is used in numerous other contexts in the Bible: the kiss of homage, in Esther 5:2; of subjection, in 1 Samuel 10:1; of reconciliation, in 2 Samuel 14:33; of valediction, in Ruth 1:14; of approbation, in Psalms 2:12; of humble gratitude, in Luke 7:38; of welcome, in Exodus 18:7; of love and joy, in Genesis 20:11. There are also spiritual kisses, as in Song of Songs 1:2; sensual kisses, as in Proverbs 7:13; and hypocritical kisses, as in 2 Samuel 15:5. It was customary to kiss the mouth in biblical times, and also the beard, which is still practiced in Arab culture. Kissing the hand is not biblical, according to Tabor. The kiss of peace was an apostolic custom, and continues to be one of the rites in the Eucharistic services of Roman Catholics.

In the Roman Catholic Order of Mass, the bishop or priest celebrant bows and kisses the altar, reverencing it, upon arriving at the altar during the entrance procession before Mass and upon leaving at the recessional at the closing of Mass; if a deacon is assisting, he bows low before the altar but does not kiss it.

Among primitive cultures, it was usual to throw kisses to the sun and to the moon, as well as to the images of the gods. Kissing the hand is first heard of among the Persians. According to Tabor, the kiss of homage—the character of which is not indicated in the Bible—was probably upon the forehead, and was expressive of high respect.

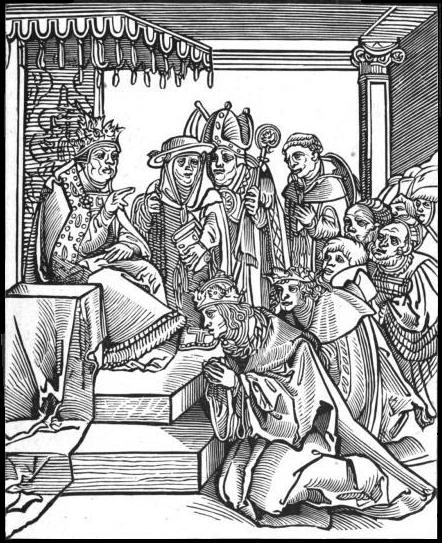
This woodcut of the practice of kissing the pope's toe is from Passionary of the Christ and Antichrist by Lucas Cranach the Elder.

- In Ancient Rome and some modern Pagan beliefs, worshipers, when passing the statue or image of a god or goddess, will kiss their hand and wave it towards the deity (adoration).
- The holy kiss or kiss of peace is a traditional part of most Christian liturgies, though often replaced with an embrace or handshake today in Western cultures.
- In the gospels of Matthew and Mark (Luke and John omit this), Judas betrayed Jesus with a kiss: an instance of a kiss tainted with betrayal. This is the basis of the term "the kiss of Judas".
- Catholics will kiss rosary beads as a part of prayer, or kiss their hand after making the sign of the cross. It is also common to kiss the wounds on a crucifix, or any other image of Christ's Passion.
  - Pope John Paul II would kiss the ground on arrival in a new country.
  - Visitors to the pope traditionally kiss his foot.
  - Catholics traditionally kiss the ring of a cardinal or bishop.
  - Catholics traditionally kiss the hand of a priest.
- Eastern Orthodox and Eastern Catholic Christians often kiss the icons around the church on entering; they will also kiss the cross and/or the priest's hand in certain other customs in the church, such as confession or receiving a blessing.
- Local lore in Ireland suggests that kissing the Blarney Stone will bring the gift of the gab.
- Jews will kiss the Western Wall of the Holy Temple in Jerusalem, and other religious articles during prayer such as the Torah, usually by touching their hand, Tallis, or Siddur (prayerbook) to the Torah and then kissing it. Jewish law prohibits kissing members of the opposite sex, except for spouses and certain close relatives. See Negiah.

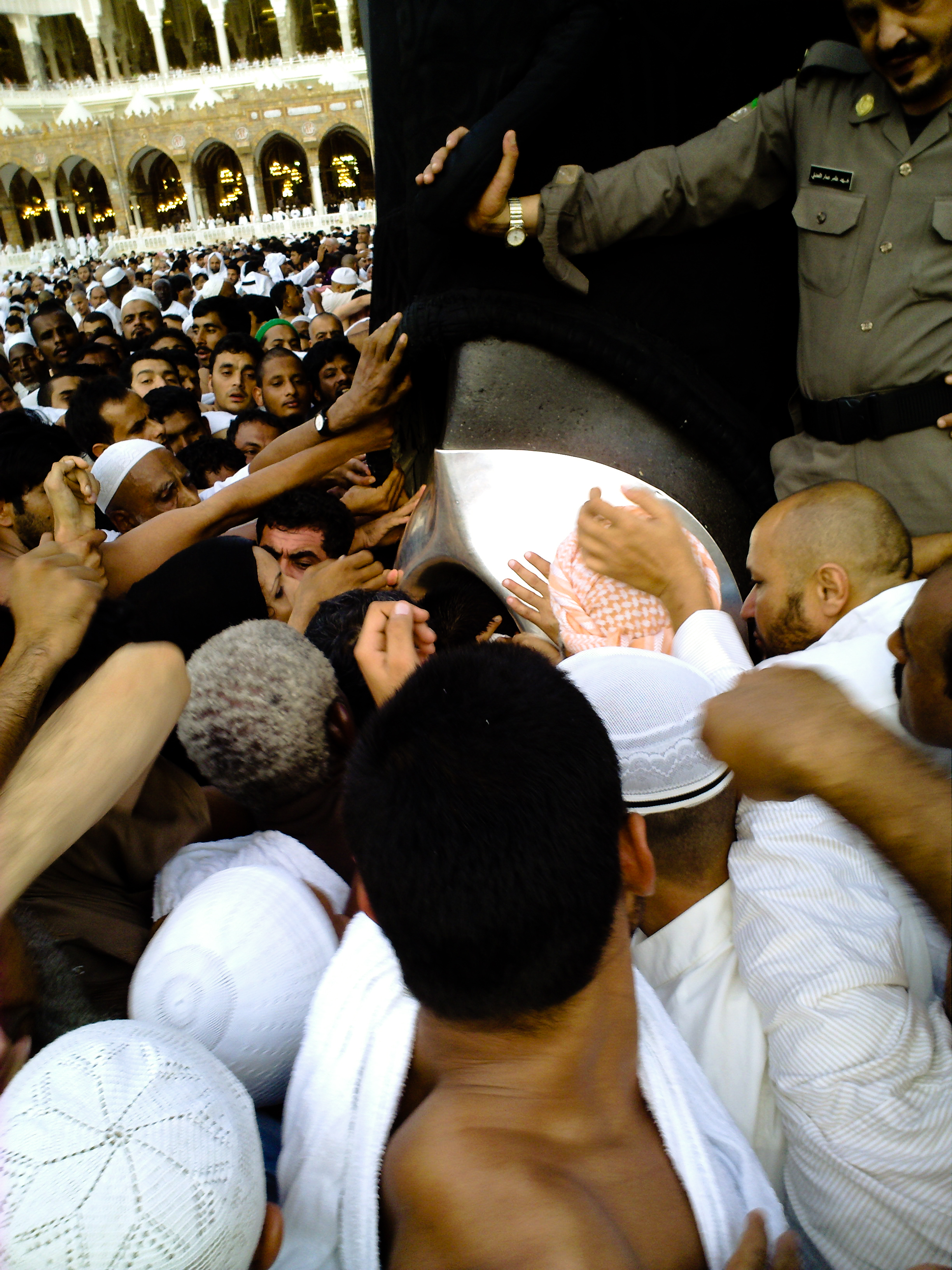
Pilgrims jostle for a chance to kiss the Black Stone, and if they cannot kiss it, they can point to it at each circuit with their right hand.

- Muslims may kiss the Black Stone during Hajj (pilgrimage to Mecca). Many Muslims also kiss shrines of Ahlulbayt and Sufis.

== Biology and evolution ==
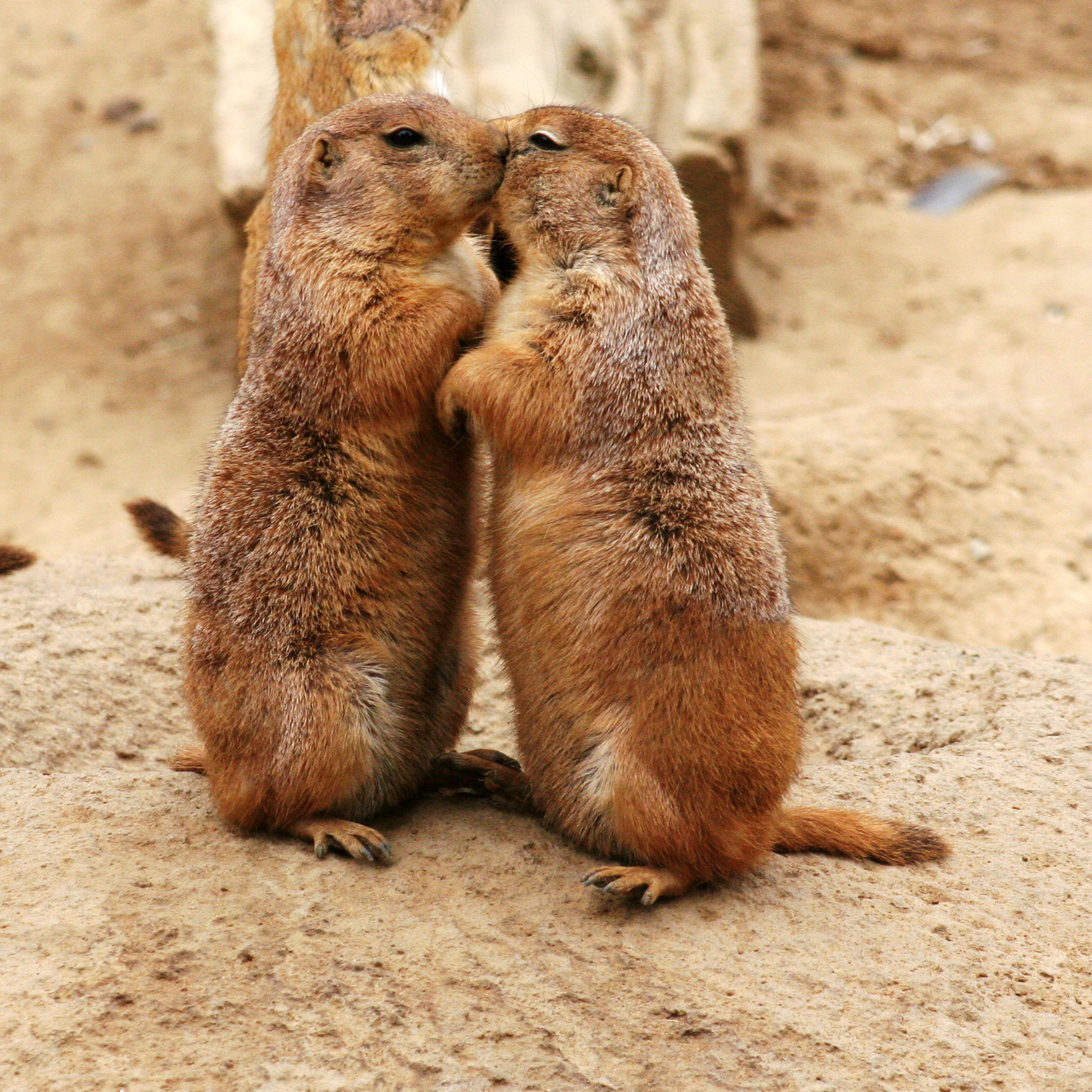
Black-tailed prairie dogs "kissing." Prairie dogs use a nuzzle of this variety to greet their relatives.

Within the natural world of other animals, there are numerous analogies to kissing, notes Crawley, such as "the billing of birds, the cataglottism of pigeons and the antennal play of some insects." Even among mammals such as the dog, cat and bear, similar behavior is noted.

Anthropologists have not reached a conclusion as to whether kissing is learned or a behavior from instinct. It may be related to grooming behavior also seen between other animals, or arising as a result of mothers premasticating food for their children. Non-human primates also exhibit kissing behavior. Dogs, cats, birds and other animals display licking, nuzzling, and grooming behavior among themselves, and also towards humans or other species. This is sometimes interpreted by observers as a type of kissing.

Kissing in humans was argued by ethologist Eibl-Eibesfeldt to have evolved from the direct mouth-to-mouth regurgitation of food (kiss-feeding) from parent to offspring or male to female (courtship feeding) and has been observed in numerous mammals. The similarity in the methods between kiss-feeding and deep human kisses (e.g. French kiss) is quite pronounced; in the former, the tongue is used to push food from the mouth of the mother to the child with the child receiving both the mother's food and tongue in sucking movements, and the latter is the same but forgoes the premasticated food. In fact, through observations across various species and cultures, it can be confirmed that the act of kissing and premastication has most likely evolved from the similar relationship-based feeding behaviours.

A 2024 article advanced the hypothesis that the practice of human kissing may have evolved from the final stage of grooming in non-human primates, representing a vestigial form of lip contact that has retained its ancestral social function of strengthening bonds of affiliation and kinship.

A 2025 study published in Evolution and Human Behavior found evidence that kissing first occurred in human ancestors between 21.5–16.9 million years ago.

=== Physiology ===
Kissing is a complex behavior that requires significant muscular coordination involving a total of 34 facial muscles and 112 postural muscles. The most important muscle involved is the orbicularis oris muscle, which is used to pucker the lips and informally known as the kissing muscle. In the case of the French kiss, the tongue is also an important component. Lips have many nerve endings which make them sensitive to touch and bite.

=== Neurological effects ===
Kissing stimulates the production of hormones responsible for a good mood: oxytocin, which releases the feeling of love and strengthens the bond with the partner; endorphins, hormones responsible for the feeling of happiness; and dopamine, which stimulates the pleasure center in the brain. Affection in general has stress-reducing effects. Kissing in particular has been studied in a controlled experiment and it was found that increasing the frequency of kissing in marital and cohabiting relationships results in a reduction of perceived stress, an increase in relationship satisfaction, and a lowering of cholesterol levels.

=== Disease transmission ===
Kissing on the lips can result in the transmission of some diseases, including infectious mononucleosis (known as the "kissing disease") and herpes simplex when the infectious viruses are present in saliva. Research indicates that contraction of HIV via kissing is extremely unlikely, although there was a documented case in 1997 of an HIV infection by kissing. Both the woman and infected man had gum disease, so transmission was through the man's blood, not through saliva.

== See also ==
- Eskimo kissing
- Hand-kissing
- Holy kiss
- Hugs and kisses
- International Kissing Day
- Kissing games
- Kissing traditions
- Kissing booth
- Socialist fraternal kiss
