= Valentine's Day in India =

14 February

The celebration of Valentine's Day in India began to become popular following the economic liberalisation. There have been protests against the celebrations by groups who consider it a Western influence. The groups who disrupt Valentine's Day celebrations have been described as Hindu hardliners, extremists & militants. Almost every year, law and order problems occur on 14 February in many cities in India due to mobocracy and protests.

== Overview ==
In the Medieval era, the acceptance of public affection died off. Lovers from different castes have been prosecuted and even sometimes there have been honour killings. Public display of affection such as kissing is considered sometimes unacceptable today in India.

Following the economic liberalisation in the early 1990s, a new middle class emerged who could afford access to foreign TV channels and card shops. Valentine's Day became popular among this middle class, but not much in the lower economics classes. Many young and working Indians live away from their families. This gives, especially women, a choice in their relationships. The interest in dating sites has also increased. Commercial establishments have attempted to cash in on this new sub-culture.

Unrequited love is sometimes met with harassment, which is known by the euphemism "eve-teasing"; and occasionally it becomes more violent. There have also been acid attacks.

== Criticism and protests ==
Various political parties have condemned Valentine's Day as an unwelcome influence of Western culture on India. Some also consider this a scam by corporations for their economic gain.

Shiv Sena leader Uddhav Thackeray has called it an attack of the west on Indian culture and that it is attracting youth for commercial gain. Shiv Sena leader Bal Thackeray has said that people not wanting violence on the day should not celebrate it. He has also called the festival shameless and contrary to Indian culture. In Maharashtra, the Shiv Sena often threatens commercial establishments to stop selling goods that celebrate Valentine's Day. The Mumbai city unit chief Nana Wadekar of Shiv Sena has stated that Valentine's Day encourages obscene and vulgar acts.

Sri Ram Sena leader Pramod Muthalik has said that if his activists catch couples in public on Valentine's Day, they would be forcibly married. If the couples resist, then the girl with will be forced to tied rakhi to the boy, a ritual which would make them siblings.

Other political parties and religious groups who have been known to protest Valentine's Day are, Vishwa Hindu Parishad, Bajrang Dal, Akhil Bharatiya Vidyarthi Parishad, Sri Ram Sena, Students Islamic Organisation of India, Hindu Munnani, Hindu Makkal Katchi, etc.

Activists have been known to raid card shops and burn Valentine's Day cards and flowers. Members of Vishwa Hindu Parishad and Bajrang Dal have also been known to throw rotten tomatoes at couples. There also have been reports of people attacking restaurants. Bajrang Dal has been known to put up billboards warning couples to not hold hands. Shiv Sena has warned that people expressing love in public will be photographed and the photographs will be sent to their families. Couples roaming in public parks are sometimes caught by vigilantes and their hair is cut off and their faces are painted black to humiliate them. Some groups conduct marriages of different animals like goat and dog, or dog and horse, to symbolise that the love displayed on this day is fake.

Between February 3 and 15, 2010, Pune police proscribed "gathering in groups and disturbing peace, playing drums or any other music systems loudly, showing of affection in ways that tantamount to obscenity, throwing colours under influence of alcohol, disturbing peace in public places and obstructing traffic, doing vulgar acts in schools, colleges and encouraging anti-social activities" to be under Section 144 of the CrPC (unlawful assembly) in all public and private places under the jurisdiction of the Pune police commissioner. They declared that those found violating the order would be punished under Section 188 (disobedience to order duly promulgated by public servant) of the IPC.

In February 2015, Chandra Prakash Kaushik of Hindu Mahasabha said that anyone found celebrating in public places, like malls and restaurants, in the week around Valentine's Day will be forcibly married. If one of them is non-Hindu, he/she will be converted to Hinduism before marriage. They also said that a social media team will be monitoring Facebook, WhatsApp and Twitter, anyone showing love online will also be married off.

=== Parents Worship Day ===
In 2007, spiritual leader and convicted rapist Asaram started Parent’s Worship Day as an alternative to celebrating February 14 as Valentine’s Day. He said instead of protesting against Valentine's Day and causing law and order problems, youth should be given an alternative.

In 2015, the state of Chhattisgarh officially declared 14 February every year to be Parents' Day or Matru-Pitru Divas. It had started observing it in 2008 on the advice of Asaram. In 2013 and 2014, separate circulars were issued with instructions. On this day, parents are invited to school and students pray to them.

== Support and counter protests ==
In January 2009, a pub was attacked in Mangalore by members of a group called Sri Ram Sena. Following which, the group's leader Pramod Muthalik announced that his organisation would also protest Valentine's Day. A group called "Consortium of Pub-going, Loose and Forward Women" was formed on Facebook and it asked people to mail pink underwear to Muthalik. The protest was named Pink Chaddi Campaign. About, 34,000 people participated.

In Tamil Nadu, Dravidar Viduthalai Kazhagam, Thanthai Periyar Dravidar Kazhagam and Democratic Youth Federation of India support the festival. On this day, Thanthai Periyar Dravidar Kazhagam has performed inter caste marriages and Democratic Youth Federation of India has felicitated those who have entered an inter-caste marriage.

On 14 February 2015, in response to Hindu Mahasabha's announcement to marry off couples found celebrating, several students of Jawaharlal Nehru University and Delhi University protested on the Mandir Marg, New Delhi, near the Hindu Mahasabha office. Many were dressed in wedding dresses and they were accompanied by a wedding band. About 220 students were arrested by the police when they began marching towards the Hindu Mahasabha office, as they had not taken permission for the protest.

The Animal Welfare Board of India announced that from 2023 onwards, February 14 will be celebrated as "Cow Hug Day"saying that "All cow lovers may celebrate February 14 as Cow Hug Day keeping in mind the importance of mother cow and make life happy and full of positive energy," read the notice issued by the board under the Department of Animal Husbandry and Dairying. The notice also said hugging cows will bring "emotional richness" and increase "individual and collective happiness". According to an article in CNN "But the move appears to have backfired and been abandoned after it prompted a flood of internet memes, cartoons and jokes by TV hosts about the importance of consent". The suggestion to hug a cow on Valentine's Day has been retracted.

== See also ==
- Christianity in India
- Moral police
- Love Jihad
- Valentine's Day in Pakistan
- Valentine's Day in Iran
- Valentine's Day in Bangladesh
