= Moral police =

Category of vigilante groups which act to enforce a code of morality in India

Moral police is an umbrella category of vigilante groups which act to enforce a code of morality in India. Some of India's laws, and some actions of police forces in India are also considered to be instances of moral policing. The target of moral policing is any activity that vigilante groups, the government or police deem to be "immoral" and/or "against Indian culture".

== Laws ==
In India, the Sections 292 to 294 of the Indian Penal Code are used to deal with obscenity. Most of these laws date back to 1860. The Section 292 of the Indian Penal Code deals with sales and distribution of obscene books and other material. It criminalises materials like books and paintings if it is deemed to be "lascivious or appeals to the prurient interest". The Section 292 was amended in 1969 to exclude material that are for public good (like condom ads), scientific material, art and religious figures. Police also use Section 292 of the IPC to file cases against film posters and advertisement hoardings that are deemed to be "obscene".

The Section 293 deals with the sale of obscene material to people under 20. The Section 294 of the Indian Penal Code deals with "obscene acts and songs" and it states that:

Whoever, to the annoyance of others

(a) Does any obscene act in any public place, or
(b) Sings, recites or utters any obscene song, ballad or words, in or near any public place,

Shall be punished with imprisonment of either description for a term which may extend to three months, or with fine, or with both.

There is no proper definition of an obscene act and it is open to interpretation. It is frequently used by the police to justify acts of moral policing.

Immoral Traffic (Prevention) Act, 1956 (also known as Prevention of Immoral Traffic Act or PITA) was originally passed to prevent human trafficking. It allows police to raid hotels if they suspect a sex racket is being run there. Police have used this law to raid hotels and arrest consenting couples.

India's obscenity laws have also been frequently compared to the Hicklin test. Despite demands to criminalize moral policing, advisories issued against it in various courts including the Supreme Court, and policies against it followed by certain departments, there are no laws, due to which such incidents continue to happen.

== Forms of moral policing ==
=== Vigilante activities ===
Moral policing by vigilante groups, various organizations and mobs in India is a common occurrence. Motives for such incidents are protection of religious or cultural identity and imposition of personal views and moral codes on everyone involving, for example, religious views, objection to inter-faith or inter-caste relationships, cohabitation or live-in relationships, views on women, views on gambling, views on alcoholism, and public display of affection between consenting adults or for preservation of conservative views in relation to Indian culture. Often these views and sentiments are heavily politicized, and is sometimes also reflected in laws and also gains support from officials ranging from police officers to judges. Religious heads and organizations sometimes issue statements ordering compliance with moral code in reference to their religion, excommunication or even support for violence against offenders. Individuals and organizations sometimes pursue legal actions against offending people and organize protests with many instances turning to violence. Politicians are criticized for supporting or spreading inflammatory rhetoric surrounding topics such as for the ruling BJP, regarding Cow vigilantism violence over rumors of selling, buying or killing of cows for beef which is illegal in certain parts of India, or Love Jihad Islamophobic conspiracy theory promoted by Hindutva activists alleging conversion of women to Islam through marriage that has consequently been the cause of vigilante assaults, murders and other violent incidents involving consenting adults, including riots such as the 2013 Muzaffarnagar riots.

==== Valentine's Day ====
Valentine's Day is often notably opposed through violent means by Hindutva militant groups like Shiv Sena, Sri Ram Sena, and Sangh Parivar organizations such as Vishwa Hindu Parishad, Bajrang Dal, Akhil Bharatiya Vidyarthi Parishad, Hindu Munnani, also political organizations like Hindu Makkal Katchi and organizations with political affiliation such as Shiv Sena affiliated Bharatiya Kamgar or CPI-M affiliated Students' Federation of India. Couples are often beaten up for holding hands or kissing in public. Vigilante groups have been known to attack gift and greeting card shops prior on the occasion. Events organized in recognition of Valentine's Day are often vandalized by mobs organized through such groups. Couples are secretly videographed to be shared online or threatened with as intimidation or pursuing police complaint under the country's public display of affection law. Conservative Islamic organizations such as Students Islamic Organisation of India, Dukhtaran-e-Millat, Raza Academy and Girls Islamic Organisation are known for staging protests and calling for boycott of the date. Leaders of such organizations hold the position that it an attack of the west on Indian culture and that it is attracting youth for commercial gain. Occasionally, the police also try to restrict these groups although such groups remain to be active.

=== Police overreach ===
Police authorities often take actions permitted through vague and unclear laws to file complaints against individuals or even organizations for various 'immoral' activities. For example, kissing, hugging or even holding hands in public have been subject to complaint as public display of affection is a punishable offense with maximum 3 months imprisonment and/or fine under section 292 and section 294 of Bharatiya Nyaya Sanhita which does not define but rather leaves to the discretion of the courts to decide what constitutes as an offending action. Politicians cite Information Technology (IT) Act to call for monitoring and blocking of social media for 'vulgar' content under cyber wing of police departments due to the power it grants as well as its unclear definitions, having the potential to emerge as new methods for censorship. Despite the repeal of section 66A of the Act in 2015 by the Supreme Court, most police departments continued to use it. Following increasing incidents of moral policing involving police officers, the Supreme Court of India issued an advisory against indulging in any kind of moral policing by police officers in December 2022. Eloping couples sometimes have missing persons complaint filed by their parents in some cases leading to harassment by the police, which has resulted in guidelines issued by court to police departments in an attempt to curb this. Prevention of Immoral Traffic Act, or laws against indecent behavior in public, are sometimes cited for raiding hotels providing private space for consenting couples, as per department policy which varies across police departments. "Operation Majnu" achieved significant notoriety in public discourse on moral policing, for incidents in Meerut and Ghaziabad, where couples sitting in public parks were interrogated and punished with sit-ups by police officers accompanied by a TV crew claiming to "check sexual harassment" and "to prevent innocent girls being trapped by boys with evil motives".

==== Anti-Romeo squads ====
During 2017 election cycle in Uttar Pradesh, the BJP promised to form 'anti-Romeo squads' with plain clothes officers stationed near universities to check crime against women in its manifesto. Within days of assuming the role of the Chief Minister of Uttar Pradesh in 2017, Yogi Adityanath, enforced 'anti-Romeo squad' in the police department for safety of women and young girls from sexual harassment, indecent behavior and eve-teasing. Its officers were tasked with patrolling universities, cinema halls, parks and other public places in plain clothes. The initiative does not clearly define the term 'Romeo' in its manifesto, leading to broad interpretation by police officers and harassment of couples in consensual relationships, as well as extortion. Reports emerged of overreach involving on-spot enforcement of punishments for boys consisting of sit-ups, murga punishment and also tonsure before changing its policy, due to which it attracted criticism by various media including international media, for overreach of authority. Lucknow high court squashed a PIL alleging that officers were not following guidelines and Allahabad High court denied overreach of authority and called the move as constitutional, terming it as preventive policing. From March 2017 to February 2025, the anti-romeo squad has checked over 40 million persons and registered 24 thousand cases against 30 thousand individuals, while it registered 6 cases a day at a period. Gujarat has also experimented with 'anti-Romeo' squads, with undercover police officers attending festivities to catch eve-teasers, 'Romeos' and also 'Juliets' however, its effectiveness has been debated.

In March 2025, shortly following the election of BJP led government in Delhi, it announced the formation of 'Shishtachar' which is said to function similarly to anti-Romeo squads in Uttar Pradesh, within the Delhi police. However, the department operates on strict instructions against imposing morals and ethics on the public and to only focus on women's safety, and is subject to regular reviews to prevent misuse. The initiative has also been received positively.

=== Judiciary actions ===
==== Restrictions on night life and alcohol ====
Throughout India, restrictions have been place by some state governments on timings and license requirement for pubs, bars and other establishments that sell liquor. State specific laws govern legal drinking age in India. Various states also impose bans on dance bars such as Maharashtra and Karnataka.

==== Opposition to sex education in schools ====
The Adolescence Education Programme (AEP) was a sex education program designed by the Ministry of Human Resource Development (India) and National AIDS Control Organisation (NACO) to implement the policies of the National AIDS Control Programme II (NACP II). However, it faced opposition in various states, including Gujarat, Madhya Pradesh, Maharashtra, Karnataka, and Rajasthan.

==== Obscenity cases ====
Various cases of obscenity have been filed against notable film directors, actors, actresses, models and personalities for their work, as well as against works of art, books and media. Shilpa Shetty and Richard Gere kissing incident is a landmark case of public obscenity charges against a public personality. In 2007, when Richard Gere kissed Shilpa Shetty on her cheeks on a live broadcast as part of an AIDS awareness campaign, a complaint was registered against both the actors resulting in a local court issuing an arrest warrant for Richard Gere which was cleared in 2008 by the Supreme Court of India terming the ruling as 'cheap publicity' while the case involving the actress for 'failure to deny his advances' was dismissed in 2022, 15 years after the incident, with the court describing the actress as a "victim of unwanted advances". Since the concerning sections of law leaves to the discretion of the courts in deciding what constitutes as indecent, despite assertions that kissing in public is not obscene in many such landmark cases by the Supreme Court of India, it continues to be in use to rule against such cases. India's Got Latent was under controversy in 2025, for an obscene joke by a guest member, resulting in threats for all of the cast members, temporary arrests, and a Supreme Court hearing that recommended drafting regulations for online content which is criticized for propagation of moral panic and tightening of internet censorship in India.

A list of notable film directors, actors, actresses and models who have been subject to obscenity cases for their work includes Milind Soman, Madhu Sapre, Pooja Bhatt, Madhuri Dixit, Mamta Kulkarni, Karisma Kapoor, Tabassum Hashmi, Raveena Tandon, Juhi Chawla, Mamta Kulkarni, Reema Sen, Aishwarya Rai, Hrithik Roshan, Akshay Kumar, Twinkle Khanna, Vidya Balan, Karan Johar, Arjun Kapoor, Ranveer Singh and Deepika Padukone.

=== Censorship ===
In India, there are various restrictions on content, with an official view towards "maintaining communal and religious harmony" which sometimes leans towards moral policing. The Central Board of Film Certification (CBFC) or the Censor Board, is tasked with regulating the public exhibition of films under the provisions of the "Cinematograph Act, 1952", which has been accused of moral policing by filmmakers on multiple occasions and has been criticized for erring caution to protests by moral police, although the former chief of the Censor Board, Sharmila Tagore, has defended the body against such claims. Filmmakers have reported a more positive experience with the board's Film Certification Appellate Tribunal (FCAT) where filmmakers can appeal decisions of the censor board in front of a judiciary panel. The FCAT had been historically more progressive than CBFC and responsible to overtuning CBFC decisions on many occasions, including Bandit Queen (1994) that concluded through a landmark supreme court ruling and Lipstick Under My Burkha (2016). India's Cable Television Networks regulation act and Cable Television rules allow authorities to take offending channels off air. It was abolished in 2021 under the Tribunal Reforms Ordinance, 2021.

=== Other ===
- Some colleges and universities enforce a dress code on their students, usually restricting girls from wearing Western clothing. The rationale behind such restriction is provided that such clothes "attract eve-teasing".
- Some home owners and related associations, are biased against single tenants and sometimes enforce restrictions such as no late-night entry, no visit by the opposite sex in the residence, no smoking or drinking, and sometimes even prohibit consumption of non-vegetarian food in the residence due to religious views against it.

== Protests ==
- 2009 Mangalore pub attack: On 24 January 2009, members of the Sri Ram Sena barged into the pub "Amnesia – The Lounge" in Mangalore, Karnataka, and beat up a group of young women and men, claiming the women should not be drinking in a public place. An organisation called "Consortium of Pubgoing, Loose forward Women" started a movement called the "Pink chaddi campaign". The movement requested people to mail pink underwear to Pramod Muthalik the leader of Sri Ram Sena which was behind the attacks. About 34,000 people participated.
- Kiss of Love protests: On 23 October 2014, a restaurant in Kozhikode was attacked and vandalised by members identified as part of Bharatiya Janata Yuva Morcha, a youth wing of Bharatiya Janata Party. The attackers claimed that eatery was facilitating immoral activities. The attack came after JaiHind TV, a local Malayalam-language TV channel owned by Indian National Congress, broadcast a report claiming that some coffee shops and restaurants in Kozhikode had become centres of "immoral activities" in a series of events leading to Kiss of Love protest. On March 8, 2017 Moral policing happened in marine drive Kochi against the kiss of love activists. As the ‘moral police’ unleashed attack on a few couples who were reluctant to disperse, about 20 other couples present at the spot fled in fear. ‘‘Some of the couples were seen pleading to let them go. But the group abused some of the females and caned them,’’ said an eyewitness. Similar events were later organized in Delhi, Kolkata, and other cities.

== See also ==
- Nanny state
- Conservatism in India
- Censorship in India
- Pink Chaddi campaign
- 2014 Kiss of Love protest
