= Valentine's Day in Pakistan =

Though Valentine's Day in Pakistan is officially banned, and the Islamist orthodoxy has taken steps to obstruct celebrations, many Pakistanis celebrate the day's festivities. In recent years, youth and commercial establishments in Pakistan have supported Valentine's Day festivities and celebrating love and romantic friendships.

Pakistan is the fifth most populous country and in a population 60 percent of which is below age 30 and half below 18, many are influenced more by global trends than traditions. Valentine's Day serves annually as a flash point of the culture war in Pakistan as it is a cause célèbre for religious hard-liners, affording conservatives a chance assert themselves as the caretakers of Islamic identity. On the other hand, with or without the moral policing, couples are finding ways to defy the ban and celebrate the event. Acceptance of the celebrations over the years is seen as a generational change indicating new cultural norms and a move toward love marriages.

== Antagonism ==
The socio-religio-political Islamist antagonism and judicial overreach in Pakistan towards love and Valentine's Day in Pakistan is difficult for outsiders to comprehend. Technically, love is not haram (forbidden) in Islam, but gender segregation and gender mixing prohibitions stifle the freedom of Muslim women. Access to public spaces for women is severely constrained and conservative, rigid interpretations of Islam create limits on women's behavior. In the conservative view, women are not allowed to show their faces, not allowed to talk to unrelated men unless the communication is essential, and despite Islam offering the freedom to choose one's life partner, in most cases, Pakistani women are unable to choose their life partner, as that is a decision made by the head of the family.

Women's freedom is scorned by conservatives and extremist institutions in Pakistani society. The focus is not simply to restrict women's free expression on a particular day but to subjugate women to strengthen male dominance through their seclusion from public life. The complex rules of purdah (seclusion) which reinforce purity and family honor, have led to socio-cultural disparities, in every aspect of women's lives. Lacking an understanding of their civil, legal, and political rights, women's opportunities for participation in society are limited and they are left vulnerable to exploitation, oppression, and abusive control by others without adequate recourse.

In theory, under Islamic law in Pakistan, the marriage parties must consent to marriage, women must be sixteen years old, and a contract must be drawn, but few women are aware of these rights unless a male relative has informed them. Lack of enforcement and non-compliance with the law is fairly widespread. Though love marriages are on the rise, arranged marriage, forced marriage, and illegal marriages, such as Haq Bakshish, a practice where a woman is married to the Quran; those where the dowry is withheld; or those where age or polygamy restrictions are ignored still occur in various regions. Theoretically out of wedlock love affairs are unsurprising to Muslims, as the Prophet Mohamed engaged in business with Khadija before marrying Khadija and Muhammad Ali Jinnah, founder of Pakistan, and his wife Ruttie Petit's love story has been widely chronicled. Even forced religious conversion and marriage of young non-Muslim women are cast as love matches.

According to Iqra S. Cheema significant population of Pakistan is younger and many do dating, but Pakistani cultural approach about the same is, 'do but don't tell'. Cheema says most of Pakistan's popular poets write about the lips, eyes, hair, and much more of their beloveds, traditions celebrate and sings folklores about love of Heer Ranjha, Sassi Pannu, Sohni Manhiwal and; hence celebration of Valentine's day can not be only blamed solely on western culture.

According to Fatima S Attarwala Pakistani society accepts aged men to marry girls even fifty years young to them, but the Islamic Republic of Pakistan forbids the free expression of love. In practice, however, even a minor hint of a pre-marital or extra-marital relationship might result in an acid attack or honor killing upon a Muslim woman. In this climate, Valentine's Day is depicted by conservatives as a celebration of loose morals and sexual promiscuity. For years, Valentine's Day has drawn protests from several religious organizations claiming celebrations of the day violate Islamic sensibilities and traditions. As with many public spaces in which officials and conservative Muslim youth groups morally police, university couples are asked to produce proof of being married and administration officials have suggested that women be gifted hijabs for modesty.

According to Cheema, those having financial means and access to private spaces can anyway find ways to continue celebrating Valentine's Day but those relatively disadvantaged middle or lower class get held up in the appeal of morality, culture, and tradition. Cheema says, rather than a healthier and more effective approach of trusting and enabling youngster’s confidence to make informed wise and right choices about their romantic life themselves; contrarian attempts of clergy and state to stop dynamic cultural change through appeals to religion and culture and shaming the people, are unlikely to succeed.

=== Pakistani universities' role ===
Social sciences researchers Saira Akhtar, Rashid Minhas, Ghulam Shabbir, and Shumaila Umer, from 3 Pakistan universities, concluded that acceptance of Valentine's Day celebrations largely stem from the process of modernization:

"....Modernisations affect the religious festivals which further leads to a tendency towards valentine and individualism. Modernization is a source of secularization that decreases religious hold and causes individualism, psychological problems, and loss of faith and belief. It is extracted that modernization affects the norms and values of Islam and is specified that it disturbs the Purdah system, female modesty and loss of respect of elders".

Other researchers conclude that as Valentine's Day is a cultural import and secular, it should be avoided. A team from COMSATS Institute of Information Technology, concluded that the celebration of any holiday (Valentine's Day, April Fools Day, etc.) posed threats to Islamic society because of their secular nature.

College campuses have been used to radicalize students and socialize them toward conservative politics. One such group, Islami Jamiat-e-Talaba (IJT) uses literature to socialize its members and ingrain specific religious and socio-political values in them. The organization views itself as a gatekeeper of Islamic values, acting to shut down unethical or unIslamic activities and prevent universities from becoming secular and westernized. This includes preventing couples from commingling or sitting together on Valentine's Day and in 2014 erupted into rioting in Peshawar when rival student groups protested celebrating Valentine's Day. In a well-publicized case from 2015, activist Sabeen Mahmud, known for staging protests in Karachi in favor of Valentine's Day, was murdered by a student who had been radicalized while attending the Institute of Business Administration.

To dissuade Pakistani youth from expressing love on 2022 Valentine's day too Pakistan's educational institutions and universities came up with various restrictions or alternate ideas of celebration like haya i.e. modesty day or sisters and mothers day. On February 14 Wearing red on educational campuses becomes unacceptable, One Islamic International Medical College affiliated with Riphah International University's special notification asked female students to keep their heads, neck, and chest covered on 14 Feb as per the college's dress code. Male students were asked to sport a white prayer cap and both genders were asked to maintain a mandatory distance of two meters between male and female genders and announced a fine of five thousand Pakistani Rupees for breaking rules or celebrating Valentine's Day. As per Daily Pakistan news report, Islamic International Medical College's code of conduct advisory notification caused interesting memes on the Pakistani social media. Since a group of youth celebrating haya modesty day tends to clash against a youth group celebrating Valentine's Day as a day of love, University of Peshawar decided to announce February 14 as a holiday but officially under unrelated pretext as a compensatory holiday; but ended up in different a controversy over cricket dance and song performed on the day. A fake circular in the name of Punjab University of Lahore was circulated on Pakistani social media asking girl students to observe 14 Feb as modesty day and wear black hand gloves and socks along with whole body covering black burqas, Vice Chancellor of Punjab University of Lahore clarified on social media that the circular was a fake one.

=== Governmental and judicial reaction ===
In 2016, Mamnoon Hussain, President of Pakistan, said: "Valentine's Day has no connection with our culture and it should be avoided." The following year, Abdul Waheed filed a case in the Islamabad High Court alleging that the celebration of Valentine's Day was spreading "immorality, nudity and indecency" in Pakistan. The court ruling, delivered by Justice Shaukat Aziz Siddiqui, who had previously been an activist in Jamaat-e-Islami as well as a political candidate, barred the media from airing promotions of the celebration on television. The following year, the court banned any promotion of Valentine's Day in public spaces and extended the media ban to include electronic and print media as well. The rulings led to moral policing of public and commercial spaces with police targeting balloon and flower vendors, canceling planned entertainment events, and admonishments from Salafi youth groups urging women to adhere to modest behaviors. Business operators were also forced to change their marketing strategies, attempting to characterize their goods in a more "Islamic" context.

Among activist groups with political intent are the Deoband Madrassah Movement, DMM and Tableegh-e-Jamaat, which were themselves born out of reaction to western colonialism. The DMM originated in India in 1866, to protect Islamic education in the era of the British Raj. Their two-fold goals were to establish an Islamic state and to reform the religion towards a moralistic perfection, using independent madaris to train students in their value system. Tableegh-e-Jamaat was founded in 1927, as a grassroots movement and offshoot of DMM, aimed at empowering any Muslim to disseminate the teaching of the faith, as opposed to learning it in a madrasa. In Punjab, the DMM gained traction among urban workers and middle class through its literalist interpretation of Islamic scriptures, as taught in its educational curricula which was then widely exported throughout the country.

In present Pakistan, these organizations attempt to control the narrative of what Pakistani culture is and is not and are resistant to change, seeing culture as static, rather than dynamically changing. Their rigid narratives for opposing western influences are attempts to shift society back to a more pious path. Safia Bano, a philosophy lecturer, has noted that conservative backlash occurs because cultural change is happening. Traditionalists are pushing back against losing ground, to those who want to celebrate Valentine's Day. Despite claims that the holiday is imposing western values by activists from puritanical groups like Tableegh-e-Jamaat and DMM, the public has found ways to defy the bans by adopting novel alternative ways to celebrate Valentine's Day, by exchanging flowers or celebrating during the week, rather on February 14. Urban centers, which initially spurred the growth of such organizations, have also led to the downfall of traditionalism, in large part because of socioeconomic developments and the adoption of more modern lifestyles.

==== Honour killings in Pakistan ====
In an article published on 14 February 2016 in Forbes, journalist Sonya Rehman wrote, "while the world celebrates Valentine's Day, several Pakistani women succumb to honor killings by their very own kin". An honor killing is the homicide of a member of a family or social group by other members, due to the belief the victim has brought dishonor upon the family or community. The death of the victim is viewed as a way to restore the reputation and honor of the family. Pakistan has the world's highest prevalence of honor killings. The Human Rights Commission of Pakistan lists 460 cases of reported honor killings in 2017, with 194 males and 376 females as victims. Of these killings, 253 were sparked by the disapproval of illicit relations and 73 by the disapproval of marriage choice. Additionally, out of the known suspect relationship with victims, over 93% were family relationships. Although these are most likely only a sample of the actual honor killings that were completed during 2017, it still gives a glimpse into characteristics of honor killings in Pakistan. Sources disagree as to the exact number by year, but according to Human Rights Watch, NGOs/INGOs in the area estimate that around 1000 honor killings are carried out each year in Pakistan.

On 14 February 2016, social media icon, Qandeel Baloch, published a video berating politicians for banning celebrations of Valentine's Day. The video, along with other behaviors like appearing on news programs and talk shows to highlight the hypocrisy, posting revealing selfies with a religious cleric, and offering to strip for the national cricket team, eventually led her brother to murder her. He claimed he had killed her to save the family's honor because her videos had put the family in the media spotlight. Her murder was highly publicized leading to new Pakistani legislation in October 2016 to close a legal loophole which had allowed perpetrators of such murders to be freed, if their actions were forgiven by the victim's family. The legislation set the minimum penalty for perpetrators of honor killings at 25 years imprisonment.

=== Clerical reaction ===
Many clerics in Pakistan oppose celebrations of Valentine's Day, which they dub as immodest for encouraging expressions of love. Conservative clerics, like Hafiz Hussain Ahmed, who claimed in 2013 that celebrants of the day were likely to become parents within 9 months, decry the undercutting of traditional values. Outside of Pakistan, more moderate clergy see nothing wrong with celebrating Valentine's Day. Ahmed Qassem al-Ghamdi, a cleric and one-time chief of the religious police of Mecca proclaimed that Valentine's Day was not forbidden, as it was a positive celebration of a natural aspect of humans that had nothing to do with religion. Othman Battikh, Grand Mufti of Tunisia, also attached little significant harm to the day, instead noting that celebrations which bring people together are positive unless morals are violated. Ahmed Mamdouh, an Egyptian legal secretary, at the Dar al-Ifta al-Misriyyah, issued an edict supporting a day of love.

== Public reaction ==
=== In favour ===
According to Fatima S Attarwala, instead of Pakistani government and establishment squandering their time on policing individual choices they are needed to focus more time promoting economics; Attarwala says that the amount of loan Pakistan pleads to IMF, 4 times of that U.S. citizens tend to spend on Valentine's Day. Despite overarching official antagonism and overreach against the celebration of Valentine's Day, people have found ways to still celebrate love and the holiday has steadily gained popularity. Pakistani couples exchange balloons, chocolates, and flowers, often photographing themselves in front of a wall of red and pink flowers. To avoid pressure from moral policing, balloon sellers have avoided heart-shaped and red balloons, opting to sell star, bird, or animal shapes. Other celebrants find alternate ways to partake in festivities, such as virtual dates, skyping with partners, or browsing online advertisements in search of privately available gifts or events. Some shopkeepers have taken steps to appear compliant with restrictions on selling red roses while acknowledging that they had hidden stashes to supply regular, known customers. Other commercial establishments have shifted their promotions around the holiday to online and social media outlets, recommending delivery services to avoid scrutiny.

Valentine's day related queries like, "Valentine's Day 2021 best wishes", "Happy Valentine's day to my wife", "Happy Valentine's wallpaper", "significant lover", "happiness", "wish", flowers, e-cards, teddy bears, rose bears and chocolate-covered strawberries trend on social media and google.

According to the 2022, Valentine's Day news report of Attarwala, car rental company Careem gets 5 to 10 percent additional business on Valentine's day. Clothes market sees just a small bump on Valentines Day but the market is tapped in the first week of February itself with discount sales, some brands focus on sari's business on the occasion. Bakery products, chocolates, and flower businesses benefit most on Valentine's Day in Pakistan with a 40 to 400% increase in sales. Assorted gift business at least doubles up on Valentine's day, and sales of roses increase in huge numbers. Except few orthodox minded, most fast food chains and restaurants tend to see by approximate 30 percent upward business on Valentine’s Day in Pakistan.

=== Against ===
Many institutions and individuals have offered substitutes for Valentine's Day, suggesting it should be used for a day to reach out to "refugees, internally displaced people, patients of terminal illnesses, survivors of abuse and rape, victims of natural disasters and survivors of man-made wars and terrorism". Friends' Day, Modesty Day (Haya Day), Sister's Day, and Family Day, have been introduced by Islami Jamiat-e-Talaba as alternative solutions for countering observations of love on February 14.

== Celebrity celebrations ==
Pakistani actors Minal Khan and Ahsan Mohsin Ikram got engaged on Valentine's Day of 2021; Ahsan wishing Minal Khan "Happy Valentine’s Day!" with a red heart emoji, Khan also texting a mutual smiling photograph with a red heart balloon against a pink backdrop, with a caption "Love is in the air. Simple and sweet," being Valentine's Day theme. Ikram also subsequently posted a picture of Khan, wearing a ring on her finger on his Instagram.

Some other celebrity couples like; Momal Sheikh and Nader Nawaz, Shaniera and Wasim Akram, Zara Noor Abbas and Asad Siddiqui, Naimal Khawar and Hamza Ali Abbasi, Sarwat Gilani and Fahad Mirza, Aiman Khan, and Muneeb Butt, posted their pictures on social media on 2021 Valentine's Day.

=== Celebration in diaspora ===
Armeena and Fesl Khan posted their picture on Valentine's Day 2021 while they were married on the previous year's Valentine's Day in 2020.

== See also ==
- Human rights in Pakistan
- Honour killing in Pakistan
- Valentine's Day in India
- Valentine's Day in Iran
- Valentine's Day in Bangladesh

== Bibliography ==
- Zia, Afiya Shehrbano. Defiance not subservience New directions in the Pakistani Women's Movement, Chapter 9, Work: Gender, Governance, and Islam. Germany, Edinburgh University Press, 2019. Pages: 165-185
