= 2014 Kiss of Love protest =

Non-violent protest against moral policing

Kiss of Love Protest
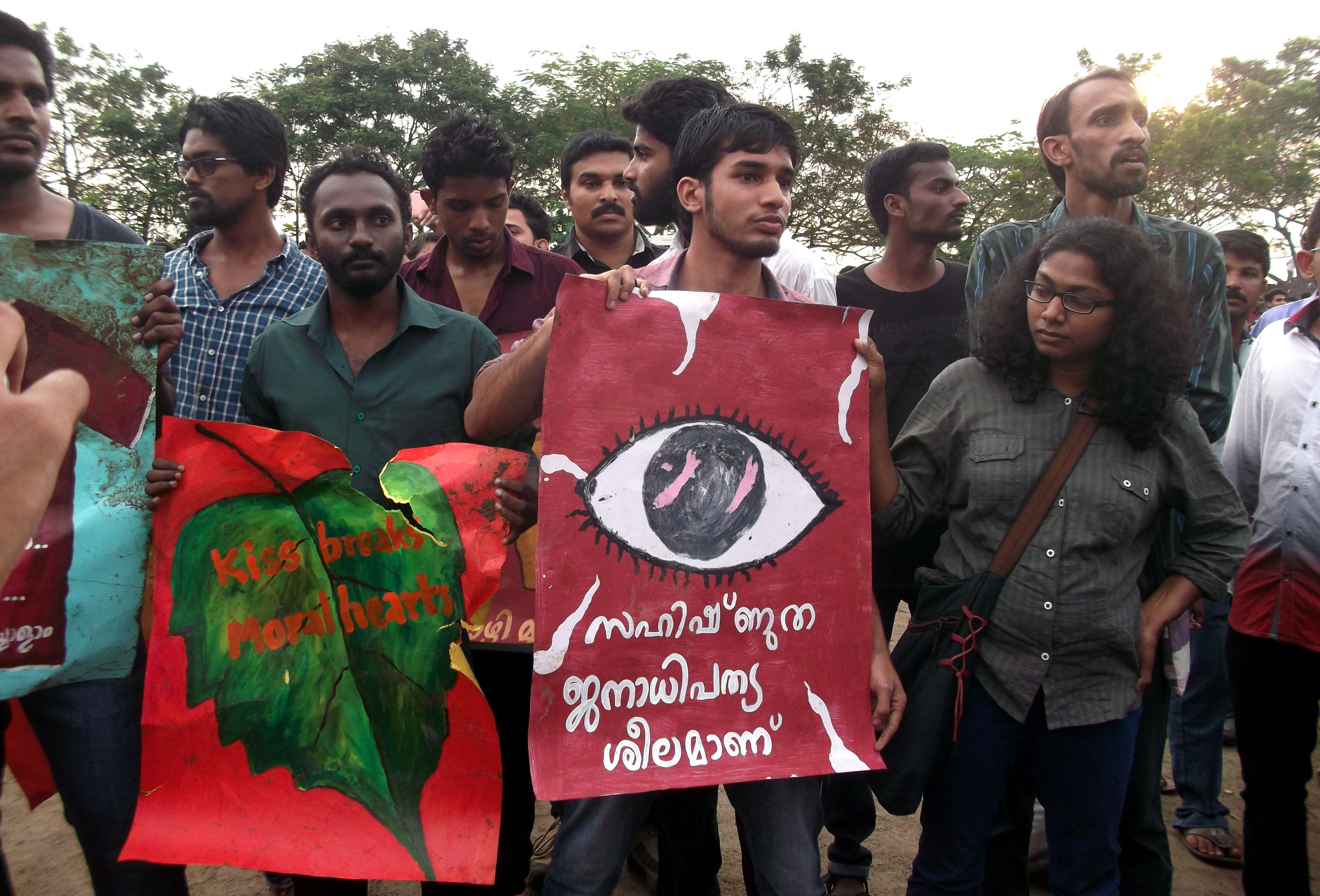
- Protest in Ernakulam
- Date: 2 November 2014 (Initial outburst)
- Location: Thiruvananthapuram, Kochi, New Delhi, Mumbai, Kozhikode, Hyderabad, Kolkata, Chennai
- Caused by: Multiple instances of moral policing
- Methods: Protest by French kissing, hugging and holding hands

Casualties
- Arrested: Around 50
- Charged: Around 100

The Kiss of Love protest was a non-violent protest against moral policing. The movement began in response to an incident of vandalism of a cafe in Kozhikode by an ultra-conservative and right-wing vigilante group over reports of public display of affection in the cafe. The protest, organized through a Facebook page, called forth youth across Kerala to participate in the protest on 2 November 2014, at Marine Drive, Kochi by kissing in public. After the initial protest in Kochi, similar protests were organized in other major cities of the country.

== Background ==
In the 2000s and early 2010s, there were a series of high-profile incidents of violence against individuals for perceived obscene conduct. Attacks were carried out by both police and vigilante actors.

=== Legality ===
Section 294(a) of the Indian Penal Code states that "Whoever, to the annoyance of others, does any obscene act in any public place shall be punished with imprisonment for a term which may extend to three months, or with fine, or with both". IPC does not define the word 'obscene', hence it is interpreted differently by different authorities. The Supreme Court has noted that '"obscenity" should be gauged with respect to contemporary community standards'.

The court has also observed that the 'standards of contemporary society in India are ... fast changing' in Chandrakant Kalyandas Kakodar vs The State Of Maharashtra And Ors (1969). Regarding 'contemporary community standards', the Supreme Court has noted that it is not 'the standard of a group of susceptible or sensitive persons' that can be held as the standard of the community, in Aveek Sarkar & Anr vs State of West Bengal And Anr (2014). Regarding social morality, the Supreme Court has observed that "notions of social morality are inherently subjective and the criminal law cannot be used as a means to unduly interfere with the domain of personal autonomy" in S. Khushboo vs Kanniammal & Anr (2010). Now regarding kissing and hugging in public places, the Supreme Court of India has made it clear that 'no case can be made out' of two people consensually hugging and/or kissing. The Supreme Court gave this verdict in response to a petition by actor Richard Gere to quash the arrest warrant issued by a Jaipur court. The arrest warrant was issued after the actor had taken Shilpa Shetty in his embrace and kissed her on the cheek at an AIDS awareness program. A verdict by the Delhi High Court has also made it clear that kissing in public is not a criminal offense.

=== Origins ===
The Kiss of Love protest began in October 2014 when Jai Hind TV, a Malayalam news channel owned by the Indian National Congress, telecast an exclusive report on alleged immoral activity at the parking space of Downtown Cafe in Kozhikode. The video showed a young couple kissing and hugging each other. A mob of attackers, who were later identified as belonging to the Bharatiya Janata Yuva Morcha, vandalized the cafe following the report.

Following this, a group of friends from a Facebook page called 'Freethinkers', started the Facebook page 'Kiss of Love'. Kollam-based women's rights activist Resmi R Nair was the co-founder and spokesperson of the Kiss of Love protest. Activists from all over Kerala decided to protest against the series of moral policing incidents by organizing a public event at Marine Drive Beach, Kochi on November 2.

== Activities ==
On November 2, 2014, activists gathered at Marine Drive, Kochi to express solidarity with the movement against moral policing. A planned march proceeded from the campus of Ernakulam Law College to the venue, during which the police took around 50 activists into preventive custody, citing law and order issues. Various religious and political groups also gathered on the protest grounds to physically prevent the activists from kissing and hugging in public. This included members from the Bharatiya Janata Yuva Morcha, SDPI, Vishva Hindu Parishad, Shiv Sena, Bajrang Dal, and Hindu Sena. The Kerala Police was criticized for its failure to control the event. Police allowed counter-protesters—which included members of Shiv Sena, SDPI, and Bajrang Dal—to attack the protesters. Although they attempted to physically stop the Kiss of Love protesters from legally protesting, none of the counter-protesters were removed. Police later claimed that they arrested the Kiss of Love protesters to save the protesters' lives. The protest also went viral on social networking sites and in the news media with supporters of the campaign had been posting pictures of themselves kissing on social networking sites. The Facebook page had garnered more than 154,404 followers.

A group of students at Maharaja's College, Ernakulam protested against moral policing by conducting an event named 'Hug of Love'. All the participants were later suspended for 10 days by the college authorities for violating their code of conduct. Another group of students from the Government Law College Kozhikode organized an event called Hug of Love on 10 December. Authorities took this as an act of indiscipline and served show cause notice to participants.

A protest against moral policing in Thiruvananthapuram with kisses and hugs under the banner 'kiss against fascism' was conducted before the Kairali theatre complex during the 19th International Film Festival of Kerala (IFFK) on 13 December.

A Kiss protest dubbed 'Kiss In The Streets' was organized on 7 December in Kozhikode. Right-wing opponents of the kiss protest issued threats before the event, stating that protesters would be stripped naked in public if they attempted to kiss. The event was marred by violence towards the protesters by Shiv Sena and Hanuman Sena. Police caned and took the Kiss of Love protesters and their opponents into preventive custody. Protesters claimed that Kerala Police were more brutal than their right-wing opponents.

== Response ==
=== Support outside Kerala ===
The event gathered support from educational institutions outside of Kerala including the University of Hyderabad, JNU Delhi, IISER Kolkata, Pondicherry University, IIT Madras, and IIT Bombay. Students from Jadavpur University and Presidency University, Kolkata organized similar protests against moral policing in Kolkata on 5 November 2014. The Kolkata chapter also protested against the authorities of North Kolkata's Star Theatre for allegedly refusing entry to a 17-year-old girl because she was dressed in a skirt.

On November 8, a group of protestors demonstrated by kissing and hugging outside RSS headquarters in Delhi. While JNU students were at the forefront, there were representatives from several universities in the city such as Delhi University, Jamia Millia Islamia, Ambedkar University Delhi, and National Law University. Hindu Sena members arrived on the scene stating that the "Western culture was corrupting and degrading Indian culture". Hindu Sena members tried to physically attack kissing couples. On November 9, a similar protest was organized by students on the JNU campus, in solidarity with those who courted police action at the 'Kiss of Love' event in Kochi on November 2. A Kiss of Love event that was scheduled for 30 November in Bengaluru was canceled when permission for the protest was denied by Bengaluru Police.

=== Opposition ===
Kiss of Love was met with opposition and criticism from certain sections of Indian society. Several religious and political groups such as Bharatiya Janata Yuva Morcha, SDPI, Sunni Yuvajana Sangham, Vishva Hindu Parishad, Shiv Sena, Bajrang Dal, Hindu Sena, Campus Front, Samastha Kerala Sunni Yuvajana Sanghom, Pattali Makkal Katchi, Hindu Makkal Katchi, and the Ernakulam wing of Kerala Students Union opposed this movement. These opposing groups claimed that public display of affection is against both Indian culture and the law of the land (under section 294 of the Indian Penal Code). The Kerala State Women's Commission opposed Kiss of Love stating that it was against the culture of Kerala.

The proposed Kiss of Love event in Bengaluru received opposition from several quarters including Manjula Manasa, chairperson of the Karnataka State Women's Commission, Akhil Bharatiya Hindu Mahasabha, several Congress and BJP leaders, and various Hindutva proponents also opposed it. Bengaluru Police refused permission for the event, stating that kissing is an obscene act. Pramod Muthalik of Sri Ram Sena, the organizer behind the 2009 Mangalore pub attack, threatened to take the law into his hands if the campaign was held.

== See also ==
- SlutWalk
- Vigilante attacks in Kerala
