= Valentine's Day in Bangladesh =

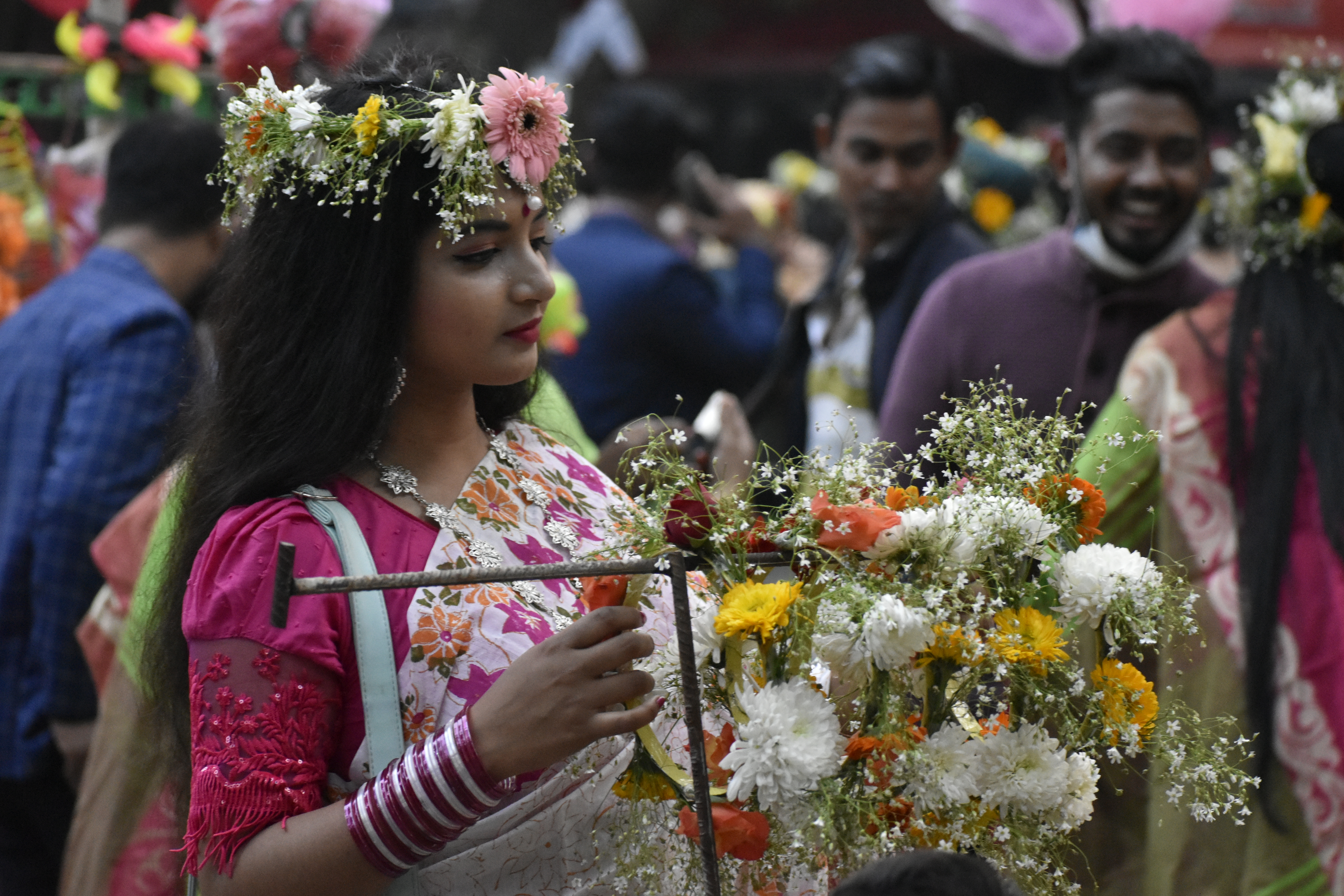
Girl with flowers in the Valentine's Day

In Bangladesh, the Valentine's Day (Bengali: ভালোবাসা দিবস, romanized: Bhālōbāsā Dibôs, lit. 'Love Day') has been celebrated since the 1990s. On the day, people, especially the young, exchange various greeting cards, flowers, chocolates or gifts. Despite widespread celebrations, the country's conservative society views the celebration of the day as un-Islamic subculture, often considered as part of the Western culture. From 2020 onwards, Valentine's Day has coincided with the Pohela Falgun celebration in Bangladesh.

== History ==
Before the introduction of Valentine's Day, the country celebrated "Authoritarianism Resistance Day" popularly on the same date, signifying the student deaths protesting against the education policy of the authoritarian leader Hussain Muhammad Ershad on 14 February 1983.

In 1993, Valentine's Day was first individually celebrated in Bangladesh by Shafik Rehman, a journalist and editor of Jaijaidin. While studying in London, he was acquainted with the Western culture. He highlighted Valentine's Day to the Bangladeshis through his newspaper, Jaijaidin. It is learned that when someone went to his newspaper office in Tejgaon for a job, he had to take his girlfriend. Rehman was the first to use the title Bhālōbāsā Dibôs for Valentine's Day in Bengali language; for this he is called the "Father of Valentine's Day in Bangladesh". He also named Love Road, the street in front of his office. His news outlet, Jaijaidin, played a crucial role in popularising the day. Rehman also created the popular television programme Lal Golap (lit. 'Red Rose'), which is about sharing messages of love and affection. The programme was broadcast on Bangladesh Television from 1993 to 2010 and on Banglavision from 2011 to 2016, when then-Awami League government forcefully shut down the programme. It was resumed on Banglavision channel in December 2024 following the fall of the AL government.

Those Bangladeshis who were more cosmopolitan embraced the global Valentine's Day observance, while those who were more conservative rejected the imported western celebration as un-Islamic, in particular because of its emphasis on romance between unmarried boys and girls. As recently as 2008, tensions between the two sides were high enough that many university students were afraid to celebrate the day on campus.

More recently, western popular culture and global consumer culture have shifted Bangladeshi attitudes towards acceptance of Valentine's Day. By 2018, it became common in Bangladesh for romance films to premiere on Valentine's Day and for businesses to offer special deals to couples on 14 February.

From 2020 onwards, due to changes to the Bangladeshi calendar, Pohela Falgun spring festival is celebrated on 14 February, making the day celebrated with Valentine's Day in the country.

On Valentine's Day 2025, the "Valentine's Medal" was launched for the first time in Bangladesh, which would be given annually by the Valentine's Day Celebration Committee, in collaboration with Rehman's Jaijaidin.

== Celebrations ==
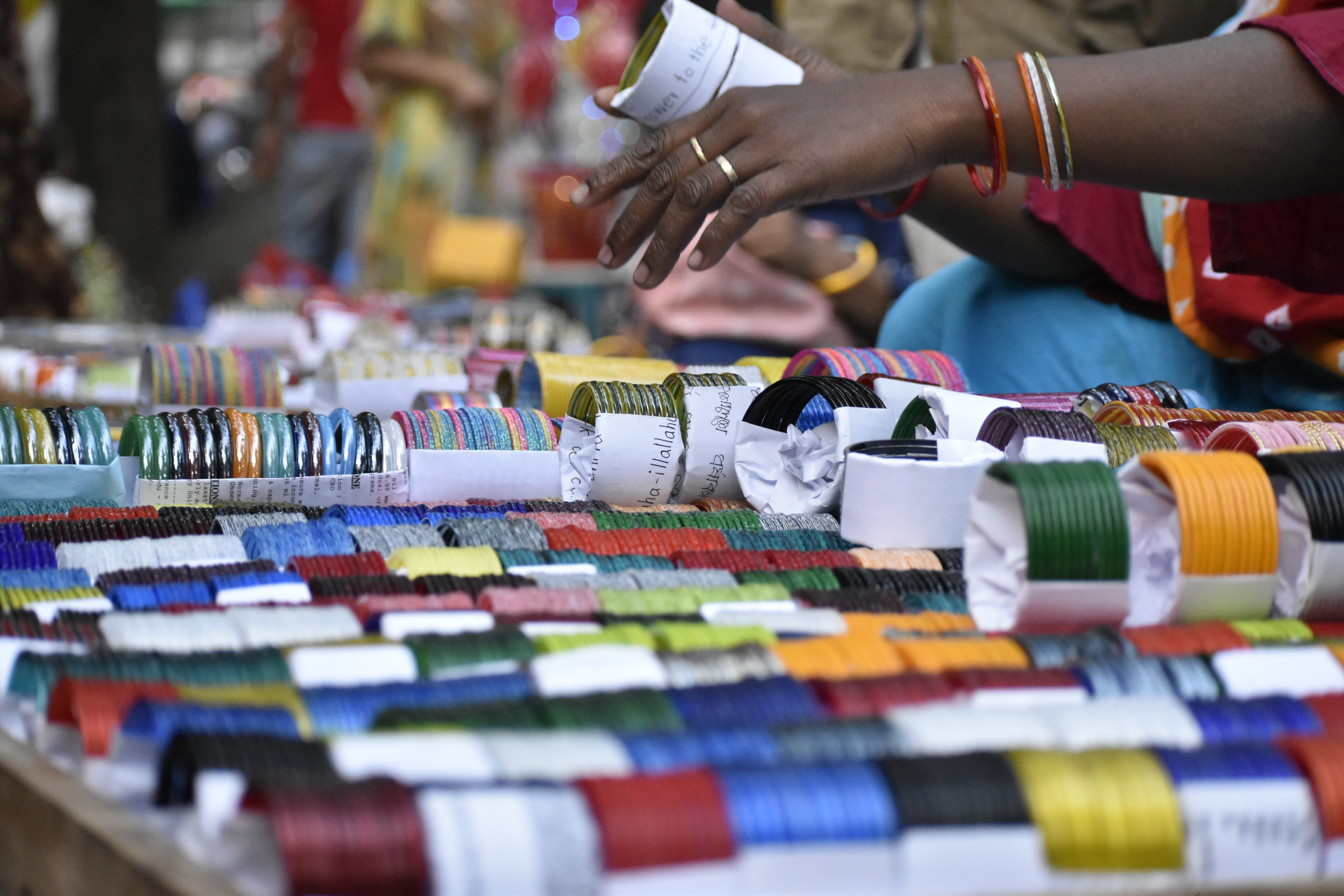
Vendor selling bangles in the Valentine's Day

This day is mainly celebrated in the urban areas of the country. Historically, the day had no effect in the villages, but in recent times, the day has partially influenced the village society also. No public holiday is declared on this day in Bangladesh.

On the day, people in various bonds, including mainly lovers, friends, husbands and wives, and also parents and children, students and teachers express their love for each other with flowers, chocolates, cards and other gifts. On this day, various parks and recreation centers of the country are full of people.

== Incidents ==
In recent years, incidents of rape and sexual assaults have been reported on Valentine's Day occasion. On 14 February 2020, a teenage girl, who went out to celebrate the day, was abducted and gang-raped by her friends while being filmed. On 14 February 2021, a fourteen-year-old girl was raped in Jhalokhathi by her boyfriend who called her out on the day. On 14 February 2025, a Madrasa student went to a resort in Sherpur for vacation with her friends, where she was raped by two local boys. Following the incident, her mother attempted to commit suicide.

On 14 February 2025, a violent mob under the banner of "Towhidi Janata" vandalised flower shops for selling flowers on the occasion of Valentine's Day and Pohela Falgun and staged protests in front of restaurants. As a result, Udichi Shilpigoshthi was forced to cancel their planned Spring Festival event.

== Gallery ==
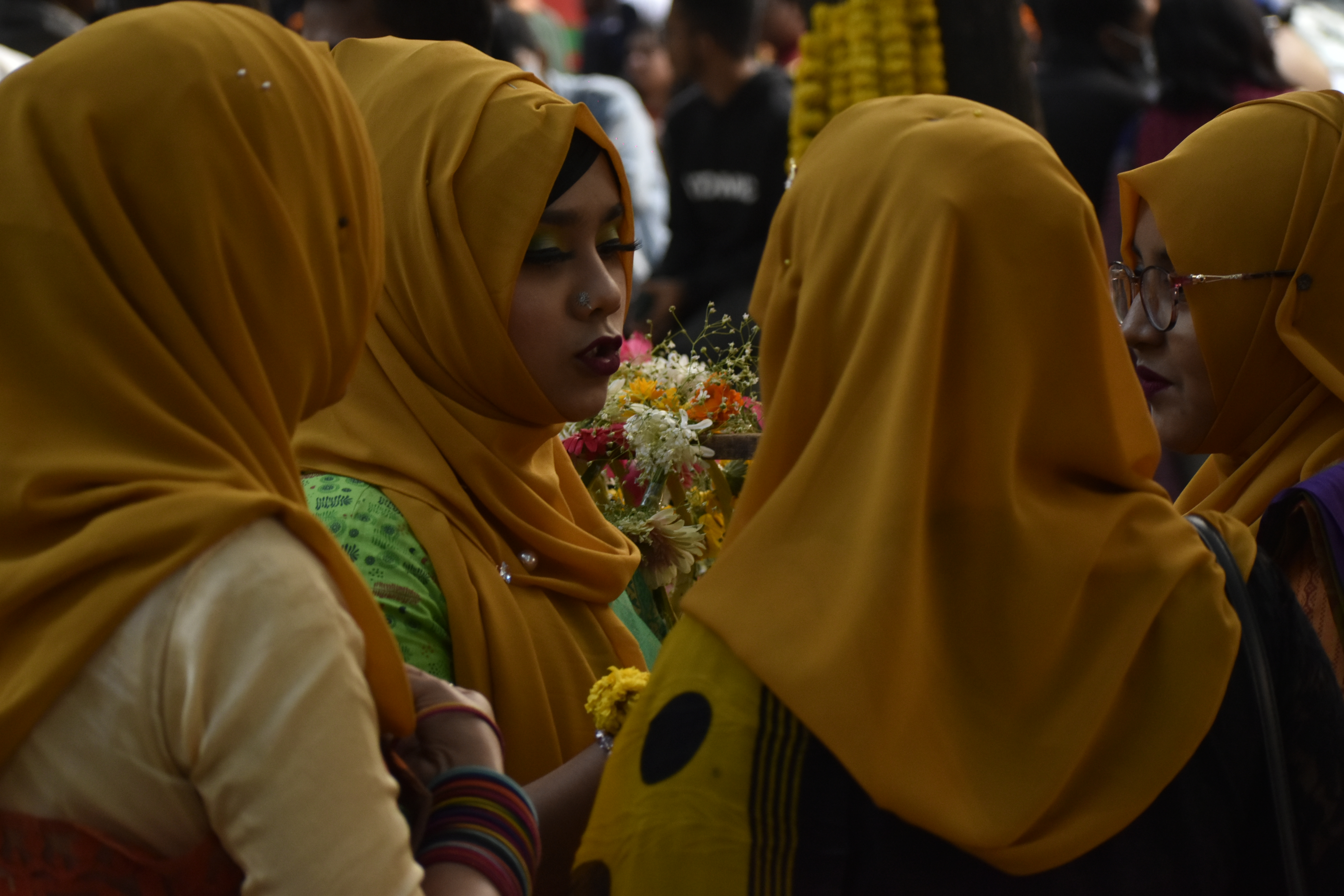

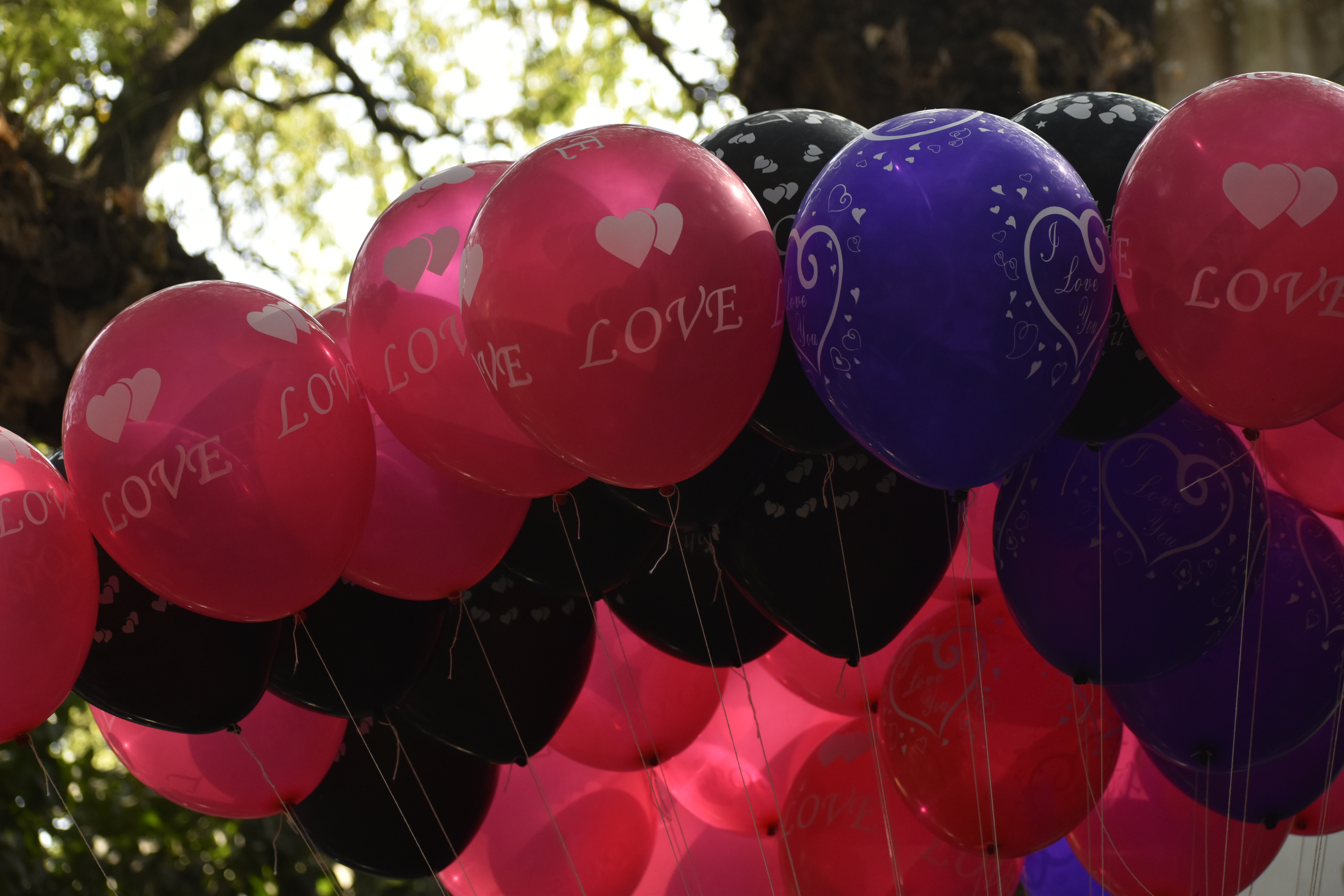

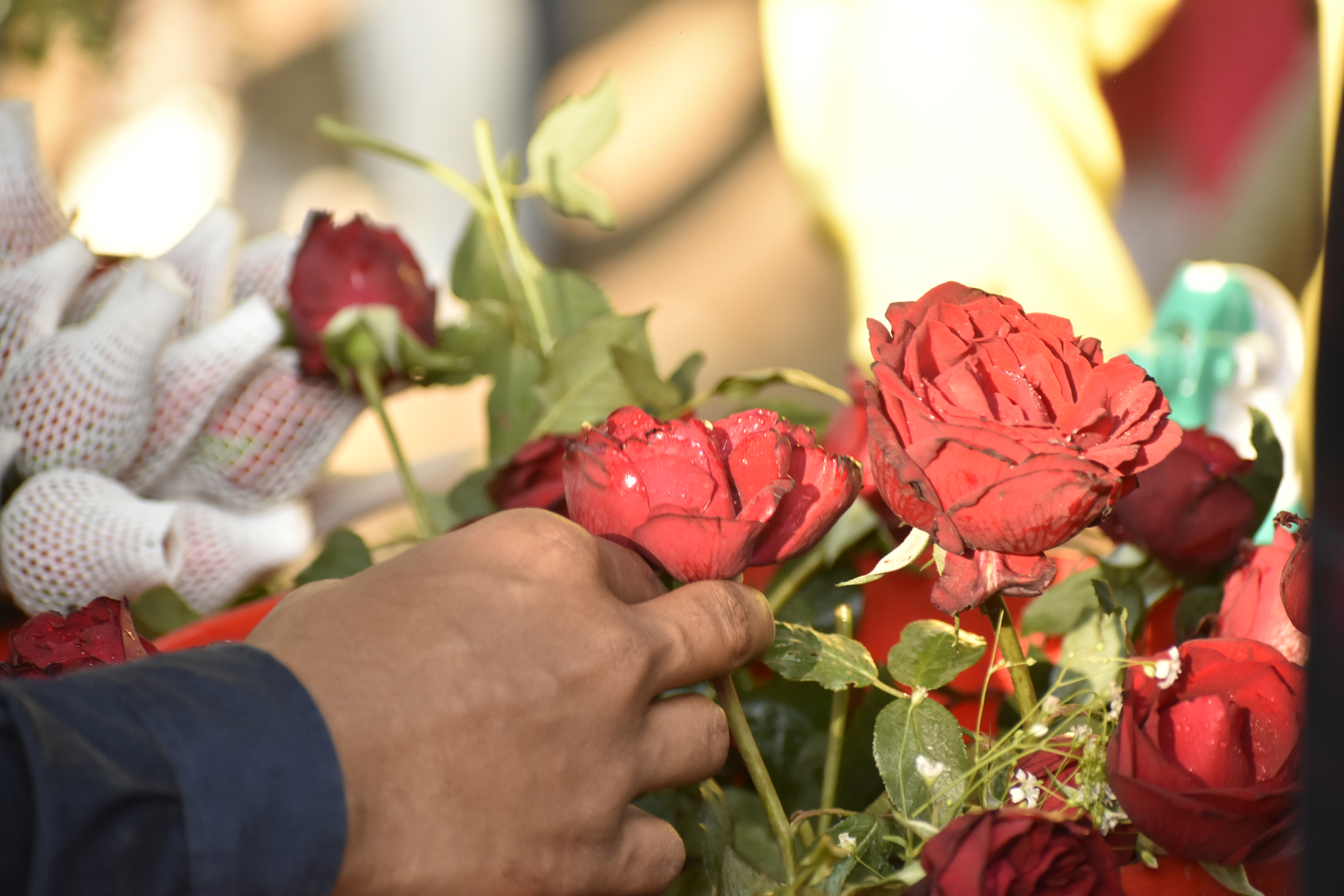

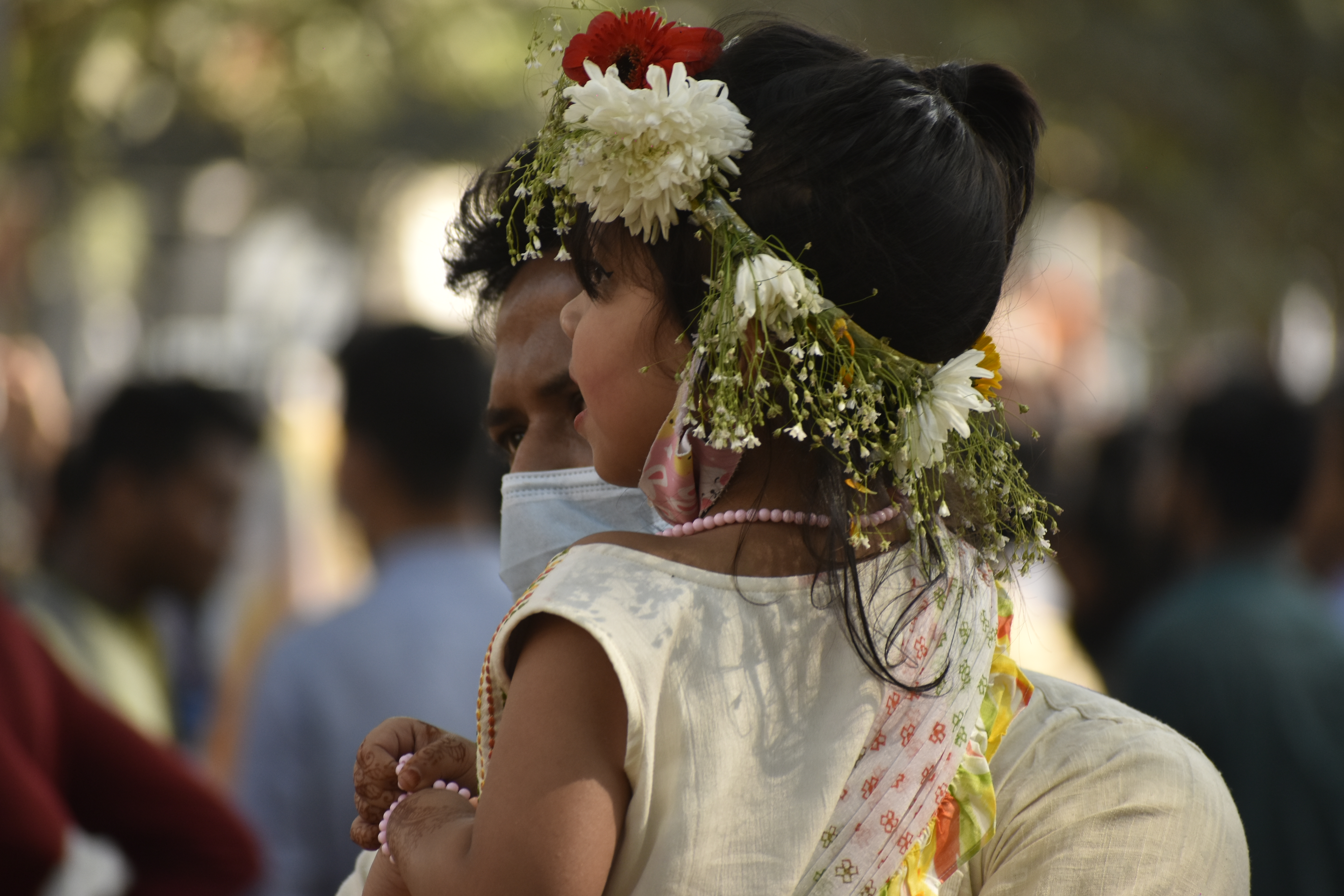

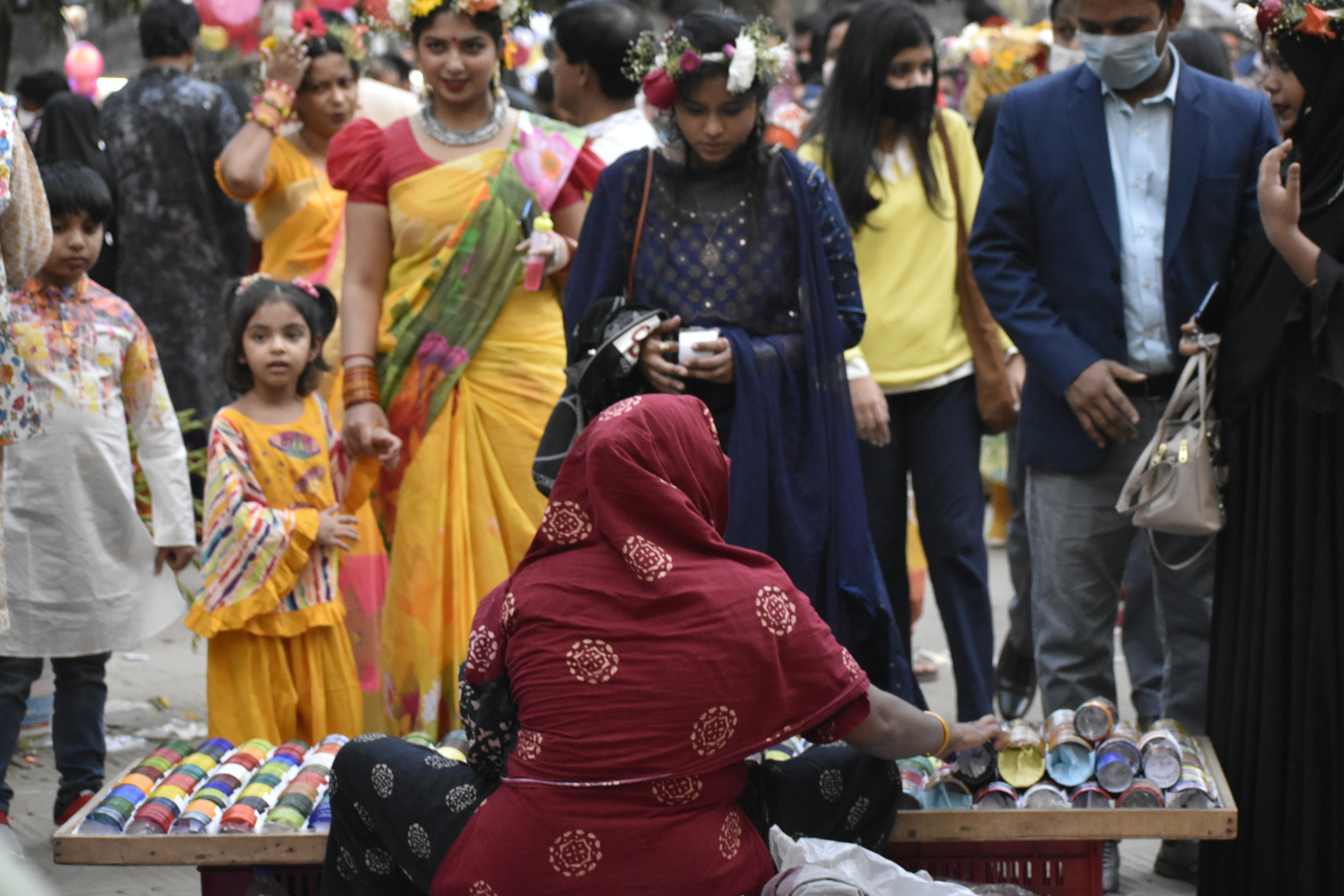

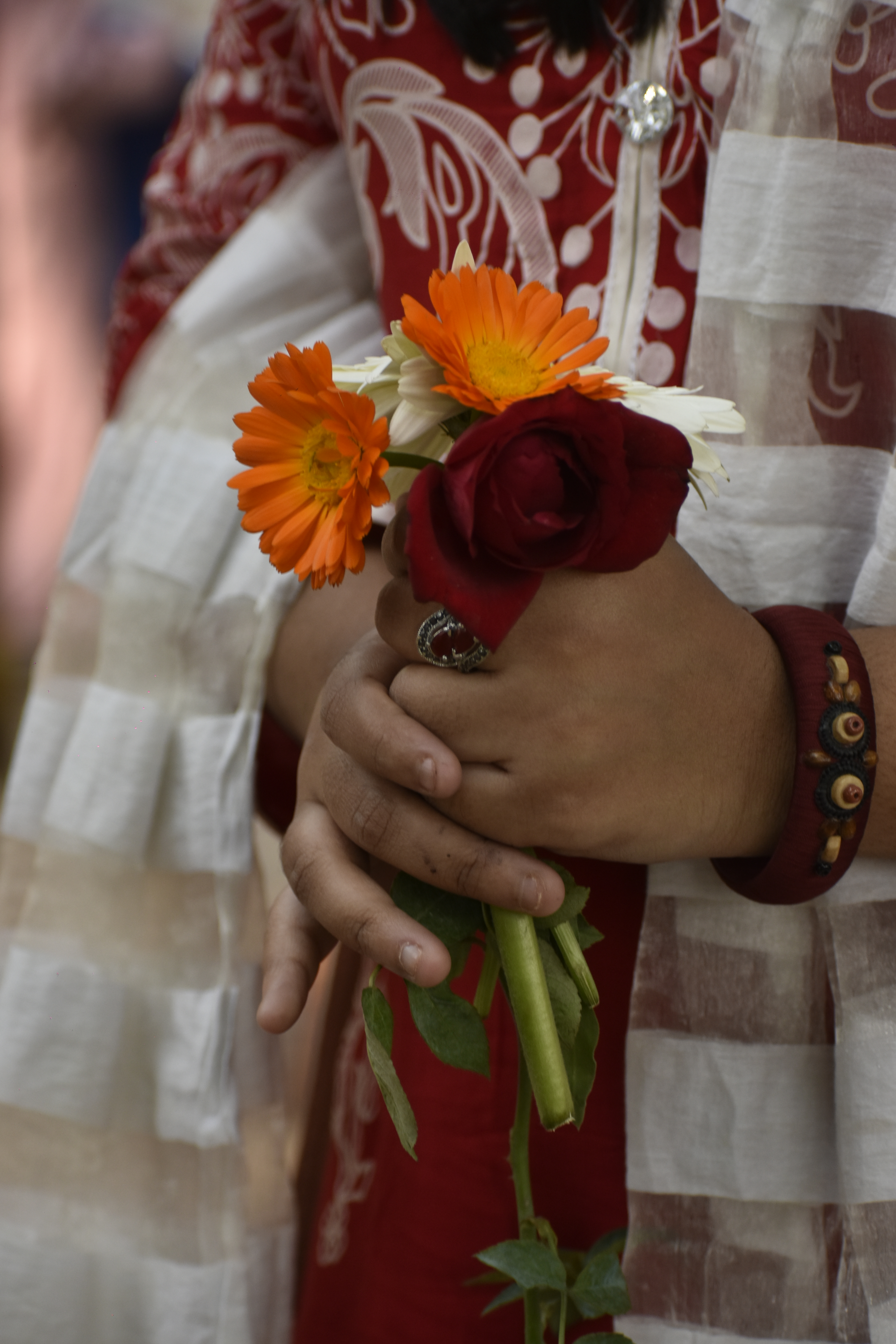

== See also ==
- Kache Ashar Golpo
- Valentine's Day in India
- Valentine's Day in Pakistan
- Valentine's Day in Iran
