= Pink Chaddi Campaign =

Indian Women's Response to Hindu Radicals

The Pink Chaddi Campaign (or Pink Underwear Campaign) is a nonviolent protest movement launched by Consortium of Pub-Going, Loose and Forward Women in February 2009, in response to notable incidences of violent ultra-conservative and right-wing vigilantism; against perceived violations of Hindu culture by women, who were attacked at a pub in Mangalore. The campaign was a brainchild of Nisha Susan, an employee of Tehelka political magazine.

The campaign was conceived particularly in protest against a threat by Pramod Muthalik of the Sri Ram Sena (also spelled as Sri Ram Sene and Sriram Sena), a Hindu extremist group based in Mangalore. Muthalik threatened to marry off and take other action on any young couples found together on Valentine's Day. Valentine's Day is traditionally not observed in India, as it is celebrated in Western cultures.

== Background ==
On 24th January 2009 a group men attacked a group of women in Mangalore, India. The attack was an isolated incident and allegedly carried out by members of the Shri Rama Sene. Later that month, Muthalik announced an action plan to target couples found dating on 14 February, Valentine's Day. He said "Our activists will go around with a priest, a turmeric stub and a mangalsutra on 14 February. If we come across couples being together in public and expressing their love, we will take them to the nearest temple and conduct their marriage.

On 9 February 2009, Home Minister P. Chidambaram said that "Sri Ram Sene is a threat to the country. The Centre is watching its activities with great concern".

== Pink Chaddi campaign ==
In the midst of the tension, a protest was started by a group of young women, called the "Pink Chaddi" campaign, where they urged a peaceful protest (described as Gandhian in the press) to all of India, by sending pink underwear ("Chaddi" in Hindi) to Muthalik's office on Valentine's Day. The novel form of protest was initiated by Nisha Susan, Mihira Sood, Jasmeen Patheja and Isha Manchanda As the protest grew, underwear started pouring in from locations all over India in solidarity for the "Love Sena". Over 500 pink chaddis were couriered on Friday. Other cities collected hundreds of such chaddis and decided to courier them directly.

== Reaction to the campaign ==
The Pink Chaddi Campaign received widespread media coverage, and the Facebook group saw numbers of members growing exponentially in the following days. A few reports were also critical of the campaign accusing it of trivialising an important issue like attack on women.

There was also political reaction to the campaign as supporters of Rashtriya Swayamsevak Sangh (RSS) objected to use of pictures of RSS members on the campaign blog. RSS had criticised the Mangalore attack and favoured ban on the Sri Ram Sena. The blog owner removed the pictures of RSS members following this objection.

A counter-campaign calling itself "The Pink Condom Campaign" was started by some unknown activists a few days before Valentine's Day.

== Preventive custody ==
As an additional precaution, Muthalik and 140 others of the Sri Ram Sena were held in preventive custody on Valentine's Eve.

== See also ==
- Eve teasing
- Besharmi Morcha
- Kiss of Love
- The Blank Noise project
- Sexism in India
- Human rights in India
- Feminism in India
- Rape in India
- Sexual harassment
- Groping
- Rape culture
