= Jaijaidin =

Bangladeshi daily newspaper

- 24-05-2023 cover of Jaijaidin.
- Type: Daily newspaper
- Format: Broadsheet
- Owner(s): Jaijaidin Mediaplex; Jaijaidin Publication Limited, HRC Group (2007-2025); Jaijaidin Mediaplex (2025-present)
- Publisher: Shafik Rehman (original edition); Sayeed Hossain Chowdhury; Kazi Rukanuddin Ahmed (2007-2025); Shafik Rehman (2025-present)
- Founded: 1984
- Political alignment: Independent
- Language: Bengali
- Headquarters: Love Road, Tejgaon, Dhaka, Bangladesh
- Website: jaijaidin.news

Jaijaidin (Bengali: যায়যায়দিন Jaijaidin) is a Bengali-language daily newspaper published from Dhaka, Bangladesh.

== Editor ==
In Bangladesh, Jaijaidin was published and edited by Shafik Rehman, but he lost the editorship of Jaijaidin in 2008 for his stand against a military-backed government. Kazi Rukanuddin Ahmed is now the acting editor. Sayeed Hossain Chowdhury is now the chairman of the Board of Editors. It used to be published as a weekly until mid-2006, at which point, it became a daily. It came into fame during the 1980s because of its modern outlook and strong stance against the military ruler Hossain Mohammad Ershad. At one point, it was banned by Ershad. It started republication after democracy was restored in 1991.

Following the fall of the Sheikh Hasina-led Awami League government, Bangladesh Police raided the newspaper to arrest the owner of the newspaper, Saeed Hossain Chowdhury. He was charged in a murder case filed by the Students Against Discrimination. Shafik Rehman regained control of the newspaper with the support of the new regime.The incident led to a de facto split in the publication's management. As of early 2026, two separate versions of Jaijaidin are being published from different addresses in Dhaka. These versions operate under different editorial boards and editors, reflecting an ongoing legal and administrative dispute over the newspaper's official ownership and brand. To distinguish his edition from the rival publication, the version led by Shafik Rehman incorporates a red rose symbol (🌹) as a prefix to the newspaper's masthead title in front page and online portal. As of February 2026, the only online version that is accessible is the one edited by Shafik Rehman.

== Location ==
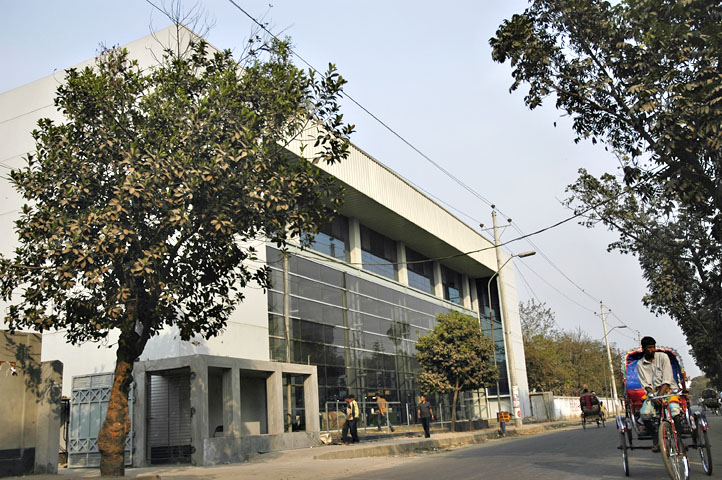

It is located in the HRC Bhaban, 46 Kawran Bazar, Com. Area, Dhaka, Bangladesh Tejgaon Industrial Area.

The South Building has three floors. The ground floor houses the printing section, the commercial department, circulation department and the Reception desk. The first floor is open for visitors. The Clinton room is the round table room. It was opened formally by the US ambassador to Bangladesh Patricia Butenis. The Mahathir Room is the place to organize workshops. The Monroe Studio is used for staged photo shoot for the newspaper and for recording television programs. The Hitchcock Hall is a 40-seat movie theatre. then comes the Picasso Gallery and the Che Cafe. It is the place for the popular entertainment article "10 minutes at the Che Café". The second floor is the work place for journalists. The News, Editorial, Feature, IT and Photography departments are housed here. The Floor has 176 desks for Journalists.

The North Building has two floors. The printing paper storage is on the ground floor. The power generation facility is on this floor as well. The first floor has a 44-bed Dormitory. This dorm facility is for the students from the remote places of the country invited by the newspaper for a short visit to Dhaka to have a practical idea of the internal structure of a daily newspaper. The paper offers free short courses for the students as well. This floor also has the Mao Canteen.

== Other information ==
Shafik Rehman's Jaijaidin has introduced in Bangladesh celebration of Love Day (ভালবাসা দিবস) Bhalobasha Dibôsh (Valentine's Day) on 14 February. Jaijaidin first introduced special issues with the articles from mass readers. Special magazines are written by mass people, and these magazines helped create thousands of freelance writers in Bangladesh. The publication is the writing place for most non-resident Bangladeshi's. Beside introducing Valentine's Day this was the first Bangladeshi news publication to have its own website. As a weekly the Jaijaidin first implemented the idea of Reader's Poll to elect the most popular performing artists.

== Ownership changes ==
The declaration of the Jaijaidin newspaper edited by Sayeed Hossain Chowdhury was cancelled on March 12, 2025, due to the violated Section 10 of the Printing Presses and Publications (Declaration and Registration) Act, 1973. An office order in this regard was issued by the Dhaka District Administration.

On March 18, 2025, Shafik Rehman regained the declaration of the newspaper.

== See also ==
- List of newspapers in Bangladesh
