= 2009 Mangalore pub attack =

2009 attack in India

Coordinates: 12.8704°N 74.8469°E

Video of the attacks

On 24 January 2009, the Sri Ram Sena attacked a group of young women and men in a pub in Mangalore, India. A group of 40 activists of the Sri Rama Sena barged into the pub "Amnesia – The Lounge" and beat up a group of young women and men, claiming the women were violating traditional Indian values. Two of the women were hospitalised. The video of the incident has become one of the most watched clips on YouTube, though how the TV crew happened to be ready at the 'unannounced' attack is not known.

According to statements of staff at the Amnesia Pub at the Hotel Woodside in the busy Balmatta area of Mangalore, two men approached the front desk of the hotel an hour before the actual attack took place at 4:30 pm on Saturday, reportedly claiming rights to inspect the premises. However, local police officials claimed the hotel staff had not made any reference to an extortion attempt or on previous occasions.

The police also suspect that the real hidden agenda could have been extortion, the fact is that by claiming responsibility, a group will be able to extort money from similar establishments later.

"Whoever has done this has done a good job. Girls going to pubs is not acceptable. So, whatever the Sena members did was right. You are highlighting this small incident to malign the BJP government in the state," said founder Pramod Muthalik.

In 2018, Muthalik along with 24 others were acquitted by the court from the charges related to the pub attack.

== Arrests ==
Prasad Attavar speaks about the attack outside court on 31 January

The Karnataka Police have picked up Prasad Attavar, the convenor of the Sri Ram Sena, along with Lohith, another member of the outfit. Police sources declared that they were hiding ever since the incident in an area called Adyar in Mangalore. The police is still looking for another key member of the outfit by the name Dinakar, who had claimed responsibility for the attack. The Sri Ram Sena chief Prasad Attavar claimed that these girls are like his sisters and he would not approve of anyone raising their hand on his sisters and this is just a minor incident that has been blown out of proportion. The police sources said that there were 40 persons involved in the attack in all and till now they had picked up 19 of them.

Around 27 people were arrested related to this incident till now. The Sri Rama Sena, which has 1,000–1,500 cadre in the Coastal Karnataka region, has threatened to carry out a state-wide bandh (strike) if Muthalik is not released by 29 January 2009, Thursday evening A pub attack victim has told NDTV that she received threat calls.

== Public reaction ==
The Pink Chaddi Campaign, nonviolent protest movement was launched in India in response to notable incidences of violent conservative and right-wing activism against perceived violations of Indian culture. The campaign was conceived particularly in protest against a threat by Pramod Muthalik.

== Reactions ==
On 3 February 2009, Pravin Valke, founding member of the Sri Rama Sene, told The Indian Express, "These girls come from all over India, drink, smoke, and walk around in the night spoiling the traditional girls of Mangalore. Why should girls go to pubs? Are they going to serve their future husbands alcohol? Should they not be learning to make chapattis [Indian bread]? Bars and pubs should be for men only. We wanted to ensure that all women in Mangalore are home by 7 p.m."

Shri Ram Sena chief Pramod Muthalik later apologised for the attack on weekend revelers at a Mangalore pub, saying the way the right-wing group acted "was wrong" but insisted it was done to "save our mothers and daughters". He was later arrested under IPC section 153 by the Karnataka Police.

The Chief Minister of Karnataka B. S. Yeddyurappa had said the Sriram Sena is not a Sangh Parivar outfit and asserted that stringent action will be taken against the culprits. He also has ruled out banning the Sri Ram Sena even though the outfit's chief admitted to wrongdoing. The Ram Sena chief has threatened a similar protest on Valentine's Day.

Pramod Muthalik, a full-time Rashtriya Swayamsevak Sangh (RSS) man earlier was the Karnataka coordinator of the Bajrang Dal four years ago. Soon he was expelled from the Bajrang Dal after which he joined the Shiv Sena and later he formed his own group. Pramod Multhalik has over 45 cases pending against him. Most of these cases are still under investigation. A look at the chargesheet makes it clear that he has never been arrested for any of these cases. Pramod even recently held a press meet in Bangalore to release the photographs of the members of Hindu suicide squad undergoing training in handling arms and ammunition to take on Muslim Jihadis. According to Mutalik there are 1,132 members in the suicide squad.

The Janata Dal (Secular) chief and the former Prime Minister of India, H. D. Deve Gowda on 26 January 2009, accused Karnataka Chief Minister B. S. Yeddyurappa of being responsible for Talibanisation of Karnataka.

The mayor of Mangalore filed an FIR against Women and Child Development Minister Renuka Chowdhury for her reference to the Talibanisation of Mangalore.

Toeing the right-wing group Sri Ram Sene Pramod Muthalik's line, Karnataka CM Yeddyurappa has said that pub culture is wrong and should not be permitted. One of the woman victims of the attack on a Mangalore pub on Monday claimed that the Sri Ram Sena activists hurled abuses at them and called them prostitutes".

== National Commission for Women controversy ==
The National Commission for Women (NCW) constituted a three-member team to investigate the attack on women in the pub.

In what was termed a shocking statement, the NCW put the blame on the girls who were beaten. They also implicated the pub.

Nirmala Venkatesh, a member of the three-member NCW team, blamed the pub for the attacks, saying they did not have adequate security to protect against a mob of 40 men. She also stated that a live band was playing, and the girls partaking in this could have been another cause. She said her concern was that the media coverage had tarnished the image of Karnataka. She stated that as per information available to her, several of the girls were from North India.

"Everybody was dancing wearing so many nude clothes (sic) and all. That is why they did what they did, they (the attackers) said. We women should always try to safeguard ourselves," Nirmala Venkatesh said.

Asked for an assessment of the incident, she strangely stated that she has found illegal activities going on in some hotels and pubs in Mangalore, including prostitution. She claimed to have conducted a surprise raid on one of the hotels and found "that not everything was going on legally."

Numerous reports have talked about the victims receiving threatening phone calls. The victims are said to be in a state of fear, and have not come forward to register complaints. In relation to this, Nirmala Venkatesh had a different view: "If the girls feel they were not doing anything wrong why are they afraid to come forward and give a statement?"

She stated that she was not concentrating on the Sri Ram Sena group, but that she will interrogate the owner of the pub, and the media persons present. She stated that she held the pub's staff culpable.

The NCW investigation has focused solely on the license and documentation of the attacked pub. The NCW advised the police to look into alleged misuse of the licence. According to Ms. Venkatesh, the NCW will recommend the cancellation of the pub's license. The NCW team is also investigating the register of guests, claiming it is suspicious.

Nirmala Venkatesh met with the culprits who perpetrated the attack and provided counselling for them. She has, however, not talked to any of the victims of the attack.

The Sri Ram Sena has thanked the NCW for helping spread its message to other states.

In her report to the commission, Nirmala blamed the owner of the pub for not providing security to women guests, and recommended suspension of its license. While claiming that she was unable to trace the victims, she met the accused in jail. At one point in time, she even suggested that women refrain from wearing "skimpy" and provocative dresses. When her report was not accepted by the Commission, Nirmala even challenged the authority of Minister for Women and Child Development Renuka Chowdhury. Nirmala Venkatesh was removed from her office of National Commission for Women member by the Ministry of Women and Child Development for failing to conduct an unbiased enquiry.

Nirmala Venkatesh joined the Bharatiya Janata Party (BJP) shortly after this, and declared that she was ready to contest the coming Lok Sabha elections if she was given a ticket.

== See also ==
- Pink chaddi campaign
- 2012 Mangalore Homestay attack
- Moral police
