= Shafik Rehman =

Bangladeshi journalist and writer

- শফিক রেহমান
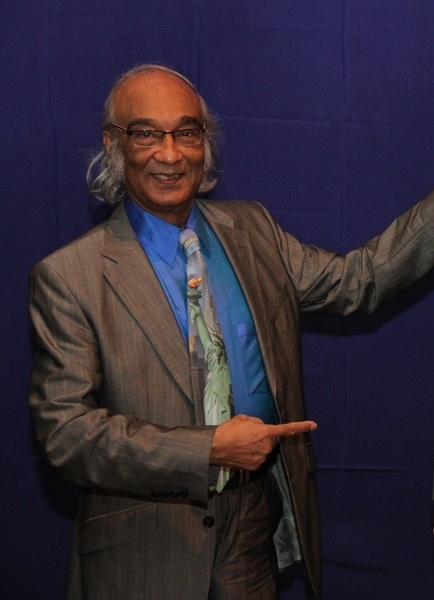
- Rehman in 2012
- Born: Shafik-ur-Rahman; 11 November 1934 (age 91); Bogra, Bengal Province, British Raj
- Education: Dhaka College; University of Dhaka; Institute of Chartered Accountants in England and Wales
- Occupations: Journalist; writer
- Spouse: Taleya Rehman
- Children: 1
- Awards: Ekushey Padak (2026)

Shafik Rehman (born 11 November 1934) is a Bangladeshi journalist, political analyst, and writer. He is credited for introducing Valentine's Day in Bangladesh. He is also the presenter of the television show Lal Golap, aired on Banglavision.

He has worked to gather support in favour of Bangladesh in England with Justice Abu Sayeed Chowdhury during the liberation war of Bangladesh in 1971. Rehman founded the weekly Jaijaidin in 1984 which was critical to General Hussain Muhammad Ershad, a military leader who assumed power through a military coup in 1982. He was forced to leave the country in 1986 after the Ershad government suspended the declaration of Jaijaidin and was not allowed to return Bangladesh till 1991. Rehman was a director of Spectrum Radio in England.

Rehman has been serving as the editor of magazine Mouchake Dhil from 2009. Rehman was arrested on April 16, 2016, on the charge of "plotting to abduct and kill" Bangladesh Prime Minister's son Sajeeb Wazed Joy. However, in 2025 he was acquitted. In 2026, he was awarded with the Ekushe Padak, for his special contribution to journalism.

== Early life and education ==
Rehman was born as Shafik-ur-Rahman on November 11, 1934, in Bogra. His father Sayeed-ur-Rahman was a professor of Philosophy in the University of Dhaka who taught Sheikh Mujibur Rahman as well.

Rehman studied in the Saint Gregory's School of the capital's Old Dhaka area from where he passed his matriculation in 1949. After the matriculation, he joined Dhaka College and passed intermediate examinations in 1951. He then completed his bachelor's and master's degrees in Economics in 1956 from University of Dhaka. He went to England to complete his higher studies and joined Institute of Chartered Accountants in England and Wales from where he passed the exams for Chartered Accountancy in 1965. He later returned to Bangladesh and played an important role in the country's journalism and political analysis. Shafiq Rehman will always be remembered for his career and various contributions.

== Career ==
=== Accountant ===
Rehman, after attaining chartered accountant status, worked in several multinational companies in England, Japan and Arab countries as an accountant. Later, in 1969, he joined the chartered accountant firm of the country "Rahman Rahman Huq" as a senior partner where he had worked with prominent economist and three-time finance minister of Bangladesh, Saifur Rahman joined the Hotel InterContinental Dhaka and worked there till the liberation war of Bangladesh broke out.

=== Journalist ===
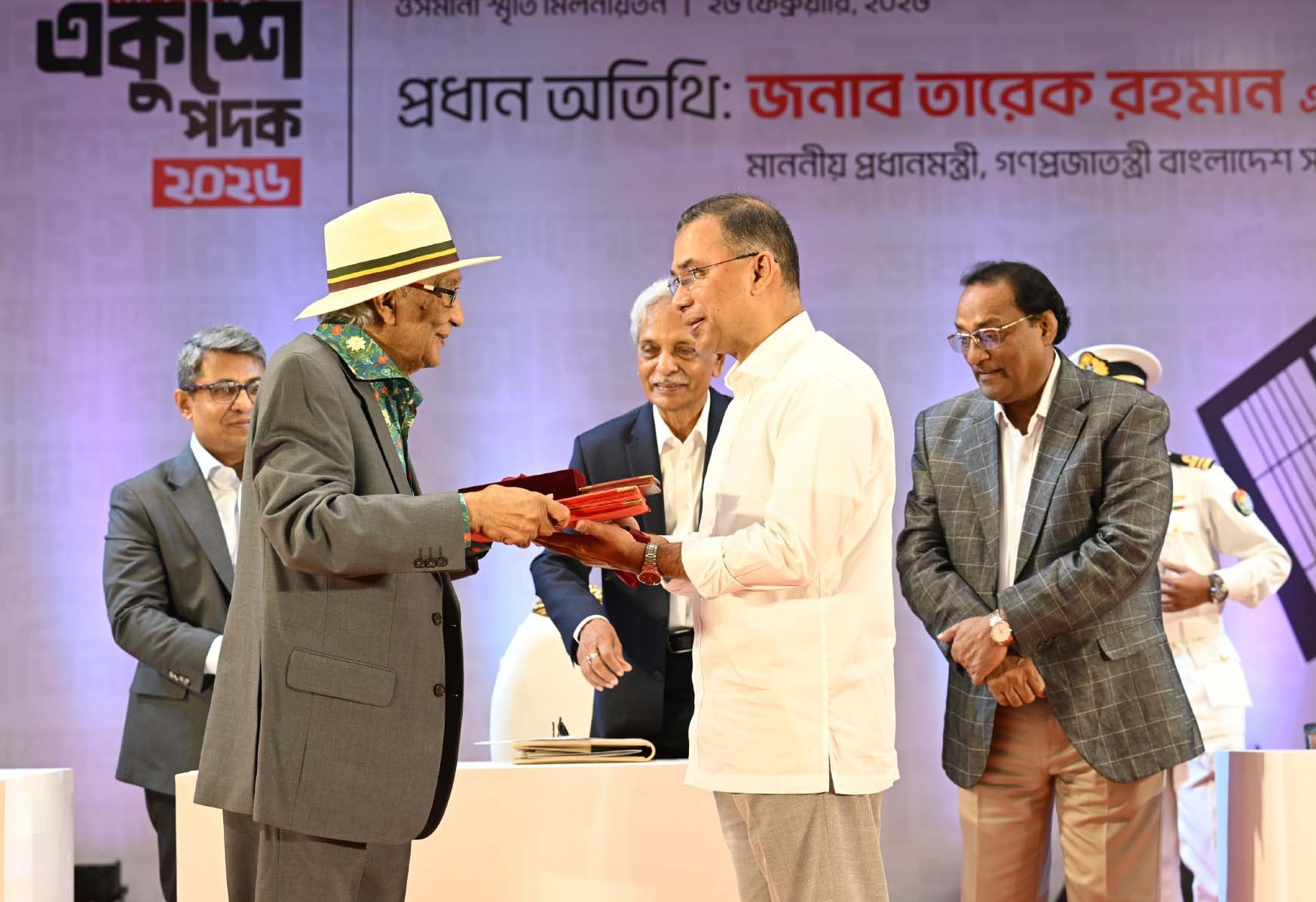
Rehman receives Ekushey Padak from Prime Minister Tarique Rahman in February 2026

Rehman published a hand-written magazine while studying in Saint Gregory's School namely Shachitra 10, around 1949. In 1984, he founded the weekly satirical magazine, Jaijaidin. It became the most popular weekly within a few months. The satirical representation of social and political issues in the magazine made it a voice of the urban middle-class. Jaijaidin was known for being critical to Hussain Muhammad Ershad, the chief of staff of the Bangladesh Army who replaced a democratically elected president in 1982 and later declared himself as the president in 1983 through a bloodless coup.

Rehman criticized the national election of 1986 and the process of choosing 30 women for reserved seats in the parliament. He termed the 30 reserved seats as the 30 pieces of ornaments of Ershad. Ershad got infuriated by this and declared not to allow Rehman to return to Bangladesh when he left Bangladesh for England on an official trip. He was not allowed to return to Bangladesh until 1991. Rehman had worked at the BBC. He was a director of Spectrum Radio in London that became one of the most popular radio stations of England. He was among the two Asian Directors of the station. After the fall of General Ershad through a popular uprising in 1990, and the arrival of Bangladesh Nationalist Party in power, Rehman was allowed to return to Bangladesh. On his arrival he started publishing weekly Jaijaidin again.

In 2002, he came up with an art show Lal Golap (Red Rose) on the state-run BTV channel. Later, after the change of government, he continued broadcasting it on a private channel, Banglavision. This weekly Jaijaidin converted into a daily newspaper in 2006 with Rehman as editor. But he was forced to sell the ownership in 2008 and had to leave the country again during the military-backed caretaker government of 2007-08 for being critical of the regime. In December 2008, he arrived Bangladesh prior to the national election of December 28. He started editing the weekly Mouchake Dhil in 2009. Besides, he has been writing columns in dailies like Daily Naya Diganta, Amar Desh and Daily Dinkal till date.

== Personal life ==
Rehman is married to Taleya Rahman, a former broadcaster of BBC World Service and the founding executive director of an election watchdog "Democracy Watch". The couple has a son Sumit Rehman who resides in United Kingdom.

Besides being a Bangladeshi citizen, Rehman accepted UK citizenship when he was banished from Bangladesh in the 1980s.

== Role in the liberation war ==
Rehman played a significant role during the liberation war of Bangladesh in 1971. During the war, he went to England to assist Justice Abu Sayeed Chowdhury in gathering support for Bangladesh abroad.

== Political affiliation ==
Rehman does not hold any post in any of the parties in Bangladesh but has been seen as a sympathizer to BNP led by Tarique Rahman. He is considered to be an influential figure in the party and an active personality in the intellectual powerhouse of the party. He is widely perceived as an informal advisor of Khaleda Zia. He has been heading the pro-opposition think tank G-9 in recent years.

Amid holding no formal position, he served on the international affairs committee for the 6th National Council of BNP in 2016.

== Detention ==
Rehman was arrested on charges of a "plot to kill" Bangladesh Prime Minister's son Sajeeb Wazed Joy, a claim that was dismissed by a US district court. The metropolitan magistrate granted a 5-days remand for the journalist. In May 2025, he was acquitted of this case.
