= Bondita Acharya =

Indian human rights activist

Bondita Mrina (Formerly Acharya)
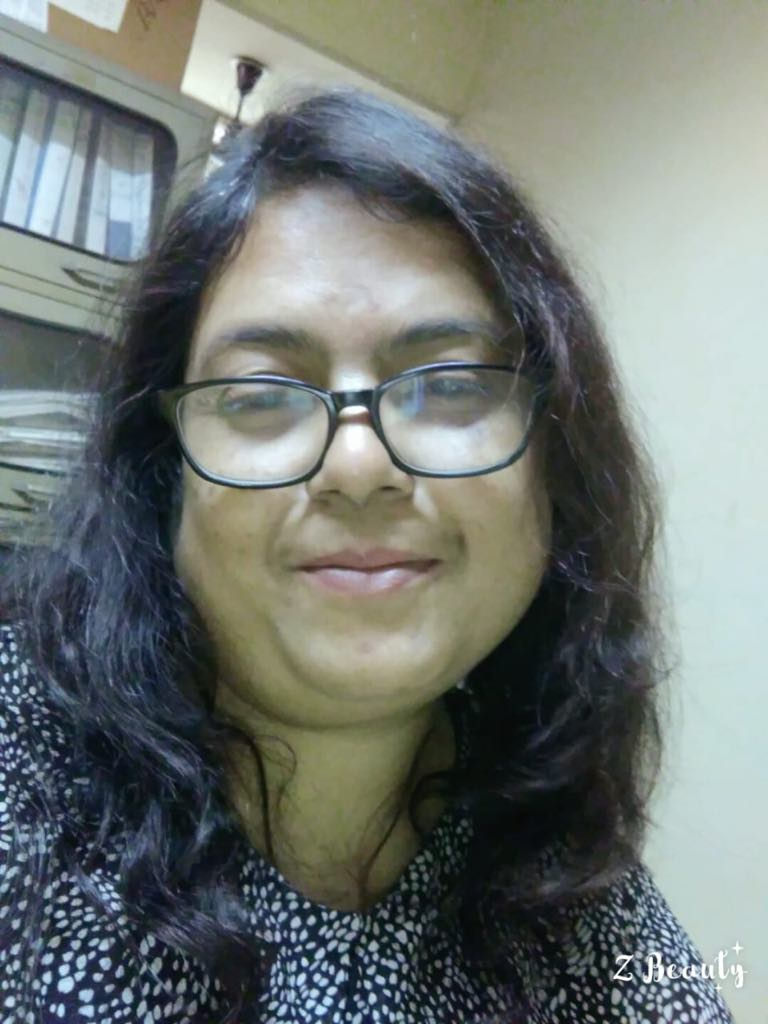
- Born: Bondita Goswami; 12 December 1972 (age 52); Jorhat, Assam, India
- Occupation: Human rights activists
- Parents: Jogananda Goswami; Mrinalini Goswami

Bondita Mrina (Assamese: বন্দিতা মৃণা) (born 12 December 1972) is a human rights defender from Jorhat, Assam, in Northeastern India.

== Personal life ==
Bondita Mrina was born to Jogananda Goswami, a Chemistry Professor at Jagannath Barooah College, Jorhat, and his wife Marinalini Goswami, who was the principal of ME Girls School at Jorhat. She is single parent of her son Palash Acharya after she lost her husband Keyur Acharya due to myocardial infarction.

== Education ==
Mrina did her schooling from Balya Bhavan, Jorhat. She did her 11th & 12th from JB College, where her father was professor. She pursued her Graduation from College of Home Science, Assam Agricultural University and Post Graduation from Department of Extension and Communication, Faculty of Home Science, MS University, Baroda, Gujarat.

== Career ==
She became part of Women in Governance – India (WinG-India) in 2009. She has been involved in documenting customary laws of north-eastern India and attempting to amend them, in order to improve women's rights, and in publicising and taking legal action over "forced disappearances" of women, including teacher and rights activist Majoni Das. She is the northeast coordinator of the NGO Human Rights Defenders Alert. She has been part of several fact-finding missions to document cases of sexual violence, human rights violations, witch hunting, and conflict situation in the Assam region of India.

Mrina is also a participant in the Women's Earth Alliance.

Mrina is one of the Gulmakai Champions of Malala Fund. The Gulmakai Network is Malala Fund’s signature initiative, which supports the work of education champions in developing countries. Malala Fund aims to close to this gap by connecting our Gulmakai Champions with each other and to the tools, training and partners they need to spark social and systemic change. There are 38 Gulmakai Champions. Bondita and PBET trained 60 education promoters from three tea gardens to increase awareness for the Plantation Labour Act (PLA) and Right to Education (RTE) Act. If successful in ensuring that tea plantations in Assam are PLA and RTE compliant, Bondita’s work will impact 15,200 girls.

== Controversy ==
On April 4, 2017, following a complaint from Bharatiya Janata Party member Mridupawan Bora, three people were arrested in Jorhat, Assam for possessing 500 grams of beef meant for consumption. The consumption of beef is taboo in Hinduism. The law under which the three were arrested, the Assam Cattle Preservation Act, does not criminalize the possession or consumption of beef, but, rather, sets forth the conditions under which cattle can be slaughtered, causing a question of whether the three could be arrested under the auspices of the act. Mrina condemned the arrests on social media. Bajrang Dal, a Hindu nationalist organization, issued a press statement demanding that Mrina issue a public apology for condemning the arrests.

On 10 April 2017, Mrina filed a complaint with the Criminal Investigation Department in Guwahati, Assam, after she was the target of violent threats on social media for condemning the arrest of three people for the possession of beef on 4 April 2017. Mrina was threatened with death, rape and acid attacks by members of Bajrang Dal.

== Helping NRC re-verification claimants ==
Bondita Mrina, a woman activist from Jorhat district, said "The sudden summoning of hundreds of people from lower Assam has caused untold miseries to NRC claimants who have appeared for re-everification of citizenship data. It is great to see locals of Mariani, Amguri and Jorhat, among others, come forward to give food to people who have come for NRC hearings from hundreds of miles away".

Volunteers from various organizations, including Bondita Mrina have come forward to help out NRC claimants.

Humane side to NRC: A healing touch

NRC re-verification: Good Samaritans give shelter, food to those who have to appear for hearings.

‘Only doing our duty’: In Upper Assam, locals pitch in to help thousands appearing for NRC hearings.

In Photos: How Good Samaritans Helped Those Travelling for NRC Re-Verification.
