= Section 294 of the Indian Penal Code =

Punishment for obscene acts or words in public

Section 294 of the Indian Penal Code lays down the punishment for obscene acts or words in public. The other section of Indian Penal code which deal with obscenity are 292 and 293. The law does not clearly define what would constitute an obscene act, but it would enter the domain of the state only when it takes place in a public place to the annoyance of others. Temple art or nakedness of sadhus are traditionally outside the purview of this section.

== Text ==
Whoever, to the annoyance of others;

(a) Does any obscene act in any public place, or
(b) Sings, recites or utters any obscene song, ballad or words, in or near any public place,

Shall be punished with imprisonment of either description for a term which may extend to three months, or with fine, or with both.

== Case law ==
- Dismissing a complaint that Richard Gere had acted obscenely by kissing Shilpa Shetty in public, the Supreme Court of India had observed that in this issue 'no case was made out'.
- Even after this verdict, complaints have been filed in courts claiming that kissing in public constitutes an offense under this section. Kiss of Love Protesters were threatened with lawsuits under this section.
- The Kerala High Court had observed that the performance of cabaret dance devoid of nudity and obscenity, judged according to the standards indicated was permissible, and was not in any way liable to be banned or prevented.
- Quashing a case against 13 men who were arrested for allegedly indulging in obscene acts with women in a flat, the Bombay High Court has said any such action done in a private place is not a criminal offence under the Indian Penal Code.
