= Haya Day =

Pakistani alternative to Valentine's Day

Haya Day (Urdu: یومِ‌ حیا) is a holiday celebrated on February 14 in Pakistan as a replacement to Valentine's Day. It was first celebrated by Islami Jamiat-e-Talaba.

== Celebrations ==
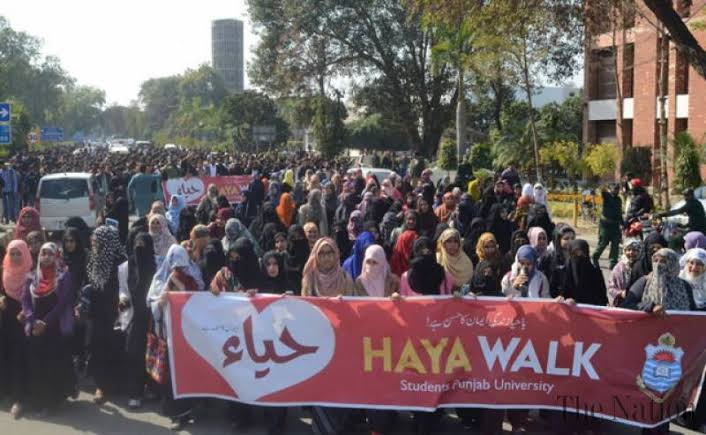
Students observing Haya Day, 14 February 2023

Rallies, seminars and other events are held in all major colleges and university campuses in the capital Islamabad, Karachi, Lahore, Gujranwala, Peshawar, Multan, Faisalabad, Quetta and other cities attended by students. Haya Day supporters have been criticized for opposing the romantic sentiments of Valentine's Day, holding that many in Pakistani "glorify violence" and "ridicule love".

Awareness stalls established across the country distribute literature advocating the organisation's views such as against Valentine's Day. One such stall was set up in Lower Mall near Government Islamia College, Civil Lines in Lahore where the student organisation played nasheeds on the topic of modesty.
