= Bajrang Dal =

Indian Hindutva militant organisation

- Logo of Bajrang Dal
- Leader: Pravin Togadia
- Founded: 8 October 1984, in Uttar Pradesh
- Dates active: 1984 – present
- Allegiance: Vishva Hindu Parishad
- Ideology: Hindutva; Hindu nationalism; Islamophobia; Anti-Christian sentiment; Anti-LGBTQ sentiment
- Political position: Far-right
- Status: Active

Bajrang Dal (lit. 'Brigade of Bajrangbali') is an Indian Hindutva militant organisation that forms the youth wing of the Vishva Hindu Parishad (VHP). It is a member of the Sangh Parivar, led by the Rashtriya Swayamsevak Sangh (RSS), a right-wing Hindutva paramilitary organisation. It was founded on 1 October 1984 in Uttar Pradesh, and began spreading more in the 2010s throughout India, although its most significant base remains the northern and central portions of the country.

The group runs about 2,500 akharas, similar to the shakhas (branches) of the RSS. The name "Bajrang" is a reference to the Hindu deity Hanuman. The Bajrang Dal opposes Muslim demographic growth, conversion to Christianity, cow slaughter, and alleged western influence in Indian culture.

== Ideology ==
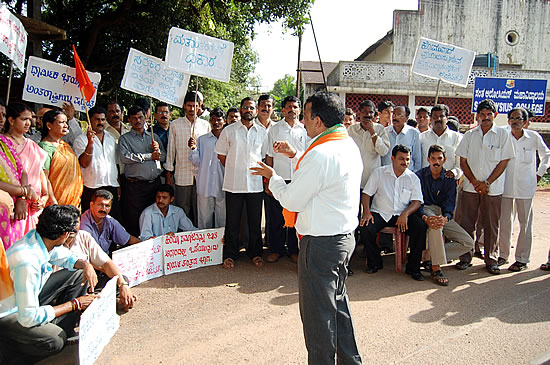
Bajrang Dal members protesting at St. Aloysius College, Mangaluru

Bajrang Dal is a right-wing organisation. Together with the Vishwa Hindu Parishad (VHP), the organisation has spoken out against Islamic terrorism in India and have announced that they will carry out awareness campaigns across the nation. They have claimed that Islamic terrorists are hiding among the general population in India and mean to expose them. Convener Prakash Sharma stressed that they were not targeting any particular community, but were trying to "wake up" the people of India, particularly its youth, to the dangers of terrorism in the light of the 2002 Akshardham Temple attack perpetrated by terrorists linked to the militant group Lashkar-e-Toiba. Bajrang Dal shares the VHP's position against cow slaughter and has supported proposals for banning it. The Gujarat branch is at the forefront of anti-beauty contest agitation. Another of its objectives is preventing Hindu-Muslim marriages.

== Social media presence ==
Bajrang Dal is active on social media. Facebook's security team has tagged it along with right wing organisations Sanatan Sanstha and Sri Ram Sena, as a potentially dangerous organisation that supports violence against minorities across India. Regardless the organisation has been allowed to spread on Facebook due to political and safety considerations. Facebook has avoided acting against Bajrang Dal as it has ties with the ruling Bharatiya Janata Party (BJP) and because "cracking down on Bajrang Dal might endanger both the company's business prospects and its staff in India", as reported by The Wall Street Journal, reaffirming its reportage earlier this year on the subject.

== Criticism, controversies, and militant activities ==
Bajrang Dal was banned in 1992 by the Rao government following the demolition of the Babri Masjid, but the ban was revoked one year later. Human Rights Watch (HRW) reported the involvement of Bajrang Dal during the 1998 attacks on Christians in southeastern Gujarat where dozens of Churches and Prayer halls were burnt down by Sangh Parivar outfits. According to HRW, Bajrang Dal had been involved in riots against Muslims in Gujarat in 2002.

In April 2006, two Bajrang Dal activists were killed in Nanded in the process of bomb-making. The same group of activists was also suspected of perpetrating the 2003 Parbhani mosque blasts. Those arrested told interrogators they wanted to avenge several blasts across the country. New Delhi Television Limited (NDTV) subsequently accused the police of a coverup in Nanded. A report by the Secular Citizen's Forum and People's Union for Civil Liberties (PUCL), Nagpur claimed to have found maps of mosques at the home of one of the deceased, on 24 August 2008 in Kanpur.

The VHP leader, Pravin Togadia, was arrested in April 2003 after distributing tridents to Bajrang Dal activists in Ajmer, defying a ban and prohibitory orders. He asserted that the coming Assembly polls in the Indian state of Rajasthan would be fought on the issue of tridents and attacked the ruling Indian National Congress Party for "placating" Muslims for electoral gains. He expressed satisfaction at the publicity received due to the incident.

The Bajrang Dal has been accused of not allowing Muslims to own land in parts of Gujarat by attacking traders who sell to Muslims, attacking Muslim homes and forcing the sale of the house or flat. This creates a ghettoisation of large cities in Gujarat, like Ahmedabad and Vadodara.

In June 2006, Bajrang Dal activists allegedly stormed a press meet, where 2 Christian rape victims were stating about their ordeal, accompanied by MP State Minorities Commission (MPSMC) member and prominent Christian leader Indira Iyengar. The district Convener Devendra Rawat had threatened the women about naming the right wing Hindu organisations, whose members were involved in the crime. In April 2017, Bajrang Dal members issued threats of rape and acid attacks against Assam based activist Bondita Acharya for condemning arrests of 3 people for possession of beef.

On several occasions, acting as "Social Police", the activists of Bajrang Dal have indulged in moral policing and harassed un-married couples on Valentine's Day and forced them to apply sindoor or tie rakhis against their wishes. The activists have often indulged in violence, invading gift shops and restaurants and threatening couples on Valentine's Day. Bajrang Dal activists have also targeted and moral policed women for wearing clothes like Bikini, Crop top, tube top, and sleeveless dresses, as they display vulgarity and are not a part of Indian culture.

In September 2008, a fresh wave of attacks in Karnataka were directed against the Newlife Christian churches and prayer halls by the Bajrang Dal as a protest against defaming Hindu gods and religious conversion carried on by the Newlife Missionaries. Later, convenor Mahendra Kumar was arrested even after he publicly announced that they were not responsible for the attacks after the Federal Government of India had strongly criticised the State Government. In addition, the National Commission for Minorities has also blamed them for the religious violence in the BJP-ruled states of Karnataka and Odisha. While some police reports claim that the Bajrang Dal was not involved per se and that the attacks were carried out by splinter groups, the testimonies of their activists showed exactly the opposite, as they described the attacks and openly warned of more violence.

On 24 January 2009, members of Sri Ram Sena, a Bajrang Dal affiliate, attacked young men and women after dragged them out of a pub in Mangalore. A group of 40 activists of the Sena barged into the pub "Amnesia — The Lounge" and beat up a group of young women and men, claiming the women were violating traditional Indian values. Two of the women were hospitalised. The video of the incident has become one of the most watched clips on YouTube, though how the TV crew happened to be ready at the 'unannounced' attack is not known.

Starting 14 February 2011, there was a fresh wave of violence directed at people celebrating Valentine's Day in Kanpur city, in the province of Uttar Pradesh. "Offenders", so called, are forced to hold their ears and do sit-ups as punishment for being caught celebrating the "Western holiday". Police were called in to calm the sectarian violence and discrimination.

On 2 November 2014, during the Kiss of Love protest against moral policing, members of Bajrang Dal, Shiv Sena, Vishwa Hindu Parishad and many other right wing groups opposed and attacked protestors and threatened to strip protestors for kissing on the streets. These opposing groups claimed that public display of affection is against both Indian culture and the law of the land (under section 294 of the Indian Penal Code), though according to the Supreme Court and the Delhi High Court, kissing in public is not a criminal offence. Police took many of the Kiss of Love protestors into custody to save their lives, but were blamed for giving a free hand to counter protestors of the right wing groups.

From 2015, Bajrang Dal and Vishwa Hindu Parishad have been accused of promoting and indulging in Cow vigilantism, apparently targeting Muslims and lower caste Hindus, mostly Dalits. Human rights groups have slammed several state Governments for promoting and supporting such acts, even turning a blind eye. Police officers have been threatened by members of cow protection groups for intervening in such cases or arresting cow vigilantes. Following the Una Flogging incident in July 2016 in Gujarat, where 4 dalits were brutally thrashed by Bajrang Dal goons and vigilantes when they were skinning dead cow carcasses, the victims converted to Buddhism. The conversion irked some perpetrators, who attacked the victims for the second time when they were out on bail.

Following the death of the Dalit victim and subsequent forced cremation by Uttar Pradesh Police officials in the Hathras rape and murder, Bajrang Dal faced media criticism and widespread condemnation for supporting the accused as they belonged to the higher caste Thakurs and issued threats to the kin of the victim to drop the case, which eventually reinforced their ideology of caste bigotry. Several Bajrang Dal activists joined expelled BJP MLA Rajveer Singh Pehelwan, who held a protest rally to support the accused, after they were arrested. Along with members of Bajrang Dal, members of the Vishva Hindu Parishad (VHP), Karni Sena, Kshatriya Mahasabha, Savarna Samaj Sangathan, and Rashtriya Savarna Sangathan also attended the protest in October 2020. On 7 October 2020, the Ex-BJP MLA and 100 others were booked by the UP Police for organising the rally. In April 2022, Bajrang Dal and Vishva Hindu Parishad activists clashed with Police Officers in Noida over the arrest of a rape accused.

Following the introduction of Prohibition of Unlawful Religious Conversion Ordinance, 2020 in Uttar Pradesh to curb Love Jihad, Bajrang Dal, acting as a parallel police force, has been condemned for stopping consensual inter-religious and inter-caste marriages. Bajrang Dal has also been slammed for supporting patriarchy and called for restricting freedom of women, particularly to the point of when they choose their partners out of caste and religion.

Days before Christmas, on 5 December 2020, Bajrang Dal leader Mithu Nath openly threatened and warned of beating Hindus for visiting Churches in Assam's Barak Valley. Following this, a case was filed against him by the Cachar district Deputy Commissioner of Police.

On 13 December 2021, Bajrang Dal spread violence in the congregation of a Hindu saint, some anti-social elements reached the gathering with sticks and guns and attacked unarmed people in which a person named Devi Lal Meena died.

In 2022, on the occasion of Valentine's Day, several members of the Bajrang Dal protested in Hyderabad and Agra. The militants were caught harassing couples in Agra.

Beginning 2022, members of the right-wing Hindutva groups in India have protested against the sale of Halal food in India. Bajrang Dal, Vishwa Hindu Parishad and other Hindutva groups were running door to door campaign in Karnataka, asking people not to purchase Halal meat. In March 2022 the Hindutva group Bajrang Dal physically attacked a Muslim meat seller. Five people were arrested in the incident.

On 15 August 2022, the eleven men sentenced to life imprisonment in the Bilkis Bano gangrape case, which occurred during the 2002 Gujarat riots, were released from a Godhra jail by the Gujarat government. Following their release, the rapists were allegedly greeted with garlands from members of Bajrang Dal and Vishva Hindu Parishad. The release and felicitation was criticised by several activists and members of opposition, and the release itself is controversial, because the convicts were released as per the old 1992 Remission Policy instead of the aggressive 2014 Policy. The challenge to release the rapists, which was pending in Supreme Court after a review petition was filed, was dismissed in December 2022, earning criticism from women's safety activists. The Supreme Court, however, redirected the Bombay High Court to look into the case. On 8 January 2024, the Supreme Court bench, led by Justices B.V. Nagarathna and Ujjal Bhuyan, reversed the Gujarat Government's decision and cancelled the remission, noting that the convicts were freed erroneously. In its judgement, the bench noted several frauds committed by one of the convicts Radheshyam Bhagwandas Shah, also known as Lala Vakil, who had filed the petition for remission, as he did not declare earlier remission petitions submitted to the Maharashtra State Government, as the trial was transferred to the High Court in Mumbai - the remissions were denied on the recommendation of CBI, as well as the magistrate and Superintendent of Police of Dahod, Gujarat. The Supreme Court eventually ordered the convicts to surrender within 2 weeks to carry out the remainder of their life sentences.

On 14 February 2023, Bajrang Dal activists were accused and criticised for intimidating couples across the nation against celebrating Valentine's Day, even physically attacking them. A few local citizens in Faridabad allegedly thrashed a few Bajrang Dal activists for attacking a couple sitting in a park, prompting police investigation.

On 16 February 2023, 2 Muslim men of Ghatmeeka village in Bharatpur district in Rajasthan, were abducted and burnt to death by Bajrang Dal members belonging to the neighbouring state of Haryana, on suspicion of cow smuggling. Though Bajrang Dal leaders denied the killings, 2 of the accused were found to be tied to the outfit. The main accused, Monu Manesar, accused of cow vigilantism, has been granted shelter from certain police officers of Haryana. The Haryana Government and State Police have been criticised for assisting the culprits, with Bajrang Dal activists attempting to stop Rajasthan Police from investigation and arrest of the accused.

On 2 March 2023, Bajrang Dal activists attempted to stop a women's night party in Shivamogga, Karnataka. The activists, who attempted to moral police the women's group, claimed that women taking part in such events are against "Hindu culture". Police were called to intervene and prevent any untoward incident.

The Bajrang Dal, along with Vishwa Hindu Parishad has been a major opponent of LGTBQ rights and describes homosexuality as mental disease. Several VHP activists have violently targeted LGBTQ parades across the country. Following the Supreme Court's judgement in April 2023 on same sex marriages, the VHP and Bajrang Dal welcomed the decision, calling it a Western attack on Indian culture.

Following the decision to add caste as a form of discrimination by the city of Seattle and the state of California in the United States in 2023, the leaders and supporters of Bajrang Dal's parent organisation Vishva Hindu Parishad criticised this decision and attempted to stop the legislations to pass the bill. The decision was taken after caste-based discrimination issues in Silicon Valley came to the surface in 2020 with a lawsuit by the State of California against Cisco Systems filed by the California Department of Fair Employment and Housing (DFEH, later named Civil Rights Department). The Department sued Cisco and two of its senior engineers for discrimination against a Dalit engineer (identified as "John Doe"), who alleged that he received lower wages and fewer opportunities because of his caste.

In the days leading up to the inauguration of the Ram Temple in Ayodhya, there were a number of incidents of violence and vandalism against minorities that were allegedly carried out by VHP and Bajrang Dal members. These groups, in their celebration, singled out religious minorities during the celebrations.

These incidents included:

- A clash between two groups in Mira Road, Maharashtra, which resulted in injuries
- A saffron flag being placed on top of a church in Madhya Pradesh
- A mob playing loud music and dancing near a mosque in Kodangal, Telangana
- A Muslim graveyard being set on fire in Bihar
- A Muslim man being forced to chant Hindu slogans in Maharashtra
- A right-wing Hindutva mob setting fire to a shop owned by a Muslim vendor as it conducted its rally from Daulatabad in Hathnoor mandal, Telangana.

On 2 February 2024, Police in Uttar Pradesh apprehended four individuals, including Monu Bishnoi, the Moradabad district president of the Bajrang Dal on charges related to cow slaughter, attempting to implicate a Muslim man in a fabricated case, and potentially hindering or conspiring against the police investigation. Bajrang Dal's Monu Bishnoi was in jail in an attempt to murder case. Post-release, Bishnoi engaged in illegal activities, attempting to manipulate the Chhajlait police station.

On 14 February 2024, the Bajrang Dal, along with Vishva Hindu Parishad, intimidated and targeted couples who were celebrating Valentines Day. Several activists and leaders threatened resort to violence if clubs, pubs and corporate hotels across Hyderabad did not cancel celebrations for Valentines Day. The activists instead asked the youngsters to pay tribute to the soldiers and service-members who were killed in the 2019 Pulwama attack, which was perpetrated by Pakistan-based terrorist group Jaish-e-Mohammed.

On 27 December 2024, the Bajrang Dal and Vishva Hindu Parishad demanded a ban on celebrating New Year celebrations.

On 13 February 2025, right before Valentines Day, Bajrang Dal activists engaged in moral policing against couples celebrating the western festival in Ghaziabad, Uttar Pradesh. The activists, who were armed with rods and sticks were intimidating and harassing couples by chanting "Jai Bajrangbali" and "Jai Shri Ram" (Meaning Hail Lord Hanuman and Hail Lord Ram). The act of moral policing was heavily criticised across several media outlets. To prevent any incidents of harassment and moral policing, the Jamshedpur Police in Bihar made elaborate security arrangements for couples.

In July 2025, several Bajrang Dal activists framed two nuns for trafficking; however, it was proven false after one tribal woman came forward saying the group coerced her. On 8 August 2025, two nuns from Kerala were attacked by Bajrang Dal members in Odisha. In December 2025, the group came under fire for targeting and attacking people across the country for celebrating Christmas.

On 16 January 2026, a Christian pastor in Odisha was attacked by a mob, which included members of Bajrang Dal, who tried to force him to chant Jai Shri Ram.

In January 2026 Kotdwar controversy, Bajrang Dal members took rallies and parades in Kotdwar, Uttarakhand, using warnings, slurs, and abusive language for a local gym trainer, who protected an elderly Muslim shopkeeper against harassment from the membersof the outfit. The incident led to communal tensions and police intervention, drawing national media attention.

== Reception ==
The US State Department's 2000 report on international religious freedom and 2000 World Report by the Human Rights Watch labelled this organisation as a Hindu extremist group. The US Central Intelligence Agency classified the Bajrang Dal and the VHP as religious militant organisations in the "India" entry of The World Factbook on 4 June 2018, but removed the mentions of the Bajrang Dal and the VHP from the entry by 25 June 2018.

The group has also been called "terrorist", with Torkel Brekke referring to it as the "best known among the terrorist groups controlled by the RSS". Paul Brass described the Bajrang Dal as an Indian equivalent of Nazi Germany's Sturmabteilung.

Former Indian Prime Minister Atal Bihari Vajpayee has called Bajrang Dal an embarrassment to the BJP and urged Rashtriya Swayamsevak Sangh (RSS) to "rein them in". After the religious violence in Odisha, the Bharatiya Janata Party Prime Ministerial candidate L. K. Advani advised the Bajrang Dal to cease association with violence, concerned with the fact that it took pressure off the UPA government in Delhi.

== Demand for ban ==
In September 2008, the Indian National Congress (INC) demanded a ban on the Bajrang Dal and the Vishva Hindu Parishad (VHP) which according to the INC are involved in anti-national activities. Congress spokesman Manish Tewari said "White paper should be brought out not only against SIMI "(Students Islamic Movement of India)" but all organisations involved in anti-national activities like Bajrang Dal and VHP". Congress spokesman Shakeel Ahmed said, "Those outfits involved in terrorist activity should be investigated, the question is why Bajrang Dal should not be banned". Muslim cleric Maulana Khalid Rashid Firangi Mahli, who is involved in the "Movement Against Terrorism", also demanded a ban on this organisation in the wake of the Kanpur blast.

The monthly magazine Communalism Combat started by civil rights activists Teesta Setalvad and Javed Anand demanded an immediate ban on the Bajrang Dal in August 2008.

Leader of the Lok Janashakti Party (LJP) Ramchandra Paswan describing the Bajrang Dal as communal organisation said, "Bajrang Dal and VHP should immediately be banned."

The Indian National Congress, Union Minister Ram Vilas Paswan, former prime minister H. D. Deve Gowda and Uttar Pradesh Chief Minister Mayawati have demanded a ban on Bajrang Dal and Sri Rama Sena. In this regard, Deve Gowda sent a letter to prime minister and accused Bajrang Dal "for perpetrating senseless violence" against minorities in Karnataka and Odisha.

On 5 October 2008, the NCM recommended a ban on the Bajrang Dal and VHP for its alleged role in the attacks on Christian institutions in Karnataka. However, the ruling state government has the Minority commission's recommendations and does not support this suggestion.

On 5 October 2008, the Indian Prime Minister called a special cabinet meeting to discuss a possible ban on the Bajrang Dal and the VHP over the continuing attacks on Christians and Christian institutions in Odisha and Karnataka.

Bajrang Dal was involved in the Graham Staines murder case in Odisha. In 2003, Bajrang Dal member Dara Singh was convicted of leading the murderers and was sentenced to life in prison. In 2019 Bajrang Dal's Odisha president at the time of the murders, Pratap Chandra Sarangi, was alleged to have been involved, which he strenuously denied, attributing the allegations to his political appointment.

== List of presidents ==
| | Name | Term |
|---|---|---|
| 1 | Vinay Katiyar | |
| 2 | Jaibhan Singh Pawaiya | |
| 3 | Suresh Jain | |
| 4 | Prakash Sharma | |
| 5 | Subash Chouhan | |
| 6 | Rajesh Pandey | |

== See also ==
- Babu Bajrangi
- Pratap Chandra Sarangi
- Dara Singh (Bajrang Dal)
- 2001 Odisha Assembly attack
- Hindu terrorism
