= Sri Ram Sena =

Indian Hindutva militant organisation

- Other name: SRS
- Founder: Pramod Muthalik
- Founded: 11 July 2005 (21 years ago)
- Headquarters: Karnataka
- Ideology: Hindutva
- Political position: Right-wing

The Sri Ram Sena (lit. 'Army of Rama'), or Shree Ram Sena, is an Indian right-wing Hindutva militant organisation. Founded and led by Pramod Muthalik, it has received media attention for its acts of vigilante moral policing, including the 2009 Mangalore pub attack.

== Ideology ==
The organisation is a right wing militia. It is considered to be aligned with Hindutva, a Hindu nationalist ideology.

== Formation ==
The Sri Ram Sena was founded and established on 11 July 2005 by Pramod Muthalik, a former member of the Bajrang Dal and Shiv Sena. In its early years, the organisation called itself Rashtriya Hindu Sena.

== Activities and accusations ==
=== 2006 ===
The group is mentioned in the charge sheet filed by the Maharashtra Police following the 2006 Malegaon blasts. In the transcript of a conversation, the prime accused, Prasad Shrikant Purohit, is heard praising the Shri Ram Sena and calling Pramod Muthalik its leader. Muthalik staunchly defended Pragya Singh Thakur, another of the accused, saying she was innocent. An investigation found that neither the Sri Ram Sena nor Muthalik were involved in the blasts. In an interview with Rediff.com, Muthalik said, "Look at the Hubli case where so many terrorists were arrested. These arrests helped in cracking a nationwide nexus of the Students Islamic Movement of India. It was our boys who gave information about these terrorists and on the basis of our information the police nabbed these anti-national elements."

=== 2008 ===
On 24 August 2008, the Sri Ram Sena vandalized an Exhibition of M F Hussain's paintings in Delhi. The exhibition had been organized by SAHMAT, an NGO, to protest against the exclusion of Husain's works from the concurrent India Art Summit.

On 27 October 2008, activists of the Sri Ram Sena ransacked the central office of the Samajwadi Party in New Delhi, in retaliation for defamatory comments alleged to have been made by the Samajwadi leadership against slain Delhi Police Inspector M C Sharma. Taking responsibility for the attack, the Sri Ram Sena's national general secretary Binay Kumar Singh told the Press Trust of India that he and his supporters had entered the premises of the Samajwadi Party office and damaged some vehicles parked inside, as well as furniture and hoardings.

=== 2009 ===
The members of the Sena attacked young men and women after dragging them out of a pub in Mangalore, on 24 January 2009. A group of 40 activists of the Sena barged into the pub "Amnesia — The Lounge" and beat up a group of young women and men, claiming the women were violating traditional Indian values. Two of the women were hospitalized. The video of the incident has become one of the most watched clips on YouTube, though how the TV crew happened to be ready at the 'unannounced' attack is not known. Commenting on the incident, founder Pramod Muthalik said "Whoever has done this has done a good job. Girls going to pubs is not acceptable. So, whatever the Sena members did was right. You are highlighting this small incident to malign the BJP government in the state."

In January 2009, Muthalik announced a plan to target couples found dating on 14 February, Valentine's Day. He said, "our activists will go around with a priest, a turmeric stub and a mangalsutra on 14 February. If we come across couples being together in public and expressing their love, we will take them to the nearest temple and conduct their marriage." On 9 February 2008, P. Chidambaram the Indian Minister of Home Affairs, said, "Sri Ram Sena is a threat to the country. The Centre is watching its activities with great concern".

Muthalik's remarks aroused widespread criticism and protests like the Pink Chaddi Campaign. As a precaution, Muthalik and 140 others of the Sri Ram Sena were held in preventive custody on Valentine’s Eve and released a few days later.

=== 2011 ===
On 12 October 2011 a few Sri Ram Sena activists allegedly assaulted senior lawyer and social activist Prashant Bhushan in his Supreme Court chamber. The Sena leadership denied any involvement. Police determined that the attackers were not from Sri Ram Sena.

The organisation's top aides were recorded on camera agreeing to vandalise an art exhibition in return for money in an undercover investigation by Tehelka.

=== 2012 ===
In January 2012, seven people were arrested in Bijapur, Karnataka, for raising Pakistan's national flag on a government building. They were charged with trying to create tension in the city, which has a sizeable Muslim population. According to the police, they were members of Sri Ram Sena, though the organization denied it.

=== 2018 ===
The right wing Sri Ram Sene has appealed to the people through social media sites to extend financial support to the family of Parshuram Ashok Wagmare, who is allegedly the man who pulled the trigger on journalist-activist Gauri Lankesh on 5 September last year. The appeal on Facebook has gone viral and triggered a controversy. Rakesh Math, president of the Vijayapura district unit of Sri Ram Sene, has posted the appeal, asking people to financially help the families of those arrested by the police in connection with the Gauri Lankesh murder case. He has urged the people to have a role in safeguarding the Hindu religion.

During a raid at Nallasopara on 10 August, the Anti-Terrorism Squad (ATS) had recovered several explosives and arrested Sri Ram Sena spokesperson Vaibhav Raut. The Maharashtra Anti-Terrorism Squad (ATS) Sanatan Sanstha and the Hindu Janajagruti Samiti in its charge sheet filed in the Nalasopara arms haul case on . All 12 including Vaibhav Raut accused arrested in the case where charged with plotting terror attacks in several cities and amassing explosives and weapons to execute the plan.

In the charge sheet filed before a special National Investigation Agency (NIA) court, the accused have been charged under various sections of the Unlawful Activities (Prevention) Act, the Indian Penal Code, the Arms Act and the Maharashtra Police Act.

=== 2019 ===
On 22 May 2019, activist of Sri Ram Sena Shubham Baghel along with his supporters assaulted and abused a Muslim man on suspicion of carrying beef in Seoni district of Madhya Pradesh. The activists also forced him to chant "Jai Shri Ram". On 23 May, sister of accused filed a First Information Report (FIR) against Shubham Baghel and others after a video has gone viral of the incident. The police had then arrested Shubham and his associates.

=== 2021 ===
On 5 October 2021, Belgavi Police arrested 10 people in connection to the murder of 24-year-old Muslim youth Arbaz Aftab Mullah. Those arrested include right-wing outfit Sri Ram Sene Hindustan's Taluk President Pundaleeka alias Maharaj and have been booked under IPC sections 302 (murder), 201 (evidence disappearing), 34 (criminal act), 341 (wrongful restraint), 120b (conspiracy), 384 (extortion). Mullah's beheaded body was found on railway tracks on 28 September.

=== 2022 ===
On 8 April 2022, Sri Ram Sene members wearing saffron shawls vandalised at least four pushcarts belonging to Muslims near the Sri Nuggikeri Hanumantha Temple. They threw hundreds of watermelons and coconuts on the road.

On 26 April 2022, Sri Ram Sena chief Pramod Muthalik while delivering a speech at an event in Bagalkote in Karnataka warned - "Not just in Karnataka, but in any corner of the country -- on Rama Navami, Hanuman Jayanti, Ganesh Chaturthi or on any festival -- if one stone is pelted, then 1,000 stones will be pelted on Muslims. God has also given us two hands, be warned,"

=== 2023 ===
Speaking at a public event in Karnataka’s Bagalkote, Muthalik said, "We are aware of the situation. I would like to invite the youth here. If we lose one Hindu girl, we should trap 10 Muslim girls. If you do so, Shri Ram Sena will take responsibility for you and provide every kind of security and employment."

On 17 March, Yadgir Karnataka Local Court on Friday held Sri Rama Sena state President Siddalinga Swamy, pontiff of Karuneshwara Mutt in Andola, guilty of hate speech. On 2 January 2015, Siddalinga Swami delivered a hate speech against Muslims at a public function organised by the Vishva Hindu Parishad at the Government Junior College Grounds in Yadgir.

=== 2025 ===
on August 3, 2025, three members of Sri Ram Sena were arrested for poison of 11 children at water tank.
