= Valentine's Day in Iran =

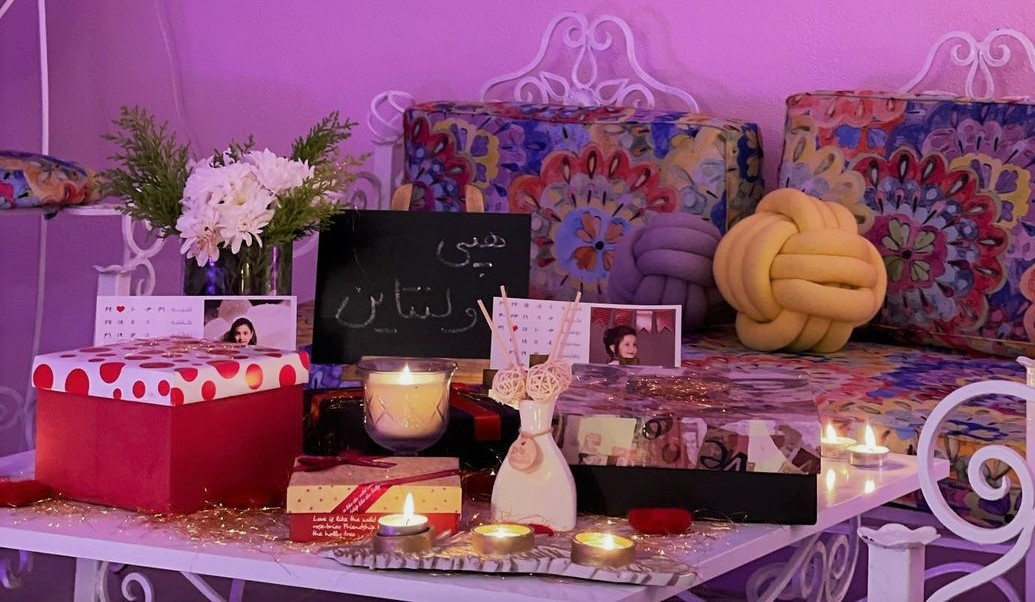
Part of a celebration of Valentine's Day in Tehran.

Since the mid-2000s, Valentine's Day has become increasingly popular in Iran, especially among young people. However, it has also been the subject of heavy criticism from conservatives, who see it as part of the spread of "decadent" Western culture. Since 2011, authorities have attempted to discourage celebrations and impose restrictions on the sale and production of Valentine's Day-related goods, although the holiday remains popular as of 2018. Additionally, there have been efforts to replace Valentine's Day with the ancient Persian festival of Sepandārmazgān, which takes place around the same time.

== Sepandarmazgan ==
Sepandarmazgan, or Esfandegan, is an ancient Persian festival honouring women and dedicated to Spenta Armaiti, a divine entity in Zoroastrianism associated with earth. Celebrated around late February and early March, it is also known as the Iranian Day of Love and marked by a feast and the exchanging of gifts between men and women. Since the 2000s, a desire to counteract the Western import of Valentine's Day has led to a renewed push to celebrate the holiday.

== History ==
The elite of Iran first became exposed to the concept of Valentine's Day in the mid-1980s with the opening of global communication channels, and it has become increasingly popular in Iran, especially among young people, since the mid-2000s. Conservatives in Iran, however, have harshly criticised the holiday as part of the encroachment of Western culture. In the run-up to Valetine's Day in 2011, authorities banned the production or distribution of gifts celebrating the holiday, such as teddy bears and items emblazoned with hearts or red roses, although enforcement was left to the discretion of individual police officers. Officially, goods related to Valentine's Day are banned as of 2016, while coffee shops and ice cream parlours have been informed by police that promoting "decadent Western culture through Valentine's Day rituals" will be considered a crime.

Experts have argued that attempts to ban Valentine's Day are likely to encourage young people to participate. As of 2018, the holiday remains popular despite restrictions.
