= Pramod Muthalik =

Indian Hindutva politician

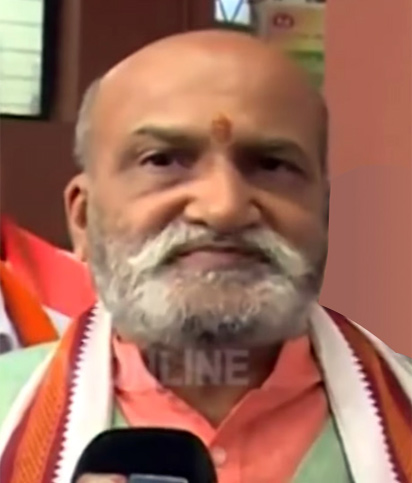
- Pramod Muthalik in 2022
- Born: 1963 (age 62–63); Hukkeri, Mysore State, India
- Known for: Founder of Sri Ram Sena, Rashtriya Hindu Sena

Pramod Muthalik (born 1963) is the chief of the Rashtriya Hindu Sena, the parent organisation of the Sri Ram Sena, a right-wing Hindutva militant organisation.

A member of the Bajrang Dal, a Hindutva militant organisation, in his early life, he formed the Karnataka unit of the Shiv Sena after being expelled from the Bajrang Dal. He quit Shiv Sena over the Belgaum border dispute, and then formed Sri Ram Sena. He gained media attention when around 40 activists of the Ram Sena barged into a Mangalore pub and attacked young men and women, insisting that these people were violating the traditional Indian values. The Bharatiya Janata Party (BJP) state government banned him from entering Mangalore, following which he campaigned against the party in the 2009 Lok Sabha elections. In March 2014, he joined the Karnataka unit of BJP, but was forced to quit within hours due to widespread criticism and protests from other members. He contested the 2014 Lok Sabha elections as an Independent Candidate from Bangalore South and Dharwad constituencies in Karnataka, but lost both.

== Hindutva ==
Muthalik was born in 1963 to a Brahmin family in Hukkeri in the Belgaum district of Karnataka. He joined the RSS in 1975. In 2004, he became the convenor for South India for the Bajrang Dal.

The cases are relating to making inflammatory speeches, inciting hatred between religious groups, conducting training with intent to carry out violence. Pramod Multhalik has over 45 cases pending against him, and is wanted by the police in 11 districts of Karnataka. Most of these cases are still under investigation and relate to subversive activities, defiling religious books, unlawful assembly, violating prohibitory orders, and evading judicial warrants. Most were filed between the years 2000 and 2008. On 19 February 2000, Muthalik spoke at Malebennur in Harihar taluk of Davanagere district. He remarked at minority communities and questioned their loyalty to the nation. The Harihar police filed a case under Section 153A of the Indian Penal Code. Two years later, the district magistrate banned his entry into Malebennur and surrounding areas. On 10 January 2002, he was banned from entering the Bailhongal taluk in relation to communal incidents in Kittur. The ban also included fellow Bajrang Dal leaders Vilas Pawar and Manoj Hanagal.

Muthalik is an admirer of Nathuram Godse, who assassinated Mahatma Gandhi and regularly attends an annual function in Pune to mark the death anniversary of Godse.

In 2022, he called for the economic boycott of Muslims following the 2022 Karnataka hijab row.

== Shiv Sena ==
In 2005, Muthalik was expelled from Bajrang Dal. Subsequently, in August 2005, he set up the Shiv Sena's Karnataka unit, stating that he wanted a political platform to advance the objectives of Hindutva. He was accompanied by the former district president of the Bajrang Dal for Belgaum, Vilas Pawar, and some 5,000 workers belonging to the Bajrang Dal, the Vishwa Hindu Parishad and the Bharatiya Janata Party. This marked the formation of the Shiv Sena in Karnataka. Muthalik quit the Sena in 2006 after the party revived its demand for the merger of the supposed claimed Marathi speaking areas in Karnataka like those in Belgaum, Uttara Kannada and Bidar district with Maharashtra. He then formed the Rashtriya Hindu Sena.

== Sri Ram Sena ==
After quitting Shiv Sena, Muthalik established Sri Ram Sena in 2006. In 2009, the Ram Sena men led an attack on a Mangalore pub, where women were beaten. Muthalik defended the attack saying that girls going to pub was against Indian culture. He also questioned the media and the government on their silence on the illegal Bangladeshi infiltrators.

Following the attack, the Bharatiya Janata Party (BJP) state government banned him from entering Mangalore. In response, he campaigned against BJP in the 2009 Lok Sabha elections, calling it "corrupt and anti-Hindu", but refused to contest the polls himself.

In 2014, he joined the Bharatiya Janata Party (BJP) Karnataka state unit, but was forced to exit in hours after protests from other members. After Goa's Chief Minister Manohar Parrikar banned his entry to the state, he said "BJP has become a Bharatiya Jesus Party".

In 2018, he along with 24 others were acquitted by the court from the charges related to 2009 Mangalore pub attack.

== Hate Speeches ==
=== 2015 ===
- Pramod Muthalik on October 10, 2015, in Hyderabad asked all Hindus to keep swords in their houses for "self protection" and to protect "our sister".

=== 2017 ===
- Sri Rama Sene chief Pramod Muthalik on October 8 urged Hindus to stop business with Muslims and to economically boycott them.

He said, “Muslims are opposing the construction of Rama Mandir at Ayodhya. They are also opposing the anti-cow slaughter bill. They don’t want to sing Vande Mataram. Until they stop opposing these, Hindus should stop economic activities with them,” he said during the Matr Pooja celebration in Mangaluru on Sunday.

=== 2018 ===
- Pramod Muthalik compared late Gauri Lankesh to a dog. On June 17, he said-"Two murders took place in Karnataka and two in Maharashtra in Congress rule. No one questioned Congress govt failure. Instead, they are asking why is PM Modi silent and not speaking on Gauri Lankesh’s death. Is Modi responsible even if any dog dies in Karnataka?"

=== 2022 ===
- On 26 April 2022, Sri Ram Sena chief Pramod Muthalik while delivering a speech at an event in Bagalkot in Karnataka warned - "Not just in Karnataka, but in any corner of the country -- on Ram Navami, Hanuman Jayanti, Ganesh Chaturthi or on any festival -- if one stone is pelted, then 1,000 stones will be pelted on Muslims. God has also given us two hands, be warned,"
- Pramod Muthalik on May 28 said in Karnataka, "We will take back all 30,000 temples which were demolished to build masjids. Stop us if you have the guts. You people warned of bloodshed during demolition of Babri Masjid. What happened to that? You couldn't take even a single drop of blood of Hindus."
- Pramod Muthalik on August 23,2022 had warned his workers will chop off the hands of those who try to put down the Hindutva ideologue’s posters. “If you touch Savarkar's poster, we will chop your hands off and throw it away. It’s a warning,”.

=== 2023 ===
- Addressing a Hindu convention on the occasion of Swami Vivekananda Jayanti at Yadravi town on January 12, he said that the sword should be displayed at homes in such a way that it can be clearly visible to all those who visit them.

Stating that police officials will not lodge any complaint if a sword is kept at home, he said that exhibiting the weapon is not meant to kill anyone, but to protect the women.

- Speaking at a public event in Karnataka’s Bagalkote, Muthalik said, “We are aware of the situation. I would like to invite the youth here. If we lose one Hindu girl, we should trap 10 Muslim girls. If you do so, Shri Ram Sena will take responsibility for you and provide every kind of security and employment.”
- On March 3, Controversial chief Sri Rama Sene in Karnataka Pramod Muthalik has slammed the BJP leaders in the state for seeking votes in the name of Prime Minister Narendra Modi. Ahead of the upcoming Karnataka assembly election, Muthalik, who was in Karwar, asked people to beat leaders of the Bharatiya Janata Party with slippers if they take Modi's name during the door-to-door campaign.
