= Caiga Quien Caiga =

Argentine television show

- Genre: Comedy; News; Talk show
- Presented by: Juan di Natale and Guillermo López (Argentina); Nicolás Larraín, Gonzalo Feito and Iván Guerrero Mena (Chile); Ana Milán, Silvia Abril and Tània Sarrias (Spain); Marcelo Tas, Marco Luque and Oscar Filho (Brazil); Daan Nieber, Beau van Erven Dorens and Pieter Jouke
- Country of origin: Argentina
- Original language: Spanish

Production
- Running time: 90 minutes (including commercials)
- Production company: Cuatro Cabezas

Original release
- Network: América (Argentina); Mega (Chile); Cuatro (Spain); Italia 1 (Italy); Band (Brazil); TVI (Portugal); Veronica (Netherlands)
- Release: 1995

Caiga Quien Caiga (Whoever May Fall), also known as CQC, is an Argentine television show. Under the format of the production company Cuatro Cabezas, CQC has also been adapted in Spain, France, Chile, Italy, Brazil, Portugal and briefly in Israel and the Netherlands.

It won an International Emmy for Best Non-Scripted Entertainment in 2010.

== Overview ==
CQC is a weekly news roundup that takes a humorous and ironic approach to reporting current affairs, show business and sports. CQC's reporters are known for asking politically incorrect questions to celebrities, which in some cases leads to visible discomfort in the interviewees.

One of the trademarks of the show is the heavy editing of the interviews to add cartoons and sound effects with the goal of highlighting (by ridicule) the interviewee's reactions. Reporters sometimes give controversial gifts to celebrities.

Hosts and reporters all dress in black suits and wear black glasses, inspired by the characters in Quentin Tarantino’s movie Reservoir Dogs.

The name of the show in Spanish is a commonly used phrase meaning "whatever it takes" (literally: "whoever might fall"), as a reference to the unorthodox interviewing methodology.

A recurring segment is "Proteste Ya" ("Protest Now"), which involves the people of a certain neighborhood or home area sending an e-mail to an e-mail address especially reserved for "Proteste Ya", complaining about government negligence in their neighborhood. The CQC journalists then go to that neighborhood, find out about the problem and try to force the person responsible to make a commitment to improve the situation, often taking something from their office as a "collateral".

== International versions ==
=== Argentina ===
The Argentine edition of CQC was hosted by Mario Pergolini, Eduardo de la Puente and Juan di Natale until 2009. The new anchor is Roberto Pettinato.

It started broadcasting in Canal 2 (currently known as América TV), in 1995. This first stage ended in 1999, with a special show transmitted live from the Gran Rex Theatre in Buenos Aires. In 2001, there was a special show (made in the same theatre) to announce the new season of the show for the next year, this time in Canal 13. In 2005, Canal 13 hired Marcelo Tinelli, who is frequently argumented in the programme and has been a longtime rival of Mario Pergolini. This resulted in CQC (and all of the shows produced by Cuatro Cabezas) moving to Telefe. The show went on the air every Monday at 10:30 pm (local hour). On 15 December 2008, Pergolini officially retired from the show.

The journalist cast in Canal 2 were Clemente Cancela, Andy Kusnetzoff, Guillermo López, Daniel Malnatti, Gonzalo Rodríguez and Daniel Tognetti. The cast in Canal 13 were Clemente Cancela, Diego Della Salla, Guillermo López, Daniel Malnatti and Gonzalo Rodríguez.

=== Chile ===
The Chilean edition started broadcasting in 2002 on Mega every Sunday at 10:00 pm. The hosts are Nicolás Larraín, Gonzalo Feito and Iván Guerrero. The journalist cast is composed of Sebastián Eyzaguirre, Jean Philippe Cretton and Pamela Le Roy, as well as the hosts Feito and Guerrero. Previously in the show were reporter Marcelo Arismendi, Fernando Lasalvia and hosts Felipe Bianchi and Pablo Mackenna. With the show being broadcast on a Christian channel, they are restricted from talking to people related to the church. The show is produced with the support of the Chilean production company Edu. Some of their most popular memes is El Hombre de Trabajo Trabajo y Trabajo and Eduardo Bonvallet. The last season on Mega was produced on 2011. After that, the Chilean edition has had sporadic special episodes on Chilevisión and YouTube sponsored by the mobile carrier WOM.

=== Spain ===
The Spanish version was broadcast by Telecinco from 1996 to 2008 (except in 2003 and 2004 when the show was cancelled), by La Sexta from May 2008 to December 2008, and by Cuatro in 2010. The first period (1996 to 2002) was produced by GloboMedia, while Cuatro Cabezas was in charge from 2002 to 2010.

In their first stage, the show was hosted by El Gran Wyoming. Some of the reporters (like Pablo Carbonell) were already experienced TV journalists, while the rest started their television careers in CQC such as Javier Martin and Arturo Valls. During this first run, the show featured a house band led by Wyoming's longtime collaborator Maestro Reverendo. Despite enjoying a high rating and the numerous awards given to the programme and its presenter, Telecinco decided to cancel the show at the end of 2002 alleging business reasons. On the weeks after the cancellation was announced, the program experienced a rise in its audience rating. The announcement was made after the reporters suggested to include a section about Ana Botella, wife of then-Prime Minister José María Aznar, although Telecinco claimed the cancellation's reasons were unrelated to that incident.

In 2005 the programme returned to Telecinco, this time hosted by Manel Fuentes, Arturo Valls, Eduardo Aldán and Deborah Ombres as the first woman in the cast. The good ratings made the show renew their contracts for a second season, hosted by Arturo Valls, Manel Fuentes and Juanra Bonet with the reporter cast of Toni Garrido, Fernando González (Gonzo) and Christian Gálvez, having also Arturo Valls as reporter. In the third season, Toni Garrido was replaced by Eugeni Alemany and Francisco Rodríguez was introduced after winning a contests of reporters; later Christian Gálvez left the programme for another projects in Telecinco and Maldo made his appearance in the team of reporters. Fuentes and Bonet returned to host the fourth season, which began in Autumn 2007, with Leandro Rivera replacing Arturo Valls.

In 2008, La Sexta bought the rights of the programme from rival channel Telecinco. This new period of the programme began on 14 May 2008 with many new faces, as some of the old hosts and reporters had a contract with Telecinco (like Manel Fuentes) or decided to leave for another projects (like Gonzo). The host in this period was Frank Blanco, a radio presenter, accompanied by Juan Ramón Bonet and Toni Garrido, who come back to the show after two seasons. Estíbaliz Gabilondo, the comical duo Niño y Fox and Miguel Martín were the new reporters. The show was cancelled in December 2008 after 17 episodes because of low ratings.

In 2010, TV channel Cuatro decided to pick up the format with a female trio of presenters. The host in this new period were Ana Milán, Silvia Abril and Tània Sarrias. Premiering in April 2010, the show was canceled in August due to low ratings.

In January 2025, Telecinco revived the show once again, with a new trio of presenters made up of Santi Millán, Lorena Castell and Pablo González Batista. Pablo Carbonell rejoined the show as a reporter on the second episode of this run. However, this run was canceled in February due to low ratings, its last episode scheduled to air on 2 March.

=== Italy ===
The Italian version is called Le Iene, which is the Italian title of Tarantino's movie Reservoir Dogs. It started in 1996, currently transmitting on Italia 1.

=== France ===
There has been an edition of CQC as "Les Hyènes" in France, transmitting on France 2.

=== Israel ===
The Israeli edition of CQC aired in 2001, but was cancelled after one season for low ratings. The lack of success is attributed to the heavy competition by other satirical shows already established.

=== Brazil ===
The Brazilian edition of CQC is called Custe o Que Custar ("Whatever it Takes") and is aired on Rede Bandeirantes (Band) on Monday nights (10:15 PM, Brazilian time) and repeated on Saturdays (12:00 AM, same time zone) from 17 March 2008 to 28 December 2015. The show is hosted by Marcelo Tas, Marco Luque and Oscar Filho (nicknamed the Pequeno Pônei (Little Pony) of the team, due to his short stature), and its journalist crew is also comprised by Felipe Andreoli, Rafael Cortez, Monica Iozzi (who won the contest Quem quer ser o 8º integrante do CQC? - "Who Wants To Be The 8th Member Of CQC?"), joined by Maurício Meirelles in late 2011 and Ronald Rios in 2012.

Meirelles and Rios entered the show as replacements to former co-host Rafinha Bastos (who took a leave from the show after making an inappropriate joke about singer Wanessa's pregnancy, being subsequently dismissed by Band following revile from the media; he would go on to present the short-lived Brazilian version of Saturday Night Live on RedeTV!, as well as his own show on cable channel FX) and Danilo Gentili (formerly known as "the unexperienced reporter"), who left to star on his own project in Band, the talk show Agora é Tarde ("Now It's Too Late"), which in its last year (2014) was helmed by Bastos while Gentili left for SBT, where he presents another talk show in the same mold, The Noite com Danilo Gentili, which is still airing as of October 2024. In later years, as the reporters became bigger media figures and got scoped out by other networks, the show's turnover rate increased, with actor Dan Stulbach replacing Marcelo Tas in the show's final year.

=== United States ===
A pilot for an American version of the show was filmed in Argentina with Dominic Monaghan, Zach Selwyn and Greg Giraldo as hosts. Clips of the pilot and interviews of the hosts (and Monaghan's girlfriend Evangeline Lilly) were aired on the 23 June 2008 episode of the Argentine show.

=== Portugal ===
The Portuguese version of the show, Caia Quem Caia, premiered on TVI on 25 October 2008. The show was fronted by Pedro Fernandes, José Pedro Vasconcelos, and Joana Cruz. Additional field reporting was done by João Santos, Miguel Rocha, and Filipe Cardoso. The show's regular slot was Saturday nights, although it occasionally got bumped to the following evening. The first series ended on 17 January 2009, with no indication that it would come back in the future.

=== Netherlands ===
A Dutch adaptation of CQC was broadcast since August 2009 on Veronica, and was presented by Dutch TV presenters Beau van Erven Dorens, Pieter Jouke and Daan Nieber. It ended on 5 April of the following year.

| Country | Name | Host(s) | TV Channel | First episode | Last episode |
|---|---|---|---|---|---|
| Argentina (original format) | Caiga quien caiga | Mario Pergolini, Eduardo de la Puente and Juan di Natale (1995-1999, 2001-2008); Ernestina Pais and Gonzalo Rodríguez (2009-2011); Juan di Natale and Guillermo López with Darian Schijman (2012); Roberto Pettinato, Clemente Cancela and Diego Iglesias (2013-2014) | América TV (1995-1999, 2012); Telefe (2006-2011); El Trece (2001-2005, 2013-2014) | 14 April 1995 | 17 September 2014 |
| Brazil | Custe o Que Custar | Marcelo Tas (2008-2014); Marco Luque (2008-2015); Rafinha Bastos (2008-2011); Oscar Filho (2012-2013); Dani Calabresa (2014); Dan Stulbach (2015); Rafael Cortez (2015) | Rede Bandeirantes | 17 March 2008 | 17 December 2015 |
| Chile | Caiga quien caiga | Nicolás Larraín (2002-2011); Sebastián Eyzaguirre (2017-2018) | Mega (2002-2011); Chilevisión (2017-2018) | 27 October 2002 | June 2018 |
| France | CIA : Club de l'info amateur | Arthur and Dominique Farrugia | TF1 | 2001 | 2001 |
| France | Les Hyènes | Caroline Diament | France 2 | 5 July 2004 | 23 August 2004 |
| Israel | CQC | ? | ? | 2001 | 2001 |
| Italy | Le iene Le iene Show | Simona Ventura with Peppe Quintale and Dario Cassini (1997); Simona Ventura with Fabio Volo and Andrea Pellizzari (1998-2001); Alessia Marcuzzi with Luca e Paolo and Claudio Bisio (2001); Alessia Marcuzzi with Luca e Paolo (2002); Alessia Marcuzzi with Luca e Paolo and Enrico Bertolino (2002); Alessia Marcuzzi with Luca e Paolo (2003); Alessia Marcuzzi with Luca e Paolo, Luciana Littizzetto, Daria Bignardi, Elisabetta Canalis, Natasha Stefanenko, Kasia Smutniak, Ilary Blasi, Afef, Alena Šeredová, Fernanda Lessa, Mago Forest and the Gialappa's Band (2004); Alessia Marcuzzi with Luca e Paolo (2004); Alessia Marcuzzi with Luca e Paolo and Luciana Littizzetto (2005); Alessia Marcuzzi with Luca e Paolo (2005); Cristina Chiabotto with Luca e Paolo (2006); Ilary Blasi with Luca e Paolo (2007-2008); Ilary Blasi with Fabio De Luigi, Pierfrancesco Favino and Marco Simoncelli (2008); Ilary Blasi with Luca e Paolo (2009-2011); Ilary Blasi with Enrico Brignano and Luca Argentero (2011); Ilary Blasi with Enrico Brignano, Alessandro Gassman, Pippo Baudo and Claudio Amendola (2012); Ilary Blasi with Teo Mammucari and the Gialappa's Band (2013-2015); Ilary Blasi with Teo Mammucari and the Trio Medusa (2015); Geppi Cucciari with Fabio Volo, Miriam Leone, Pif, Nadia Toffa and Simona Ventura (2016); Ilary Blasi with Frank Matano, Paolo Calabresi, Andrea Agresti, Matteo Viviani, Giulio Golia, Nadia Toffa and Giampaolo Morelli (2016); Ilary Blasi with Teo Mammucari, Paolo Calabresi, Andrea Agresti, Matteo Viviani, Giulio Golia and Nadia Toffa (2017); Ilary Blasi with Teo Mammucari, Paolo Calabresi, Andrea Agresti, Matteo Viviani, Giulio Golia and Nadia Toffa (2017); Ilary Blasi with Teo Mammucari, Paolo Calabresi, Andrea Agresti, Matteo Viviani, Giulio Golia, Nadia Toffa and Frank Matano (2018); Alessia Marcuzzi with the Gialappa's Band, Nicola Savino, Filippo Roma, Matteo Viviani, Giulio Golia and Nadia Toffa (2018-2019); Alessia Marcuzzi with the Gialappa's Band, Nicola Savino, Filippo Roma, Matteo Viviani, Giulio Golia, Nina Palmieri, Veronica Ruggeri and Roberta Rei (2019-2021); Elodie, Rocío Muñoz Morales, Elisabetta Canalis, Madame, Michela Giraud, Elena Santarelli, Francesca Fagnani, Federica Pellegrini, Iva Zanicchi, Lodovica Comello, Paola Egonu, Gialappa's Band, Nicola Savino, Filippo Roma, Matteo Viviani, Giulio Golia, Nina Palmieri, Veronica Ruggeri and Roberta Rei (2021); Belén Rodríguez with Teo Mammucari, Max Angioni and Eleazaro Rossi (2022-2023); Belén Rodríguez with Max Angioni, Eleazaro Rossi and Nathan Kiboba (2023); Veronica Ruggeri with Max Angioni, Eleazaro Rossi and Nathan Kiboba (2023-2026); Veronica Gentili with Vincenzo Comunale, Daniele Gattano, Carmine Del Grosso and Nathan Kiboba (2026–present) | Italia 1 | 22 September 1997 | present |
| Netherlands | Caiga Quien Caiga | Beau van Erven Dorens, Pieter Jouke and Daan Nieber | Veronica | 28 August 2009 | 5 April 2010 |
| Portugal | Caia Quem Caia | José Pedro Vasconcelos, Pedro Fernandes and Joana Cruz | TVI | 25 October 2008 | 17 January 2009 |
| Spain | Caiga quien caiga | El Gran Wyoming, Javier Martín and Juanjo de la Iglesia (1996-2002); Manel Fuentes, Arturo Valls, Eduardo Aldán and Deborah Ombres (2005); Arturo Valls, Manel Fuentes and Juanra Bonet with Toni Garrido, Gonzo and Christian Gálvez (2005-2006); Arturo Valls, Manel Fuentes and Juanra Bonet (2006-2007); Leandro Rivera, Manel Fuentes and Juanra Bonet (2007-2008); Juanra Bonet, Frank Blanco and Toni Garrido (2008); Ana Milán, Silvia Abril and Tània Sàrrias (2010); Santi Millán, Lorena Castell and Pablo González Batista (2025) | Telecinco (1996-2002, 2005-2008, 2025); La Sexta (2008); Cuatro (2010) | 10 May 1996 | 2 March 2025 |
| United States | Caiga quien caiga | Dominic Monaghan, Greg Giraldo and Zach Selwyn | None | Pilot filmed in 2008 | |
