= Custe o Que Custar =

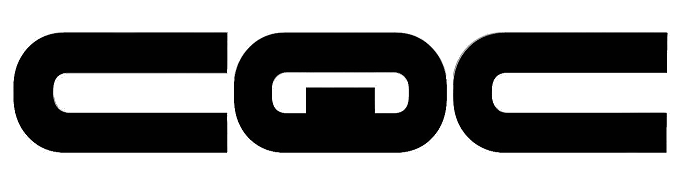
- Genre: News/comedy
- Created by: Diego Guebel; Mario Pergolini
- Directed by: Gonzalo Marco
- Presented by: Dan Stulbach (2015); Marco Luque (2008–2015); Rafael Cortez (2015); Former: Marcelo Tas (2008–2014); Rafinha Bastos (2008–2011); Oscar Filho (2012–2013); Dani Calabresa (2014)
- Opening theme: "Electric Head, Pt.1 (Satan In High Heels Mix)" –White Zombie "Shoot to Thrill" –AC/DC
- Ending theme: "Funky Mama" –Danny Gatton
- Country of origin: Brazil
- Original language: Portuguese
- No. of seasons: 8
- No. of episodes: 399

Original release
- Network: Band
- Release: March 17, 2008 – December 21, 2015

Custe o Que Custar (English: Whatever It Takes, represented by the acronym CQC) was a program that brought together journalism and humor on Brazilian television, produced by Eyeworks and broadcast weekly by Rede Bandeirantes from 2008 to 2015.

In total, it had eight seasons and 339 episodes. The format is based on the original Argentinean Caiga quien caiga, created by Mario Pergolini and Diego Guebel, in 1995. The attraction was awarded in several categories with the main awards on Brazilian television, such as the APCA, Press Trophy and the Brasil Quality Art Award.
