= Algo habrán hecho por la historia argentina =

- Actors Pablo Cedrón (as José de San Martín) and Marcelo Savignone (as Manuel Belgrano) represent the Posta de Yatasto, while Felipe Pigna and Mario Pergolini watch it from the background and act as if they were among it.
- Genre: Documentary
- Starring: Felipe Pigna; Mario Pergolini
- Country of origin: Argentina
- Original language: Spanish
- No. of seasons: 3
- No. of episodes: 12

Production
- Production company: Cuatro Cabezas

Algo habrán hecho (por la historia argentina) (in Spanish, "They must have done something (for the history of Argentina)) is a documentary television series that narrates the history of Argentina. It was created by the Argentine historian Felipe Pigna, who acted as presenter. In the first two seasons Mario Pergolini was a co-presenter of it, but after giving up on all works on television his role in the documentary was taken by Juan Di Natale. Di Natale and Pergolini were by that time co-presenters (as well as Eduardo de la Puente) of the talk show Caiga quien caiga. Di Natale pointed that he was not meant to act as if he was Pergolini, but the script writers wrote instead the scripts based on his own personality.

The first season, aired in 2005 on Canal 13, narrates the history of Argentina from the British invasions of the Río de la Plata to the fall of Juan Manuel de Rosas during the Battle of Caseros. The second season, aired in 2006 on Telefé, resumes the narration from that point and continues up to the suicide of Leandro N. Alem in 1896. The third one, aired in 2008 on Telefé, resumes as well from the end of previous season and ends with the meeting of Juan Domingo Perón and Eva Duarte at the Luna Park during a fund-raising to help after the San Juan earthquake.

The documentary uses 3 main styles, jumping from one to the other. One style is the use of actors to represent certain key events or circumstances. A second style is the plain explanation of the things taking place (which could be done by a narrating voice and visual gags, by the presenters in some modern day location, or by the presenters at a representation of an event), and a third style was some limited interaction of the presenters with the historical characters portrayed or the social circumstances depicted. The third season had fewer historical reconstructions than the others, and more explanations by Pigna and Di Natale.

The documentary earned two Martín Fierro Awards and one Clarin award.
