= Arismendi =

Arismendi (Basque for mountain of oaks) may refer to:

== People ==
- Arismendi (surname)

== Places ==
- Arismendi Municipality (disambiguation), several places in Venezuela
  - Arismendi Municipality, Barinas
  - Arismendi Municipality, Nueva Esparta
  - Arismendi Municipality, Sucre

== See also ==
- Arizmendi, a surname
