= La Caneli =

Spanish drag artist

La Caneli, stage name of Alberto Fernández, is a Spanish drag queen, educator, and presenter. She was a contributor on the La Sexta TV show Más vale sábado and is the host of the podcasts ¡Ay, la Caneli! and Canelis & Dragonas.

== Early life ==
Caneli came out as a gay man between the ages of 19 and 20, unable to live any longer in tension, hiding her identity out of fear.

During her youth, she found refuge in the representation of LGBT characters in film and television, citing as references movies such as Brokeback Mountain and The Rocky Horror Picture Show. This connection led her to more professionally dedicate herself to the dissemination of LGBT cinema.

== Career ==
La Caneli began her drag art career by experimenting with gender in private, trying on clothes traditionally associated with women. However, she did not discover drag until 2007, after seeing Las Fellini perform live.

In July 2023, she was interviewed by Cadena SER along with internet personality Esty Quesada, in a conversation focused particularly on underground culture and the filmography of John Waters.

In September of the same year, La Caneli was announced as a regular contributor to the show Más vale sábado on La Sexta, with a recurring weekly segment. She compared this moment to what happened in Spain two decades earlier, when drag artist Deborah Ombres also appeared on mainstream shows and media. During her segment in the show’s first episode, she was joined by fellow drag queens Diana Dardo and La Sorny. After filming the first episode of the show, which included outdoor scenes, La Caneli and her colleagues were victims of a homophobic attack, which required police intervention. A passerby hurled insults and slurs such as “disgusting”, “son of a bitch”, and “faggot” at them, as seen in a video that went viral on social media.

== Filmography ==
=== Film ===
Year	Title	Role	Notes
2021	La revolución bailando	Herself	Documentary
2022	Juan Carlos	Drag Queen	Short film

=== Television ===
Year	Title	Role	Notes
2022	Pride	Herself	1 episode
2023	Más vale sábado	Contributor	1 episode

== Podcast ==
Year	Title	Role	Notes
2019–2024	¡Ay, la Caneli!	Host	79 episodes
2021–2024	Canelis & Dragonas	Host	32 episodes
