= Arismendi (surname) =

Basque surname

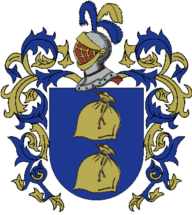
- Coat of Arms
- Language: Basque

Origin
- Meaning: "mountain of oaks"
- Region of origin: Basque Country

Other names
- Variant form: Arizmendi

Arismendi (short form: Arisme) is a Basque surname, formed from aritz (oak) + mendi (mountain), and thus meaning "mountain of oaks". The Basque people are indigenous to the area of northeast Spain and southwest France, a historical region known as the Basque Country.

== History ==
A branch of the family immigrated to Latin America. One of the first to do so was probably Juan Bernardo de Arismendi, who was from Fuenterrabía, Spain. He immigrated to present-day Venezuela, and was commander of the fortress in Araya during the second half of the 17th century. Through him, the Arismendi family became one of the most prominent families in Venezuela, and many historical figures in Venezuelan history derive from the family.

== People with the surname Arismendi ==
- Martín de Ursúa Arismendi, Count of Lizárraga and Castillo, Spanish conquistador, Governor-General of the Philippines
- Joan Josep Hervás i Arizmendi, modernist Catalan architect; municipal architect of Sitges, Tortosa and Manila, Philippines
- José María Arizmendiarrieta, Founder of Mondragon
- Daladier Arismendi (1975–2014), better known as Dala, was the founder of the Colombian reggae group Alerta Kamarada
- Daniel Arismendi, Venezuelan footballer
- Diego Arismendi, Uruguayan footballer
- Fernando Arismendi, Uruguayan footballer
- Helena Arizmendi (1927–2015), Argentine opera singer
- Juan Bautista Arismendi, Venezuelan patriot and general of the Venezuelan War of Independence
- Juan Bernardo Arismendi, Venezuelan real estate developer
- Luisa Cáceres de Arismendi (1799–1866), heroine of the Venezuelan War of Independence
- Marcelo Arismendi, Chilean journalist and television presenter
- Marina Arismendi, Uruguayan senator and minister of social development
- Rodney Arismendi, former Secretary-General of the Communist Party of Uruguay
- Rodolfo Loero Arismendi, Venezuelan founder of the first chemical industrial school in Caracas and of the University Institute of Industrial Technology Rodolfo Loero Arismendi
- Margot Arismendi Amengual, Venezuelan wife of architect Carlos Raúl Villanueva
- Yanina Angelini Arismendi, Uruguayan painter, gallerist and social justice activist living in the USA

== See also ==
- Arizmendi
- Harizmendi
