= Awka Liwen =

- Directed by: Mariano Aiello; Kristina Hille
- Written by: Mariano Aiello; Osvaldo Bayer; Kristina Hille
- Screenplay by: Mariano Aiello Kristina Hille
- Produced by: Mariano Aiello
- Starring: Osvaldo Bayer; Norberto Galasso; Diana Lenton; Felipe Pigna
- Cinematography: Mariano Aiello Kristina Hille
- Edited by: Mariano Aiello Kristina Hille, Asistents Ramiro Chacón; Pablo Noé
- Distributed by: Macanudo Films
- Release date: 9 September 2010
- Country: Argentina
- Languages: Spanish; Mapudungun

Awka Liwen (“Rebellion at Dawn”) is a documentary film directed by Mariano Aiello and Kristina Hille, with a script by Osvaldo Bayer, Mariano Aiello and Kristina Hille. The work develops the history of the possession of the land in Argentina. It is also a history of racism against the indigenous peoples, where racism was the alibi for their exploitation and elimination. Awka Liwen, which in the Mapuche language means “Rebel at Dawn”, was filmed in Chubut, Jujuy, Río Negro, the province and city of Buenos Aires and Germany.

== Pre-screening ==
The pre-screening of the work was in November 2009 in the National Library of Buenos Aires. The premiere of the film took place in the Cinema Gaumont, the traditional movie theatre in the city of Buenos Aires, where around 3000 people came.

== Awards and honors ==
Awka Liwen received several awards at Argentine and international film festivals. In 2011, it won first prize in the Argentine Official Competition at the International Political Film Festival (FICIP) in Buenos Aires.

The same year, the film won Best Documentary in the international competition of the sixth Video Festival Imperia — International Festival of Digital Cinematographic Art — in Italy. The 2011 edition of the festival was held under the patronage of UNESCO, granted in connection with the festival's activities promoting cultural diversity.

Awka Liwen also received first prize in the feature documentary and fiction category at the 2011 Mercosur Scientific Film and Video Festival (CINECIEN), held at the National Library of the Argentine Republic.

At the sixth edition of the Italian festival Un Film per la Pace, it received a special distinction in the category of feature films recommended for use in schools.

At the 10th Tandil Film Festival, the film received the El Sombrerito award, granted by inmates of Unit No. 37 at Barker as part of the festival's Cine en Barker program.

The film was also screened or selected at several international festivals, including the 17th Mostra de Cinema Llatinoamericà de Catalunya in Lleida, the Ischia Film Festival in Italy, the Globale Film Festival in Uruguay, and the fourth International Documentary Film Festival (FESTIDOC) in Paraguay.

=== Institutional recognition ===
Before its release, the documentary project was declared to be of "National Interest" by the General Secretariat of the Presidency of Argentina through Resolution No. 992/2008, adopted on 25 August 2008 and published in the Boletín Oficial on 29 August 2008.

The Argentine Chamber of Deputies also approved, without amendments, Resolution File No. 1993-D-2008, declaring the documentary to be of interest to the Chamber.

The project received further declarations and institutional support from several Argentine public bodies. Decree No. 4049/2009 of the Government of the Province of Salta, which declared the documentary to be of provincial interest, listed among its antecedents its declaration of cultural interest by the national Secretariat of Culture; social interest by the Ministry of Social Development; interest to the Ministry of Science, Technology and Productive Innovation through Resolution No. 737/08; educational and cultural interest by the General Directorate of Culture and Education of the Province of Buenos Aires; and institutional sponsorship by the National Institute of Indigenous Affairs through Resolution No. 615/07. The decree also recorded support from the National Endowment for the Arts, the Government of Chubut Province, the Municipality of Rosario, and the Argentine Chamber of Deputies.

== Legal controversy ==
In 2011, José Alfredo Martínez de Hoz Jr. and Alejandro Martínez de Hoz brought legal proceedings against Macanudo Films, Osvaldo Bayer, Mariano Aiello and Felipe Pigna over references to the Martínez de Hoz family contained in Awka Liwen. The plaintiffs sought the removal from the film of oral and written references and images relating to their family, as well as the suspension of its exhibition, distribution and dissemination until those changes were made.

The lawsuit received public attention and prompted expressions of support for Bayer and the filmmakers from social organizations, trade unions, human-rights groups and representatives of Indigenous peoples.

On 29 December 2015, National Civil Court No. 107 dismissed the action brought by the Martínez de Hoz brothers. Following appeals, Chamber M of the National Civil Court of Appeals upheld the dismissal on 3 May 2016. In its decision, the court referred to the constitutional protection of freedom of thought and expression and held that the exceptional circumstances required to justify the restrictions requested by the plaintiffs had not been established.

The proceedings later became the point of departure for the documentary Martínez de Hoz, directed by Aiello and narrated by Bayer, which premiered in 2017 at the MALBA.
