= Mariano Aiello =

Argentine filmmaker and lawyer

- Aiello in 2025
- Occupations: Film director, producer, screenwriter, lawyer
- Known for: Awka Liwen, Martínez de Hoz

Mariano Aiello is an Argentine film director, producer, screenwriter and lawyer. He is best known for co-directing the documentary film Awka Liwen (2010) with German filmmaker and political scientist Kristina Hille. The film was written by Aiello, Hille and Argentine historian and writer Osvaldo Bayer.

La Nación has described Aiello as a filmmaker and lawyer specializing in Indigenous rights. His documentary work has dealt with Indigenous peoples, human rights, land ownership, political and economic history, migration and environmental issues.

== Career ==
Aiello worked on human-rights, Indigenous-rights and audiovisual projects in Guatemala. In a 2011 interview with the Argentine newspaper El Litoral, he said that from 1996 he had participated in programmes connected with the Guatemalan peace process and the strengthening of democratic institutions.

Aiello subsequently collaborated with German political scientist and filmmaker Kristina Hille. Página/12 reported that they met while working in Guatemala, where they participated in projects related to democracy and labour conditions and began making audiovisual works about the country's social conditions. Their collaboration led to the creation of the production company Macanudo Films.

=== Early documentary work ===
During the mid-2000s, Aiello and Hille made documentaries examining mining projects and their effects on Indigenous communities and the environment in Guatemala. The World Rainforest Movement identified them as the filmmakers of documentaries about the Marlin open-pit gold project and the Fénix nickel project in Maya territory.

Explotación de níquel en tierras mayas: Proyecto Fénix was also screened in Switzerland in 2006 in an event organised in connection with Peace Brigades International. The programme identified Hille and Aiello as the film's directors and described its focus on the proposed reopening of a nickel mine in Q'eqchi' Maya territory around Lake Izabal.

Aiello and Hille also made Uruguay natural y el Consenso de Washington, a documentary filmed in Uruguay about industrial forestry, eucalyptus plantations and pulp production. In 2006, the film received a special mention at the Mercosur Scientific Film and Video Festival, CINECIEN. The Uruguayan newspaper El País reported on the film and identified Aiello and Hille as its filmmakers.

The catalogue of the 2011 International Political Film Festival also credited Aiello with earlier works including the fiction short Truco, the documentaries Migración temporal guatemalteca a Canadá and Piqueteros, the two Guatemala mining documentaries and Uruguay natural y el Consenso de Washington.

In 2009, Página/12 reported that Aiello and Hille were also working on Rigoberta, la hija del tiempo, a documentary project involving Guatemalan Indigenous leader and Nobel Peace Prize laureate Rigoberta Menchú. The newspaper reported that the screenplay was by Menchú. The 2011 FICIP catalogue subsequently listed the film as being in post-production.

=== Awka Liwen ===
Aiello and Hille directed Awka Liwen (Mapudungun for "Rebel Dawn"), a documentary written with Osvaldo Bayer examining the history of Indigenous dispossession, land ownership and economic inequality in Argentina.

The film was previewed at the National Library of the Argentine Republic in Buenos Aires in November 2009. It was released theatrically in Argentina in September 2010 and received reviews and extensive coverage in the Argentine press.

Página/12 reported that the film had been declared of National Interest by the Presidency of Argentina.

In 2012, Awka Liwen had its North American premiere as part of the Latinbeat programme at the Film Society of Lincoln Center in New York. Aiello attended a screening and discussion in person.

=== Legal dispute over Awka Liwen ===
In 2011, descendants of the Martínez de Hoz family brought legal proceedings related to statements and historical material contained in Awka Liwen. The dispute involved Bayer, Aiello and historian Felipe Pigna and received coverage from Argentine media and Reporters Without Borders.

In July 2016, Página/12 reported that Argentina's National Civil Court of Appeals had rejected the claim against the filmmakers and other participants in the documentary.

=== Martínez de Hoz ===
Aiello subsequently directed the documentary Martínez de Hoz, which developed out of his research and the legal dispute surrounding Awka Liwen. The film, narrated by Bayer, examines the historical and political role of the Martínez de Hoz family in Argentina.

The documentary was theatrically released in Argentina in 2017. Argentina's public educational television channel Canal Encuentro later included Martínez de Hoz in its documentary programming, crediting Aiello as director.

=== Later work ===
In 2025, Aiello co-directed the short documentary Cuero y deforestación (Leather and Deforestation) with Roly Ruiz. The film examines deforestation of red quebracho forests in the Gran Chaco and the production of tannin for the leather industry. It was screened in Berlin during the eighth Refugees Film Festival at Lichtblick-Kino.

== Filmography ==
- Awka Liwen (2010) – co-director, co-screenwriter and producer
- Martínez de Hoz (2017) – director
- Cuero y deforestación / Leather and Deforestation (2025) – co-director
