= Pacho O'Donnell =

Argentine writer, politician, historian and physician

- Born: Mario Ernesto O'Donnell Ure; 28 October 1941 (age 84); Buenos Aires, Argentina
- Occupations: Physician, politician, writer, and historian
- Spouse: Susana Evans Civit
- Children: 5
- Writing career
- Language: Spanish
- Period: 1975-2012
- Genre: Historian
- Notable works: Rosas, el maldito de la historia oficial
- Notable awards: Illustrious citizen of Buenos Aires (2009)

Mario Ernesto O'Donnell Ure (born 28 October 1941), known professionally as "Pacho O'Donnell", is an Argentine writer, politician, historian and physician who specializes in psychoanalysis.

== Career ==
After the return to democracy in Argentina in 1983, he was named Secretary of Culture of the city of Buenos Aires. He ran unsuccessfully for the 1988 presidential nomination in the Radical Civic Union primaries, but later became a Peronist and was elected to the Argentine Senate for the city of Buenos Aires in 1998. President Carlos Menem appointed O'Donnell Ambassador to Bolivia and Paraguay, as well as Secretary of Culture. He was elected to the Buenos Aires City Legislature in 2002.

He is currently engaged on the diffusion of Argentine historical knowledge, being part of the "neorevisionist" school which contests the official reading of history imposed in Argentina (democracy being restored only in 1983), and hosted the television show Historia confidencial (Confidential History) with fellow historians José Ignacio García Hamilton and Felipe Pigna.

He received the "Isabel la Católica" ("Isabella the Catholic") order from the Spanish King Juan Carlos I of Spain, and the "Palmas Académicas" ("Academic palms") in France. The legislature of Buenos Aires honoured him as illustrious citizen in October 2009.

== Family ==
Born in Buenos Aires to Mario Antonio O'Donnell Suárez and Susana Lucrecia Ure Aldao, he is married to Susana Evans Civit, with whom he has five children. His brother, Guillermo, was a noted political scientist.

== Works ==
=== Fiction ===
==== Short stories ====
- La seducción de la hija del portero (1975)

==== Novels ====
- Doña Leonor, los rusos y los yanquis (1981)
- El tigrecito de Mompracén (1980)
- Las hormigas de Carlitos Chaplín (1977)
- Copsi (1973; the title is a combination of Coca and Pepsi)

=== Non fiction ===
==== Essays and history ====
- El Prójimo
- Juana Azurduy, la Teniente Coronela (1994)
- El descubrimiento de Europa (1992)
- Monteagudo, la pasión revolucionaria
- El grito sagrado, with Alejandro Dolina
- El águila guerrera
- El rey blanco
- Juan Manuel de Rosas, el maldito de nuestra historia oficial
- El Che
- Los héroes malditos
- Historia confidencial, with José García Hamilton and Felipe Pigna

==== Psychology ====
- Analisis freudiano de grupo (1984)
- El juego – Técnicas lúdicas en psicoterapia
- La teoría de la transferencia en psicoterapia grupal (1977)
- Teoría y técnica de la psicoterapia grupal (1975)
- Psicología Dinámica Grupal (1980)
