= Estíbaliz Gabilondo =

Spanish actress and journalist

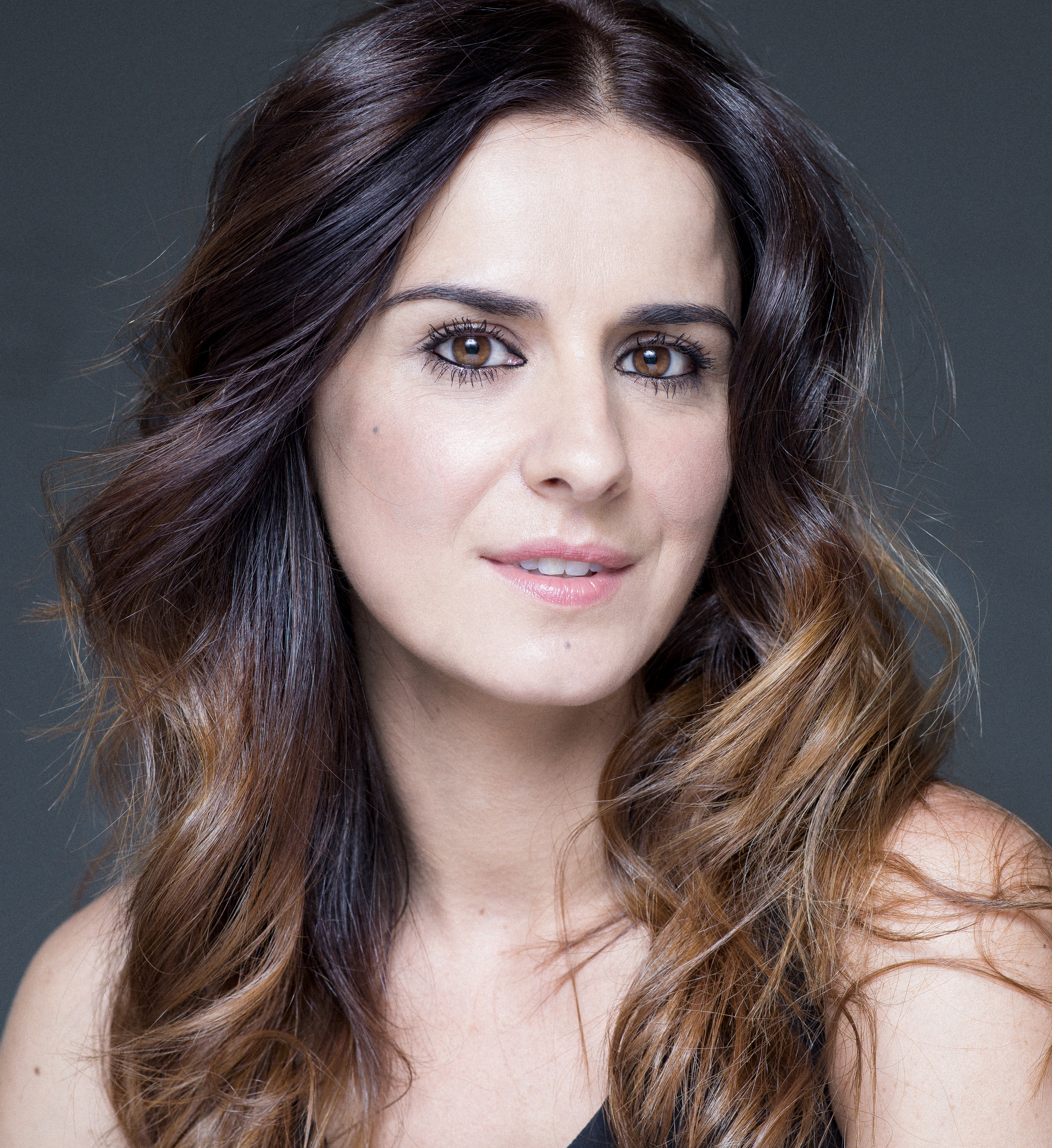
Estíbaliz Gabilondo

Estíbaliz "Esti" Gabilondo Cuéllar (born 16 November 1976 in San Sebastián) is a Spanish actress and journalist. She is niece of the former Minister of Education Ángel Gabilondo, and the journalist Iñaki Gabilondo.

She studied Audiovisual Communication at the University of Navarre and drama at the Laboratorio de Teatro William Layton. After several works as an actress, she became a reporter for the program Caiga quien caiga in 2008.

== Biography ==
After graduating with a degree in Audiovisual Communication from the University of Navarra, she moved to Madrid to train as an actress at the William Layton Theater Laboratory. After several acting roles in various films and television series, she rose to fame by becoming the first female reporter on the television program Caiga quien caiga. She joined the program in 2008, when it was bought by LaSexta, to replace Gonzo in the Proteste ya section, breaking the mold and changing the aesthetics of the program (something that had already been attempted a few years earlier with the participation of drag queen Deborah Ombres). With the arrival of CQC on Cuatro in April 2010, Esti returned as a reporter for the program.

In 2011, he joined the production company Cuatro Cabezas as a screenwriter for shows such as ¿Quién quiere casarse con mi hijo? (Who Wants to Marry My Son?), Me cambio de década (I'm Changing Decades), Acapella, Un príncipe para Corina (A Prince for Corina), El jefe infiltrado (The Undercover Boss), and Perdidos en la tribu (Lost in the Tribe). After the company went bankrupt in 2017, he joined Warner Bros ITVP, where he has worked as a screenwriter on Ven a cenar conmigo (Come Dine with Me), Ven a cenar conmigo: Gourmet edition (Come Dine with Me: Gourmet Edition), and First Dates. He has also contributed as a columnist to the newspaper El País (in its Basque Country edition), as well as to several radio programs. Starting in October 2022, he will participate in the program El comodín on La 1 as a voice actor.

== Filmography ==
- Mano a mano, by Ignacio Tatay. (2007)
- Estrellas que alcanzar, by Mikel Rueda. (2009)
- Casual Day, by Max Lemcke. (2007)
- Traumalogía, by Daniel Sánchez Arévalo (2007)
- Locos por el sexo, by Javier Rebollo (2006)
- El Calentito, by Chus Gutiérrez (2005)
- Slam, by Miguel Martí (2003)

== Television ==
- Alfonso, el príncipe maldito, Telecinco, (2010)
- Estados Alterados Maitena, La Sexta, (2009)
- Malas Compañías, La Sexta (2009)
- Caiga quien caiga, laSexta, Cuatro (2008)
- Amar en tiempos revueltos, La 1 (2007–2008)
- A tortas con la vida, Antena 3 (2005)
- Paco y Veva, TVE-1 (2004).
- Hospital Central, Telecinco.
- Policías, Antena 3.
- Esto no es serio, ETB
- Kilker Dema, ETB
