= Arizmendi =

Arizmendi is a Spanish surname. It is the castilianized form of the Basque surname Arismendi, formed from aritz (oak) + mendi (mountain).

It may refer to:

== People ==
- Martín de Ursúa Arizmendi, Count of Lizárraga and Castillo, Spanish conquistador, Governor-General of the Philippines (1709- 1715)
- Joan Josep Hervás i Arizmendi, modernist Catalan architect; municipal architect of Sitges, Tortosa and Manila, Philippines
- Ángel Javier Arizmendi, Spanish football player
- Baby Arizmendi, Mexican boxer
- Daniel Arizmendi López, Mexican kidnapper
- Elena Arizmendi Mejía, Mexican feminist and founder of the Neutral White Cross
- Helena Arizmendi, Argentine opera singer
- Juan Alejo de Arizmendi, Puerto Rican cleric
- José María Arizmendiarrieta, founder of the Mondragon cooperatives

== Others ==
- Arizmendi Bakery, cooperatives in the San Francisco Bay Area, California

== See also ==
- Arismendi (disambiguation)
