= Pergolini =

Pergolini is a surname. Notable people with the surname include:

- Gia Pergolini (born 2004), American Paralympic swimmer
- Mario Pergolini (born 1964), Argentine journalist, media producer and businessman
