= Elena Arizmendi =

Elena Arizmendi may refer to:

- Elena Arizmendi Mejía (1884–1949), Mexican feminist activist
- Helena Arizmendi (1920s–2015), Argentine operatic soprano, sometimes billed as Elena Arizmendi
