= Rafinha Bastos =

Brazilian actor (born 1976)

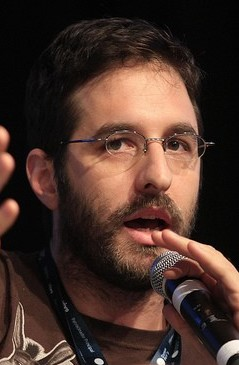
- Bastos in 2012
- Born: Rafael Bastos Hocsman; December 5, 1976 (age 49); Porto Alegre, Rio Grande do Sul, Brazil
- Education: Pontifical Catholic University of Rio Grande do Sul
- Occupations: Actor, humorist, television presenter, journalist, screenwriter, YouTuber, businessman, basketball player (early)
- Years active: 1997–present
- Height: 2.00 m (6 ft 7 in)
- Website: www.rafinhabastos.com.br www.youtube.com/user/rafinhabastos (YouTube channel)

Rafael Bastos Hocsman (Brazilian Portuguese: [ʁafaˈɛw ˈbastuz ʁoksˈmɐ̃]; born December 5, 1976), better known as Rafinha Bastos (pronounced [ʁaˈfĩɲɐ ˈbastus]) or simply Rafi Bastos, is a Brazilian comedian, actor, journalist and television personality.

== International career ==
Bastos expanded his work internationally by moving to the United States to perform stand-up comedy in English. His work breaking into the American comedy scene has been noted by publications covering Brazilian artists abroad.

His global reach grew significantly with the release of his comedy special, Ultimato, on Netflix in 2018. The special was reviewed by international media and made available to a worldwide audience. In 2011, he was cited by The New York Times as one of the most influential personalities on Twitter, highlighting his significant presence on the platform.

== Biography ==
Rafinha Bastos was born to a Jewish family in Porto Alegre, Brazil. His ancestors immigrated from Russia. He received a scholarship in 1999 to play basketball at Chadron State College in Chadron, Nebraska. Later, he played basketball in Brazil for SOGIPA, from Porto Alegre, in 2000, helping the team to win the title of the State Basketball Championship in Rio Grande do Sul.

Rafinha Bastos was a former host of "CQC" a popular TV show in Brazil. Since May 2010, he also hosts another TV show, "A Liga", which is broadcast by Band TV channel.

In 2010, Bastos, together with comedian Danilo Gentili and producer Italo Gusso, opened a comedy club in Brazil, in the city of São Paulo, called Comedians Comedy Club, closed down in 2020.

In 2011, Rafinha became famous worldwide after The New York Times named him the world's most influential person on Twitter.

In CQC's September 19, 2011 live broadcast, Bastos made an allegedly dark humor joke about singer Wanessa; when Marcelo Tas, the show's main host, remarked how beautiful the singer looked pregnant, Bastos replied: "Muito. Comeria ela e o bebê." ("Absolutely. I'd do her and the baby"). The joke caused controversy among audiences and was taken with severe criticism. Following the next broadcast on September 26, Bastos was suspended from the show. He was rumoured to have asked his resignation on his contract, but the fact was not confirmed. On October 13, Wanessa and her husband Marcus Buaiz sued Bastos for R$100,000 claiming personal injury. Currently, Rafinha works in stand-up comedy and regularly posts to YouTube.

In 2016, it was announced that Bastos would be a host on the Netflix reality show Ultimate Beastmaster.

== Television ==
Year	Title	Role	Notes
2005	Os Ricos Também Choram	Doctor	2 episodes
2006–2008	Mothern	Marcelo	
2009	Descolados	Valter	2 episodes
2009	As Olívias	Léo	2 episodes
2008–2011	CQC	Himself	
2010–2013	A Liga	Himself	
2011	Olívias na TV	Pedro Henrique	1 episode
2012	Saturday Night Live Brasil	Himself	
2012–2013	A Vida de Rafinha Bastos	Himself	
2014–2015	Agora é Tarde	Himself	
2016–2017	Chamado Central	Himself	
2016	Tá Rindo do Quê?	Himself	
2017	Ultimate Beastmaster Brasil	Himself	
2017	Eu, Ela e um Milhão de Seguidores	Michel Goldenberg	

== Filmography ==
Year	Title	Role
2007	Amigas	Odair
2012	O Riso dos Outros	Himself
2013	The Dognapper	Doctor Roberto
2014	Copa de Elite	René Rodrigues
2014	O Segredo do Molho	Politic
2015	Superpai	Gilson
2015	O Tempo	
2016	Mais Forte que o Mundo	Marcos Loro
2017	Internet: O Filme	Cesinha Passos

== Theater ==
Year	Title	Type
2004	Mondo Cane	Stand-up
2006–10	A Arte do Insulto	Stand-up released on DVD
2008	Improvável	Vários
2011	Apenas Uma Boa Pessoa	Shown only once
2011–14	Péssima Influência	Posted on YouTube on May 5, 2015
2018	Últimas Palavras	Stand-up
