= Los mitos de la historia argentina =

Book series by Felipe Pigna

Los mitos de la Historia Argentina
- First book of the series, cover of the expanded version.
- Author: Felipe Pigna
- Country: Argentina
- Language: Spanish language
- Genre: History of Argentina
- Publisher: Planeta

Los mitos de la historia argentina (in English, "The myths of Argentine History") is a series of books written by Felipe Pigna, focused on the History of Argentina. As of 2010 the series have four books, which span from the Spanish arrival to America up to the governments of Juan Domingo Perón.

== Summary ==
The first book was written in 2004. It starts with the Voyages of Christopher Columbus and the revolution led by Túpac Amaru. From those points it jumps to the British invasions of the Río de la Plata, the May Revolution, the counter-revolution led by Santiago de Liniers, and chapters focused on Juan José Castelli and Manuel Belgrano. It ends with the Declaration of Independence of Argentina and the war of the Supreme Directors against Artigas. The success of the book led to the printing of an expanded edition.

The second book was written in 2005, and the first chapters are biographies of José de San Martín, Hipólito Bouchard and Martín Miguel de Güemes. The government of Bernardino Rivadavia follows, and the biographies of Manuel Dorrego and Juan Manuel de Rosas. After it, it talks about the Paraguayan War, the governments of Domingo Faustino Sarmiento and Julio Argentino Roca, the 1890 crisis, and ends with the massive immigrations and syndical riots that took place during the centennial of the May Revolution.

The third book starts to give a higher detailed coverage to a smaller time span, going across the first radical governments, the infamous decade and the 1943 Revolution.

The fourth book, the last one edited to date, is focused solely on the governments of Juan Domingo Perón and Eva Perón.

== Reception ==
As of 2006, the first book of the series was reprinted more than twenty times since its first edition in 2004, and it was among the best sold non-fiction books in the 2004, 2005 and 2006 editions of the Buenos Aires International Book Fair.

== Bibliography ==
- Devoto, Fernando (2010). Historiadores, ensayistas y gran público. Buenos Aires: Editorial Biblos. ISBN 978-950-786-778-1.
