= Peacetime (film) =

2009 film directed by Daniel Filho

- Directed by: Daniel Filho
- Written by: Bosco Brasil (play)
- Produced by: Daniel Filho
- Starring: Tony Ramos; Dan Stulbach; Ailton Graça; Daniel Filho
- Cinematography: Tuca Moraes
- Edited by: Diana Vasconcellos
- Production companies: Globo Filmes; Lereby Productions
- Distributed by: Downtown Filmes; Europa Filmes
- Release date: August 14, 2009
- Running time: 80 minutes
- Country: Brazil
- Language: Portuguese

Peacetime (Portuguese: Tempos de Paz) is a 2009 Brazilian drama film, directed by Daniel Filho. The film is based on the play Novas Diretrizes em Tempos de Paz, written by Bosco Brasil.

== Plot ==
Segismundo (Tony Ramos) is a former political police officer of Getúlio Vargas' government, who used to torture prisoners. In April 1945, he is the chief of the Immigration Office in Rio de Janeiro and, therefore, is in charge of preventing the entry of Nazis. Then, the Polish Clausewitz (Dan Stulbach) must convince him that he is a victim in order to gain access to the country.

Peacetime is a film that turns a very complex issue (i.e. immigration) into a simple story of a day that changes the lives of two men.
