= Felipe Pigna =

Argentine historian and writer (born 1959)

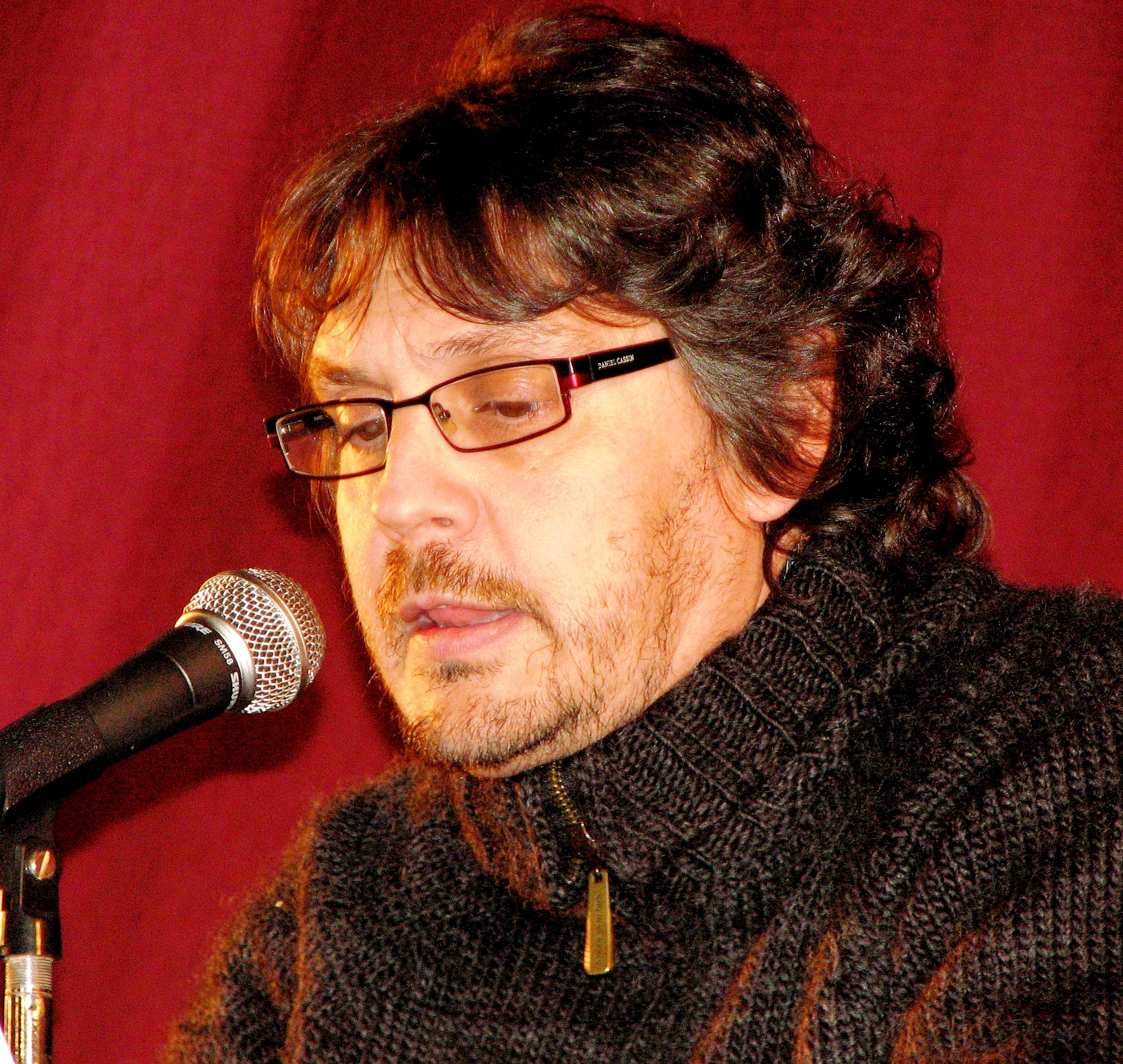
- Historian Felipe Pigna
- Born: 29 May 1959 (age 67); Mercedes, Argentina
- Education: Instituto Nacional Joaquín V. González
- Occupations: Historian, writer
- Writing career
- Language: Spanish
- Notable works: Los mitos de la historia argentina I, II, III & IV
- Website: pigna.com.ar

Felipe Pigna (born 29 May 1959) is an Argentine historian and writer. He is among the best-selling authors from Argentina.

== Biography ==
Pigna teaches at the Escuela Superior de Comercio Carlos Pellegrini, directing the Ver la Historia project that produced 13 documentaries covering the 1776–2001 period of the History of Argentina. He is a columnist, appears on radio programs, and contributes to newspapers and magazines such as Noticias, Veintitrés and Todo es Historia. He is the director of Caras y Caretas magazine.

He has served as a history adviser for TV networks such as HBO, People and Arts, Italy's RAI, and Spain's Antena 3. He was a columnist of Historia Confidencial, an Argentine TV show.

Pigna is a CEO and writes for the historically focused website El Historiador (The Historian). He is often seen in the media talking about historical subjects. He is the host of Vida y Vuelta, a television program of historical documentaries and interviews.

With Mario Pergolini, Pigna wrote, produced and hosted Algo habrán hecho por la historia argentina, a TV show aired in 2005 (and later released in a set of DVDs) which combines documentary, humor and free reenactments of historical events. The show granted him a Martín Fierro award, and in his acceptance speech he dedicated the prize to some of his historical national heroes, namely Mariano Moreno, Juan José Castelli, Manuel Belgrano and Manuel Dorrego.

== Style ==
The works of Felipe Pigna are not aimed to the academic public, but to the masses. To this purpose, he employs slang, plain language, and some humor and references to the reader. He attempts to relate historical Argentina with modern Argentina, setting parallels between past and modern events or circumstances. He considers that events do not really repeat themselves exactly because circumstances change, but the consequences are likely to be broadly the same, such as wealth gaps leading to authoritarian governments. His works usually describe history as a dispute between the people and the powerful classes, where the latter ones oppressed the population both now and then, and even so people would manage to achieve some victories, even if short-lived.

Historians Tulio Halperín Dongui and Luis Alberto Romero made strong criticism of Pigna's style, and refuse to consider his work as real history books even if Pigna is a professional historian. They consider that his works do not show historiographical culture, general culture or literary talent, and that the works cited in them are misquoted or taken out of context. Pigna uses as a pretext that foreign works accept and acknowledge subjective views, and his aim was to make the history of Argentina easy to understand by all people. Furthermore, he insists that an opposing approach to the topic was elitist, revealing a completely lack of objectivity in his writings .

== Works ==
Some of Pigna's works include:

- Historia. El mundo contemporáneo (2000) ISBN 950-534-616-6.
- Historia. La Argentina contemporánea (2000) ISBN 950-534-651-4.
- Pasado en Presente (2001).
- Historia Confidencial (2003) ISBN 950-49-0991-4.
- Los mitos de la historia argentina (2004) ISBN 987-545-149-5.
- The Myths of Argentine History (2005) ISBN 987-545-228-9.
- Los Mitos de la Historia Argentina 2 (2005) ISBN 950-49-1342-3.
- Lo pasado pensado (2005)
- Los mitos de la historia argentina 3(2006)
- Historia confidencial, with José Ignacio García Hamilton and Pacho O'Donnell
- 1810 – La otra historia de nuestra Revolución fundadora, Editorial Planeta, Buenos Aires 2010 ISBN 978-950-49-2288-9
- Libertadores de América (2010)
- Mujeres tenían que ser (2011)

== Bibliography ==
- Devoto, Fernando (2010). Historiadores, ensayistas y gran público. Buenos Aires: Editorial Biblos. ISBN 978-950-786-778-1.
