= Arismendi Municipality =

Arismendi Municipality may refer to the following places in the Venezuela:

- Arismendi Municipality, Barinas
- Arismendi Municipality, Nueva Esparta
- Arismendi Municipality, Sucre
