= Casual Day =

- Theatrical release poster
- Directed by: Max Lemcke
- Written by: Pablo Remón; Daniel Remón
- Produced by: Iker Monfort; Álvaro Augustin
- Starring: Juan Diego; Luis Tosar; Javier Ríos; Estíbaliz Gabilondo; Alberto San Juan; Arturo Valls; Álex Angulo; Carlos Kaniowsky; Secun de la Rosa; Mikel Losada; Malena Alterio
- Cinematography: Javier Palacios
- Music by: Pierre Omer
- Production companies: Monfort Producciones; Telecinco Cinema; Videntia Frames
- Distributed by: Buena Vista International
- Release dates: September 2007 (San Sebastián); 9 May 2008 (Spain)
- Country: Spain
- Language: Spanish

Casual Day is a 2007 Spanish dark workplace comedy film directed by Max Lemcke. The ensemble cast features Juan Diego, Luis Tosar, Estíbaliz Gabilondo, Arturo Valls, Alberto San Juan, Malena Alterio, Álex Angulo, Carlos Kaniowsky, Secun de la Rosa, Marta Etura and Mikel Losada.

== Plot ==
Ruy is a young man who has always had it easy. But José Antonio, the father of his girlfriend Inés, gets him a job promotion in the company as José Antonio wants to groom Ruy as his successor, even if Ruy actually wants to dump Inés, so he finds himself cornered.

== Cast ==
- Juan Diego as José Antonio
- Javier Ríos as Ruy
- Luis Tosar as Cholo
- Alberto San Juan as psychologist
- Marta Etura as Inés
- Estíbaliz Gabilondo as Marta
- Arturo Valls as Morales
- Secun de la Rosa
- Malena Alterio as Bea
- Alex Angulo as Arozamena
- Carlos Kaniowsky as Velasco
- Mikel Losada

== Production ==
The screenplay was penned by Pablo and Daniel Remón. A Monfort Producciones, Telecinco Cinema and Videntia Frames production, the film was shot in between Madrid and Amasa (Gipuzkoa). Shooting wrapped in 2006.

== Release ==
The film premiered at the San Sebastián International Film Festival in September 2007. It also screened at the Gothenburg Film Festival, the Miami Film Festival and the Málaga Spanish Film Festival. It was theatrically released in Spain on 9 May 2008.

== Reception ==
Reviewing for Fotogramas, Mirito Torreiro rated Casual Day with 4 out of 5 stars, drawing out the entire cast, "without exception", to be the best thing about the film, assessing it to be "a stimulating opera prima that sheds light on the real situation of labour relations".

Javier Ocaña of El País deemed the film to be a "choral portrait of private and public contempt as stark as it is humorous, performed by a magnificent group of comedians", "written with precision, simplicity and an extremely dark sense of humour".

== Accolades ==
Year	Award	Category	Nominee(s)	Result	Ref.
2009	64th CEC Medals	Best Film		Won	
2009	64th CEC Medals	Best Director	Max Lemcke	Won	
2009	64th CEC Medals	Best Actor	Juan Diego	Won	
2009	64th CEC Medals	Best Supporting Actor	Luis Tosar	Nominated	
2009	64th CEC Medals	Best Supporting Actress	Estíbaliz Gabilondo	Nominated	
2009	64th CEC Medals	Best Original Screenplay	Daniel Remón, Pablo Remón	Won	
2009	64th CEC Medals	Best Newcomer	Max Lemcke	Nominated	

== See also ==
- List of Spanish films of 2008
