= Javier Martín =

Javier Martín may refer to:

- Javier Martín-Torres (born 1970), Spanish physicist
- Javier Martín (mountaineer) (born 1981), Spanish ski mountaineer
- Javier Martin (born 1985), Spanish artist
