= Cuatro Cabezas =

Defunct argentine production company

Eyeworks Cuatro Cabezas (in English, Four Heads), also known as 4K, was an Argentine production company that specializes in content for television, radio and motion picture production, advertising, and Internet content. It was founded in 1993 by owners and founders, Diego Guebel, Sebastián Melendez, Caito Lorenzo and Mario Pergolini. The company also operates in Chile, Brazil, Spain and Italy.

Cuatro Cabezas started as an independent television producer; after 15 years it became a significant multimedia company in the Spanish speaking world.

On August 16, 2007, Dutch international production group Eyeworks announced that they had acquired Cuatro Cabezas. On February 11, 2014, the Warner Bros. Television Group announced the purchase of Eyeworks for US$273 million. However, Eyeworks USA would remain independent. The acquisition was completed on June 2 of that year. The acquisition gives Warner Bros. TV production units in 15 additional territories.

== Television ==
=== Free TV ===
- CQC (1996– )
- El Rayo (1995–2002)
- Super M 2002 (2002)
- Camino a la gloria (2002)
- Super M 2003 (2003)
- Planetario (2003)
- E-24 (2003–2006)
- Algo habrán hecho (2005– )
- La Liga (2005–2007)
- Nos pierde la fama (2006)
- Hermanos y Detectives (2007) (Spanish version)
- 30 Segundos
- La Ultima Tentacion
- Ciudad Roja

=== Pay TV ===
- Ciudades y Copas (Discovery Travel & Living)
- Casas (Discovery Travel & Living)
- Historia Secreta (History Channel)
- Proyecto 48 (TNT)

== Radio ==
X4 FM is Cuatro Cabezas’ radio station, founded in August 2000. It changed its format in June 2001. It mostly transmits material rarely found on other stations.

== Film ==
- Plata quemada (2000)
- La Ciénaga (2000)

== Internet ==
In 1999, the company created Datafull.com. The website provides updated information, tools and technological knowledge for users of Internet.

At the end of 1999, Datafull.com was created, at that time one of the most important Spanish-speaking sites, in charge of providing the user with the necessary tools and technological knowledge to make the most of their experience on the Web. Datafull started as a file-sharing forum (primarily MP3) called 4kByte, in partnership with Sion Internet.

Datafull Access, a free Internet service, emerged from the hand of the technology portal and in a short time became one of the main free Internet providers in Argentina. The service was provided for home lines, while Sion Internet provided its services to businesses (including hosting, VPN, Local Intranet management, etc.).

Around the year 2004, Datafull Branding was born, aimed at satisfying the design and interactive communication needs of important local and foreign companies, through the creation of websites, advertising campaigns and e-marketing. Among its clients were Frávega, Fibertel, Movistar, Discovery Channel and Multicanal.

On March 4, 2009, the Internet division of Eyeworks-Cuatro Cabezas (made up of Datafull and Datafull Branding) closed definitively, as it was weakened by the global economic crisis, in addition to the low profitability it brought to the company. Currently, both the Datafull Access service and the email box are no longer available.

Controversy

Datafull Branding designed in 1997 the website 4kstore.com launched in 1999, named after the play on words between 4K (Four Heads) and Store (Store), which resulted in "Four Beaver", since the page had a beaver as pet. It was an Argentine humorist page where parody videos, parody music and products such as rates and shirts were uploaded.

The project was terminated in 2000 and 2001, but not before a complaint was made public for discrimination against the producer, by the INADI due to an issue called "Negros de Mierda" (performed by the band Jamón del Mar), published on the page directed by Eduardo de la Puente at the time, whose content was extremely xenophobic and racist.

The song became known as "200 black shit" or "N de M" appeared online in 2000, when this medium was not as popular as it is today and always attributed Jose Francisco Córdoba known to "El Chivi". Several years after that it was said that it did not belong to "El Chivi" among other reasons because the lyrics contain words that would be typical of Argentina. originally the context was as a response to the Tv show called "cabecita" The group that wrote the song turns out to be Jamón de Mar, an Argentine comedy group. Another reason indicates that the song was hosted for the first time on the satirical humor website 4kstore.com, canceled in 2003, which belonged to the Argentine humorist Mario Pergolini, and on Datafull, another Argentine website.

As of 2021, the song went viral in Spanish-speaking communities, becoming an internet meme thanks to a YouTube video uploaded in 2015 showing 2 people lip-syncing the song. YouTube removed the original video including all videos that have to do with the song for racist and xenophobic reasons.
