= Copa de Elite =

2014 film directed by Victor Brandt

- Theatrical release poster
- Directed by: Victor Brandt
- Screenplay by: Vitor Brandt; Pedro Aguilera
- Starring: Marcos Veras; Júlia Rabello; Rafinha Bastos; Anitta
- Production company: GLAZ
- Distributed by: Fox Film do Brasil
- Release date: March 17, 2014 (Brazil)
- Country: Brazil
- Language: Portuguese

Copa de Elite (English: Elite Cup, parodying the title of the 2007 film Tropa de Elite) is a 2014 Brazilian parody film released on April 17, 2014, directed by Victor Brandt, produced by GLAZ and distributed by 20th Century Fox. It stars humorists Marcos Veras and Júlia Rabello (who were, at the time, husband and wife), both of them already famous for their work with comedy troupe Porta dos Fundos, alongside Rafinha Bastos.

Heavily inspired by films such as Airplane!, Spaceballs and the Naked Gun franchise, Copa de Elite is a satire of several Brazilian blockbusters such as Se Eu Fosse Você (2006), Tropa de Elite (2007), Chico Xavier (2010), Bruna Surfistinha (2011) and Minha Mãe é uma Peça (2013), with main focus on the then-upcoming 2014 FIFA World Cup, which was hosted by Brazil.

== Cast ==
- Marcos Veras as Jorge Capitão
- Júlia Rabello as Bia Alpinistinha
- Daniel Furlan as Zero Dois
- Milton Filho as Zero Meia
- Rafael Studart as Zero Pi
- Rafinha Bastos as René Rodrigues
- Anitta as reporter
- Victor Leal as boss of Jorge
- Bento Ribeiro as Chico Xavier
- Alexandre Frota as mother of Jorge
- Babu Santana as Jamba
- Thammy Miranda as Navalhada
- Gil Brother as Beggar
- Bruno de Luca as himself

== Critical reception ==
Copa de Elite has received mostly negative reviews upon its release. Writing for Omelete, Thiago Romariz called it "an unfunny comedy that wastes good actors and an opportunity to joke about [Brazil's] current state of affairs", while giving slight praise to the acting of Marcos Veras, Júlia Rabello and Rafinha Bastos. Yuri Correa for Papo de Cinema called the film's humor "uninspired", "repetitive" and "painfully obvious", comparing it unfavorably to the work of British comedy troupe Monty Python and rating it with 1.5 stars out of 5. Cinema com Rapadura's Thiago Siqueira, rating it with a 1 out of 10, called it "an instant failed comedy resembling an attack to sanity rather than entertainment", noting its humor "lacks timing" and criticizing the lead actors' acting, particularly Bastos'; comparing it unfavorably to The Naked Gun franchise which inspired it, he ends his review by proclaiming, "[Copa de Elite] is nothing but a second-rate product trying to profit off the upcoming World Cup". For CinemAqui, Mariana González noted that "a crushing majority of the jokes don't work", calling it "a lazy work that doesn't recognize its few successes, insisting in repeating tirelessly what's harmful".
