= Oscar Filho =

Brazilian actor, comedian, writer and reporter

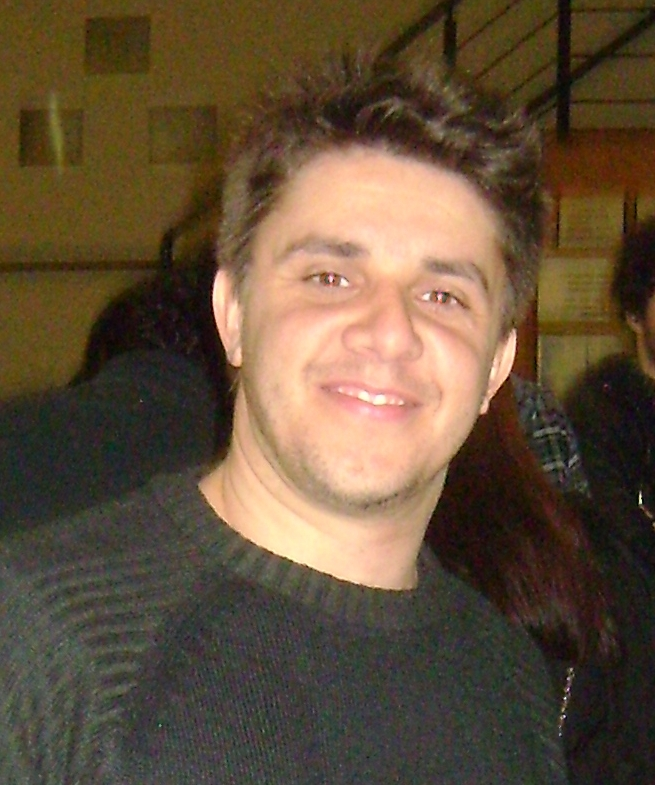
- Born: Oscar Francisco de Moraes Junior; August 27, 1978 (age 47); Atibaia, São Paulo, Brazil
- Occupations: Actor, comedian, writer and reporter
- Known for: stand-up comedy, CQC-Custe o Que Custar, Carrossel: O Filme, Carrossel 2: O Sumiço de Maria Joaquina, Xilindró, Programa da Maisa
- Website: http://www.oscarfilho.com.br

Oscar Francisco de Moraes Junior, better known by his stage name, Oscar Filho born August 22, 1978, in Atibaia is a Brazilian TV presenter, reporter, actor, comedian, writer and businessperson. In humor since 2003, he is recognized as one of the forerunners of the stand-up comedy movement in Brazil in 2005, founding the Clube da Comédia Stand-up, responsible for the initial movement in São Paulo, Brazil. He debuted his stand-up solo, Putz Grill... in 2008, running for 11 years and even released it on an album in 2020. In addition to having participated in numerous programs and documentaries about stand-up on TV and the internet. He wrote his first book, Autobiografia Não Autorizada in 2014 with a preface by Danilo Gentili which gave rise to his second stand-up solo entitled Alto - Biografia Não Autorizada in 2020.

He debuted on TV in 2008 with the show CQC-Custe o Que Custar, on Band. In closed channels, he did a stand-up special for Comedy Central, participated in the survival reality show Desafio Celebridades on Discovery Channel and sitcoms on channel Multishow as Aí Eu Vi Vantagem and four seasons of Xilindró. Back on open TV, he participated in the program Tá no Ar, on Globo, of the fourth season of Dancing Brasil on Record, of the documentary series Era Uma Vez Uma História on Band and co-presented the Programa da Maisa on SBT and Fox Channel. In 2022 the filming of the film Escola de Quebrada ended produced by Paramount+ and KondZilla and the series Marcelo Marmelo Martelo produced by Paramount+.
