= Dan Stulbach =

Brazilian actor (born 1969)

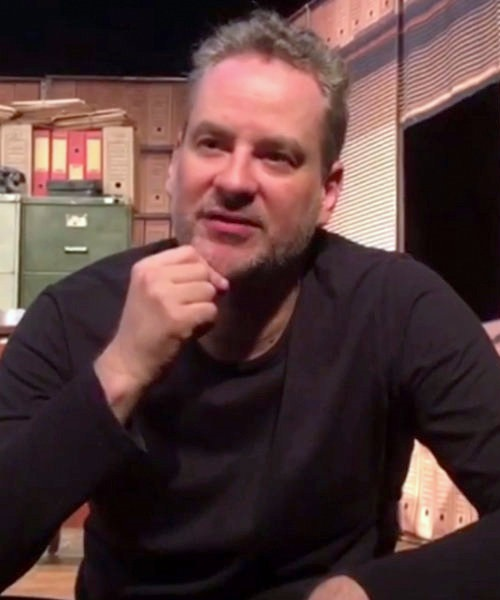
- Stulbach in 2016
- Born: Dan Filip Stulbach; September 26, 1969 (age 56); São Paulo, Brazil
- Occupation: Actor
- Years active: 1996–present
- Website: www.danstulbach.com.br

Dan Filip Stulbach (Brazilian Portuguese: [ˈdɐ̃ (i)sˈtuwbak(i)]; born September 26, 1969) is a Brazilian actor, television presenter, director, and artistic director.

== Biography ==
He is the first member of his Polish Jewish immigrant family to be born in Brazil. He has only one sister, who is a nutritionist and mother of his only nephew. At home, he grew up listening to the Polish language and stories from his grandfather about life in Poland, which was devastated during World War II.

After graduating from Colégio Rio Branco, he was undecided about his career path. He took college entrance exams and was admitted to programs in Medicine, Administration, and Engineering. However, he studied Engineering for a year before graduating in Social Communication from the School of Advertising and Marketing (ESPM). He also attended the School of Dramatic Art at USP. At ESPM, he created the theater group Tangerina, which still exists today. For eight years he directed group shows, which won several amateur theater festivals.

He lived in San Diego, California for almost a year. There he studied English and worked as a movie ticket holder. With the money he earned, he spent a season in New York City, where he could watch dozens of plays.

Stulbach is often touted as being similar to American actor Tom Hanks, having even been satirized as such by the group of comedians Casseta & Planeta.

== Career ==
Television
Year	Title	Role	Note
1996	O Rei do Gado	Reporter	
1997	O Amor Está no Ar	Horácio	
2001	Os Maias	Craft	Miniseries
2002	Esperança	André	
2003	Mulheres Apaixonadas	Marcos Soares	Prêmio Contigo! de Melhor Ator Revelação; Prêmio Qualidade de Melhor Ator Coadjuvante (Rio de Janeiro); Prêmio Qualidade de Melhor Ator Coadjuvante (São Paulo); Troféu APCA de Melhor Ator; Troféu Imprensa de Melhor Ator
2003	Papo de Anjo	Angel Gabriel	Especial
2003	Casseta & Planeta - Urgente	Tom Hanks	
2004	Senhora do Destino	Edgard Legrand	Indicated – Prêmio Contigo! de Melhor Par Romântico (with Carolina Dieckmann)
2006	Por Toda Minha Vida	Luís Carlos Miele	Especial
2006	JK	Zinque	TV series Indicated – Prêmio Contigo! de Melhor Ator Coadjuvante
2007	Amazônia, de Galvez a Chico Mendes	Leandro	Miniseries
2008	Queridos Amigos	Léo	Miniseries; Indicated – Prêmio Contigo! de Melhor Ator; Indicated – Prêmio Qualidade de Melhor Ator
2009	Som & Fúria	Ricardo Silva	Miniseries
2009	Norma	Fernando	Series
2010	Afinal, o Que Querem as Mulheres?	Jonas	Series
2011	Fina Estampa	Paulo Siqueira	
2014	Encontro com Fátima Bernardes	TV host	
2014	Segunda Dama	Paulo Hélio Garcez	Series
2015	CQC	TV host	Indicated - Prêmio F5 de Apresentador(a) do Ano
2015	Os Experientes	Luiz	Series
2017	A Força do Querer	Eugênio Garcia	
2018	O Sétimo Guardião	Eurico Malta Rocha	
2021	Carcereiros	Paulo Pereira Garcia	
2021	Filhas de Eva	Kléber Caldas	
2022	Pantanal	Ibraim Chaguri	
2026	Quem Ama Cuida	Dr. Ademir Santana	

Cinema
Year	Title	Role	Notes
2000	Mater Dei	Diogo	
2000	Cronicamente Inviável	Adam	Filmed in 1997
2003	Viva Voz	Duda	Filmed in 2001
2005	Mais Uma Vez Amor	Rodrigo	
2006	Living the Dream	Val	
2008	Dias e Noites	Felipe	
2009	Peacetime	Clausewitz	Based on the play Novas Diretrizes em Tempos de Paz; Prêmio Contigo! - Best actor Indicated – Grande Prêmio Vivo do Cinema Brasileiro – Best Actor
2009	Som & Fúria – O Filme	Ricardo da Silva	
2010	A Suprema Felicidade	Marcos	
2011	Onde Está a Felicidade?	Friend at dinner	
2015	My Hindu Friend	Marcos	
2016	The Jungle Book	Baguera	Dubbing
2016	O Vendedor de Sonhos	Julio César	
2016	Os Saltimbancos Trapalhões: Rumo a Hollywood	Tom Hanks	
2024	I'm Still Here	Bocaiuva Cunha	
2025	Fé para o Impossível	Philip Murdoch	

Theater
Year	Title	Role	Notes
1990	Peer Gynt	Peer Gynt	In August 1990, a production of the Secretary of State of the Culture with direction and adaptation of Roberto Lage was inaugurated in the Teatro Sérgio Cardoso (São Paulo), in the cast Dan Stulbach, Muriel Matalon and Paula Fernandes.

Videogames
Year	Title	Role	Notes
2013	Battlefield 4	Sgt. Clayton 'Pac' Pakowski	Dubbing
