= Tània Sàrrias =

Spanish television presenter and actress (born 1975)

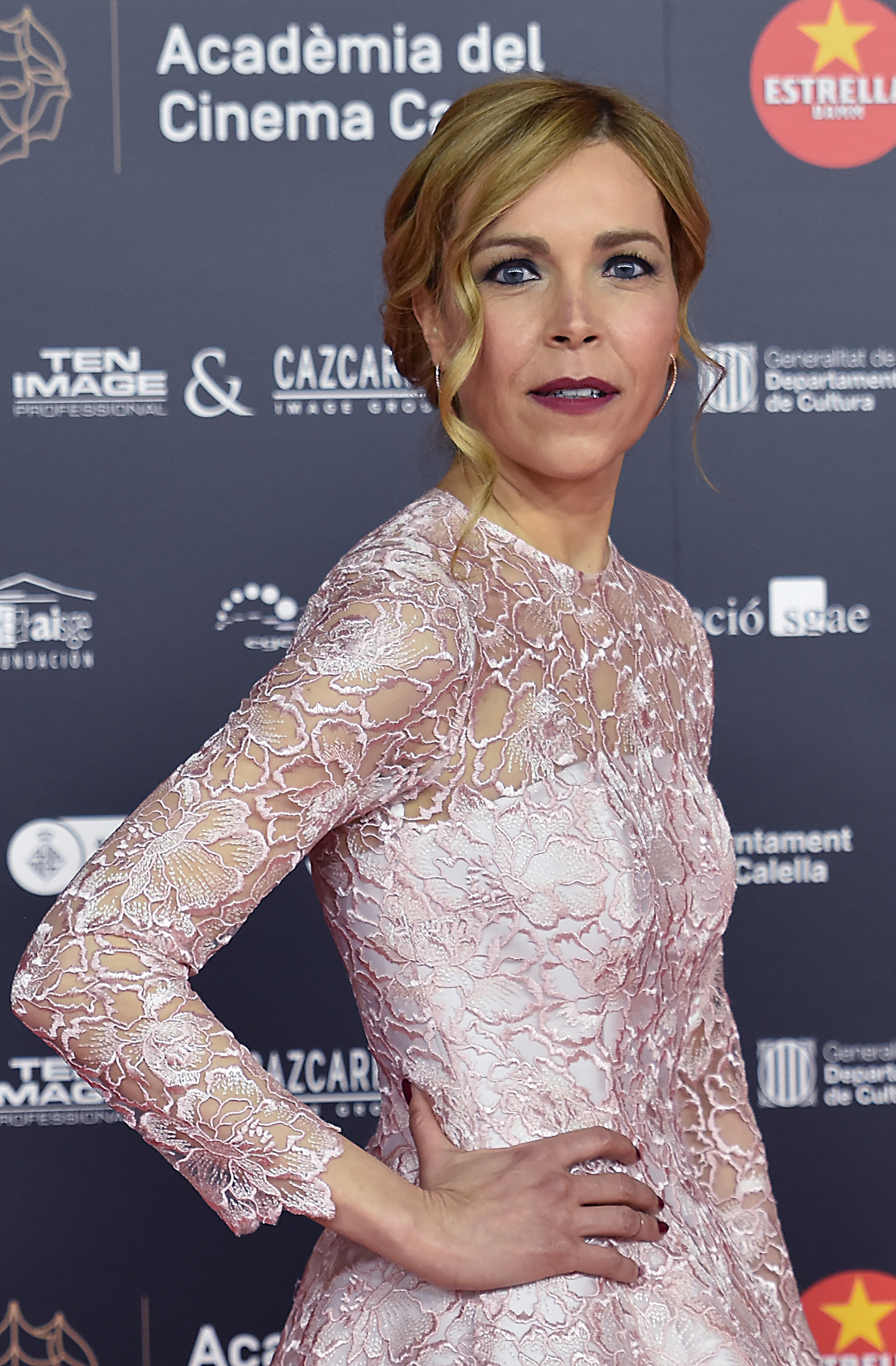
- Born: 28 September 1975 (age 50); Barcelona, Spain
- Education: Institut del Teatre
- Occupations: Presenter, actress

Tània Sàrrias (born 28 September 1975) is a Spanish television presenter and actress.

== Biography ==
Tània Sàrrias initially studied journalism, but when she was still in her first year of school she decided to switch to acting, and earned a licentiate in dramatic art at the Institut del Teatre of Barcelona.

She began her professional career as presenter of the musical program Sputnik on El 33 for more than two years. From there she went on to the TV3 afternoon show La Columna (2000–2004) presented by Julia Otero. In the summer of 2005 she worked as a reporter on the TV3 program Tr3s D presented by Ramón Pellicer. She also appeared on Otero's TVE program Las cerezas (2004–2005), and was the deputy director and presenter of TV3's daily live program Tvist.

In subsequent years, Sàrrias focused on her acting career. On television she had leading roles in series such as the well-known Ventdelplà, Rhesus, and Mar de fons, all on TV3. In cinema, she had a prominent role in the Spanish-language English film Reflections (2008) with Miguel Ángel Silvestre and worked under the direction of Xavi Berraondo in Hasta mañana (2009) and Psychophony (2012). In April 2010 she joined the Cuatro program CQC as a co-host.

In 2014 she appeared on the Telecinco series El Príncipe as agent Paula Carvajal.

In 2019 she published her first book, No et rendeixis (Don't Give Up), a collection of "22 keys to feeling better".
