= Rafael Cortez =

Brazilian journalist, actor and comedian

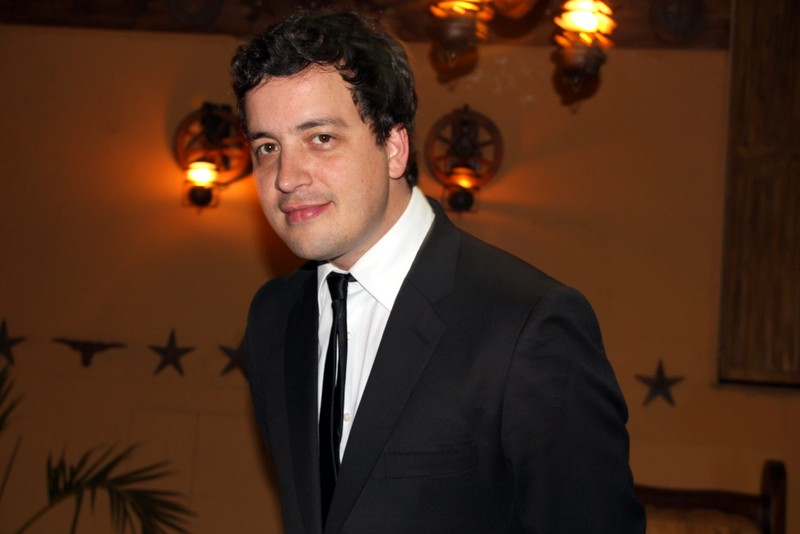
- Born: Rafael de Faria Cortez; October 25, 1976 (age 49); São Paulo, Brazil
- Occupations: Actor, comedian, journalist and composer
- Website: http://www.rafaelcortez.com

Rafael de Faria Cortez (born October 25, 1976) is a Brazilian journalist, actor and comedian.

== Education and career ==
Cortez graduated in journalism from PUC-SP and between 2008 and 2012 was a reporter of Custe o Que Custar.

On July 15, 2011, the show was the release of their independent CD called "Elegia da Alma" ("Elegy of the Soul", in English).

In 2013 Cortez was hired by the Rede Record to present the show Got Talent Brasil, a local version of Got Talent.

== Television ==
Períod	Title	Station	Notes	Ref.
2008–2012	Custe o Que Custar	Rede Bandeirantes	Reporter	
2013	Got Talent Brasil	Rede Record	Host	
2013	A Nova Família Trapo	Quintino	Especial de fim de ano	
2014	Me Leva Contigo	Apresentador		
2015	República do Stand-Up	Apresentador		
2015	Dirige Rafa	Apresentador		
2016–18	Vídeo Show	Repórter		
2017	Big Brother Brasil	Repórter	Temporada 17	
2017	Popstar	Participante	Temporada 1	
2018	Dra. Darci	Jarbas	Episódio: "O Quadro do Vovô"	
2018	Super Chef Celebridades	Participante	Temporada 7	
2019	Cine Holliúdy	Apresentador de Luta		
2021	Voluntários:Tudo pela Ciência	Apresentador	Disney +	

== Films ==
Year	Title	Character	Note
2002	X	Álvaro	Curta-metragem
2005	Torta	Fernando	Curta-metragem
2012	Wreck-It Ralph	Walt Disney Studios	Fix-It Felix Jr. (voice)
2014	Amor em Sampa	James	
2018	Ralph Breaks the Internet	Walt Disney Studios	Fix-It Felix Jr. (voice)
