= Deborah Ombres =

Spanish drag queen (born 1975)

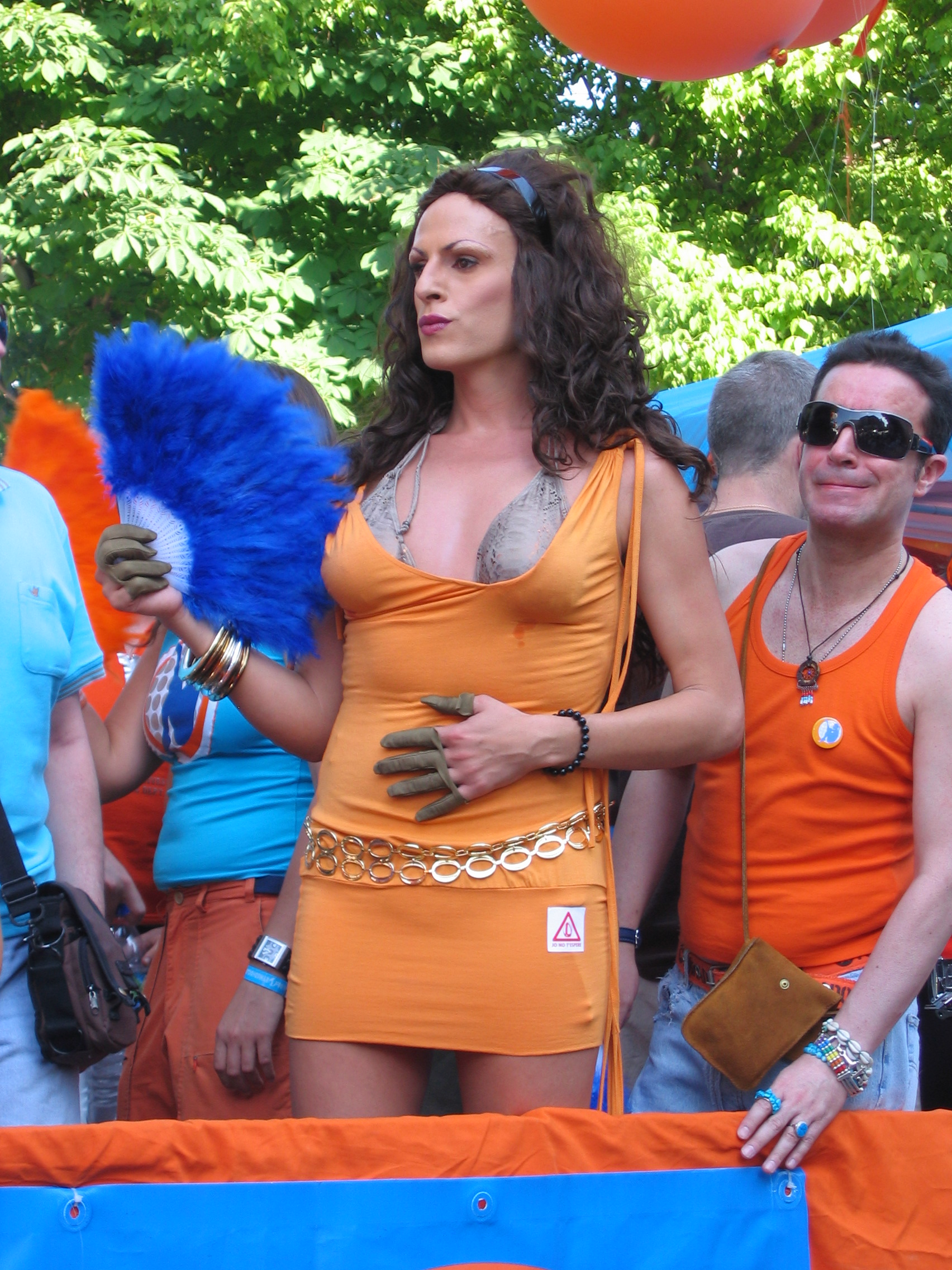
- Deborah Hombres at the 2006 Madrid Pride
- Born: Javier Diaz; November 3, 1975 (age 49); Valladolid, Spain
- Occupations: Drag Queen; Television Host; Actor
- Height: 1.78 m (5 ft 10 in)

Deborah Ombres is a Spanish drag queen and actor notable for being the country's first drag television host. Díaz's stage name, Deborah Ombres, is a play on words in Spanish. It sounds exactly the same as Devorahombres (which means, literally, "men-devourer"), a compound word formed from devorar (to devour) and hombres (men).

== Biography ==
Deborah studied dramatic arts in Valladolid, and in her last years decided she did not want to dedicate herself fully to theater. In the late 1990’s, Gretta Garola and Deborah created a drag-cabaret act inspired by The Adventures of Priscilla, Queen of the Dessert. After performing the act in El Tío Molonio, a bar in Valladoid, Ombres was encouraged to move to Madrid. Ombres toured as a drag queen her show, Mamá, quiero ser drágstica (Mom, I want to be a drag artist!), from 2002-2009.

From 2001-2004 Deborah hosted MTV Hot on MTV España, becoming the first drag queen host on Spanish television. Deborah had initially auditioned previously for MTV as a male presenter but did not receive the part. The warm reception of Deborah resulted in MTV giving Deborah a second show, Deborah y el Sexo (Deborah and Sex) which aired from 2002-2004. After her contract with MTV expired she signed with Antena 3 and became a talk show host on La isla de los famosos (The Island of the Famous).

In 2005 Deborah also stepped into writing with the book, Cuántos sapos hay que besar para encontrar un príncipe? (How many toads do I have to kiss to find a prince?), where she opened up about her sexual and romantic life in a self-described “for the first and last time” she would do so.

Also in 2005, she began working at Telecinco as a reporter and collaborator on the program Caiga Quien Caiga which she described as a “bitter” experience. She left all her television programs to present Rompecorazones (Heartbreaker) on the then new Cuatro, a Spanish TV channel, until 2006 when Cuatro cancelled the show.

From 2007 to 2009 Ombres worked for Pink TV, a program on the local Madrid Canal 53. In 2009 Ombres toured a show, Tonta ella, tonto él (She's stupid, He's stupid), alongside Canco Rodriguez and Cristina Urgel until 2010.

Deborah then moved to Saarbrücken, Germany and worked as a dishwasher in a hotel because she didn't know German. Afterwards Deborah moved to London where she worked in a Zara and was sometimes recognized by tourists. 2010 brought Ombres’ second book, Conectando con el sol (Connecting with the Sun), an autobiography.

Deborah has kept a low profile since 2010, making only minor Pride Day appearances in Madrid from 2011-2016. In 2017 a Barcelona producer seeking to do a Spanish adaption of RuPaul’s Drag Race titled Reinas (Queens) encouraged Ombres to return to Spain and film a pilot. Through this arrangement she visited New York as an Ambassador of World Pride in Madrid, appearing alongside Manila Luzon, Bob the Drag Queen, and La Terremoto de Alcorcón. At the same time, Ombres was part of the program Spain calling, Aloha Edition on TVE, prior to the Eurovision Song Contest. After the Reinas show ultimately stalled, Deborah remained in Spain and now lives quietly in Valladolid.

== Filmography ==
- MTV Hot (2001-2004)
- Deborah y el Sexo (2002-2004)
- La isla de los famosos (2004)
- Caiga quien caiga (2005)
- Rompecorazones (2006)
- Lalola (2008)
- Pink TV (2007-2009)
- Mrs. Carrington (2009)
- Quiero ser divina (2010)
- Spain calling, Aloha Edition (2017)

== Productions ==
- ¡Mamá, quiero ser drágstica! (2002-2009)
- Tonta ella, tonto él (2009-2010)

== Books ==
- ¿A cuántos sapos hay que besar para encontrar un príncipe? (Aguilar, 2005).
- Conectando con el sol (Lamed, 2010).
