= Marco Luque =

Brazilian humorist (born 1974)

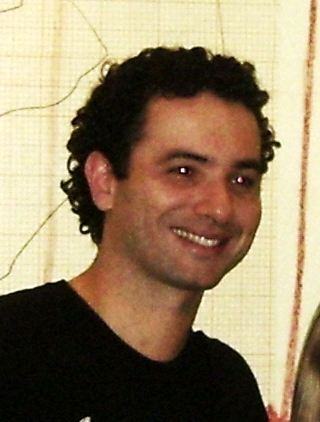
- Born: Marcos Luque Martins; April 9, 1974 (age 52); São Paulo, SP, Brazil

Marcos Luque Martins (born April 8, 1974) is a Brazilian humorist, well known for his performances as a stand-up comedian and as one of the hosts of the Brazilian version for the Argentinian TV program CQC - Caiga Quien Caiga - (Spanish for Whoever might fall), in Portuguese, Custe o que Custar (Whatever it takes).
