= Marcelo Arismendi =

Chilean journalist

Marcelo Arismendi is a Chilean journalist. He hosted the radio program Wipeout, Hombre al Agua, and was a reporter for Pasiones.
