= Marcelo Tas =

- Born: November 10, 1959 (age 66); Ituverava, São Paulo, Brazil
- Occupations: TV host; director; writer; actor
- Website: www.marcelotas.com.br

Marcelo Tristão Athayde de Souza (born November 10, 1959), better known as Marcelo Tas, is a Brazilian director, writer, actor and television presenter. Host of PROVOCA and commentator for Jornal da Cultura of TV Cultura. He works as a speaker and develops series on communication and innovation for companies, in 2020 he made 103 participations in events. He is also a professor at the Domestika platform and works in corporate training. He was the main host of Torcedores.com for the coverage of the 2018 Soccer World Cup in Russia. Before: children's series "Ra-Tim-Bum" (TV Cultura - Brazil); “Ernesto Varela, the Reporter” (MTV Brasil, Gazeta, SBT, TV Record-Brasil); Telecurso (TV Globo / Roberto Marinho Foundation); and anchor for 7 years of the comedy program CQC (Band).

== Other references ==
- The (TV) Cultura lost his hand in an area that was the leader, tried to reinvent the wheel three times. The 'Rá-Tim-Bum', a project extremely daring and successful, was abandoned to turn the 'Castelo (Rá-Tim-Bum)', which was also very good. There had to stop. Instead of continuing, preferred to create 'Ilha Rá-Tim-Bum', which failed.
- In an interview with Quem criticizing the TV Cultura, the television station where he worked for several years. "Marcelo Tas critica a TV Cultura" (in Portuguese). Quem Online. December 27, 2009.
- In a news magazine Alfa, talks about his daughter being gay. Ronaldo Bressane (September 12, 2010). "Vote em mim" (in Portuguese). Alfa. Archived from the original on October 6, 2010.
