= Javier Martin =

- Born: 1985 (age 40–41); Ceuta Spain
- Occupation: Artist
- Website: https://www.javiermartinart.com/

Javier Martin is a contemporary Spanish artist raised in Marbella, Spain. He currently lives and works in both Miami, Florida, and Marbella, Spain.

== Work ==
Javier Martin is a multidisciplinary artist who works in several mediums, including painting, collage, sculpture, performance art, and video art.

He was born in the small autonomous Spanish city of Ceuta, located on the Northern Coast of Africa, and raised in the South of Spain in the coastal city of Marbella. At the age of seven, he began painting in oil colors, he held his first exhibition at the age of eight, and won the CAJA Madrid Award for Young Artists by nine. Martin bypassed a traditional education as he began working at a young age, learning different trades. His art's background evolved from his personal experiences, and his travels, visiting museums and exhibitions around the world.

He began working and exhibiting his work throughout Spain. During the Summer of 2012, Martin participated in his first exhibition in Asia at Pantocrátor Gallery in Shanghai's M50 Art District, where he displayed a series of works from his 20-year career, including fashion inspired oil and collage portraits and provocative mixed media sculptures. By 2014 was represented by Matthew Liu Fine Art Gallery, based in Shanghai.

In the Fall of 2015, Martin presented "War, Consumption, and Other Human Hobbies" a solo exhibition at Valli Art Gallery in Miami. Showing several pieces from his Blindness Collection as well as a collection of works whose messages addressed themes of consumption and strategies of power within the global community.

In the Spring of 2016 during the week of Art Basel Hong Kong, Martin presented a solo show, Lies and Light, held in Loft 22 of the California Tower. Hong Kong Tatler states, "This show will continue Martin's exploration of notions of beauty and superficiality in an attempt to rediscover meaning and truth." Works including several of his LV Rifles – weapons composed of deconstructed Louis Vuitton bags- and pieces from his Blindness Collection were showcased alongside a video art piece entitled, Universe. He also presented his first performance piece, Lies and Light, this performance represents the latest evolution of the artist's Blindness Concept.

In the Spring of 2017, Martin was selected by Soho House New York as an Artist in Residence. In March 2017, during the week of Art Basel Hong Kong, Martin was a part of Art World Forum's panel entitled New Ways of Seeing, held at the Liang Yi Museum in Hong Kong.

=== Blindness Collection ===
For over a decade, Javier Martin has been developing his Blindness Concept. Throughout the series, Martin utilizes elements of Pop Art by appropriating elements of advertising and transforming images of models into 2-D paintings and collages. In each work, the eyes of his subject will always be concealed either behind a stroke of paint or neon light.
