= Arismendi Municipality, Sucre =

Arismendi Municipality Municipio Arismendi
- Municipality
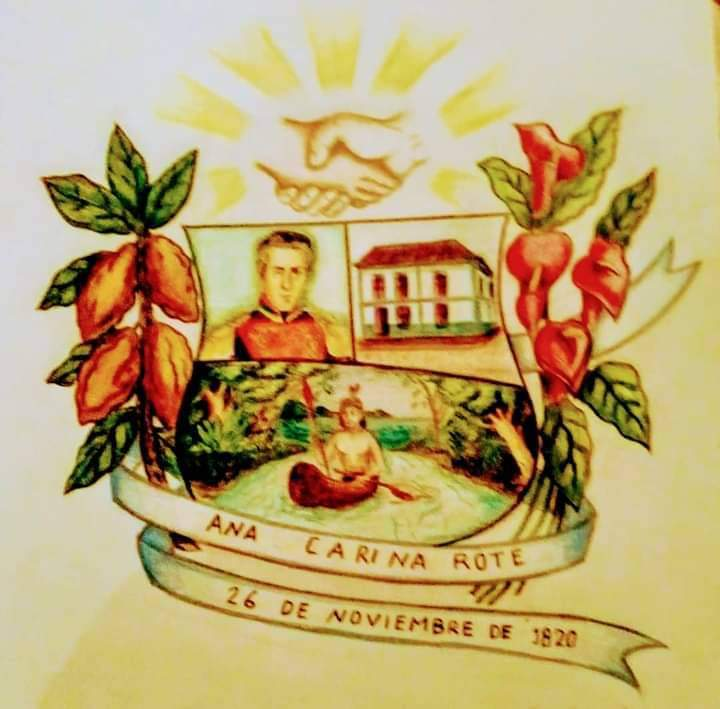
- Flag Coat of arms

- Location in Sucre

- Location in Venezuela
- Coordinates: 10°43′39″N 62°34′04″W
- Country: Venezuela
- State: Sucre
- Municipal seat: Río Caribe

Area
  - Total: 769 km^{2} (297 sq mi)
- Time zone: UTC−4 (VET)
- Website: Official website

Arismendi Blanco is a municipality of Sucre, Venezuela. It has five parishes, and the municipal seat is in Río Caribe. As of 2021, it has a population of 54,735.
