= Eduardo de la Puente =

Argentine journalist and television presenter

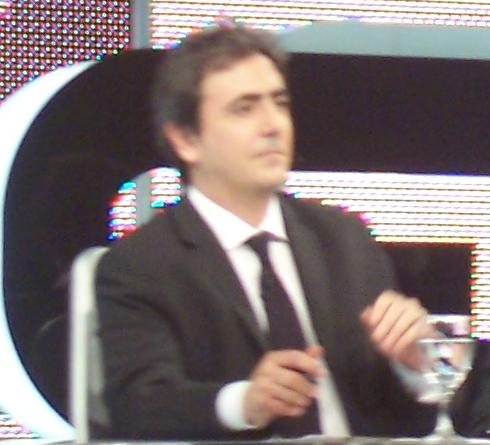
Eduardo de la Puente on Caiga Quien Caiga.

Eduardo de la Puente (born December 7, 1963, in Buenos Aires) is an Argentine journalist and television presenter. He hosted the television show Caiga Quien Caiga, broadcast on Telefé, until 2009.

De la Puente has worked as a producer and presenter in radio and television since the early 1980s. De la Puente was born in La Boca. He began his journalism career in program "El destape de Quilmes". He was a data musical redactor for the program "El puente". Then he was screenwriter and producer of "Música de cañerías" and "Los especiales de la Rock & Pop", artistic director of "FM Tropical" and conductor, producer and musical arranger of "Los especiales de Radio City", "La Rockola", "Con gusto a radio", "Boomerang" and "Parece mentira". Married with Ana Maria with which have an only son, Martin. Lives in Palermo, Buenos Aires, Argentine.

He makes up the program "¿Cuál es?" with Mario Pergolini and Marcelo Gantman.
