= José Ignacio García Hamilton =

Argentine writer, historian and politician

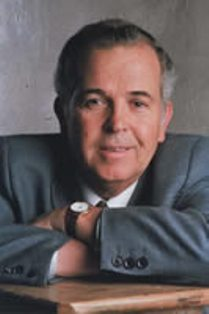
- Historian Jose Ignacio García Hamilton
- Born: November 1, 1943; Tucumán
- Died: June 17, 2009 (aged 65); Buenos Aires
- Education: Universidad de Tucumán (Law); University of Buenos Aires (PhD)
- Occupations: Lawyer, Historian, Writer
- Spouse: Graciela Gass
- Children: Bernabé, José, Julieta, Luis, Delfina, Manuel
- Writing career
- Pen name: Coché
- Language: Spanish
- Notable awards: Konex Award, Sousa Mendes International Award, among others
- Website: www.garciahamilton.com.ar

José Ignacio García Hamilton (1 November 1943 – 17 June 2009) was an Argentine writer, noted historian, lawyer and politician. He was elected to the Argentine Chamber of Deputies for the Radical Civic Union representing Tucumán Province.

== Biography ==
García Hamilton was born in San Miguel de Tucumán to Lucía Elena Aráoz and Enrique García Hamilton. He studied at the National University of Tucumán, graduating in 1969, and received his PhD in Legal and Social Sciences from the University of Buenos Aires, where he later was a Professor of history and law. He worked as a columnist and Secretary General of La Gaceta newspaper in Tucumán - which was owned by his family and edited by his father. He founded El Pueblo, a local newspaper, in 1972, and was named director of the Association of Provincial Newspapers; his brother, Eduardo, was also a prominent Tucumán journalist, serving as director of La Gaceta, and founder of Siglo XXI. In the mid-1970s, in the final months of the Presidency of Isabel Perón, he was imprisoned by the government. He was a columnist for newspapers and magazines in Argentina, Uruguay and the United States.

In 1975, after his release from prison and exile to Buenos Aires, García Hamilton initiated his career as a lawyer and founded García Hamilton & Asociados law firm. The firm has grown since then to become an advisory firm providing legal, tax and finance advisory services (GHB Advisory), and is now run by his sons.

García Hamilton was the author of numerous books, including Hispano-American authoritarianism and unproductiveness (1990), and biographies of Juan Bautista Alberdi, Life of an absentee (1993); Domingo Faustino Sarmiento, Rowdy Cuyano (1997), and José de San Martín, Don José (2000). Don José sold over 60,000 copies in Argentina. He won the Merit Diploma from the Konex Foundation for Life of an Absentee. He has presented several television programmes on Argentine history.

In 2006, he was deported from Cuba without explanation. García Hamilton suggested that his ongoing interest in the subject of authoritarianism in Latin American politics might have been responsible.

In 1991 García Hamilton ran as a candidate for vice-governor of Tucumán Province. In 2007 he was elected a national deputy for the province in support of the presidential bid of Roberto Lavagna. He later spoke out against Lavagna's return to the Kirchnerist fold.

He was vice-president of the interfaith NGO Casa Argentina en Jerusalem. In 2002, García Hamilton was awarded with the Sousa Mendes International Award, and in February 2010, the International Raoul Wallenberg Foundation issued a commemorative set of post stamps in his memory, to remember his dedication to interfaith dialogue and tolerance.

He was married to Graciela Gass, with whom he had six children. He died on 18 June 2009 after a ten-year-long battle with cancer.

== Bibliography ==
Los orígenes de nuestra cultura autoritaria. (Buenos Aires: Albino y Asociados, 1990)
Vida de un ausente: la novelesca biografía del talentoso seductor Juan Bautista Alberdi. (Buenos Aires: Editorial Sudamericana, 1993)
Cuyano alborotador: la vida de Domingo Faustino Sarmiento. (Buenos Aires: Editorial Sudamericana, 1997)
El autoritarismo hispanoamericano y la improductividad. (Buenos Aires: Editorial Sudamericana, 1998)
Don José: la vida de San Martín. (Buenos Aires: Editorial Sudamericana, 2000)
Simon: la vida de Simón Bolívar. (Buenos Aires: Editorial Sudamericana, 2004)
Por qué crecen los países. (Buenos Aires: Editorial Sudamericana, 2006)
Juan Domingo: Perón detrás del mito. (Buenos Aires: Editorial Sudamericana, 2009)
