= Helena Arizmendi =

Argentine opera singer

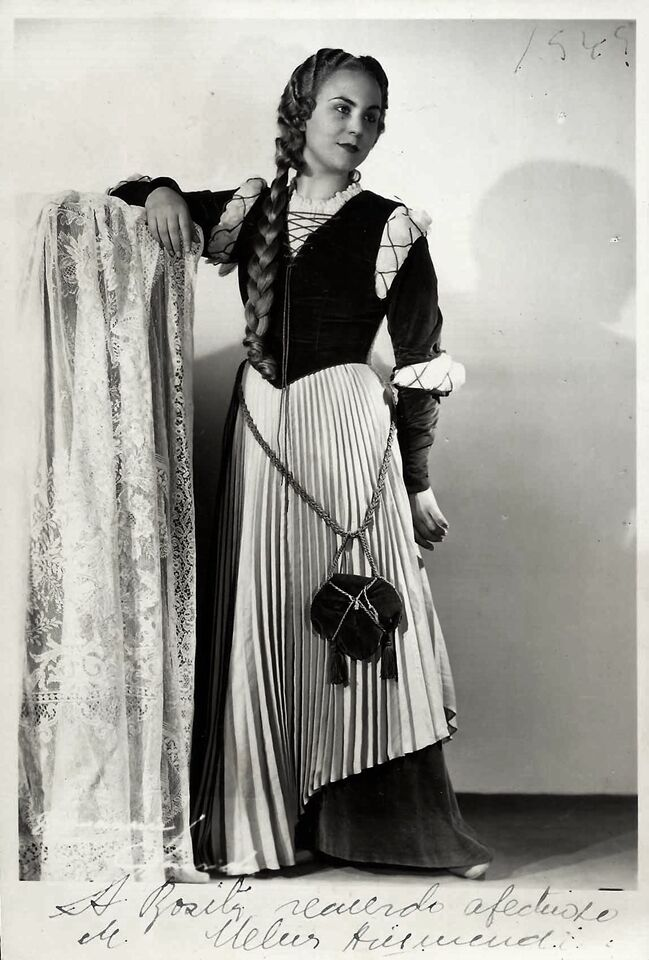
Helena Arizmendi (1949)

Helena Arizmendi (1924 or 1927–2015), sometimes featured as Elena Arizmendi, was an Argentine operatic soprano. A student of Maria Barrientos, she made her début in 1945 in Buenos Aires at the Teatro Colón where in 1948 she partnered Beniamino Gigli as Mimi in La Bohème. She was highly acclaimed for her performances in Italy which included La Scala. In 1989 she received the Konex Award.

== Biography ==
Although she claimed to have been born in 1927, other sources note that she was born 15 April 1924 in Avellaneda. As a child, Helena Arizmendi began singing popular songs with her mother while living in La Plata where her father was employed. She attended the Colegio de la Misericordia in Buenos Aires where she was a soloist in the choir.

In 1944, thanks to her good looks and composure, she was given a small singing part in Gólgota, a drama inspired by the Hungarian artist Lajos Vadja. Her talents were noticed by the celebrated Spanish soprano María Barrientos who took her in as a student until her death in August 1946. Thereafter she continued training under Luigi Ricci until she was able to attend the Teatro Colón opera school.

Arizmendi first sang at the Teatro Colón in 1945 in Gluck's Armida but her official début was in 1948 as Mimi in La Bohème, together with Gigli as Rodolfo. She went on to enjoy a highly successful career at the Colón in roles including Liu in Turandot partnering Maria Callas, Marguerite in Faust, Euridice in Orfeo ed Euridice and Rosaura in Le donne curiose.

In the early 1950s she sang in Italy, appearing at La Scala in the 1951–52 season as Serpina in Pergolesi's La serva padrona and as Susanna in Ermanno Wolf-Ferrari's Il segreto di Susanna.

Her recordings include her interpreting Mimi with Gigli in La Bohème and with Maria Callas and Mario del Monaco in Turandot.

Helena Arizmendi died on 1 February 2015.
