= Mario Pergolini =

Argentine journalist (born 1964)

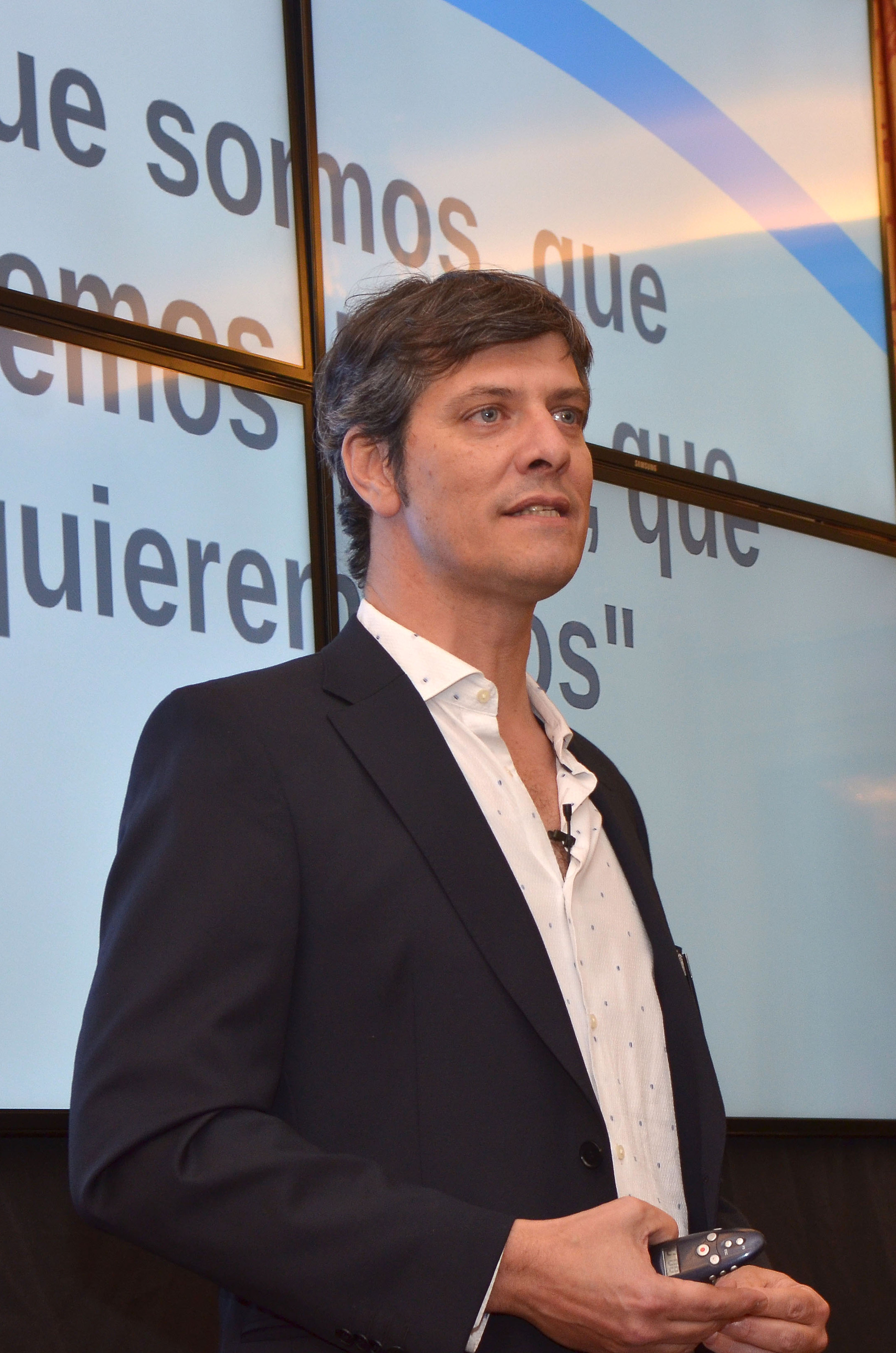
Pergolini in 2013

Mario Daniel Pergolini (born July 3, 1964, in Buenos Aires) is an Argentine journalist, media producer and businessman, best known as the former main host of the television show Caiga Quien Caiga (CQC) broadcast on Argentina's Telefe.

He started working at the Rock & Pop radio of Buenos Aires. He moved to TV as a secondary figure at Pepe Eliaschev's Cable a tierra and then Juan Alberto Badía's Badía y Compañía. In 1989 he hosted Rock and pop TV together with other radio figures. Probably his first successful TV shows were the teenager-rebel program La TV ataca (1991–1993) and Hacelo por mí (1992), but it was CQC (first aired in 1995) the most successful of them all.

Pergolini is the Argentine TV host seen introducing the Ramones in the documentary film End of the Century: The Story of the Ramones (2003).

In 1994 he created, together with partner Diego Guebel, Caito Lorenzo and Sebastian Melendez the Cuatro Cabezas (or 4K) TV production company, which is now one of the three most important media holdings in Argentina. He still hosts CQC and his radio show Cuál es? at Rock & Pop.

The CQC format has been sold to several countries (Chile, Brazil, Mexico, France, Italy, Spain, and Israel). The Israel TV version (anchored by Avri Gilad) did not catch with Israeli audiences and was discontinued after half a season.

Pergolini retired from CQC (and, as he said, from television) on 15 December 2008. His last episode did not include any special retrospective, but Pergolini criticized Telefe's management on the air (arguing that they cannot threaten him now) and joked with his colleagues Eduardo de la Puente (also retiring) and Juan Di Natale, who was still hosting CQC in 2009.

At late 2011, the rumors about the end of Pergolini's position at "¿Cuál Es?", the radio show that he hosted since 1989, and his leaving the Rock & Pop radio (where he was the main figure) got strong presence the media and was encouraged by his co workers at the radio.

Finally he left both positions (the show and the radio) and started up a new project: Vorterix, the continuation of the website of his radio show "cual es?" which already had the url vorterix.com since early 2011. Pergolini is leading this project which is integrated by a radio station (Vorterix Rock 103.1 FM), a Concert hall placed in the old "Teatro de Colegiales" and a website where the shows of the radio and the stage streams online in audio and video in HD quality.

The radio/show venue/website was officially launched at May 25, 2012, with a big event with live shows inside and outside the new "Vorterix Theater". But the transmissions really began at December 2011, and so did the new Pergolini's Show at Vorterix Rock, which started airing on February 1, 2012.

In December 2021, Pergolini was featured in "Demian", the fourth track of Argentine rapper and singer Dillom's debut studio album, "Post Mortem".
