= Os Fatos Espetaculares de 2012 =

- Directed by: Pablo Mazover
- Starring: Marcelo Adnet; Carlos Eduardo Miranda; Dani Calabresa; Ricardo Boechat; José Ferreira Neto; Alexandre Frota; Denilson; Chiquinho Scarpa; Evandro Santo; Marvio Lúcio
- Narrated by: Emilio Surita
- Production company: Eyeworks
- Distributed by: Band
- Release date: December 18, 2012
- Running time: 75 minutes
- Country: Brazil

Os Fatos Espetaculares de 2012 was a year-end special that aired on TV Band on December 18, 2012. It was hosted by comedian Danilo Gentili and featured a large cast from the network.

== Format ==
Host Danilo Gentili, the project's creator, presided over a game show featuring questions and answers about the most notable events of 2012.

The special was announced on December 17, 2012, by the host.

== Cast ==
=== Teams ===
Team Name	Guests	Occupation (at the time)
Chupa Neto	Ricardo Boechat Dani Calabresa	Host – Jornal da Band Comedian- Comédia MTV – MTV
Miramar Silva	Marcelo Adnet Carlos Eduardo Miranda	Comedian- Adnet Viaja, Comédia MTV – MTV Musician – Astros – SBT
Guerreiros	Alexandre Frota José Ferreira Neto	Director of TV – Rede Brasil Commentator – Os Donos da Bola – Band

=== Advisors ===
- Vinicius Gomez (Gominho) – Pânico na Band – Band
- Denilson – Deu Olé – Band
- Roger Moreira – Agora É Tarde e Ultraje a Rigor

=== Special Guests ===
- Léo Lins – Agora É Tarde – Band
- Márvio Lúcio – Pânico na Band – Band
- Milton Neves – Terceiro Tempo – Band
- Chiquinho Scarpa – Business Person
- Mauricio Meireles – CQC – Band
- Marcelo Mansfield – Agora É Tarde – Band
- Oscar Filho – CQC – Band
- Marco Gonçalves – Saturday Night Live – Rede TV
- Sandy – cantora
- Adriane Galisteu – Presenter – Band
- Evandro Santo – Pânico na Band – Band
