= The Noite com Danilo Gentili =

Brazilian late-night talk show

- Genre: Talk show
- Created by: Danilo Gentili
- Written by: Leandro FS (head writer); Bárbara Costa; Daniel Duncan; Fernando Castaño; Maiara Corrêa; Rafael Marinho; Yuri M.
- Directed by: João Mesquita
- Presented by: Danilo Gentili
- Starring: Bacalhau; Juliana Oliveira; Marcos Kleine; Roger Moreira; Andria Busic; Igor Guimarães
- Narrated by: Diguinho Coruja
- Theme music composer: Ultraje a Rigor
- Opening theme: "Tema de Abertura do The Noite" by Ultraje a Rigor
- Composer: Roger Moreira
- Country of origin: Brazil
- Original language: Portuguese
- No. of seasons: 11
- No. of episodes: 932

Production
- Executive producer: Simone Iorio
- Producers: Allan Hupp; Bruno Santa; Caio Cipó; Camila Quesada; Deborah Villalva; João Cassiano; Mayara Lettieri; Melissa Ely; Pedro Machado; Rassios Miranda
- Camera setup: Multi-camera
- Running time: 60 minutes

Original release
- Network: SBT
- Release: March 10, 2014 – present

Related
- Agora É Tarde com Danilo Gentili

The Noite com Danilo Gentili (English: Overnight with Danilo Gentili (Note: The name of the show is a pun. Host and creator Danilo Gentili choose to put the word "The" in the title because it sounds like the Portuguese word "De", making, this way, "The Noite" sounding like "De Noite", which means "Overnight", in English.)) is a Brazilian television program hosted by the stand-up comedian Danilo Gentili, which is currently produced and broadcast by SBT. Gentili previously hosted Agora É Tarde for about three years on Band network. Danilo's departure from Band and move to SBT was due to conflicts with the producer of his former show, Eyeworks, and with restrictions that the networks wanted to place on the show.

The show is a late-night talk show, as it features the presence of a comedian as a host and is broadcast in the late night schedule. The show debuted on March 10, 2014, and since then the program airs during the weekdays around one in the morning, after the primetime shows. The show is taped in the SBT studios located at Osasco, city of Greater São Paulo, where the network's headquarters are located.

In addition to having Gentili as host, the stand-up comedians Léo Lins and Murilo Couto are cast members of the show, which also includes the announcer Diguinho Coruja, the stage assistant Juliana Oliveira and four members of the show house band, Ultraje a Rigor: Roger Moreira (vocal), Mingau (bass), Marcos Kleine (guitar) and Bacalhau (drums). The soundtrack played by Ultraje a Rigor in the show was released as a digital album called Por que Ultraje a Rigor?, Vol. 2.

== Background ==
=== Creation and debut of Agora É Tarde ===
In 2008, during one of his presentations of the Clube da Comédia, a stand-up comedy show, Danilo Gentili was invited by Diego Barreto to make the segment Repórter Inexperiente on the new Band network show, Custe o Que Custar (CQC). With success of the segment, Gentili became an official reporter of the show.

In the next year, Gentili presented to Band direction a project of late-night talk show created by him and Alex Baldin, who at that time was the CQC head of script. In this project, the show already had its name, Agora É Tarde, Ultraje a Rigor as the house band, and the comedians Léo Lins and Murilo Couto in the show cast. To force the channel to air the show, Gentili demanded that the network record a pilot of the show as a condition for his contract renewal. The station only allowed the pilot recording in 2010, and chose the producer Eyeworks, owner of CQC format, to produce the show.

Agora É Tarde premiered on June 29, 2011, initially broadcast two times per week. Seeing the success of the show, which greatly increased the network audience, the broadcast days have been increased, causing the show to be aired four days per week.

=== Departure from Band ===
In December 2013, Band was experiencing a financial restructuring, causing a decrease in the show run time, losing a day broadcast for a rerun of the show best moments, also decreasing the Agora É Tarde staff as a way to cut costs. After receiving a proposal from SBT, where they would remove the limitations that Band placed on the show, the staff decided to accept it in a consensus decision.

Even though he promised to leave Band to go to SBT along the other cast members, the narrator Marcelo Mansfield, refused to move to SBT, and decided to continue on Band. Mansfield explained that chose to continue on Band because he never broke a contract during his career and he would not join the show cast without all its original formation. Contrary to his own words, Mansfield remained on the show, which had comedian Rafinha Bastos as its new host.

With the move to SBT, Band and producer Eyeworks began to treat them as enemies. Not having a narrator, since Mansfield remained on Band, Gentili chose the radio host Diguinho Coruja to replace Mansfield as the show narrator. With the announcement of his hiring by SBT, Coruja was dismissed from the radio station Band FM, which belongs to the same owners of Band network, the Grupo Bandeirantes de Comunicação. Band filed a lawsuit against Gentili, in which they demanded that the host returns to the station and also trying to prevent the debut of its show on SBT, also defining themselves as the creators of the show format. The case was dismissed by the justice.
