= Public display of affection =

Acts of physical intimacy in the view of others

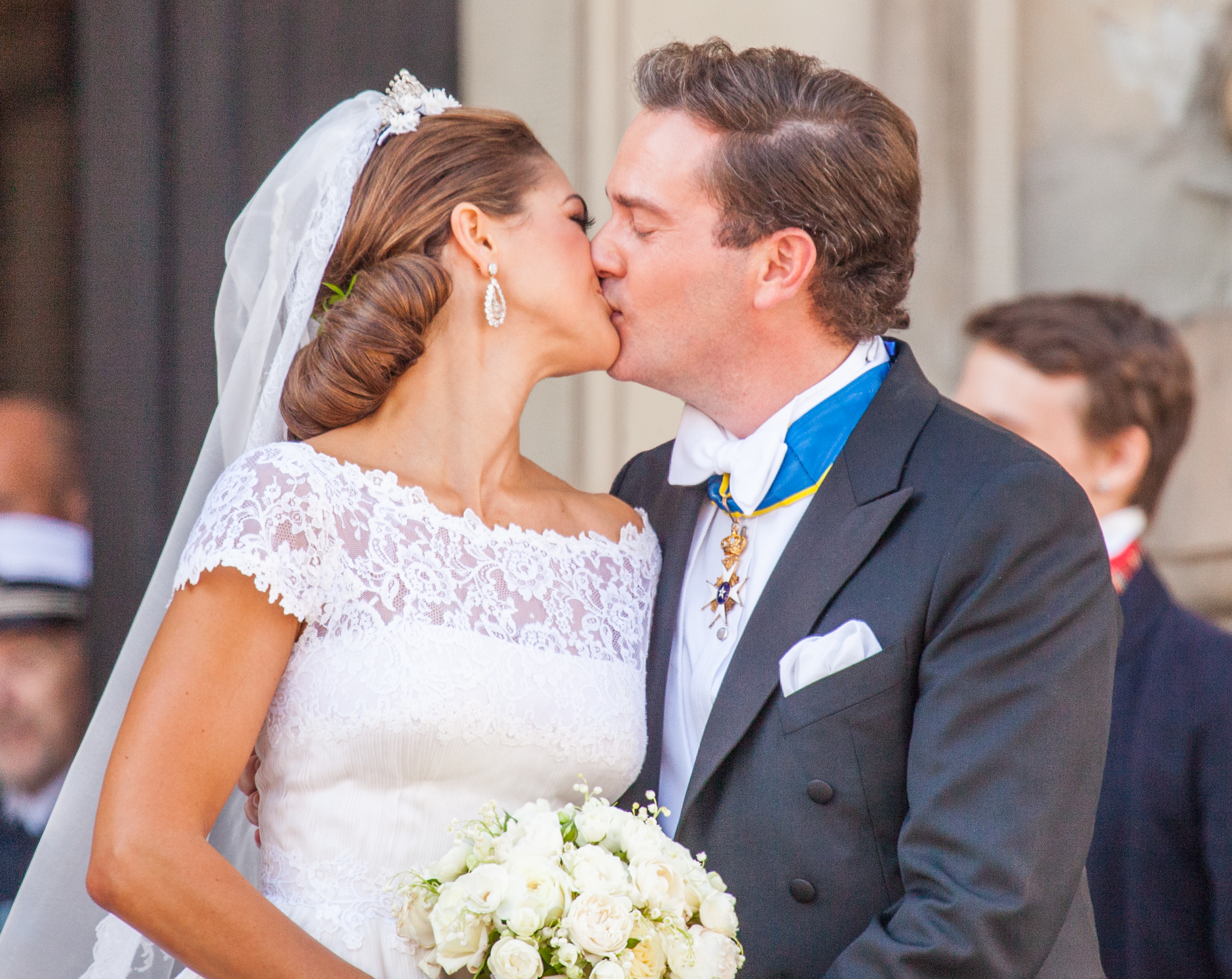
Wedding kiss: Princess Madeleine of Sweden and Christopher O'Neill kiss each other after their wedding, 2013

Public displays of affection (PDA) are acts of physical intimacy in the view of others. What is considered to be an acceptable display of affection varies with respect to culture and context.

Some organizations have rules limiting or prohibiting public displays of affection. Displays of affection in a public place, such as the street, are more likely to be objected to, than similar practices in a private place with only people from a similar cultural background present.

== Worldwide ==
=== China ===
Historically, Chinese culture has regarded the overwhelming majority of physical contact between opposite sexes as unacceptable. The earliest iconic record of such view is Mencius: Li Lou I (孟子 · 離婁上, written in the Warring States Period), in which Mencius (Chinese: 孟子), a Confucian scholar and philosopher, states that it is "etiquette that the two sexes shall not allow their hands to touch in giving or receiving anything" (Chinese: 男女授受不親), a view that is still prevalent today. Younger generations in more developed parts of China are less afraid of displaying their affections towards their partners in public (partially affected by the influence of Western culture). It is common to see males and females holding hands or wearing coordinated outfits in urbanized cities, with some commentators suggesting "mass availability of condoms and hyper-sexualized advertisements" as the cause for China's increasing acceptance of PDA. However, traditional ideals still have a strong influence on social norms of relatively remote regions.

In the first few decades of the 21st century, Chinese netizens coined the expression 秀恩爱 (pinyin: xiù ēn'ài; lit. 'to show off love and affection') for public display of affection. The neologism quickly popularized and gained the connotation of "being lovey-dovey to piss off single people." According to a 2004 research by Weiyi Zhang, a researcher from Fudan University, the dissemination of PDA culture in China is largely ascribed to an ultramodern desire to gain public recognition and reality confirmation.

Mothers from the Manchu minority ethnic group, as only researched in the 1900s in Aigun of Northern Manchuria where the researcher S. M. Shirokogoroff personally believed the Manchu element were "purer" than those of Southern Manchuria and Peking (now Beijing), used to show affection for their children by performing fellatio on their male babies, placing the penis in their mouths and stimulating it, while they regarded public kissing with revulsion.

=== India ===
Public display of affection might be regarded as socially unacceptable in India if it disturbs others or creates nuisance. Same-sex physical contact is allowed. Under section 294 of the Indian Penal Code, causing annoyance to others through "obscene acts" is a criminal offence with a punishment of imprisonment up to three months or a fine, or both.

For example, in 2007, when Richard Gere kissed Shilpa Shetty on her cheeks on a live broadcast as part of an AIDS awareness campaign, a complaint was registered against both the actors resulting in a local court issuing an arrest warrant for Richard Gere which was cleared in 2008 by the Supreme Court of India terming the ruling as 'cheap publicity' while the case involving the actress for 'failure to deny his advances' was dismissed in 2022, 15 years after the incident, with the court describing the actress as a "victim of unwanted advances". Since the concerning sections of law leaves to the discretion of the courts in deciding what constitutes as indecent, despite assertions that kissing in public is not obscene in many such landmark cases by the Supreme Court of India, it continues to be in use to rule against such cases. In the state of Kerala, a public kissing display named Kiss of Love was held in November 2014 in protest against moral policing.

=== Middle East ===
Middle Eastern countries such as Iraq, Saudi Arabia, Jordan and Egypt are predominantly Muslim cultures. Although public displays of affection generally do not fit the local culture and customs, it varies even among these countries. Decency laws do not allow public displays of affection. Penalties can be severe based on the action in different countries.

For example, travelers to Dubai have been given jail sentences for kissing in public. In 2009 a British couple caught publicly kissing in Dubai were sentenced to deportation following a three-month prison sentence. An unmarried Indian couple, who were in a taxi, were sentenced to one year in prison for hugging and kissing. The taxi driver drove the couple directly to a police station. Kissing is considered "an offence to public decency".

=== Western world ===
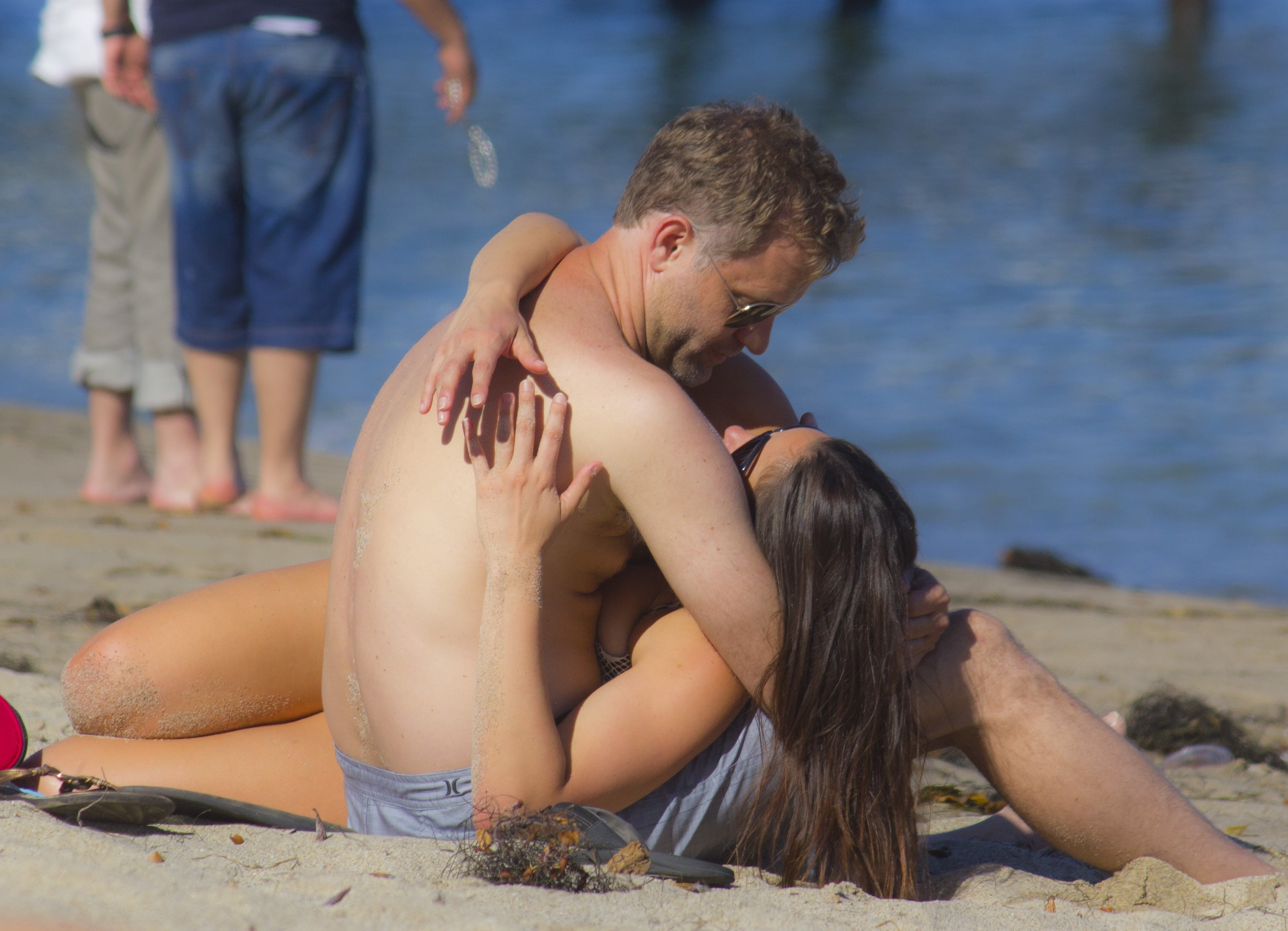
A couple hugging at a beach in the United States

In most of the Western world, such as Western Europe, Australia, New Zealand, Canada, the United States, and Latin America, public displays of affection such as holding hands, hugging, and occasionally kissing are generally common. However, attitudes vary among couples, with some feeling comfortable expressing affection openly, while others prefer to refrain from doing so.

== Demographics ==
=== Religions ===
Religiosity is an important factor that influences how romantic relationships develop. In many regions of the world, religion drives the cultural view on PDA and this sometimes culminates into proscription based on religious rules. Examples of such are sharia law, Catholic and Evangelical virginity pledges, Anabaptist plain people, Methodist outward holiness, Quaker testimony of simplicity, Latter-day Saint Law of chastity and Judaic Tzniut. The conservative Islamic schools of thought, especially Salafism-oriented ones, forbid public displays of affection.

=== Adolescence ===
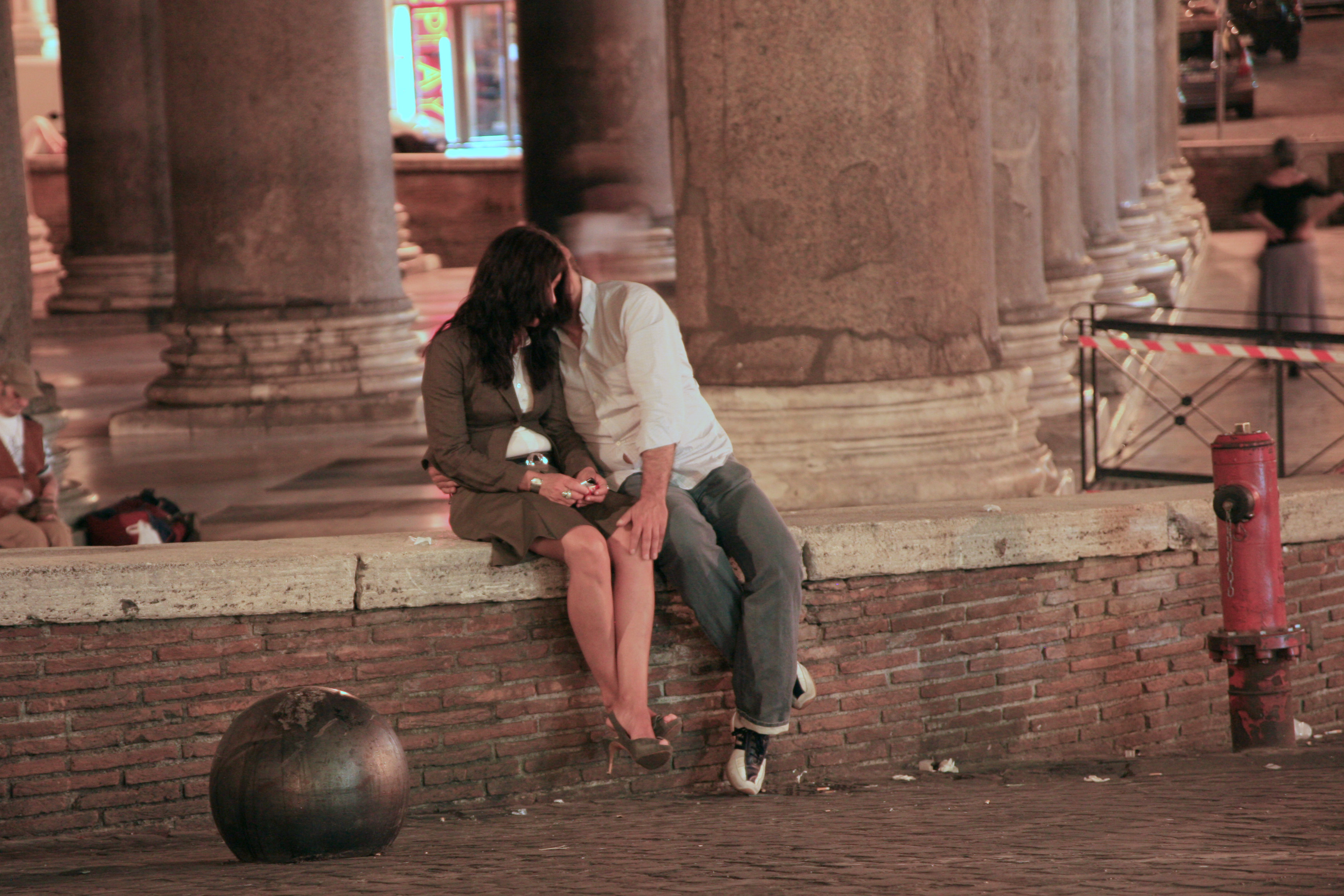
A young couple indulging in public in Rome

Relationships outside the family become increasingly important during adolescence. Although several studies of basic social processes have been conducted by sociologists, much of the research and theorizing about adolescent relationships has been carried out by developmental psychologists. Much more research has been done in the area of specific adolescent behaviors, which has shown that these behaviors are predicted well by relationship variables to include the display of affection.

Affection or intimacy references a pattern of conduct within relationships that includes subjective assessments of attachment. This pattern of conduct is a part of a larger constellation of factors that contributes to an adolescent's development of a non-parental relationship. Sociologists have explored the more general terrain of gender relations, although several of the key studies focus on preadolescence and early adolescence. Their work highlights the degree to which features of these early relations, and even intense personal feelings such as being in love, are socially constructed. Adolescents' conceptions about and conduct within these relationships are heavily influenced by interaction and communication with others. Specific rules emerge (e.g., one should always be in love, it is wrong to date more than one person) and gossip or other social sanctions serve as important sources of informal social control around these rules.

Research moves into the early adolescent period when youths are old enough to say they are going steady and is useful in actually characterizing the nature of these relationships. These liaisons are described as highly superficial and based on unrealistic idealised expectations. Furthermore, the desire of adolescents to put on a good "front" inhibits the development of intimacy. Going steady is a limiting factor on the adolescent social ritual.

Children of the opposite sex begin the process of relating to one another, the transition is much easier for adolescent males, who essentially transport their dominant interaction styles (derived from peer interactions) into this new relationship form with the opposite sex. Public displays of affection may facilitate the demonstration of this dominant interaction style transference in a socially acceptable way.

Experimental research on communication processes observed in same- and mixed-gender groups to support this idea. Although behavior observed in cross-gender task groups is relevant, intimate dyadic relationships and task groups are not equivalent social contexts. Thus, an alternative hypothesis is that boys, who have less practice than their female counterparts with PDA (by virtue of their peer group experiences), must make a larger developmental leap as they move into the heterosexual arena. For example, examining the messages students write one another in high-school yearbooks, there were marked differences between boys' discourse directed towards friends (e.g., "you're a lousy wrestler…") and that directed towards romantic partners (e.g., "you are very beautiful in so many ways, it would take me a lifetime to express them in words…"). In contrast, young girls' use of language in messages to close friends and boyfriends is more similar in form and content. To the degree that the romantic context provides their only opportunity to express themselves and, more broadly, to relate in this intimate fashion, young males are more dependent on these relations than female adolescents, who have close friends for intimate talk and social support. This uniqueness figures into the aetiology of more negative and sometimes gendered relational dynamics that also emerge in connection with romantic involvements stalking, intrusive control efforts, violence, and the like.

=== Same-sex ===
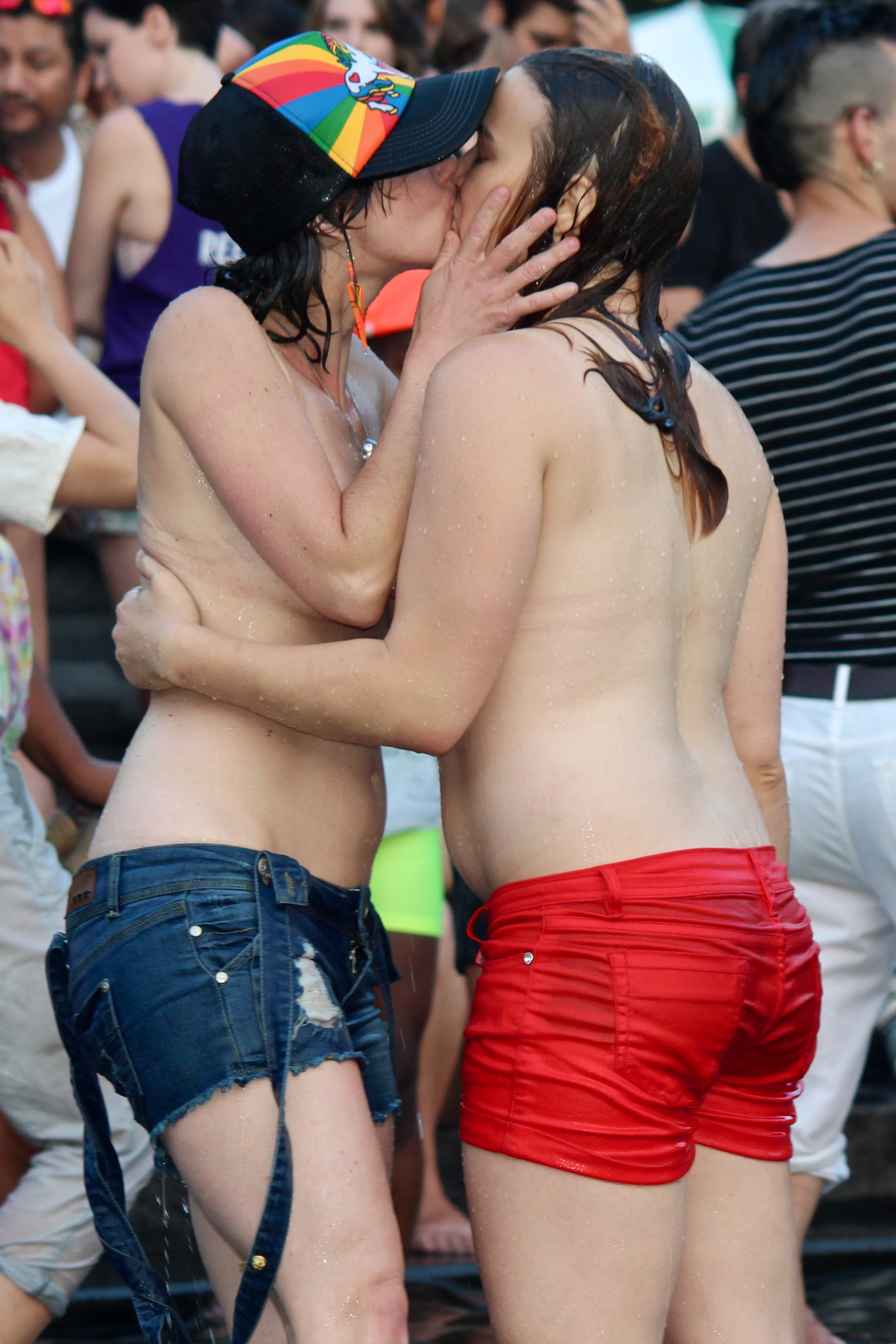
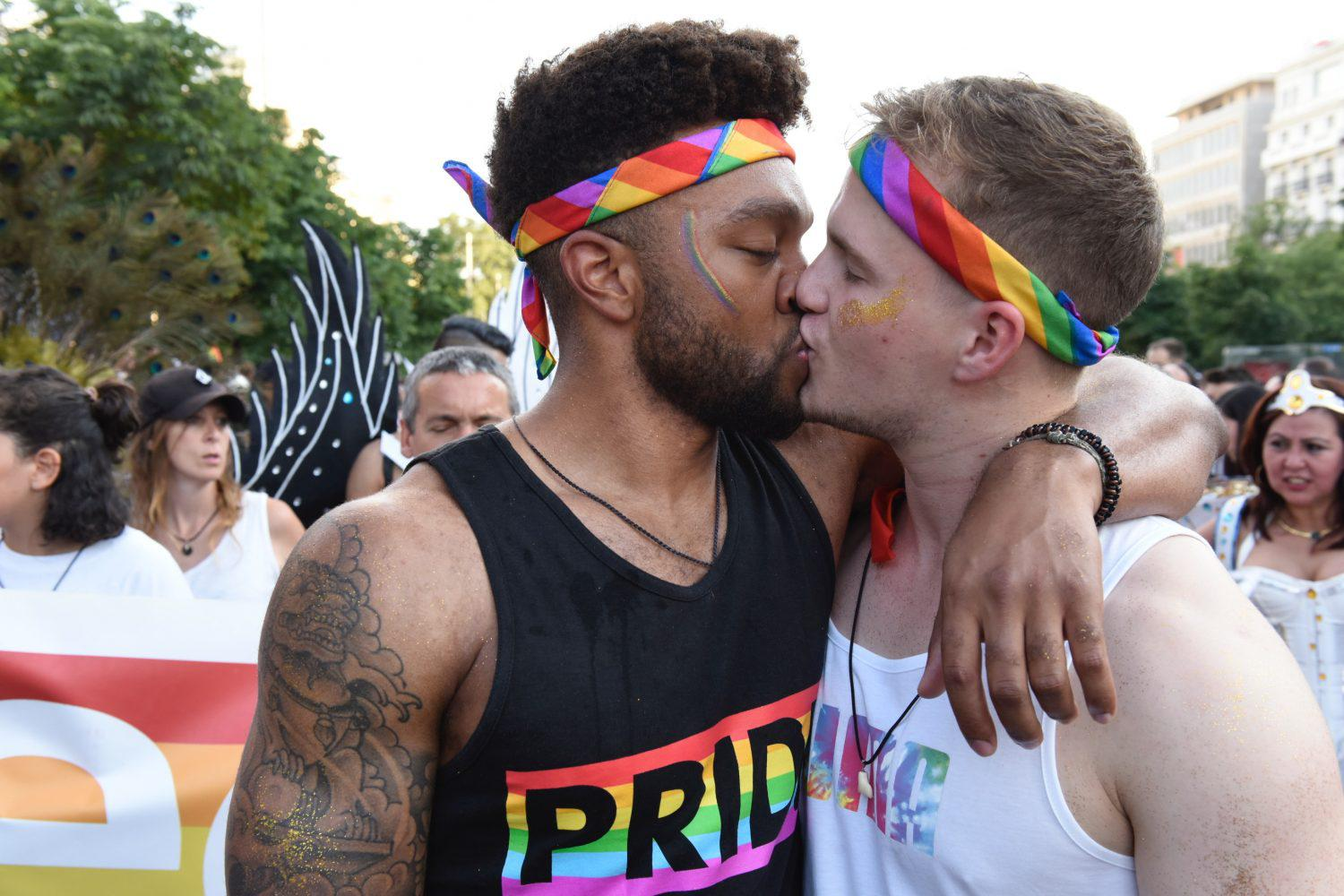
Top: Two topless women hug and kiss each other in public during New York City's Dyke March, a visibility march for lesbians. Bottom: Two gay men kiss in public.

Public displays of affection between individuals of the same sex may (or may not) suggest homosexuality depending on the cultural context. For example, in many African cultures it is socially acceptable for people of the same sex to participate in public displays of affection, whereas in other countries such as the United States and Portugal, it is considered to be indicative of homosexuality.

In the contemporary Western society, attitudes towards same-sex public displays of affection vary across cities much like they vary across countries. In populations where the majority of individuals have high cultural values and are more accommodating, same-sex or same-gender public displays of affection are more likely to occur.

Intolerance for homosexual PDA is commonplace in large swathes of society in many different cultures. For instance, in Portugal, LGBT individuals are less likely to partake in public displays of affection because their society is extremely critical of the act. They believe that by behaving according to what society deems appropriate, (e.g., only opposite-sex couples should partake in acts of public displays of affection), they are protecting themselves from being categorized as abnormal, odd, or deviant. Although same-sex marriage has been legal in Portugal since June 2010 (see Same-sex marriage in Portugal), Queer individuals still refrain from public displays of affection for the most part.

In a Colorado high school, two yearbook staff resigned after they were informed that they could not print the relationship page because it had a photo of two young women holding hands. A spokesman for the New York City Gay and Lesbian Anti-Violence Project declared in 2007 that "people are still verbally harassed and physically attacked daily for engaging in simple displays of affection in public. Everything changes the minute we kiss".

== Social media ==
Expression of a person's feelings towards someone else had previously been limited to written letters, phone calls, or in person. In the modern world, social media sites such as Facebook and Twitter are growing, with 1.7 billion users on Facebook and over half a billion Twitter users. Studies on relationships through Facebook found that, when two individuals who are interested in one another both use Facebook regularly, their relationship progresses in different increments than it would without social media. After two people meet and form an interest, one or both individuals will go on to the other person's Facebook page and get information such as relationship status, pictures, and interests. Once a relationship begins, some couples broadcast their relationship with posts, such as pictures and changing the relationship status.

How people show their public displays of affection on social media sites can be indicative of relationship security and personality. Frequent and recent communication with a romantic partner through different forms of social media is an indicator of relational escalation, whereas limited communication has shown to be an indicator of alienation or relational de-escalation. Another study has shown that when someone focuses on relationship status and public displays of affection such as posting about activities with the significant other or their feelings towards them, that person tends to be more possessive or territorial over their partner.

A study found female characters on prime-time television programs are less likely to demonstrate physical affection if they had a larger body type than thinner female characters. Thus, even television producers act in a way as to intentionally limit public displays of affection based on the appearance of their actors, and that might affect viewership based on social disapproval. Regardless of television portrayals, the frequency and intensity of PDA has a tendency to depend upon the cultural context as well as perceived public perceptions of the couple, including their age group, racial composition, sexuality, and relationship centralized activity on social media.

== Effects on romantic relationships ==
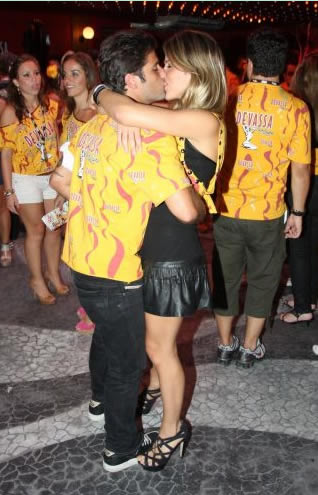
Brazilian actors Bruno Gagliasso and Giovanna Ewbank, who are married, kiss and hug each other publicly while dancing, 2010.

Studies have found physical affection to be associated with positive outcomes in romantic relationships. For instance, it has been related to the formation of attachment bonds and psychological intimacy.

== See also ==
- Friendship
- Indecent exposure
- Interpersonal relationship
- Intimacy
- Intimate relationship
- Norm (sociology)
- Platonic love
- Public sex
