= Thiago Gagliasso =

Brazilian politician (born 1989)

- Gagliasso in 2022

Member-elect of the Chamber of Deputies
- Assuming office 1 February 2027
- Constituency: Rio de Janeiro

Member of the Legislative Assembly of Rio de Janeiro
- Incumbent
- Assumed office 1 February 2023
- Constituency: At-large

Personal details
- Born: Thiago Gagliasso Onofre Ferreira; 9 June 1989 (age 37) Rio de Janeiro, Brazil
- Party: PL (since 2022)
- Other political affiliations: PSDB (2020); PSL (2020–2021); PTB (2021–2022)
- Relatives: Bruno Gagliasso (brother); Giovanna Ewbank (sister-in-law)

Thiago Gagliasso Onofre Ferreira (born 9 June 1989) is a Brazilian actor and politician serving as a member of the Legislative Assembly of Rio de Janeiro since 2023. He is the brother of Bruno Gagliasso and the brother-in-law of Giovanna Ewbank.
