= Thais Carla =

Brazilian influencer and activist

- Born: Thais Carla da Rocha dos Santos; 15 October 1991 (age 34); Nova Iguaçu, Rio de Janeiro, Brazil
- Occupations: Dancer, choreographer, digital influencer, activist, singer
- Known for: Activism against fat shaming
- Spouse: Israel Reis (married 2016–present)
- Children: 2
- Awards: MTV Millennial Awards

Thais Carla da Rocha dos Santos (born 15 October 1991) is a Brazilian digital influencer, activist, dancer, choreographer, ballet dancer and singer. She is known for her activism against the social stigma of obesity, including her involvement in legal actions addressing fat-shaming attacks and unauthorized use of her image.

== Biography and career ==
Thais Carla da Rocha dos Santos was born in Nova Iguaçu, Rio de Janeiro, on 15 October 1991. From the age of four to sixteen, she studied classical ballet. At fourteen, she founded, alongside her sister, the dance academy Academia Studio de Dança Simone Rocha. In 2009, she participated in the segment Se Vira nos 30 on the program Domingão do Faustão, broadcast by TV Globo, and won a prize of R$15,000 for dancing a hip hop song. Since then, she has appeared in various programs such as Eliana, Programa Raul Gil, and O Melhor do Brasil.

In 2012, she joined the ballet of the program Legendários, where she was nicknamed "Gordinha Esquema" (lit. 'Chubby Scheme') and remained there for about four years. An article by OFuxico at the time described her as a "highlight" and a "success" of the program. In 2015, she participated in Além do Peso. From 2017 to 2019, she was part of the dance crew of singer Anitta. Since then, she has become a notable figure in the VIP boxes during Carnival, including in Salvador.

On 18 November 2021, she participated in the São Paulo Fashion Week. In January 2022, she launched a mini-collection of curtain bikinis for plus-sized individuals. Santos is also a partner and owner of Alitasex, a brand of sensual products featuring an exclusive line of lingeries and costumes for plus-sized individuals. On 5 January 2024, Santos announced her career as a singer by releasing her first song, "Não Pode Opinar".

=== Lawsuits ===
Santos constantly receives fat-shaming attacks from Internet users. According to her, legal action is the way to combat these attacks: "those who slander me hinder my work". In October 2021, comedian Léo Lins was ordered to pay R$5,000 for moral damages in a lawsuit that Santos filed against him for fat shaming. She said: "He ridiculed me with various prejudiced and fatphobic phrases. This was the first time that a judge directly upheld the conviction for the violation of fatphobia in the foreground, which is an excellent win for all fat people." In March 2022, she won a court injunction forcing presenter Danilo Gentili to delete photos of the dancer from his social networks—she had filed a lawsuit for fat shaming, hedonic damages and misuse of the images in the posts.

Santos sued filmmaker Pietro Krauss for using her image without authorization, after which she was repeatedly harassed in the comments. As well as asking for the video to be deleted, under penalty of a fine, the influencer asked for R$15,000 in damages. In September 2022, the court denied Santos's request for a preliminary injunction and kept the video on the air. On 20 September 2024, the lawsuit was dismissed on the grounds that the video addressed a topic of public interest and was not personally offensive. Santos appealed on the grounds of lack of resources, but the Bahia Court of Justice upheld the decision, recognizing Pietro's freedom of speech. In the second instance, Santos suffered another defeat, and the decision was upheld. She was ordered to pay a fee of 20% of the value of the case, suspended due to free legal aid.

In May 2022, she announced that she had sued nursing technician Letícia Bastos, who had criticized some of her statements about fat shaming. On November 25, the specialist was ordered to pay R$4,000. A month later, the parties reached an agreement to define the form of payment. However, the nurse lied on her social networks saying that she had won the case.

On 5 February 2023, days before Carnival, Santos posted on social media a photo of herself dressed as Globeleza. The Bolsonarist federal deputy Nikolas Ferreira responded: "They took away the beauty, and only Globo was left". Because of the post, he was accused of fat shaming. After the criticism, he recorded an ironic video saying: "What was I thinking calling a fat woman fat? I should have treated obesity as romance, as empowerment, not as a disease. Since when, in the 21st century, is having your own opinion a thing, right?". She then posted a photo in which she simulates her own face on a fat body and wrote: "Okay, now I have a place to speak". Santos' lawyers informed her that they were going to sue the congressman for R$52,000 in damages for moral harm and improper use of her image. In October 2024, the Bahia Public Prosecutor's Office initiated a case against Santos for her involvement in promoting games of chance through her social media platforms.

== Personal life ==
Santos is known for her activism in favor of fat people and her fight against the social stigma of obesity. On social media, she posts bikini photos and shows self-esteem, aiming to encourage fat women to body positivity. Santos has been married to photographer Israel Reis since 2016 and has two daughters. She lived in Salvador with her family until 2021, when she moved at the end of the year to the interior of São Paulo to be closer to her store. In May 2022, he announced that he would be returning to Bahia.

== Awards and nominations ==
Year	Award	Category	Result	Ref.
2022	MTV Millennial Awards	Saúde Tá Ok	Won	
