= Léo Lins =

Brazilian comedian (born 1982)

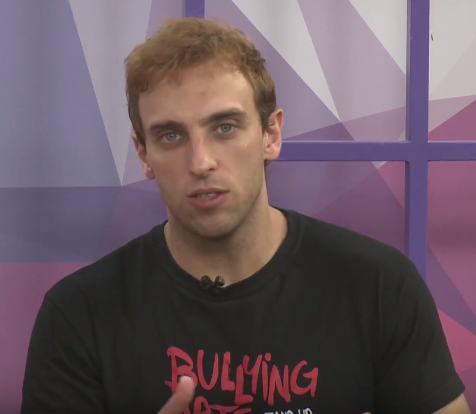
- Léo Lins in 2018
- Born: Leonardo de Lima Borges Lins; September 3, 1982 (age 44); Rio de Janeiro, Brazil
- Occupation: Stand-up comedian · writer

Comedy career
- Years active: 2005–present
- Medium: Stand-up · television · YouTube
- Genre: Black comedy

Leonardo de Lima Borges Lins (born September 3, 1982) is a Brazilian stand-up comedian and writer. Known as the "king of black humor," his comedy has an acidic, aggressive and transgressive style and often mocks vulnerable groups and minorities, such as people with disabilities, the elderly, homossexuals, HIV-positive people, Northeastern Brazilians, Afro-Brazilians, and religious minorities. His career is marked by a long list of lawsuits, which culminated in his conviction to 8 years in prison in June 2025; however, he was acquitted in February 2026.

== Biography and career ==
Lins was born in Rio de Janeiro on September 3, 1982. He began his stand-up comedy career in 2005 working on magic shows, creating the show Pão e Circo, and later became a member of Comédia em Pé, the first stand-up group in Brazil. He wrote the first book about stand-up comedy published in Brazil, Notas de um Comediante Stand-up (2009), and Segredos da Comédia Stand-up (2014).

Léo Lins gained national fame in 2008 when he participated in the Quem Chega Lá segment on Domingão do Faustão, a competition that introduced new comedians to the public, and he became a finalist. In 2010, he joined the program Legendários on Record, then hosted by Marcos Mion, as a writer. Between 2011 and 2013, he became part of the talk show Agora É Tarde, hosted by Danilo Gentili. When Gentili moved to SBT at the end of 2013 to host The Noite, Lins followed him, remaining on the show until leaving in 2022, after being fired by the network for making a joke about a child with hydrocephalus.

Léo Lins played Fred in the horror comedy film Exterminadores do Além contra a Loira do Banheiro in 2018 and Capitão Jair in the film No Gogó do Paulinho in 2020.

== Controversies ==
In 2013, his visa to Japan was canceled after the release of a video that mixed tragic images of the 2011 tsunami in the Asian country with excerpts from a comedy show performed by the comedian two years earlier, featuring jokes about the topic. In retaliation, a Facebook page run by the Brazilian community in Japan started posting videos that mixed jokes from Lins' 2011 show with images of dead people and devastated locations, set to sad background music. The comedian also received death threats online.

In 2021, Léo Lins was ordered to pay R$5,000 to Thais Carla for the unauthorized use of her image. According to Thais Carla, Lins had mocked her YouTube video about how airplane seats are not adapted to fat people. In 2025, the comedian again mocked Carla during a competition of people with "unusual" talents at his stand-up show. When he heard that one of the competitors knew how to fold panties, Lins said: "Thais Carla's panties, you can make a sculpture of a city and display it at the city's entrance".

In 2023, Léo Lins was ordered by the Court of Justice of São Paulo to remove his stand-up show entitled "Pertubador" from YouTube, where, according to the court decision, Lins makes "hateful, prejudiced and discriminatory comments against minorities and vulnerable groups". Lins was prohibited from leaving São Paulo, where he lives, for more than 10 days. His team said in a statement that the comedian considers the decision "censorship". The same show led to him being sentenced in June 2025 to 8 years in prison; however, he was acquitted in February 2026 by the Federal Regional Court of the 3rd Region on the grounds that his statements did not constitute a criminal offense due to lack of specific intent.

In July 2025, Léo Lins made a joke about the death of singer Preta Gil at the Teatro Eduardo Kraichete in Niterói, when he said that all the people who had sued him "ended up getting screwed in some way." When the audience mentioned Preta Gil, who had passed away from intestinal cancer, he said, "whoever comes to sue me will get cancer and die". Due to the widespread negative backlash, he said in a YouTube video that the jokes mentioning the artist were written two years earlier, during the period when she was beginning her cancer treatment, and were related to legal disputes between them.
