= Brasil Online =

Web portal

- Industry: Internet
- Founded: 1996
- Headquarters: Brazil
- Products: Site
- Operating income: Brasil Online
- Website: www.bol.com.br

Brasil Online (BOL) is an Internet portal that provides email hosting and free email services UOL.

== History ==
In April 1996, BOL was launched in Brazil by Grupo Abril, one of the largest Communication Holdings in Brazil.

Grupo Abril and Grupo Folha, which owns UOL, signed a joint-venture that September. UOL acquired BOL and created the largest Brazilian Internet provider in numbers of subscribers and amount of content in Portuguese. Features such as news, photos, videos, chat rooms and entertainment are offered by the portal. It has million users every month.

In October 1999, BOL was re-branded as the first free email provider in Brazil. BOL hosted more than million email accounts by the following August.

BOL launched a new email platform based in Ajax with Web 2.0 technology in 2008. The platform has search engines that go through each folder as well as provide automatic contact storage, create filters to organize messages, including smart visualization of attached files and creating contact groups.

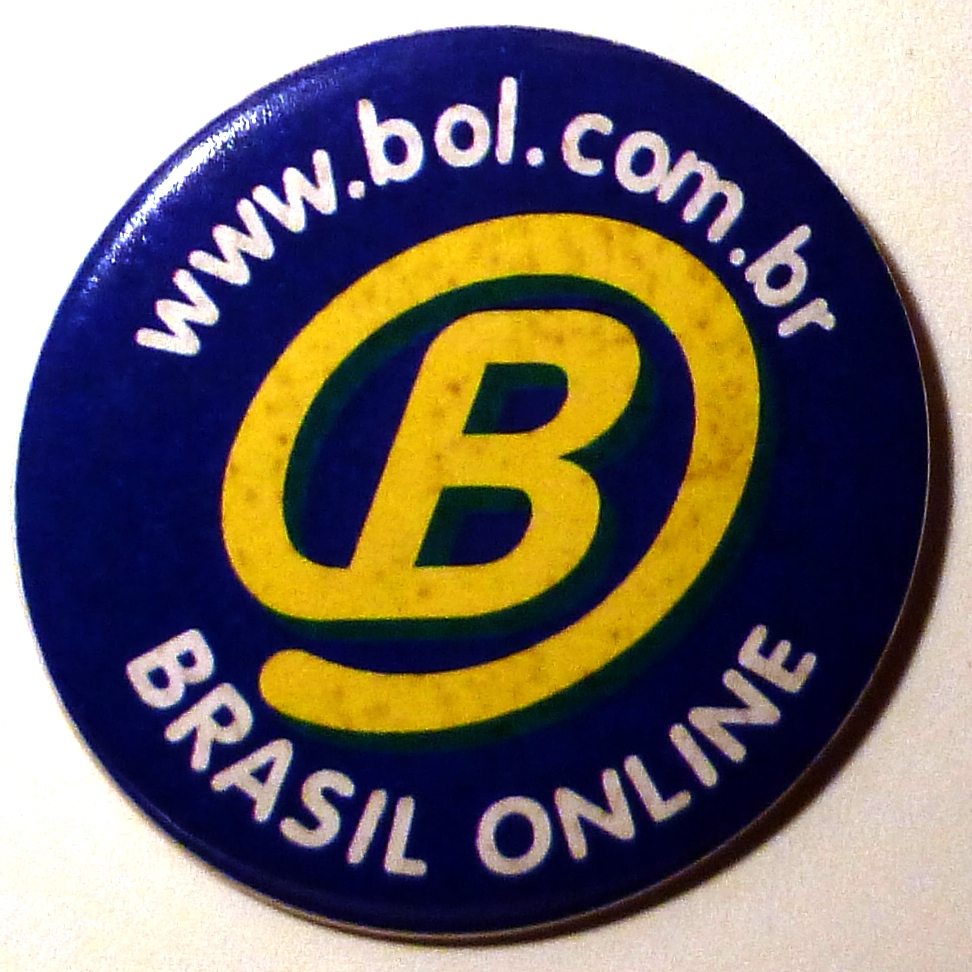
Brasil Online promotional button, created in 1996 with logo designed by typographer and designer Tony de Marco

In 2011, BOL partnered with sports journalist Milton Neves. With the partnership, Neves hosted his sports portal Terceiro Tempo and blog covering news, opinions and Brazilian and International football side stories on BOL.

In 2013, BOL partnered with Elancers to create a resume database on the BOL Empregos page. BOL Empregos is a free service that gathers more than 40,000 jobs for meeting from over 6,000 business for sale. A new version of the BOL mobile mail app for smartphones and tablets compatible with Android and iOS operating systems was released that year.

== Services ==
=== BOL Mail ===
BOL offers a free email service with a 6 GB capacity, spellchecker, customizable themes and interfaces for iPhone, iPad and Android. Since 2012, BOL uses the IMAP system for send and receive procedures to ensure that the original server's content is not erased.

=== BOL Notícias ===
The BOL Notícias platform has more than 100 million page views every month. The portal offers sports, entertainment and cooking content in real time. It also reproduces news from sources such as UOL, national and international news agencies.

=== BOL Chat ===
BOL's chat is free and accessible to the general public. BOL Chat offers more than 700 chat rooms, 9 themes and has approximately 70 million page views every month.

=== VilaBOL ===
VilaBOL was a free cloud data hosting service provided by BOL. VilaBOL offered 15 MB of storage, an e-mail account, a web designer tool, a poll designer and a hit counter for each user. The service was terminated in 2012.
