= Forehead kiss =

Social gesture

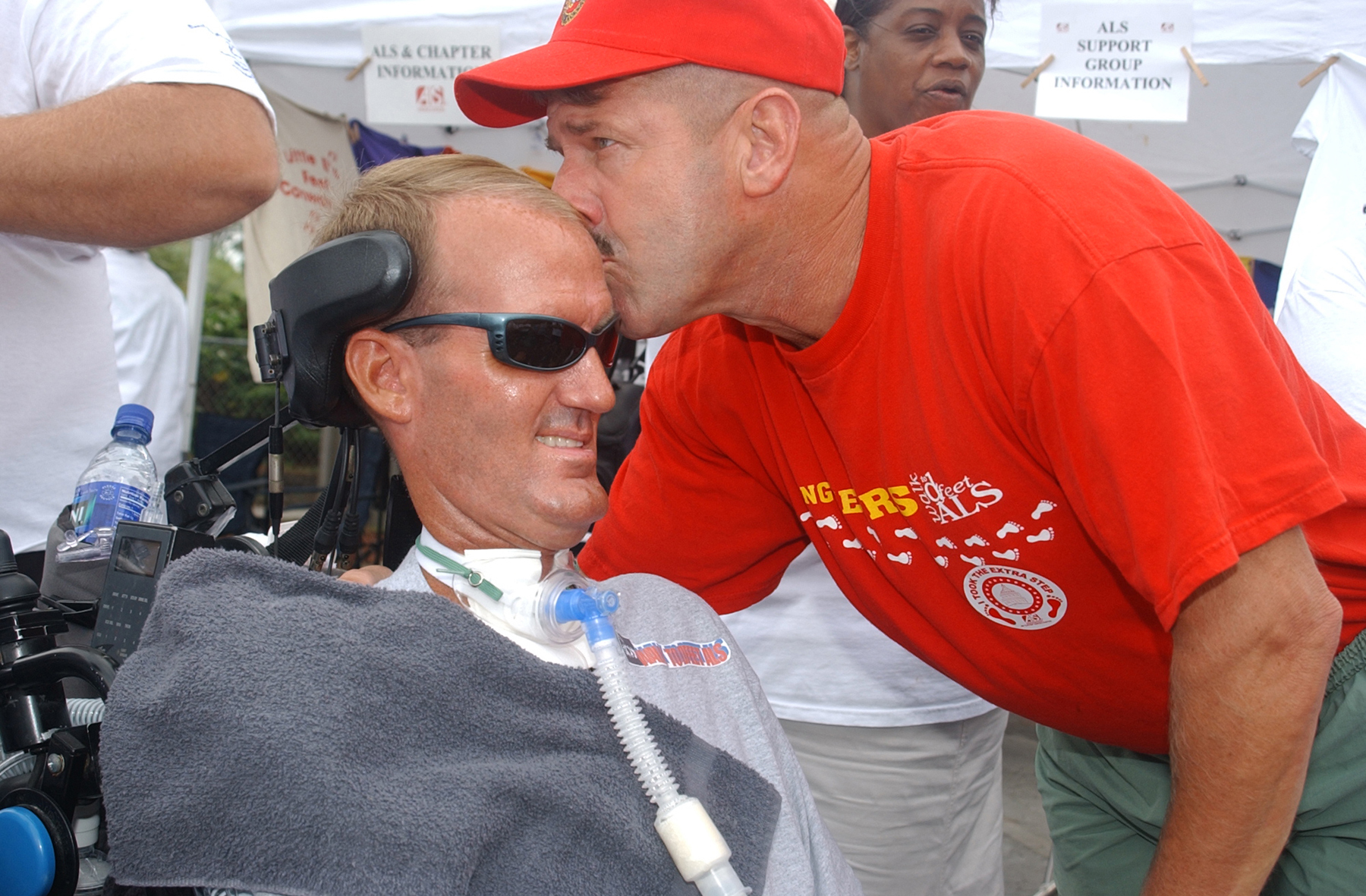
A forehead kiss

A forehead kiss is a social kissing gesture to indicate friendship and/or to denote comforting someone. A forehead kiss is a sign of adoration and affection. In some Arabic cultures, the forehead kiss is a gesture of apology as well as a sign of acknowledgment of grievance on the part of the person being kissed. In the Middle Eastern countries such as Iran, Egypt, Syria, Saudi Arabia and Jordan, a kiss on the forehead is usually a sign of respect to elders when they are getting kissed by the younger ones. Other regions where the forehead kiss has been noted is in Kurdish societies wherein it is usually the older person kissing the younger person on the forehead. Likewise, the forehead kiss is a more acceptable, and subtle, public display of affection. It allows for emotion and passion to be passed from one partner to another, without involving the eyes of those around them like other public displays of affection would.

However, it has been argued that the act of kissing a person's forehead is not romantic. Instead, such an act is purely neutral and should not be used when trying to transfer feelings of passion, lust or romantic love. It has been said to lack certain qualities that make other kisses more romantic and therefore should not be thought of as a gesture for expressing non-platonic love. It is even stated that the kiss is used as a means of imposing distance in certain situations.

== See also ==
- Public display of affection
- Salute
- Kiss
