= Joia Rara =

Brazilian telenovela

- Also known as: Precious Pearl
- Genre: Telenovela; Drama; Romance; Suspense
- Created by: Duca Rachid; Thelma Guedes
- Directed by: Amora Mautner
- Starring: Bruno Gagliasso; Bianca Bin; Carmo Dalla Vecchia; Mel Maia; José de Abreu; Carolina Dieckmann; Domingos Montagner; Nathália Dill see more
- Opening theme: Joia Rara by Gilberto Gil
- Country of origin: Brazil
- Original language: Portuguese
- No. of episodes: 173 (original version); 110 (international version)

Production
- Production locations: Brazil; Nepal
- Running time: 50 minutes

Original release
- Network: TV Globo
- Release: 16 September 2013 – 4 April 2014

Related
- Flor do Caribe; Meu Pedacinho de Chão

Joia Rara (Portuguese pronunciation: [ˈʒɔjjɐ ˈʁaɾɐ], English: officially Precious Pearl; literally Rare Jewel, figuratively Unique Grace) is a Brazilian telenovela produced and broadcast by TV Globo from 16 September 2013 to 4 April 2014.

Written by Duca Rachid and Thelma Guedes. Directed by Amora Mautner. Starring Bruno Gagliasso, Bianca Bin, Carmo Dalla Vecchia, Mel Maia, José de Abreu, Carolina Dieckmann, Domingos Montagner, Nathália Dill.

In 2014, the show won the International Emmy Award for Best Telenovela at the 42nd International Emmy Awards.

== Plot ==
In 1934, two supposed brothers survived an avalanche in the Himalayas: the millionaire Franz Hauser (Bruno Gagliasso), who is saved by Buddhist monks, and Manfred (Carmo Dalla Vecchia), rescued by a team of climbers. Manfred returns to Brazil with a terrible secret: he sabotaged Franz’s equipment in order to take his place in the family business. After an exhaustive search, Ernest Hauser gives his son up for dead and appoints his bastard son as the director of the Hauser Group.

In the monastery, Franz becomes close friends with the spiritual leader Ananda (Nelson Xavier) and before his return home, the monk promises him that they will meet again in the future. Franz's family is thrilled with his return but Manfred, with his plans thwarted, begins scheming again to eliminate Franz once and for all.

Through a twist of fate, Franz meets the worker Amélia (Bianca Bin), a former girlfriend of one of the climbers who went with Franz and Manfred on the expedition. The two fall in love and, despite family opposition and Manfred's schemes, they stay together and have a daughter, Perola (meaning "Pearl", a very common name in Brazil; played by Mel Maia). Framed in a plot, Amélia is sentenced to jail and so, the child ends up in the custody of her paternal family.

With the death of the monk Ananda, his disciples set out to look for the person who they believe is to be his reincarnation. All signs point to Perola, and upon receiving the news, she is eager to begin her studies at the monastery. It is she who will solve the issues that have been preventing her parents' union.

== Production ==
For the Himalayan scenes, the Precious Pearl crew spent 20 days in Nepal shooting in the cities of Kathmandu, Patan and Bhaktapur. They also shot in Bungamati, which is a 16th-century village, as well as at the Golden Temple, and at the Shechen Monastery. The production crew used around 60 local extras. Many objects were acquired in Nepal, particularly incense stick holders, bed linens, prayer objects and wooden bowls used by monks, were used for the telenovela set design, at Globo's studios in Rio de Janeiro (Projac).

The 1930s and 1940s were recreated at Globo's production center to allow audiences to dive into the atmosphere of Precious Pearl. Two scenic cities were created, adding up to a total of 8,000 square meters, in addition to approximately 60 studio scenarios. In the Lapa set, a cable car strolls through a 70-meter long rail, built exclusively for the telenovela.

== Cast ==
| Actor/Actress | Character |
|---|---|
| Bruno Gagliasso | Franz Hauser |
| Bianca Bin | Amélia Fonseca Hauser |
| José de Abreu | Ernest Hauser |
| Carolina Dieckmann | Iolanda López Fonseca |
| Domingos Montagner | Mundo (Raimundo Fonseca) |
| Mel Maia | Perola Fonseca Hauser |
| Carmo Dalla Vecchia | Manfred Ducke López |
| Nathalia Dill | Silvia Zampari Hauser |
| Rafael Cardoso | Viktor Hauser |
| Luiza Valdetaro | Hilda Hauser Baldo |
| Thiago Lacerda | Toni (Antônio Baldo) |
| Ana Cecília Costa | Gaia Petra |
| Nelson Xavier | Ananda Rinpoche |
| Caio Blat | Sonan Gyatso |
| Ângelo Antônio | Tenpa Ningpo |
| Ana Lúcia Torre | Frau Gertrude |
| Reginaldo Faria | Venceslau López |
| Letícia Spiller | Lola Gardel |
| Ricardo Pereira | Fabrício |
| Mariana Ximenes | Aurora Lincoln Hérnandez |
| Leandro Lima | Davi Hérnandez |
| Miguel Rômulo | Décio Passos |
| Leopoldo Pacheco | Valter Passos |
| Claudia Ohana | Laura Passos |
| Xande Valois | Otávio Passos (Tavinho) / Giuseppe Baldo |
| Tania Khalill | Dália Hérnandez |
| Marcelo Médici | Joel |
| Marcos Caruso | Arlindo Pacheco Leão |
| Rosi Campos | Miquelina Pacheco Leão |
| Nicette Bruno | Santinha |
| Luiz Gustavo | Apolônio Fonseca |
| Tiago Abravanel | Odilon Mascarenhas |
| Fabiula Nascimento | Matilde Meyer Gyatso |
| Simone Gutierrez | Serena Fox Pacheco Leão |
| Paula Burlamaqui | Volpina Soytena López |
| Luana Martau | Creotina (Cléo) |
| Cacau Protásio | Lindinha |
| Juliana Lohmann | Belmira Pacheco Leão Mascarenhas |
| Pedro Neschling | Arlindo Pacheco Leão Filho (Arlindinho) |
| Norma Blum | Mama Francesca (Francesca Baldo) |
| Cristiane Amorim | Josefine Fonseca (Zefinha) |
| Cláudia Missura | Dona Conceição |
| Anthero Montenegro | Benito Duarte |
| Sílvia Salgado | Pilar Duarte |
| Giovanna Ewbank | Cristina |
| Aninha Lima | Zilda |
| Ícaro Silva | Artur |
| Guta Ruiz | Elisa |
| Jorge Maya | Cícero |
| Adriano Bolshi | Rigpa |
| Marcos Damigo | Dr. Rubens |
| Fábio Yoshihara | Jampa Yonten |
| Karine Carvalho | Rosa |
| Land Vieira | Isaías |
| Maria Gal | Margarida |
| Adélio Lima | Josias |
| Michel Gomes | Curió |
| Glicério do Rosário | Etelvino |
| Renato Góes | Nuno |
| Adriano Alves | Norbu |
| João Fernandes | Irineu Hauser Baldo (Peteleco) |
| Bia Guedes | Julieta |
| Alexandre Rodrigues | Josué |
| Joelson Gusson | Laerte |
| Glória Menezes | Pérola Fonseca Hauser (as an old lady) |
| Sacha Bali | Eurico Passos |
| Suely Franco | Maria do Rosário Pacheco Leão (Rosarinho) |
| Rhaisa Batista | Teresa |
| Vicentini Gomez | Delegado Cavalcante |
| Armando Babaioff | Aderbal Feitosa |
| Mouhamed Harfouch | Alessandro Marson |
| Stella Maria Rodrigues | Marlene |
| Max Lima | Caetano |
| Dja Martins | Bibiana |
| José Araújo | Eufrásio |
| Nicola Lamas | Bauducco |
| Nicole Gomes | Pérola Fonseca Hauser (20 years) |
| João Vithor Oliveira | Ernest Hauser (young) |
| Daniel Blanco | Irmão de Gertrude |
| Élcio Romar | Salvador Soares da Costa |
| Juliana Araújo | Marta da Costa |
| Paulo Verlings | Kléber |
| Rita Porto | Idalina |
| Mariana Mac Niven | Catarina Hauser |
| Isio Ghelman | Heitor Zampari |
| Kaik Brum | Sonan Gyatso (child) |
| Marcelo Aquino | Peçanha |
| Mabel Cezar | Elvira |
| Vilma Melo | Fátima |
| Gillray Coutinho | Batista |
| Márcio Ehrlich | Dr. Moacir |
| Gustavo Trestini | Dr. Silveira |

== Ratings ==
In Brazil, the telenovela had average ratings of 21 points and 46% share, reaching over 26 million viewers per day. The telenovela's official hashtag, #joiarara, was mentioned 80,000 times, which corresponds to 58% of the total volume of simultaneous online comments. Aired in Portugal, in the Globo basic channel, the plot is daily ranked among the 5 most watched paid TV shows in the country.

| Timeslot | No. of episodes | Premiered | | Ended | | Position | Season | Average rating |
| Timeslot | No. of episodes | Date | Premiere Ratings | Date | Finale Ratings | Position | Season | Average rating |
|---|---|---|---|---|---|---|---|---|
| Monday—Saturday; 18:20 (BRT) | 173 | 16 September 2013 | 21 | 4 April 2014 | 23 | #1 | 2014 – 2015 | 18 |

== Awards and nominations ==
| Year | Award | Category | Recipient | Result |
|---|---|---|---|---|
| 2013 | Melhores do Ano NaTelinha | Best Actress | Mel Maia | Nominated |
| 2013 | Melhores do Ano NaTelinha | Best Telenovela | Duca Rachid and Thelma Guedes | Nominated |
| 2013 | Retrospectiva UOL | Actress Revelation | Mel Maia | Nominated |
| 2013 | Retrospectiva UOL | Best Telenovela | Duca Rachid and Thelma Guedes | Nominated |
| 2013 | Retrospectiva UOL | Best Actor | Bruno Gagliasso | Nominated |
| 2013 | Retrospectiva UOL | Best Actor | José de Abreu | Nominated |
| 2013 | Retrospectiva UOL | Best Villain | José de Abreu | Nominated |
| 2013 | Retrospectiva UOL | Best Romantic Couple | Domingos Montagner and Carolina Dieckmann | Nominated |
| 2013 | Retrospectiva UOL | Best Romantic Couple | Bruno Gagliasso and Bianca Bin | Nominated |
| 2013 | Prêmio Noveleiros | Revelation | Leandro Lima | Nominated |
| 2013 | Prêmio Noveleiros | Best Mirim Actor | Mel Maia | Nominated |
| 2013 | Prêmio Noveleiros | Revenge/Flame of the Year | Nathalia Dill | Nominated |
| 2013 | Prêmio Noveleiros | Mush of the Year | Bruno Gagliasso | Nominated |
| 2013 | Prêmio Noveleiros | Best Couple Award | Bruno Gagliasso and Bianca Bin | Nominated |
| 2013 | Prêmio Noveleiros | Villain of the Year | José de Abreu | Nominated |
| 2013 | Prêmio Quem de Televisão | Melhor Ator | Domingos Montagner | Nominated |
| 2013 | Prêmio Quem de Televisão | Best Actress | Bianca Bin | Nominated |
| 2013 | Prêmio Quem de Televisão | Best Supporting Actor | Carmo Dalla Vecchia | Nominated |
| 2013 | Prêmio Quem de Televisão | Best Supporting Actor | José de Abreu | Nominated |
| 2013 | Prêmio Quem de Televisão | Best Supporting Actor | Tiago Abravanel | Nominated |
| 2013 | Prêmio Quem de Televisão | Best Author | Duca Rachid and Thelma Guedes | Nominated |
| 2013 | Melhores do Ano | Best Actor | Bruno Gagliasso | Nominated |
| 2013 | Melhores do Ano | Best Actor/Actress | Mel Maia | Nominated |
| 2014 | Troféu Internet | Melhor Novela | Duca Rachid and Thelma Guedes | Nominated |
| 2014 | Troféu Internet | Revelation | Tiago Abravanel | Nominated |
| 2014 | Prêmio Contigo! de TV | Telenovela of the Year | Duca Rachid and Thelma Guedes | Nominated |
| 2014 | Prêmio Contigo! de TV | Best Telenovela Actor | Bruno Gagliasso | Nominated |
| 2014 | Prêmio Contigo! de TV | Best Child Actress | Mel Maia | Won |
| 2014 | Prêmio Contigo! de TV | Best Telenovela Director | Amora Mautner and Ricardo Waddington | Nominated |
| 2014 | Prêmio Extra de Televisão | Best Telenovela | Duca Rachid and Thelma Guedes | Nominated |
| 2014 | Prêmio Extra de Televisão | Best Actor/Actress | Mel Maia | Won |
| 2014 | Prêmio Extra de Televisão | Best Costume Design | Joia Rara | Nominated |
| 2014 | Prêmio Extra de Televisão | Best Makeup | Joia Rara | Nominated |
| 2014 | Emmy Internacional | Best Telenovela | Duca Rachid and Thelma Guedes | Won |
