= Mel Maia =

Brazilian actress

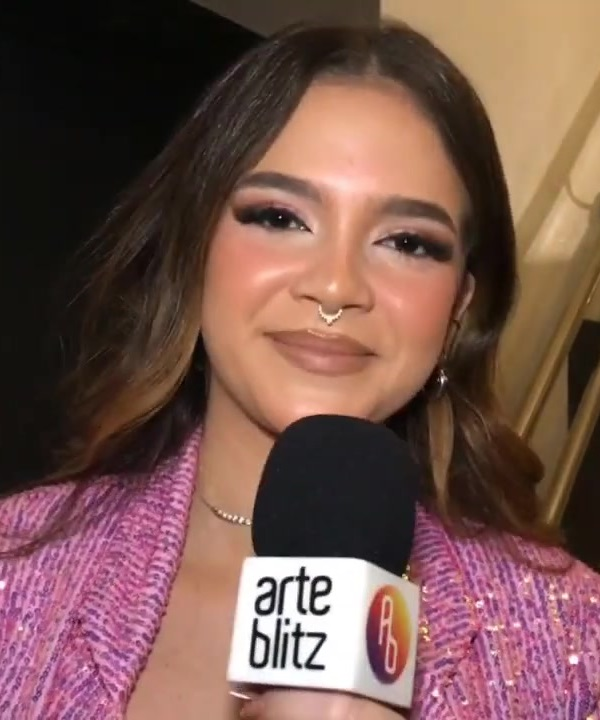
- Mel Maia in 2023
- Born: Melissa Maia de Sousa; May 3, 2004 (age 22); Rio de Janeiro, Brazil
- Occupation: Actress
- Years active: 2011–present

Melissa "Mel" Maia de Sousa (Brazilian Portuguese: [ˈmɛw ˈmajɐ]; born May 3, 2004) is a Brazilian actress.

== Biography ==
She was born on May 3, 2004 in Rio de Janeiro. She rose to fame in 2012 when she played young Rita in the telenovela Avenida Brasil. She received multiple awards for the said role.

== Filmography ==
Television
| Year | Title | Role | Notes |
|---|---|---|---|
| 2011 | O Relógio da Aventura | Nina | Supporting role |
| 2012 | Avenida Brasil | Rita Fonseca de Souza (child) | Episodes: "March 26–April 16" |
| 2013 | Joia Rara | Pérola Fonseca Hauser | Main role |
| 2015 | Além do Tempo | Felícia Cristina Pasqualino | |
| 2016 | Liberdade, Liberdade | Joaquina da Silva Xavier | Episodes: "April 11–14" |
| 2018 | Deus Salve o Rei | Agnes | |
| 2019 | A Dona do Pedaço | Cássia Mantovani Aguiar | |
| 2023 | Vai na Fé | Guilhermina "Guiga" de Alcântara Azevedo | |

== Awards and nominations ==
| Year | Award | Category | Nominated work | Result |
|---|---|---|---|---|
| 2012 | Prêmio Extra de Televisão | Child Revelation | Avenida Brasil | Won |
| 2013 | Prêmio Contigo! | Best Child Actress | Avenida Brasil | Won |
| 2013 | Troféu Imprensa | Revelation | Avenida Brasil | Nominated |
| 2013 | Prêmio Quem | Revelation | Avenida Brasil | Nominated |
| 2013 | Melhores do Ano | Best Child Actor or Actress | Avenida Brasil | Won |
