= Mansão Bem Assombrada =

- Distributed by: SBT
- Release date: December 29, 2015
- Country: Brazil

Mansão Bem Assombrada is a 2015 holiday special broadcast by SBT, featuring a cast that includes Pedro Lemos, Lisandra Cortez, Danilo Gentili, Marlei Cevada, Nicholas Torres, Pedro Henrique, Graciely Junqueira, Jean Paulo Campos, and Duda Matte in the lead roles.

== Plot ==
The special tells the story of Zepa (Pedro Lemos), an art teacher, and Giovanna (Lisandra Cortez), who lead a school theater group called "Trupe dos Seis" (Troupe of the Six), made up of students Tecão (Nicholas Torres), Gabi, Bruno (Pedro Henrique), Tati (Graciely Junqueira), Dudu (Jean Paulo Campos), and Michele (Duda Matte). The group is set to perform at the school's end-of-year party, but with no rehearsal space available, the teacher decides to hold rehearsals at the old mansion belonging to his grandfather, Barão Alfredo (Arthur Kohl). What he doesn't know is that the place has two unusual inhabitants: a ghostly couple who can now go back to scaring and playing pranks on people.

== Cast ==
Actors	Characters
Pedro Lemos	Zepa
Lisandra Cortez	Giovanna
Danilo Gentili	Bugabu
Marlei Cevada	Mumuca
Jean Paulo Campos	Dudu
Duda Matte	Michele
Arthur Kohl	Barão Alfredo

== Announcement ==
The special was announced on December 15, 2015, following the conclusion of the show Chiquititas, and aired on December 29, immediately after Programa do Ratinho.
