= Como se Tornar o Pior Aluno da Escola =

2017 film directed by Fabrício Bittar

- Theatrical release poster
- Directed by: Fabrício Bittar
- Written by: Danilo Gentili; André Catarinacho
- Based on: Como se Tornar o Pior Aluno da Escola by Danilo Gentilli
- Starring: Bruno Munhoz; Daniel Pimentel; Carlos Villagrán; Danilo Gentili; Joana Fomm; Moacyr Franco; Fábio Porchat
- Cinematography: Eduardo Makino
- Edited by: Bruno Nunes
- Music by: Teco Fuchs
- Production companies: Clube Filmes; Paris Filmes; Telecine; Warner Bros.
- Distributed by: Downton Filmes
- Release date: October 12, 2017
- Running time: 106 minutes
- Country: Brazil
- Language: Portuguese

Como se Tornar o Pior Aluno da Escola (English: How to Become the Worst Student in School) is a 2017 Brazilian comedy film based on the eponymous book by comedian Danilo Gentili. The film was directed by Fabrício Bittar and the screenplay was written by Gentili with collaborations from various other writers.

The film received mostly negative reviews following its release, but the performance of the young cast was praised.

== Synopsis ==
Bernadinho (Bruno Munhoz) and Pedro (Daniel Pimentel) are high school students and face the burden of doing well at school and behaving, while the principal Ademar (Carlos Villagrán) enacts increasingly complex and specific rules. Frustrated, Pedro comes upon a handmade book with advice on how to cause chaos in school without being caught.

== Cast ==
- Danilo Gentili as Worst Student
- Bruno Munhoz as Bernardo
- Daniel Pimentel as Pedro
- Carlos Villagrán as Principal Ademar
- Joana Fomm as Math teacher
- Moacyr Franco as Janitor
- Fábio Porchat as Cristiano
- Raul Gazolla as Physical education teacher
- Rogério Skylab as History teacher
- Marcelo Rafael as Security officer

== Controversy ==
While promoting the film, Gentili used his social networks to incite attacks on the authors of negative reviews. An example was the CinePOP website, which accused the director of initiating a wave of virtual attacks.

In another case, a producer criticized Folha de S.Paulo journalist Diego Bargas, of Folha de S. Paulo, for conducting an allegedly interview with him. On Facebook, Gentili published the interview paired with images of Bargas' posts praising former Presidents of Brazil Luiz Inácio Lula da Silva and Dilma Rousseff and former mayor of São Paulo Fernando Haddad. As a result, Bargas was attacked on social media and fired by Folha for his political comments. Folha justified its decision by stating that Diego had "disrespected repeated guidance on behavior in social networks." According to the newspaper, "journalists are told to avoid expressing political-party positions and not to issue social media comments that compromise the independence of their reports".

Gentili's behavior and his followers', as well as the newspaper's decision to fire the reporter, were widely panned by class entities. In a joint statement, the Union of Professional Journalists of the State of São Paulo and the National Federation of Journalists "vehemently repudiate[d] the attacks on the journalist and his dismissal," which they considered acts which jeopardized the principles of freedom of the press and of expression.
