= The Dognapper (2013 film) =

2013 film directed by Pedro Amorim

- Theatrical release poster
- Directed by: Pedro Amorim
- Written by: André Pereira
- Produced by: Malu Miranda; Eliane Ferreira
- Starring: Bruno Gagliasso; Leandra Leal; Danilo Gentili
- Cinematography: Gustavo Hadba
- Production companies: Mixer; Lupa Filmes
- Distributed by: Imagem Filmes
- Release date: 4 October 2013
- Running time: 122 minutes
- Country: Brazil
- Language: Portuguese
- Budget: R$6 million
- Box office: R$11,586,523

The Dognapper (Portuguese: Mato sem Cachorro) is a 2013 Brazilian comedy film directed by Pedro Amorim, his directorial debut, and starring Bruno Gagliasso, Leandra Leal and Danilo Gentili.

The film was released in Brazil on October 4, 2013, the National Dog Day and World Animal Day.

== Plot ==
Deco (Bruno Gagliasso) and Zoé (Leandra Leal) fall in love after saving a puppy with narcolepsy. The relationship ends two years later and Zoe takes the couple's dog with her. For the first time, Deco has to take a stand, and retrieve his dog.

== Cast ==
- Bruno Gagliasso as Deco
- Leandra Leal as Zoé
- Danilo Gentili as Leléo
- Letícia Isnard as Ananda
- Enrique Diaz as Fernando
- Felipe Rocha as Sidney
- Gabriela Duarte as Mariana
- Simone Mazzer as Rita
- Rafinha Bastos as Vet

== Music ==
- No Surprises - Radiohead
- I Love Rock 'n' Roll - Joan Jett & The Blackhearts
- We Will Rock You - Queen
- Meu Sangue Ferve Por Você - Sidney Magal
- Alagados - Os Paralamas do Sucesso
- The Underdog - Spoon
- Us Mano E As Mina - Xis
- Fogo e Paixão - Wando
- Kátia Flávia - Fausto Fawcett
- Eu Não Sou Cachorro Não - Waldick Soriano
