= Danilo Gentili =

Brazilian comedian and TV host

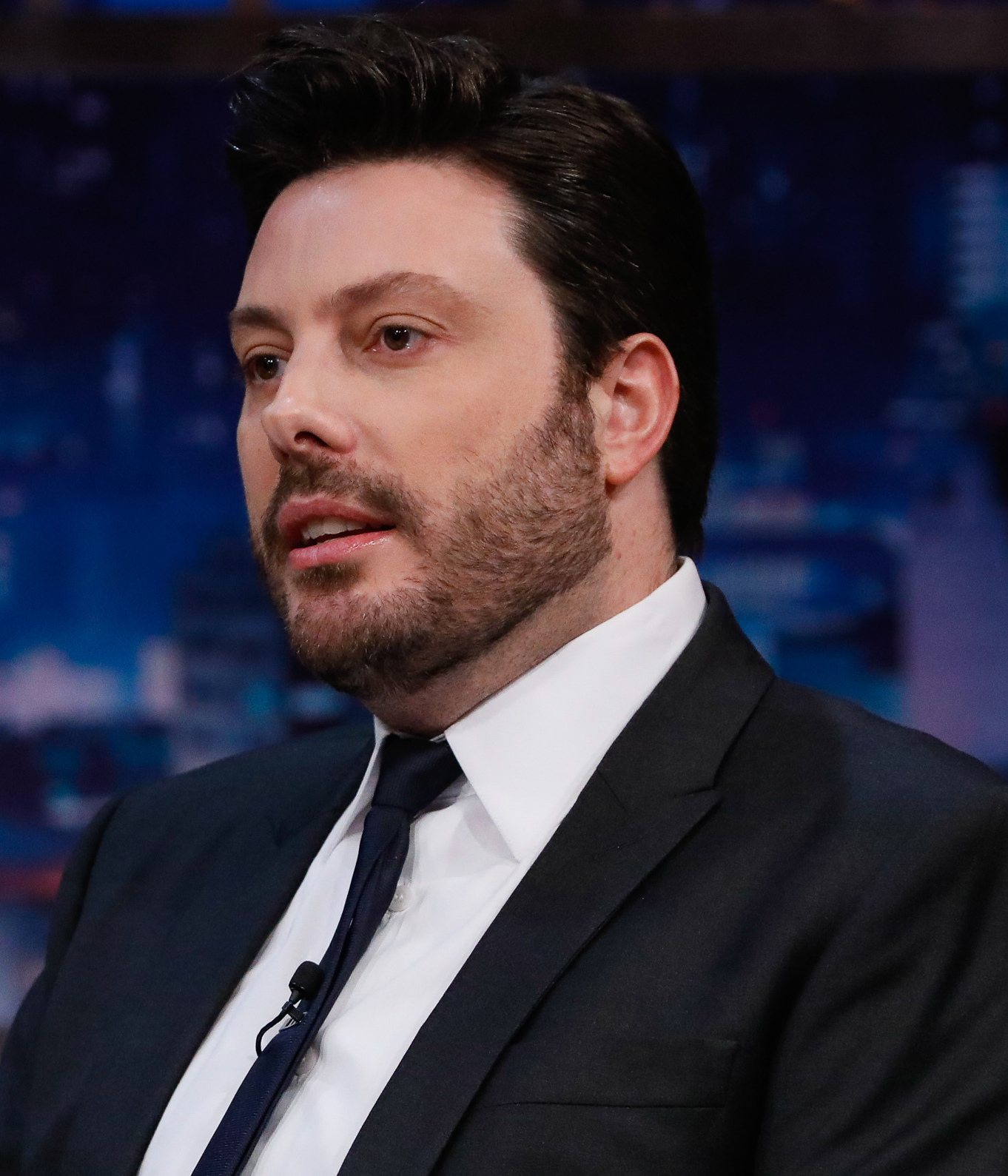
- Gentili in May 2019
- Born: Danilo Gentili Júnior; 27 September 1979 (age 47); Santo André, São Paulo, Brazil
- Education: Universidade do Grande ABC
- Occupations: Television host, comedian, writer, actor, reporter, cartoonist, advertiser, businessman
- Years active: 2005–present
- Known for: Stand-up, television, film, books
- Television: Custe o Que Custar; Agora É Tarde; The Noite com Danilo Gentili
- Political party: Novo (2021-2025) Missão (2026-)

Danilo Gentili Júnior (born 27 September 1979) is a Brazilian comedian, television host, writer, cartoonist, and businessman.

He gained national recognition on the TV show Custe o Que Custar (CQC), aired on the Band network. Gentili then created and hosted Agora É Tarde (2011–2013), a late-night talk show on the same network, later moving to the SBT network with talk show The Noite com Danilo Gentili (2014–present). Gentili is also a partner in two stand-up comedy clubs, has written four books, and has acted in, written and produced films.

== Early and personal life ==
Gentili was born in Santo André, the youngest son of a housewife and a typewriter technician. He is of Italian descent. His paternal grandfather, Ulderico Gentili, was a church painter who left Italy for São Paulo, Brazil, during World War II. He was raised in the tenements of Parque das Nações neighborhood near Santo André, and later moved to São Paulo. When he was 18, his father died of a heart attack. Six months later his older sibling, Karina Gentili, died in a car accident.

In 2003, Gentili graduated from the Grande ABC University (UniABC) with a degree in social communication (advertising).

Gentili has been diagnosed with autism.

== Career ==
=== Early career ===
In 2006, Gentili joined Clube da Comédia Stand-Up, a stand-up comedy group which performed at local and national festivals. He started a comedy show called Comédia ao Vivo. Gentili also made small television appearances, mostly on MTV Brasil.

Gentili also worked at a cartoonist and caricaturist. In 2008, he collaborated with the Brazilian edition of Mad magazine. During 2008–2009, he wrote a column for Metro Jornal, a popular newspaper in Brazil, and was recognized as "Paulistano of the Year" by Veja magazine.

=== 2008–2010: CQC, Comedians and Politicamente Incorreto ===
In 2008, Gentili appeared on the series Custe o Que Custar (CQC, lit. Whatever it Takes), broadcast by Rede Bandeirantes. Gentili initially performed in a segment called the "Reporter Inexperiente" (English: Inexperienced Reporter) where he asked his guests awkward and unexpected questions with often bizarre turns of events. The segment was an immediate hit and led to a broader take on the same theme where he began to interview people in public, especially about politics.

Gentili became notorious for confronting politicians with humorous but piercing questions which often exposed or embarrassed them, and became known as the terror dos políticos (English: terror of the politicians). His antics sometimes became newsworthy, such as when he was banned from the National Congress after questioning Senator Renan Calheiros about corruption charges. On other occasions, he was physically assaulted by a senator's bodyguard, and detained by police after exposing a public school's administration problems. His fans seemed to connect strongly with his humor, particularly as Brazilian politics continued to spiral into repeated scandals.

During the 2010–11 season of CQC, Gentili also featured in the segments "Proteste Já" (English: Protest Now) and "National Identity" as well as other comedic pieces commenting on national political events.

In late 2009, Panda Books published his first book, Como se Tornar o Pior Aluno da Escola (English: How to become the worst student in school). The satirical instruction manual soon received a warning label recommending it for those over the age of 18.

In August 2010, Gentili partnered with Rafinha Bastos and Ítalo Gusso to found Comedians Comedy Club, at Rua Augusta in São Paulo. It was among the first clubs in Brazil dedicated to stand-up comedy.

On the day before Brazil's 2010 presidential election, with a television ban on political humour, Gentili released Politicamente Incorreto (English: Politically Incorrect) on the Internet. This stand-up show was written and performed by Gentili, in which he spoke of every presidential candidate that year. It was streamed on Universo Online (UOL), Brazil's largest Internet portal, attracting 1.2 million viewers. The performance was later released on DVD and audiobook formats, and received worldwide attention including reviews by The New York Times and The Guardian. Gentili released a book of the same name in which he offered humorous criticism of the political times.

=== 2011: Agora É Tarde and Comedy Central Presents ===
Gentili developed a late-night talk show with CQC writer Alex Baldin; a TV pilot was made a condition of his 2009 contract for CQC, and was recorded in 2010. Agora É Tarde (English: It's too late) premiered in June 2011 on Rede Bandeirantes, with Gentili hosting. It cast Ultraje a Rigor as its supporting band and included comedy routines, stand-up and round-table discussions with other comedians in addition to bringing Brazilian celebrities as the main guests.

Despite doubts from the mainstream media, the show received excellent ratings for its time slot and was expanded from two to three nights per week. Newspaper O Globo named Agora É Tarde the best TV show of the year and Gentili the best TV show host. It was also chosen by the Brazilian Press Association as the 'Best Talk Show' in the 2012 edition of their awards.

In October 2011, Gentili hosted eight episodes of Comedy Central Apresenta, originally shown on VH1 Brasil to promote the launch of Comedy Central Brasil. Recorded at Comedians Comedy Club, the shows featured showcase performances by stand-up comedians.

Also in October, Gentili and Monster Juice released his first video game, O mundo vs Danilo Gentili (English: The World vs. Danilo Gentili). The game took first place in the mobile game category at the Brasil Game Show.

In November, he released the DVD Danilo Gentili: Volume 1, a 90-minute compilation of his stand-up performances.

After four seasons, Gentili left Custe o Que Custar to concentrate on his talk show.

=== 2012–2013: Launch of book and film ===
The second season of Agora É Tarde was simulcast on BandNews FM. The show expanded to a fourth weeknight as it reached its 100th episode.

In June 2012, Gentili's third book, A Vida e Outros Detalhes Insignificantes (English: Life and Other Insignificant Details), was published. It related his family's customs and details of old relationships mixed with ideas from his stand-up shows.

Gentili had his film acting debut in Mato sem Cachorro which premiered at the 2013 Rio de Janeiro Film Festival. According to critic Raphael Max, Gentili brought laughs to every scene shared with his co-star.

Financial difficulties at Rede Bandeirantes brought cuts to Agora É Tarde in December 2013 and a scale-back of comedy specials. Amid speculation of dissatisfaction by Gentili, he was bought out of his contract by Sistema Brasileiro de Televisão (SBT).

=== 2014–present: The Noite, Comedy Club and movies ===
With most of his team from Agora É Tarde, SBT launched Gentili's new late-night talk show, The Noite com Danilo Gentili (English: The Night with Danilo Gentili) on 10 March 2014. The program exceeded the broadcaster's expectations, doubling its audience in that time slot. Critics praised the show, which they said was on the same level as U.S. late shows.

Gentili also produced and hosted the 2014 series Politicamente Incorreto on FX Brasil.

In February 2015, Gentili opened another stand-up venue, The Comedy Club in Orlando, Florida. Comedian Diogo Portugal joined as a partner in the venture.

In August 2016, filming began on Como se Tornar o Pior Aluno da Escola, an adaptation of Gentili's first book with Gentili as creator, producer and screenwriter. It was released in April 2017 to mostly negative reviews.

== Works ==
=== Television ===
Year	Title	Role	Notes	Ref.
2008	Grammy Latino de 2008	Himself		
2008–2011	Custe o Que Custar	Himself (reporter)	4 seasons	
2008–2011	Custe o Que Custar	Himself (co-host)	1 episode	
2011	Comedy Central Apresenta	Himself (host)	8 episodes	
2011–2013	Agora É Tarde	Himself (host)	435 episodes, also creator; simulcast on BandNews FM from 2012	
2012	A Liga	Himself (reporter)	Episode "Viver do Prazer"	
2012	O Riso dos Outros	Himself	Documentary	
2012	Os Fatos Espetaculares de 2012	Himself (host)	Special	
2014	Politicamente Incorreto (telessérie)	Atílio Pereira	Lead role, producer	
2014	É Natal, Mallandro!	Himself	Special	
2014–present	The Noite com Danilo Gentili	Himself (host)	645 episodes also creator	
2015	Mansão Bem Assombrada	Bugabu	Special	
2016	Tempero Secreto	Doctor	4 episodes	
2016	Procurando Casseta & Planeta	Himself	Episode "Juntos Outra Vez"	
2016–present	Entubados	Himself	14 episodes	

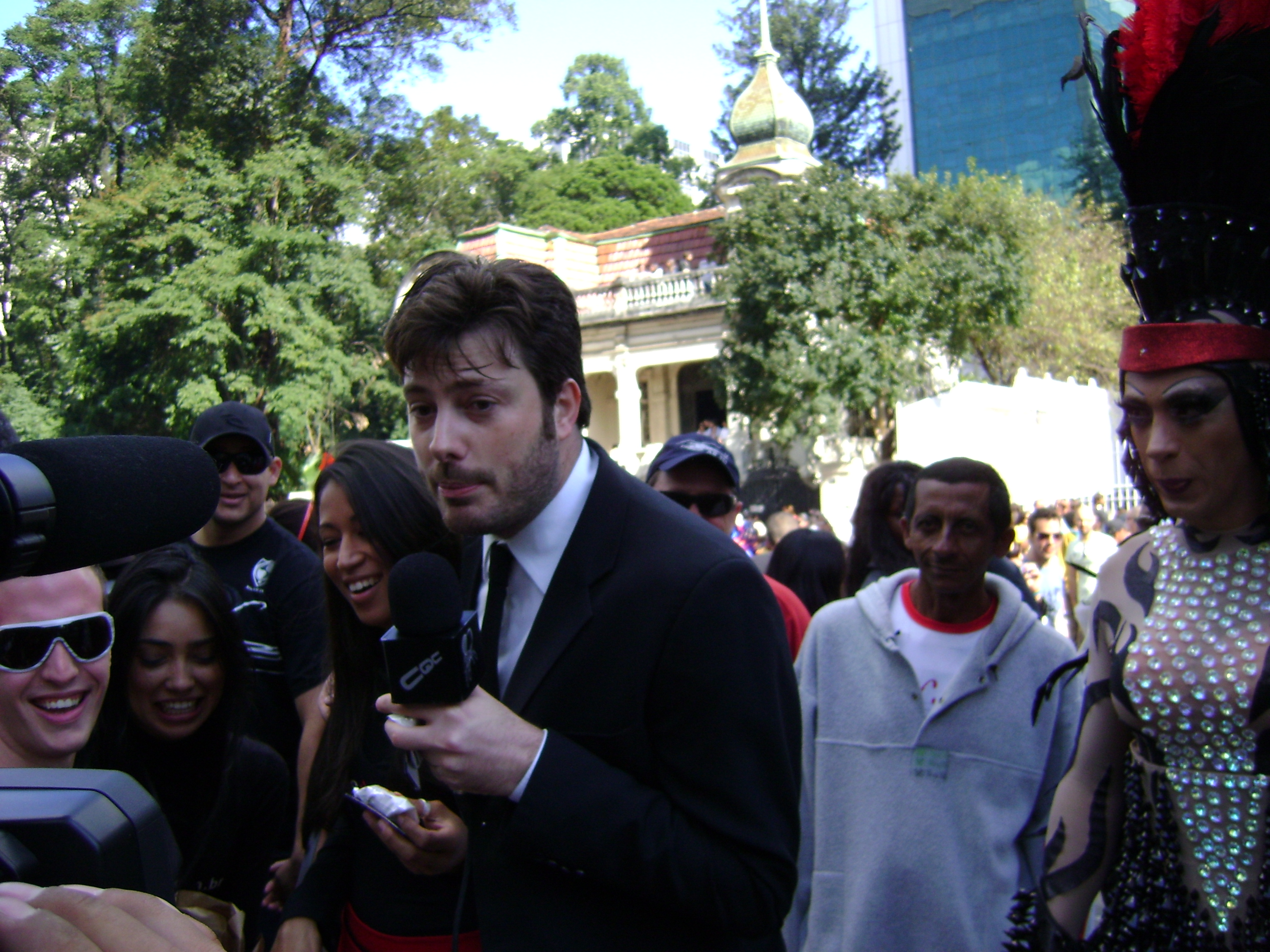
Gentili at São Paulo Gay Pride Parade, 2009

=== Film ===
Year	Title	Role	Notes
2013	Mato sem Cachorro	Leléo	Also developer
2014	As Aventuras de Paddington	Paddington (voice)	
2015	Superpai	Cop	
2017	BugiGangue no Espaço	Gustavinho (voice)	
2017	Como se Tornar o Pior Aluno da Escola	Danilo	Creator, producer and writer
2018	Os Exterminadores do Além Contra a Loira do Banheiro	Jack	Creator, producer and writer

=== Video games ===
Year	Title	Platform	Ref.
2011	O Mundo vs Danilo Gentili	iOS	
2016	Corre Danilo Corre!	iOS, Android	

=== Stand-up comedy ===
- 2005–2009 – Clube da Comédia Stand-Up – author and comedian
- 2006–2009 – Comédia ao Vivo – creator, comedian and author
- 2009 – Divina Comédia – creator, comedian and author (alongside other comedians)
- 2011 – Danilo Gentili Volume 1 (solo stand-up show) – comedian and author – released on DVD
- 2010 – Politicamente Incorreto (solo stand-up show) – comedian and author – released on DVD
- 2011 – Festival Risadaria (São Paulo, SP)
- 2011 – Virada Cultural de São Paulo
- 2012 – Festival Risadaria (São Paulo, SP)
- 2012 – Virada Cultural de São Paulo
- 2012 – Festival Risológio (Curitiba, SC) – 2012 Honoree

=== Music ===
- 2011 – "Ela Traiu o Rock&Roll" – lyrics and melody – recorded by the band Pedra Letícia

=== Publications and periodicals ===
- 2009, 2012 – Mad – writer and cartoonist
- 2009 – Como se Tornar o Pior Aluno da Escola (How to Become School's Worst Student) – Panda Books Publishing Company – author and illustrator
- 2010 – Politicamente Incorreto (Politically Incorrect) – Panda Books Publishing Company – author and illustrator
- 2012 – A Vida e Outros Detalhes Insignificantes (Life and other insignificant details) – Panda Books Publishing Company – author and illustrator

== Controversies ==
=== Aggression and arrest cases by CQC ===
In April 2008 when he visited the National Congress for the first time, Gentili was expelled for interviewing the president of the Chamber of Deputies, Arlindo Chinaglia, about the tax reform and the usage of tax money by deputies. The report was aired on 24 April.

He was arrested on 28 October 2009, at Assis, São Paulo, when he recorded a report about the town's zero-tolerance policy against vagrancy while dressed as a homeless man. Danilo was handcuffed and charged with disobedience, public disorder, and contempt.

On 25 July 2009, when trying to interview the president of Brazil's Federal Senate, José Sarney, Gentili was grabbed by one of the president's bodyguards and tossed to the ground. The assault was documented by a photographer from newspaper O Estado de S. Paulo and received national coverage.

In the episode of CQC broadcast on 28 June 2010, Gentili appeared to be assaulted by security guards in São Bernardo do Campo, while recording Proteste Já! about a collapsing school.

=== +18 censorship ===
Gentili's 2009 book Como se Tornar o Pior Aluno da Escola (English: How to become the worst student in school) was criticized for being potentially harmful to students. After receiving a warning from the Ministério Público, publisher Panda Books added a warning seal that it was not suitable for people under 18 years old. This brought more attention to the book and in September 2012 Clube Filmes had reached a deal to make a movie based on it.

=== Offense to a milk donor ===
By the end of October 2013, Gentili and Marcelo Mansfield were charged with injury by Michele Rafaela Maximino, a nurse and human milk donor, due to a joke made by them on Agora É Tarde broadcast on 3 October. The donor had been entered into the Guinness World Records by donating 300 litres (66 imp gal; 79 US gal) of milk and she alleged the joke had caused her to be bullied in her home town, which caused her to stop donating milk. The justice of Pernambuco ruled that Rede Bandeirantes pay damages of R$5,000 for every day the joke remained on their website.

=== Bandeirantes lawsuit ===
Rede Bandeirantes filed a lawsuit to stop The Noite from airing at SBT. According to the broadcaster, Gentili had been contracted until 2015. The judge did not accept this, nor claims that the new show was plagiarized. In August 2015, Gentili was ordered to pay R$2 million for breach of agreement, the judge noting damages such as the loss of advertisers. Gentili appealed the ruling.

=== Workers' Party blacklist ===
In June 2014, Alberto Cantalice, vice president of Partido dos Trabalhadores, put Gentili on a blacklist called "A desmoralização dos pitbulls da grande mídia" (English: Demoralizing the mainstream media pitbulls) published on the Workers' Party's official website. The list also included Marcelo Madureira, Lobão, Arnaldo Jabor, Reinaldo Azevedo, Diogo Mainardi, Guilherme Fiuza and Demétrio Magnoli, accusing them of elitism, being against the poor and for hate speech.

Marcelo Madureira reacted on YouTube, saying that he is not against the poor but he is against the Worker's Party. Reinaldo Azevedo publicized an article in his blog at Veja magazine that he would sue those responsible and that it was a policy issue. Gentili reacted on Facebook, including Madureira and Reinaldo's comments on the subject. Reporters Without Borders condemned the party for the creation of the list.

=== Lula Institute lawsuit ===
On 31 July 2015, Gentili posted a joke in his Twitter after the media announced an attack at Instituto Lula. The institution promised to seek justice. However, the judge rejected the lawsuit, noting that it was an "obvious joke" from the well-known comedian, and criticized the "unparalleled patrol of thought in Brazil."

=== Incitement of attacks on film critics ===
While promoting his 2017 film Como se Tornar o Pior Aluno da Escola, Gentili allegedly incited attacks on the authors of negative reviews through his social networks. The CinePOP website accused the director of initiating a wave of virtual attacks.
