= Bruno Gagliasso =

Brazilian actor (born 1982)

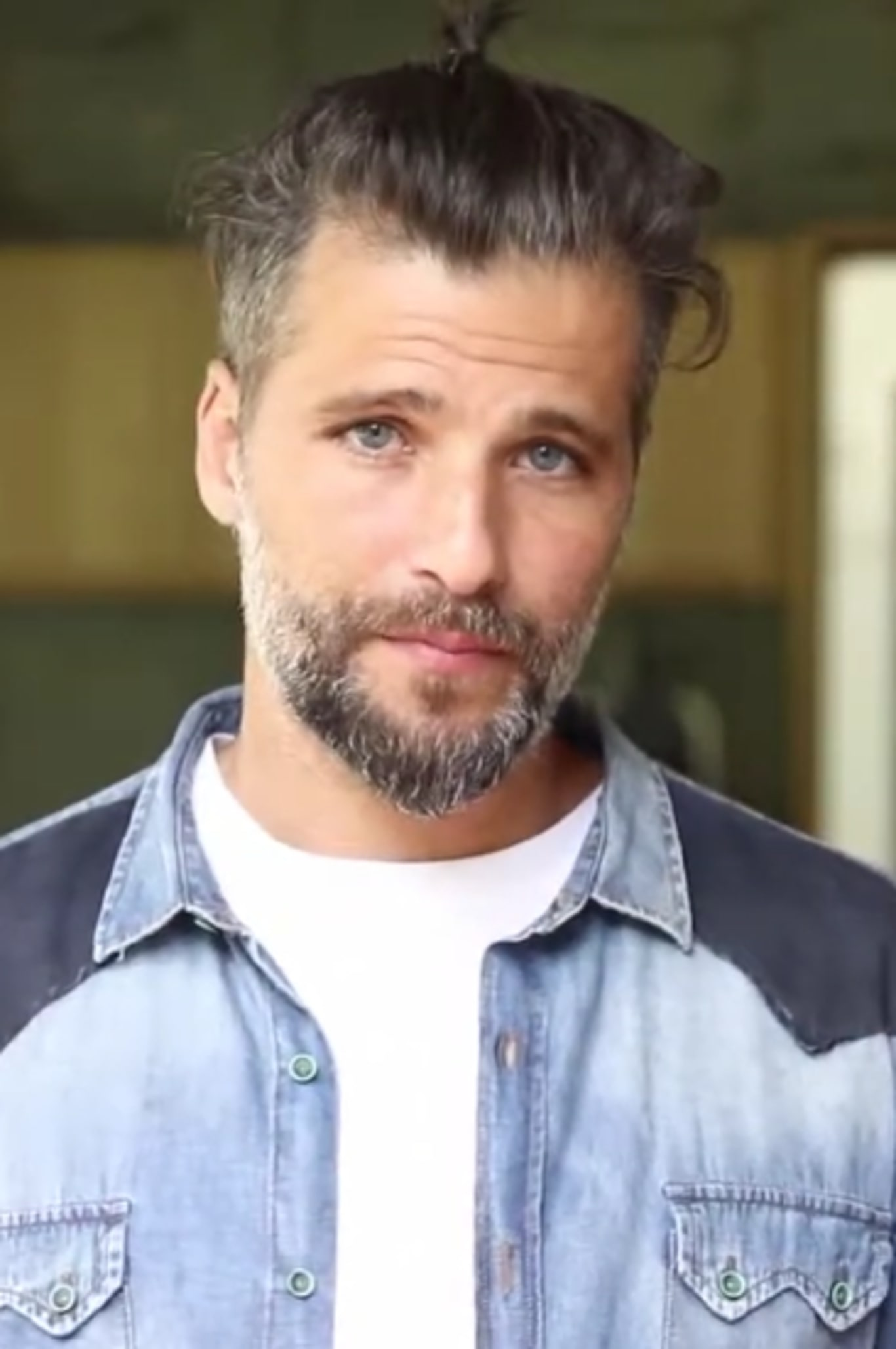
- Gagliasso in 2020
- Born: Bruno Gagliasso Marques; 13 April 1982 (age 44); Rio de Janeiro, Brazil
- Citizenship: Brazil; Portugal
- Occupation: Actor
- Years active: 1990–present
- Height: 1.69 m (5 ft 7 in)
- Spouses: Camila Rodrigues (m. 2006; div. 2008) Giovanna Ewbank (m. 2010)
- Children: 3
- Parents: Lúcia Gagliasso (mother); Paulo César Marques (father)
- Relatives: Thiago Gagliasso (younger brother); Paula Marques (younger sister)
- Website: www.brunogagliasso.com.br

Bruno Gagliasso Marques (born April 13, 1982) is a Brazilian actor. In 2020, he won the Best Actor award at the Los Angeles Brazilian Film Festival for his role in the film Loop.

== Career ==
Gagliasso's mother is of Italian descent, and his father has Portuguese ancestry. He began his career as a child, appearing in Rede Globo soap operas. In 1999, he participated in the episode "Papai é Gay!" on the program Você Decide. The following year, 2000, he made a cameo on the show Malhação, whose protagonists were played by Ludmila Dayer and Fábio Azevedo. Then he moved to the SBT, where he landed his first substantial role on the telenovela Chiquititas.

In 2001, he signed with Globo, the TV network which he remains under contract to as of the present, to join the cast of the telenovela As Filhas da Mãe, as Artur, the son of Rosalva (Regina Casé).

In 2007, he played his first telenovela villain, the seductive bastard Ivan on Paraíso Tropical. In contrast to 2008, he played the romantic hero Eduardo of Ciranda de Pedra. In 2009, he reappeared in the video as the schizophrenic Tarso in Caminho das Índias.

In 2010, he played the role of Italian bigamist Berillo Rondelli in the telenovela Passione. In 2011, he played the wicked Colonel Timóteo Cabral, the main antagonist of the telenovela Cordel Encantado.

In 2013, he starred in the movie The Dognapper alongside Leandra Leal and in the telenovela Joia Rara along with Bianca Bin.

In 2014, the actor turned down offers to act in two upcoming soap operas and chose to make the TV series Dupla Identidade, on which he played the main role as a serial killer.

== Filmography ==
Television
Year	Title	Role	Notes
1990	Barriga de Aluguel	son of Dr. Barroso	Cameo
1999	Você Decide	Renato	episode: "Papai é Gay"
1999	Mulher	Léo	episode: "Mãe Menina"
2000	Chiquititas	Rodrigo Bragança D'Ávila	
2001	As Filhas da Mãe	José Carlos Rocha	
2002	Desejos de Mulher	Saulo de Gog	Cameo
2002	Sítio do Picapau Amarelo	Romildo / Romeu	Episode: "Histórias Diversas"
2003	A Casa das Sete Mulheres	Caetano Gonçalves da Silva	
2003	Celebridade	Inácio Vasconcelos Amorim	
2005	América	Roberto Sinval Fontes Júnior	
2006	Sinhá Moça	Ricardo Garcia Fontes	
2006	Dom	Théo	Globo TV Special
2007	Paraíso Tropical	Ivan Correia Novaes	
2008	Ciranda de Pedra	Eduardo Ribeiro	
2008	Episódio Especial	Himself	Cameo
2009	Caminho das Índias	Tarso Cadore	
2009	Episódio Especial	Himself	Cameo
2010	Episódio Especial	Himself	Cameo
2010	Passione	Berillo Rondelli	
2011	Cordel Encantado	Timóteo Cabral	
2012	220 Volts	Himself	episode: "Fama"
2012	As Brasileiras	Zé Sereno	episode: "O Anjo de Alagoas"
2013	Joia Rara	Franz Hauser	
2014	Dupla Identidade	Eduardo Borges (Edu)	
2015	Tá no Ar		
2015	Babilônia	Murilo	
2016	Sol Nascente	Mario	
2017	Cidade Proibida	Samarone	
2018	O Sétimo Guardião	Gabriel Marsalla	
2022	Santo	Ernesto Cardona	

Film
Year	Title	Role	Notes
2002	As Vozes da Verdade	Lucas	Short film
2005	Racing Stripes	Listrado	Brazilian voice dubbing
2012	DES.	Klaus	Short film
2013	The Dognapper	Déco	
2013	Isolados	Lauro	
2019	Marighella	Lúcio	
2024	Biônicos	Heitor	

== Stage ==
- Um Certo Van Gogh
- Onde Está Você Agora?
