= Roger Moreira =

Brazilian musician (born 1956)

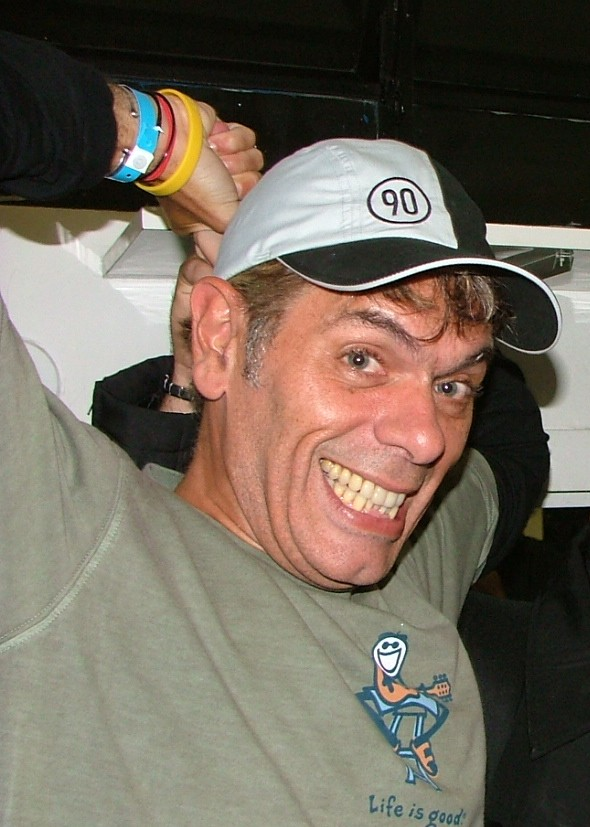

Background information
- Born: 12 September 1956 (age 69); São Paulo, Brazil
- Genres: Rock N' Roll, punk rock, comedy rock, Brazilian rock
- Occupations: Musician, singer-songwriter
- Instruments: Vocals, guitar
- Labels: Warner Music, Deckdisc

Roger Rocha Moreira (São Paulo, 12 September 1956) is a Brazilian musician. He is the guitarist, songwriter and singer of Ultraje a Rigor.
