= Giovanna Ewbank =

Brazilian actress, model and reporter

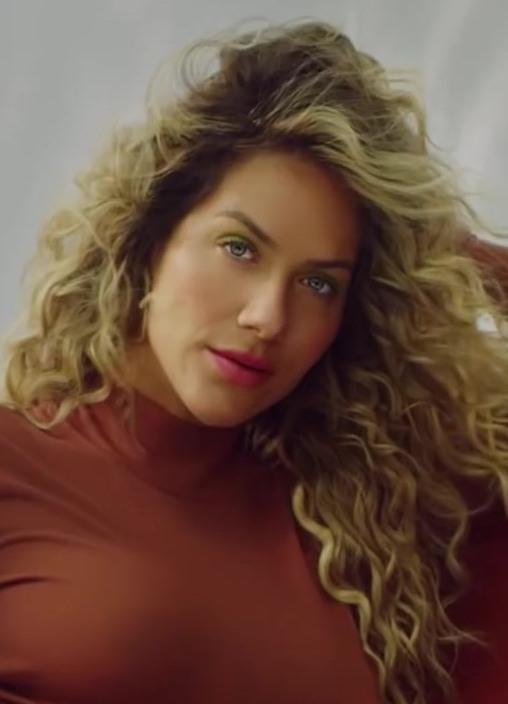
- Ewbank in 2020
- Born: Giovanna Ewbank Baldacconi; 14 September 1986 (age 39); São Paulo, Brazil
- Citizenship: Brazil; Italy
- Occupations: Actress, model, television presenter
- Years active: 2007–present
- Height: 1.66 m (5 ft 5 in)
- Spouse: Bruno Gagliasso (m. 2010)
- Children: 3

Giovanna Ewbank Baldacconi Gagliasso (Brazilian Portuguese pronunciation: [dʒoˈvɐnɐ iwˈbɛ̃k bawdaˈkoni gaˈʎasu]; born 14 September 1986) is a Brazilian actress, model, and television presenter.

== Career ==
She began acting in theater at the age of twelve. Next, she started modeling and later joined the university of Fashion. She studied theater, film and TV acting, when she got cast for the TV series Workout as the hick “Marcinha”. At that time, among some of her works were the catalog of Bumbum designer, beachwear, in November 2007, and the cover of Vizoo magazine, April 2008, besides having printed the cover of Corpo a Corpo in the same period.

In 2008, she debuted In the soap opera A Favorita, by Rede Globo, where she played Sharon, a call girl.

In 2015, she joined the team of the Video Show as a reporter and occasional presenter, luckily for her, in July 2016, she decided to leave Globo because they never actually offered her a permanent contract.

Currently, she has a YouTube channel with over four million subscribers.

== Personal life ==
Giovanna was born in São Paulo, Brazil. Her mother Deborah Ewbank is of Scottish descent and her father Roberto Baldacconi, is the son of Piero Baldacconi, born in Florence, and Anna Tonini, born in Milan.

She has been in a relationship with Brazilian actor Bruno Gagliasso since 2008. They married in 2010 and in July 2016 adopted a two-year-old African girl from Malawi, called Chissomo, whom they nicknamed Titi. In July 2019, the couple adopted a four-year-old boy named Bless, again from Malawi.

In December 2019 she announced she was pregnant.

In September 2022, Giovanna declared being demisexual in her videocast "Quem pode, pod".

== Filmography ==
=== Television ===
Year	Title	Role	TV station
2007	Malhação	Marcinha (Márcia de Souza)	Rede Globo
2008-2009	A Favorita	Maria do Perpétuo Socorro (Sharon)	Rede Globo
2010	Escrito nas Estrelas	Suely	Rede Globo
2012	Acampamento de Férias 3	Helena	Rede Globo
2013	O Dentista Mascarado	Xurupita Girl	Rede Globo
2013-2014	Joia Rara	Cristina	Rede Globo
2015	Babilônia	Vanessinha Pitbull (Vanessa)	Rede Globo
2015	Totalmente Demais	Herself	Rede Globo

=== TV presenter ===
Year	Title	TV station
2009	TV Globinho	Rede Globo
2015–2016 (eventual)	Video Show	Rede Globo

==== Reality shows ====
Year	Title	TV station
2013	Cachorrada Vip	Rede Globo
2014	Dança dos Famosos	Rede Globo
2019/2020	The Circle	Netflix

=== Film ===
Year	Title	Role
2017	Cars 3	Cruz Ramirez (Brazilian voice)
2023	Puss in Boots: The Last Wish	Goldilocks (Brazilian voice)

== Theater ==
Year	Title
2012	O Grande Amor da Minha Vida
