= Terceiro Tempo =

Brazilian radio and television program about football that aired from 1982 to 2023

- Genre: Sports talk show
- Created by: Sérgio Barbalho
- Directed by: Fernando Mitre; Dênis Gavazzi
- Presented by: Milton Neves; Lívia Nepomuceno
- Country of origin: Brazil
- Original language: Portuguese
- No. of seasons: 41 (radio); 21 (television)

Production
- Camera setup: Multi-camera
- Running time: 120 minutes

Original release
- Network: Jovem Pan
- Release: 5 July 1982 – 2005
- Network: RecordTV
- Release: 2 December 2001 – 2007
- Network: Rádio Bandeirantes
- Release: 2005 – 9 July 2023
- Network: Rede Bandeirantes
- Release: 2008 – 9 July 2023

Terceiro Tempo was a Brazilian sports talk show created by the journalist Milton Neves. Originally launched as a radio program on Jovem Pan on July 5, 1982, it became a television show on December 2, 2001, airing on RecordTV.

== History ==
Created by sports journalist Milton Neves, the program Terceiro Tempo was originally launched as a radio show on Jovem Pan, a radio station based in São Paulo, Brazil, on July 5, 1982. The idea was to create a talk show to discuss soccer and the latest round of national championships. The show's premiere took place on the same day that the Brazilian national team was eliminated by the Italian national team, 3–2, at the 1982 FIFA World Cup, held in Spain.

On December 2, 2001, it became a television show, broadcast by RecordTV. The network aired the show until December 16, 2007. In 2008, Milton moved to TV Bandeirantes, continuing to host Terceiro Tempo at the new chanell. On the radio, he remained with Jovem Pan until 2005, and that same year, he began hosting the show on Rádio Bandeirantes, also based in São Paulo, in the Morumbi neighborhood. The show was off the air for a brief period between April 15, 2018, and January 20, 2019, and was replaced by the third season of Show do Esporte.

On June 8, 2023, columnist Flávio Ricco of the R7 website reported that Rede Bandeirantes had officially announced, for the second time, the end of the television program four years after its return to Sundays, with the announcement being confirmed by the network itself and the show’s host. One of the reasons cited for the program’s cancellation was to protect Milton Neves’s health. The final television episode aired on July 9. On that same date, without prior notice, the program also aired for the last time on Rádio Bandeirantes. On both platforms, the program’s time slots were subsequently filled by Apito Final, hosted by former fottball player Neto.

== Hosts ==
During the show's run on television, it featured the following hosts:

- Milton Neves (2001—20123)
- Daniela Freitas (2001—2002)
- Renata Fan (2003—2007)
- Larissa Erthal (2014—2020)
- Yara Fantoni (2020—2021)
- Lívia Nepomuceno (2021—2023)
