= Agora É Tarde =

- Genre: Talk show
- Created by: Danilo Gentili
- Presented by: Danilo Gentili (2011–2013); Rafinha Bastos (2014–2015)
- Country of origin: Brazil
- Original language: Portuguese
- No. of seasons: 3

Production
- Camera setup: Multi-camera
- Running time: 60 minutes
- Production company: Eyeworks

Original release
- Network: Band
- Release: 29 June 2011 – 27 March 2015

Related
- Chelsea Lately; Late Night

Agora É Tarde (English: It's Too Late (Note: The translation of Agora É Tarde to English is Now It's Late, but the broadcaster Rede Bandeirantes has named the show as It's Too Late for English reference.)) was a Brazilian late-night talk show produced by Eyeworks and broadcast by Rede Bandeirantes since 2011. The show was created and hosted by Danilo Gentili, until 2013, when he moved to SBT. Rafinha Bastos substituted him as host of the show until its cancellation in 2015. It was the second most successful show by Bandeirantes.

== Synopsis ==
Agora É Tarde, is a humorous current affairs program hosted by Danilo Gentili between 2011 and 2013. According to Gentili, the show follows a politically correct line rather than the style used by CQC's members. Gentili also described his show as "a show where we would like to watch". Since 2014 this program is hosted by Rafinha Bastos.

== Events ==
Since 20 September 2012, the show took over the slot on Tuesday formerly occupied by Os Anjos do Sexo.

Since 24 January 2012, the show has been simultaneously broadcast on radio station BandNews FM.

The show reached its 100th broadcast on 6 April 2012. During the celebration, Gentilli announced that the show would be broadcast also on Fridays – becoming a daily broadcast.

On 28 March 2012, humorist Marcelo Mansfield had a fake argument with Léo Lins (also a humorist) on the show. This argument was only a viral April Fools' Day prank.

== Reception ==
The show did not initially have any sponsors and not many celebrities were willing to be interviewed by Gentili. The show created new segments, focusing on a lighter type of humor, rather than the black or aggressive humor used on CQC. Within four months, the show became one of the most popular shows at Rede Bandeirantes and had favourable reviews.
