= Irreligion in India =

Atheism and agnosticism have a long history in India and flourish within the Śramaṇa movement. Indian religions like Jainism, Buddhism and some sects of Hinduism can be considered non-theistic or transtheistic. These schools of thought consider spirituality without necessarily the existence of a Supreme God. While a degree of doubt has been ingrained in Indian spiritual culture, a large proportion of atheists/agnostics face societal stigma and have to hide their irreligious identity. As a result, many irreligious mark their Family religion on Government forms and Census. This makes it difficult to ascertain the spread of irreligion in India.

India has produced some notable atheist politicians and social reformers. Around 0.7 million people in India did not state their religion in the 2001 census and were counted in the "religion not stated" category. They constituted 0.06% of India's population. Their number has significantly increased four times, from 0.7 million in the 2001 census to 2.9 million in the 2011 census (0.24% of India's population) at an average annual rate of 15%. According to the 2012 WIN-Gallup Global Index of Religion and Atheism report, 81% of Indians were religious, 13% were non-religious, 3% were convinced atheists, and 3% were unsure or did not respond, while a demographic study by Cambridge University Press in 2004 found that around 2-6% of Indians identified as atheists or irreligious.

== Indian History ==
=== Ancient India ===
Several śramaṇa movements are known to have existed in India before the 6th century BCE (pre-Buddha, pre-Mahavira), and these influenced both the āstika and nāstika traditions of Indian philosophy. Martin Wiltshire says that the Śramaṇa tradition grew in India over two stages: the Paccekabuddha stage was the tradition of the individual ascetic, and the Savaka stage was the tradition of the disciples. Buddhism and Jainism eventually grew out of these two stages as different religions. These traditions drew upon already established Brahmanical concepts, states Wiltshire, to formulate their own doctrines. Reginald Ray concurs that Śramaṇa movements already existed and were established traditions in pre-6th century BCE India, but disagrees with Wiltshire that they were nonsectarian before the arrival of Buddha.

==== Schools of Philosophy ====
In Indian philosophy, there are six major orthodox (astika) schools of Hindu philosophy—Nyaya, Vaisheshika, Samkhya, Yoga, Mīmāṃsā and Vedanta, and five major heterodox (nāstika) schools of Śramaṇa —Jain, Buddhist, Ajivika, Ajñana, and Cārvāka. The four most studied Nāstika schools, those rejecting the doctrine of Vedas, are Jainism, Buddhism, Cārvāka, and Ājīvika.

===== Charvaka =====
There is no heaven, no final liberation, nor any soul in another world, Nor do the actions of the four classes, orders, etc., produce any real effect.

— from the Sarvadarśanasaṅgraha, attributed to Bṛhaspati

The Cārvāka school originated in India around the 6th century BCE. It is classified as a nāstika school. It is noteworthy as evidence of a materialistic movement in ancient India. Followers of this school only accepted pratyakṣa (perception) as a valid pramāna (evidence). They considered other pramāna like śabda (testimony), upamāna (analogy), and anumāna (inference) as unreliable. As a result, perception could not support the existence of God or the soul (tman). They also considered everything to be made of four elements: earth, water, air, and fire. The Cārvāka pursued enjoyment of life and the elimination of physical pain. So, they can be considered hedonistic. All of the original Cārvāka texts are considered lost. A much-quoted sūtra (Barhaspatya sutras) by Bṛhaspati, who is considered the founder of the school, is thought to be lost. The Tattvopaplavasiṃha by Jayarāśi Bhaṭṭa (8th century CE) and the Sarvadarśanasaṅgraha by Madhavacarya (13th century) are considered important secondary Cārvāka texts.

===== Sāṃkhya =====
Sāṃkhya is an āstika school but has some atheistic elements. Sāṃkhya is a radically dualist philosophy. They believed that the two ontological principles, puruṣa (consciousness) and prakṛti (matter), were the underlying foundation of the universe. The objective of life is considered to be the separation of pure consciousness from matter (kaivalya). The reasoning within this system led to the Nir-īśvara Sāṃkhya (Sāṃkhya without God) philosophy, which deemed the existence of God as unnecessary. There is the opposing reasoning that accepts God, called Sesvara Sāṃkhya (Sāṃkhya with God). Samkhya Karika (c. 350 CE) is the earliest known systematic text of this philosophy.

===== Mīmāṃsā =====
Mīmāṃsā (meaning exegesis) is also an āstika school. They believed the Vedas to be author-less and self-authenticating. They did not accept the Vedas as being composed by any ṛṣi (saint), they considered them to not be authored by anyone (apauruṣeya). They accepted the minor deities of the Vedas but resisted any notion of a Supreme Creator (Brahman). They only concentrated on upholding the ṛta (order) by following the duties of the Vedas. The foundational text of this school is the Mīmāṃsā Sutra by Jaimini (c. 200 BCE – 200 CE).

===== Ājīvika =====
Ājīvika is yet another nāstika school with an atheistic outlook. None of their scriptures survive, and there is some question as to whether or not the accounts of them in secondary sources (often hostile) are accurate. They believed in a naturalistic atomic theory and held that the consequences of natural laws led to a deterministic universe. They denied karma but upheld the ātman. They lived in ascetic communities and existed in southern India until at least the 14th century.

===== Buddhism and Jainism =====
Jainism rejects the idea of a creator deity responsible for the manifestation, creation, or maintenance of this universe. According to Jain doctrine, the universe and its constituents (soul, matter, space, time, and principles of motion) have always existed. Along with this, as 'universal natural laws govern all of the components and actions, an immaterial being like God cannot create a material being like the universe'. Jainism offers an elaborate cosmology, including heavenly beings (devas), but these beings are not viewed as creators; they are subject to suffering and change like all other living beings and must eventually die. Jains define godliness as the inherent quality of any soul characterised by infinite bliss, infinite power, Kevala Jñāna (pure infinite knowledge), and perfect peace. However, these qualities of a soul are subdued due to the karmas of the soul. One who achieves this state of soul through right belief, right knowledge and right conduct can be termed a god. This perfection of the soul is called kevalin. A soul thus becomes a liberated soul—liberated of miseries, cycles of rebirth, the world, karmas, and finally of the body as well. This is called moksha.

Gautama Buddha rejected the existence of a creator deity, refused to endorse many views on creation, and stated that questions on the origin of the world are not ultimately useful for ending suffering. Buddhism instead emphasises the system of causal relationships underlying the universe, pratītyasamutpāda, which constitutes the dhamma and source of enlightenment. No dependence of phenomena on a supernatural reality is asserted in order to explain the behaviour of matter.

==== Philosophers and ancient texts ====
Ajita Kesakambali was a materialist philosopher. He is mentioned in the Samaññaphala Sutta. He rejected gods, an afterlife and karma. Payasi is a character, referred to as a prince, who appears in the Buddhist text Digha Nikaya in the Payasi Sutta. He did not believe in rebirth or karma. He debated with Kassapa, a disciple of Buddha, and lost according to Buddhist sources.

===== Jabali's speech from the Ramayana =====
In the Hindu epic Ramayana (in the Ayodhyā Kāṇḍa), when Bharata goes to the forest to convince Rama to return home, he was accompanied by a sophist called Jabali ("जाबालिः"). Jabali uses nihilistic reasoning to convince Rama. He also says that rituals are a waste of food and scriptures were written by smart men so that people will give alms. Rama then calls him a deviant from the path of dharma ("धरमपथात"), refuses to accept his "nāstika" views and blames his own father for taking Jabali into service. He also equates the Buddha to a thief. On hearing Rama's retort, Jabali retracts his statements, saying that he was merely arguing like a nihilist. However, these verses referring to the Buddha are considered a later interpolation, as those verses use a different metre.

===== The Carvaka incident in the Mahabharata =====
A character described as a Carvaka briefly appears in the Mahabharata (in the Shanti Parva). As Yudhishthira enters the city of Hastinapur, a brahmin, referred to as Carvaka, accuses him of killing his own kinsmen and says that he would suffer for it. The accuser is revealed to be a rakshasa in disguise, who was a friend of Duryodhana. He had existed since the Satya Yuga by virtue of a boon from the god Brahma, that he could only be killed when he is showing contempt towards brahmins. He was killed by other brahmins by the chanting of sacred hymns and Yudhishthira was assured that his actions were within the kshatriya code. This event may be a possible denigration of the Carvaka philosophy.

=== Medieval India ===
In the 9th century CE, Jain philosopher Jinasena wrote the Mahapurana. The book contains the following often quoted words,

Some foolish men declare that a creator made the world. The doctrine that the world was created is ill-advised, and should be rejected. If God created the world, where was he before creation? If you say he was transcendent then, and needed no support, where is he now?

This quote was also featured later in Carl Sagan's book, Cosmos. In the 14th century, philosopher Madhavacarya wrote the Sarva-Darsana-Sangraha, which is a compilation of all Indian philosophies, including Carvaka, which is described in the first chapter.

=== Modern India ===
==== 19th century ====
Between 1882 and 1888, the Madras Secular Society published a magazine called The Thinker (Tattuvavivesini in Tamil) from Madras. The magazine carried articles written by anonymous writers and republished articles from the journal of the London Secular Society, which the Madras Secular Society considered itself affiliated to.

==== 20th century ====
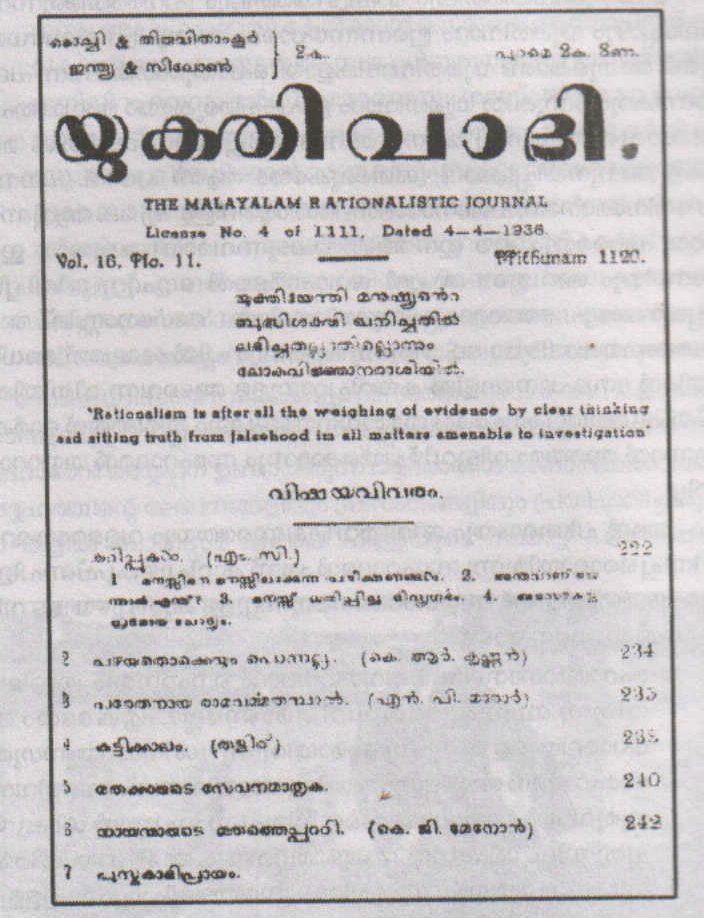
The Yukthivadi in 1929 was the first atheist/rationalist magazine published in Malayalam.

Twentieth century India too experienced multiple spiritualism activism trends which weighed in favor of spirituality over religion and rituals.

Periyar E. V. Ramasamy (1879–1973) was an atheist and rationalist leader of the Self-Respect Movement and Dravidar Kazhagam. His views on irreligion are based on the eradication of the caste system, thinking religion must be denied to achieve its obliteration.

Goparaju Ramachandra Rao (1902–1975), better known by his nom de guerre "Gora", was a social reformer, anti-caste activist, atheist and disciple of Mahatma Gandhi. He and his wife, Saraswathi Gora (1912–2006) who was also an atheist and social reformer, founded the Atheist Centre in 1940. The Atheist Centre is an institute working for social change. Gora expounded his philosophy of positive atheism as a way of life. He later wrote more about positive atheism in his 1972 book, Positive Atheism. Gora also organised the first World Atheist Conference in 1972. Subsequently, the Atheist Centre has organised several World Atheist Conferences in Vijayawada and other locations.

Abraham Kovoor (10 April 1898 – 18 September 1978) was an Indian professor and rationalist who gained prominence after retirement for his campaign to expose as frauds various Indian and Sri Lankan "god-men" and so-called paranormal phenomena. His direct, trenchant criticism of spiritual frauds and organized religions was enthusiastically received by audiences, initiating a new dynamism in the rationalist movement, especially in Sri Lanka and India.

Jawaharlal Nehru (1889–1964), India's first Prime Minister was a Hindu agnostic and a self-styled scientific humanist. He wrote in his autobiography, Toward Freedom (1936), about his views on religion and superstition.

Meghnad Saha (1893–1956) was an atheist astrophysicist best known for his development of the Saha ionisation equation, used to describe chemical and physical conditions in stars.

Bhagat Singh (1907–1931), an Indian revolutionary and socialist nationalist who was hanged for using violence against British government officials, was a staunch atheist. He laid out his views in the essay "Why I Am an Atheist", written in jail shortly before his execution.

Vinayak Damodar Savarkar (1883–1966) was an eminent Hindu nationalist leader of the Indian independence movement. He was also an atheist and a staunch rationalist who disapproved of orthodox Hindu belief, dismissing cow worship as superstitious. Being Hindu, for him, was a cultural and political identity (conceptualised in the form of Hindutva).

Joseph Edamaruku (7 September 1934 – 29 June 2006), popularly identified by his surname Edamaruku, was a journalist and rationalist from Kerala. He was the Delhi Bureau chief of the Malayalam magazine Keralasabdam for more than twenty years, and the founder-editor of Therali, a rationalist periodical in Malayalam. He was president of the Indian Rationalist Association from 1995 to 2005.

Khushwant Singh (1915–2014), a prominent and prolific writer of Sikh extraction, was avowedly non-religious.

Founded in 1984 Tarksheel Society (Rationalist Society) is a rationalist group based in Punjab, India.

Maharashtra Andhashraddha Nirmulan Samiti (Committee for Eradication of Blind Faith, CEBF) is an organisation dedicated to fighting superstition in India, particularly in the state of Maharashtra. It was founded by Narendra Dabholkar in 1989.

In 1997, the Federation of Indian Rationalist Associations was founded.

==== 21st century ====
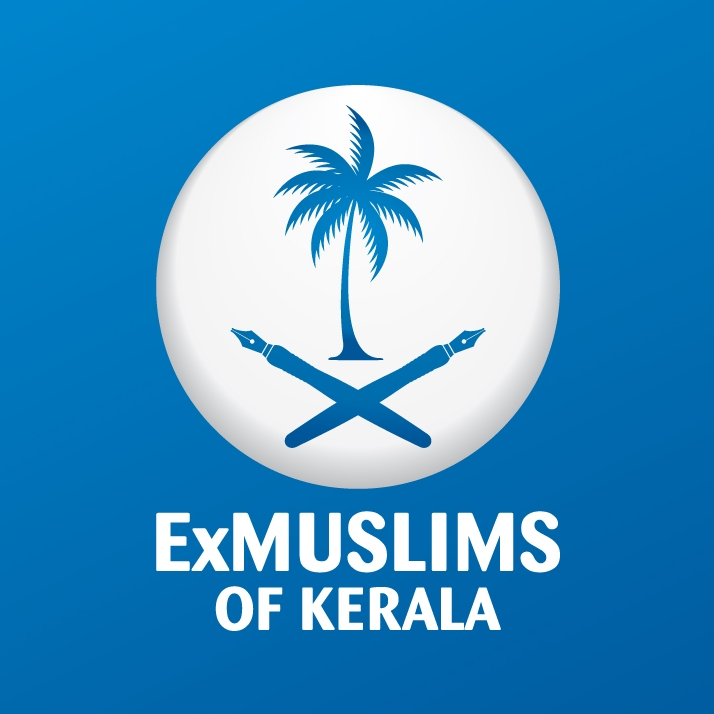
Ex Muslims of Kerala logo depicting a coconut tree and pens representing Kerala and knowledge, counter to Saudi Arabia's logo of palm tree with swords

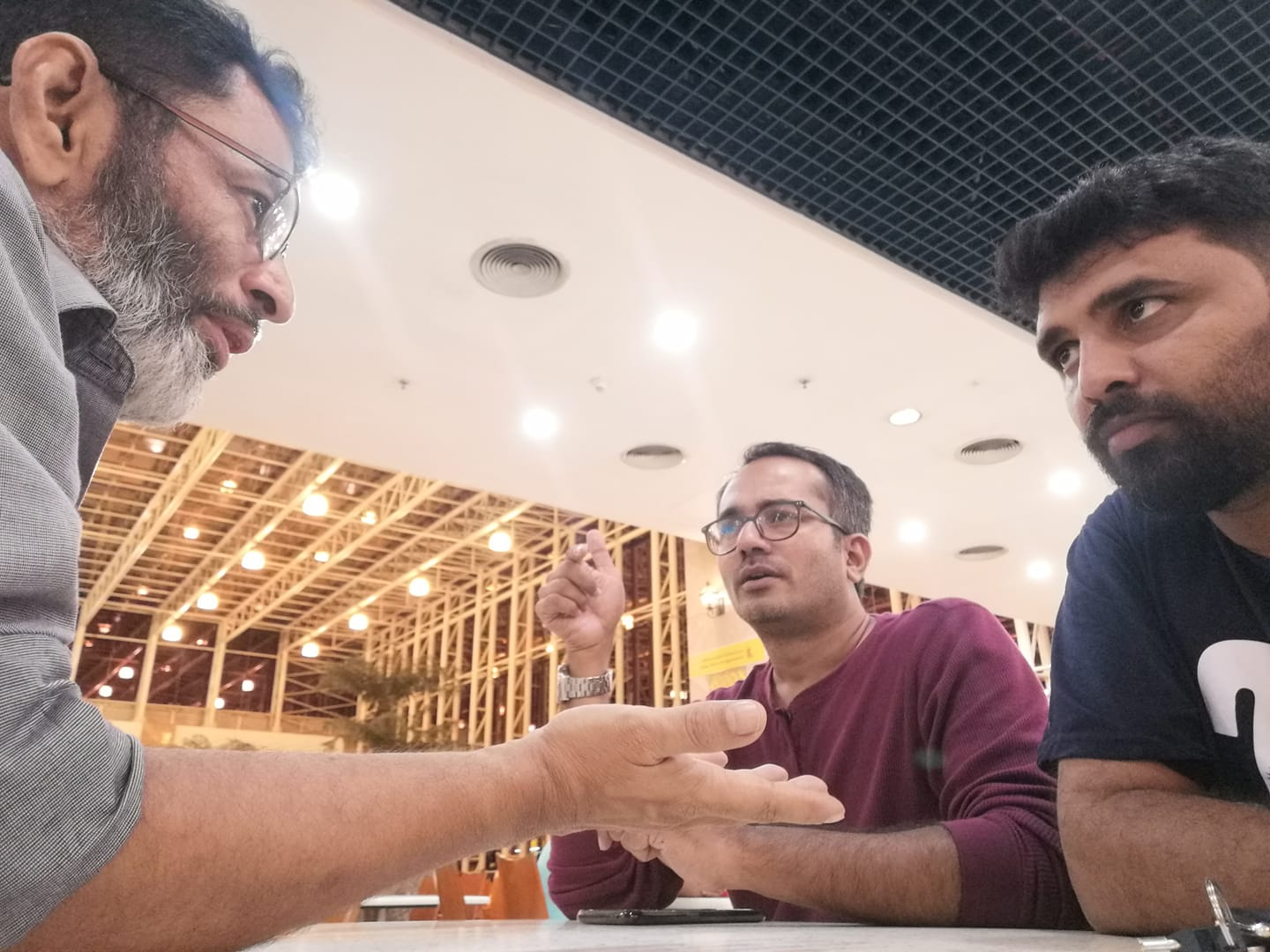
EA Jabbar with ex Muslims Arif Hussain Theruvath (President, Non-Religious Citizens) and Liyakkathali C. M. (President ex-Muslims of Kerala)

Amartya Sen (born 1933), an Indian economist, philosopher and Nobel laureate, is an atheist and he holds that this can be associated with one of the atheist schools in Hinduism, the Lokayata.

Sunday Sapiens, the successor of Maharashtra Rationalist Association, is actively involved in developing scientific temper and eradicating superstition.

In 2008, the website Nirmukta was founded. It later became an organisation aiming to promote free thought and secular humanism in India.

In 2009, historian Meera Nanda published a book entitled The God Market. It examines how Hindu religiosity is gaining more popularity among the rising middle class, as India is liberalising the economy and adopting globalisation.

In March 2009, in Kerala, a pastoral letter addressing the laity was issued by the Kerala Catholic Bishops' Council urging the members to not vote for political parties which advocate atheism. In July 2010, another similar letter was issued.

On 10 March 2012, Sanal Edamaruku investigated a so-called miracle in Vile Parle, where a Jesus statue had started weeping and concluded that the problem was caused by faulty drainage. Later that day, during a TV discussion with some church members, Edamaruku accused the Catholic Church of miracle-mongering. On 10 April, Angelo Fernandes, President of the Maharashtra Christian Youth Forum, filed a police complaint against Edamaruku under the Indian Penal Code Section 295A. In July while on a tour in Finland, Edamaruku was informed by a friend that his house was visited by the police. Since the offence is not bailable, Edamaruku stayed in Finland.

On Friday 7 July 2013, the first "Hug an Atheist Day" was organised in India by Nirmukta. The event aimed to spread awareness and reduce the stigma associated with being an atheist.

On 20 August 2013, Narendra Dabholkar, a rationalist and anti-superstition campaigner, was shot dead by two unknown assailants, while he was out on a morning walk.

According to Sultan Shahin of progressive New Age Islam, more Indian Muslims are now questioning their own religion, some consider themselves just cultural Muslim and some consider themselves even as ex-Muslims.

Nastik Nation, an organization was started in the year 2015. This organisation has translated and published the international bestseller, God Delusion and The Greatest Show on Earth by Richard Dawkins in many Indian languages.

On 17 March 2017, H. Farook, an ex-Muslim atheist, was murdered by Muslim radical group in Coimbatore. The murders of Farook joined their close and hidden ex-Muslim organization pretending to be ex-Muslims who has understood the hollow falsehood of Islam and Quran. Later one day they called Farook saying that one of their bikes was out of petrol and needed him to come with some. They attacked in a group and murdered him. It is reported that the group involved practiced thefts and plundering at night and distributed a share of it to the nearby slums.

On 9 January 2021, E.A.Jabbar, freethinker, atheist, and rationalist from Kerala and Islamic preacher M.M. Akbar were engaged in a debate on the Quran. Both sides claimed to have defeated the other debater even as there was no clear verdict.

In August 2021, Abdul Khader Puthiyangadi, an Indian citizen and rationalist from Kerala, was arrested by the UAE police in 2021 without bail and sentenced to prison in the UAE for three years for criticizing Islam on social media in his native language Malayalam.

On 10 January 2022, ex-Muslim rationalist Aneesh Jasy from Tamil Nadu was arrested without bail over his Facebook posts against Islam.

===== Rise of ex-Muslims of Kerala =====
In 2021 in Kerala, several ex-Muslims formed an organisation called Ex-Muslims of Kerala. It is an organisation founded in 2021 by E. A. Jabbar, Liyakkathali CM, Arif Hussain, and a few others who left Islam in Kerala. The organisation gives support to those who left Islam, a minority that is facing persecution from the Islamic community because of their leaving. The organisation conducts debates with Islamic scholars and fundamentalists on various topics. Ex-Muslims of Kerala observe 9 January as ex-Muslim day as the remembrance of E. A. Jabbar's debate with Islamic preacher M. M. Akbar, by conducting seminars on atheism and Islam.

===== Liyakkathali–Rahul Easwar debate - Slavery in Islam =====
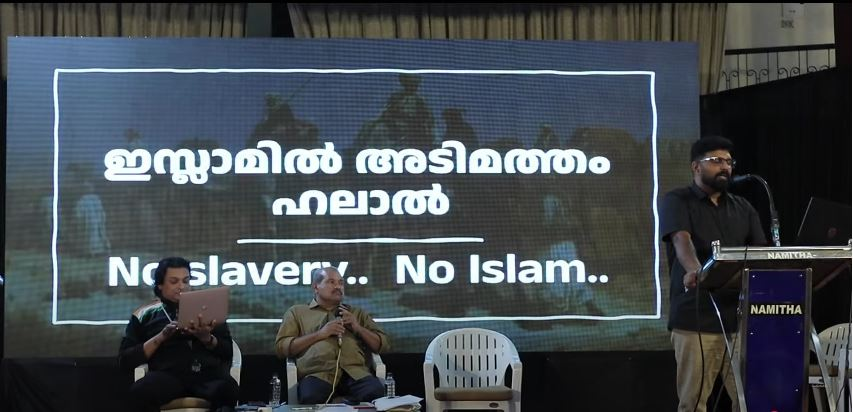
Debate between Liyakkathali CM and Rahul Easwar on slavery in Islam, 23 August 2025.

In August 2025, a controversy arose over organizing a debate on slavery in Islam between members of the Ex-Muslim community and Islamic groups in Kerala. Members of the Ex-Muslim collective, including Liyakkathali C. M., were initially challenged by Abdullah Basil of the Wisdom Islamic Group (associated with Salafi–Wahhabi circles) to participate in such a debate. Arif Hussain expressed willingness to debate, but only in a public setting, while Basil’s team proposed holding the discussion exclusively on their own online platforms. Liyakkathali rejected an online debate, arguing that moderation would not be neutral, and instead suggested a neutral studio. The Wisdom group, however, insisted on their own studio in Pullikkal, Malappuram, leading to a stalemate. Liyakkathali had openly invited and challenged Islamic preachers in Kerala to participate, none came forward, reportedly out of concern that such a public debate might encourage more individuals to leave Islam

To ensure the debate took place, Liyakkathali eventually invited Indian public intellectual and activist Rahul Easwar, who was already engaged in discussions on jihad and Islamic apologetics. On 23 August 2025, a public debate between Liyakkathali and Rahul Easwar was held at the Wagon Tragedy Memorial Town Hall in Tirur, Malappuram district, Kerala on the topic on Slavery in Islam.

== Legal status, rights and laws ==
Atheism and irreligion not officially recognised in India. Apostasy is allowed under the right to freedom of religion in the Constitution. According to advocate Asim Sarode, along with constitutional freedom religion and conscience, freedom of expression helps protect atheists in India. Sarode says, Article 51A (h) of Indian constitution expects all Indian citizens a duty to inculcate “scientific temper, humanism and spirit of inquiry and reform.” The Special Marriage Act, 1954 allows the marriage of people with no religious beliefs, as well as non-religious and non-ritualistic marriages. However, there are no specific laws catering to atheists and they are considered as belonging to the religion of their birth for administrative purposes. The box in which the 'caste' and 'religion' are to be filled is still present in a lot of forms. Some of these boxes on forms are also compulsory, and one does not always have the option of leaving them empty. The closest option one gets is 'Choose not to say' or 'Other' as an answer to these boxes.

Ravi Kumar, an atheist from Haryana is another person who is struggling and fighting to be officially and legally irreligious and caste-less in India. He went to court to declare him officially atheist and he got one certificate in which it was mentioned that he had "No Caste, No Religion, & No God". Later, Justice Tejinder Singh Dhindsa of the Punjab and Haryana High Court said they had exceeded their authority and asked him to return the certificate; he refused to do so. The Fatehabad district authorities who issued the certificate withdrew it in April 2019. Kumar plans to continue his quest to be officially declared an atheist.

Sneha Parthibaraja, a lawyer from Vellore was the first citizen in India to get an official 'no religion, no caste' certificate. She won this right on 5 February 2019, after a nine-year court battle. Indian actor Kamal Haasan, who is known for his atheism, congratulated her on Twitter for this achievement.

=== Notable verdicts ===
On 29 October 2013, the Bombay High Court judged in favour of an atheist school teacher from Nashik. Sanjay Salve had been employed by the state-funded Savitribai Phule Secondary School since 1996. In June 2007, during a prayer session, Salve did not fold his hands during the pledge or prayer. The school management called this indiscipline and refused him a higher pay grade in 2008 when Salve became eligible for it. Salve sought legal recourse citing the article 28 (a) of the Constitution which states "no person attending any educational institution recognised by the State or receiving aid out of State funds shall be required to take part in any religious instruction that may be imparted in such institution or to attend any religious worship that may be conducted in such institution". The court ruled in Salve's favour and directed the school to release his dues by 31 January 2014.

On 23 September 2014, the Bombay High Court declared that the government cannot force a person to state a religion on any document or form. The court also stated any citizen has the right to declare that he/she does not belong to any religion. The decision came in response to a Public Interest Litigation (PIL) filed by Ranjit Mohite, Kishore Nazare and Subhash Ranware, representing an organisation called Full Gospel Church of God, after the Maharashtra state printing press refused to issue them a gazette notification stating that they belonged to no religion. The petitioners stated that the organisation had 4000 members, and that they believe in Jesus Christ but they do not follow Christianity or any religion. Responding to the petition, the Maharashtra and the central governments had stated that "no religion" cannot be treated as a religion on official forms. The court cited the Article 25 of the Constitution, which guarantees right to freedom of conscience, while passing the verdict.

== Persecution and attacks ==
According to Jaswant Zirakh of the Tarksheel Society, Indians are usually comfortable with atheist concepts, but usually it involves popular religious leadership and godmen tending to attack atheism since they tend to worry about losing their power and income. Among the Indian Muslim communities, atheists worry of backlash, they and their families may face social boycott and ostracism including stopping them in participation of funerary rites of their dear ones.

Narendra Nayak, an advocate of atheism, has claimed to have been attacked three times and had his scooter damaged twice, with one of the attacks leaving him with head injuries. This compelled him to take self-defence lessons and carry a nunchaku. Megh Raj Mitter's house was surrounded by a mob after he debunked the Hindu milk miracle, forcing him to call the police.

On 15 March 2007, a bounty of ₹7 lakh (equivalent to ₹23 lakh or US$24,000 in 2026) was announced on atheist Bangladeshi author Taslima Nasrin, while living in India, by a Muslim cleric named Maulana Tauqeer Raza Khan for allegedly writing derogatory statements about Muhammad in her work. In December 2013, an FIR was filed against Nasrin in Bareilly by a cleric named Hasan Raza Khan, for hurting religious sentiments. Nasrin had allegedly tweeted on Twitter that "In India, criminals who issue fatwas against women don't get punished." Raza Khan said that by accusing clerics of being criminals, Nasrin had hurt religious sentiments.

On 2 July 2011, the house of U. Kalanathan, secretary of the Kerala Yukthivadi Sangham, was attacked in Vallikunnu after he suggested on television that the temple treasures of Padmanabhaswamy Temple should be used for public welfare.

On 16 February 2015, rationalist Govind Pansare and his wife were attacked by unknown gunmen. He later died from the wounds on 20 February. On 30 August 2015, M. M. Kalburgi, a scholar and rationalist, was shot dead at his home. He was known for his criticism of superstition and idol worship. Soon afterwards, another rationalist and author, K. S. Bhagwan, received a threatening letter. He had offended religious groups by criticizing the Bhagavad Gita.

== Demographics ==
=== Indian government census ===
The Indian census does not explicitly count atheists. In the 2011 Census of India, the response form required the respondent to choose from six options under religion. The "Others" option was meant for minor or tribal religions as well as atheists and agnostics.

The religion data from 2011 Census of India was released in August 2015. It revealed that about 2,870,000 people had stated no religion in their response, about 0.27% of the nation's population. However, the number included atheists, rationalists and also those who believed in a higher power. K. Veeramani, a Dravidar Kazhagam leader, said that it was the first time the number of non-religious people was recorded in the census. However, he added that he believed that the number of atheists in India was actually higher as many people do not reveal their atheism out of fear of discrimination.

=== Different surveys ===
==== World Values Survey (2006) ====
According to the 2006 World Values Survey, conducted by the Dentsu Communication Institute Inc, Japan Research Center (2006), 6.6% of Indians stated that they had no religion.

==== WIN-Gallup Global Index of Religion and Atheism (2005 and 2012) ====
According to the 2005 Global Index of Religion and Atheism report from WIN-Gallup, 87% of Indians were religious and 4% called themselves atheists. According to the 2012 report by the same organisation, 81% of Indians were religious, 13% were non-religious, 3% were convinced atheists and 3% were unsure or did not respond.

==== Worldviews and Opinions of Scientists in India (2007) ====
In 2007, a survey was conducted by the Institute for the Study of Secularism in Society and culture of the Trinity College with the help of Center for Inquiry (India) called 'Worldviews and Opinions of Scientists in India'. 1100 scientists were surveyed from 130 institutes. Most of them identified themselves as secular (59%) or somewhat secular (16%) but refused to be labelled irreligious. 83% defined secularism, as it appears in the Indian constitutions, as the separation of state and religion. But, 93% also defined it as tolerance of other religious philosophies. 20% equated secularism to atheism. Only 11% called themselves completely not spiritual. However, 8% reportedly said they would refuse to do stem cell research based on religious or moral convictions. Y. S. Rajan commented on this saying that most Indians do not feel there is a conflict between science and religion. Other the hand, Innaiah Narisetti, chairman of Centre for Inquiry (India) and Pushpa Bhargava, the former director of the Centre for Cellular and Molecular Biology, pointed out the lack of scientific temper among Indian scientists.

==== Religion Among Scientists in an International Context (2014) ====
In a survey conducted by Elaine Howard Ecklund of Rice University, it was found that:

	India	United Kingdom
Scientists who identified as nonreligious	6%	65%
Scientists who attend religious services on a regular basis (once a month or more)	32%	12%
Scientists who never attend religious services	19%	68%
Scientists who believe that there are basic truths in many religions	73%	49%
Scientists who believe in God	27%	11%
Scientists who believe in a higher power of some kind	38%	8%

The ongoing study has surveyed 1,581 scientists from UK and 1,763 from India.

==== Gallup International Association (2022) ====
A 2022 Gallup International Association survey found that 18% of Indians did not believe in God, equating to around two hundred million of the population.

== Notable Indian atheists ==
- Jawaharlal Nehru
- Bhagat Singh
- Subrahmanyan Chandrasekhar
- Meghnad Saha
- Jiddu Krishnamurti
- Periyar
- Narendra Dabholkar
- Govind Pansare
- Gauri Lankesh
- C. V. Raman
- Jyotirao Phule
- Savitribai Phule
- Abraham T. Kovoor
- Javed Akhtar
- Zubeen Garg
- Zoya Akhtar
- Shriram Lagoo
- Farhan Akhtar
- Bhaichung Bhutia
- Ileana D'Cruz
- S. S. Rajamouli
- Rajneesh
- Prakash Raj
- Vijay Sethupathi
- Kamal Haasan
- M. K. Stalin
- Ram Gopal Varma
- Amartya Sen
- Ravichandran C
- Mani Ratnam
- Gauhar Raza
- Vidyanand Bapat

== See also ==
- Hindu atheism
- Freedom of religion in India
- Hate speech laws in India
- Irreligion
- Religion in India
- Religious skepticism
- Secular humanism
- Secularism in India
- Superstition in India
