= The Great Tantra Challenge =

2008 challenge by a skeptic

Edamaruku (left) and Sharma during the live broadcast of the challenge

The Great Tantra Challenge was the challenge put forward to Surinder Sharma, a tantrik, by Sanal Edamaruku, the president of Rationalist International to kill him on live TV using only the magical powers he claims to possess. The challenge ended after several hours, with Edamaruku surviving unharmed. The event was broadcast live on India TV in March 2008.

== Background ==
After a politician made accusations that her opponents were using Tantra to hurt her, India TV put together a panel to discuss Tantric Power versus Science. Sanal Edamaruku was invited to represent the science side while Surinder Sharma, who is a well known tantric, was invited to represent the other side. At one point in the discussion Sharma claimed he could use his powers to kill a person within three minutes, which Edamaruku turned into a challenge, offering himself as a test subject.

== Outcome ==
The initial attempt took place on live daytime television. Sharma tried to intimidate Edamaruku by sprinkling water on him, brandishing a knife all over his body, Sharma put his hand on Edamaruku's head, ruffled his hair, covered his eyes, pressed down on his forehead. When Sharma pressed steadily harder, in a manner Edamaruku described as "hard enough to kill me the conventional way", the umpiring anchor cautioned Sharma to use Tantra only. After several failed attempts to kill Edamaruku, Sharma suggested that Edamaruku must have been being protected by a powerful god whom he served. Edamaruku replied that he was an atheist.

After nearly two hours without success, the programme was overrunning the channel's schedule. Sharma asked to stage an "ultimate destruction ceremony" which could only be performed at night, and the show was extended to accommodate it. Several hundred million viewers watched that night. A ceremony was performed on an altar under the open night sky, in the hour before midnight. Sharma was accompanied by a group of tantric chanters. A piece of paper with Edamaruku's name on it was torn into pieces, dipped in butter and thrown into a fire. A clod of wheat that Edamaruku had touched had nails pierced through it, was cut into pieces and thrown into a fire. The challenge ended with a dramatic countdown, and Edamaruku was not killed.

Edamaruku laughed throughout the programme, partly because he found the whole affair absurd but mainly to reassure viewers they need not fear for his safety.

The event, dubbed The Great Tantra Challenge, was highly publicized and received a high number of viewers. Surinder had to give up and the tantric's reputation was dealt a blow. The story spread across the Internet in many languages.

The lead character in the popular 2014 Hindi movie PK was inspired by Edamaruku's Great Tantra Challenge.
