= Dakshina Kannada Rationalist Association =

Indian organization

Dakshina Kannada Rationalist Association (DKRA) is a well known rationalist group based in Mangalore, Karnataka, which promotes skepticism. It was formed in 1976 at the initiative of a few individuals led by Narendra Nayak. DKRA, now a member of Federation of Indian Rationalist Associations, was initially formed to host the talk by Abraham Kovoor, the eminent rationalist from Sri Lanka who was then touring India as part of his Miracle Exposure Campaign.

== Activities ==
The DKRA attempts to oppose superstition and pseudoscience in India. Often in association with other rationalist organisations in India and abroad, the DKRA has led media and educational campaigns debunking the purportedly supernatural feats of godmen. The group critiques paranormal and pseudoscientific claims including psychic surgery, inexhaustible oil lamps, materialization of holy ash, and pyrokinesis.

Working with the Indian Rationalist Association, the DKRA opposed a 2009 proposal to make yoga a compulsory subject for high school and primary school students in Mangalore.
