= Superstition in India =

Superstitions in India are prevalent and are based on myths, legends, fables, traditions and stories.

People stop if a black cat crosses their path, or if someone sneezes, auspicious work is postponed. Common superstitions in India today include a black cat crossing the road being bad luck, cutting fingernails/toenails at nighttime is considered to give bad luck, a crow calling meaning that guests are arriving, drinking milk after eating fish causing skin diseases, and itchy palms signaling the arrival of money.

== Overview ==
Superstitions are usually attributed to lack of education; however, this has not always been the case in India, as there are many educated people with beliefs considered superstitious by the public. Superstitious beliefs and practices vary from one region to another, ranging from harmless practices such as lemon-and-chili to terms in order to ward off the evil eye, to harmful acts like witch-burning.

Being part of tradition and religion, these beliefs and practices have been passed down from one generation to another for centuries. The Indian government has tried to put new laws prohibiting such practices into effect. Due to the rich history of superstition, these laws often face a lot of opposition from the general public. In 2013, Narendra Dabholkar, an anti-superstition specialist, who was also the founder of the Committee for the Eradication of Blind Faith, was fatally shot by two bikers for requesting the enactment of a law that prohibits black magic. Critics argued that the Indian constitution does not prohibit such acts.

== Past ==
=== Sati ===
Sati is the act or custom of a Hindu widow burning herself or being burned to death on the funeral pyre of her husband. After watching the Sati of his own sister-in-law, Ram Mohan Roy began campaigning for abolition of the practice in 1811. The practice of Sati was abolished by Governor General Lord William Bentinck in British India in 1829.

On 4 September 1987, 18-year-old Roop Kanwar, from Deorala, Rajasthan, who had been married for 7 months, was burned to death on her husband's pyre. It was alleged the victim had tried to escape, but she was drugged and forced on to the pyre. On 1 October 1987, the legislative assembly of Rajasthan passed an ordinance against Sati, which was later turned into an Act. It was followed by pro-Sati rallies and protests in Jaipur. On 3 January 1988, the Indian parliament passed a new law (Commission (Prevention) of Sati Act 1987) based on Rajasthan's legislation of 1987, which also criminalized the glorification of Sati. Police charged Kanwar's father-in-law and brother-in-law of allegedly forcing her to commit the act, but they were acquitted in October 1996.

=== Human sacrifice ===
Although human sacrifices are not prevalent in India, rare isolated incidents do happen, especially in rural areas. In some cases, humans have been replaced by animals and birds. This has caused backlash from animal rights groups, so in some places they have again been replaced by human effigies. The motives behind these sacrifices include inducing rainfall and helping childless women conceive. It is alleged that cases often go unreported or are covered up. Between 1999 and 2006, about 200 cases of child sacrifices were reported from Uttar Pradesh.

== Prevalent ==
=== Auspicious days ===
In Hinduism, people are believed to have auspicious or favourable days on which they will have a high probability of success in any task they do. Such days with a certain time are calculated based on the individual's birth star, moon, and planetary phases according to Hindu astrology. Starting a business or businesses signing new deals or starting new ventures is mostly conducted on auspicious days of persons involved in the business. Hindu marriages are also done in a matching auspicious time and date of a bride and groom according to Hindu astrology and horoscope of the bride and groom.

=== Fortune telling ===
Fortune telling is a common practice in India. Fortune tellers have a variety of ways of predicting the future like palmistry, consulting horoscope, numerology, parrot astrology, boom boom mattukaran etc.

=== Godmen and faith healers ===
The word godman in modern usage is a colloquial blanket term used for charismatic spiritual leaders in India. Locally, they may be referred to as baba, swami, guru, shastri, bapu or bhagat. Many of them claim to have magic or psychic powers and perform miracles. On the other hand, some only provide spiritual advice. There are also female gurus. Many of them are worshiped by their followers as avatars or living gods. Many of them belong to ancient ascetic lineages or claim to be successor to some previous spiritual predecessor. Some of them have built large pan-Indian or international networks. Their recent success has been attributed to the use of mass media and public relations techniques.

=== Horoscopes ===
In India, people who follow Hindu religion believe to be born with a star on their name which is one of twenty seven stars in Hindu astrology based on their time and date of birth. They also believe that planets and their position and size and shape of moon such a full moon or full solar eclipse influence their day-to-day life. Horoscopes are tailored to each and every Hindu person and a horoscope typically mentions any defects or negative influences a person has or may face. Horoscope is used in marriages in which the bride and groom should have a matching horoscope which is also called Janam Kundali. Without a matching horoscope, a marriage between Hindu male and female may not happen. Hindu wedding matchmakers typically carry information about a person's horoscope. Hindu persons prefer arranged marriage as it allows them to find a bride or groom with a matching horoscope.

A person born under the influence of Mars (Mangala) is said to have Mangala Dosha ("mars defect"); such a person is called a manglik. According to the superstition, the marriage between a Manglik and a non-Manglik is disastrous. To prevent this disaster, the manglik person is first married to a tree, an animal, or an inanimate object, so that the purported evil effects of the mangala dosha befall on the mock "spouse".

=== Lemons ===
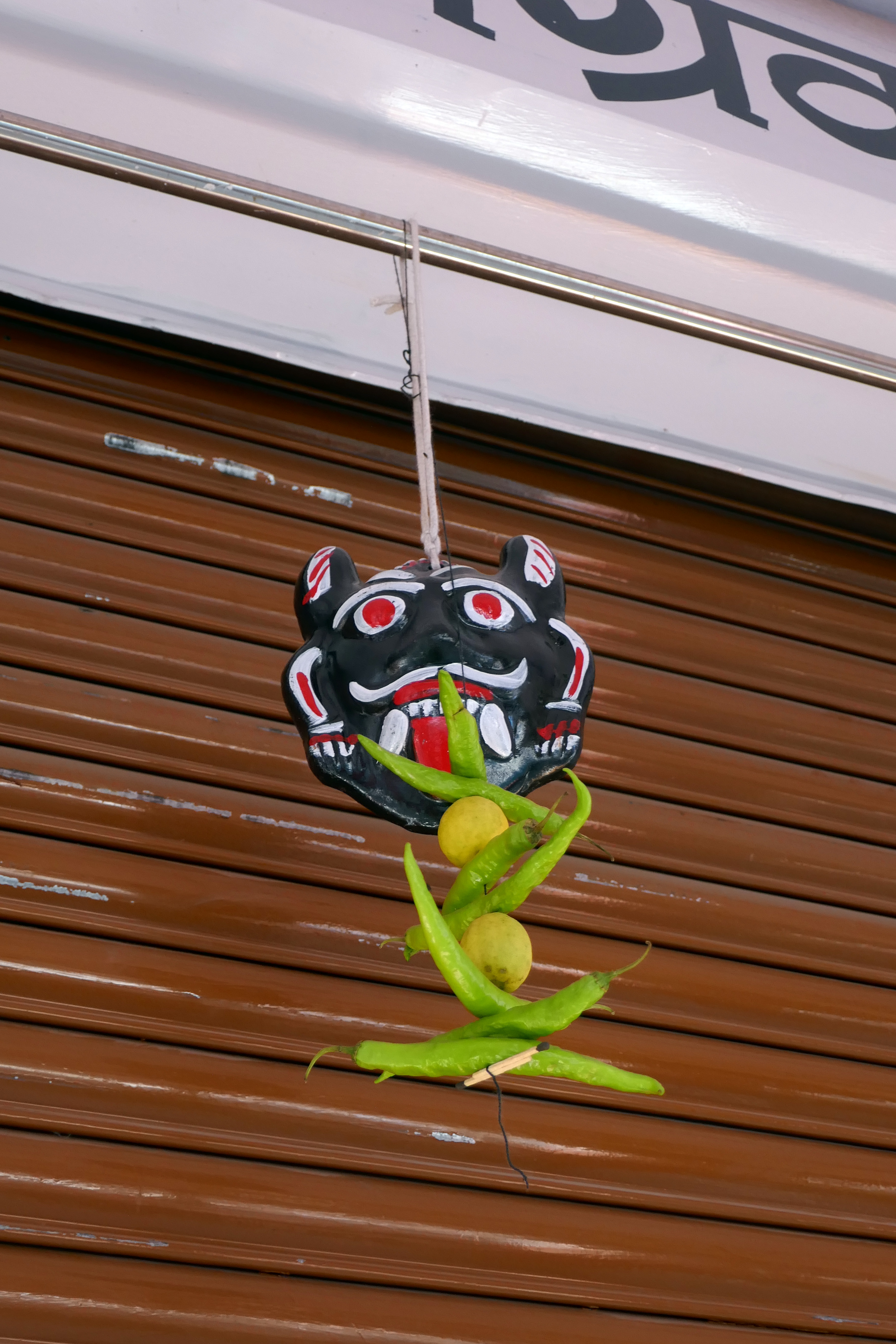
A nimbu mirchi totka hung at a shop's entrance.

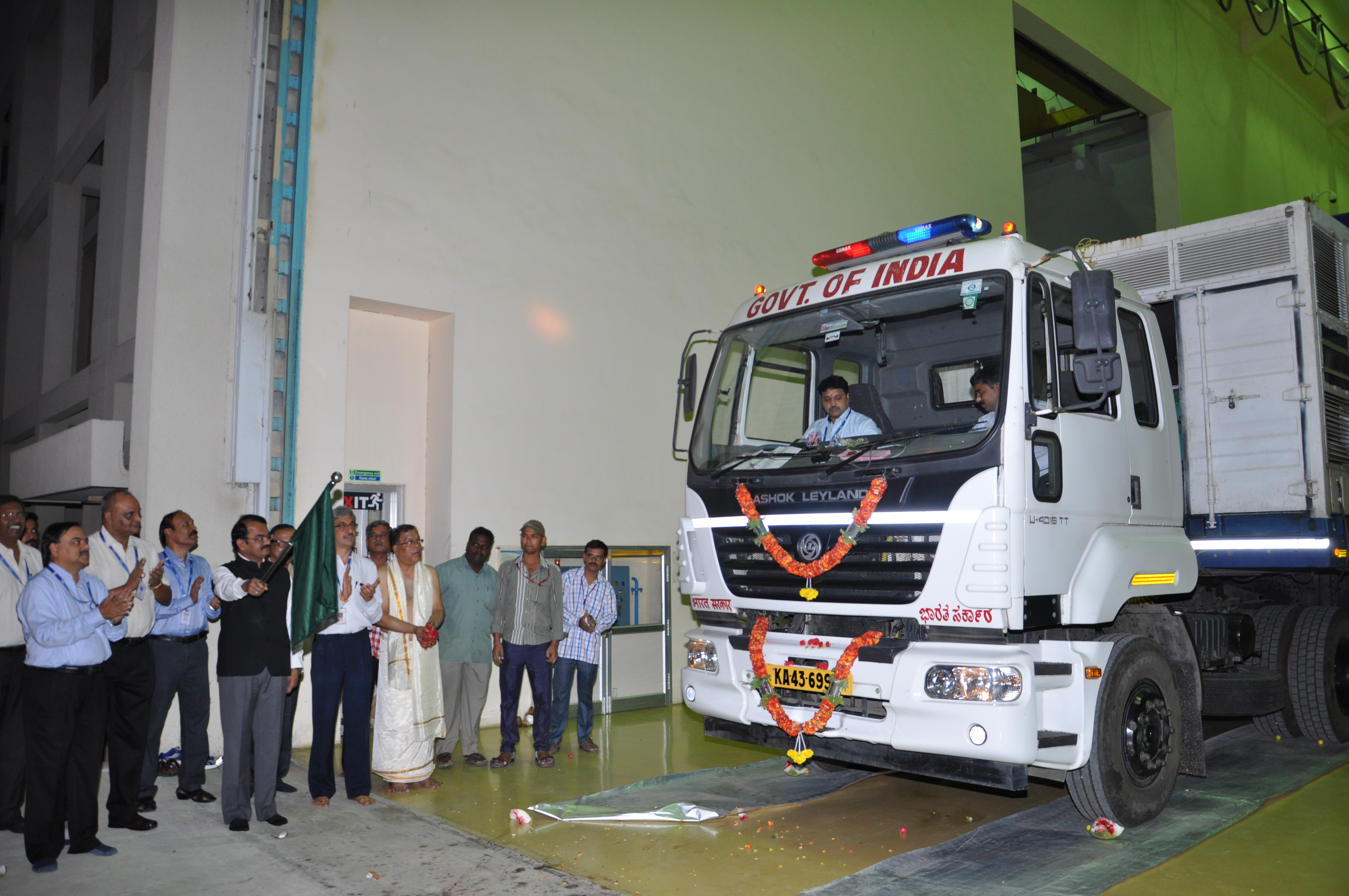
To ward off evil lemons placed under wheels of vehicle used to deliver spacecraft.

Lemons are generally considered as a counter weapon to a "mantra" which is a spell that can be also used for trickery or evil. Some Hindu people also carry lemons while travelling so that they cannot fall under the spell of a "mantra" of a stranger.

According to the nimbu totka or nimbu mirchi totka superstition, hanging a lemon strung with seven chili peppers wards off evil spirits and Alakshmi, the Hindu goddess of misfortune. People hang lemons and chillies - sometimes with a piece of coal - outside their homes and shops, or in their vehicles. According to one explanation, the superstition may be based on the belief that beneficial Vitamin C from the lemon and the chillies is released into the air, and that their odor can repel insects and other pests.

Stepping on a lemon is also considered to cause harm to a person as the lemon may be enchanted with a "mantra" or a dark spell. Lemons and coconuts are used in Hindu rituals called pooja. Government of India frequently performs Hindu rituals on vehicles, computer and electronic equipment, airplanes, jetplanes and weapons. Breaking a coconut in such pooja is also common. Hindus do Shastra pooja which is goddess worship is performed on weapons.

=== Solar and lunar eclipses ===
There are several superstitions associated with solar eclipses. Solar eclipses are associated with war, violent events and disasters. Any cooked food is considered to have become impure during the event; they are thrown away or given to beggars. People don't eat or cook food during the event. Temples are closed before the event and reopened after the event is over. Many shops also remain closed. Pregnant women are advised to stay indoors. It is considered inauspicious to give birth during the event. Solar eclipse are also said to cause miscarriages Other people also avoid venturing outside. It is believed that the sun rays become toxic during the event and a bath must be taken after the event. Indian stock exchanges also observe a drop in trades during eclipses. There are some reports of disabled children being buried neck-deep in sand or mud in hopes of curing their disabilities. Similar beliefs exist around lunar eclipses, where food is avoided and people refrain from venturing outside. Rationalist organisations have been trying to eradicate these superstitions by organising events during eclipses, where people are encouraged to drink water and eat food.

=== Vastu ===
This is a superstition common in Hinduism which defines how a house or a building should be constructed and how the orientation and direction and location of rooms and doors should be arranged. Many construction companies in India construct buildings according to it. Hindus follow vastu and they believe that bad things happen in their life or deterioration of their health or disputes with others are due to vastu doshas or defects and they try hard to remedy those defects by altering living space or with other things which counter the effects of vastu. Vastu is similar to Feng shui in China but with more psychological implications for not following vastu correctly.

==== Notable persons and incidents ====
- Originally from Sri Lanka, Swami Premananda moved to India in 1984 and founded an ashram in Pudukkotai, Tamil Nadu, in 1989. In 1996, one of the girls living the ashram escaped and reported that she was raped and was pregnant. In view of the so-called spiritual powers of the accused, which included doing miracles like materializing vibhuti and regurgitating small Shiva lingams, an illusionist was invited to the court and he performed both the miracles in the open court. In 1997, the Swami was sentenced to life imprisonment and fined ₹60 lakh for 13 counts of rape and a murder.
- Chandraswami, astrologer and spiritual guru, was a close associate of former Prime Minister Narasimha Rao. He was indicted in several lawsuits including in the assassination of Prime Minister Rajiv Gandhi. In 2011, the Supreme Court of India fined him ₹9 crore (US$1.4 million) for multiple violations of the Foreign Exchange Regulation Act (FERA).
- In December 2002, Santosh Madhavan defrauded an Indian expatriate woman living in Dubai of DH 400,000 (₹50 lakh) by claiming he had supernatural powers, and disappeared. The Interpol issued an alert for his arrest on the advice of Dubai police. Later in 2008, his photograph was recognized by the woman in a magazine and she realized that the person was living in Kochin pretending to be a godman called Swami Amritha Chaitanya. On learning of the Interpol alert, he denied the allegations, but the local police were suspicious and decided to search his properties. The police discovered CDs containing child porn from the premises. He was convicted of raping under-aged children and sentenced to 16 years of imprisonment in May 2009.
- In August 2002, when psychic surgeon Reverend Alex Orbito visited Bangalore from Philippines, some rationalists filed a case in the city court. The city court declared psychic surgery to be a trick and ordered the organizers to stop the event. The organizers ignored the order and decided to go ahead. The court ordered arrests for contempt of court but Alex Orbito evaded arrest and escaped from the country. Bangalore police has stated that there are no plans to extradite him but he will be arrested if he tries to return to Bangalore.
- In September 2013, when the large and influential guru Asaram Bapu was acquitted for the rape of one of his devotees living at his ashram, his blindly trusting devotees learned about the true nature and practices at the ashram. In his ashrams, there were many types of abuses occurring in the name of being a true devotee. Underage girls were sexually abused. After being caught, he was sentenced to life.
- Chintaharan Chauhan, an Indian man, dressed as a bride for 30 years in order to ward off illness and death from his family. He claimed that several people from his family started dying after his wife committed suicide when he left her. He thought that his wife's death was the reason behind the deaths in his family; therefore, he decided to dress as a bride in order to keep his wife alive within him, and stop the continuous series of deaths.

==== Criticism ====
Sanal Edamaruku, president of the Indian Rationalist Association, has criticized TV channels for broadcasting shows featuring godmen. Narendra Nayak, president of Federation of Indian Rationalist Associations, has stated that politicians patronizing godmen serves to sanction superstitions of the general public. Nayak has also debunked several so-called miracles of godmen like psychic surgery, materializing vibhuti, money, jewelry, and fire eating. He travels through villages demonstrating the tricks behind these miracles.

=== Witch-hunts ===
Some people, mostly in villages, have the belief that witchcraft and black magic (kala-jaadu) are effective. This prompts some to seek advice from witch doctors for health, financial or marital problems. Unfortunately, others, especially women, are accused of witchcraft, attacked, and occasionally killed. According to reports, widows or divorcees tend to be targeted to rob them of their property. Revered village witch-doctors are paid to brand specific persons as witches, so that they can be killed without repercussions. The existing laws have been ineffective in curbing the murders. In June 2013, the National Commission for Women (NCW) reported that according to National Crime Records Bureau statistics, 768 women had been murdered for allegedly practicing witchcraft since 2008. Alongside this, they announced plans for newer, more stringent laws.

==== Recent cases ====
Between 2001 and 2006, an estimated 300 people were killed in the state of Assam. In October 2003, three women were branded as witches and humiliated, afterwards they all committed suicide in Kamalpura village in Muzaffarpur district in Bihar. Between 2005 and 2010, about 35 witchcraft related murders reportedly took place in Odisha's Sundergarh district. In August 2013, a couple were hacked to death by a group of people in Kokrajhar district in Assam. In September 2013, in the Jashpur district of Chhattisgarh, a woman was murdered and her daughter was raped on the allegation that they were practicing black magic.

== Incidents ==
=== 1995 Hindu milk miracle ===
On 21 September 1995, a Ganesha idol in Delhi was reported to have drunk the milk offered to it. Soon, as the news spread, similar phenomenon were reported from all over India and a few from abroad. Other idols, like those of Nandi and Shiva, were also reported drinking milk. The price of milk soared due to shortage and policemen had to be placed at temples to maintain order. Yash Pal, scientist and educator, called it an illusion. National Council for Science & Technology Communication (NCSTC) scientists demonstrated that it was caused by capillary action by mixing red dye with the milk.

=== 2012 Sanal Edamaruku and the Jesus statue incident ===
On 10 March 2012, Sanal Edamaruku investigated a so-called miracle in Vile Parle, where a Jesus statue had started weeping and concluded that the problem was caused by faulty drainage. Later that day, during a TV discussion with some church members, Edamaruku accused the Catholic Church of miracle-mongering. On 10 April, Angelo Fernandes, President of the Maharashtra Christian Youth Forum, filed a police complaint against Edamaruku under Indian Penal Code Section 295A. In July, while on a tour in Finland, Edamaruku was informed by a friend that his house was visited by the police. Since the offence is not bailable, Edamaruku decided to stay in Finland.

== Historical predictions and challenges ==
=== Historical predictions ===
- In September 1951, responding to a newspaper article about an astrologer predicting an imminent war with Pakistan, the first Prime Minister of India, Jawaharlal Nehru expressed his desire to pass a law against astrology and sooth-saying.
- In January 1962, Indian astrologers predicted a global catastrophe on Sunday, 4 February 1962. People took refuge in hills to escape the event. The Maharajah of Sikkim, Palden Thondup Namgyal postponed his marriage to Hope Cooke to 1963 on the advice of some astrologers. Business and travel also slowed down. People organised mass prayer meetings. Prime Minister Jawaharlal Nehru called it a "matter for laughter".
- In January 1981, several astrologers predicted 12 more months of Iran–Iraq War, an Indian general election in 1983 and a world war in March 1984. A doomsday prediction was also made by an astrologer for 1995, when 70–80 percent of the world population would be destroyed.
- In June 1981, an astrologer made the prediction that Indira Gandhi, then Prime Minister of India, would be assassinated in September 1981. Her son Rajiv Gandhi would also be assassinated shortly afterwards. Then, following these events H. N. Bahuguna would become the Prime Minister. The astrologer was arrested in December for questioning. Indira Gandhi reportedly consulted astrologers herself.
- In October 2004, several Indian astrologers predicted that John Kerry would win the 2004 US presidential election. They also predicted it would "rejuvenate" the United States, and bring peace in Iraq, the Middle East and Afghanistan.
- In January 2012, several astrologers predicted that there will be no doomsday in 2012 and it will be a good year for India and the Indian economy.

=== Challenges and empirical tests ===
- Before the general election in 2009, rationalist activist Narendra Nayak laid an open challenge to any soothsayer to answer 25 questions correctly about the forthcoming elections. The prize was set at ₹100,000 (about US$2,000). About 450 responses were mailed to him, but none were found to be correct.
- The notable rationalist Prabir Ghosh has offered a prize of ₹5 million (US$ 78,600 approx) to anyone who can prove something unnatural or demonstrate supernatural powers of any kind without resorting to any tricks.

== Reception ==
=== Criticism ===
U. R. Rao, former chairman of Indian Space Research Organisation, has criticised astrology noting that astrology is more popular than astronomy, which may be affecting India's recognition in science. Meera Nanda, historian and author, has written that India cannot become a superpower in science, unless it eradicates its various superstitions including astrology. Others who have criticised astrology include, Jayant Narlikar (astrophysicist),P. M Bhargava (founder of Centre for Cellular and Molecular Biology), Ram Puniyani (former IIT professor) and Yash Pal (physicist and educator).

=== Defence ===
Ashis Nandy, political psychologist, has argued that astrology should be considered a science and it is considered superstition only due to modern science being defined from a western viewpoint.

== Surveys ==
=== Worldviews and Opinions of Scientists in India (2007) ===
In 2007, a survey was conducted by the Institute for the Study of Secularism in Society and Culture of the Trinity College with the help of Center for Inquiry (India) called "Worldviews and Opinions of Scientists in India". 1100 scientists surveyed from 130 institutes. 24% admitted to believing that holy-men can perform miracles and 38% believed that God could perform miracles. Whereas belief in faith healing was 16%, in Vaastu it was 14%, and in astrology it stood at 14%. 69% strongly approved introduction of astrology courses in universities. 67% strongly approved the tradition of seeking blessings of Tirupati before rocket launches. However, a majority of them agreed that the aim of development of scientific temper, which is a fundamental duty according to the Constitution's Article 51A (h), is not being fulfilled. Y. S. Rajan commented on this saying that most Indians don't feel there is a dichotomy between science and spirituality. Other the hand, Innaiah Narisetti, chairman of Center for Inquiry (India) and Pushpa Bhargava, the former director of the Centre for Cellular and Molecular Biology, pointed out the lack of scientific temper among Indian scientists.

=== Superstitions at Workplace (2012) ===
In a survey, titled "Superstitons@Workplace", carried out by a staffing company called TeamLease in 2012. The survey covered 800 companies in 8 cities of which 61% of respondents admitted to having superstition and 51% admitted to following a superstition at their workplace and 48% believed that these practices had a positive effect on their productivity. It was noted that management didn't object to the practices as long as it didn't affect productivity. Most practices were related to Vaastu Shastra or Feng Shui, but other personal practices were also observed. 80% of female employees were comfortable with the practices being followed in their workplace, while it was 68% for males, and 63% admitted thinking that female employees are more superstitious.

== Legal aspects ==
=== Article 51 A (h), Constitution of India ===
The Article 51 A (h) of the Constitution of India, lists "to develop the scientific temper, humanism and the spirit of inquiry and reform" as a fundamental duty for every Indian citizen. Rationalist Narendra Nayak has argued the Article 51 A (h) is contrary to IPC 295A and the constitution should be held over to IPC 295A. There have been calls to implement this article more widely (e.g., 2011 Janhit Manch vs Union of India, Bombay High Court).

=== Drugs and Magic Remedies (Objectionable Advertisements) Act, 1954 ===
This act prohibits advertisements of magical remedies, like amulets or spells, for certain diseases. The law lists 56 of these diseases. The law also curbs sales and promotion of so-called miracle drugs and cures. But, the law is rarely enforced and several such products are freely available to the public. The law is considered severely outdated as 14 of the diseases in the list are now curable, and newer diseases like AIDS are not on the list. Some advertisements of these categories are also known to appear on cable television channels without much repercussions. Proposed amendments to this law has also raised questions regarding the status of traditional medicine systems like Yoga and Ayurveda with respect to modern medicine.

=== Indian Penal Code, Section 295A ===
The Section 295A of the Indian Penal Code criminalises "deliberate and malicious acts intended to outrage religious feelings of any class by insulting its religion or religious beliefs", it includes "words, either spoken or written, or by signs or by visible representations". The offence holds a maximum penalty of three years of prison. It has been argued that this law is unconstitutional under Article 19 (freedom of expression) in the past (e.g., 1957 Ramji Lal Modi vs State of Uttar Pradesh, Supreme Court). It has also been stated by rationalist Narendra Nayak and T. V. Venkateswaran of the Vigyan Prasar that IPC 295A is being used with a very wide definition to prosecute critics of religion, anti-superstition activists and rationalists.

=== Regional laws ===
The Prevention of Witch (Daain) Practices Act of 1999 outlaws witch-hunting in Bihar. It has also been adopted by the state of Jharkhand. It carries a sentence of 3 months for accusing a woman of being a witch and 6 months for causing any physical or mental harm. In 2005, Chhattisgarh passed the Tonahi Pratadna Nivaran Act. It holds a sentence of 3 years for accusing a woman of being a witch and 5 years for causing her physical harm. The upcoming Women (Prevention of Atrocities) Bill of 2012 in Rajasthan also covers witch-hunting. In December 2013, Odisha passed the Odisha Prevention of Witch-Hunting Bill which has a maximum penalty of seven years. Also in the same month, the Anti-Superstition and Black Magic Act was passed in Maharashtra.

== Lawsuits ==
=== 2001 P. M. Bhargava vs UGC, Andhra High Court ===
In 2001, following the UGC announcement of introducing astrology courses in universities, P.M. Bhargava, founder of Centre for Cellular and Molecular Biology and others, filed a petition in the Andhra Pradesh High Court against UGC. The court dismissed the case on 27 April 2001, stating that it has no expertise in the subject and thus it cannot interfere unless UGC has clearly violated a law.

=== 2004 P. M. Bhargava vs UGC, Supreme Court ===
In 2004, P.M. Bhargava and two other petitioners, filed a Special Leave Petition (SLP) in the Supreme Court of India challenging the UGC decision to introduce astrology in universities. It argued that astrology is considered a pseudoscience, several members of the Indian scientific community have opposed the move, and it would undermine India's scientific credibility. The Government of India responded by stating that the course was not compulsory, but optional and several western universities allow astrology as a course choice. It sought dismissal of the case stating that the petitioners' concerns were unfounded. The Supreme Court dismissed the case on 5 May 2004.

=== 2011 Janhit Manch vs Union of India, Bombay High Court ===
In 2010, Janhit Manch, a non-profit organisation, filed a Public Interest Litigation (PIL) in the Bombay High Court seeking legislation to make teaching of scientific temper in schools compulsory, under Article 51 A (h) of the Constitution using Article 226, which defines the powers of the High Courts. It also requested that a disclaimer be added to advertisements about astrology, Vaastu Shastra, Feng Shui, tarot cards etc., under The Drugs and Magical Remedies (Objectionable Advertisements) Act, 1954, stating that these are for entertainment only. On 3 February 2011, the Bombay High Court disposed the plea citing the 2004 Bhargava vs UGC, Supreme Court case. It further stated that Article 51 A (h) was too vague to be implemented using Article 266.

== See also ==
- Anti-Superstition and Black Magic Act
- Religion in India
- Culture of India
- Maharashtra Andhashraddha Nirmoolan Samiti
