= Santosh Madhavan =

Indian religious leader (1960–2024)

- Madhavan, c. 2009
- Born: 7 June 1960; Kattappana, Idukki, India
- Died: 6 March 2024 (aged 63); Kochi, Kerala, India
- Other name: Amritha Chaithanya
- Occupations: Godman, Rapist, Child Molester, Conman
- Spouse: Swapna Madhavan (m. 2007)

Santosh Madhavan (7 June 1960 – 6 March 2024), also known as Amritha Chaithanya, was an Indian godman.

== Early life and career ==
Santosh Madhavan was born on 7 June 1960 in Irupathekar at Kattappana, Idukki from a poor family. His father P. K. Madhavan was a Porter and his mother, Thankamma was a Housewife. He had completed his primary education in St. Antony's School in Vallakadavu and Government High School in Kattappana. He failed in 10th grade and lefts home after he works as a salesman in a footwear shop in Kattappana then he moved to Kochi with his family after selling their house where he works as a attendant in a nearby temple in Kaloor and studies Astrology. Then he works as a Pujari in Thruthy Sree Bhagavathi Temple in Maradu, Thrippunithura which makes him to inspire it.

=== Return as Swami Amrita Chaitanya ===
After working as Pujari in a temple one day, Santosh Madhavan gets disappeared and the temple authorities couldn't know about any information of him. After 3 years, he returns in a role of swami growing his hair and changing his dress and his name as Swami Amrita Chaitanya and makes the people to believe he is no more to be a Pujari but he is an godman.

=== 2017–2024: Jail Released; Final years and death ===
In 2017, Santosh Madhavan had granted released from Poojapura jail due to his good behaviour and returns to Kochi after 7 years while after released from jail, Santosh had completely suffered from heart diseases and being living Isolated from public many years. He neither returned to his hometown since his release and being reclusive from everyone including from his family and he often goes outside from his apartment and goes to hospital to meet doctors. While after 4 years suffering from heart diseases on 1 March 2024, Santosh Madhavan gets critical from cardiac ailment and gets admitted on Medical Trust Hospital, in Ernakulam on Tuesday Midnight and on 6 March 2024, Santosh Madhavan died from heart disease, at the age of 63.

== Biography ==
Madhavan had been wanted by Interpol since 2004 for fraud committed in the United Arab Emirates. A Dubai-based Indian woman, Serafin Edwin, accused him of cheating her of 400,000 dirhams in 2002. He was arrested near Cochin on May 18, 2008, for fraud.

Madhavan was found guilty of pedophilia and producing pornography videos of him molesting underage girls at a children's home run by his trust, Santhitheeram. While in police custody, he complained of chest pain and was admitted to a hospital. In May 2009, he was sentenced to 16 years in prison for molesting two underage girls.
