= Narendra Nayak =

Indian activist (born 1951)

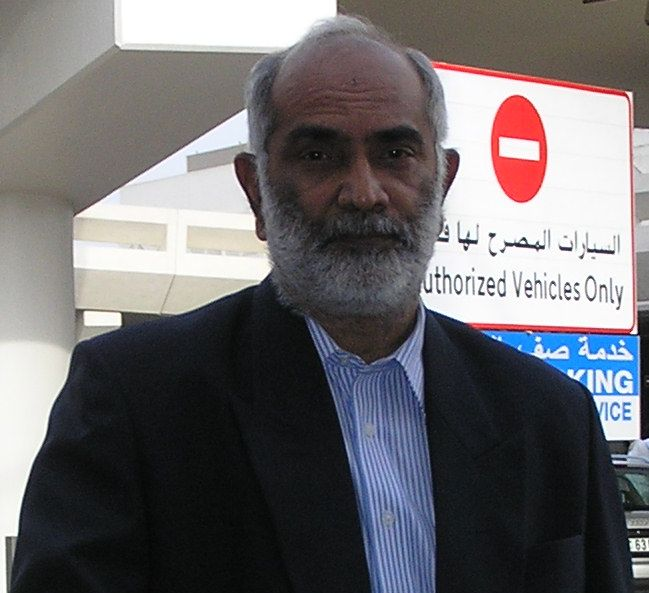
- Born: 5 February 1951 (age 75); Mangalore, Karnataka, India
- Occupations: Rationalist, sceptic, columnist and biochemistry professor
- Spouse: Asha Nayak

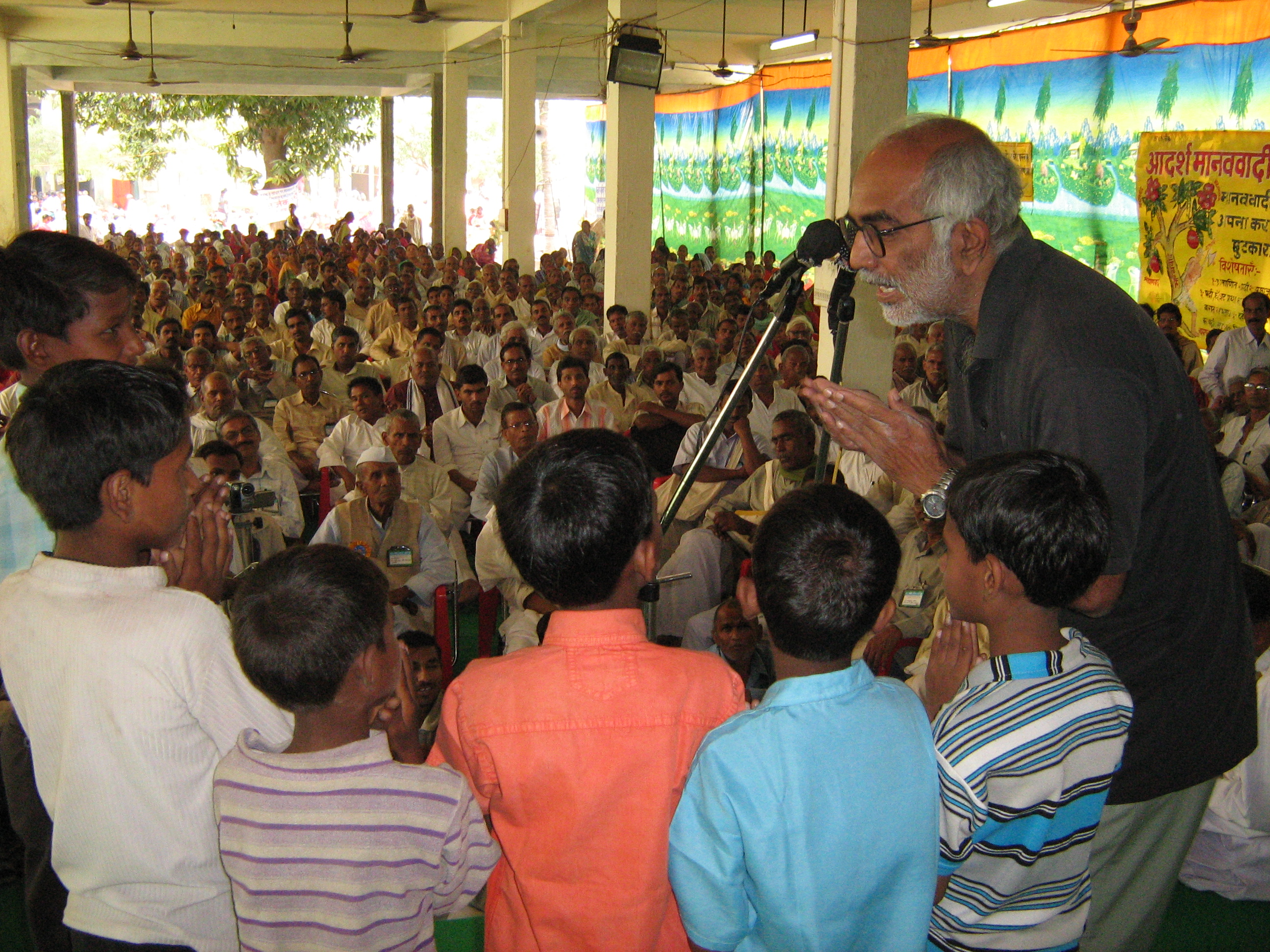
Nayak during a miracle-exposure program conducted at Ayodhya on 5 November 2007 during the First All India Conference of Arjak Sangh, an affiliate of FIRA

Narendra Nayak (born 5 February 1951) is a rationalist, sceptic, and godman debunker from Mangalore, Karnataka, India. Nayak is the current president of the Federation of Indian Rationalist Associations (FIRA). He founded the Dakshina Kannada Rationalist Association in 1976 and has been its secretary since then. He also founded an NGO called Aid Without Religion in July 2011.

He tours the country conducting workshops to promote scientific temper and showing people how to debunk godmen and frauds. He has conducted over 3500 such demonstrations in India, including some in Australia, Greece, England, Norway, Denmark, Sri Lanka and Nepal. He is also a polyglot who speaks 9 languages fluently, which helps him when he is giving talks in various parts of the country.

== Life and work ==
Nayak was named after Swami Vivekananda (born Narendra Nath Datta). He has stated that seeing his father's business premises being repossessed by the bank and his father buying a lottery ticket on the advice of an astrologer to pay off the loan with the total confidence that it would get the first prize made him turn to rationalism. He married Asha Nayak, a lawyer in Mangaluru in a non-religious ceremony. Nayak started out working as a lecturer in the Department of Biochemistry at the Kasturba Medical College in Mangalore in 1978. In 1982, he met Basava Premanand, a notable rationalist from Kerala, and was influenced by him.

In 2023, the Karnataka State Police withdrew his security, prompting Nayak to say that it was an "open invitation to forces" that want to finish him.

== Activism ==
Nayak decided to take on full-time anti-superstition activism in 2004 when he heard that a girl had been sacrificed in Gulbarga in Karnataka. He was an assistant professor of biochemistry when he took voluntary retirement on 25 November 2006, after working there for 28 years.

Before the general election in 2009, Nayak laid an open challenge to any soothsayer to answer 25 questions correctly about the forthcoming elections. The prize was set at ₹1,000,000 (about US$15,000). About 450 responses were mailed to him, but none were found to be correct. The Federation of Indian Rationalist Associations has been conducting such challenges since 1991. During May 2013 Karnataka state assembly election, disappointed at the challenge being one-sided, Nayak had decided against the idea of challenging astrologers this time. But when a Bengaluru-based astrologer Shankar Hegde made claims to predict the election results accurately, he received the challenge. Nayak offered to hand over a cheque of Rs.10 lakh (after deducting taxes as applicable under income Tax Act), if 19 out of the 20 results were proven right. However, later on astrologer Hegde did not turn up.

Through the organisation named Aid Without Religion which was registered in July 2011, he has been helping people and institutions where there are no religious rituals, superstitious practices, unscientific systems of medicine and such supernatural beliefs.

He has been featured on National Geographic's television show Is it real?. He has also appeared on the Discovery Channel. He has been a regular columnist at the newspaper Mangalore Today since its inception. He also serves on the editorial board of the Folks Magazine.

He claims to have been attacked for his activism a few times. He also has stated that his scooter's brake wires were once found severed, after an astrologer predicted his death or injury.

He was also involved in fighting against Midbrain activation, an alleged modern technique that enables students to see objects despite being blindfolded. In March 2017, there was an attempt on Narendra Nayak's life. During the early morning hours, while on his way to the Mangala swimming pool in his car, he was approached by two unidentified men in a bike wearing helmets and hinted that his tyres were punctured. Nayak suspected that this attempt on his life could possibly be the repercussions to his fight for the justice of the slain RTI activist Vinayak Baliga, who was murdered exactly a year previous to this episode.

Narendra presented at the first Global Congress on Scientific Thinking and Action which was held on March 17–20, 2021. During Session III on Alternative Medicine, he talked about the wide use of alternative medicines in India, including homeopathy. He states that the relatively low death rate from COVID in India has been falsely attributed to the use of homeopathic medicines as preventative. When asked what should be done about the use of alternative medicines in India, he said, flatly, “They should be banned.”

== Views ==
Nayak advocates that more people should be taught to perform the so-called miracles of godmen. He also advocates that people should be trained to recognize pseudoscience and demand scientific evidence. He holds the opinion that well-known scientists should be convinced to join the cause and form pressure groups against pseudoscience.

He is also lobbying for a bill for the separation of state and religion to be introduced in the Indian parliament. After the murder of anti-superstition activist Narendra Dabholkar and enactment of the anti-superstition ordinance in Maharashtra state, Nayak expressed the need of a similar law in Karnataka.

Regarding fellow Mangalorean George Fernandes, Nayak said the "You can hate George Fernandes, You can love Fernandes, but you cannot ignore him". Nayak was the guest of honour during the launch event of the book Bandh Samrat - Tales of Eternal Rebel written on George Fernandes's early trade union activities in Mangalore and Bombay

== Awards ==
- 2011 "Distinguished Service to Humanism Award" from the International Humanist and Ethical Union
- 2015 "Lawrence Pinto Human Rights Award" from the Friends of Lawry
- 2017 "Academy Honorary Award" Karnataka Balavikas Academy, Directorate of Women and Child Development Department, Government of Karnataka

== See also ==
- Superstition in India
- Federation of Indian Rationalist Associations
- James Randi and his One Million Dollar Paranormal Challenge
- Basava Premanand
- Prabir Ghosh
- Narendra Dabholkar
