= Prabir Ghosh =

Indian science writer (1945–2023)

- প্রবীর ঘোষ
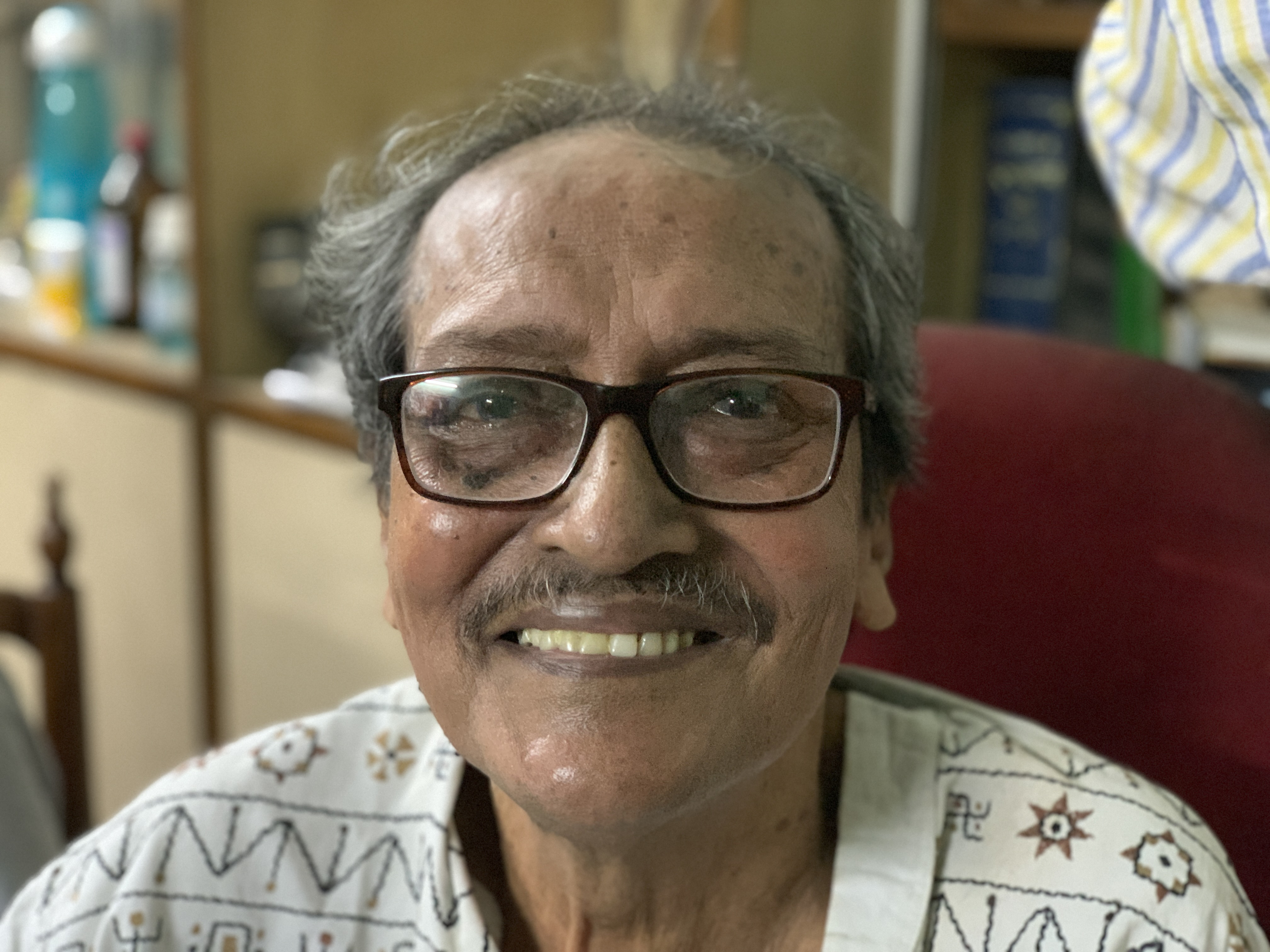
- Ghosh in 2019
- Born: 1 March 1945; Faridpur, Bengal Province, British India
- Died: 7 April 2023 (aged 78); Dum Dum, Kolkata, West Bengal, India
- Occupations: Social activist, author
- Partner: Sima Ghosh
- Children: Pinaki Ghosh

Prabir Ghosh (1 March 1945 – 7 April 2023) was the founder and president of Bharatiya Bigyan O Yuktibadi Samiti, a science and rationalists' association based in Kolkata, India. He was the author of a number of books in Bengali disputing supernatural claims and was well known for his book series titled Aloukik Noy, Loukik.

== Early life and family ==
Prabir Ghosh was born in 1945 at the Faridpur (Now in Bangladesh). His parents were Mr. Prabhat Chandra Ghosh and Smt. Suhasini Ghosh. His father moved to Adra, Purulia when he was six months old. He spent his early childhood in Adra. Young Prabir came to railway town Kharagpur in 1955. He completed his secondary education from Kharagpur. Later his father settled in Dum Dum, Kolkata, in 1960. Ghosh completed graduation from Dum Dum Motijheel College. He used to imitate the street magicians in those days. On 1 March 1985, Ghosh along with other Kolkata based Bengali rationalists founded the Bharatiya Bigyan O Yuktibadi Samiti. He organised a long-term campaign against people with so-called supernatural powers. Once he got involved in a controversy over his psychology degree. In 1999, Prabir Ghosh quit his job of State Bank of India.

== Death ==
Ghosh died at his home in Dum Dum on 7 April 2023, at the age of 78.

== ₹5,000,000 miracle challenge ==
Similar to James Randi's One Million Dollar Paranormal Challenge, Ghosh offered a prize of ₹5 million (US$ 78,600 approx) to anyone who can demonstrate supernatural power of any kind without resorting to any trick, although he admitted that he personally does not possess such an amount of money.

== Major works ==
- Aloukik Noy, Loukik (in Bengali) (English title: "Natural, not Supernatural" in five volumes)'
- Uncovering Mother Teresa's miracle power.

== Bibliography ==
=== Books in Bengali ===
- Sanskriti: songhorso o nirman (1994)
- Aloukik noi loukik (1 to 5 vol)
- Rajnititr management o aro kichu (2008)
- Kasmire ajadir lorai ekti itihasik dalil (2010)
- Yuktibadir chokhe gita ramayan mahavarat (2016)
- Prabad sanskar o kusanskar: (1999)
- Prem bibaho o onnyanya: (2017)
- Piknaki o Olukik Rohosya samagra (2015)
- Alukik Rohosya Sondhane Pinki: (2015)
- Aparadh Bigyan (2017)
- Memory man o moblibe baba (2008)
- Baree barre ghure firre tumi
- Amar chelebela (Early days biography of Prabir Ghosh)
- Juoboner Bojronirghos (Biogryphy ) (2013)
- Yuktibadir Challengerrra (Part-1 and 2)
- Goltablee saf Jabab
- Sommohoner A to Z
- Gerila juddher A to Z theke Azadi
- Moner Niyantran Yog o meditation
- Jotisher koffine ses perek
- Ami keno Isware Biswas korina
- Yuktibadir chokhe nari mukti
- Dhormo seba o sommohon
- Prosonya santras ebong
- Alukik rohoyajale pinki
- Alukik Dhristi Rohosya

=== Books in English ===
- Paranormal Exposed!
- The Mystery of Mother Teresa and Sainthood
- Why I Do Not Believe in God

== See also ==
- Federation of Indian Rationalist Associations
- Maharashtra Rationalist Association
- The One Million Dollar Paranormal Challenge
- List of prizes for evidence of the paranormal
- Narendra Nayak
- Basava Premanand
