= Tarksheel Society =

Indian rationalist organisation

Tarksheel Society Punjab (Rationalist Society) is a rationalist group based in Punjab, India.

== The beginning ==
Founded in 1984 under the leadership of Megh Raj Mitter & Sarjit Talwar. Tarksheel Society aims to disseminate rationalist ideas and scientific temper among the Indian people in order to eradicate religious fanaticism, communalism, caste system, untouchability and superstitions. Affiliated to Federation of Indian Rationalist Associations, Tarksheel Society advocates the separation of religion and education. The society has units in almost all the villages and towns of Punjab.

Though mainly confined to the state of Punjab, the Society now operates in the neighboring states of Haryana, Himachal Pradesh, Rajasthan, Delhi, Chhattisgarh, Uttar Pradesh, Madhya Pradesh and Jammu and Kashmir also. Due to its high South-Asian population, the Society is also active in three major cities in Canada: Vancouver, Calgary and Toronto.

== Campaigns ==
To accomplish its mission, the society organizes public meetings, conferences, study camps, seminars and publishes rationalist literature. The society undertakes campaigns to expose the so-called miracles and charlatanry of godmen who claim supernatural powers. Towards this the Society has announced a cash award of rupees five lakh (US$8,000) for anybody who demonstrates supernatural powers or miracles under fraud-proof conditions. The Society has so far published about 50 books in Punjabi and Hindi on rationalism and science to inculcate scientific temper among people.

In 2004 Tarksheel organized the three-day national conference for Federation of Indian Rationalist Associations.

== Periodicals ==
First book of the society was 'Te Dev Pursh Har Gaye' original author Dr. T. Kapoor was translated in Punjabi by Sarjit Talwar & Meghraj Mitter. The society publishes its own journals in Punjabi and Hindi. Tarak Bodh (Logical Cognition) and Taraksheel (Rationalist) are brought out in Punjabi and Tarak Jyoti (Logical Enlightenment) in Hindi.
