= Federation of Indian Rationalist Associations =

Indian organization

- Formation: 1997; 29 years ago
- Type: Nonprofit organisation
- Purpose: To work for implementation of Art. 51AH of Indian Constitution and for its fundamental rights except Art. (30)
- Region served: India
- Founder: Basava Premanand
- Website: fira.org.in

The Federation of Indian Rationalist Associations (FIRA) is an umbrella body of 83 (as of 2012) rationalist, atheist, skeptic, secularist and scientist organisations in India.

As an apex body of rationalist organisations, it is committed to the development of scientific temper and humanism in India, involved in promoting tolerance, critical thinking, women's rights, secularization, and freedom of expression, and fighting against the caste system and violence (especially towards Dalit population), superstition, pseudoscience, and child marriage.

== History ==
Basava Premanand, founder-convener of FIRA

The Federation of Indian Rationalist Associations was launched on 7 February 1997 following the 10th Kerala State Conference of Kerala Yukthivadi Sangham. The stated purpose of the organization is to coordinate the activities of the member organizations at the national level.

Basava Premanand is the founder of the FIRA who died on 4 October 2009. Shortly before his death, Premanand put out a statement declaring his commitment to rationalism to prevent false rumors that he had turned to god on his deathbed.

In 2004, Premanand put forth a proposal for Narendra Nayak to become president of FIRA at a general body meeting held at Bhatinda, Punjab. It was unanimously accepted. Premanand and Nayak met in 1980 or 1981 when Nayak was the secretary of Dakshina Kannada Rationalist Association. U. Kalanathan of Kerala Yukthivadi Sangham is the current General Secretary of the organization. FIRA has grown from about 50 organizations in 2005 to 83 organizations in 2012.

== Affiliation to IHEU ==
FIRA is affiliated to International Humanist and Ethical Union and supports minimum statement on Humanism (as required by IHEU bylaw 5.1) and the Amsterdam Declaration 2002.

=== Minimum statement ===
"Humanism is a democratic and ethical life stance, which affirms that human beings have the right and responsibility to give meaning and shape to their own lives. It stands for the building of a more humane society through an ethic based on human and other natural values in the spirit of reason and free inquiry through human capabilities. It is not theistic, and it does not accept supernatural views of reality."

== FIRA member organisations ==
Name	Based in	Founded	Notes
Akhil Bhartiya Anddashraddha Nirmoolan Samiti	Nagpur, Maharashtra	1982	National organisation
AMOFOI (Anti-caste Marriage & One-child Family Organization of India)	Bhubaneswar, Odisha	1980	Founding unit since 1997
Ananthapur Rationalist Association	Anantapur, Andhra Pradesh		
Andhra Pradesh Rationalist Association	Khammam, Andhra Pradesh		
ARIVU	Bellary, Karnataka		
Arjak Sangh	Faizabad, Uttar Pradesh		
Atheist Centre	Vijayawada, Andhra Pradesh	1940	
Atheist Society of India	Visakhapatnam, Andhra Pradesh	13 February 1972	
AT Kovoor Memorial Trust	Kozhikode, Kerala		
Bihar Buddhiwadi Samaj	Patna, Bihar	1985	
Bombay-Gujarat Rationalist Association	Ankleshwar, Gujarat		
Dakshina Kannada Rationalist Association	Mangalore, Karnataka	1976	
Democratic Action Forum of Dalits, Women and Minorities	Kolkata, West Bengal		
Ekasila Activity and Education Society	Itarsi/Hoshangabad, Madhya Pradesh		
Federation of Karnataka Rationalist Associations	Karnataka		State umbrella
Freethinkers Forum	Bangalore, Karnataka		
Goa Science Forum	Goa		
Hyderabad Rationalist Forum	Hyderabad, Andhra Pradesh		
Indian Committee for the Scientific Investigation of Paranormal	Podanur, Tamil Nadu	19??	
Jana Vijnana Vedika	Vijayawada, Andhra Pradesh		
Karnataka Federation of Rationalist Associations	Karnataka		State umbrella
Kerala Yukthivadi Sangham	Kerala	1935	
Maharashtra Andhashraddha Nirmoolan Samiti (MANS)	Pune, Maharashtra	1989	Maharashtra state branch
Manava Vikasa Vedika	Hyderabad, Andhra Pradesh		
Manavatavadi Vishwa Sansthan	Rajghat, Kurukshetra, Haryana		
Mandya Science Forum	Mandya, Karnataka		
Orissa Rationalist Association	Odisha		
Periyar Rationalists Forum	Thiruvananthapuram, Kerala		
Rationalists' Forum	Tamil Nadu		
Rationalist Society	Haryana		
Sunday Sapiens	Mumbai	2018	Founding activities since 2012
Satya Shodhak Sabha	Surat, Gujarat		
Science and Rationalists' Association of India	Kolkata, West Bengal	1985	
Science for Society	Jharkhand	2010	
Science for Society	Bihar	2010	
Science Trust	Kozhikode, Kerala		
Soshit Samaj	Jharkhand		
Tarksheel Society	Punjab	1984	
TRUST	Bhubaneswar		
Vicharavadi Sangham	Bangalore, Karnataka		

== National conferences ==
FIRA has so far convened twelve national conferences:

1. Palakkad, Kerala: 7 February 1997
2. Hyderabad, Andhra Pradesh: 21 & 22 March 1998
3. Coimbatore, Tamil Nadu: 7, 8 & 9 December 2001
4. Mangalore, Karnataka: 10 & 11 May 2003
5. Bhatinda, Punjab: 2, 3 & 4 April 2004
6. Pune, Maharashtra: 28 & 29 April 2007
7. Chennai, Tamil Nadu: 26 & 27 December 2009
8. Nagpur, Maharashtra: 11 & 12 February 2012
9. Brahmapur, Odisha: 24 & 25 December 2014
10. Trivandrum, Kerala: 24 & 25 February 2017
11. Visakhapatnam, Andhra Pradesh: 5 & 6 January 2019
12. Barnala, Punjab: 29 & 30 October 2022
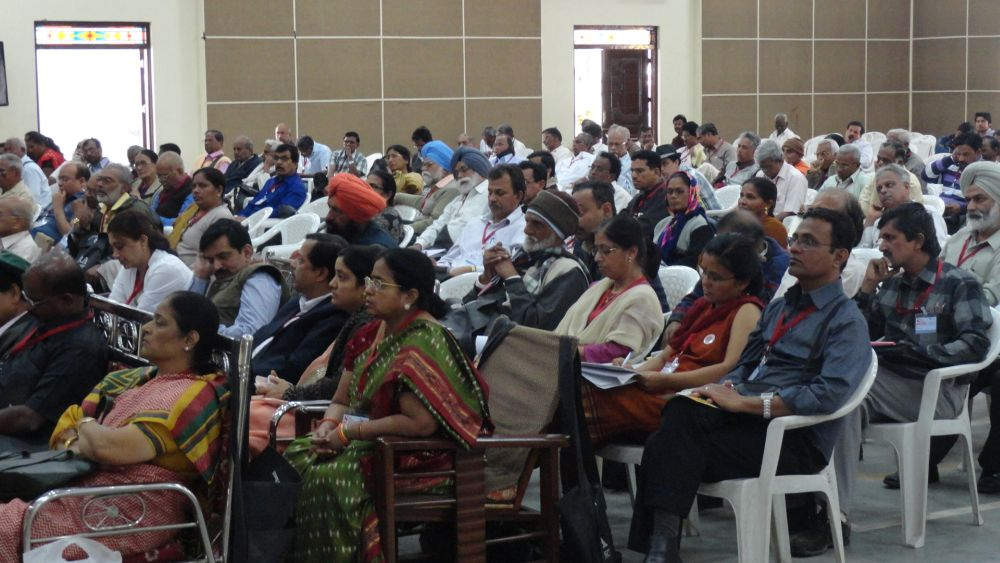
Delegates of 8th National Conference of FIRA held in Nagpur

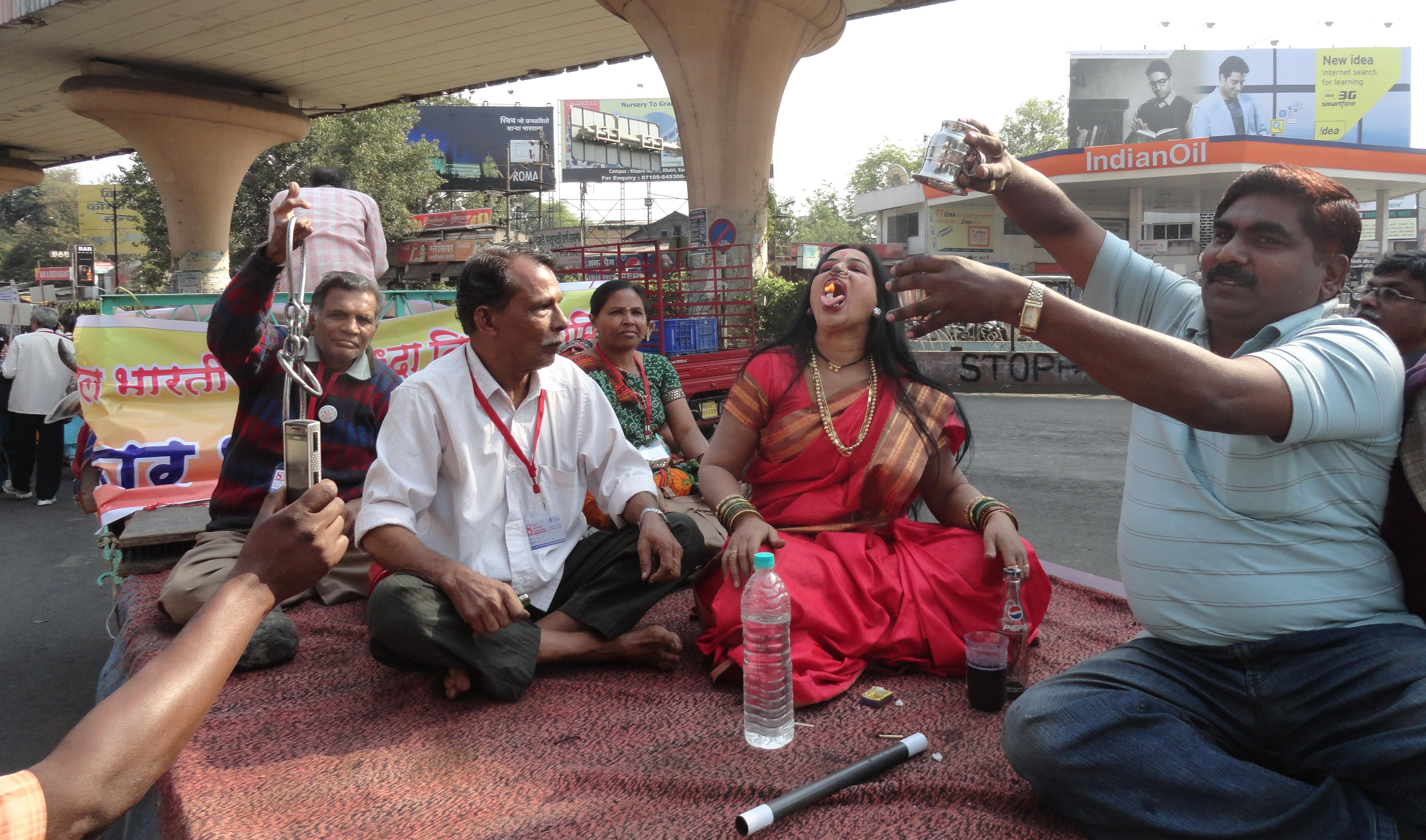
A delegate exposing a so-called 'miracle' of eating fire at the 8th FIRA conference in Nagpur

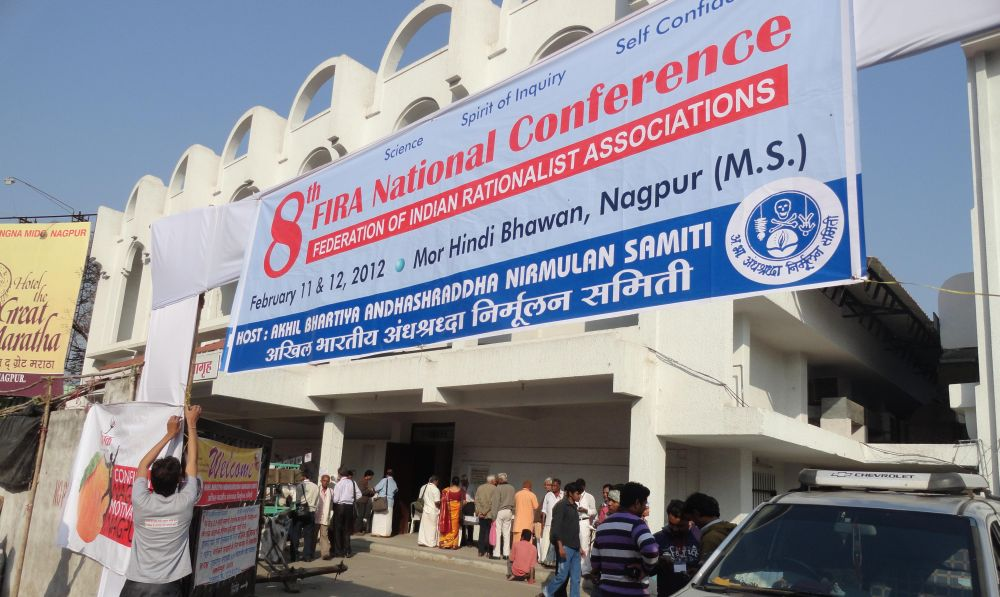
Banner for 8th FIRA National Conference

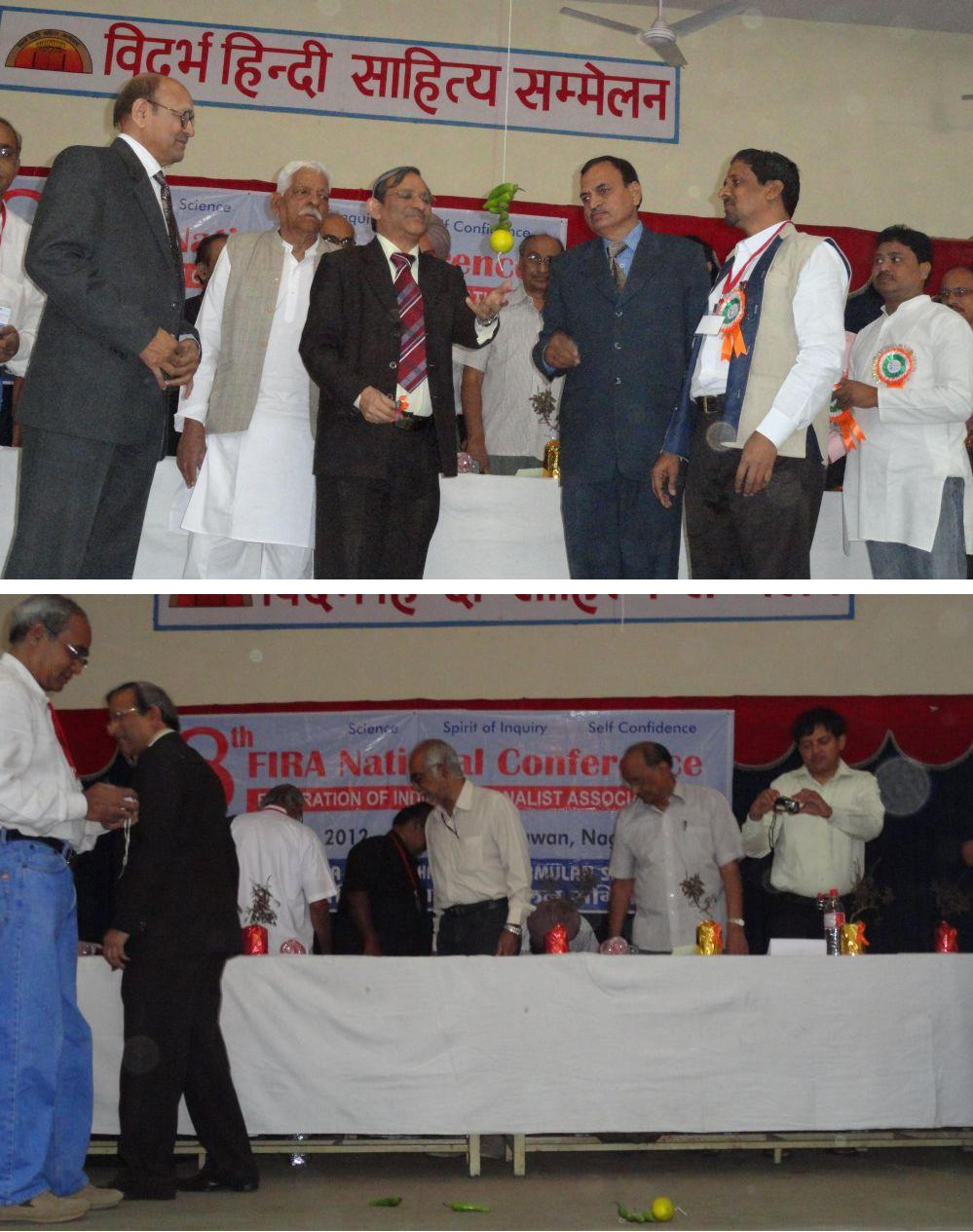
Dr Vilas Sapkal, vice chancellor, Rashtrasant Tukadoji Maharaj Nagpur University, inaugurating the 8th National Conference of FIRA held in Nagpur by cutting a string of seven chilies and a lemon, a charm commonly used by Hindus to ward off evil

== Targeted attacks on rationalists ==
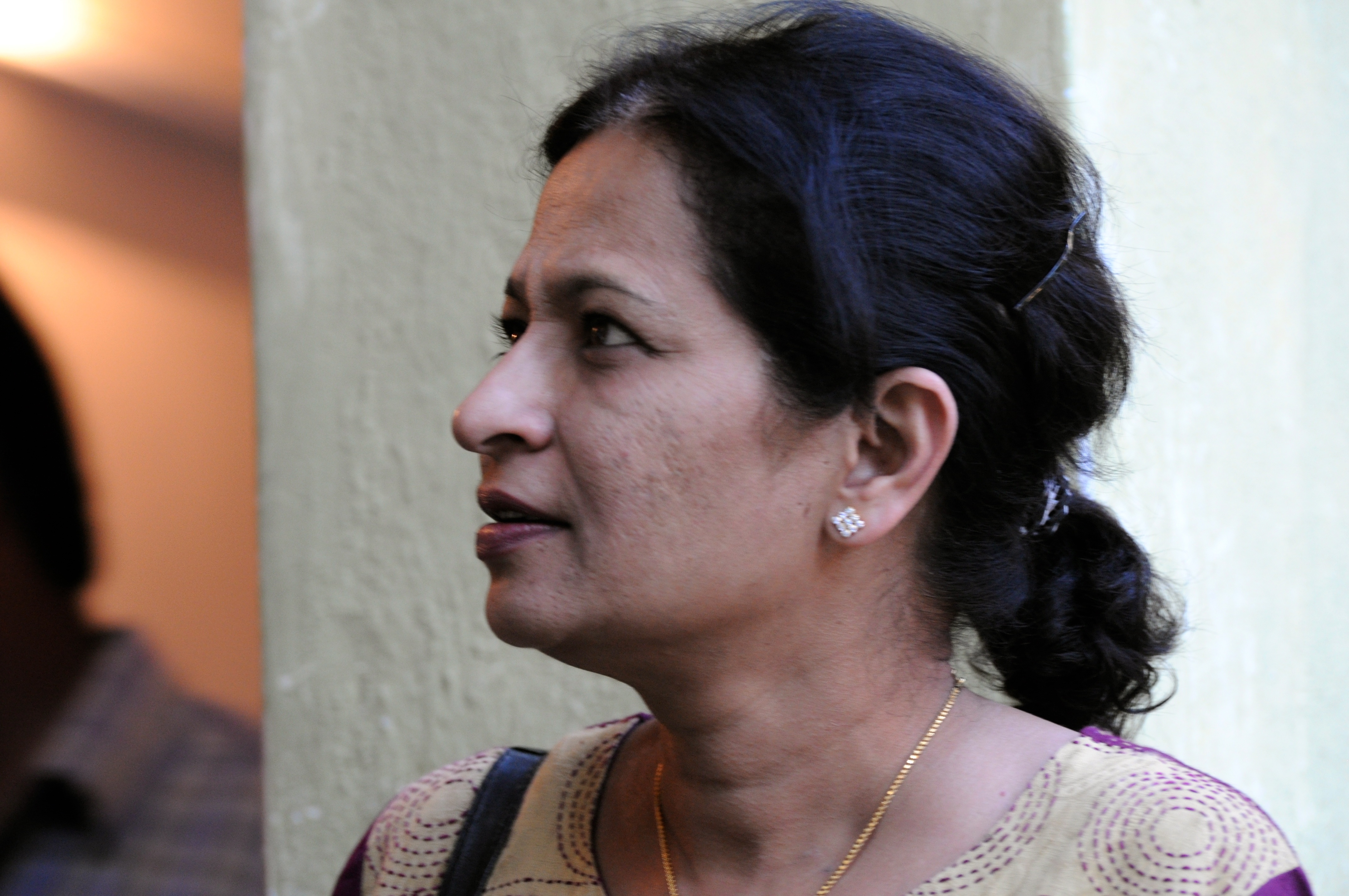
Gauri Lankesh, 14 January 2012

Our Fight to Bring in the Anti-black Magic Law in India, presented by Shantanu Abhyankar at CSICon 2018

Although India is a secular democracy, blasphemy laws are still enforced under the Indian penal code and threats of violence are common for members of the Federation of Indian Rationalist Associations. Secular organizations such as FIRA have received pushback and protest from far-right groups.

In 2017, Gauri Lankesh was assassinated by an unknown terrorist in her home. She was a journalist and rationalist. She was outspoken against Hindutva, a right-wing Indian nationalist movement. The Columbia Journalism Review states that the Hindutva is "associated with activities ranging from lynchings, riots, and bomb blasts to threats of rape, dismemberment, incarceration, and hanging of people critical of them and their sectarian idea of India." Narendra Nayak of FIRA, along with many other international skeptical organizations, condemned the assassination of Gauri Lankesh in a CFI press release stating, "as a fellow member on the hit list of these organizations, I feel sad that I have lost a good friend and a supporter. She was one of those who was not afraid to speak her mind on any issue which she felt was important."

Narendra Dabholkar of the Maharashtra Andhashraddha Nirmoolan Samiti (MANS) was assassinated by gun shot on 20 August 2013 in Pune, Maharashtra. The assassination followed the introduction of the Anti-Superstition and Black Magic Bill which was deemed "anti-Hindu" by far-right groups. In 2018, Dr. Shantanu Abhyankar, President, Maharashtra Andhashraddha Nirmoolan Samiti, presented at CSICon discussing the Anti-Superstition and Black Magic Bill.

== See also ==
- Prabir Ghosh
- Basava Premanand
- List of prizes for evidence of the paranormal
- Narendra Nayak
- Narendra Dabholkar

=== Similar organisations ===
- Indian Humanist Association
- Indian Rationalist Association
- Indian Secular Society
- Radical Humanist Association of India
- Maharashtra Rationalist Association
- Science and Rationalists Association of India
- Manavatavadi Vishwa Sansthan (The International School of Humanitarian Thoughts and Practice), Rajghat, Kurukshetra, Haryana
- Manavavedhy Kerala

=== Rationalism and science in ancient India ===
- Ajita Kesakambali
- Atheism in Hinduism
- Cārvāka
- History of science and technology in India
- Bārhaspatya Sūtras
- Lokayata: A Study in Ancient Indian Materialism
