= Science and Rationalists' Association of India =

Organisation

- Type: Non-profit organisation
- Industry: Education
- Founded: 1985, Kolkata, India
- Headquarters: Kolkata, India

The Science and Rationalists' Association of India (Bengali: ভারতীয় বিজ্ঞান ও যুক্তিবাদী সমিতি, Bharatiya Bigyan O Yuktibadi Samiti) is a rationalist group based in Kolkata, India.

== History ==
The first Indian Rationalist Association was started in 1949 by M.S. Ramanathan along with M.N. Roy and C.N. Annadorai in Chennai.Later Bengali rationalists established an organisation called 'Bharater Yuktibadi Samity' on March 1, 1985, the international rationalists' day. Two years later, in 1987, it was renamed as 'Bharatiya Bigyan O Yuktibadi Samiti'. Prabir Ghosh, the author of the Aloukik Noy Loukik book, series is the founder secretary and Dr. Dhirendranath Gangopadhyay was the first president of this organisation. Eminent science communicators Amit Chakraborty, Aparajito Basu, Jugalkanti Ray, Shankar Chakraborty and others were also associated during its formation. In 1986, Ghosh published the first book of the Aloukik Noy Loukik series, debunking various superstitious beliefs. It received wide circulation among Bengali readers of both West Bengal and Bangladesh, and the Rationalists' Association gained popularity.

== Activities ==
The main goal of the organisation is to advocate against pseudoscience, astrology and mysticism.
