= Maharashtra Andhashraddha Nirmoolan Samiti =

Indian NGO fighting superstition

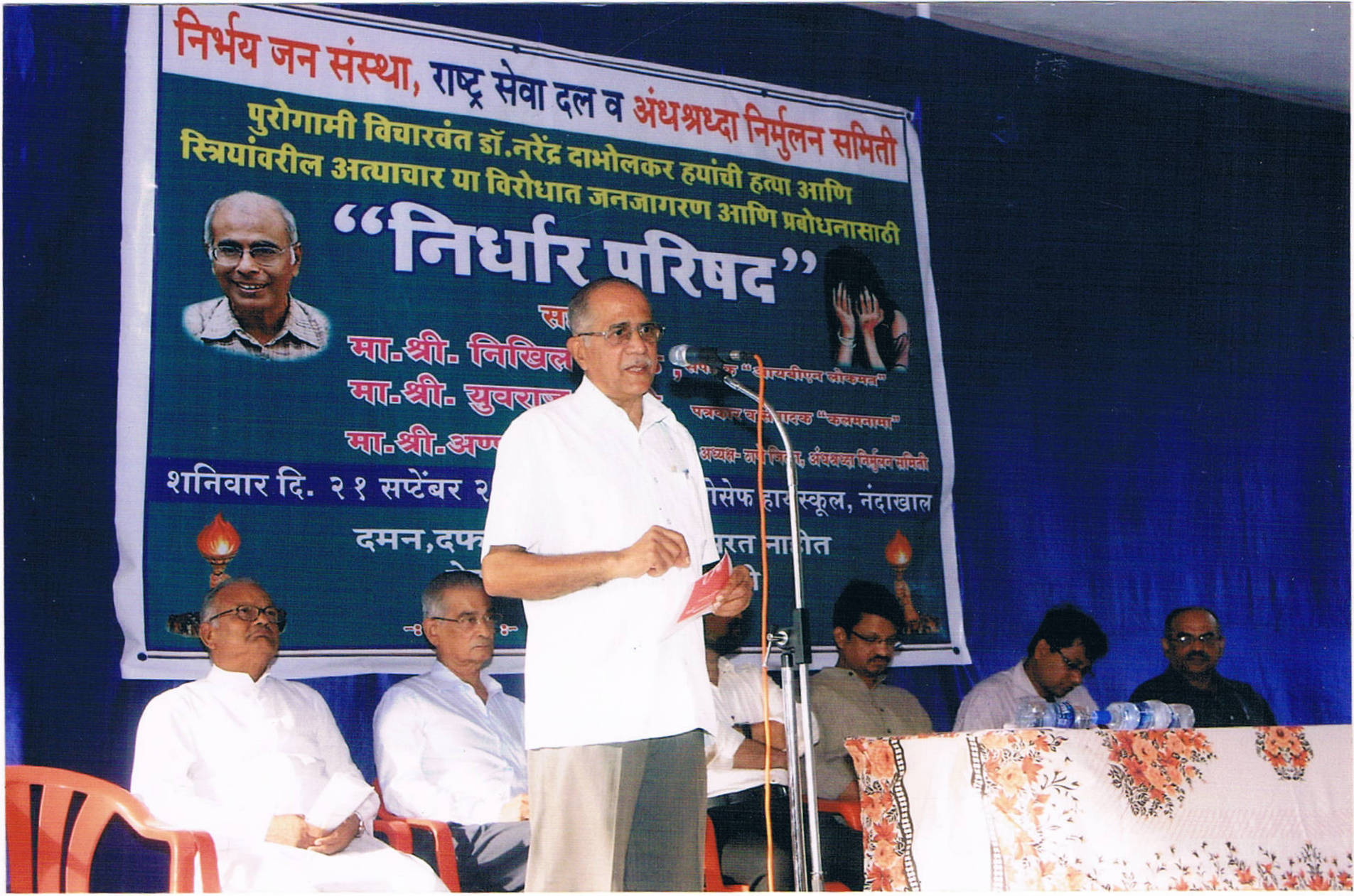
- An awareness campaign organized by the Samiti to highlight Narendra Dabholkar's death
- Founded: 1989 (37 years ago)
- Founder: Narendra Dabholkar

Maharashtra Andhashraddha Nirmulan Samiti (MANS; or Committee for Eradication of Blind Faith, CEBF) is an organisation dedicated to fighting against religion and superstition in India, particularly in the state of Maharashtra. It was founded by Narendra Dabholkar in 1989. Since 2010, the organization has been headed by Avinash Patil.

== History and work ==
MANS was founded by Narendra Dabholkar in 1989. In 1999, MANS had protested the canonisation of Mother Teresa on the basis of purported miracles, although they had praised her service to the ailing and diseased.

The organisation campaigned against immersion of Ganesha idols in water bodies and urged people to use smaller idols and vegetable dyes to avoid polluting rivers and lakes. MANS proposed that citizens could instead immerse the idols into the tanks built specially for this purpose on the riverbanks.

In 2011, MANS protested the torture of mentally ill people under the superstitious belief that it will cure them. Such practices were carried out in a dargah in Chalisgaon.

MANS has also challenged godmen who claim to perform miracles. In December 2002, a prize of ₹11 lakh was announced to be given to anyone who could perform one of the listed 12 miracles. The list included walking on water, floating in air, standing on hot coals for five minutes, being present in two places simultaneously and materialising necklaces from thin air, among others. Members of MANS toured rural areas debunking these godmen.

They have campaigned against astrology. In October 2009, MANS organised a contest with a prize money of ₹21 lakh challenging astrologers to predict the results of the Maharashtra Assembly poll election with at least 80% accuracy.

== Internal Rift in Maharashtra Andhashraddha Nirmoolan Samiti (MANS) ==
A leadership dispute has emerged within MANS following the appointment of Saroj Patil as its head, highlighting tensions between members and the Dabholkar family. Avinash Patil, a close associate of founder Narendra Dabholkar, accused Hamid and Mukta Dabholkar of undemocratic practices and mismanagement of trust funds.

== Anti-Superstition and Black Magic Bill ==
MANS had been campaigning for a law to check the exploitation of people's superstitions in Maharashtra for a long time. In 1989 at the Andhashraddha Nirmoolan Jahirnama Parishad held that year in Pune, then Chief minister Sharad Pawar had indicated the formation of a law in that direction. The issue was raised again in 1995 in the Legislative Council. On 28 July 2003, MANS members organised a hunger strike outside the State Assembly in Mumbai to protest the state's inaction.

On 2 March 2009, MANS members wrote a letter in blood and sent to then Chief Minister Ashok Chavan and others to urge them to take steps towards the passing of the law. On 7 April 2011, they organized a rally to spread awareness about the law. They also ran telegram-sending campaign from 7 July to 25 July 2011 to draw attention to the issue. The telegrams were sent to the Chief Minister.

Dabholkar was murdered on 20 August 2013. The pending Anti-Superstition and Black Magic Ordinance was promulgated in the state of Maharashtra, four days after his death.

== Financial ==
In 2017, the Ministry of Home Affairs issued a showcase notice to MANS for not disclosing foreign funds which constituted a violation of the Foreign Contribution (Regulation) Act (FCRA), 2010.

== See also ==
- Sapiens Foundation
- Federation of Indian Rationalist Associations
