= Maharashtra Rationalist Association =

Rationalism and humanism organisation

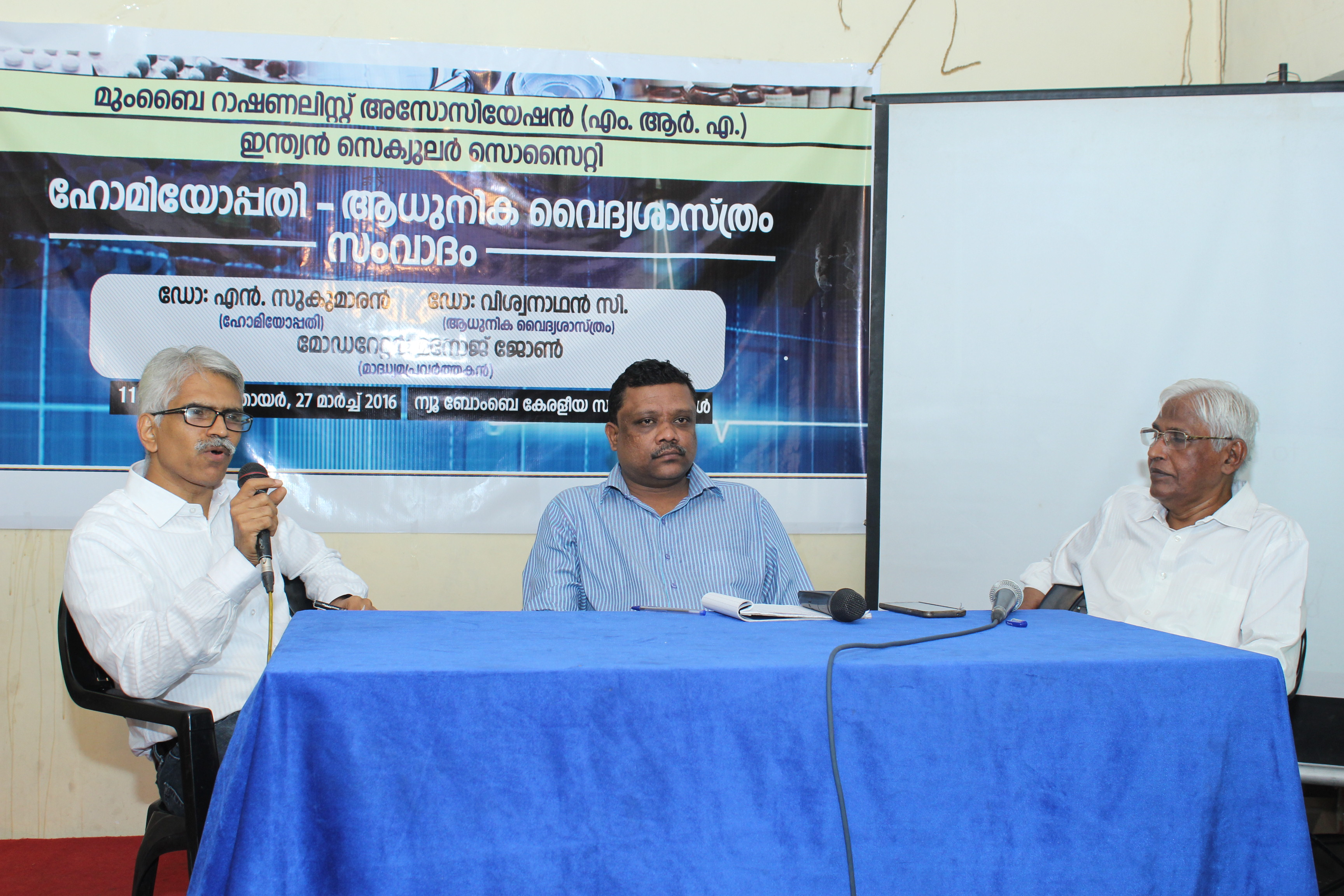
Debate on Homeopathy Vs Modern Medicine held at Nerul, Navi Mumbai, on Sunday, 27 March, 2016. (From Left) Viswanathan C, orthopaedic surgeon, Manoj John, journalist, and N. Sukumaran, homeopathy practitioner.

Maharashtra Rationalist Association was an organisation dedicated to spreading rationalism and humanism in Maharashtra, India, and was an integral part of the rationalist movement in Maharashtra. The organisation is succeeded by Mumbai Rationalist Association, which in turn has paved the way for Sunday Sapiens

== History ==
The Maharashtra Rationalist Association was an offshoot of the broad social and religious reformation movement in Maharashtra which traces its origin to the nineteenth century in the thoughts and actions of Jyotiba Phule and Shahu Maharaj, Jawaharlal Nehru, Ramaswami Naicker, B.R. Ambedkar, M.N. Roy, Goparaju Ramachandra Rao 'Gora' and Sahodaran Ayyappan moulded the rationalist mode of thinking in India in the 20th century. Among the first rationalist organisations in India were Rationalist Association of India which was set up in 1930, and Yukthivadi Sangham which was registered in 1935. The Atheist Centre launched by Mahatma Gandhi's follower Goparaju Ramachandra Rao "Gora" in Andhra Pradesh in 1940, and the Indian Rationalist Association (IRA) set up in Chennai with R.P. Paranjpye as founding president were among the other important organisations in the Indian rationalist movement. Maharashtra Rationalist Association was one of the first rationalist organisations in Maharashtra.

It was headed by noted personalities like Justice Raghavendra A. Jahagirdar, a retired judge of the Bombay High Court who passed several landmark judgments. Yahya A. Lokhandwala, who also served as the president of Indian Rationalist Association, and Rajeev Joshi were other prominent leaders of Maharashtra Rationalist Association. Lokhandwala wrote about rationalist activities in India in international publications like American Atheist Magazine.

Maharashtra Rationalist Association was the fulcrum of organised rationalism in the state. It played a pivotal role in mobilising support for irreligion in India well into the 1980s. Activists of Maharashtra Rationalist Association and two other organisations demonstrated on Tuesday, 12 May 1981 against self-styled godman Sathya Sai Baba and against the participation of O.P. Mehra, the Governor of the secular state of Maharashtra, in a religious function at Dharmakshetra, Mumbai. They shouted slogans such as "Sai Baba is a trickster!" The activists were arrested and taken to police station. The next day, the Governor invited Lokhandwala to his official residence and expressed regret for the arrest and the misbehaviour of his staff. The event received wide publicity in the media and cemented Maharashtra Rationalist Association's position as a formidable force in the renaissance movement in Maharashtra.

Bombay Rationalist Association (BRA), which worked among the Malayali emigrants in Mumbai, merged into Maharashtra Rationalist Association. The association was very active during the period before the rationalist movement split into several organisations. Maharashtra Rationalist Association became inactive over time for unspecified reasons.

== Current status ==
Maharashtra Rationalist Association is the predecessor of Mumbai Rationalist Association, which has since paved the way for Sunday Sapiens in order to broadbase its scope into a wide range of activities such as environmentalism, LGBT rights and human rights. Sunday Sapiens is a registered non-profit organisation affiliated to Humanist International, London, and Atheist Alliance International, Washington, D.C., which have special consultative status at the United Nations. The organisation conducts events and runs campaigns under the better known banner We The Sapiens, and is headed by its chief executive Manoj John, who is also the Development Director of Atheist Alliance International.

== See also ==
- Humanists International
- Maharashtra Andhashraddha Nirmoolan Samiti
