= Sanal Edamaruku =

Indian rationalist (born 1955)

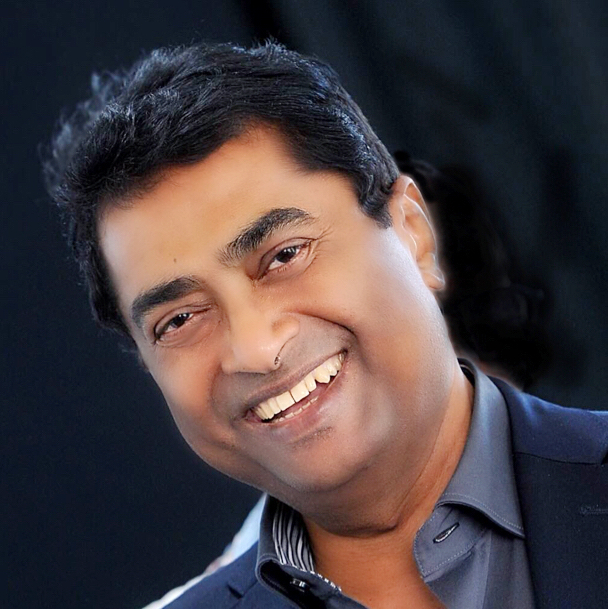
- Sanal Edamaruku in Finland
- Born: 26 May 1955 (age 71); Thodupuzha, Kerala, India
- Education: Jawaharlal Nehru University, New Delhi
- Known for: President of the Indian Rationalist Association and founder-President of Rationalist International
- Parent(s): Joseph Edamaruku; Soley Edamaruku

Sanal Edamaruku (born 26 May 1955) is an Indian author and rationalist. He is the founder-president and editor of Rationalist International, the president of the Indian Rationalist Association and the author of 36 books and other articles. In 2012, after examining an alleged miracle at a local church in Mumbai, he was charged under India's blasphemy law, causing him to voluntarily exile to Finland.

== Early life ==
Edamaruku was born in 1955 in Thodupuzha, Kerala, India to Joseph Edamaruku, an Indian scholar and author, and Soley Edamaruku. Born in a Christian-Hindu mixed marriage, he was brought up without any specific religious influence. At his parents' insistence, he was the first student in India whose official school records listed "no religion".

He became a rationalist-atheist activist at the age of 15, after seeing a neighbourhood athlete's death when her family refused medical treatment because they believed in faith healing.

== Rationalist activism ==
Edamaruku has been active in the Indian Rationalist Association (IRA) from the age of 15. Before becoming the president in 2005, he served as the General Secretary beginning in 1983, and has been the editor of its publication Modern Freethinker. His many books and articles deal mainly with rationalistic thoughts and against superstition in India. His writings in Rationalist International are translated into English, French, German, Spanish, and Finnish.

In February 2011, Edamaruku was elected as a Fellow of the Committee for Skeptical Inquiry. (USA) and is an Honorary Associate of New Zealand Association of Rationalists and Humanists and Rationalist Association of UK (formerly Rationalist Press Association).

Edamaruku conducted investigation and campaigns in Indian villages, targeting mystics, god men and practices he deems superstitious. He refers to this as "Rationalist Reality Theatre." The documentary film Guru Busters shows Edamaruku and a team of rationalist campaigners on the road in Kerala demonstrations of how to perform supposedly supernatural stunts. He has helped in building Indian Atheist Publishers, which is now Asia's largest atheist publishing house. He convened nine International Rationalist Conferences held in 1995, 2000, 2002, 2005, 2016, 2017, 2019, and 2024. In December 2013, Edamaruku launched a new quarterly English language magazine The Rationalist on his blog.

=== The Great Tantra Challenge ===
On 3 March 2008, while appearing on a panel TV show, Edamaruku challenged a tantrik to demonstrate his powers by killing him using only magic. The live show on India TV where the tantrik chanted mantras and performed a ceremony received a large boost in ratings. After his attempts failed, the tantrik reported that Edamaruku must be under the protection of a powerful god, to which Edamaruku responded that he is an atheist.

=== Weeping crucifix investigation ===
In March 2012, Sanal Edamaruku investigated a report that a crucifix at Our Lady of Velankanni church in Mumbai was dripping water from the feet. This incident, though not recognised by the Catholic Church as a miracle, was believed by locals to be one. Sanal Edamaruku was invited to investigate by TV9 of Mumbai with the consent of the church authorities. He went with an engineer to the site where the alleged miracle had happened, and traced the source of the drip to the rear side. Edamaruku found that the water was seeping through the feet because of capillary action and faulty plumbing. Moisture on the wall where the statue was mounted seemed to be coming from an overflowing drain, which was in turn fed by a pipe that issued from a nearby toilet.

=== Comments and aftermath ===
During a television show held to discuss the investigation, Edamaruku accused Christian priests of regularly scamming devotees and defrauding miracles to make money, and build bigger and newer churches and convents, and the Pope of being "anti-science" and scoffed at Christians for worshipping the cross. A Catholic lawyer asked Edamaruku to apologise whilst on television, which he refused to do. Such defamatory statements lead to the Catholic Secular Forum filing First information reports under Section 295(A) of the Indian Penal Code in April 2012.

The All India Catholic Union said the law was being applied incorrectly. Colin Gonsalves, the founder of the India Center for Human Rights and Law, stated his opinion that no criminal offence had been committed. Vishal Dadlani, Richard Dawkins and James Randi publicly spoke in Edamaruku's defense while others accused Edamaruku of being "as much of a missionary seeking converts for his particular “ism” as the Church is for its own belief." The Catholic Archdiocese of Bombay, which was not associated with the criminal charges, called for Edamaruku to apologise and for the prosecution to drop the charges. Edamaruku refused and on 31 July 2012 moved to Finland.

== Views ==
Edamaruku is a frequent critic of Hindu astrology and other practices he deems superstititious. He also has accused Indian Godmen of mostly being charlatans amassing wealth and property from supposed miracles.

Edamaruku also has been a critic of Mother Teresa, publicly attacking her legacy in Kolkata. He has spoken out against the Catholic Church's veneration of Mother Teresa and the miracle cure of Monica Besra, who was reportedly cured after a medallion was placed on her by nuns. Edamaruku said that her cure could be reasonably ascribed to the treatment she received in a government hospital in Balurghat and the North Bengal Medical College and Hospital. After investigating her care record the former health minister of West Bengal, Partho De, has agreed her recovery was attributable to her months of medical care. Edamaruku describes the miracle as an "obvious fraud."

Edamaruku considers the Indian rationalist movement an "inspiring example for many western rationalists to awaken, activate and rejuvenate their own organisations", with India's rationalists being "on the frontline of the battle between science and superstition".

Edamaruku has been critical of India's blasphemy laws, describing them as "relics of colonial legislation" which have been abused to "hound and silence" intellectuals and artists who question religious beliefs. He considers it dangerous that any person may register a complaint of blasphemy against another, leading to an arrest and prolonged imprisonment until the suspect is acquitted by a court of law. Edamaruku argues that the real danger here is less the verdict and more the "pre-trial punishment".

== Imprisonment in Poland ==
Sanal Edamaruku was arrested on 28 March 2025 at the Modlin airport in Warsaw when he arrived to address an International Human Rights Conference starting the next day. The arrest was made, followed by the issuance of an Interpol Red Notice issued by the Alappuzha District Court in 2019. He was released and returned to Finland after 5 months of pre-trial detention. The Red Notice, a request to locate and provisionally arrest individuals pending extradition or prosecution, was issued after Edamaruku could not respond to the court summons in 2018 in a case accusing him of defrauding a government employee, Prameela Devi, of 15 lakhs.

Devi alleged that Edamaruku had promised her a visa, job, and residence permit in Finland in exchange for the money. However, according to Yle, Devi made a complaint against Edamaruku in Finland too, while the Indian case was still open. The Helsinki District Court removed the fraud charge against Edamaruku in February 2025 but found him guilty of aggravated embezzlement and imposed a suspended sentence of six months, pending appeal, with the decision available for review until April 22. Despite the court decision in Helsinki, the Indian authorities asked for his extradition to India. His daughter, Sakhty Edamaruku, stated that she would try to avoid his extradition to India, citing potential threats to his life, and suspected the timing of the notice and his arrest were meant to interfere with his appeal process in Finland.

On 7 May 2025, a Polish court decided to extend his detention until 27 May, and on 26 May it again extended it to 27 September. Edamaruku's arrest warrant in India was recalled by the Chief Judicial Magistrate of Alappuzha, following an order of the Kerala High Court on 28 July. His release was further delayed for months. Upon release from prison, he returned to Finland on 9 September. About his imprisonment in Poland, Edamaruku said: “This has been a difficult period — not just for me, but for my family and supporters worldwide. I am deeply grateful to those who stood by me during these months of detention. This ordeal was never about a financial dispute. It has been engineered by those who have long opposed my work and my voice. The legal battle is far from over, but I draw strength from the solidarity shown to me. It reinforces my lifelong belief that truth and reason must always prevail over intimidation and fear.”
