= Indian Rationalist Association =

Organisation that promotes scientific skepticism

- Formation: 1949
- Purpose: To promote scientific skepticism and critique supernatural claims
- Headquarters: New Delhi, NCT of Delhi, India
- Key people: R. P. Paranjpye (founding president); S. Ramanathan (Secretary), G. N. Jyothi Sankar; M. V. Ramamurthy
- Publication: The Indian Rationalist, Freethought, Modern Freethinker, Reason
- Affiliations: Rationalist International

The Indian Rationalist Association is a voluntary organisation in India whose 100,000 members promote scientific skepticism and critique supernatural claims. It publishes books and magazines, organises seminars and lectures and its representatives regularly appear in television and print media exposing superstitions. The present president of Indian Rationalist Association Sanal Edamaruku was elected in 2005. He was the General Secretary of the association from 1984 till 2005.

The earlier name of Indian Rationalist Association was "Rationalist Association of India". The organisation published a journal "Reason", both of which ceased to exist after a few years. Later in 1949, the organisation was re-organised in Madras (present Chennai) in 1949. The founding president was R. P. Paranjpye (later High Commissioner of India in Australia and vice-chancellor of Bombay University). S. Ramanathan was the Secretary, who also edited and published The Indian Rationalist. After the death of S. Ramanathan, Professor R. S. Yadav from Meerut became the President of the Association. When he became the vice-chancellor of Meerut University, Ellen Roy, wife of M. N. Roy, was elected the new president. Upon her death in 1960, the headquarters of Indian Rationalist Association was once again moved to Madras, and was revived by Dr. G. N. Jyothi Sankar. He also established a Ramanathan memorial rationalist library in Chennai. This library was later moved to Hyderabad when M. V. Ramamurthy was the General Secretary of the Association.

Dr G. N. Jyothi Sankar organized the All-India Miracle Exposure campaigns four times with legendary Sri Lankan Rationalist Abraham Kovoor, starting in 1975.

The Indian Rationalist Association has branches in different states of India, with the headquarters of the association located in New Delhi. The Indian Rationalist Association took the initiative to form the Rationalist International in 1995, which organizes many International Rationalist Conferences in co-operation with the Indian Rationalist Association. Sanal Edamaruku is the founding president of Rationalist International.

== History and office-bearers ==
The present Indian Rationalist Association was founded in 1949 by S. Ramanathan, M. N. Roy and C. N. Annadurai; the president was R. P. Paranjpye.

The Rationalist, edited by S. Ramanathan; Freethought, edited by G.N. Jyothi Sankar; and Modern Freethinker, edited by Sanal Edamaruku were the prominent journals published by the Indian Rationalist Association.

Indian Rationalist Association organized two major all-India campaigns, Divine Miracle Exposure lectures by Abraham Kovoor (1975-1978), and an all-India miracle exposure tour campaign under the leadership of Sanal Edamaruku 1994-1995. The campaign led by Sanal Edamaruku covered 100 districts in India and took 18 months to complete. This campaign was featured in the British documentary Guru Busters.

The regular participation and public challenges of Sanal Edamaruku against the Indian gurus, and his campaigns to explain miracles and superstitions with science brought the Indian Rationalist association to national prominence. BBC and many Indian newspapers have featured the campaigns of Sanal Edamaruku.

The office bearers of Indian Rationalist Association:

Presidents: R. P. Paranjpye (1949 - 1957), R. S. Yadav (1957 - 1959), Ellen Roy (1959 - 1960), R. P. Paranjpye (1960 - 1966), Gora (1966 - 1975), Y. A. Lokhandwala (1975 - 1982), M. V. Ramamurthy (1982 - 1983), Dr H. Narasimhaiah (1983 - 1985), M. V. Ramamurthy (1985 - 1994), Ravipudi Venkatadri (1994 - 1995), Malladi Subbamma (1995 - 1996), Joseph Edamaruku (1996 - 2005), Sanal Edamaruku (2005 - ).

General secretaries: S. Ramanathan (1949 - 1970), Dr G. N. Jyothi Sankar (1970 - 1979), A. Suryanarayana (1979 - 1981), M. V. Ramamurthy (1981 - 1983), Sanal Edamaruku (1983 - 2005), K. G. Gopal (2005 - 2011), Ajoy Roy (2011 - 2018), K. G. Gopal (2018 - 2019), Manoj Lal Bhanu (2019 - ).

Indian Atheist Publishers, a publishing house jointly started by Indian Rationalist Association and Sanal Edamaruku in New Delhi in 1982, published many original rationalist books and translations of hundreds of the world's rationalist classics in Indian languages.

The Divine Miracle Exposure Campaign conducted across India under the leadership of Abraham Kovoor, the All-India Miracle Exposure Campaign of Sanal Edamaruku during 1994-95, several popular books written by Joseph Edamaruku, and hundreds of TV presentations of Sanal Edamaruku gave unprecedented popularity for the rationalist movement. Organised rationalist associations came up in each and every State and each of the State units got affiliated to Indian Rationalist Association as parent body of rationalists and atheists in the country.

== Activities ==
The Indian Rationalist Association attempts to oppose superstition and pseudoscience in India. It has led media and educational campaigns debunking the Monkey-man of Delhi monster hysteria, godmen, claims of miraculous milk-drinking statues, superstitions related to solar eclipses, and even the beliefs behind ritual human sacrifices.

Sometimes referred to as "guru busters", the group critiques India's culturally influential godmen. They perform magic demonstrations that replicate the purportedly miraculous feats of the godmen, such as walking on coals, producing sacred ash from thin air, exploding stones with "mental power", levitating, or turning water into blood. Thousands of volunteers assist with these demonstrations throughout India.

Similarly, the Indian Rationalist Association demonstrates on television how ordinary statues can appear to drink milk and other fluids.

Working with the Dakshina Kannada Rationalist Association, the Indian Rationalist Association opposed a 2009 proposal to make yoga a compulsory subject for high school and primary school students in Mangalore.

== In popular culture ==
The Australian writer Greg Egan has featured the Indian Rationalist Association and Sanal Edamaruku in his novel Teranesia.

== See also ==
- Maharashtra Rationalist Association
