= Godman (India) =

Guru who claims paranormal powers

Godman is a term used in India for a type of faith healer or spiritual leader who is often raised to a demigod-like figure by their cult following. They generally claim to possess advanced spiritual attainments and paranormal powers, such as the ability to heal, the ability to see or influence future events, and the ability to read minds. Godmen usually have a high-profile presence, and attract support from large sections of Indian society.

== Overview ==
Godmen are revered as special human beings and often worshipped by their followers. Some godmen come from established schools of spirituality, but often they do not belong to any religious order. In recent years, many godmen have gained followers outside of India, which has increased their fame and wealth.

Sathya Sai Baba (1926–2011) was a notable godman with a very large following. He was known for alleged miracles like materialising sacred ash (vibhuti), and other objects like watches and jewels. He was also involved in philanthropy, which include hospitals, schools and universities.

Neem Karoli Baba (c. 1900–1973) is another well-known godman revered by many in the United States, a guru to whom innumerable miracles have been attributed.

There are also female gurus who are considered divine and are revered by their followers, some having been spouses and collaborators of noted male gurus. Female gurus who are considered to be divine or saintly by their followers include Mirra Alfassa (1878–1973), Anandamayi Ma (1896–1982), Mata Amritanandamayi (born 1953), and Mother Meera (born 1960).

Although few godmen have allowed their powers to be examined scientifically, Swami Rama became famous by participating in the biofeedback research conducted by Elmer Green at the Menninger Foundation around 1970.

== Political patronage ==
Several godmen have found patronage among politicians and other high-ranking officials. Sathya Sai Baba had several devotees in the political field. They include Bharatiya Janata Party (BJP) politician L. K. Advani. In 2001, an official letter was issued that defended Sathya Sai Baba against accusations. The signatories included then Prime Minister Atal Bihari Vajpayee, former Chief Justices P. N. Bhagwati and Ranganath Misra and former Home Minister Shivraj Patil.

In 2006, Ravi Shankar was nominated for the Nobel Peace Prize by U.S. Congressman Joseph Crowley. In June 2007, former President of India Pratibha Patil claimed to have had a visitation from Dada Lekhraj (1876–1969) giving her the premonition of her nomination as the President.

In September 2013, Shobhan Sarkar claimed to have dreamt of gold buried under the palace of Rao Ram Baksh Singh, a 19th-century king. One of his disciples contacted Charan Das Mahant, then the Union Minister of State in the Ministry of Food Processing Industries, who in turn convinced various other officials. Later, Archaeological Survey of India (ASI) conducted surveys of the site on 12 October and announced an excavation on 15 October. On 18 November 2013, after finding no signs of gold ASI stopped the excavation and began filling up the trenches.

== Debunking of alleged miracles ==
The Federation of Indian Rationalist Associations (FIRA) has organised seminars to expose how alleged miracles are actually performed by sleight of hand. Members of the Indian Rationalist Association travel to villages across India and perform shows to debunk miracles, educating villagers to keep them from giving money to godmen. Maharashtra Andhashraddha Nirmoolan Samiti (MANS) and the Maharashtra Rationalist Association are also actively engaged in exposing false claims of spiritual gurus.

=== Common miracles and explanations ===
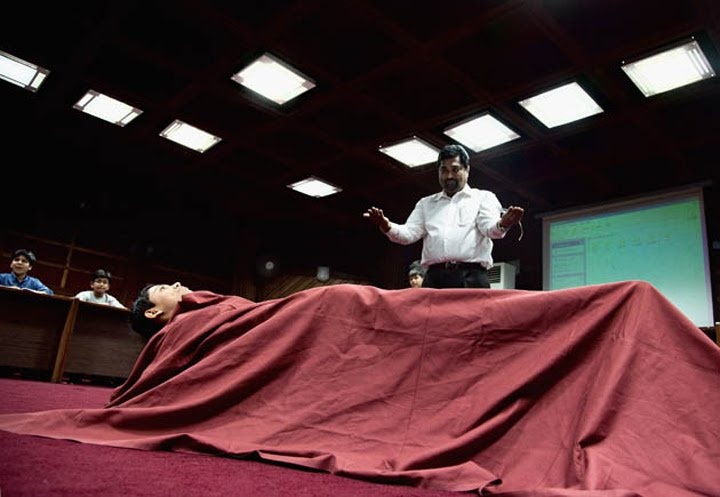
Sanal Edamaruku debunking a "levitation trick"

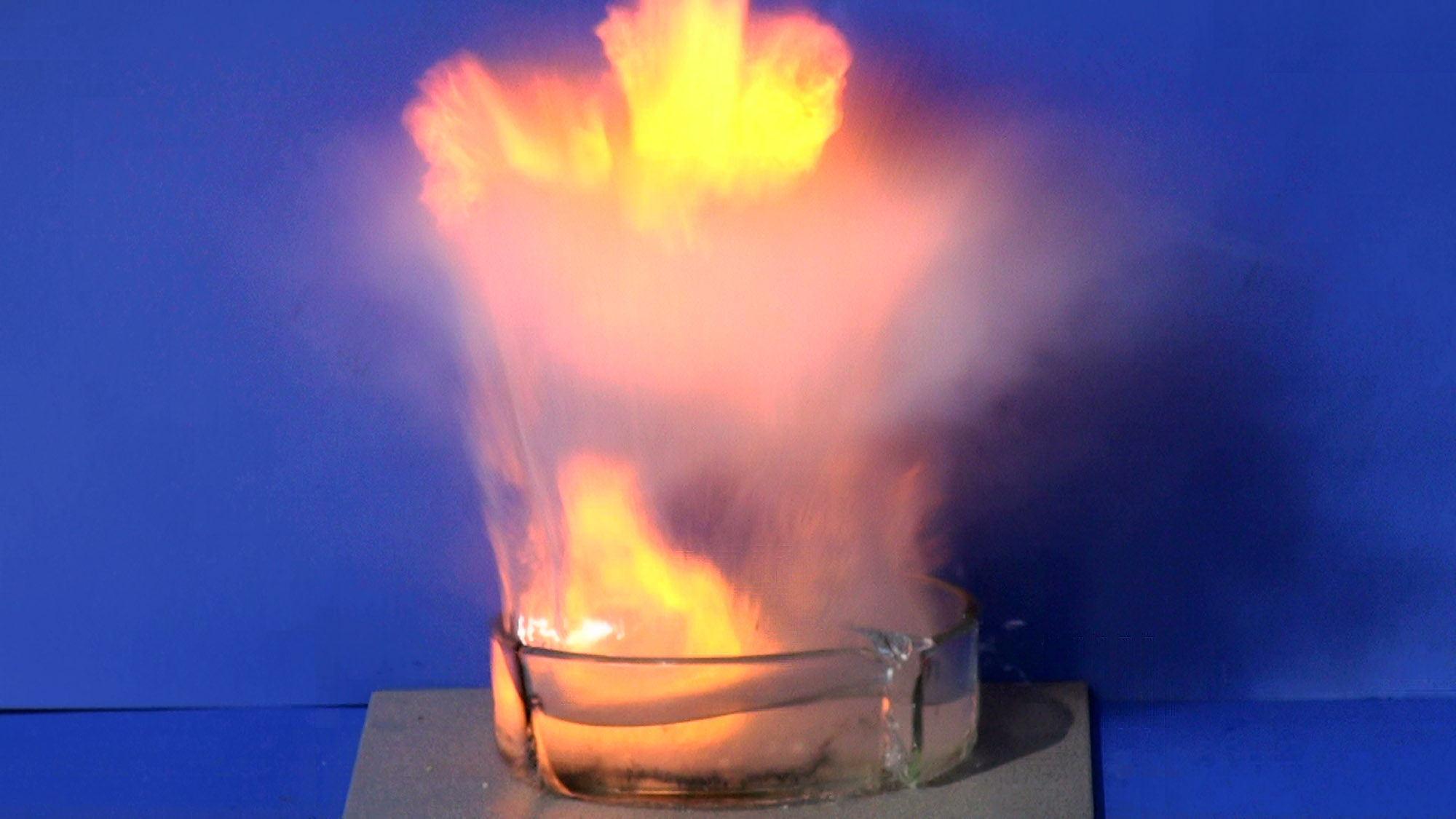
A popular trick often shown by godmen is simply a chemical reaction of sodium and water.

- Levitation of a person under a blanket: The trick is done by lying on the floor covered by a blanket and slowly sitting up while holding out two hockey sticks to mimic the rising of the legs and feet.
- Levitation of a person holding a stick: In this trick, the person appears to be floating above a mat supported only by bamboo stick held in his hand. The hollow bamboo stick and performer's robes contain a bracket which supports the person's weight and a rod runs through the bamboo and is anchored hidden under the mat.
- Making rocks explode by sprinkling holy water: The rocks have sodium crystals embedded in them, which reacts to ordinary water and expands rapidly.
- Creating fire by pouring ghee on wood: The wood pile contains potassium permanganate. It reacts to the glycerine, which is passed off as ghee, and catches fire.
- Fire eating or carrying flames on palm: A cube of burning camphor can be held safely for a few seconds, by practice. It can also be held on the tongue. If the camphor becomes too hot, the performer exhales and closes the mouth, putting out the flame.
- Walking on burning coals: There is salt sprinkled on the coal which draws moisture; or the performer has wet his feet, forming a layer of dirt on them. If the performer walks quickly, he will not get burned.

== See also ==
- Aghori
- Global Baba, a 2016 movie
- Superstition in India
- Theios aner
