= In the Line of Fire: A Memoir =

Autobiography of Pervez Musharraf

- First edition cover
- Author: Pervez Musharraf
- Language: English
- Subject: Autobiography, Memoir
- Publisher: Free Press
- Publication date: 2006
- Publication place: Pakistan
- English publication date: September 25, 2006
- Media type: Hardcover
- Pages: 368
- ISBN: 074-3283449
- OCLC: 70778393
- Dewey Decimal: 954.9105/3 22
- LC Class: DS389.22.M87 A3 2006

In the Line of Fire: A Memoir is a book that was written by former President of Pakistan Pervez Musharraf and first published on September 25, 2006. The book contains a collection of Musharraf's memories and is being marketed as his official autobiography.

== Synopsis ==
The book consists topics regarding Musharraf's personal life to the international and national issues and his rise to power. He writes about his childhood, education and life. The memoir also includes some very important international events which had direct connection with Musharraf and his policies. Besides these he writes about his life in Pakistan Army and the major assassination attempts on him. He also states that he wasn't involved in the 1979 Makkah seizure

== Views on war against India ==
Musharraf writes in his memoir about the wars that took place between the two rival countries after independence, namely Indo-Pakistani War of 1965, Indo-Pakistani War of 1971 and 1999 Kargil Conflict. He also writes about the Pakistan's unsuccessful Operation Ababeel which was launched to preempt India's Operation Meghdoot. According to Musharraf, India started all the wars and crossed the Line of Control on each conflict, of which, according to him, United Nations had forbidden.

== About Nawaz Sharif ==
The book includes a chapter on Pakistani military coup in 1999 against Nawaz Sharif and reveals his view point on Sharif's plane hijacking. He criticizes Nawaz for setting him aside as military commander and believes Nawaz and his brother Shahbaz Sharif had been under the immense influence of their father, Mian Mohammad Sharif, who influenced prime minister his son Nawaz Sharif to stage the coup against him.

== On September 11 ==
Musharraf, in his memoir, says, he had little choice after the September 11 attacks but to back the U.S.-led war on terror. Pervez Musharraf agreed to back the U.S. led war against terror, fearing the threats made by that time U.S. Secretary of State Colin Powell on a phone call to him. He said "You are either with us or against us". The next day, he says, Powell's then deputy, Richard Armitage, telephoned the chief of Pakistan's top spy agency, and threatened to nuke Pakistan back to the stone age.

On the pressure aforementioned, Musharraf accepted all the seven points, set before him as demands, by Colin Powell. This readiness amazed Washington and has been criticized since in Pakistan.

== Editions ==
Hindi version

Currently the book is published in five editions: Pak (English & Urdu), US (English), UK (English) and Indian (Hindi). All feature the picture of Pervez Musharraf at the centre of the green and white background. The Urdu edition hit the market 3 weeks after the initial publication in English.

In the US edition the president appears in a salutary posture with his right hand fingers touching the forehead. In the UK edition, the author seems in a thinking posture with his left hand fingers kept on his chin. In comparison with the US edition, the UK edition sports a crescent on the silky green background of the book.

=== In India ===
All the 8000 copies of the English version were sold out in India during the initial stage of the launch. The Indian distributor had ordered another 4000 copies to meet the demand, according to the news reports. Copies sold in India outnumbered the copies sold in Pakistan citing the curiosity in analyzing his viewpoints. A lot of views from India were that the curiosity of Indian readers has only added to the sales and popularity of the book.

==== Hindi edition ====
A New Delhi publisher published the Hindi version of his book titled as Agnipath (The Path of Fire), ostensibly after a popular 1990 Indian film of the same name whose lead actor, Amitabh Bacchan, Musharraf reportedly liked. The Hindi translation re-edited portions related to the Kargil War.

The Hindi edition, translated and printed in India, came out in early October 2006 and was sold in India for Rs 395, about one third of the English version's cost.

==== Tamil edition ====
New Horizon Media, an Indian-language publishing house based in Chennai, India, has published the Tamil translation of his book, titled உடல் மண்ணுக்கு (Udal Mannukku) (ISBN 81-8368-252-9), under its கிழக்கு பதிப்பகம (Kizhakku Pathippagam) imprint.

The Tamil edition's title was taken from the popular Tamil quote “Udal Mannukku, Uyir Thamizhukku!" (My body to the soil, my life to Tamil!) . Nagore Rumi translated the book into Tamil. B. S. Raghavan, a former Ministry of Home Affairs bureaucrat of the Government of India, released the book in Chennai during the 30th Chennai Book Fair January 10, 2007.

The Tamil version is priced at Rs. 250, about a quarter of the price of the English edition, which is sold in India for Rs. 950.

=== Urdu edition ===
An Urdu edition named Sab Se Pehle Pakistan (Pakistan Comes First) of the book was also released. It however removes the controversial comments made in the English book including that the government was paid for the capture of Taliban and al-Qaeda militants.

=== Bengali edition ===
A Bengali translated version of the book titled as same as the English (transliterated) was published in Bangladesh.

== Criticism ==
This book and its launch generated a fair amount of criticism. It was subjected to harsh reviews in India.

- Musharraf claimed that Daniel Pearl's murderer was an MI6 (British Intelligence) agent; The Pentagon however released a statement that Al-Qaeda trained, Khalid Sheikh Mohammed had confessed to the murder.
- Bhasin R.V. has authored "Musharraf's 'Skewed' Line of Fire" in 2007. The book satirically outlines flaws and "untruths" by the General in his autobiography.
- Later during an interview to the CNN, Musharraf backtracked on some of the claims mentioned in the book. To a question quoting the passage from his book ("Those who habitually accuse us of not doing enough in the war on terror should simply ask the CIA how much prize money it has paid to the Government of Pakistan."), he answered, "You know, I don't know whether this is to the Government of Pakistan. I don't think I wrote `the Government of Pakistan'."
- By penning his memoirs while still in office, Musharraf is emulating another military dictator of Pakistan, General Ayub Khan, as a strategy to sell it while in limelight. Ayub Khan wrote Friends, Not Masters while still in office. The former prime minister of Pakistan Benazir Bhutto described the memoirs as a cheap attempt to gain popularity at the cost of Pakistan's vital national interests.
- The book is believed to have been ghost written by Humayun Gauhar, the son of a Pakistani bureaucrat. Mistakes may have crept in because the editor in charge asked for rewrites to change the content and style.
- Ayaz Amir, a reputed Pakistani journalist and known for his critical views on the military's involvement in Pakistani politics, says the book is a sellout of the nation's pride for the sake of the author's personal gain. The book is seen as an embarrassment to the country rather than offering any new facts. Many media reports in Pakistan and abroad have panned the book for its inaccuracies and the attempt to portray himself as a saviour at the cost of showing Pakistan in poor light.
- The daughter of controversial Pakistani nuclear scientist AQ Khan has criticised claims made by President Pervez Musharraf in his autobiography. Khan was put under house arrest after admitting passing nuclear secrets to Iran, North Korea, and Libya. In the book, Musharraf said that Khan sent a letter to his daughter, Dina, asking her to "go public on Pakistan's nuclear secrets" through British journalists, a claim which she vehemently denied as ludicrous.
- The references of the Kargil conflict-related contents have irked many around the world, including Pakistanis. The English version of the book has left out the number of Pakistani casualties, while the Hindi version lists Pakistani casualties numbering 357. It is quoted that such remarks do little help in the ongoing dialogue between the two countries. Even Pakistani authors have panned the book for turning a defeat in Kargil into a victory. Pakistan opposition slammed the book as a "pack of lies" and a "national shame," while PML-N stated that it was the most contradicted book of any dictator. Former Pakistan PM Nawaz Sharif and foreign minister Sartaj Aziz have both blasted the book as a "plethora of lies." Daily Times of Pakistan notes that Kargil blunder would take many years to rectify.
- The version of the Kargil war was also lambasted by a fellow Pakistani Army General Lt Gen Ali Kuli Khan Khattak. In a hard hitting interview, he said that, "It was a disaster bigger than the East Pakistan tragedy," and disputed many claims that Musharaff gave in his book. The Economist has been scathing in its reviews on the book, especially on the Kargil episode stating that he has failed to mention how thousands of Pakistani fighters were "slaughtered in a humiliating retreat." It adds that contrary to his version that Kargil helped restore peace, Pakistan "was forced to the table by the drubbing it took there."

== Errors ==
Some of the factual/typographical errors in the book surfaced so far are:

- Islambad (instead of Islamabad)
- Year of Benazir Bhutto's second dismissal: 1997 (actually November 1996) – p. 162
- Census in Pakistan: 1997 (actually 1998) – p. 169
- Britain's withdrawal announcement from India April 1947 (actually June 1947) – p. 16
- Indian PM Manmohan Singh as "Manmoham Singh" in the photo captions
- Former Pakistan PM Shaukat Aziz as "Shuakat" (p. 179) and twice as "Shaukut" (cover jacket flap and p. 232)
- First mentioned final exams of FA, then later wrote FSc finals (p. 35).

== In the news ==
- All eyes on Musharraf's book - An article on the book by Royden D'Souza, NDTV
- Mush panned for book plug - News item about the book launch in Times of India by Chidanand Rajghatta
- Book makes waves in India - Dawn's report on the reactions to the book release in India.
- 'Script for a PTV docudrama' - by Wilson John in 'The Pioneer', writes that Musharraf did not tell some important things in this book
- Pen that fires - An analysis on the background of the books by Mahendra Ved
- Musharraf: Throwing dust in his own eyes - by B. Raman of the South Asia Analysis Group.
- Bush, Osama will miserably lose polls in Pakistan- News report on Musharraf in the American comedy show called The Daily Show to promote his book.
- In the line of embarrassment, an article by Ayaz Amir, a Pakistani journalist on this book.
- Military misjudgment - an article on this book in The Economist
- - Dr. Ahmad Reza Taheri on in the line of the fire.
