= I Am on the Hit List =

2024 non-fiction book

I Am on the Hit List: A Journalist's Murder and the Rise of Autocracy in India
- Author: Rollo Romig
- Language: English
- Subject: Journalism, Murder, Ideological Conflict, Indian Politics
- Genre: Non-fiction
- Publisher: Penguin Books
- Publication date: August 6, 2024
- Publication place: United States
- Media type: Print (Hardcover)
- Pages: 400
- ISBN: 978-0143135289

I Am on the Hit List: A Journalist's Murder and the Rise of Autocracy in India (Indian subtitle: Murder and Myth-making in South India) is a 2024 non-fiction book by American journalist Rollo Romig. It focuses on the 2017 murder of Indian journalist Gauri Lankesh in Bangalore and examines the political and ideological context surrounding her death. The book was published by Penguin Books on August 6, 2024.

== Background ==
Gauri Lankesh (1962–2017) was an Indian journalist and activist who edited Lankesh Patrike, a Kannada-language weekly. She was known for her criticism of Hindu nationalist groups and her advocacy for secularism and social justice. On September 5, 2017, Lankesh was shot dead outside her home in Bangalore by unidentified gunmen. Her murder led to widespread protests in India, with many linking it to her criticism of right-wing extremism. Rollo Romig, an American journalist who had lived in Bangalore, had met Lankesh during his time in India. After her murder, he returned to investigate the circumstances of her death and the broader socio-political environment in South India.

== Reception ==
The book was a 2025 Pulitzer Prize Finalist for General Nonfiction. The Pulitzer Board called it "a captivating account of a crusading South Indian’s murder, a mystery rich in local culture and politics that also connects to such global themes as authoritarianism, fundamentalism and other threats to free expression.

The book also received received positive reviews from The New York Times and The Tribune India.
