= Jai Hind Jai Sindh: A Love Story =

- Directed by: Indrajit Lankesh
- Produced by: Sammy Nanwani
- Starring: Mahesh Manjrekar; Vikram Kochhar; Indira Tiwari; Chhaya Kadam; Jaya Prada; Zarina Wahab; Rahul Dev; Amit Behl
- Production company: Sammy's Entertainment
- Country: India
- Languages: Hindi; Kannada; Tamil; Telegu

Jai Hind Jai Sindh: A Love Story is an upcoming Indian Partition-era historical drama film directed by Indrajit Lankesh and produced by Sammy Nanwani under the banner of Sammy's Entertainment. The film features an ensemble cast including Mahesh Manjrekar, Vikram Kochhar, Indira Tiwari, Chhaya Kadam, Jaya Prada, and Zarina Wahab.

== Premise ==
Set against the backdrop of the Partition of India in 1947, the film explores a romance rooted in patriotism and the cultural heritage of the Sindh region. It aims to showcase the beauty of undivided Sindh and the contributions of the Sindhi community to Indian history.

== Cast ==
- Mahesh Manjrekar
- Jaya Prada
- Chhaya Kadam
- Zarina Wahab
- Vikram Kochhar
- Indira Tiwari
- Rahul Dev
- Amit Behl
- Upasana Singh
- Ehsan Khan
- Pooja Katyal
- Ajit Shidhaye
- Ankith Arora
- Gauravv Dingra
- Kartikey Malviya
- Rajveer Singh
- Nanak Singh
- Akaisha Vats
- Fatima Ayesha Khan
- Garima Agarwal

== Production ==
The film was announced by the makers of the 2020 film Shakeela. A motion poster for the film was officially unveiled in March 2026 during a press conference in Dehradun.
