= Khandavideko Mamsavideko =

- Directed by: P. Lankesh
- Written by: P. Lankesh (dialogues)
- Screenplay by: Shama Saidi; Ramesh Kamath; P. Lankesh
- Story by: P. Lankesh
- Produced by: Prabhakar Reddy; P. Lankesh; B. S. Somasundar; K. S. L. Swamy (Ravi)
- Starring: Roopa; Jayamala; Suresh Heblikar; Kantharaj
- Cinematography: B. C. Gowrishankar
- Edited by: M. Umanath
- Music by: Rajeev Tharanath
- Production company: Lokeshwari Pictures
- Distributed by: Lokeshwari Pictures
- Release date: 19 January 1979
- Running time: 107 min
- Country: India
- Language: Kannada

Khandavideko Mamsavideko is a 1979 Indian Kannada film, directed by P. Lankesh and produced by Prabhakar Reddy, P. Lankesh, B. S. Somasundar and K. S. L. Swamy (Ravi). The film stars Jayamala, Suresh Heblikar and Roopa Chakravarthi in lead roles. The film had musical score by Rajeev Tharanath.

== Cast ==
- Jayamala
- Suresh Heblikar
- Roopa Chakravarthi
- Gangadhar
- Sarvamangala
