= Rajarajeshwari Nagar, Bengaluru =

Rajarajeshwari Nagar
- Suburb
- Rajarajeshwari Nagara
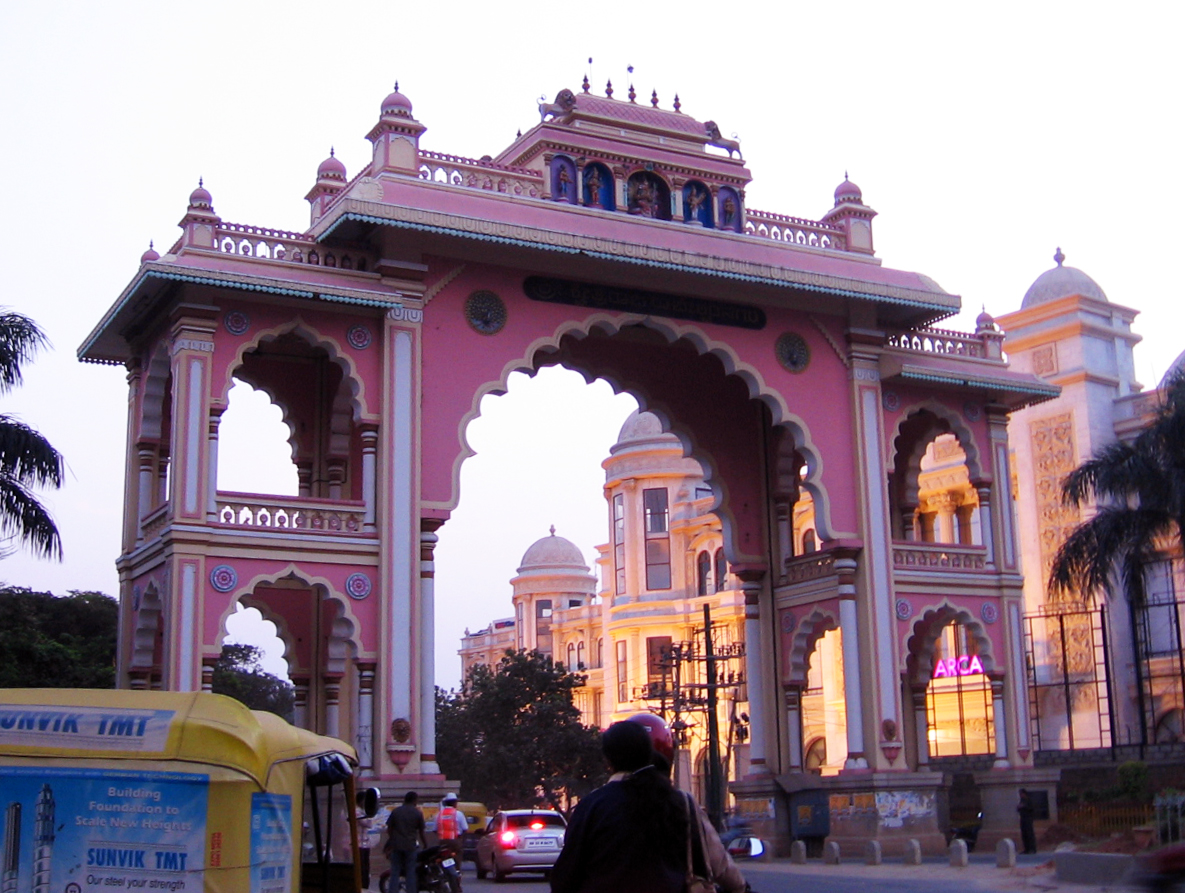
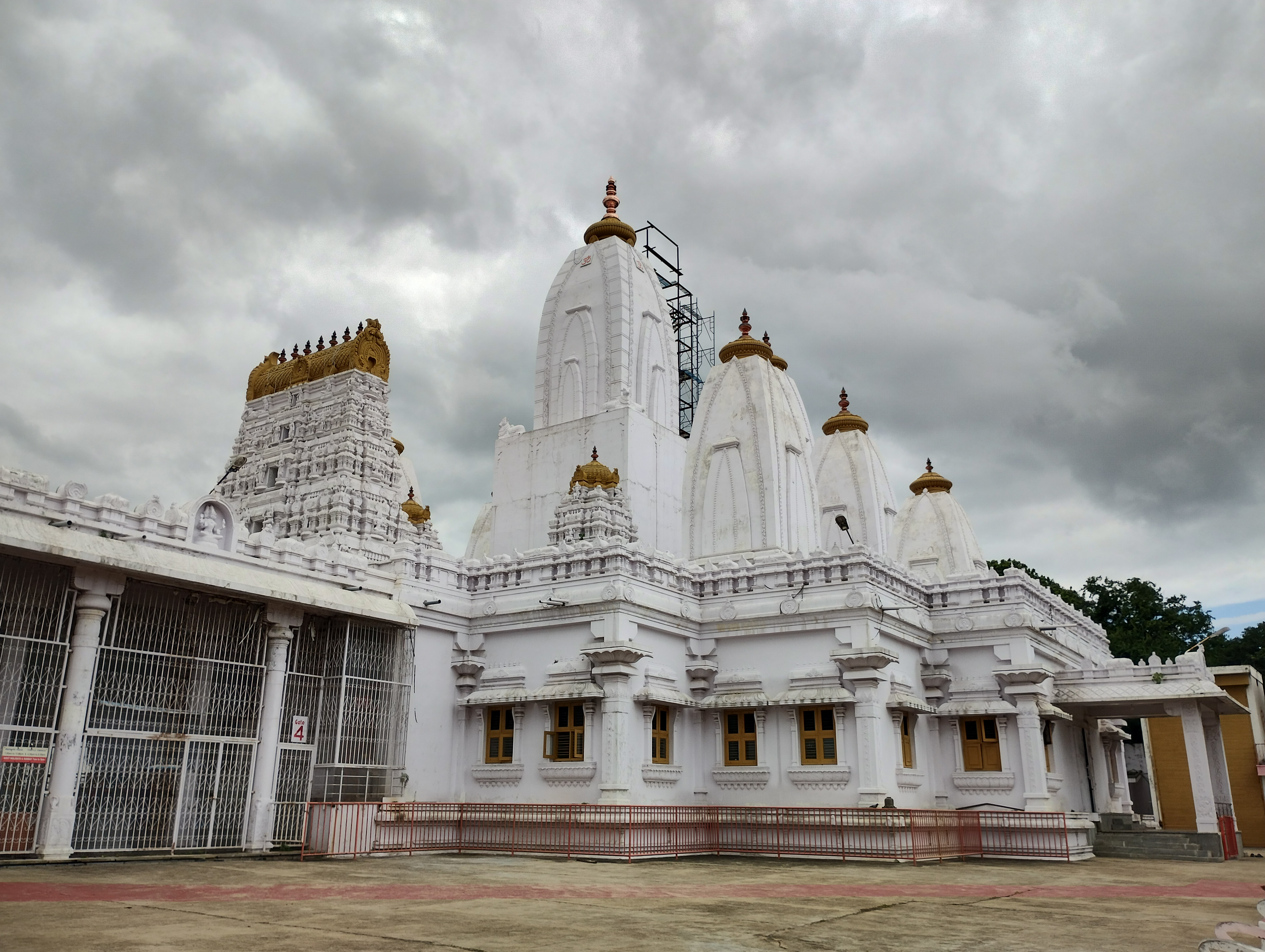
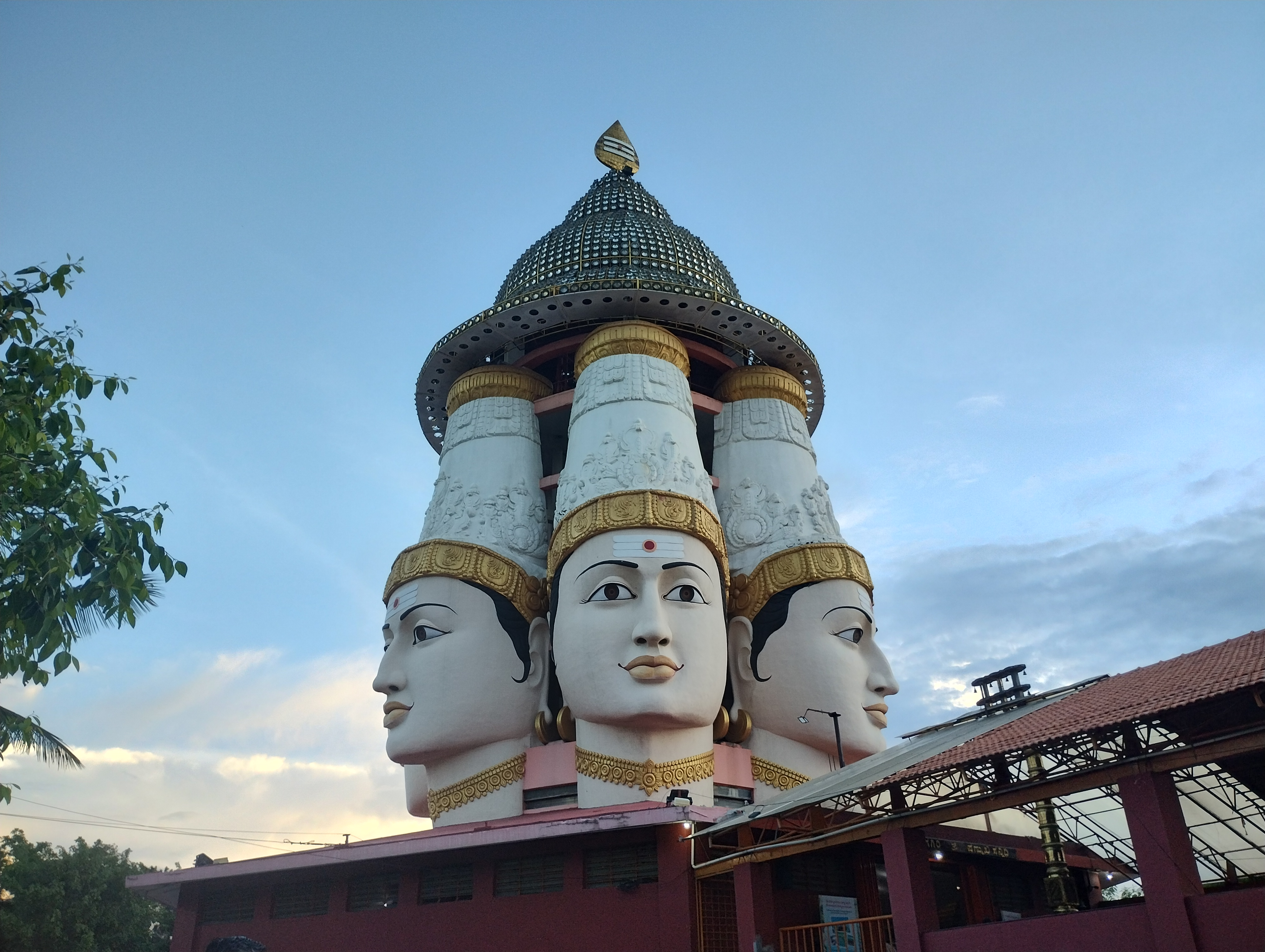
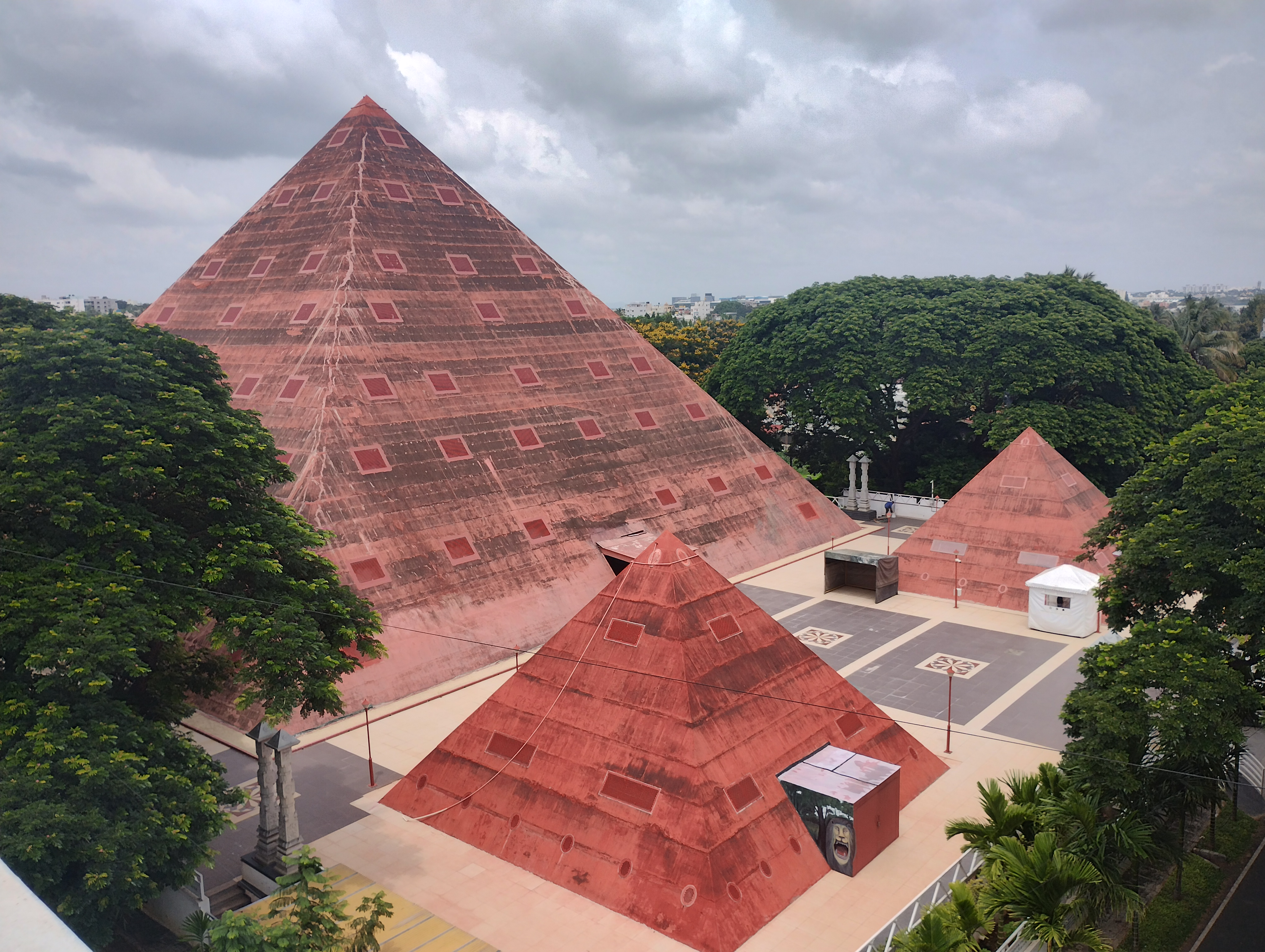
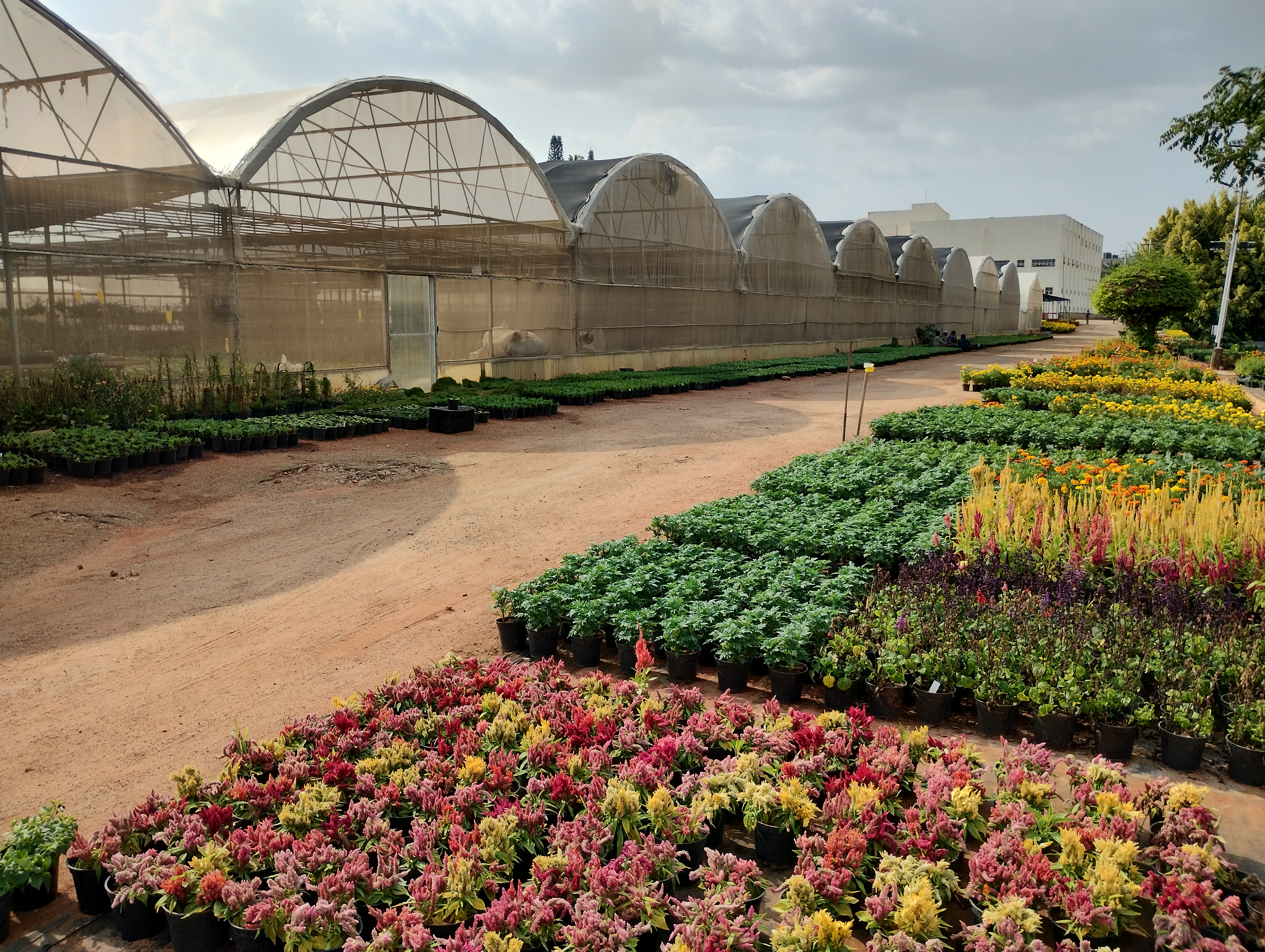
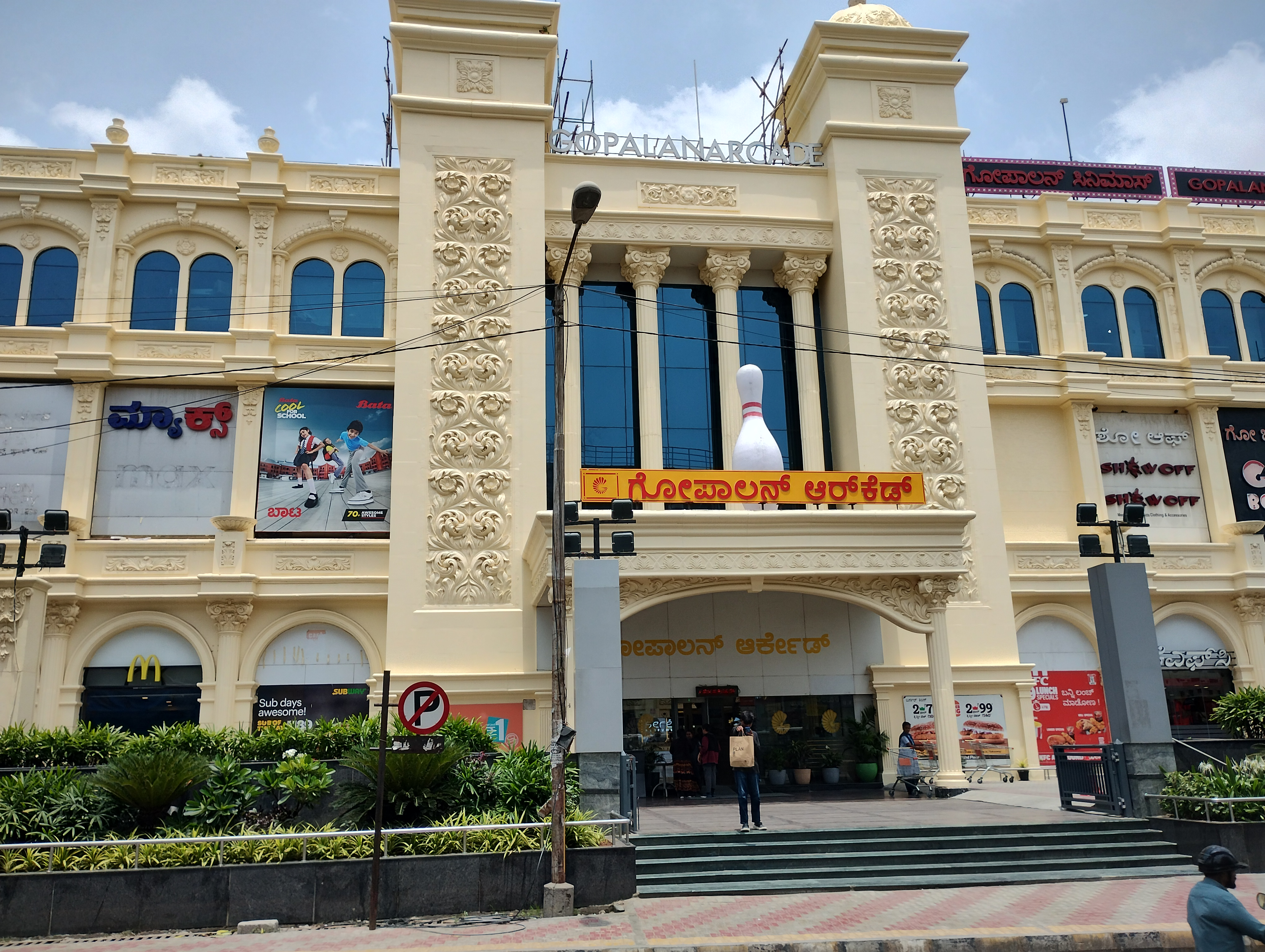
- Arch at the entrance of Rajarajeshwari Nagar Dwadasha Jyotirlinga Temple Shrungagiri Sri Shanmukha Swamy Temple Sri Shivaratnapuri Temple of Health Indo American Hybrid Seeds Gopalan Arcade Mall

- Location within Bengaluru Location within Karnataka Location within India
- Coordinates: 12°55′48″N 77°32′10″E
- Country: India
- State: Karnataka
- District: Bengaluru Urban
- Ward: 160

Population (2011)
  - Total: 56,897

Kannada
  - Official: Kannada
- Time zone: UTC+5:30 (IST)
- PIN: 560098
- Lok Sabha constituency: Bangalore Rural
- Vidhan Sabha constituency: Rajarajeshwari Nagar

Rajarajeshwari Nagar, commonly referred to as RR Nagar, is a western suburb of Bengaluru, Karnataka, India. It is located in the southwestern part of Bengaluru along the Mysore Road, with Nagarbhavi and the Bangalore University to the north and north-west, Hosakerehalli to the east and Kengeri to the south-west. There is a prominent arch-shaped structure on Mysore Road which serves as the most popular entrance to this locality.

In historical texts this region was known as Kalyananagari, lies on the east–west meridian of Karnataka, which is situated in the southwest between the Kaveri and Vrishabhavati rivers. This place is considered the "ear" or "karnabhaga" of the several Shaktipeethas, according to the Tantra Chudamani. Tiruchi Swamigal laid the foundation stone for the Jnanakshi Rajarajeshwari Temple in early 1960.

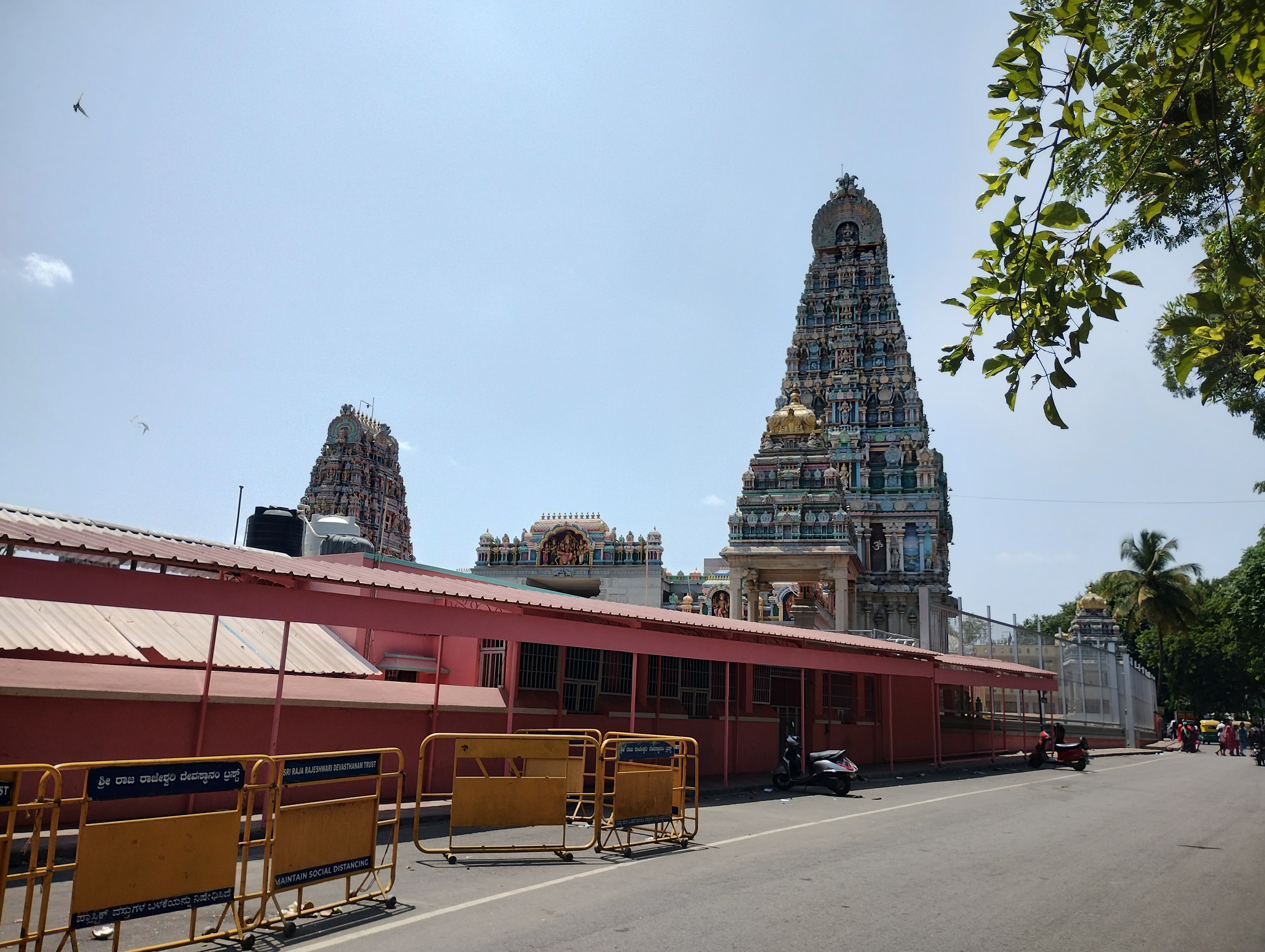
Rajarajeshwari Temple, in 2024

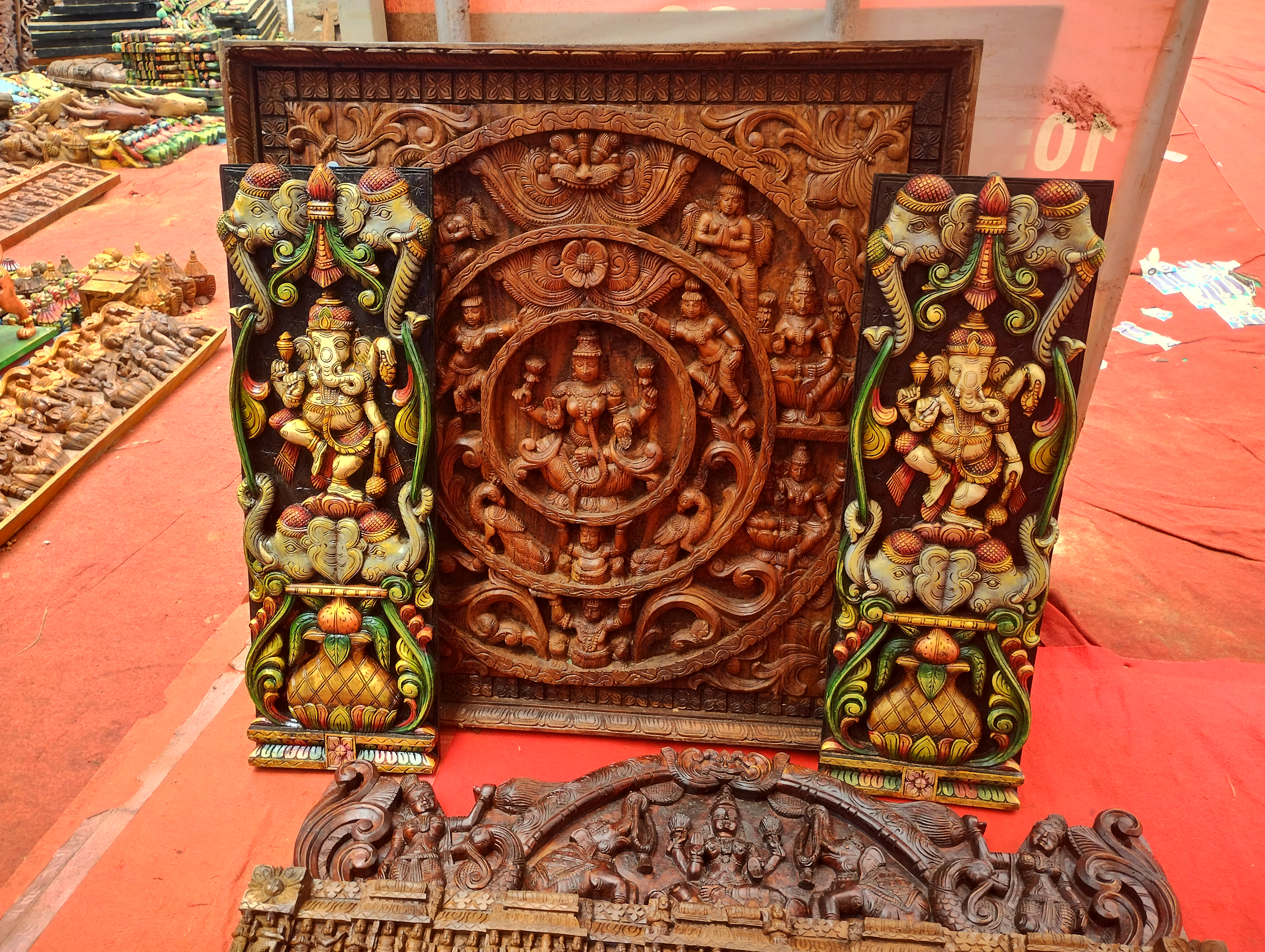
Art exhibitions in RR Nagar

== Culture ==
The Karnataka Chitrakala Parishath was set to open a 14-acre campus in Rajarajeshwari Nagar by 2020.

The Global Academy of Technology is located in RR Nagar.

The neighbourhood is known for its vigilance against garbage dumping. Residents of the locality have formed a volunteer group called "Swachh RR Nagar" to clear garbage from public places in the area. In 2019, BBMP installed CCTV cameras in the locality to monitor and curb garbage dumping.

== Notable residents ==
- Darshan
- Ganesh
- Rakshit Shetty
- Diganth
- Amulya
- Duniya Vijay
- Avinash
- Malavika Avinash
- Indrajith Lankesh
- B. Jayashree
- Rachita Ram
- Krishi Thapanda
- Nivedita Jain
- Gauri Lankesh
- Siddalingaiah
