= P. Lankesh =

Indian film director and writer (1935–2000)

- Born: Palyada Lankeshappa; 8 March 1935; Konagavalli, Shimoga, Karnataka, India
- Died: 25 January 2000 (aged 64); Bangalore, Karnataka, India
- Occupations: Writer; editor; filmmaker; poet; playwright; teacher
- Notable work: Kereya Nerannu Kerege Chelli (1960); Mussanjeya Katha Prasanga (1978); Kallu Karaguva Samaya (1990)
- Spouse: Indira Lankesh
- Children: Gauri Lankesh, Kavitha Lankesh, Indrajit Lankesh
- Awards: National Film Award for Best Direction: 1976; Sahitya Akademi Award: 1993

Palya Lankesh (8 March 1935 – 25 January 2000) was an Indian poet, fiction writer, playwright, translator, screenplay writer and journalist who wrote in Kannada. He was also a film director.

== Early life and education ==
Lankesh was born in Konagavalli, Shimoga, Karnataka. After graduating with a degree in English from Central College in Bengaluru, Lankesh completed a Master of Arts degree in English at Maharaja's College, Mysore.

== Work ==
His 1976 film Pallavi, a cinematic narration, told from the female protagonist's point of view and based on his novel Biruku, won the National Award for Best Direction (Swarna Kamal). Lankesh quit his job as an assistant professor in English at Bangalore University in 1980 and started Lankesh Patrike, the first Kannada tabloid, which influenced Kannada culture and politics.

Lankesh's first work was the collection of short stories Kereya Neeranu Kerege Chelli (1963). His other works include the novels Biruku ("The Fissure"), Mussanjeya Kathaprasanga (A Story at Dusk), Akka (Sister); the plays T. Prasannana Grihastashrama ("The Householder-hood of T.Prasanna"), Sankranti ("Revolution"), Nanna Tangigondu Gandu Kodi ("A Groom for my Sister") and Gunamukha ("Convalescence"); the short story collections, Umapatiya Scholarship Yatre ("Umapati's Scholarship Trip"), Kallu Karaguva Samaya (When the Stone Melts; winner of the 1993 Sahitya Akademi Award), Paapada Hoogalu, the translation of Charles Baudelaire's Les Fleurs du Mal and Dore Oedipus mattu Antigone, translation of Sophocles' Antigone and Oedipus Rex.

== Lankesh Patrike ==
Lankesh was the Editor of Lankesh Patrike from 1980 until his death in 2000. A socialist and Lohiaite, he was known for his secular, anti-caste and anti-Hindutva views. Before starting Lankesh Patrike, he and friends Tejaswi and K.Ramadas had toured the length and breadth of Karnataka, mobilising people to vote for their new socialist party Karnataka Pragatiranga Vedike This trip, he recounted in one of his editorials, which took him to the remotest parts of Karnataka opened his eyes to the plight of the poor, the Dalits and the Muslims and made him realise his responsibility as a writer and an intellectual towards the society.
Lankesh Patrike was significant that It had no Advertisements. Outsourcing the printing to BS Mani of Sanjevani Kannada Daily, his unique thought was His Weekly Magazine must cost as much One Idli, One Vade & One Coffee. Lankesh built a new crop of reporters, writers and freelancers, many of whom would go to set-up their own magazines.

After his death Lankesh Patrike was split into two, one edited by his daughter Gauri Lankesh and the other managed by his son Indrajit Lankesh. Lankesh's other daughter is the film director Kavita Lankesh. Lankesh Patrike, as the first Kannada tabloid, had a huge impact on Karnataka politics and culture. It led to the setting up of other tabloids like Hai Bangalore and Agni which concentrated more on crime and political scandals.

== Death ==
Lankesh died of a heart attack on 25 January 2000, aged 64.

17 years later, his daughter Gauri Lankesh was murdered in front of her residence in south Bengaluru as she arrived home by three unidentified gunmen. No motive has been found.

== Awards ==
- National Award for Best Direction for Pallavi. (1976)
- Sahitya Akademi Award for Kallu Karaguva Samaya Mattu Ithara Kathegalu (1993).
- Karnataka Sahitya Akademi Honorary Award (1986).
- B.H. Shridhara Prashasti.
- Karnataka Rajya Nataka Akademi Prashasti.
- Aryabhata Sahitya Prashasti.
- Filmfare Award for Best Film – Kannada for Ellindalo Bandavaru - 1980

== Bibliography ==
Only two of his books are available in English translation, When Stone Melts and Other Stories (translation of Kallu Karaguva Samaya) and Sankranti. His works have also been translated into Tamil and Hindi.

=== Collection of short stories ===
- Kereya Nirannu Kerege Chelli Mattu Ithara Kathegalu (1963).
- Nanalla Mattu Ithara Kathegalu (1970).
- Umapathiya Scholarship Yatre Mattu Ithara Kathegalu (1973).
- Kallu Karaguva Samaya Mattu Ithara Kathegalu (1990) (Sahitya Akademi Award for 1993).
- Ullanghane Mattu Ithara Kathegalu" (1996).
- Manju Kavida Sanje Mattu Ithara Kathegalu (2001).

=== Novels ===
- Biruku (1967).
- Mussanjeya Katha Prasanga (1978).
- Akka (1991).

=== Plays ===
- T. Prasannana Gruhasthashrama (1962).
- Nanna Thangigondu Gandu Kodi (1963).
- ಪೊಲೀಸರಿದ್ದಾರೆ, Eccharike! (1964).
- Teregalu (1964).
- Kranti Banthu, Karanti (1965).
- Giliyu Panjaradolilla (1966).
- Siddhate (1970).
- Biruku (1973).
- Sankranti (1971).
- Gunamukha (1993).

=== Translated plays ===
- ದೊರೆ Oedipus (Oedipus Rex) (1971).
- Anthigone (1971).

=== Collection of poems ===
- Bichchu (1965).
- Talemaaru (1973).
- Akshara Hosa Kavya (Collected and Edited) (1970).
- Paapada Hoogalu (1974) (a translation of Charles Baudelaire's Les Fleurs du Mal).
- Chitra Samooha (1999) [Collection of Complete Poems].
- "Avva" [Mother]

=== Autobiography ===
- Hulimavina Mara (1997).

=== Critical and other essay collections ===
- Prasthutha (1970).
- Kandaddu Kanda Haage (1975).
- Teeke-Tippani, volumes 1 and 2 (1997).
- Teeke-Tippani, volume 3 (1998).

=== Posthumous publications ===
- Neela Kavya (vols 1, 2, and 3) (2007, 2009, 2010).
- Sahiti Sahitya Vimarshe (2008).
- Mareyuva munna collected vol 1 (2009).
- Mareyuva munna collected vol 2 (2010).
- "Bittu Hoda Putagalu - 1".
- "Bittu Hoda Putagalu - 2".
- "Bittu Hoda Putagalu - 3".

== Filmography ==
- Pallavi (National Film Award for Best Direction, 1976).
- Anuroopa (1978).
- Khandavide Ko Maamsavide Ko (1979).
- Ellindalo Bandavaru (1980).
