= Monalisa (film) =

- DVD cover
- Directed by: Indrajit Lankesh
- Written by: Indrajit Lankesh; B. A. Madhu (dialogues)
- Produced by: K. S. Dushyanth; K. Santhosh Kumar
- Starring: Dhyan; Sadha
- Cinematography: Krishna Kumar
- Edited by: B. S. Kemparaj
- Music by: Valisha-Sandeep
- Production company: Lankesh Chitralaya
- Release date: 7 May 2004
- Running time: 144 minutes
- Country: India
- Language: Kannada

Monalisa is a 2004 Indian Kannada-language romance film written and directed by Indrajit Lankesh. The film stars Dhyan and Sadha in lead roles. Its storyline is inspired by the Tamil Movie Parthiban Kanavu (2003).

The film was a blockbuster upon release and also received critical appreciation. It went on to win awards at the Karnataka State Film Awards for the year 2004. It was also dubbed into Telugu with the same title later that year with a reshot comedy track with Brahmanandam and Kovai Sarala.

== Plot ==
Dhyan is driving a car in the middle of the night. He meets with an accident. Six months ago he was a college student filled with mischief and without any serious goals in life. After Dhyan's graduation, his parents decide to have him marry. He tells that his expectations are different from what the marriage broker would suggest. After some failed bride seeing ceremonies, Dhyan tells that he would find a life partner himself.

One day Dhyan meets Monalisa, a doctor, who perfectly match his taste. She says that she wants to spend a day with him to understand him. On that day, Monalisa pranks Dhyan in various ways. Dhyan eventually realises that Monalisa was just playing with him without any serious intentions. He too pranks her and asks her why she did this to him. Monalisa tells that he is just a degree holder yet expects many qualities in a girl, he goes to prospective bride's houses and reject them. This was not liked by her. To this, Dhyan says that even if he is just a degree holder, he did have the rights to have a dream girl which softens Monalisa's heart for Dhyan.

After saving Monalisa's life from the goons and other incidents, both fall in love with each other. When Dhyan was supposed to introduce Monalisa to his mother, she gets a call to return to America as her father had a minor cardiac arrest. On her way to the airport, Monalisa dies. Lost in Monalisa's thoughts while driving, Dhyan too meets with an accident. This where the present begins.

Dhyan is saved by his friends. After seeing the condition of Dhyan, his mother experiences an asthma attack and is hospitalized. She convinces him for marriage. Dhyan who has not looked at his bride so far, sees her after tying the knot. He is shocked as his bride looks exactly like Monalisa but she is Spandana. During their honeymoon, Dhyan tells Spandana that he loved a girl, who later died in an accident. He requests her to give some time for him to accept this relationship. Spandana is shattered.

Noticing that the new couple are not behaving like one, Dhyan's parents decide to stay at their daughter's in America in the name of her delicate pregnancy. Dhyan who was always depended on his mother, now has to stay with Spandana and she has to cater to Dhyan's needs.

One day, the goons who had previously been beaten up by Dhyan, come and attempt to kill him. After being rescued, Spandana takes good care of him. During Dhyan's recovery, Spandana and him happen to consummate their marriage without Dhyan's awareness. After Dhyan's recovery, he finds out Spandana is pregnant. He feels that Spandana had used him when he was weak. But his conscience tells him how she endured all the pain he gave her when she had dreams as a new bride, how he treated her all these days and also how she cared for him all alone after the accident.

Having a change of heart, Dhyan begins to care for Spandana, bring her all the nutritious food, etc. Slowly he accepts her and is going to propose her. When he was about to express his feelings for Spandana, Dhyan sees Monalisa and is taken aback. He meets Monalisa and asks her why she faked her own death. Monalisa tells that her father had faked his cardiac arrest to make her return America and have he marry the one they liked. Her passport, mobile phone and other documents were all snatched away from her. When she escaped and came to Dhyan, he had already tied the knot. Seeing this, she distanced herself from Dhyan so that he would not leave the innocent Spandana.

Eventually, Spandana realises Monalisa's existence. Spandana tells Monalisa that she is ready to give up her husband so that he is happy to which Monalisa disagrees. Spandana is firm in her decision and goes to stay at her father's. Upon learning the truth about Dhyan and Monalisa, Spandana's father hire goons to kill Monalisa so that his daughter could live happily with her husband. Upon learning this, Spandana runs to help Monalisa.

Monalisa was leaving for America and Dhyan was going to drop her at the airport. Both are stopped by the goons. Dhyan fights with the goons. Unfortunately Spandana is stabbed in an attempt to rescue Monalisa and tells them everything. She undergoes labour pain and with Monalisa's assistance gives birth to a baby there. After a few days, it is seen that Spandana and Dhyan are happy with their child.

== Cast ==
- Dhyan as Dhyan
- Sadha as Monalisa and Spandana
- Vanitha Vasu as Monalisa's mother
- Akhila as Malleshwari "Malli"
- Ramakrishna as Dhyan's father
- Bhavya as Sarasu, Dhyan's mother
- Umashree as a marriage broker
- Shakeela as the college principal
- Sharan as Sharan, Dhyan's friend
- Rangayana Raghu as ACP Raveendra
- R. G. Vijayasarathy as Malleshwari's father
- Hari as the doctor
- Vijay as Dhyan's classmate

=== Telugu version ===
- Brahmanandam as Dr. Thikkavar Thikkamaka Reddy M.B.B.S.
- Kovai Sarala as the nurse

=== Guest appearances ===
- Darshan in the song "Chori Chori"
- Rekha Vedavyas in the song "Car Car Huduga"
- Durga Shetty in the song "Chori Chori"
- Ruchita Prasad as an alcoholic prospective bride
- Indrajit Lankesh in the song "Car Car Huduga"

== Production ==
"Up until Monalisa, I was always cast in typical village girl roles. Now in this role, I was playing this hotshot girl with a pixie cut and stylish outfits. The film was my grand entrance into Kannada cinema."

— Sadha on her character, 2024

The film is produced by Dushyanth, the leader of the Karnataka Youth Congress. Sadha made her Kannada debut with this film. Babji of the Babji-Sandeep music duo changed his name to Valisha. Bhavya, who played Dhyan's mother in Nanna Preethiya Hudugi (2001), plays the same role in this film. The film was shot in Bangalore. The song "Nannusiru Neene" was shot in Thailand.

== Themes and influences ==
A man who falls in love with a woman that is a duplicate of his previous lover was the main plotline of Parthiban Kanavu (2003). The second half of the film, apart from the climax, where Dhyan (Dhyan) fails to be a responsible husband is similar to Eradu Kanasu (1974) where Ramu (Dr. Rajkumar) fails to lead a normal married life.

== Soundtrack ==
The music of the film was composed by Valisha-Sandeep duo. The song "Chori Chori" is inspired from "Habibi Dah (Nari Narain)", which was sung by Hisham Abbas and Bombay Jayashri.

Track listing
No.	Title	Lyrics	Singer(s)	Length
1.	"Chori Chori"	K. Kalyan	Shankar Mahadevan, Kalpana
2.	"Car Car Huduga"	V. Nagendra Prasad	Vasundhara Das, Karthik
3.	"Oh Priyathame"	K. Kalyan	Rajesh Krishnan
4.	"Nannusiru Neene"	Doddarangegowda	K. S. Chithra
5.	"Ee Manasella Neene"	K. Kalyan	Rajesh Krishnan, Shreya Ghoshal
6.	"Monalisa Monalisa"	Nagendra Prasad	Sonu Nigam, K. S. Chithra

== Release and reception ==
The film was the first Kannada film to release in a multiplex.

A critic from Deccan Herald wrote that "The director has put in a good effort to make the film a mass entertainer through comedy, romance, sentiment and action sequences. The first part is full of comedy and romantic scenes.The narration has a touch of freshness". A critic from Viggy.com wrote that "Technically, Monalisa is a good movie. Indrajith has cooked the food with right ingredients that is apt for commercial film - is a magnet for young crowd". A critic from indiainfo.com wrote that "Like always Indrajeet Lankesh has placed importance on the story. The story gives a firm foundation to the film. Sometimes it gives you a feeling that we have heard this story before. Yet the story telling style and the screenplay is superb".

Regarding the Telugu dubbed version, Jeevi of Idlebrain.com rated the film 2 1/4 out of 5 and wrote that "Songs, comedy and stunt sequences act more like speed-breakers to the narration of the story than catalysts of entertainment".

== Box office ==
The film was a box office success and ran for a hundred days.

== Awards ==
Event	Category	Recipient	Ref.
2004–05 Karnataka State Film Awards	First Best Film	K. S. Dushyanth, K. Santosh Kumar	
2004–05 Karnataka State Film Awards	Best Director	Indrajit Lankesh	
