= Jnanakshi Rajarajeshwari Temple =

Hindu temple in Bengaluru, India

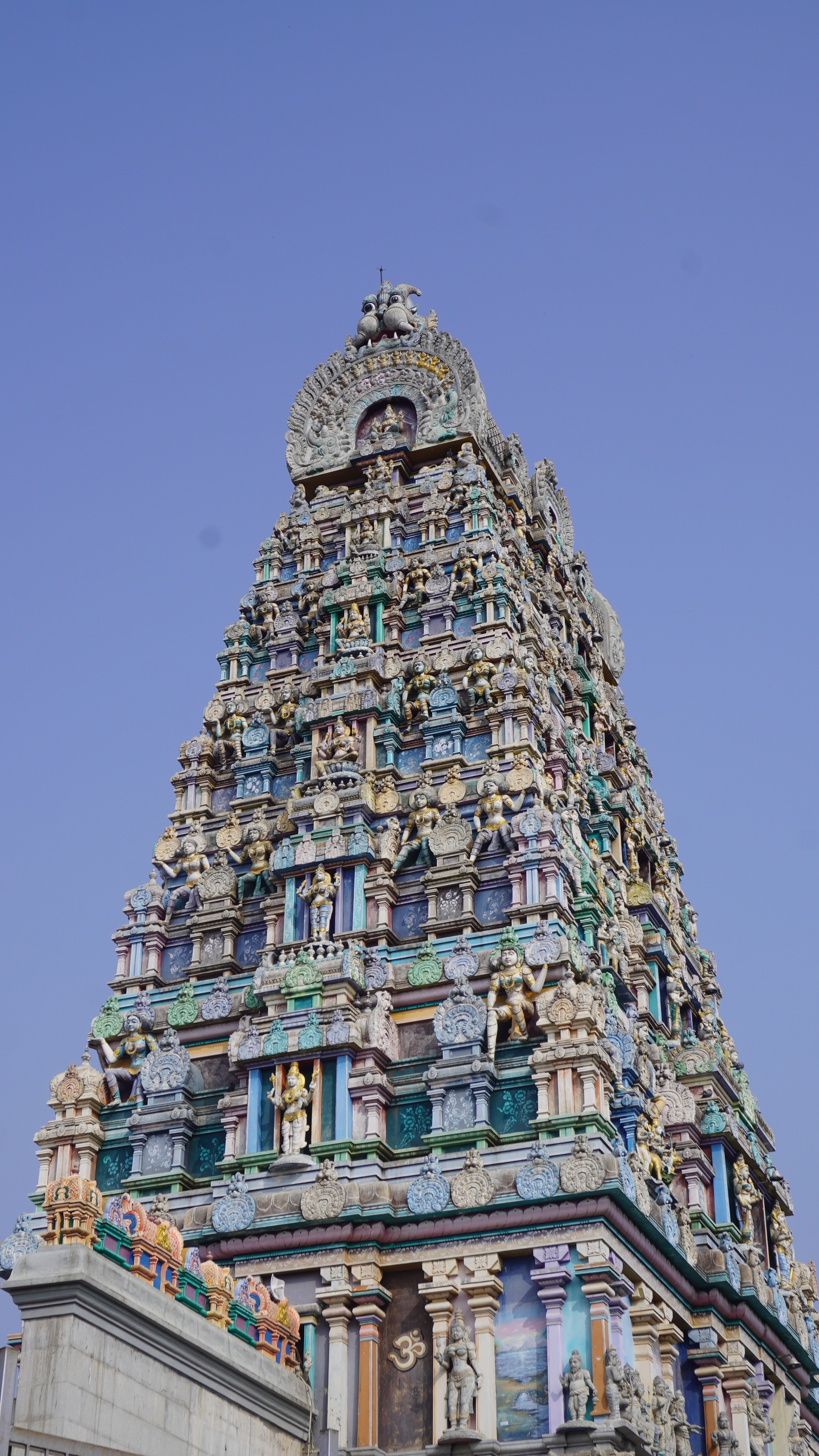

- Location within Bengaluru

Religion
- Affiliation: Hinduism
- District: Bengaluru Urban
- Deity: Rajarajeshwari
- Festivals: Navaratri, Makara Sankranti, Deepavali

Location
- Location: Rajarajeshwari Nagar
- State: Karnataka
- Country: India
- Coordinates: 12°55′48″N 77°32′10″E

Architecture
- Type: Dravidian architecture
- Completed: 1978

Website
- https://rajarajeshwari.in/home/home

Jnanakshi Rajarajeshwari Temple is a Hindu temple in Rajarajeshwari Nagar, Bangalore, Karnataka, India. The primary deity of the temple is Rajarajeshwari. The temple was built in 1978. The idol Rajarajeshwari, a form of the Hindu goddess Tripura Sundari. This temple is believed to be the "ear" or 'ckarnabhag'c of India's Shaktipeethas as mentioned in the Tantra Chudamani. The temple area is situated between the Kaveri and Vrishabhavati rivers. The ruling Bhairava, Abiru Bhairava, is known as Jaya Peetha. The temple is believed to have been the home of the pious wife Anusuya and the sage Atri, who attained siddhi by appeasing Rajarajeshwari. The temple grounds are believed to be a sacred place for various devas, rishis, munis, and siddhas.

Sivaratnapuri Swamiji, established Sri Kailash Ashrama Mahasamsthana in Kenchenahalli, later known as Rajarajeshwarinagar.

== Music ==
In 2024, a raga composed by Mahesh Mahadev entitled "Sri Jnanakshija" was dedicated to the temple's presiding deity.

The raga was performed on the album Jnanakshi Rajarajeshwari, which includes vocal performances by Priyadarshini, Mahesh Mahadev and others.

== Gallery ==
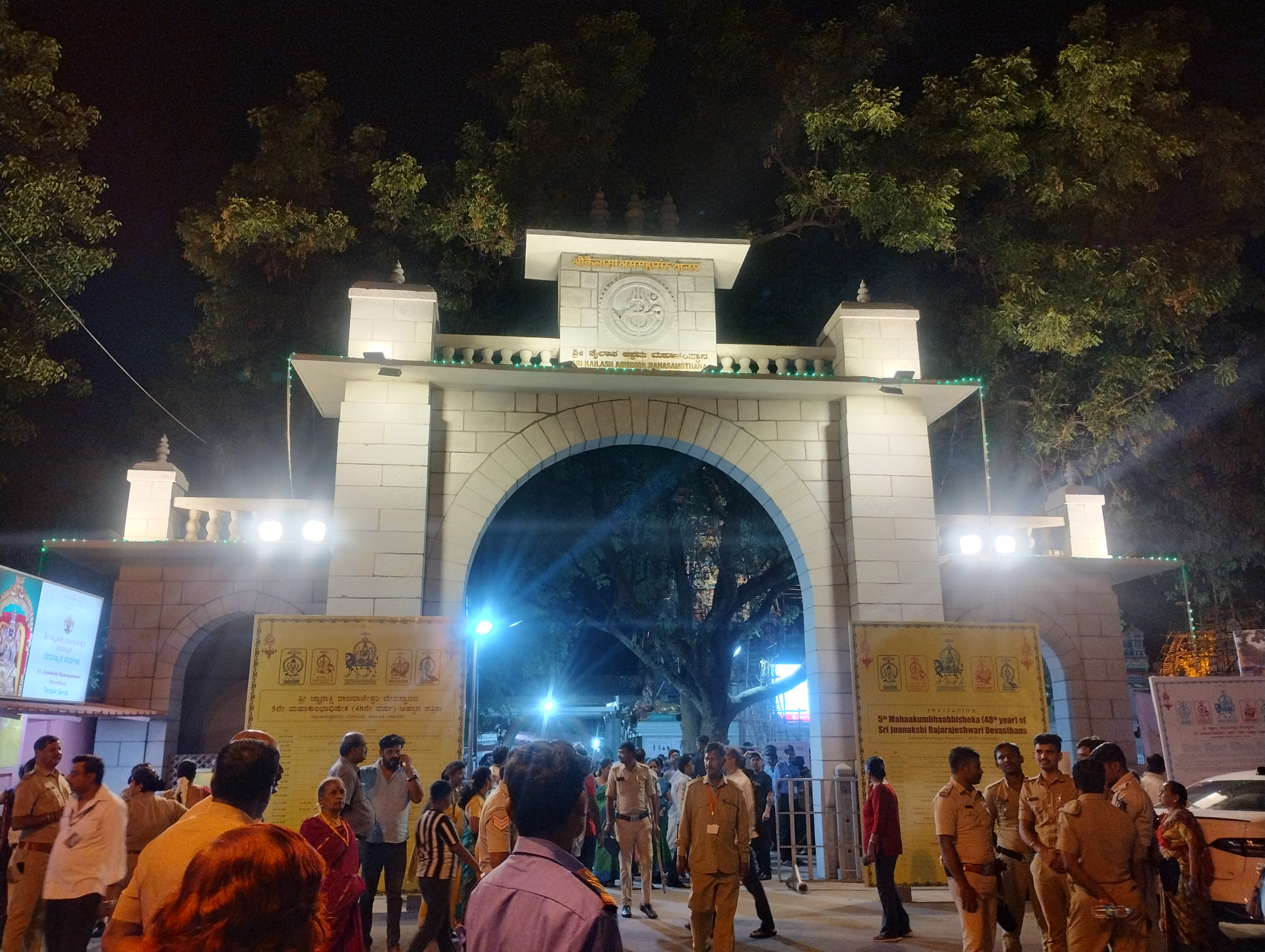
Entrance arch

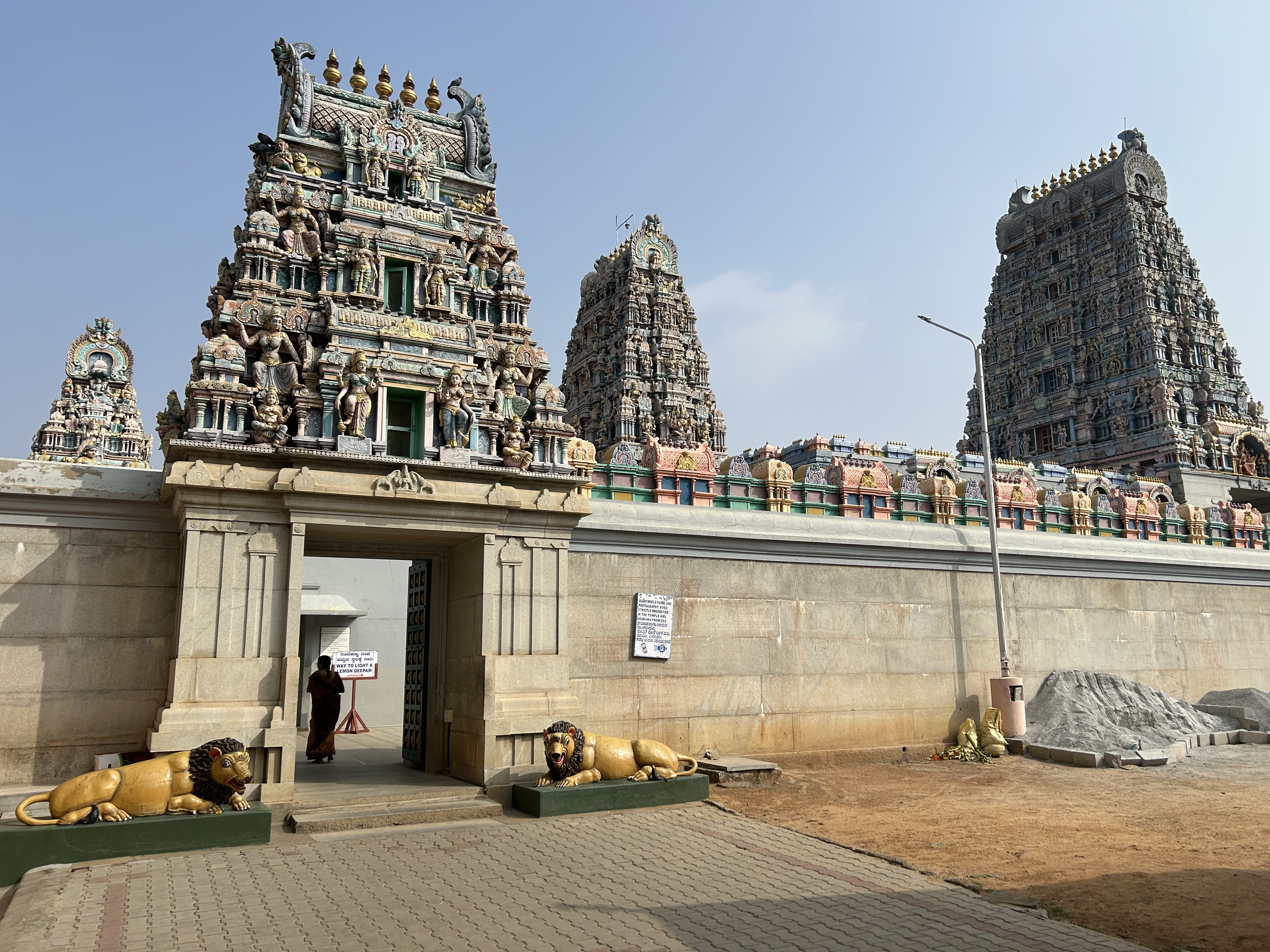
Sri Rajarajeshwari temple from outside

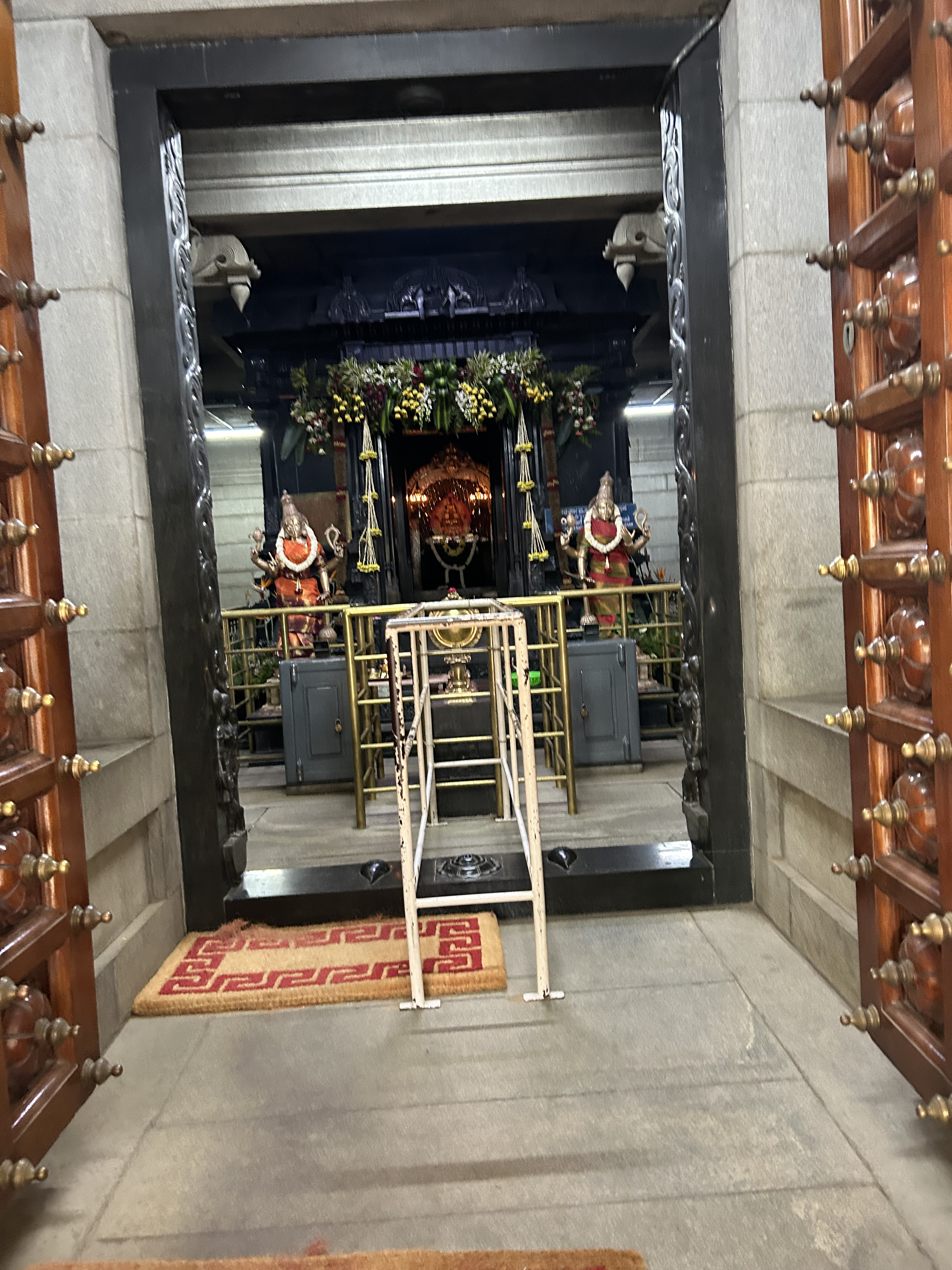
Srichakra Maha Meru temple

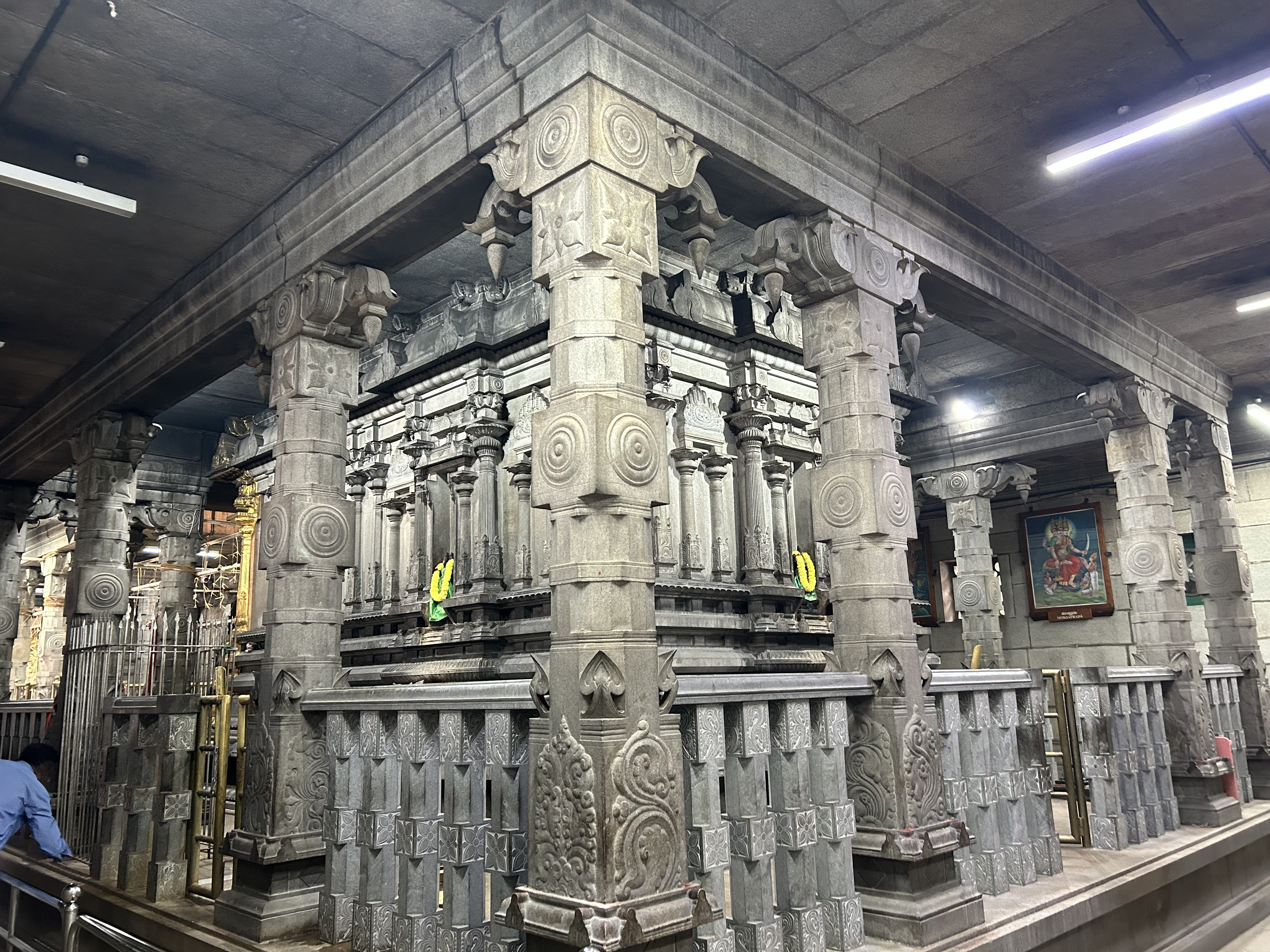
Inner view of Sri Rajarajeshwari temple

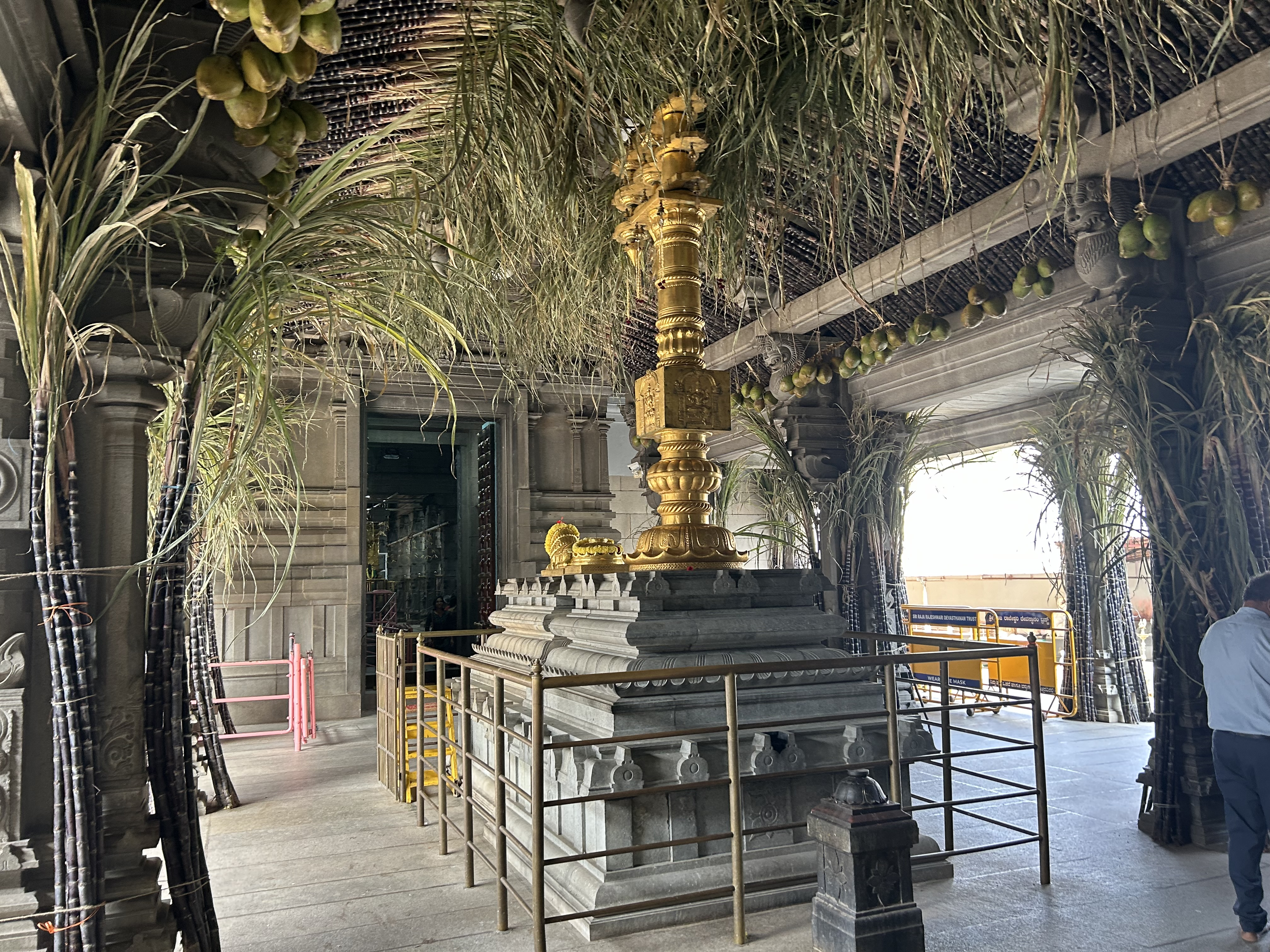
Gold Dwaja Sthamba, Sri Rajarajeshwari temple

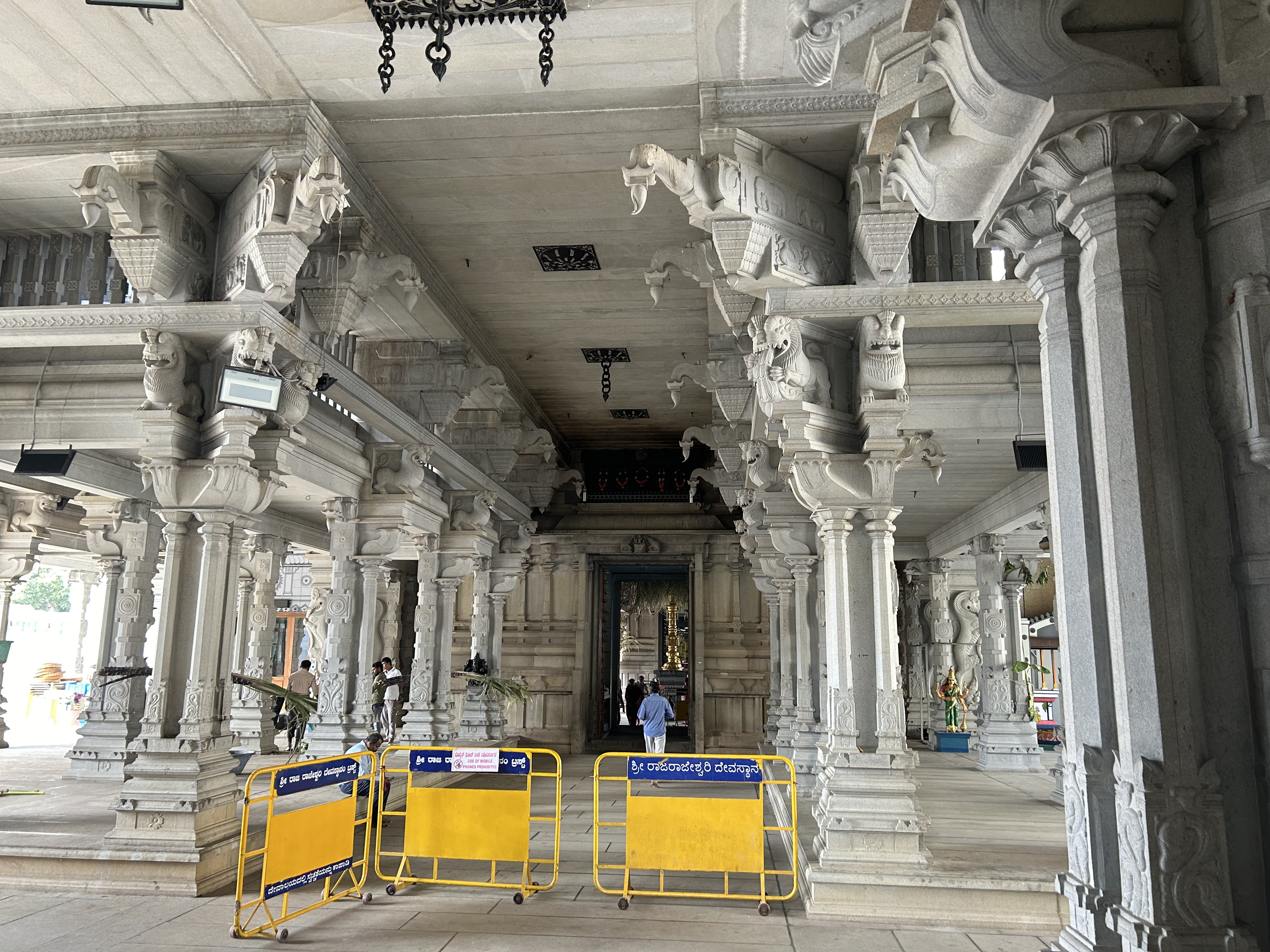
Pillars inside Sri Rajarajeshwari temple,

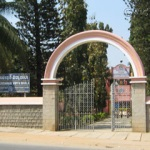
Sri Kailash ashrama

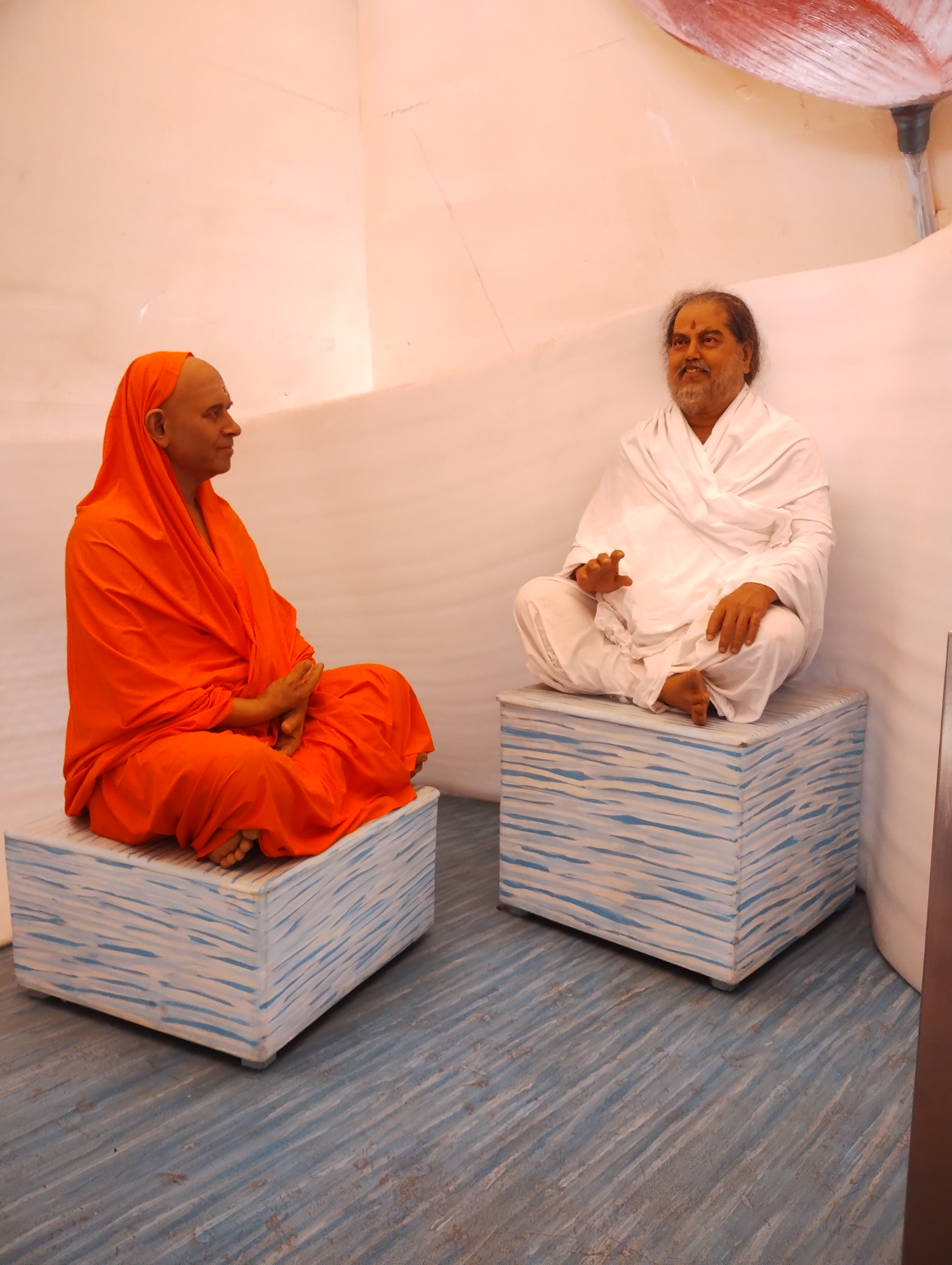
Sri Shivaratnapuri Swamiji

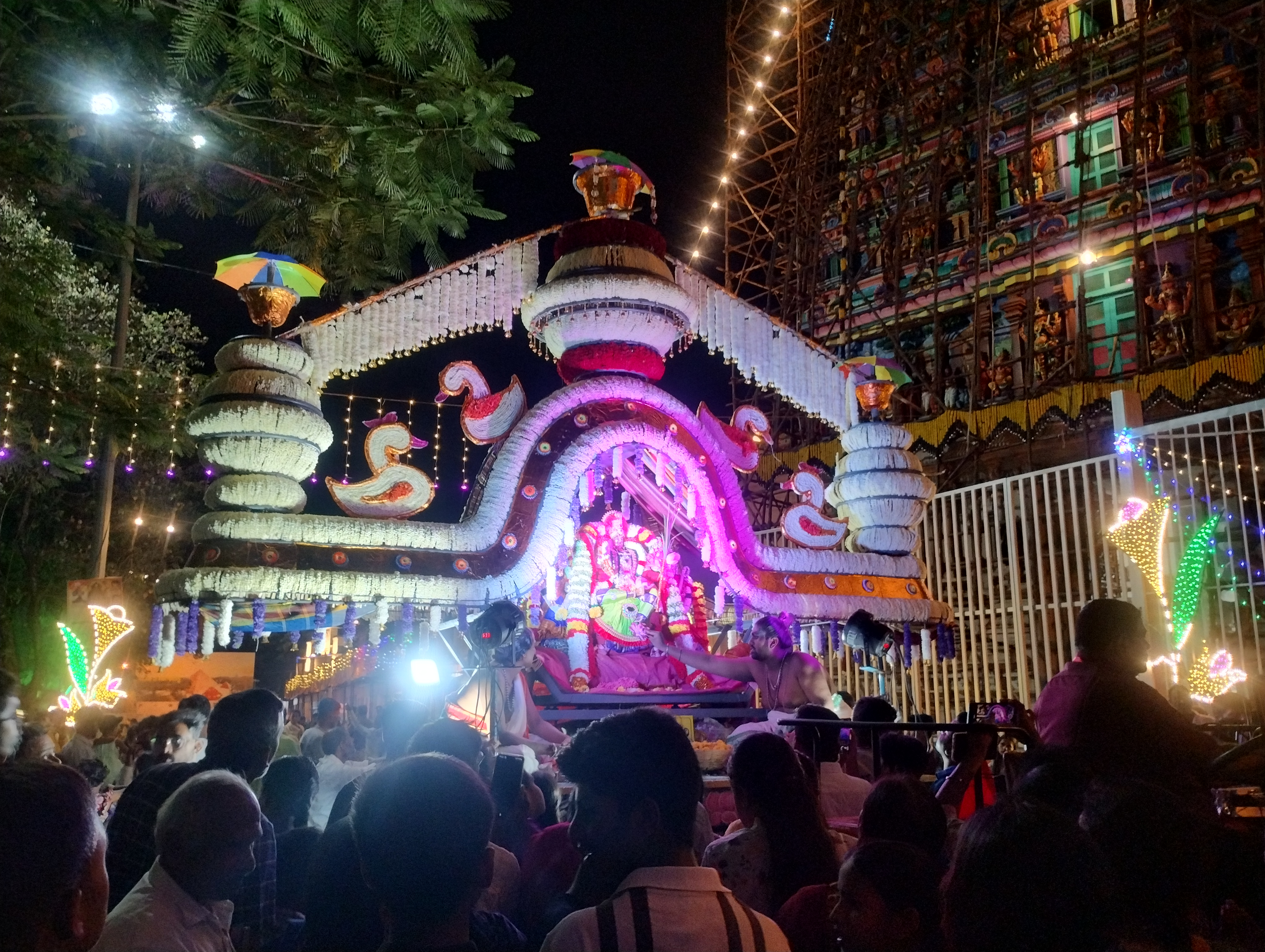
Mahaakumbhaabhisheka at the temple in 2026
