= Gauri Lankesh =

Indian activist and journalist (1962–2017)

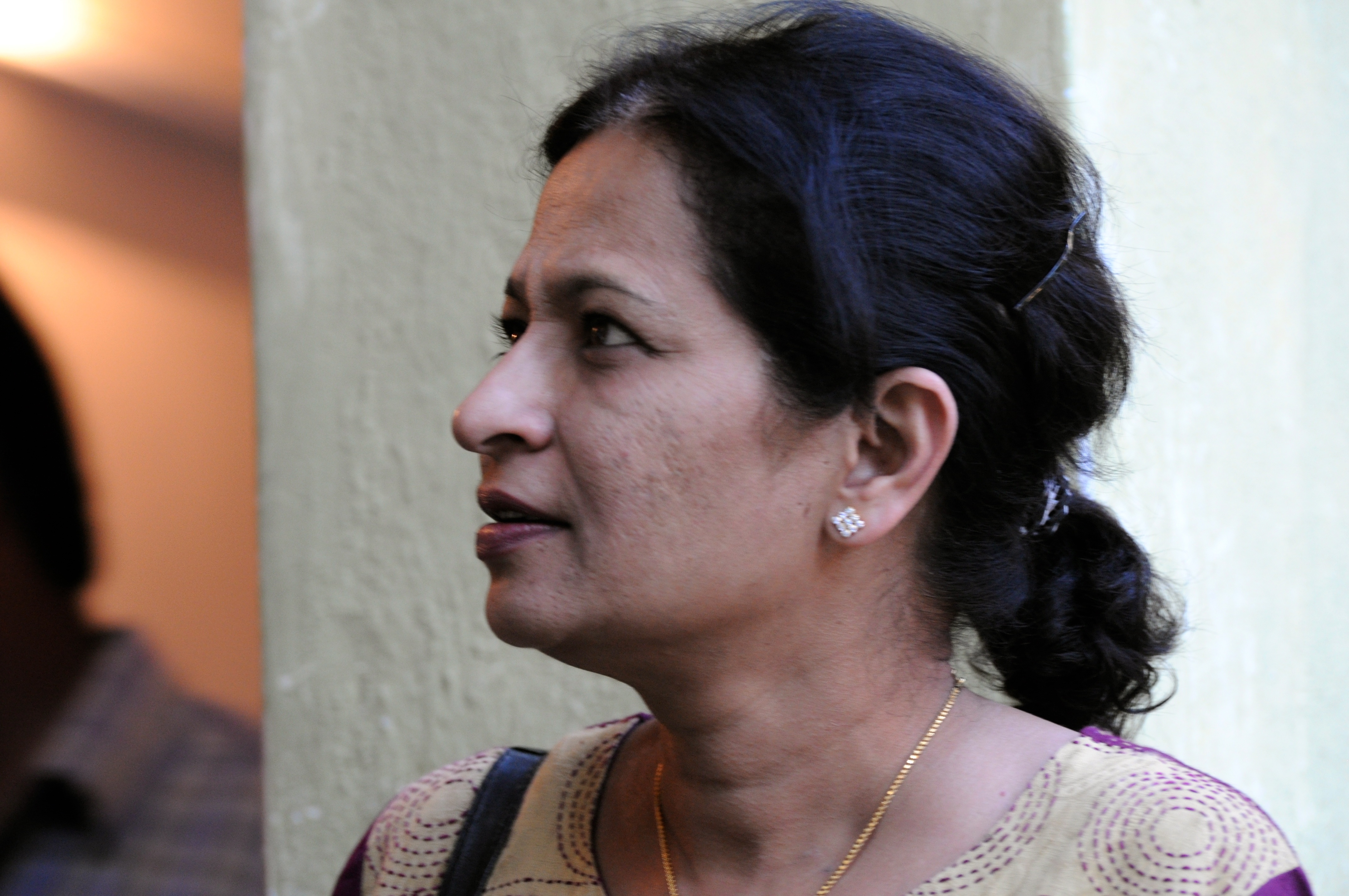
- Gauri in 2012
- Born: 29 January 1962; Bangalore, Mysore State, India
- Died: 5 September 2017 (aged 55); Bengaluru, Karnataka, India
- Cause of death: Murder (gunshot wounds)
- Occupations: Activist, journalist
- Employer: Lankesh Patrike
- Spouse: Chidanand Rajghatta
- Family: P. Lankesh (father); Indrajit Lankesh (brother); Kavitha Lankesh (sister)
- Awards: Anna Politkovskaya Award

Gauri Lankesh (29 January 1962 – 5 September 2017) was an Indian activist and journalist from Bangalore, Karnataka. She worked as an editor in Lankesh Patrike, a Kannada weekly started by her father P. Lankesh, and ran her own weekly called Gauri Lankesh Patrike. She was murdered outside her home in Rajarajeshwari Nagar on 5 September 2017. At the time of her death, Gauri was known for being a critic of right-wing Hindu extremism. She was honoured with the Anna Politkovskaya Award for speaking against right-wing Hindu extremism, campaigning for women's rights and opposing caste-based discrimination.

== Early life and career ==
Gauri Lankesh was born into a Kannada Lingayat family on 29 January 1962. Her father was the poet-journalist P. Lankesh, who established the Kannada-language weekly tabloid Lankesh Patrike. She had two siblings, Kavitha and Indrajit.

Gauri started her career as a journalist with The Times of India in Bangalore. Later, she moved to Delhi with her husband, Chidanand Rajghatta. Shortly after, she returned to Bangalore, where she worked as a correspondent for the Sunday magazine for nine years. At the time of her father's death in 2000, she was working for Eenadu's Telugu television channel in Delhi. By this time, she had been a journalist for 16 years.

=== Lankesh Patrike ===
When their father P. Lankesh died, Gauri and her younger brother Indrajit visited Mani, the publisher of Lankesh Patrike, and told him that they wanted to discontinue the publication. Mani convinced them against the idea. Gauri then became the editor of Lankesh Patrike, while Indrajit handled the publication's business affairs.

Beginning in 2001, differences developed between Gauri and Indrajit over the paper's ideology. These differences became public in February 2005, when a report about a Naxalite attack on policemen, approved by Gauri, was published in the magazine. On 13 February, Indrajit (who was the paper's proprietor and publisher) withdrew the report, alleging that it favoured the Naxals. On 14 February, Indrajit filed a police complaint against Gauri, accusing her of stealing a computer, printer, and scanner from the publication's office. Gauri filed a counter-complaint, accusing Indrajit of threatening her with a revolver. On 15 February, Indrajit held a press conference, where he accused Gauri of promoting Naxalism through the paper. Gauri held a separate press conference where she denied the accusation and stated that her brother was opposed to her social activism. Gauri subsequently started her own Kannada weekly called Gauri Lankesh Patrike.

=== Political views and ideology ===
Gauri was a staunch critic of right-wing Hindutva politics. In 2003, she opposed Sangh Parivar's alleged attempts to Hinduise the Sufi shrine Guru Dattatreya Baba Budan Dargah located at Baba Budan giri. In 2012, while participating in a protest demanding a ban on communal groups in Mangalore, she stated that Hinduism was not a religion but a "system of hierarchy in society" in which "women are treated as second-class creatures". She endorsed a minority religion tag for the Lingayat community and headed the Komu Souharda Vedike, a communal harmony platform for the oppressed communities. She was also of the view that the followers of philosopher Basavanna were not Hindus.

Gauri was known for advocating freedom of the press. She had written about the wrongdoings of the Indian National Congress leader, D. K. Shivakumar, a close associate of the former Chief Minister of Karnataka, S. M. Krishna. She also wrote extensively about sexual assault and rape cases involving religious figures, including those against Raghaveshwara Bharati, the head seer of Ramachandrapura Math, who faced multiple rape allegations. She was opposed to the Bharatiya Janata Party (BJP) and ended her 35-year friendship with Prakash Belawadi when the latter became a media advisor to the BJP during the 2014 Indian general election. In November 2014, the Congress-led Karnataka government appointed Gauri as a member of a committee aimed at convincing Naxalites to give up violence and surrender. However, a delegation of BJP leaders accused her of being a Naxalite sympathiser and demanded her removal from the committee. The chief minister Siddaramaiah rejected the demand.

Gauri was openly critical of the caste system. In 2015, some Brahmins accused her of criticising the novelist S. L. Bhyrappa and Brahminism during the 81st Kannada Sahitya Sammelana (Kannada literary conference) held at Shravanabelagola. At the conference, Gauri remarked that the non-Brahmin Dalit author Perumal Murugan was criticised by right-wing Hindu groups for depicting a childless Hindu couple who indulged in consensual sex rituals outside of marriage to have children in his book One Part Woman. She then pointed out that the Brahmin novelist S. L. Bhyrappa had also depicted the similar Niyoga practice in his novel Parva, a retelling of the Hindu epic Mahabharata. She clarified that she was supportive of both these writers, and asked why the Hindu groups who were offended by Perumal Murugan were not offended by Bhyrappa. On 19 February 2015, protesters from the Hassan Zilla Brahmin Sabha ("Hassan district Brahmin Association") organised a rally against her, urging the police to register a First Information Report against her.

=== Legal controversies ===
Gauri faced several legal cases during her career as a journalist and activist. She had three cases filed against her in Dakshina Kannada district, including two defamation cases filed by Raghaveshwara Bharati for writing about his alleged rapes and sexual assaults.

== Defamation conviction in 2016 ==
On 23 January 2008, Gauri published an article titled "Darodegilada BJP galu" in her newspaper. The article criticised the BJP leaders Pralhad Joshi, Umesh Dushi, Shivanand Bhat, and Venkatesh Mestry. The article stated that the three BJP workers had cheated a jeweller of ₹100,000 (equivalent to ₹160,000 or US$1,700 in 2026). It also stated that the jeweller sought payment from Member of Parliament Joshi and threatened to approach the police should Joshi refuse to help him. Gauri later claimed that the article was based on "sources within the BJP".

Joshi and Dushi filed separate defamation suits against Gauri. In Dushi's case, she was a co-accused with Devanand Jagapur, the writer of the article.

Gauri stated that she was being targeted for her left-leaning political views, as the BJP leaders did not sue other local dailies who had published the same allegations. Gauri moved the case to the High Court, seeking dismissal of the case against her. However, in 2016, the High Court refused to dismiss the case and gave instructions for the hearing to be continued in the lower court. The High Court granted a four-week stay on the case, however, and directed the lower court to complete the trial within six months.

In October 2016, the second Judicial Magistrate First Class (JMFC) Court at Hubli issued an arrest warrant for Gauri after she failed to appear before the court and did not respond to earlier warrants. The police detained her and produced her before the court on 1 October 2016. She was released on bail after furnishing a personal bond of ₹25,000 (equivalent to ₹39,000 or US$420 in 2026).

On 27 November 2016, the second JMFC court concluded that Gauri had failed to provide any substantial evidence for her criticism of the BJP leaders and found her guilty of defamation. The court imposed a fine of ₹5,000 (equivalent to ₹7,800 or US$84 in 2026) on her in each case. Besides the total fine of ₹10,000 (equivalent to ₹16,000 or US$170 in 2026), the court also sentenced her to six months imprisonment. Her co-accused, Devanand Jagapur, was acquitted by the same court. The same court granted her anticipatory bail, however, which allowed her to avoid prison time.

Gauri stated that the BJP leaders had managed to cover their tracks by reaching a compromise with the jeweler; she refused to disclose her source for the corruption allegations against them. She also described the court verdict as a temporary setback and declared that she would challenge it in the higher court.

== Personal life ==
Gauri and Chidanand Rajghatta divorced after five years of marriage; she remained single after the separation. Although she lived alone and did not have any children, she considered the activists Jignesh Mevani, Kanhaiya Kumar, Umar Khalid and Shehla Rashid Shora her "adopted children" metaphorically.

== Death ==
On 5 September 2017, Gauri died after being shot by three unidentified men at her house in Rajarajeshwari Nagar, Bangalore. The men fired at least seven bullets at her at around 8 p.m. as she was unlocking the main door of her house after returning from her office. One of the killers, who was waiting for her near her house, fired the first shots at her, while the two others, who are suspected to have followed her from her office, joined the initial shooter thereafter. The killers were wearing helmets and escaped on a two-wheeler Honda Dio after the murder. Three of the bullets pierced Gauri's head, neck, and chest, killing her instantly.

=== Reactions ===
The murder was condemned by several people and organisations, including the Indian National Congress and the Rashtriya Swayamsevak Sangh. The Congress leader and Karnataka Home Minister Ramalinga Reddy compared the murder to that of Narendra Dabholkar and M. M. Kalburgi. Controversial statements by BJP MLA D. N. Jeevaraj and Sri Ram Sena chief Pramod Muthalik were widely criticized. The state police chief, R. K. Dutta, refused to suggest any possible suspects without investigation. BJP leaders criticised the Congress-led state government for allegedly failing to protect the lives of Gauri and other writers like Kalburgi. Protests over her death took place all across India, including a rally in Bangalore a week after the funeral attended by more than 25,000 people.

Gauri was given a state funeral with a gun salute on 6 September, after her body was kept for a few hours at Ravindra Kalakshetra for the public to pay tribute. She was buried in accordance with Lingayat customs. Her family did not follow any religious customs for her as she identified as a rationalist. The BBC described it as the most high-profile journalist murdered in recent years.

The New York Times reported that several accounts followed by prime minister Narendra Modi had posted "hateful" tweets in response to Lankesh's assassination, prompting a debate in India.

Her close friend and actor Prakash Raj commented that "When I was burying Gowri, I said I'm not burying Gowri but burying a seed," at the Wayanad Literature Festival. For many across the nation, her death was a wake up call to take action and highlight the precarious state of press freedom in the country. "Before Gowri's death, I was an angry man, yes, but not to this extent," he added.

=== Investigation ===
During their investigation, the police accessed CCTV footage from her residence and the route leading from Basavanagudi to her house. The city was kept on high alert the day after her death, with police deployed at toll gates in Nelamangala, Hosur Road and NICE Road in search of the killers. Vehicles entering or exiting the city underwent stringent checks, while police in the neighbouring states of Andhra Pradesh, Maharashtra and Tamil Nadu were also alerted. On September 8, 2017, the Karnataka government announced a reward of ₹1 million (equivalent to ₹1.5 million or US$16,000 in 2026) for providing information about the killers.

In 2018, the Special Investigation Team (SIT) probing the murder case detained two suspects, whom they also suspected of being involved in the murders of Dabholkar and Kalburgi. In June 2018, the SIT stated that Parashuram Waghmore had confessed to the murder: he claimed that he was told to kill someone to save his religion, and that he did not know who the victim was. In September 2018, Maharashtra ATS detained 2 suspects related to Gauri's murder and also recovered a cache of weapons from them. A March 2019 New York Times article on Gauri Lankesh includes a discussion of the police investigation and murder charges. Her relatives and friends discuss the investigation in a podcast published by openDemocracy in January 2022.

On 11 August 2022, the special court for Karnataka Control of Organised Crime examined three more witnesses, including two policemen, in the murder trial.

== In popular culture ==
External videos
- विवेक धारावाहिक Vivek Reason on YouTube.

- The assassination of Gauri Lankesh is featured along with assassinations of other rationalists such as Narendra Dabholkar, M. M. Kalburgi and Govind Pansare in the documentary mini-series Vivek-Reason by Anand Patwardhan.
- The Malayalam film 19(1)(A) is loosely based on Gauri Lankesh.

== Legacy ==
Gauri Lankesh is seen as an important figure for people protesting against rightward shift in the Indian governance. On her third death anniversary, several journalists and activists participated in #IfWeDoNotRise campaign in her memory and in wake of arrests of dissidents across the nation.

In 2021, the Canadian city of Burnaby decided to celebrate September 5, her death anniversary, as Gauri Lankesh Day.

In 2023, "Forbidden Stories pursued Lankesh’s work on fake news and explored new leads in her murder case" as part of the case series Story Killers.

In 2024, American journalist Rollo Romig published the book I Am on the Hit List: A Journalist's Murder and the Myth-Making in South India, which examines Lankesh's murder, the subsequent investigation linking it to right-wing groups such as the Sanatan Sanstha, and the ideological conflicts in South India at the time.
