= Thuntata =

- Directed by: Indrajith Lankesh
- Written by: B. A. Madhu (Dialogues)
- Screenplay by: B. A. Madhu
- Story by: Indrajith Lankesh
- Produced by: A. Balachandra; C. Nagaraju
- Starring: Anirudh; Rekha Vedavyas; Chaya Singh
- Cinematography: A.V. Krishna Kumar
- Edited by: T. Shashi kumar
- Music by: Gurukiran
- Production company: Publisher's Productions
- Release date: 24 May 2002
- Running time: 2 hours 11 minutes
- Country: India
- Language: Kannada

Thuntata is a 2002 Kannada romantic-comedy film directed by Indrajit Lankesh featuring Anirudh, Rekha Vedavyas and Chaya Singh. The film was released on 24 May 2002. The film won the V Shantaram Award for Best Debut Director.

== Cast ==
- Anirudh as Sachin
- Rekha Vedavyas as Aishwarya
- Chaya Singh as Priyanka
- Umashree as 'Lingo' Leela
- Tennis Krishna
- Kashi as Mr. Menasinakayi
- Mandya Ramesh as Mandya
- Harish
- Niranjan Shetty
- Haridas G.
- Ramakrishna as Sachin's father
- Vanitha Vasu as Sachin's mother
- Gandasi Nagaraj
- Gundlupete Suresh
- Saurav Lokesh
- Jai Jagadish
- Gurukiran
- Hosmane Murthy
- Akarsh
- Yogendran
- Sudeep (cameo appearance in the song "Sutha Mutha Yaar")
- Indrajith Lankesh in a special appearance
- Nagathihalli Chandrashekhar in a special appearance

== Production ==
When Rekha Vedavyas initially was unreachable, Indrajit Lankesh considered Riya Sen for the role before Rekha agreed to be a part of the film. Chaya Singh also took time to agree to star in the film. The film was shot in a Bengaluru college, Goa, Mangalore and Mysore.

== Soundtrack ==
The music was composed by Gurukiran and released by Ashwini Recording Company.

Thuntata

Soundtrack album by Gurukiran
- Released: May 19, 2002
- Recorded: 2002
- Genre: Soundtrack
- Length: 28:48
- Label: Ashwini Recording Company
- Producer: Gurukiran

Gurukiran chronology
Chandu (2002)	Thuntata (2002)	Dhruva (2002)

Tracklist
No.	Title	Lyrics	Singer(s)	Length
1.	"Hello"	V. Manohar	Gurukiran, Sowmya Raoh	5:43
2.	"Kathura Manpura"	Nagathihalli Chandrashekhar	Udit Narayan, Kavita Krishnamurthy	4:25
3.	"Malagoba Malagoba"	Gurukiran	B. Jayashree, Hemanth	4:40
4.	"Sarigama"	K. Kalyan	Hemanth, Nanditha, Priya	4:51
5.	"Sutha Mutha"	Sadashiv Shenoy	Gurukiran, Anupama	4:35
6.	"Yavudo Yavudo"	K. Kalyan	S. P. Balasubrahmanyam	4:34
Total length:				28:48
