= Pallavi (1976 film) =

1976 film directed by P. Lankesh

- Lobby card
- Directed by: P. Lankesh
- Written by: P. Lankesh
- Based on: Biruku by P. Lankesh
- Produced by: K. S. Indira Lankesh
- Starring: Vimala Naidu; P. Lankesh; T. N. Seetharam
- Cinematography: S. Ramachandra
- Music by: Rajeev Taranath
- Production company: Indira Lankesh Productions
- Release date: 1976
- Running time: 129 minutes
- Country: India
- Language: Kannada

Pallavi ( transl. Refrain) is a 1976 Indian Kannada-language drama film directed by novelist P. Lankesh, in his directorial debut. He also stars, alongside Vimala Naidu and T. N. Seetharam. The film is based on his own 1967 novella Biruku (transl. Crack), and focuses on two lovers whose relationship ends when the man fails in life while the woman succeeds.

Pallavi won three National Film Awards: Second Best Feature Film, Best Feature Film in Kannada and Best Direction. It also won five Karnataka State Film Awards: Best Film, Best Direction (Lankesh), Best Music (Rajeev Taranath), Best Screenplay and Best Dialogues (Lankesh).

== Plot ==
Shanta is a bouncy university teenager who idolises film actresses. She is as idealistic as her boyfriend Chandru. The two apply for jobs; while Chandru is rejected because of his rudeness, Shanta is accepted because of her charm and self-confidence. Chandru ends his relationship with Shanta. Shanta eventually marries her boss, Jagannathan. Shanta then combines her new leisurely existence as a sophisticated wife with traditional chores and rituals. Boredom and pregnancy overcome her.

Chandru suddenly resurfaces, a fugitive from justice. Shanta is initially intrigued by his attitudes which are very much in opposition to hers. But when Chandru harangues Shanta for resigning herself to security and a constricting marriage, she refuses to go with him, and accuses him of abandoning her in the first place. He threatens to destroy her world, but is finally overpowered by the police. Shanta is left to carry on with her undisturbed, uneventful life.

== Cast ==
- Vimala Naidu as Shanta
- P. Lankesh as Jagannathan
- T. N. Seetharam as Chandru

== Production ==
Pallavi is novelist P. Lankesh's directorial debut. It is based on his own 1967 novella Biruku. In his 1997 autobiography Huli-Maavina Mara (transl. A Sour-Mango Tree), Lankesh claimed that his passion for making films led him to direct a film without any prior experience in the field. The film was produced by K. S. Indira Lankesh under the banner Indira Lankesh Productions. Cinematography was handled by S. Ramachandra. T. N. Seetharam made his acting debut with this film. Principal photography began on the same day as the declaration of "the Emergency". P. Lankesh's voice was dubbed by T. S. Ranga.

== Themes ==
Pallavi deals with themes such as student union revolution, college life, and unemployment issues in the hands of bureaucrats. According to the 1998 edition of Encyclopaedia of Indian Cinema, it was one of only three films to have direct political and formal links with the Navya Movement.

== Music ==
The music of the film was composed by Rajeev Taranath.

== Reception ==
Peter Cowie wrote in the book International Film Guide 1978, "Pallavi has some of the flaws common to a first film (Lankesh, much admired as a Kannada writer, is new to the cinema), but is actually very competent and unswerving in its denunciation of the primitive role still accorded to most Indian women." At the 24th National Film Awards, Pallavi won in three categories: Second Best Feature Film, Best Feature Film in Kannada and Best Direction for Lankesh. It won in five categories at the Karnataka State Film Awards: Best Film, Best Direction (Lankesh), Best Music (Rajeev Taranath), Best Screenplay and Best Dialogues (Lankesh).

== Impact ==
In the book A Handbook of Karnataka, historian Suryanath U. Kamath considered Pallavi, amongst many other films, to be responsible for establishing the 1970s as the "age of the new-wave or experimental films" in Karnataka.

== Bibliography ==
- Rajadhyaksha, Ashish; Willemen, Paul (1998) [1994]. Encyclopaedia of Indian Cinema. British Film Institute and Oxford University Press. ISBN 0-19-563579-5.
