= Lankesh Patrike =

Indian newspaper

- Type: Weekly
- Format: Print, online
- Founder: P. Lankesh
- Publisher: Indrajit Lankesh
- Editor: B.T. Lalita Naik, Vaidehi B.M.Rasheed, Sara Abubakkar, Banu Mushtaq
- Founded: 1980; 45 years ago
- Political alignment: Left
- Language: Kannada
- Headquarters: Bangalore, Karnataka
- Country: India
- Website: lankeshpatrike.com

Lankesh Patrike is an Indian vernacular weekly published in Kannada language from Bangalore, Karnataka.

The weekly newspaper was started by P. Lankesh in 1980 on the lines of Harijan, a newspaper published by Mahatma Gandhi. The weekly remains to this day true to its principles and has never published a single advertisement or generated any ad revenue, surviving these last 37 years on subscription from its readers alone.

The weekly aimed to be a platform for the oppressed, Dalits, women and marginalised sections of Indian society. It popularised a brand of journalism that grew to be the voice of these sections, playing an important role in the Raitara Chaluvali (Farmers Agitation), the Dalit movement, and the Gokak movement started by the newspaper's founder, P. Lankesh. Lankesh led the newspaper from 1980 until his death in 2000. At its peak, the weekly enjoyed a readership of 2.5 million, with a circulation of 4.5 lakhs.

Lankesh Patrike introduced a number of new writers to the Kannada literary scene. Some of them, like B.T. Lalita Naik, Vaidehi B.M.Rasheed, Sara Abubakkar, and Banu Mushtaq, later went on to win accolades as writers.

== 1980–2000: P. Lankesh ==
The Sahitya Akademi Award-winning writer P. Lankesh was the founder and editor of Lankesh Patrike from 1980 until his death in 2000. Lankesh quit his job as an assistant professor of English at Bangalore University in 1980 to start Lankesh Patrike, the first Kannada tabloid, which went on to have an enormous impact on Kannada culture and politics.

A staunch socialist and Lohiaite, Lankesh, before starting Lankesh Patrike, along with his socialist friends Ramdass and Tejaswi, had toured the length and breadth of Karnataka, mobilising people to vote for their new socialist party. It was this trip, he recounted in one of his editorials, that took him to the remotest parts of Karnataka and opened his eyes to the plight of the poor and the Dalits, and made him realise his responsibility as a writer and an intellectual towards society.

The weekly followed this as its mission and has continued to fight for the oppressed class, the Dalits, and the poor under the managing editorship of Lankesh's son, Indrajit Lankesh, who had been associated with the paper for 25 years.

== After P. Lankesh's death ==
After the death of P. Lankesh, his son Indrajit Lankesh became the paper's proprietor, managing editor and publisher, while his daughter Gauri Lankesh became the editor. Soon after, differences developed between Gauri and Indrajit over the paper's ideology. In February 2005, the siblings made public accusations against each other: Indrajit accused Gauri of promoting Naxalism through the paper; Gauri denied these charges and stated that Indrajit was opposed to her social activism. Gauri subsequently left Lankesh Patrike and filed a complaint alleging that her brother had threatened her. Police after investigation filed a B report stating that it was a false FIR. The court passed the order in favour of Indrajit Lankesh. Gauri started her own Kannada weekly called Gauri Lankesh Patrike. On 5 September 2017, Gauri was shot dead, at her house in Rajarajeshwari Nagar, by unknown assailants, reportedly for her views against Hinduism. She had received multiple death threats previously for a range of views.

== See also ==
- List of Kannada-language newspapers
- List of Kannada-language magazines
- List of newspapers in India
- Media in Karnataka
- Media of India
