= Indrajit Lankesh =

Indian film director

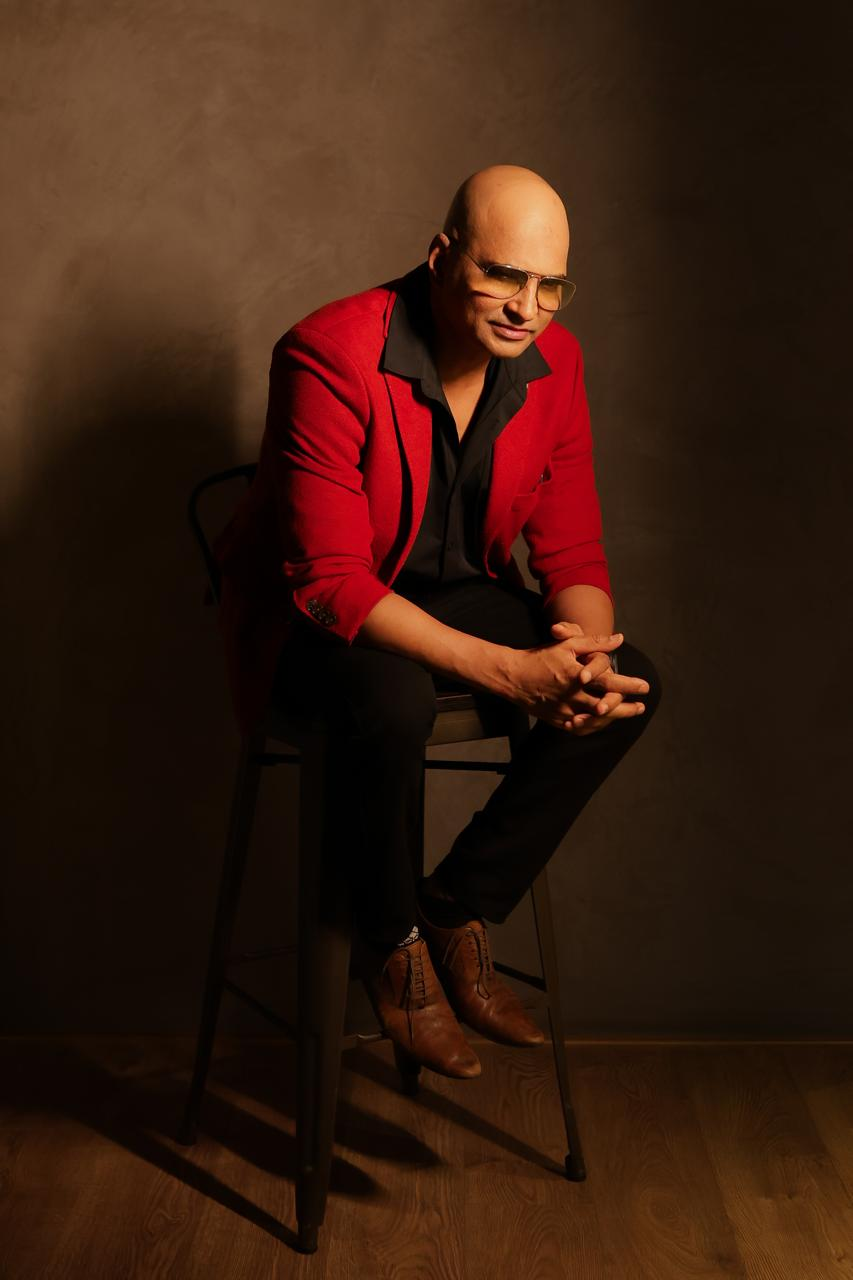
- Indrajit Lankesh in 2026
- Born: Bengaluru, Karnataka, India
- Occupations: Film director, actor and journalist
- Spouse: Arpitha Lankesh
- Children: Samarjit Lankesh (Son) , Samay Lankesh (Son)
- Parent: P. Lankesh (father)
- Relatives: Gauri Lankesh (sister); Kavitha Lankesh (sister)

Indrajit Lankesh is an Indian filmmaker, producer, director, screenwriter, and television Personality of Kannada and Hindi films. He is also the publisher of the weekly Kannada tabloid Lankesh Patrike. He is the son of iconic writer, journalist and film maker P. Lankesh.

== Early life ==
Indrajit comes from a prominent family of journalists and media publishers. His father P. Lankesh founded the highly successful weekly tabloid Lankesh Patrike. His sister Kavitha Lankesh is a filmmaker and his other sister Gauri Lankesh was a journalist/activist. He involved in various social and philanthropic initiatives.

He involved in various social and philanthropic initiatives.

== Career ==
=== Film Career ===
Indrajit Lankesh began his career as a director in 2001. His debut film, Thuntata, was an Aniruddh – Rekha Vedavyas- Chaya Singh starrer, which won him the V. Shantaram Award for Best Debutant Director, along with the Shankarnag Award for the same.

In 2004, Lankesh directed the film Monalisa starring Dhyan and Sadha in the lead roles. This film brought him to the limelight again and he received the Karnataka State Film Award for Best Director and Best Film.

Indrajit is credited with introducing actress Deepika Padukone to the film industry, casting her in her feature film debut, the 2006 Kannada romantic drama Aishwarya.

He recently announced his involvement in a new directorial venture titled "Jai Hindh Jai Sindh:A Love Story",produced by Sammy Nanwani under the banner of Sammy's Entertainment. The film features an ensemble cast including Mahesh Manjrekar, Vikram Kochhar, Indira Tiwari, Chhaya Kadam, Jaya Prada, and Zarina Wahab.

=== Journalism Career ===
Indrajit Lankesh became the editor and publisher of the Kannada weekly tabloid Lankesh Patrike in 2000, following the death of its founder, P. Lankesh. He has held these positions for over 25 years. The publication continues a policy of not accepting commercial advertisements, relying on circulation sales and subscriptions.

As editor, Lankesh has overseen the tabloid's coverage of political and social matters in Karnataka. His work has included investigative reports on administrative corruption and social issues. In August 2020, he made a series of public statements regarding drug use and exploitation within the Kannada film industry. Following these statements, he was summoned by the Central Crime Branch (CCB) of Bengaluru to provide information related to his claims.

=== Television ===
Lankesh was a permanent judge on the Kannada comedy television series Majaa Talkies, appearing on the show for over six years.

== Filmography ==
- Note: all films are in Kannada, unless otherwise noted.

Year	Title	Credited as		Notes
Year	Title	Director	Actor	Notes
2002	Thuntata	Yes	Yes	
2003	Lankesh Patrike	Yes	Yes	
2004	Monalisa	Yes	Yes	
2006	Aishwarya	Yes	Yes	
2010	Huduga Hudugi	Yes	Yes	
2012	Dev Son of Mudde Gowda	Yes	Yes	
2016	Luv U Alia	Yes	Yes	
2020	Shakeela	Yes		Hindi film
2024	Gowri	Yes		
2024	UI		Yes	
2026	Jai Hindh Jai Sindh: A Love Sory	Yes		Hindi film

== Awards and achievements ==
Year	Awards and Award Category	Film	Ref.
2002	Won - V Shantaram Award – Best Debut Director	Thuntata	
2004	Won - Karnataka State Film Award for Best Director	Monalisa	
2006	Won - Filmfare Award for Best Director – Kannada; Aryabhatta Ragavendra Swamy Award; Shankarnag Award for Direction	Aishwarya	
