= Shakeela (film) =

2020 film by Indrajit Lankesh

- Theatrical release poster
- Directed by: Indrajit Lankesh
- Written by: Indrajit Lankesh
- Produced by: Sammy Nanwani; Sahil Nanwani
- Starring: Richa Chadda; Pankaj Tripathi; Rajeev Pillai
- Cinematography: Santosh Rai Pathaje
- Edited by: Ballu Saluja
- Music by: Veer Samarth; Meet Bros
- Production company: Sammy's Magic Cinema Motion Picture Production
- Distributed by: UFO Moviez
- Release date: 25 December 2020
- Country: India
- Language: Hindi

Shakeela is a 2020 Indian Hindi-language biographical film written and directed by Indrajit Lankesh. The film stars Richa Chadda as the eponymous adult star of 1990s who acted in adult films in several Indian languages, with Pankaj Tripathi and Rajeev Pillai in supporting roles. Shakeela was released on 25 December 2020.

== Cast ==
- Richa Chadda as Shakeela
- Pankaj Tripathi as Superstar Salim
- Rajeev Pillai as Arjun
- Ester Noronha as Suhana
- Kajol Chugh as Young Shakeela
- Sheeva Rana as Silk Smitha
- Ahaana Kochar as Ahaana
- Suchendra Prasad as SI Aarumugam
- Valerian Menezes as a director of Salim

== Production ==
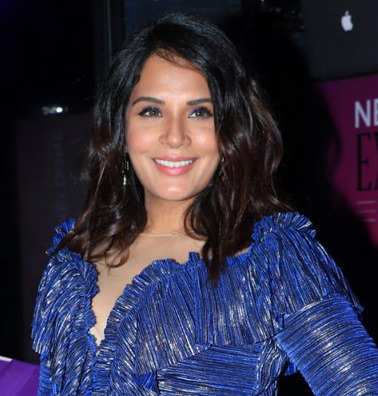
Richa Chadha at the launch of the Shakeela 2019 Calendar

Lankesh started working on the film in 2019. Richa Chadda said in an interview that she came to know many lesser known facts about Shakeela like she hired a body double to do her scenes. Though the posters and few glimpses were out in 2018 and 2019 by Shakeela team.

== Release ==
The film released on 25 December 2020 (on Christmas) in four languages : Kannada, Hindi, Telugu, Tamil, Malayalam languages. The box office collections of the film was affected by piracy after HD version with subtitles was leaked online on torrent sites, the leak was traced to someone in the Middle East.

== Soundtrack ==
Shakeela

Soundtrack album by Veer Samarth and Meet Bros
- Released: 24 December 2020 (All languages)
- Recorded: 2019
- Genre: Feature film soundtrack
- Length: 10:06 (Hindi); 10:10 (Malayalam, Tamil), (Telugu), (Kannada)
- Language: Hindi; Malayalam; Tamil; Telugu; Kannada
- Label: Zee Music Company

The songs are composed by Veer Samarth and Meet Bros. The lyrics are written by Kumaar in Hindi, Rajeev Alunkal, Saheb Khan and Dhanasekar in Malayalam, Rajesh Malarvannan in Tamil, Rajshri Sudhakar in Telugu. Jayanth Kaikini, Veeresh MP and Krishna Ritti in Kannada.

=== Track list Hindi (original) ===
Track listing
| No. | Title | Lyrics | Music | Singer(s) | Length |
|---|---|---|---|---|---|
| 1. | "Woh Lamha" | Kumaar | Veer Samarth | Vishal Mishra | 3:27 |
| 2. | "Taaza" | Kumaar | Veer Samarth | Prakriti Kakar, Veer Samarth, Saheb Khan | 3:21 |
| 3. | "Tera Ishq Satave" | Kumaar | Meet Bros | Khushboo Grewal, Meet Bros | 3:18 |
| Total length: | | | | | 10:06 |

=== Track list Malayalam ===
Track listing
| No. | Title | Lyrics | Music | Singer(s) | Length |
|---|---|---|---|---|---|
| 1. | "Neeyenn Anandham" | Rajeev Alunkal | Veer Samarth | Nivas | 3:31 |
| 2. | "Taara" | Rajeev Alunkal, Saheb Khan | Veer Samarth | Nincy Vincent | 3:21 |
| 3. | "Love Me" | Rajeev Alunkal, Dhanasekar | Meet Bros | Nincy Vincent | 3:18 |
| Total length: | | | | | 10:10 |

=== Track list Tamil ===
Track listing
| No. | Title | Lyrics | Music | Singer(s) | Length |
|---|---|---|---|---|---|
| 1. | "Mazhai Saavalai" | Rajesh Malarvannan | Veer Samarth | Nivas | 3:31 |
| 2. | "Thennai" | Rajesh Malarvannan | Veer Samarth | Nancy Vincent | 3:21 |
| 3. | "Love Me" | Rajesh Malarvannan | Meet Bros | Rita | 3:18 |
| Total length: | | | | | 10:10 |

=== Track list Telugu ===
Track listing
| No. | Title | Lyrics | Music | Singer(s) | Length |
|---|---|---|---|---|---|
| 1. | "Neene Neelona" | Rajshri Sudhakar | Veer Samarth | Nivas | 3:31 |
| 2. | "Taaza" | Rajshri Sudhakar | Veer Samarth | Nancy Vincent | 3:21 |
| 3. | "Love Me" | Rajshri Sudhakar | Meet Bros | Rita | 3:18 |
| Total length: | | | | | 10:10 |

=== Track list Kannada ===
Track listing
| No. | Title | Lyrics | Music | Singer(s) | Length |
|---|---|---|---|---|---|
| 1. | "Hawamaanakke" | Jayanth Kaikini | Veer Samarth | Keshav Kumar | 3:31 |
| 2. | "Taaza" | Veeresh MP | Veer Samarth | Aishwarya Rangarajan, Veer Samarth, Saheb Khan | 3:21 |
| 3. | "Love Me" | Krishna Ritti | Meet Bros | Aishwarya Rangarajan | 3:18 |
| Total length: | | | | | 10:10 |
