= Chidanand Rajghatta =

Indian journalist

Chidanand Rajghatta is an Indian-born, opinion columnist based in Washington, D.C. He is the present foreign opinion columnist and a blogger based in the United States for The Times of India. He received his master's degree in mass communication from Bangalore University, Bangalore.

He is the author of The Horse That Flew: How India's Silicon Gurus Spread Their Wings, published by HarperCollins.

His marriage to activist and journalist Gauri Lankesh ended in a divorce. She died in September 2017 after being shot in Bangalore.
