= Bageshwari =

Bageshwari may refer to:

- Bageshwari, Banke, Bheri Zone, Nepal
- Bageshwari, Bhaktapur, Bagmati Zone, Nepal
- Bageshwari, Parsa, Parsa District, Nepal

== See also ==
- Bageshwar, a town in Uttarakhand, India
  - Bageshwar district, district of Uttarakhand centred on the town
  - Bageshwar Assembly constituency, Uttarakhand Legislative Assembly
- Bageshwar Dham Balaji Temple, a Hindu temple in Madhya Pradesh, India
  - Bageshwar Dham Sarkar or Dhirendra Krishna Shastri, an Indian Hindu religious leader
- Bageshri, a raga of Carnatic music
