= Reason (film) =

- Directed by: Anand Patwardhan
- Written by: Anand Patwardhan
- Produced by: Anand Patwardhan
- Release date: 2018
- Running time: 261 minutes
- Country: India
- Languages: English; Hindi

Reason (titled Vivek in Hindi) is an Indian documentary film directed by Anand Patwardhan. The film premiered at the 2018 Toronto International Film Festival. Although it has never been officially released in India, it has been screened in private and was released on YouTube.

== Premise ==
The film is divided into eight chapters. The documentary delves into some of the socio-political issues in contemporary India, from the killings of rationalists such as Narendra Dabholkar, Govind Pansare, and M. M. Kalburgi and attacks on activists due to the influence of Hindutva organizations like Sanathan Sanstha and Abhinav Bharat. It takes a detailed look at the rise of hyper-nationalism and the targeting of Muslims and Dalits under the guise of cow protection. The film also highlights the growing acceptance of radical Hindu ideologies in the mainstream and the crackdown on dissent, particularly in universities, as part of a broader push to reshape India into a Hindu state.

== Reception ==
Neil Young of The Hollywood Reporter describes the film as a powerful and in-depth documentary that examines right-wing extremism in India, focusing on political violence, caste oppression, and rising nationalism. Despite its lengthy runtime and detailed approach, he finds it engaging and considers it an important work in political documentary filmmaking.

== Award ==
Reason was selected as the best documentary at the 31st International Documentary Film Festival Amsterdam. It also received the Audience Award at IFFLA, Los Angeles, in 2019.
