= Subodh Kerkar =

Indian installation artist and painter (born 1959)

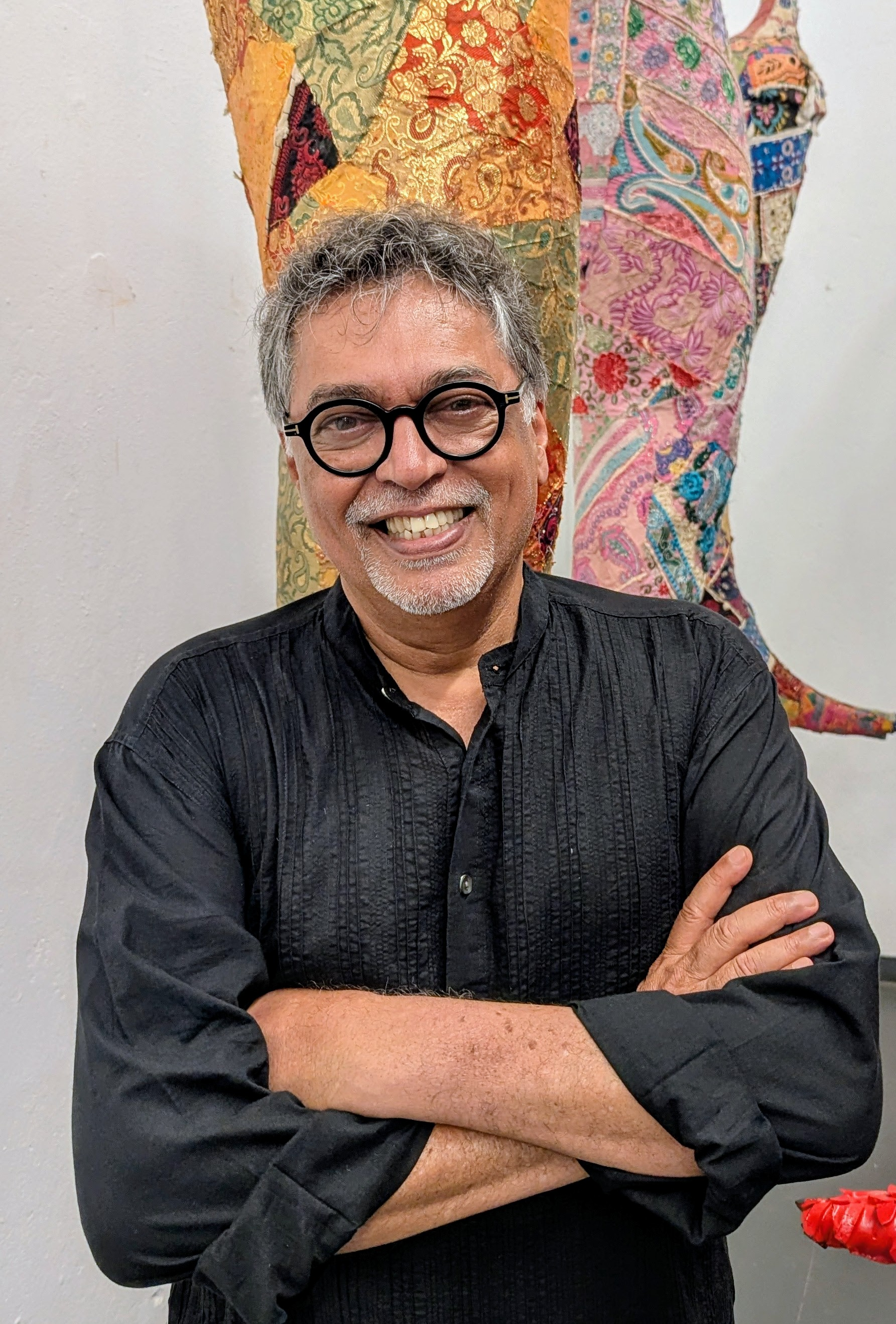
- Kerkar in 2025
- Born: Pernem, Goa, Portuguese India, Portuguese Empire
- Education: Goa Medical College
- Known for: Painting; sculpting; installation art
- Awards: Busan Biennale Award (2006)
- Website: subodhkerkar.com

Subodh Kerkar is an Indian painter, sculptor and installation artist, and founder of the contemporary art museum Museum of Goa. He is known for his artworks and installations. Kerkar's work has been displayed in India and abroad, including at art exhibitions such as the Sculpture by the Sea in 2011 and the Royal Academy Summer Exhibition in 2018. Another popular installation of his is the 2017 Carpet of Joy A 2018 photo exhibition of his on fishermen (chosen for the Royal Academy exhibition) was chosen by filmmaker Bharat Bala to be the subject of a documentary. He has spoken at Visva-Bharati University and the Van Gogh Museum.

== Early life ==
Subodh Kerkar is from Goa. As a student he created cartoons. He joined Goa Medical College and became a doctor by profession. Following this, he ran a hospital and private practice for a few years in Calangute, until he quit and decided to become an artist.

== Career ==
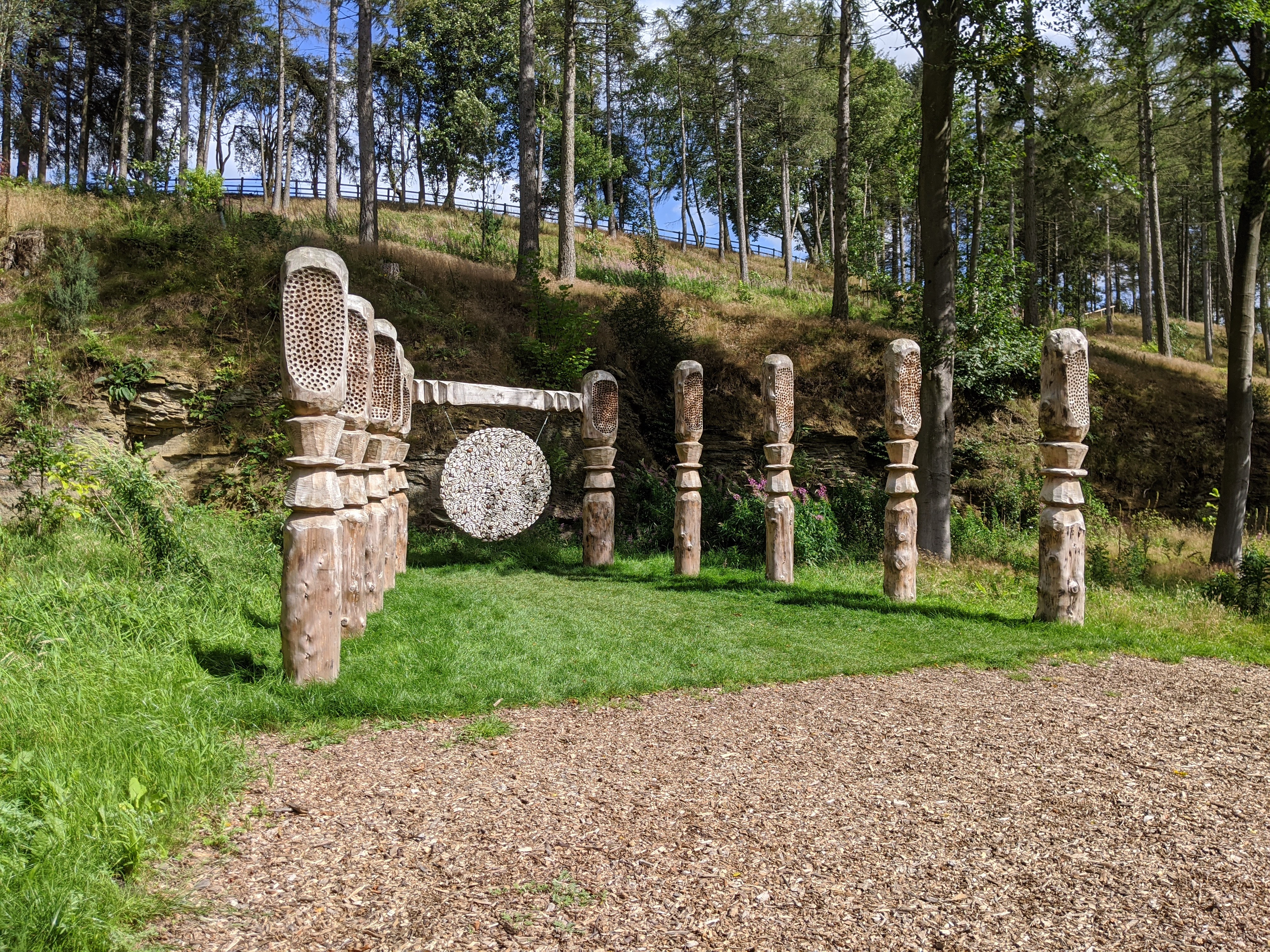
"The Ocean Comes to Yorkshire" a 2019 installation at the Himalayan Garden and Sculpture Park, Grewelthorpe, North Yorkshire, England

Kerkar began his career in art as a water colourist. He also explored art from around the world, and was soon attracted to installations and land art.

In 1987, he started his own art gallery, in Calangute, Goa. It was named the "Kerkar Art Complex", and had an open-air auditorium. He also began to exhibit at art galleries across the country.

In the 2000s, Kerkar began his foray into the field of "land art". He began by creating sculptures from scrap and garbage. In 2002, he created an installation artwork named Tenth Planet. In 2005, he followed with Sea Anemone. During Goa's first IFFI in 2004, Kerkar was chosen to set up 500 metres of installations along Miramar beach.

Following this, he was invited by some international biennales and art projects to create public sculptures. He created a work titled The Sea Remembers on Dubai's beach. He has since displayed his work on Goan beaches, and also in countries like Switzerland, South Korea, Macau, the Netherlands, Germany, Norway, Portugal and Australia.

In 2009, Kerkar launched an art exhibition in Mumbai to mark the anniversary of the 2008 Mumbai attacks.

In 2011, he was invited by the Dean of Visva-Bharati University at Shantiniketan, to conduct a workshop. In the same year, he created a fibre glass sculpture of a robot with an ass’ head.

Some of his art exhibits include Pepper Cross and Anchored Ocean.

In 2013, his sculpture named Chicken Cafreal (after the dish of the same name) was selected for the Sculpture by the Sea exhibition and competition in Australia. This was his third time getting selected there, after The Chilly (a huge red fibreglass chilly) in 2012.

At the India Art Fair in 2014, he showcased an artwork titled Palm Leaves, reminiscing his childhood in Goa, where palm trees are commonly found.

In 2015, he sold his art gallery and founded a new one, called Museum of Goa. The museum features many kinds of artwork, including works based on the ocean.

In 2017, he created the Carpet of Joy – an artwork to protest the excessive littering in Goa, on the 100th anniversary of Gandhi’s first experiment of satyagraha (which Gandhi began in Champaran on April 10, 1917). It used 1,50,000 discarded plastic bottles, collected from beaches and hotels in Goa, to weave a carpet. To celebrate the anniversary, Kerkar also worked with a team of software engineers and Dmytro Dokunov, a digital artist from Ukraine, to create an augmented reality smartphone app called "Gandhi AR", which would display a bust of Gandhi when pointed at any Indian currency (which features Gandhi on it).

In 2018, Kerkar's photo exhibition of fishermen was chosen for the Royal Academy Summer Exhibition. Later, it inspired filmmaker Bharat Bala to make a documentary on it.

In 2019, six of his sculptures were installed at the Himalayan Garden and Sculpture Park, Grewelthorpe, North Yorkshire, England, including The Ocean Comes to Yorkshire (pictured)

Kerkar delivers lectures in India and abroad, such as Amsterdam's Van Gogh Museum and University College London. He has also spoken at various TEDx events and at INKtalks.

== Personal Life ==
Professor Savita Kerkar, wife of Subodh Kerkar

Kerkar is married to Savita, the sister of academic Madhavi Sardesai and Vijai Sardesai. Together, Subodh and Sarita have two children, Siddharth and Sharada.

== Reception ==
In 2009, Kerkar launched an exhibition of sketches of Lord Ganesha. Organizations such as the Sanatan Sanstha called for protests, while others like the Hindu Janajagruti Samiti and the Shri Samarth Ramdas Seva Bhakti Mandal chose to file a police complaint under Section 149 of the Indian Penal Code, for hurting religious sentiments. Kerkar alleged that he received threats on his life for his work.

== Awards ==
- Busan Biennale Award (2006)
- First prize at the Kala Academy Art Show, Goa (2000)

== Filmography ==
- Battery Ki Chalo (Archived) 2018

== See also ==
- Museum of Goa
- Vamona Navelcar
