= Shyam Manav =

Indian rationalist and author (born 1951)

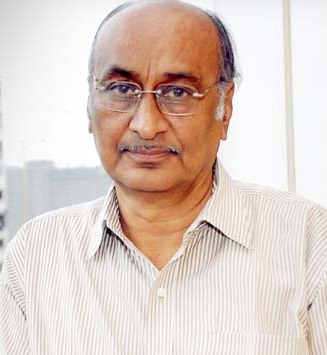
- Born: 9 September 1951 (age 74); Devali, Wardha, Maharashtra, India
- Known for: Founder of Akhil Bharatiya Andhashraddha Nirmoolan Samiti (ABANS)

YouTube information
- Genre: Rationalism
- Subscribers: 544 thousand
- Views: 64.6 million
- Last updated: 4 August 2026
- Website: shyammanav.com

Shyam Manav (born 9 September 1951) is an Indian rationalist and social reformer who leads the Akhil Bharatiya Andhashraddha Nirmoolan Samiti (ABANS) organization that fights superstitions. He established ABANS in 1982 along with other rationalist activists from India. He also runs his YouTube channel, where he discusses issues such as rationality, superstitions, and personality development. Manav was a major force behind the Anti-Superstition and Black Magic Act enacted by the Indian state of Maharashtra, which he helped draft as well.

== Career ==
Shyam Manav completed his Bachelor of Arts (B.A.) and Master of Arts (M.A) in English Literature after which he worked as a lecturer of English Literature.

He also worked as a journalist for various Nagpur-based newspapers such as Tarun Bharat, Nagpur Patrika and Lokmat for a few years.

In 1982, he formed Akhil Bharatiya Andhashraddha Nirmoolan Samiti (ABANS) to counter superstitions spread by various con-men masquerading as religious gurus.

In January 2022, he challenged Dhirendra Shastri, a religious guru who made headlines over his "miraculous cures".

=== Assassination attempts ===
However, his activism has not been welcomed by some groups who have issued threats to him, including threats to his life.

There has been multiple attempts on his life.

== See also ==
- Narendra Dabholkar
- Godman (India)
- Superstition in India
- Anti-Superstition and Black Magic Act
- Maharashtra Andhashraddha Nirmoolan Samiti
- Federation of Indian Rationalist Associations
