= Gadha, Chhatarpur =

Gadha Garha
- Village
- Location in the contiguous India and Chhatarpur Gadha (India)
- Coordinates: 24°54′58.878″N 79°34′52.262″E
- Country: India
- State: Madhya Pradesh
- District: Chhatarpur
- Tehsil: Rajnagar
- Elevation: 246 m (807 ft)

Languages
  - Spoken: Hindi, Bundeli

Law enforcement agency
  - Police Station: Bijawar Police Station of Chhatarpur Police
- Time zone: UTC+5:30 (IST)
- PIN: 471105
- Post office: Ganj
- Telephone code: 07686
- Vehicle registration: MP-16

Gadha (also spelled Gada or Garha, pronounced Garha) is a village and gram panchayat located in Rajnagar tehsil of Chhatarpur district in the Indian state of Madhya Pradesh. Situated in the Bundelkhand region and is known as the location of Bageshwar Dham Balaji Temple, a Hindu religious complex..

== Geography ==
Gadha is situated in Rajnagar tehsil of Chhatarpur district in northeastern Madhya Pradesh. The village lies in the Bundelkhand plateau region and is surrounded by agricultural land and rural settlements. It is located on the Khajuraho–Panna road corridor and is connected by road to Rajnagar, Chhatarpur, Khajuraho and Panna.

The village benefits from connectivity through nearby national and state highways, including:

- National Highway 39 (NH 39), connecting Jhansi, Chhatarpur, Khajuraho and Panna.
- National Highway 44 (NH 44), accessible through regional road networks and serving as a major north–south transport corridor.
- State highways linking Chhatarpur district with neighbouring districts of Madhya Pradesh and Uttar Pradesh.

According to the 2011 Census of India, the village covered a geographical area of approximately 691.62 hectares.

== Demographics ==
As per the 2011 Census of India, Gadha had a population of 1,769 persons residing in 392 households. The population comprised 952 males and 817 females. Children aged 0–6 years accounted for 235 residents.

The village recorded a literacy rate of approximately 47.5 percent. Scheduled Castes and Scheduled Tribes formed a significant part of the population.

== Administration ==
Gadha is administered through a gram panchayat under the Panchayati Raj system. Gadha falls under the Rajnagar Assembly constituency and the Khajuraho Lok Sabha constituency.

== Economy ==
Agriculture is the principal occupation of the residents. Wheat, pulses and other seasonal crops are cultivated in the surrounding area.

Economic activity in the village also includes trade, transport, hospitality and other services associated with visitors to Bageshwar Dham and nearby tourist destinations in the Khajuraho region.

=== Bageshwar Dham ===
Gadha is the location of Bageshwar Dham, a Hindu religious complex dedicated to Lord Hanuman. The complex hosts religious gatherings, devotional programmes and other events throughout the year.

The complex is associated with religious preacher Dhirendra Krishna Shastri. Increased visitor numbers to the area have been accompanied by the development of roads, accommodation facilities and other local infrastructure.

On 23 February 2025, Prime Minister Narendra Modi laid the foundation stone of the Bageshwar Dham Medical and Science Research Institute in the village. The proposed healthcare facility includes a cancer treatment centre intended to serve residents of Bundelkhand and neighbouring regions.

== Transport & tourism ==
Gadha is connected by road to Rajnagar, Chhatarpur, Khajuraho and Panna.

The nearest railway stations include:

- Khajuraho railway station - the nearest major railhead with connections to Ahmedabad, Bhopal, Delhi, Kanpur, Patna, Mumbai, Varanasi and other cities.
- Chhatarpur railway station - serving the district headquarters.
- Mahoba Junction (Uttar Pradesh) - an important regional railway junction with wider connectivity to North and Central India.

The nearest airport is Khajuraho Airport, which provides air connectivity to major Indian cities. Nearby urban and tourist centres include Khajuraho, known for the Khajuraho Group of Monuments, a UNESCO World Heritage Site, and Panna, known for the Panna Tiger Reserve and diamond-bearing region of central India.
