= Dhirendra Krishna Shastri =

Hindu Katha Narrator

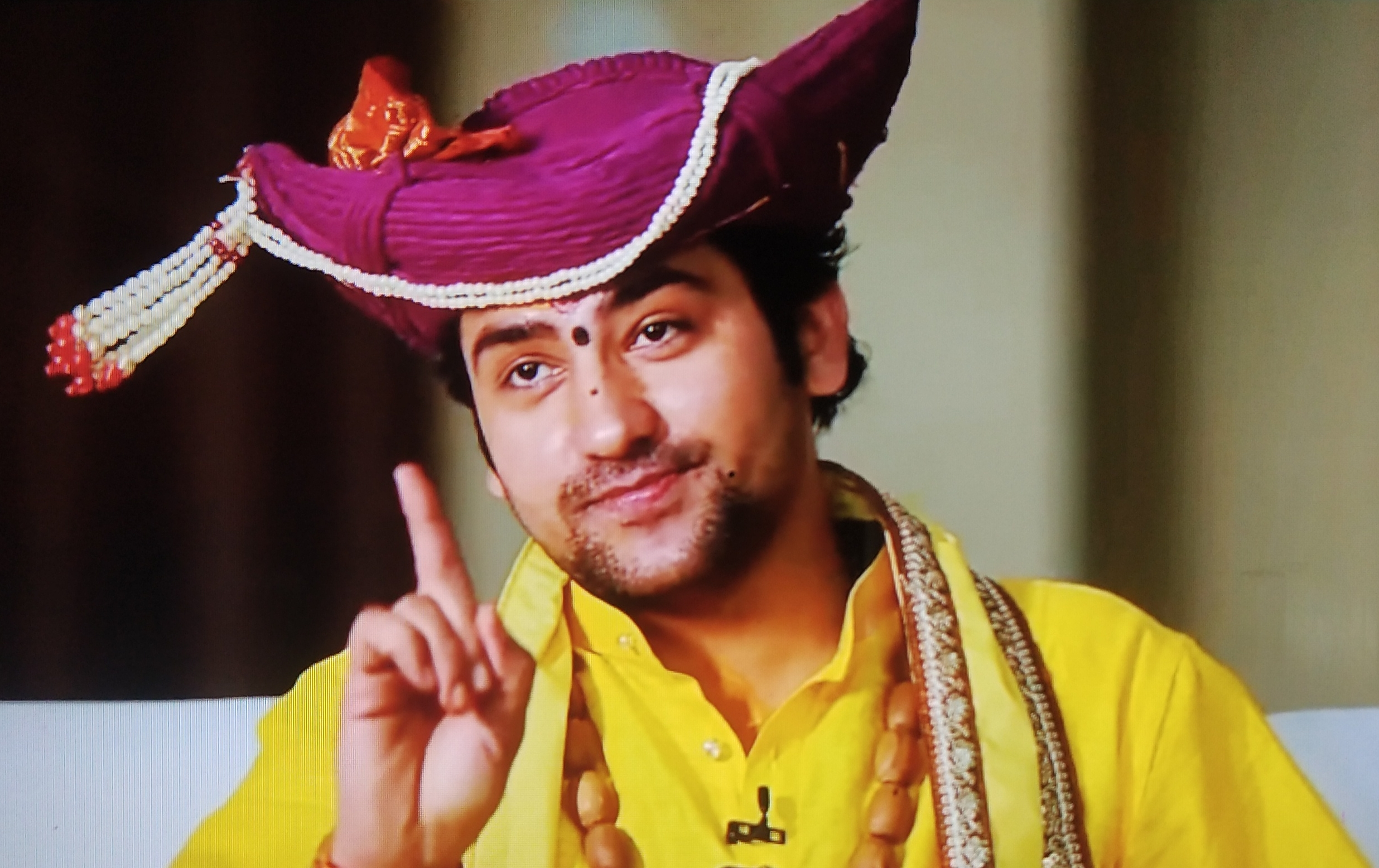
- Shastri in 2025

Personal life
- Born: Dhirendra Krishna Garg; 4 July 1996 (age 30) Chhatarpur, Madhya Pradesh, India
- Parents: Ram Kripal Garg (father); Saroj Garg (mother)
- Website: bageshwardham.co.in

Religious life
- Religion: Hinduism

Religious career
- Post: Peethadhish of the "Bageshwar Dham Sarkar"

Dhirendra Krishna Shastri (born 4 July 1996 as Dhirendra Krishna Garg) also known as Bageshwar Dham Sarkar, is an Indian self-styled godman. He is the leader of Bageshwar Dham, a religious Hindu site in Madhya Pradesh, India. Shastri has been accused of tricking people using mentalism.

== Early years ==
=== Family ===
Shastri was born on 4 July 1996 in Gada village of Chhatarpur district. He was the eldest of two children to Saroj Garg (mother) and Ram Kripal Garg (father) and was brought up in a Brahmin family in which his father worked as a priest. Shastri's childhood was marked by poverty, as his family lived in a kutcha house. As a child, he used to narrate kathas to people in his village.

=== Education ===
Shastri completed his schooling in Ganj village.

=== Religious career ===
Shastri is a disciple of Rambhadracharya. Shastri is known for his preaching of the Ramcharitmanas and Shiva Purana. He claims to possess super-natural powers achieved through sādhanā and the blessings of his great-grandfather, Sannyasi Baba, the founder of Bageshwar Dham.

== Bageshwar Dham ==
Shastri is serving as a peethadhishwar (chief) of the Bageshwar Dham, a Hindu site dedicated to the god Hanuman in Gada village in Chattarpur District, Madhya Pradesh which was established by his great-grandfather, Sannyasi Baba. Shastri organises a divya darbar at Bageshwar Dham every Tuesday and Saturday, where he purportedly conducts exorcisms, diagnoses illnesses including terminal cancers and performs other miracles. In an interview with The Lallantop Shastri said that he is the third generation serving as the chief of the dham, after his grandfather and father.

=== Social activities ===
Shastri has established the Annapurna Kitchen in his dham, where free food offerings are arranged for his followers. He also holds an annual function for the marriage of poor and destitute girls. He is establishing a Vedic Gurukula to promote ancient vedic studies and Sanskrit.

Shastri is said to have brought 300 people converted to Christianity back into Hinduism during a ghar wapsi program in 2021. On January 25, 2023, Government of Madhya Pradesh increased the security of Shastri following the death threats received by him.

=== Social media presence ===
Shastri has experienced a surge in his social media presence, boasting of a total of 7.5 million followers across various platforms. Specifically, he has garnered 3.4 million followers on Facebook, 3.9 million subscribers on YouTube, 300,000 followers on Instagram, and 72,000 followers on Twitter. Several of his widely viewed videos have garnered between three and ten million views.

== Controversies and criticism ==
=== Superstition and witchcraft allegations ===
Shastri came into focus when Indian rationalist Shyam Manav challenged him and questioned his spiritual powers. Manav also accused Shastri of promoting blind faith. When the controversy erupted in the media, Shastri invited Manav to his Divya Darbar and said, "I am just a servant at the feet of Bageshwar Balaji. I do as he inspires me".

The All India Superstition Eradication Committee (Akhil Bhartiya Andhashraddha Nirmulan Samiti) made a complaint to the Nagpur Police about Shastri under the anti-superstition act. The committee's chairman, Shyam Manav, said that witchcraft is being promoted in the guise of 'Divya Darbar' and 'Preta Darbar', and that ordinary people are being frauded, cheated, and exploited by Dhirendra Shastri in the name of religion. The police investigated this and found no grounds for prosecution under the Anti-Superstition and Black Magic Act (2013).

Many Hindu Religious leaders like Swami Ramdev, Rambhadracharya, Sadhvi Prachi, Pragya Thakur and Bharatiya Janata Party politician Giriraj Singh came to his support. He also got support from Akhil Bharatiya Akhara Parishad On 22 January 2023, several Hindu organizations called for a protest at Jantar Mantar in New Delhi in support of Bageshwar Dham Sarkar's Chief, Dhirendra Shastri. On 25 January 2023, the Nagpur Police gave a clean chit to Dhirendra Shastri against an allegation of promoting superstitious activities in his public programmes in Nagpur. Commissioner of Police Amitesh Kumar said that during an inquiry into the complaint and the examination of "evidence" submitted by complainant Shyam Manav, founder of 'Akhil Bharatiya Andhashraddha Nirmoolan Samiti', nothing was found that could attract action under the Maharashtra Anti-Superstition & Black Magic Act.

=== NCERT textbook controversy ===
Shastri claimed that a lesson titled "Chitthi Aayi Hai" in the NCERT Class 3 environmental studies textbook promotes "love jihad", an Islamophobic conspiracy theory alleging that Muslim men target Hindu women for conversion. The chapter features a letter from a girl named Reena to her friend Ahmed. He questioned why the letter was addressed to a Muslim boy and suggested that such content harms Hindu sentiments and reflects an agenda to influence young minds.

=== Medical and healing claims ===
During his Divya Darbar sessions, Shastri claims to diagnose illnesses without medical tests and to heal the sick through the blessings of Hanuman. Fact-checking website Alt News documented a 2022 video in which he advised a man to give his mother with cancer cow urine (gomutra) as a cure. In another televised session he recommended cow urine mixed with turmeric, alongside a doctor's medicines, for an infant with blood cancer. In February 2025, Prime Minister Narendra Modi laid the foundation stone of a ₹200 crore (US$21 million) cancer hospital at Bageshwar Dham.

=== Communal rhetoric ===
Alt News has accused Shastri of making divisive remarks about religious minorities. In 2022 he urged Hindus to run bulldozers over the homes of people who throw stones at Ram-related events, and in a News18 interview he promoted the "love jihad" conspiracy theory. He has said he wants a Hindu Rashtra "in the hearts" of Hindus. In November 2024, the News Broadcasting & Digital Standards Authority directed News18 to take down that interview, following a complaint that it promoted superstition. Shastri has said his speeches aim to unite Hindu society and oppose religious conversions.

=== Religious views and public reception ===
Shastri questioned the participation of Muslims in Garba and Dandiya events during Navratri in September 2026, and his remarks have added to the debate over whether participation in Garba events should be restricted based on religious identity or beliefs.

During the five day religious gathering in Ludhiana in September 2026, the Shahi Imam of Punjab asked Shastri to apologise for his remarks that he said had hurt religious sentiments. Moreover, his three day religious visit in November 2026 in Pathankot came against the backdrop of the controversy surrounding his previous visit to Punjab.

On 18 November 2026, he faced a threat from "tainted elements" within Hindu society than from external forces, asserting that he has apologised for his remarks comparing Ram and Krishna during a religious discourse in Madhya Pradesh.

== Hindu nationalism ==
On the birth anniversary of Netaji Subhash Chandra Bose on January 23, Shastri gave the slogan "Give us your support, we will give Hindu Rashtra" to declare India as a Hindu nation. He also urged that Ramcharitmanas be declared the national scripture of India. In Rajat Sharma's Aapki Adalat Show Shastri said that he respects all religions and is not against any religion but will not tolerate objectionable remarks against his religion. He also said that he will continue to raise the demand for Hindu Rashtra and Akhand Bharat.

Shastri's remarks received mixed reactions, AIMIM chief Asaduddin Owaisi opposed it citing the constitution, while Uttar Pradesh Chief Minister Yogi Adityanath endorsed his remarks and said that India is already a Hindu Rashtra.

== See also ==
- Bageshwar Dham Balaji Temple
