= Sebastian Martin =

Indian Christian Evangelist in Vasai

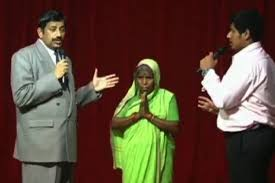
- Sebastian Martin (Left) in his Ashirwad centre.
- Died: 17 August 2016; Vasai, Mumbai, Maharashtra, India
- Education: St. Gonsalo Garcia College, Vasai
- Occupation: Evangelist
- Years active: 1998-2016
- Known for: Preaching Christian gospel
- Medical career
- Institutions: Ashirwad Prayer Centre
- Website: Official site

Sebastian Martin was a controversial Indian Christian faith healer in Vasai, Mumbai, Maharashtra. He was the founder of Ashirward Prayer Centre.

== Early career ==
He was a chartered accountant and also a lecturer in St. Gonsalo Garcia College, Vasai. On 26 January 1985, in one prayer meeting he accepted Jesus as his Lord and personal Saviour. From then, he gave his life to Jesus. In June 1998 he started Ashirwad Prayer Centre in Bhuigaon, Vasai.

== Controversy ==
In February 2016, Maharashtra Andhashraddha Nirmulan Samiti filed a complaint against Martin. Narendra Dabholkar also filed a police complaint against Martin and his associates for allegedly practicing black magic and the prayer centre was closed down but allowed to reopen after 3 months.

== Death ==
Martin died on 17 August 2016, in his residence, the cause of which was reported as complications related to diabetes.
