= Vishwas Nangare Patil =

Indian Police Service Officer

Vishwas Nangare Patil IPS, PPMG

Additional Director General of Police ( Commissioner of Police, Nagpur)
- Incumbent
- Assumed office 29 June 2026
- Preceded by: Ravindra Kumar Singal

Additional Director General of Police (Anti-Corruption Bureau, Maharashtra)
- In office 15 December 2022 – 29 June 2026
- Preceded by: Vinay Kumar Chaube
- Succeeded by: Ravindra Kumar Singal

Joint Commissioner of Police, Law & Order Mumbai (Maharashtra, India)
- In office 4 September 2020 – 15 December 2022

Special Inspector-General of Police (Aurangabad Range, Maharashtra, India)
- In office 2015–2016
- Preceded by: Amitesh Kumar
- Succeeded by: Ajit .V. Patil

Additional Commissioner of Police, Mumbai West Region

Personal details
- Born: Vishwas Narayan Nangare Patil; 1 June 1973 (age 53) Sangli, Maharashtra, India.
- Spouse: Rupali Nangare Patil
- Children: Janhavi; Ranveer
- Education: Osmania University; Shivaji University
- Occupation: Indian Police Service
- Profession: IPS Officer, Author
- Awards: President's Police Medal (gallantry)

Vishwas Narayan Nangare Patil, IPS, PPMG is an Indian Police Service officer. He serves as Commissioner of Police, Nagpur city. Previously he was Additional Director General of Police in the Anti-corruption Bureau, Maharashtra. Formerly he was Joint Commissioner of Police (Law & Order), Mumbai and Commissioner of Police, Nashik city. Patil completed his training in1997. In 2015 he was awarded the President's Police Medal (gallantry) for his role in the counterterrorist operations during the 2008 Mumbai attacks.

== Career ==
Nangare-Patil was deputy commissioner of police Zone-1 in South Mumbai during the attack. He confronted the terrorists at Taj hotel. He shot one of them in the leg. During this fight with the terrorists, they shot down one of Nangare's bodyguards and injured one. He had barged in there without any bulletproof vest only with a Glock and if he had not done it people would have died in the marriage hall known as crystal hall.

=== Positions held ===
- Commissioner of Police - Nagpur Police
- Additional Director General of Police - Anti-Corruption Bureau
- Inspector General of Police (Law and Order) - Mumbai
- Additional Commissioner of Police - Mumbai.
- Superintendent of Police - Thane Rural (2010–11).
- Superintendent of Police - Latur (2002–04)
- Additional Superintendent of Police - Nanded
- Assistant Superintendent of Police - Dhule

Special inspector general of police [IG] Kolhapur

== Books ==
- Mann Mein Hai Vishwas (Hindi).
- Kar Har Maidan Fateh (Hindi).
