= Maharashtra Prevention and Eradication of Human Sacrifice, other Inhuman and Aghori Practices and Black Magic Act, 2013 =

2013 criminal law act in Maharashtra, India

Maharashtra Prevention and Eradication of Human Sacrifice other Inhuman and Aghori Practices and Black Magic Act, 2013

Legislative Assembly
- Citation: Maharashtra Act No. XXX of 2013
- Territorial extent: Maharashtra
- Passed by: Legislative Assembly
- Passed: 13 December 2013
- Passed by: Legislative Council
- Passed: 18 December 2013
- Assented to: 20 December 2013

Legislative history

Initiating chamber: Legislative Assembly
- Bill title: Maharashtra Prevention and Eradication of Human Sacrifice, other Inhuman, and Aghori Practices and Black Magic Bill, 2013
- Introduced by: Shivajirao Moghe
- Introduced: 11 December 2013

Related legislation
- Maharashtra Ordinance No. XIV of 2013
- Status: In force

The Maharashtra Prevention and Eradication of Human Sacrifice, other Inhuman and Aghori Practices and Black Magic Act, 2013 is a criminal law act for the state of Maharashtra, India, originally drafted by anti-superstition activist and the founder of Maharashtra Andhashraddha Nirmoolan Samiti (MANS), Narendra Dabholkar (1945-2013) in 2003. The act criminalises practices related to black magic, human sacrifices, use of magic remedies to cure ailments and other such acts which may exploit people's superstitions.

The list of banned activities was continually reduced over the years. In the aftermath of Dabholkar's murder, the resulting bill was promulgated on 26 August 2013, and was formally introduced in the winter session of Maharashtra Legislative Assembly in Nagpur in December 2013.

== Overview ==
The current bill has 12 clauses which criminalise only the following acts:

"Under the pretext of removing a bhoot (ghost) from a person’s body, tying that person with a rope or a chain or a stick, assaulting them or asking them to drink water soaked in footwear, hang[ing] the person to the roof, pluck[ing] their hair, ask[ing] them to touch heated objects or forc[ing] them to conduct [a] sexual act in the open or forc[ing] the intake of urine or stool.

2. Mak[ing] financial profits by displaying so called miracles. Cheat[ing] and terroris[ing] people with the aid of such miracles.

3. With the objective of attaining supernatural powers, do[ing] something or ask[ing] others to do something that might cause injuries or risk to life.

4. At the pretext of searching for hidden treasure or water source do[ing] something that is inhuman, gruesome and ask[ing] or encourag[ing] or suggest[ing] for human life as prashad.

5. Creat[ing] a feeling of fear by giving an impression of having supernatural power or pretending that someone else has such powers or threaten[ing] that evil will befall if he/she doesn’t obey the person having such powers.

6. Creating suspicion about a person claiming that he/she performs black magic through which he/she carries evil practices and makes life difficult for that person or declar[ing] that a person is a Satan or form of Satan.

7. Beating up a person or hav[ing] a procession of a naked woman saying she is a witch or restrict[ing] her routine.

8. Threatening to invite a ghost and creating fear in the mind and misguiding people by claiming to cure a disease with the help of mantras [and] preventing medical aid.

9. Preventing medical aid and instead claiming to cure a person bitten by snake, dog or scorpion by chanting mantras or by tying threads or similar things.

10. Claiming to change the sex of the foetus in the womb by inserting fingers.

11. Giving an impression that one has supernatural powers or that the devotee was his/ her wife/ husband or paramour in past birth thereby indulging in sexual activity with such person. Having sex with a woman yearning for a child claiming to make her pregnant with supernatural powers.

12. Claiming that a differently abled person has supernatural power and using him or her for business purpose."

Although the human sacrifice is already considered murder in India, encouraging human sacrifice has been criminalised in this law. Each infraction carries a minimum sentence of six months and a maximum sentence of seven years, including a fine ranging from ₹5,000 to ₹50,000. The offences are non-bailable and cognisable.

The law directs the appointment and training of vigilance officers, to investigate and report these crimes to the local police station. The ranks of these officers are to be greater than the rank of a police inspector.

== History ==
The original bill of 2003 was drafted by Narendra Dabholkar. In July 2003, the draft was approved by the state government. The bill was sent for ratification to the Central Government by Chief Minister of Maharashtra Sushilkumar Shinde in August 2003. However, it was criticised for having poor definitions of terms like superstition, black magic, spells, sorcery etc. The bill was not presented in the winter session of the legislature.

The bill was revised and redrafted by rationalist Shyam Manav. This draft was presented as Maharashtra Eradication of Black Magic, Evil and Aghori Practices Bill, 2005.

The bill was introduced for the first time in the Legislative Assembly in the winter session of 2005. The bill, was adopted by the Assembly on 16 December 2006, the last day of the session. The ruling Indian National Congress (INC) government faced criticism from the lack of debate from the opposition Bharatiya Janata Party (BJP) and Shiv Sena.

In 2006 there were protests against the bill, including at a demonstration in Pune on 25 February 2006. Protesters, including the Art of Living Foundation and Hindu Janajagruti Samiti (HJS) claimed the bill gave the police power to search, seize or arrest on mere suspicion. Shyam Manav, president, Akhil Bharatiya Andhshraddha Nirmulan Samiti (ABANS), a major force behind the Bill, refuted these claims: "Under IPC, if anyone is obstructing the work of cops, he can be punished. We have made a comprehensive Bill to weed out crimes against people due to superstition." At the rally a spokesperson for Janajagruti Samiti, Ramesh Shinde, said that the bill was redundant, violated religious freedom and did not acknowledge divine power. I. A. Khan, the caretaker of the Haji Malang Dargah, agreed and added that the bill was influenced by "foreign ideas".

The bill was not presented in the 2006 monsoon session. A Congress MLA on the condition of anonymity acknowledged that they didn't want to upset their constituencies ahead of the elections.

In 2007, instead of being sent to the second house of the legislature, the Legislative Council of Maharashtra, it was forwarded to an investigative committee.

In July 2008, volunteers from the Maharashtra Andhashraddha Nirmoolan Samiti (MANS) staged a protest in Mumbai to draw attention to the bill, where the protesters slapped themselves. They claimed that it was to remind themselves that, they had elected the wrong representatives who were not interested in the people's welfare.

On 8 November 2010, Narhari Maharaj Chaudhari, the Secretary of Maharashtra State Warkari Mahamandal representing the Warkaris, criticised the bill in a press conference stating that it has no clear definition of mental and physical torture. He also stated that it could be used to criminalise every Hindu ritual. He claimed the bill to be redundant as human sacrifice already comes under Indian Penal Code. He defended the Wakari ritual of wari and called for the bill to be scrapped.

On 5 April 2011, Dabholkar, talking at a press conference, criticised television programmes promoting superstitions and called for the bill to be passed. A rally was held at Azad Maidan on 7 April to awareness about the bill. On 7 April 2011, Deputy Chief Minister of Maharashtra Ajit Pawar stated that the bill will be introduced in the budget session while responding to MLA Chainsukh Sancheti's queries about child sacrifices. Pawar clarified that the bill will not affect Wakari rituals or any other religious rites.

On 7 July 2011, MANS secretary Milind Deshmukh and Dabholkar stated that an anti-superstition bill had been promised by the government since 7 July 1995 but never passed. They started a telegram-sending campaign to draw attention to the issues and also urged local leaders to send telegrams to the Chief Minister.

On 20 August 2013, Narendra Dabholkar, the architect and lead campaigner behind the bill, was shot dead, while he was out on a walk. His death triggered protests and demands for the bill to be passed were made.

On 21 August 2013, the Maharashtra government approved the bill as an ordinance. On 24 August 2013, K. Sankaranarayanan, the Governor of Maharashtra signed the ordinance. The ordinance will remain in effect until December 2013, when it will be tabled at the winter session of the state legislature. As of August 2013, the bill has been tabled thrice in the Legislative Assembly and had failed to pass each times, and has undergone 29 amendments.

On 4 September 2013, the ordinance was used for the first time to arrest two individuals in the Nanded district, who had advertised miracles cures for AIDS, cancer and diabetes in a newspaper. Members of MANS helped the police understand which clause would be applicable. On 8 September 2013, a man claiming to be an avatar of Krishna was arrested in Kandivali under this ordinance. He was also charged under the Protection of Children from Sexual Offenses Act (POCSO) for molestation.

The bill to enact the law was titled the Maharashtra Prevention and Eradication of Human Sacrifice and other Inhuman, Evil and Aghori Practices and Black Magic Bill 2013, also known as the Anti-Superstition Bill, Black Magic Bill, Anti-Jaadu Tona Bill or Jadu Tona Andhshradha Virodhi Bill. It was introduced in the Maharashtra Legislative Assembly on 11 December 2013 by State Social Justice Minister Shivajirao Moghe. The bill was passed by the Legislative Assembly on 13 December and by the Legislative Council on 18 December 2013. The bill received assent from Governor Sankaranarayanan on 20 December 2013.

Being a state law, the bill enacted into law applies only in the comparatively well-off and well-educated state of Maharashtra. In the rest of India the population remains without comparable protection from fraudulent pretend-healers and other miracle fakers. Narendra Dalbholkar's daughter, Mukta, and other activists continue his campaign for a national-wide anti-superstition law.

== Criticism and support ==
The bill has been criticised for being Anti-Hindu and anti-religion.

Dabholkar had responded to the criticism of the bill being anti-religious by stating that the bill does not mention any god or religion, and that it only targets fraudulent practices.

Manav said that the Wakari sect will not find the bill objectionable, further saying that the law does not prohibit a person from performing a miracle. However, it is a crime if a person claims to perform a miracle and cheats someone.

In the aftermath of Dabholkar's murder, journalist Ellen Barry wrote an article for The New York Times (NYT) about the murder and interviewed a sociologist at the University of Pune about the bill, who explained that the bill had been continually watered down over the years, due to rising opposition from a few Hindus and stating:

What today stands as the draft legislation is a much mellowed-down position. It is a slippery area that we are talking about — what is faith, and what is blind faith. There is a thin line dividing it.

== Other state laws ==
In the lines of the Maharashtra Anti-Superstition and Black Magic Act, the State of Karnataka also passed the bill in 2017 was notified in 2020.

In Gujarat the Public Interest Litigation was filed seeking directions to curb inhuman and aghori practices being violative of Fundamental rights of citizens. After issuance of notice, the Gujarat Government had filed the reply before the Court stating that they will move the bill before the assembly. Public Interest Litigation was filed before Gujarat High Court Gujarat Prevention and Eradication of Human Sacrifice and Other Inhuman, Evil and Aghori Practices and Black Magic Bill, 2024 was unanimously passed in State Assembly and is enacted as The Gujarat Prevention and Eradication of Human Sacrifice and Other Inhuman, Evil and Aghori Practices and Black Magic Act, 2024.

== See also ==
- Godman (India)
- Superstition in India
- Drugs and Magic Remedies (Objectionable Advertisements) Act, 1954
