= Govind Pansare =

Indian political activist and writer (1933–2015)

- Govind Pansare
- Born: 24 November 1933; Kolhar, Ahmednagar district, Bombay Province, British India (now Maharashtra, India)
- Died: 20 February 2015 (aged 81); Mumbai, Maharashtra, India
- Cause of death: Assassination (gunshot wounds)
- Occupations: Marxist; lawyer; author; activist
- Political party: Communist Party of India

Govind Pansare (26 November 1933 – 20 February 2015) was a left-wing Indian politician of the Communist Party Of India (CPI). He authored the Marathi language biography of 17th century ruler Shivaji, Shivaji Kon Hota (literally, Who was Shivaji?). He and his wife were attacked on 16 February 2015 by gun-wielding assailants in Kolhapur district of Maharashtra. He died from his wounds on 20 February 2015.

== Early life ==
Govind Pandharinath Pansare was born on 26 November 1933 in Kolhar village, Shrirampur taluka, Ahmednagar district, Maharashtra. He was the youngest of five siblings. His mother, Harnabai, was a Farmworker and his father Pandharinath worked odd jobs. They lost their land to the moneylenders and lived in poverty.

== Career ==
=== Education and politics ===
Pansare joined the local branch of Rashtra Seva Dal, a local socialist group founded by Pandurang Sadashiv Sane. A member of the organisation, Govind Patki, helped Pansare get admission to a high school in Rahuri. Pansare was introduced to Communism in his school days. He helped the election campaign of communist candidate P. B. Kadu Patil in the assembly elections. Pansare then moved to Kolhapur district for further education. There he was joined by Patki who was a native of that district. In 1952, he joined the Communist Party of India (CPI).

While studying in the Rajaram College, Kolhapur, he used to visit a book shop called The Republic Bookstall, which was run by left-wing activists. There he read various books on the left ideologies. He participated in Samyukta Maharashtra Movement and the Goa liberation movement. After completing his Bachelor of Arts, he studied law in Shahaji Law College and completed his LLB. In 1962, he was arrested during the Sino-Indian War, as he was a communist and was seen as a China-sympathiser. In 1964, he began practicing in the field of labour law. He represented various labour unions and slum dwellers. In 1964, when the Communist Party of India (CPI) split, he stayed with the parent party. He later became a state secretary of the CPI and a member of CPI's national executive.

=== Activism ===
Pansare used to run an organisation which encouraged inter-caste marriages. He had opposed the Putrakameshti yajna, a Hindu ritual that supposedly results in a male child. He had protested toll taxes. He had also criticised the glorification of Nathuram Godse, the man who killed Mahatma Gandhi.

After the murder of Narendra Dabholkar, the anti-superstition activist, Pansare had asked the members of Maharashtra Andhashraddha Nirmoolan Samiti to continue his work.

== Personal life ==
He had three children. His son Avinash was a lawyer and also active in left politics, but died young. He has two daughters, Smita and Megha. His daughter-in-law Megha Pansare is Assistant Professor in Russian language at the Shivaji University, Kolhapur. She is also an activist of CPI, now holds the position of President, Kolhapur District, National Federation of Indian Women (NFIW). Pansare was a rationalist.

== Books ==
Pansare has written 21 books, most of them commentaries on social wrongs. Shivaji Kon Hota? (Marathi for Who was Shivaji) is considered his most notable work. It was based on a speech he gave in May 1987. It was a counter to the ideology of Hindutva organisations and right-wing organisations like Shiv Sena, for whom the Shivaji is icon. Pansare said in his book that Shivaji in reality was a secular leader who appointed Muslims as his generals. He also pointed out that Shivaji respected women, abolished serfdom and also appointed to prominent posts. The book has been translated into Hindi, English, Tamil, Kannada, Malayalam, Urdu and Gujarati. Since its first print in 1988, the book has seen 38 editions, with each print run being of 3000 to 5000 copies. It has sold over 145,000 copies.

== Death ==
On 16 February 2015, at 9:25 am, Pansare and his wife Uma were returning from their morning walk from their society. Two men on a motorcycle shot at them five times from a close range outside their house. Pansare was injured in his nape and chest. His wife was injured in her head.

Both were taken to the Aster Aadhar Hospital by their daughter-in-law and grandsons. After surgery, the condition of both was reported to have improved but they remained critical. Uma regained consciousness the same day but Pansare remained in a coma. He regained consciousness on 17 February.

On 20 February 2015, Pansare was airlifted to the Breach Candy Hospital, Mumbai after swelling in his lungs was reported. On the same day, Pansare succumbed to his injuries at the Breach Candy Hospital. The modus operandi of the attackers was similar to that used by the criminals who killed activist Narendra Dabholkar in a separate morning attack in Maharashtra in August 2013. Pansare's funeral took place on 21 February. His wife was discharged from hospital on 4 March 2015.

=== Reactions ===
After the attack, Chief Minister of Maharashtra, Devendra Fadnavis, said the police were trying to apprehend the attackers and road blocks had been established. Hamid Dabholkar, son of murdered activist Narendra Dabholkar, said that if police had solved his father's murder case, it would have acted as a deterrent and Pansare would not have been attacked. Sharad Pawar, leader of Nationalist Congress Party, said this was an attempt to silence the people who speak against extremists. Manikrao Thakare, an Indian National Congress leader, said that the attacks on Dabholkar and Pansare were a bad sign for the freedom of speech in Maharashtra. After Pansare's death, the sales of his books increased.

On the other hand, the Additional director general of police, K. L. Bishnoi, said that there were no connections between the Dabholkar and Pansare case, except that both of them were morning walkers. Hamid Dabholkar criticised the statement pointing out both Dabholkar and Pansare were rationalists and opponents of right-wing extremism, and had been threatened several times.

=== Investigation ===
On 16 February 2015, after the attack, an attempt to murder case was filed in the Rajarampuri police station. The police said that no eyewitnesses had come forward and they were checking the CCTV footages from the area. B. G. Kolse Patil, a retired judge, said that in December 2014, Pansare had received threats after he organised an event. At the event there was a discussion about the book Who killed Karkare?. The book was written by a retired policeman, S. M. Mushrif.

On 18 February 2015, an activist, Ketan Tirodkar, filed a Public Interest Litigation (PIL) in the Bombay High Court claiming that police had known about threats to his life and had failed to act. He also pointed out the similarities to Narendra Dabholkar's murder. On 22 February, the police announced a reward of INR 500,000 for information leading to the capture of the attackers. On 28 February, the ballistic report said that five bullets from two revolvers were fired at Pansare. The guns were different from those used in the Dabholkar case.

On 4 March 2015, the police said that they prepared sketches, which they showed to his wife. By this time the reward money had been increased five-fold, from Rupees 500,000 to Rupees 2.5 million. Due to a fractured skull, his wife had trouble recollecting the event.

On 15 March, Uma Pansare was interviewed by the police. She said the attackers were two young men on a motorcycle. One of them had asked for the directions to a house in Marathi, "More kuthe rahtat?" (Where does More live?). Govind Pansare replied that he did not know any such person. The person riding pillion began laughing. Then when the shooting started Uma Pansare fainted. She could not recall the make of the motorcycle or their faces. On 16 March 2015, another left-wing leader, Bharat Patankar, received a similar threat letter. He was given police security.

=== Arrests ===
On 16 September 2015, one Sameer Gaikwad, 32, was arrested from Sangli. According to the police, Gaikwad owned a mobile repair shop and was a member of the Sanatan Sanstha group since 1998. The police said that the Gaikwad resembled one of the person captured on the CCTV footage and so they had started tapping his phone. The arrests came after Gaikwad allegedly boasted about the murder to a female friend on the phone. One 17 September 2015, the police arrested four more persons – a woman from Mumbai, presumed to be Gaikwad's girlfriend; a man from Pune; and two men from Goa.

On 20 September 2015, Maharashtra and Karnataka Police began a joint manhunt for a man called Rudra Patil. Patil was also a Sanatan Sanstha member and is an accused in the 2009 Goa blast case.

During investigation Maharashtra found that Sameer Gaikwad was in different city (Thane) around the time of the murder of Govind Pansare. During police investigation no evidence could be found against Sameer Gaikwad or Sanatan Sanstha in the assassination of Govind Pansare. Minister of state for home Mr. Ranjit Patil also confirmed this. Further to this court also rejected request of brainmapping / Lie detection test of Sameer Gaikwad.

Karnataka Police could not find any evidence against Sameer Gaikwad on his role in the M. M. Kalburgi murder. Hence, Criminal Investigation Department (CID) decided not to file a petition seeking custody of Sameer Gaikwad.

== In popular culture ==
The assassination is featured along with assassinations of other rationalists such as Narendra Dabholkar, M. M. Kalburgi and journalist Gauri Lankesh in the documentary mini-series Vivek-Reason by Anand Patwardhan.

Short film The Bookshelf was produced in the memory of Narendra Dabholkar, Govind Pansare and M. M. Kalburgi by three Indian publishing houses Tulika Books, Perumal Murugan's publisher Kalachuvadu and Deshabhimani Book House.

== Bibliography ==
- शिवाजी कोण होता? (in Marathi). Lokvangmay Griha.
- धर्म जात वर्ग आणि परिवर्तनाच्या दिशा (in Marathi). Lokvangmay Griha.
- व्दि-वर्ण शिक्षण व्यवस्था (in Marathi). श्रमिक प्रतिष्ठान.
- मार्क्सवादाची तोंड ओळख (in Marathi). Lokvangmay Griha.
- मुस्लिमांचे लाड (in Marathi). Lokvangmay Griha.
- राजश्री शाहू वसा आणि वारसा (in Marathi). Lokvangmay Griha.
- काश्मीरबाबतच्या कलम ३७० ची कुळकथा (in Marathi). श्रमिक प्रतिष्ठान.
- महाराष्ट्राची आर्थिक पाहणी – पर्यायी दृष्टिकोन (in Marathi). श्रमिक प्रतिष्ठान.
- मार्क्सवादाची तोंडोओळख (in Marathi). श्रमिक प्रतिष्ठान.
- मुस्लिमांचे लाड (in Marathi). सुगावा प्रकाशन.

== See also ==
- Narendra Dabholkar, a rationalist who was killed in a similar manner
- Satish Shetty, an activist who was killed in a similar manner
- M. M. Kalburgi, a scholar killed in a similar manner
- Gauri Lankesh, a journalist-activist who was killed in a similar manner
