= Devdatta Dabholkar =

Indian educationalist and thinker (1919–2010)

- Born: 23 September 1919; Kolhapur, India
- Died: 17 December 2010 (aged 91); Satara, Maharashtra, India
- Education: Elphinstone College, Mumbai
- Occupations: Educationist; Thinker, Gandhian; Socialist
- Notable work: A Pilot Survey of Shirur Taluka, Climbing a Wall of Glass: Higher Education in India, Contemporary Relevance of Gandhi
- Relatives: Narendra Dabholkar (brother)

Devdatta Dabholkar (Devnagari: देवदत्त दाभोलकर; 23 September 1919 – 17 December 2010) was an Indian educationist, thinker, a Gandhian and a socialist, he participated in the movements for social change that took place in India after it gained independence.

== Life ==
Dabholkar was born on 23 September 1919 at Kolhapur, he was the eldest of ten siblings. He topped the Mumbai University matriculation examination in 1936, he secured his Masters of Arts degree, from Elphinstone College, Mumbai, and he held many important positions in his career. Dabholkar died on 17 December 2010, at Satara where he lived since 1990. He was the brother of Dr. Narendra Dabholkar a medical doctor and social activist.

== Positions held ==
Dabholkar started his career as a professor in Sangli's Willingdon College in 1944, later he became founder principal Chintamanrao Patwardhan College – Sangli (1960–1968) Among the other positions he held were principal Willingdon College – Sangli, principal Fergusson College – Pune, principal Kirti M.Doongursee College – Mumbai, Vice Chancellor – University of Pune (1975–1978), Director Indian Institute of Education, Pune, (1978–1981), member of The task force on educational finance set up by the Department of Education, member of the Educational planning, administration and devaluation committee set up by the Planning Commission of India, he was a member of Pradnya Pathshala, Wai, and the editor of its journal Navbharat.

== Books ==
Among the books written by him are A pilot survey of Shirur Taluka – Agro-Industrial Balance, Climbing a wall of Glass: Higher education in Indian, Contemporary relevance of Gandhi, Management of productivity and efficiency of education, Socioeconomic survey of the college teachers in the Poona university area, Sardar Sarovar Debate, O Narmada, Democratic Socialism, Equality of Opportunity in education, Problems in economic development, The challenge of the Chinese aggression, Gandhian economics, Economic planning in India.
