= Museum of Goa =

Private contemporary art gallery in Goa, India

Coordinates: 15.5255°N 73.7953°E

- Type: Private
- Industry: Contemporary art gallery
- Founded: November 2015
- Founder: Subodh Kerkar
- Headquarters: Pilerne Industrial Estate, near Calangute, Goa, India
- Website: museumofgoa.com

The Museum of Goa (MOG), is a privately owned contemporary art gallery in Pilerne Industrial Estate, near Calangute, Goa, India. Founded in 2015, it is 1,500 square meters in size. It has no permanent collection. It was founded by Goan artist Subodh Kerkar. The museum organises various exhibitions, art courses, plays, residencies, workshops, book readings, lectures, screenings and talks.

== History ==
Kerkar had purchased this land more than 20 years ago when the government was trying to attract people to set up industries in the area. Later, when he got a notice from the government since his land was not utilized, he decided to start the museum. For this, he sold another piece of land and received INR 3.5 crore that was used to create the museum.

The three-storey gallery building was designed by Dean D'Cruz, and was completed in 2015 on the site of Kerkar's former studio. A sculpture garden at the site is present. Mog, the acronym for the museum, and a Konkani word, translates to "love".

The gallery opened on 6 November 2015 with an exhibition entitled 'Gopalapatanam', of work by 20 Indian artists – including Kerkar – on the topic of Goan history. Invitations to visit MOG were mailed to schools and colleges in the city.

== Exhibitions ==
Dutch artist Karin van der Molen's work Mind Bubbles was shown at MOG.
