= Madhavi Sardesai =

Indian academic (1962–2014)

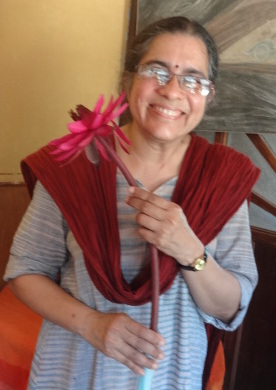
- Sardesai in 2013
- Born: 7 July 1962; Lisbon, Portugal
- Died: 22 December 2014 (aged 52); Margao, Goa, India
- Citizenship: India (from parents)
- Education: Parvatibai Chowgule College (M.A.); Goa University (Ph.D)
- Occupations: Academic; editor; scholar; writer
- Spouse: Raju Naik
- Children: 2
- Relatives: Ravindra Kelekar (uncle); Vijai Sardesai (brother); Subodh Kerkar (brother-in-law)
- Awards: Sahitya Akademi Translation Prize (1998)

Madhavi Sardesai (7 July 1962 – 22 December 2014) was an Indian academic and the editor of the Konkani literary journal Jaag. She was also a scholar, publisher and writer who worked mainly in the Konkani language in Goa. She headed the Goa University's Konkani Department. Sardesai died on 22 December 2014 from cancer.

== Early life and education ==
Madhavi Sardesai was born on 7 July 1962 to entomologist Jaywant Sardesai and his wife Lakshmi. Vijai Sardesai is her brother while her sister, Savita Kerkar, is married to Subodh Kerkar. Jnanpith Award-winner Ravindra Kelekar was her uncle.

Sardesai undertook her primary education through the Konkani medium, and graduated from Parvatibai Chowgule College, Margao in English and Philosophy. She had a Master of Arts degree (M.A). in linguistics, and presented work on 'Some Aspects of Konkani Grammar' for her MPhil degree. Her PhD was from Goa University's Department of English for her thesis on A Comparative Linguistic and Cultural Study of Lexical Influences on Konkani.

Sardesai was married to Raju Nayak, editor of Lokmat's Goa edition. Together, they have two daughters, Asawari and Aditi.

== Career ==
Sardesai has worked on the topic of the Portuguese influence on Konkani language and the "linguistic genius" of Shenoi Goembab. She published research papers on the Konkani language, literature and linguistics and also wrote poems, essays, and short-stories. She served as the Executive Editor of the Jaag monthly and was its editor since August 2007.

== Death ==
Sardesai died on 22 December 2014, at Margao, Goa, India.

== Bibliography ==
- Bhasa-Bhas a book on linguistics.
- Eka Vicharachi Jivit Katha (Eternal Story of a Thought)
- Mankullo Raj Kunvor, a translation of the children's novelette, The Little Prince, from French into Konkani
- Manthan (collection of essays)

== Awards ==
Sardesai won the award of Sahitya Akademi, Delhi for creative writing in Konkani (2014) for her book, Manthan. Earlier, She was awarded the 1998 Sahitya Akademi Translation Prize for her translation, Eka Vicharachi Jivit Katha.
