= M. M. Kalburgi =

Indian scholar and writer (1938–2015)

- Born: 28 November 1938; Yargal, Bombay Province, British India (now in Karnataka, India)
- Died: 30 August 2015 (aged 76); Dharwad, Karnataka, India
- Cause of death: Assassination

Academic background
- Education: Karnatak University

Academic work
- Main interests: Vachana sahitya
- Notable works: Kavirajamarga Parisarada Kannada Sahitya, Maarga (in 6 volumes)

Malleshappa Madivalappa Kalburgi (28 November 1938 – 30 August 2015) was an Indian scholar of Vachana sahitya (Vachana literature) in the Kannada language and an academic who served as the vice-chancellor of Kannada University in Hampi. A noted epigraphist of Kannada, he was awarded the National Sahitya Akademi Award in 2006 for Marga 4, a collection of his research articles.

Kalburgi was a well known scholar among Lingayat community. Kalburgi's life work has been to provide insights and raise new perspectives into the Lingayat history and community, which have many times led to controversy and opposition from other members of the Lingayat community that he was member of.

Kalburgi was shot dead in the morning of 30 August 2015 at his residence in Dharwad district of Karnataka by two unidentified men.

== Early life and education ==
M. M. Kalburgi was born on 28 November 1938 in Yaragal village of the erstwhile Bombay Presidency (now in Sindagi taluk of Bijapur district, Karnataka) of British India. His parents Madivalappa and Gowramma were farmers. He received his primary education from government schools in Yaragal and Sindagi, and high school education from a school in Bijapur. He graduated with a Bachelor of Arts degree from a college in Bijapur after which he acquired a post-graduate degree in Kannada language from Karnatak University, Dharwad, in 1962, with a gold medal.

== Career ==
After completing his M.A. in Kannada as a gold medalist, Kalburgi joined Karnataka University as a Kannada lecturer for post-graduate students. In 1966, he was promoted to Professor in the Kannada Department. In 1982, he became the Head of the department. He then became the chairperson of the Basaveshwara Peetha. He received a PhD in Kannada for his thesis titled "Kavirājamārgada Parisaradalli Kannaḍa Sāhitya" (Kannada literature in the environs of Kavirajamarga).

Kalburgi was a noted Kannada epigraphist and a renowned scholar of the Vachana sahitya. He was the editor of the comprehensive volumes of Vachana literature and involved in translating them into 22 languages.

Kalburgi authored 103 books and over 400 articles. He is well known for his Marga series of books. Although Marga 1 faced some controversies, Marga 4 earned him the Karnataka Sahitya Academy Award, and the national Sahitya Academi Award in 2006.

In his later years, he served as the vice-chancellor of the Kannada University, Hampi, before retiring from service. As the vice-chancellor of the Kannada University, Kalburgi started several research projects including the one recording the history of kaifiyats, Adil Shahi literature, ancient poets, and lesser known royal families. His research also focused on the 12th century Sharana movement. For his research on manuscripts, he went to London, Cambridge and Oxford universities.

Kalburgi was the chief editor of Samagra Vachana Samputa which was published by the Government of Karnataka. He had also worked as chairman of the Da Ra Bendre National Memorial Trust and member of the Kannada Sahitya Academy's advisory board.

== Controversies ==
=== The Marga 1 controversy ===
In 1989, Kalburgi was forced by the Lingayat temple chiefs to recant the allegedly derogatory references to the founder of Lingayat sect, Basava, his wife and sister. The controversy was about two articles in his book Marga 1. In the first, Kalburgi examined several vachanas (poems) written by Basaveshwara's second wife Neelambike and concluded that her relationship with her husband may have been only platonic. In the other article, he pointed out the obfuscation by historians of the birth of Channabasava, another Lingayath poet. Kalburgi, relying on historical records, argued that Channabasava could be the product of Basava's sister Nagalambike's marriage to Dohara Kakkaya, the cobbler-poet. After recanting his views, Kalburgi had said, "I did it to save the lives of my family. But I also committed intellectual suicide on that day."

=== Idol worship controversy ===
In June 2014, addressing a seminar on Anti-superstition Bill in Bangalore, Kalburgi cited U. R. Ananthamurthy's 1996 book Bethale Puje Yake Kuradu, ("Why nude-worship is wrong") in which the writer narrated his childhood experience of urinating on idols as an experiment to see whether there would be divine retribution. Some people misinterpreted it as being against idolatry in Hinduism. Following which a case was registered on the basis of a private complaint by an individual against Kalburgi for hurting religious sentiments. and leading to protests from the right-wing groups, Vishva Hindu Parishad, Bajrang Dal and Sri Ram Sena against both the writers.

== Assassination ==
Having faced death threats previously, Kalburgi had demanded security from the ruling Indian National Congress government of Karnataka, but had not been provided with it initially. On having had "special protection" for a few days, he requested the police to have that removed in August 2015. On the morning of 20 August 2013 another activist for scientific understanding, Narendra Dabholkar, was gunned down by shots to his head and chest fired at point blank range by two men who escaped on a motorcycle.

On 30 August 2015, two men on a motorcycle came to the residence of Kalburgi in the Kalyan Nagar locality of Dharwad and knocked on his door. Kalburgi's wife Umadevi answered the door, and the two men posed as students of Kalburgi. She went inside to fetch coffee for them, but at 8:40 a.m. IST, one of the men fired two rounds at point blank range, striking Kalburgi's chest and forehead, while the other waited outside keeping the motorcycle running. Immediately following the shooting the assassins fled the scene on the motorcycle. An ambulance was called and attempts were made to resuscitate Kalburgi. He was first taken to a private hospital and then to the District Civil Hospital of Dharwad, where the doctors declared that he had died en route. His body was cremated in Dharwad on 31 August.

=== Reactions ===
Kalburgi's assassination was condemned by many political leaders and social activists. The Karnataka Chief Minister Siddaramaiah reacted to the murder calling Kalburgi a "progressive thinker" and said that the government had treated the incident "very seriously", and that culprits would be traced soon and "strictest punishment" would be meted out in accordance with law. Protests by a group of writers following the murder took place in Bangalore, led by playwright Girish Karnad. Protests led by pro-Kannada organizations, students and activists took place in other parts of Karnataka subsequently. Also, as a mark of protest, noted writers Uday Prakash and Chandrashekhar Patil decided to return their Sahitya Akademi Award and Pampa Awards. In October 2015, writer Nayantara Sahgal also returned Sahitya Akademi Award citing his murder among other incidents with people being "killed for not agreeing with the ruling [party's] ideology." Shashi Deshpande, K. Satchidanandan, P.K. Parakkadvu, and Aravind Malagatti resigned from the Akademi office. A number of Kannada writers also returned their Karnataka Sahitya Akademy Awards in October 2015. About forty national Akademi awardees returned their awards, upon which the Akademi requested the recipients to keep their awards.

Kalburgi was a progressive voice among Lingayat. Kalburgi's life work had been to provide insights and raise new perspectives into the Lingayat history and community, which have many times led to controversy and opposition from other members of the powerful Lingayat community that he was a member of. K. M. Marulsidappa states "Kalburgi's murder is less likely to implicate conventional Hindutva groups, and more likely to involve the fine rivalries and high political stakes within Lingayat caste politics." Writer H.S Anupama says "His research work on the Lingayat community, the Vachanas and the Shaiva-Vaishnava clash had created ideological enemies to him within the community."

=== Investigation ===
Investigations began on 30 August, the day of the murder. A special team of five inspectors, headed by an Assistant commissioner, was formed by the Hubli–Dharwad Police. Initial investigations revealed that there were no eyewitnesses to the incident. A CCTV footage retrieved from the area found "two youths aged between 24 and 28, wearing black clothes and riding a motorcycle". The police retrieved two empty cartridges from the crime scene and said an improvised firearm with 7.65 mm caliber bullets was used in the murder. Having not found any leads, the police, on 31 August, decided to hand over the case to Central Bureau of Investigation (CBI). However, till the time the formalities would be completed, the police said that investigations would be carried out by Crime Investigation Department (CID). The investigations stretched to include a property dispute within Kalburgi's close family circle which had been successfully settled after he had intervened. On 2 September, Karnataka Police released sketches of the two suspects to the press, based on accounts by Umadevi, Kalburgi's wife, and "another person who had a glimpse of them." The sketches as published in The Hindu reveal the two faces with almost photographic clarity.

== Works ==
Kalburgi is the author of over 20 publications, including:

- Kavirajamarga Parisarada Kannada Sahitya
- Marga (in 6 volumes)
- Neeru Neeradisittu
- Sarangarshi
- Kettitthu Kalyan
- Republic of Reason: Words They Could Not Kill – Selected Writings of Dabholkar, Pansare and Kalburgi. (2015), Sahmat

== Awards ==
- Karnataka Sahitya Academy Award (2006) for Marga 4
- Kendra (Central) Sahitya Akademi Award
- Janapad Award
- Yakshagana Award
- Pampa Award
- Nrupatunga Award
- Ranna Award
- Basava Puraskara (2013)
- Nadoja Award

== In popular culture ==
Kalburgi's assassination is featured along with those of other progressive social reformers such as Narendra Dabholkar, Govind Pansare and journalist Gauri Lankesh in the documentary miniseries Reason by Anand Patwardhan.

A short film, The Bookshelf, was produced in memory of Dabholkar, Pansare and Kalburgi by three Indian publishing houses: Tulika Books, Perumal Murugan's publisher Kalachuvadu and Deshabhimani Book House.

== See also ==
- Superstition in India
- Narendra Dabholkar
- Govind Pansare
- Gauri Lankesh
