= Bageshwari, Bhaktapur =

Village Development Committee in Bagmati Zone, Nepal

Coordinates: 27°42′N 85°29′E

Bageshwari वागेश्वरी
- Village Development Committee
- Interactive map of Bageshwari
- Country: Nepal
- Zone: Bagmati Zone
- District: Bhaktapur District

Population (2011)
  - Total: 5,385
  - Religions: Hindu
- Time zone: UTC+5:45 (Nepal Time)

Bageshwari (Nepali: वागेश्वरी)is a village and Village Development Committee in Bhaktapur District in the Bagmati Zone of central Nepal. At the time of the 2011 Nepal census it had a population of 5,385 with 1,137 houses. There were 2,609 males and 2,776 females at the time of census.
