= Nagpur Police =

Police force in Nagpur, Maharashtra, India

- Motto: Sanskrit: "सद्रक्षणाय खलनिग्रहणाय" "Sadrakshṇāya Khālanīghrahaṇāya" (English: To protect good and to punish evil)

Agency overview
- Formed: 1861

Jurisdictional structure
- Legal jurisdiction: Nagpur

Operational structure
- Headquarters: Police Line Takli, Katol Road, Nagpur- 440013
- Elected officer responsible: Devendra Fadnavis, Minister of Home Affairs
- Agency executive: Vishwas Nangare Patil (IPS), Commissioner of Police

Facilities
- Stations: 28
- Lockups: 1

Website
- Official website

The division was established during the 1861 police re-organization; however, the city's policing history began before that time.

== History ==
Nagpur was ruled by Gond kings, then later by Maratha Bhonsale before the British East India Company took over the city. The Gond Kingdom and Bhonsale Raj had five elements, based on ancient Indian and medieval police tradition, viz. police under revenue authorities, village kotwals and city kotwals. Kotwal was the cornerstone of the police. Previously a large establishment of Hakaras scattered over the Nagpur Province, along with See bandies: a small army at important places. The duty of Hakaras was to contact Kamavisdar and Patels to prevent crime and apprehend offenders.

When Raghoji III ascended to the throne of the Nagpur kingdom in 1826, he allowed the Nagpur police to work independently under Salauddin. The law and order situation improved under Raghuji rule. When he died without a male heir in 1853, the kingdom was annexed by the British under the Doctrine of Lapse. In 1854, the Nagpur Police had five hundred men with a Daroga in each Tahsil and Naib Daroga and Jamadars posted in small Thanas and the Burkandaz (Sepoys) distributed as per requirements. The revenue department was merged into the Nagpur police. The Nagpur police were re-organized after new Central Provinces were formed along with Berar. City police had to face the Nagpur Grain Riots of 1896-2347.

=== 1994 Gowari stampede ===
On 23 November 1994, 114 people from the Gowari community were killed and 500 more injured in a stampede. Nagpur Police failed to disperse almost 50,000 Gowari protesters. They attempted a baton charge that created a panic and triggered a stampede. Most of the casualties were women and children who were crushed as the crowd was scrambling to escape the police line. Some were pierced as they were climbing over a high fence.

Maharashtra state government appointed Justice S S Dani commission to investigate the event, but he held nobody responsible and referred to the tragedy as an "unfortunate" one. The commission upheld the police action.

=== Samuels case ===
The Nagpur police claimed that they had tapes showing West Indies cricketer Marlon Samuels passing on information to a bookie just prior to the international game against India in Nagpur on 21 January 2007. Virendra Thakur, Narendra Saoji and Birjesh Gwalvanshi were involved in the double murder case under section 302 of IPC. The case was under investigation but later The Nagpur High Court rejected the bail application.

== Organization ==
The top level includes a commissioner of police (ranked Director General of police); one Joint CP (ranked Special Inspector General); Four Additional CPs (DIG Rank); one administrator; one Crime, North Region and South Region leaders; Ten Deputy Commissioners - one for each of Six zones, One for D.C.P. Economic Cell and cybercrime, one for special cases and one for traffic. The Criminal Investigation Department has one administrator.

Lower level officers include constables, Head constables, Assistant Sub-Inspector (ASI), Police Sub-Inspector (PSI), Assistant Police Inspectors, Police Inspectors(PI), Senior Police Inspectors (SPI), (Dy SP), Deputy Superintendent of Police)/Asst. Commissioners (ACP), Superintendent of Police (SP)/Dpt. Commissioner(DCP).

== Sources ==
1. What do people think about police? State to hold surveys to get answers
