= Sanatan Sanstha =

Indian spiritual group

- Formation: 24 March 1999; 27 years ago
- Founder: Paratpar Guru (Dr.) Jayant Athavale
- Type: Nonprofit, NGO, Charitable trust
- Purpose: Spreading spirituality, Humanitarian
- Headquarters: Ramnathi, Goa, India
- Services: Spiritual discourses, Environmental protection, Humanitarian aid, Medical aid
- Methods: Hindu awareness
- Affiliations: Hindu Janajagruti Samiti
- Website: sanatan.org

The Sanatan Sanstha is a Hindu organization seeking Hindu nationalism in India. It is a non-government charitable trust founded in 1999 by hypnotherapist Jayant Balaji Athavale. It is headquartered in Ramathi, Goa.

The Sanstha is engaged in a host of activities such as spreading spirituality by conducting various discourses for the spiritually curious, publishing holy texts, creating awareness on issues concerning Nation and Dharma, activities related to relief and rehabilitation, environment protection etc.

Persons owing allegiance to Sanatan Sanstha have been arrested in four bombings in Vashi, Thane, Panvel (all in 2007) and Goa (in 2009) and in the murders of Narendra Dabholkar (in 2013), Govind Pansare and M. M. Kalburgi (both in 2015). This has led to calls for Sanatan Sanstha to be banned. However, such claims have been ruled out by Maharashtra state's Home Minister, Karnataka CID, Goa chief minister and Central Home Ministry. In 2015, Minister of state for home for Government of India informed in Rajya Sabha that, no links could be found among the murders of Narendra Dabholkar, Govind Pansare and M. M. Kalburgi and there was no proposal to ban Sanatan Sanstha.

Dabholkar's family claims the link between the three murders and requesting court to club the cases. However, Central Bureau of Investigation have informed the Bombay High Court that it is waiting for the ballistic report from Scotland Yard to link all three cases.

== Founding ==
Dr. Athavale was a consultant psychiatrist and a clinical hypnotherapist. He graduated from Grant Medical College, Mumbai, following which he initially practiced in Mumbai and then in the United Kingdom for two decades. During the course of his psychiatric practice, Dr. Athavale claimed that around 30% of his patients did not recover completely despite receiving the best medical treatment, but they instead recovered after adopting spiritual remedies or performing certain vedic rituals. He further studied the what he considered to be science of spirituality and this quest led him to his spiritual guide, Bhaktaraj Maharaj. From the year 1995, he dedicated himself towards the cause of spreading spirituality. Under the guidance of his Guru, he founded the Sanstha in March 1999 with the aim to make people understand spirituality in a simple, scientific and pragmatic manner.

== Ideology ==
It is a right wing organisation. The Sanstha is registered as a charitable trust. It was established in 1999 by Dr. Jayant Balaji Athavale to propagate spirituality. Dr. Athavale conceptualised the path of Gurukrupayoga, which is an amalgamation of Karma yoga, Jnana yoga and Bhakti yoga. This path of spiritual practice is advocated by the Sanstha for rapid spiritual progress. This path of spiritual practice comprises two components, viz. vyashti and samashti Sādhanā. Vyashti sadhana brings about individual spiritual upliftment, whereas, samashti sadhana aims at the welfare of the society and nation. The underlying principle of Gurukrupayoga is attaining Guru's grace. Guru's grace can be attained by incorporating chanting, attending satsangs, performing satseva, sacrificing, loving others without any expectations and by removing personality defects and ego aspects in daily routine.

Further, the Sanstha assesses the spiritual level of an individual on a scale of 1 to 100 percent to describe the spiritual maturity of the person. The higher one's spiritual level, the greater is the amount of God principle manifested in that person. According to the Sanstha, the spiritual level a person having negligible interest in spirituality is around 20 percent. Spiritual level of those performing regular spiritual practice (those engaged in ritualistic worship, reading Holy verses or keeping fasts) is in the range of 25 to 30 percent. Post 60 percent, one steadily progresses towards sainthood and Saints have a spiritual level of more than 70 percent. Moksha is attained at the spiritual level of 100 percent. In essence, when one performs Sadhana (spiritual practice) under the guidance of a Guru, his spiritual level increases and subsequently he gets liberated from the cycle of birth and death.

== Activities ==
Sanatan Sanstha started organising various online spiritual discourses aired via Facebook and YouTube live during the initial phase of COVID-19 lockdown in India.

They promote holy texts in various exhibitions and literary events.

They publish books in various languages about spiritual and religious subjects. Sanatan Prabhat, a periodical, is published in Marathi, Hindi, English and Kannada.

Sanatan Sanstha celebrates Guru Purnima festival in places across India every year. Vyaspujan & Gurupujan is performed followed by discourses on spiritual practice and the protection of nation & Dharma.

Every year during the festival of Holi, volunteers of Sanatan Sanstha form a human chain to guard the Khadakwasla dam from revellers, thereby preventing them from bathing and polluting the water.

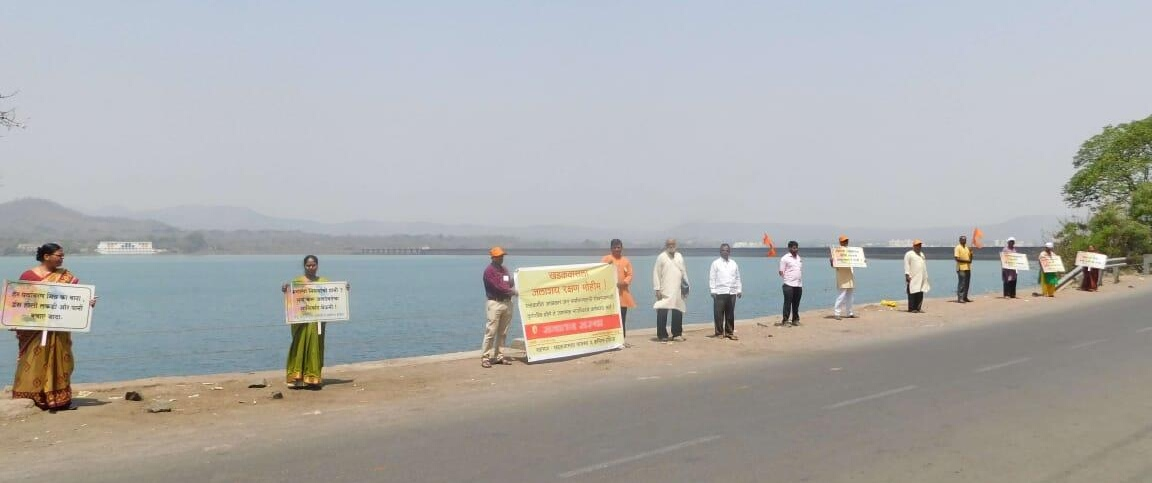
Volunteers of Sanatan Sanstha participating in the Khadakwasla reservoir protection drive during Holi festival in March 2019.

== Alleged criminal activities ==
=== Panvel, Thane and Vashi bomb blast ===
==== Allegations ====
In 2008, six persons owing allegiance to Sanatan Sanstha were arrested for planting bombs in auditoriums at Thane and Vashi and in a movie theater at Panvel. In 2011, two of the accused were found guilty and sentenced to ten years incarceration. Ramesh Gadkari and Vikram Bhave were acquitted of the terror charges under the stringent UAPA, however, the state government's appeal against the removal of UAPA is still pending in the High Court. The Maharashtra government has sought to ban the organization, and has pressed the case for a ban to the central government as well. A central government investigation of the group was ongoing. On 2 December 2015, the Minister of Home Affairs stated in the upper house (Rajya Sabha) that there was no proposal to ban Sanatan Sanstha.

The organization's public image was sullied by allegations of involvement in unlawful activities. Hence it started a series of public meetings in different cities in Maharashtra to dispel what it called "misunderstandings".

==== Convictions ====
On 30 August 2011, Ramesh Gadkari and Vikram Bhave were convicted in sessions court of the Thane blasts and sentenced to ten years rigorous imprisonment. Judgment of trial court was further challenged in the Bombay (Mumbai) High Court and on 2 May 2013 that court ordered the release of the accused on bail while awaiting hearing.

=== Goa blast ===
Six members of the Sanstha arrested in the Goa blast case under UAPA were acquitted by the special National Investigation Agency (NIA) court for want of evidence, while UAPA remains in force against three Sanstha members who are absconding. Two men were declared absconders by the NIA, with a red corner notice issued against one man. Acquittal of six members of Sanatn Sanstha by NIA special court was also confirmed by Bombay High Court (HC) bench in Goa. While passing the order HC observed that, "Merely because the accused persons may have links with Sanatan Sanstha and Sanatan Sanstha was opposed to holding of Narkasur effigy competitions, is by no means sufficient to establish the accused persons had conspired to make explosion at such competition on the fateful night of 16 October 2009."

=== Govind Pansare murder ===
A member of the Sanatan Sanstha was arrested for the murder of Govind Pansare. The trial is yet to commence, but the suspect is already released on bail by the Kolhapur Sessions Court in 2017 due to contradictions in the witness’ statements and the forensic report.

The Special Investigation Team investigating the murder, arrested Sanstha member Sameer Gaikwad and was on the lookout for another member Rudra Patil, who is absconding since the 2009 Goa blast. The prosecution stated in court that Sameer Gaikwad was in different city (Thane) around the time of the murder of Govind Pansare. Minister of Home Affairs Ranjit Patil claimed that the arrest of Sameer Gaikwad was based only on suspicion, and that the only proof is a cellphone conversation about killing Pansare. Eventually, it was revealed that the evidence against Gaikwad is strong, as he was present at the scene of the crime, and he had discussed the murder with other Sanatan Sanstha members. Sanatan Sanstha was also planning to create a 15,000-strong armed force.

=== Narendra Dabholkar murder ===
Indian investigative agencies believe that the Sanatan Sanstha is implicated in the murder of Narendra Dabholkar.

In June 2016, a member of Hindu Janjagruti Samiti (HJS), an offshoot of Sanatan Sanstha, was arrested in connection with the murder. An official of the CBI revealed that emails exchanged between him and his underground colleague, from 2008 to 2013, discuss procurement of weapons and establishment of a weapon-manufacturing unit. The bail applications of the accused were rejected in 2020. However, the judgement by lower court was reversed by the Bombay High Court on 23 March 2021 and the accused was granted bail on 6 May 2021. In September 2021 the court ordered the framing of charges against five members of Sanatan Sansta, including terrorism charges under the UAPA.

=== Gauri Lankesh murder ===
Sanatan Sanstha members were suspected of involvement in the murder of Gauri Lankesh in 2017. Forensic analysis has shown that the same pistol was used to kill Kalburgi, and is also possibly the same gun that was used to kill Narendra Dabholkar and Govind Pansare. Sanstha was implicated in all these murders. However, a representative for Sanatan Sanstha denied involvement in the murder. The article also says that the Karnataka police are investigating if the Gauri Lankesh murder has any connection to three previous murders attributed to the Sanstha.

=== Hypnosis ===
Public interest litigations were filed in the Bombay High Court seeking a ban on the organisation, stating that it uses Ericksonian hypnosis to lure people into joining it and to carry out acts of violence. Such claims are rejected by Hamid Dabholkar, son of slain rationalist Narendra Dabholkar, saying that hypnotism could not provoke a person to cause violence and instead pointing at radicalization as the means of influence.

=== Explosives haul ===
In August 2018, Maharashtra Anti Terror Squad (ATS) had recovered 20 crude bombs, two gelatin sticks, 4 electronic and 22 non-electronic detonators, 150 grams of explosive powder, two bottles labelled 'poison', batteries, soldering equipment, and a bomb circuit drawing from the house of Sanathan Sanstha worker in Nallasopara Explosives and firearms were seized from Nallasopara, Pune and Solapur, and three other men were also arrested.

=== Radicalisation ===
An Anti-Terrorism Squad (ATS) officer said after members of the right-wing outfit were arrested in connection Dabholkar's murder "Members of Sanatan Sanstha are 'hard nuts to crack', who communicate in code languages and have networks in at least four prominent cities of Maharashtra. They also have an 84-page rule book that asks them to 'chant Lord's name' before shooting a target". "They don't speak unless confronted with evidence. They are indoctrinated, tutored, and given elaborate directions. It is not easy to extract information from them," an officer involved in the probe told CNN-News18 on condition of anonymity.

== Drug haul ==
In September 2016, the Maharashtra police's Special Investigation Team (SIT), which is probing the February 2015 murder of communist leader Govind Pansare, seized 20 boxes of restricted drugs — including sleeping pills and suppressants — from the premises Sanatan Sanstha's ashram in Panvel. An SIT official stated that "It is suspected that the drugs were being used to control the mind of followers at the ashram".

== Social media controversy ==
Sanatan Sanstha's activity on social media has come under scrutiny. Facebook's security team has tagged it along with right wing organisations Bajrang Dal and Sri Ram Sena, as a potentially dangerous organisation that supports violence against minorities across India. In September 2020, Facebook banned three of Sanatan's pages. In response to this, Sanatan Sanstha had filed a petition against Facebook in the Bombay High Court. The petition stated that Facebook had violated the fundamental right of freedom of expression guaranteed by the Constitution of India and only on directions of the government or a court, could Facebook have blocked the pages. Sanatan's writ petition was dismissed by the Goa bench of the Bombay High Court on the ground that it was a contractual dispute which was not maintainable under writ jurisdiction. Regardless the organisation has been allowed to spread on Facebook due to political and safety considerations. Facebook has avoided acting against these organisation as it has ties with the ruling Bharatiya Janata Party (BJP) and because "cracking down on Bajrang Dal might endanger both the company's business prospects and its staff in India", The Wall Street Journal newspaper wrote, reaffirming its reportage earlier this year on the subject.

== Environmental destruction and land grab ==
Sanatan Sanstha was served a notice by a local government body in 2021 over illegal hill cutting. Locals protested over the cutting of forests and hills in Goa by Sanatan Sanstha to create residential plots and settle people from outside the state.

== Proposed ban on the organization ==
=== Supporters of the ban ===
BJP

- In September 2015, Goa BJP MLA, Vishnu Wagh demanded that Sanatan Sanstha be banned, stating that there was evidence of the involvement of Sanatan Sanstha in the Pansare and Karburgi murders, and comparing Sanatan Sanstha to SIMI. However, next day Chief Minister of Goa, Laxmikant Parsekar ruled out banning Sanatan Sanstha.
- Maharashtra Chief Minister Devendra Fadnavis has stated that he would not hesitate to ban Sanatan Sanstha if any evidence found against the organisation.

AAP

- Aam Aadmi Party have demanded a ban on the Sanatan Sanstha for the alleged murders they have been involved in.

NCP

- In Maharashtra, NCP, together with the Congress demanded that Sanatan Sanstha be banned. Nawab Malik of the NCP said that Sanatan Sanstha is a terrorist organisation.

Congress

- Former Maharashtra Chief Minister Prithviraj Chavan termed Sanatan Sanstha a dangerous organisation, and demanded that it be banned, and it's kingpin booked and punished. He referred to Sanatan Sanstha as 'terrorist elements that pose a threat to the country'.
- Congress, which is a part of the Maharashtra government, in 2019 demanded a ban on Sanatan Sanstha.

CPI and CPI(M)

- The CPI and the CPI(M) have called for the Sanatan Sanstha to be banned, pointing out that the murders of Pansare, Dabholkar, Kalburgi and Gauri Lankesh are interconnected and followed the same method.

Government of Maharashtra

- In April 2011, Prithviraj Chavan government send formal request to Central government for banning Sanatan Sanstha. However, due to lack of supporting evidences, Central government did not ban Sanatan Sanstha.
- The BJP-Shiv Sena government in 2017 said that a proposal had been sent to the central government seeking a ban on Sanatan Sanstha.
- In August 2018, the Government of Maharashtra said that it would send a fresh request to the Central Government to ban Sanatan Sanstha.

Samajwadi Party

The Samajwadi Party demanded that Sanatan Sanstha be banned and asked the government to heighten security.

Others

- The Sambhaji Brigade has called for Sanatan Sanstha to be banned for conspiracy and murder.
- This demand of the people for a ban also reflected online and on social media, with a petition on Change.org and a page on Facebook.
- The daughter of Govind Pansare also called for the organisation to be banned.
- The government has been severely criticised for failing to ban Sanatan Sanstha; notably, the similarities with banned organisation Students Islamic Movement of India have been pointed out.
- Residents of Goa have been agitating for a ban on the organisation since 2009.

=== Against the ban ===
BJP

- On 24 December 2021, Mangal Prabhat Lodha, a BJP MLA, while expressing his stance in the Maharashtra assembly on the proposed ban on Sanatan Sanstha, asked the Government to notice the hypocrisy of those who demand such kind of prohibition. He asked why those people were silent on banning the Raza Academy. He further requested the MLAs to consider the results of a simple Google search for both of these organisations. The search result for Sanatan Sanstha shows a picture of Arti, while for Raza Academy, it shows an image of the member kicking the martyr's pillar.
- On 2 December 2015, Minister of state for home Kiren Rijiju informed that there is no current proposal for imposing a ban on Sanatan Sanstha. Dabholkar's family is claiming the link between the three murders and requesting court to club the cases. However, CBI have informed High Court that it is waiting for the ballistic report from Scotland Yard to link all three cases.
- On 22 September 2015, Former Home Secretary RK Singh told that Home Ministry under the previous UPA government concluded that there was no specific evidence against Sanatan Sanstha, so on that basis they couldn't ban the organization
- On 24 September 2015, while speaking to journalists at the secretariat in Porvorim, the then Chief Minister of Goa Laxmikant Parsekar ruled out the possibility of banning Sanatan Sanstha. He further said that if someone associated with the Sanstha is an accused in the case, it does not reflect on the Sanstha.

Congress

- In 2011, P. Chidambaram, the Home minister then, had turned down the demand to ban Sanatan Sanstha under section 35(3)(c) of UAPA citing lack of supporting evidences.

MGP

- In October 2018, in the context of ban on the Sanstha, Former PWD Minister of Goa Sudin Dhavalikar lauded Sanatan Sanstha in an interview saying, "Sanatan (Sanstha) is doing the great work of spreading Hindu culture and religion in Goa. They don't believe in violence."
- In September 2015, Goa minister Deepak Dhavalikar came out in support of Sanatan Sanstha saying that he had been closely monitoring the activities of the Sanstha but never found it to preach violence. He further added, "Sanatan Sanstha works for spirituality and the propagation of Hindu religion."

Shiv Sena

- In September 2015, Shiv Sena refuted the demand to ban Sanatan Sanstha by claiming that such allegations are the efforts to defame organisations who are engaged in spreading Hinduism.

Others

- On 7 February 2017, while clarifying its stance on the petition seeking a ban on Sanatan Sanstha, the Union Government told the Bombay High Court that the evidence against Sanatan Sanstha was inconclusive. Hence, it did not declare the Sanstha as a terror outfit.
