= Yargal =

Coordinates: 16°14′N 76°09′E

Yargal is a village situated at Bijapur district in Karnataka (India). It has population of around 5000. It hosts a Jevanta samadhi of Shri SiddhaShankaranand yogi from Nath Sampraday.
