= Bageshwar Dham Balaji Temple =

Hindu temple in Chhatarpur, India

- बागेश्वर धाम बालाजी मन्दिर
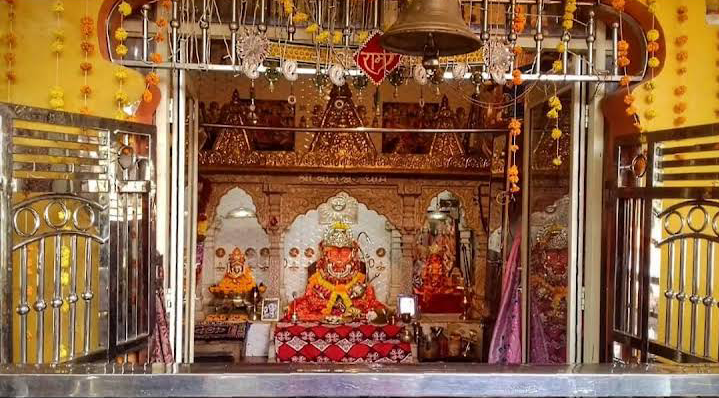
- Bageshawar Balaji Dham

- Location within Madhya Pradesh

Religion
- Affiliation: Hinduism
- District: Chhatarpur
- Deity: Lord Hanuman
- Festival: Hanuman Jayanti

Location
- Location: Gadha, Chhatarpur
- State: Madhya Pradesh
- Country: India
- Interactive map of Bageshwar Dham Balaji Temple
- Coordinates: 24.93055°N 79.59583°E

Architecture
- Type: Hindu temple architecture

Bageshwar Dham Balaji Temple is a Hindu temple dedicated to Hanuman, situated in Chhatarpur district of Madhya Pradesh, India. The current leader of Bageshwar Dham Balaji Temple is Dhirendra Krishna Shastri.

== Location ==
It is situated in village Gadha at a distance of 25 km from Chhatarpur' on Khajuraho Panna Road in Chhatarpur district, Madhya Pradesh.

== See also ==
- Dhirendra Krishna Shastri
- Khole Ke Hanuman Ji Temple
