= Narendra Dabholkar =

Indian physician and author (1945–2013)

- Born: 1 November 1945; Satara, Bombay Province, British India
- Died: 20 August 2013 (aged 67); Pune, Maharashtra, India
- Cause of death: Gunshot wound
- Occupations: Social activist; founder-president of Maharashtra Andhashraddha Nirmoolan Samiti (MANS)
- Spouse: Shaila Dabholkar
- Children: 2
- Honours: Padma Shri (posthumous, 2014)
- Website: antisuperstition.org

Narendra Achyut Dabholkar (1 November 1945 – 20 August 2013) was an Indian physician, social activist, rationalist, and author from Maharashtra, India. In 1989, he founded and became president of the Maharashtra Andhashraddha Nirmoolan Samiti (MANS, Committee for Eradication of Superstition in Maharashtra). Triggered by his assassination in 2013, the pending Anti-Superstition and Black Magic Ordinance was promulgated in the state of Maharashtra, four days later. In 2014, he was posthumously awarded the Padma Shri for social work.

== Personal life ==
Dabholkar was born on 1 November 1945 as the youngest of ten children in the Brahmin household of Achyut and Tarabai. His elder siblings included the educationalist, and socialist Devdatta Dabholkar and Shripad Dabholkar. He is the uncle of Atish Dabholkar.

Narendra did his schooling at New English School Satara and Willingdon College, Sangli. He was a qualified medical doctor, having obtained an MBBS degree from the Government Medical College, Miraj.

He was the captain of the Shivaji University Kabaddi team. He had represented India against Bangladesh in a Kabaddi tournament. He won the Maharashtra government's Shiv Chhatrapati Yuva Award for Kabaddi.

He was married to Shaila, and has two children, Hamid and Mukta Dabholkar. His son was named after the social reformer Hamid Dalwai. He also criticised extravagant marriage ceremonies and arranged for his own children to be married in simple ceremonies. The almanac was not consulted to select an auspicious time as it is traditionally done. He was an atheist.

== Activism ==
After working as a doctor for 12 years, Dabholkar became a social worker in the 1980s. He became involved with movements for social justice, such as Baba Adhav's Ek Gaon Ek Panotha (One village – One well) initiative.

Gradually, Dabholkar started focusing on eradication of superstition, and joined the Akhil Bharatiya Andhashraddha Nirmoolan Samiti (ABANS). In 1989, he founded the Maharashtra Andhashraddha Nirmoolan Samiti (M.A.N.S, transl. "Committee for Eradication of Superstition in Maharashtra"), and campaigned against superstitions, confronting dubious tantriks and claimed holy men who promised 'miracle cures' for ailments. He criticised the country's "godmen", self-styled Hindu ascetics who claim to perform miracles and have many followers. He was the founding member of Parivartan, a social action centre located in Satara district, that seeks to "empower marginalised members of the community to lead lives of security, dignity, and prosperity". He was closely associated with the Indian rationalist Sanal Edamaruku. He was the editor of a renowned Marathi weekly Sadhana, which was founded by Sane Guruji. He also served earlier as a vice-president of the Federation of Indian Rationalist Associations.

Between 1990–2010, Dabholkar was active in a movements for the equality of Dalits (untouchables) and against India's caste system and caste-related violence. He advocated renaming the Marathwada University after Babasaheb Ambedkar, who was the chairman of India's constitution drafting committee and fought for the equality of Dalits. Dabholkar wrote books on superstitions and their eradication, and had addressed over 3,000 public meetings. He had taken on Asaram Bapu in March 2013 over an incident during Holi in Nagpur, when Bapu and his followers used drinking water from tankers brought from the Nagpur Municipal Corporation to celebrate the festival. They were accused of wasting it while the rest of Maharashtra faced a drought.

== Anti-superstition and black magic bill ==
In 2010, Dabholkar made several failed attempts to get an anti-superstition law enacted in the state of Maharashtra. Under his supervision, MANS drafted the Anti-Jaadu Tona Bill (Anti-Superstition and Black Magic Ordinance). It was opposed by some political parties and the Warkari sect. Political parties like the Bharatiya Janata Party and the Shiv Sena opposed it claiming it would adversely affect Hindu culture, customs and traditions. Critics accused him of being anti-religion but in an interview with the Agence France-Presse news agency he said, "In the whole of the bill, there's not a single word about God or religion. Nothing like that. The Indian constitution allows freedom of worship and nobody can take that away, this is about fraudulent and exploitative practices."

A couple of weeks before his death on 6 August 2013, Dabholkar had complained in a press conference that the bill had not been discussed despite being tabled in seven sessions of the state assembly. He had criticised the Chief Minister of Maharashtra, Prithviraj Chavan, stating that the minister had disappointed the progressive people in the state. A day after Dabholkar's murder, the Maharashtra Cabinet cleared the Anti-Superstition and Black Magic Act, however the parliament would still need to support the bill for it to become law. After 29 amendments, it was finally enacted as an act on 18 December 2013.

== Assassination ==
Dabholkar had faced several threats and assaults since 1983 but had declined police protection.

If I have to take police protection in my own country from my own people, then there is something wrong with me, I'm fighting within the framework of the Indian constitution and it is not against anyone, but for everyone.

— Dabholkar on rejecting police protection

On 20 August 2013, while out on a morning walk, Dabholkar was shot by two gunmen near Omkareshwar temple, Pune at 7:20 AM IST. The assailants fired four rounds at him from a point blank range and fled on a motorcycle parked nearby. Two bullets hit Dabholkar in the head and chest and he died on the spot. Subsequent investigations have established that his murder was planned by a Hindu group, the Sanatan Sanstha. This group is also implicated in the murders of Pansare and Kalburgi.

Dabholkar had originally donated his body to a medical college. But, the autopsy made necessary by his murder left the slain leader's body unfit for academic purposes. He was cremated in Satara without any religious rites. His pyre was lit by his daughter, Mukta, in contradiction to the tradition where the son lights the pyre. His ashes were collected without any religious ceremony and scattered over his organic farm.

=== Reactions ===
Dabholkar's assassination was condemned by many political leaders and social activists. The Maharashtra chief minister Prithviraj Chavan announced a reward of ₹1 million (US$10,000) to any person with information of the assailants. Furthermore, political parties called for a bandh (strike) in Pune on 21 August, and various institutions across Pune remained closed to protest Dabholkar's assassination.

=== Investigation ===
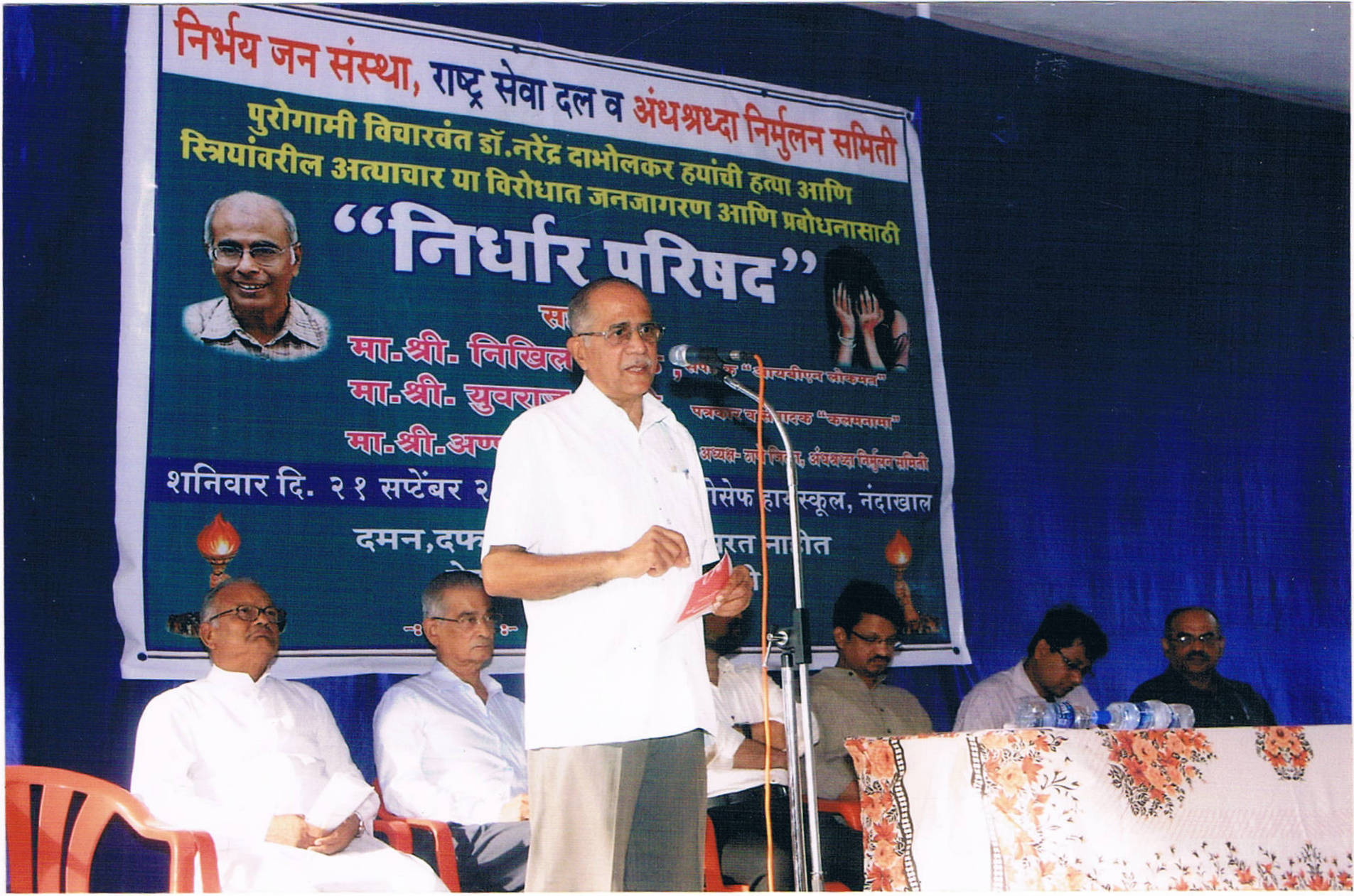
An awareness campaign to highlight Narendra Dabholkar's death

On 20 August 2013, the police stated that it is under suspicion that it was a planned murder because the assailants were aware Dabholkar stays in Pune only on Mondays and Tuesdays. Chavan stated on 26 August 2013 that the police have some clues about his murder. On 2 September, the police stated that 7 surveillance cameras had captured footage of the two assassins, and the footage had been sent to a London-based forensic lab for analysis.

A Public Interest Litigation (PIL) was filed by activist Ketan Tirodkar, urging the case to be investigated by the National Investigation Agency (NIA) instead of the state police, due to a lack of faith with the latter. The Bombay High Court sought responses from the NIA on 24 September. On 15 October, NIA said the case was well within the Indian Penal Code, adding that it was only the assumptions of the petitioner that right-wing activists were involved and it was a scheduled plan.

The Additional Sessions Judge S.R. Navandar (Special Judge for UAPA cases) was presented with a list of documents by the prosecution after charges had been framed in the 2013 murder case.

On 17 January 2014, during his visit to Pune, Home Minister R. R. Patil gave Pune Police a week to make some progress or hand over the case to the Central Bureau of Investigation (CBI). On 20 January, Pune police arrested two suspects based on ballistic reports. The suspects had been previously accused of firearms dealing. Later on 4 March 2014, the Bombay High Court heard a modified PIL from Tirodkar, which sought to involve the CBI in the investigation. The court directed the Pune police to submit copies of case diaries. On 9 May 2014, the Bombay High Court transferred the case to the CBI.

In August 2015, the CBI and Maharashtra government announced a ₹1 million (US$10,000) reward for any person providing information regarding Narendra Dabholkar's assailants.

On 18 August 2018, the CBI arrested Sachin Prakasrao Andure, suspected of being one of the gunmen. Dabholkar's son Hamid Dabholkar believed this to be an important development in the case which will help identify the planner behind the assassination.

In 2019, the CBI found that Sanatan Sanstha's counsel, Sanjeev Punalekar, helped destroy the weapons used in the murders of Dabholkar and journalist Gauri Lankesh. Kalaskar visited Punalekar's office. Further, the CBI called the murders of Dabholkar, Pansare, Kalburgi and Gauri Lankesh a "pre-planned act of terror".

In 2023, his daughter, Mukta, lamented the fact that 10 years had passed but the masterminds behind Dabholkar's murder have not been arrested. Punalekar and his aide, Bhave, were out on bail. On 11 May 2024, special court on convicted and sentenced to life imprisonment the two men accused of shooting him dead in the city on 20 August 2013, while it acquitted the other three accused, including the man the CBI described as the "mastermind", citing lack of evidence.

The court found (accused no. 2) Sachin Prakashrao Andure (33) and (accused no. 3) Sharad Bhausaheb Kalaskar (28) guilty of shooting Dabholkar (69) to death around 7.20am on the Vitthal Ramji Shinde bridge near Omkareshwar temple in the Deccan Gymkhana police area while he was on a morning walk. Apart from life sentence, the judge convicted the duo for common intention under the Indian Penal Code and under Section 3 (25) of the Arms Act, and imposed Rs5 lakh fine each on them.

== Controversy ==
Munnabhai Rasool Ansari and Mangesh Chaudhari confessed being as killers to Goa Police but when they were brought to Mumbai they changed their statement.

== Legacy ==
In the aftermath of the assassination, the Anti-Superstition and Black Magic Ordinance, which Dabholkar helped draft, was enacted by the government of Maharashtra in 2013. Since its passage, the law has been used to indict the perpetrators of a series of egregious lurid frauds, often combined with sexual assault. Unfortunately, the perpetrators have often eluded their victims and the police and escaped to other provinces in which no similar protection against charlatans yet exists.

The Anti-Superstition and Black Magic Ordinance applies only in the state of Maharashtra. In the rest of India the people lack comparable protection from fraudulent pretend-healers and other miracle fakers. Dalbholkar's daughter, Mukta, and other activists have picked up and carry forward his campaign for a nationwide anti-superstition law.

The All India Peoples Science Network (AIPSN) observes 20 August as National Scientific Temper day to commemorate Dr Narendra Dabholkar.

== Books ==
Narendra Dabholkar has authored many books in Marathi which have been translated to Hindi and English.

- Ladhe Andhashraddheche
- Prashna Tumcha Uttar Dabholkaranche
- Timiratuni Tejakade
- The Case for Reason: Volume One: Understanding the Anti-superstition Movement
- The Case for Reason: Volume Two: A Scientific Enquiry into Belief
- Please Think

== In popular culture ==
The assassination is featured along with assassinations of other rationalists such as Govind Pansare, M. M. Kalburgi and journalist Gauri Lankesh in the documentary mini-series Vivek-Reason by Anand Patwardhan.

Short film The Bookshelf was produced in the memory of Narendra Dabholkar, Govind Pansare and M. M. Kalburgi by three Indian publishing houses Tulika Books, Perumal Murugan's publisher Kalachuvadu and Deshabhimani Book House.

== See also ==
- Superstition in India
- Anti-Superstition and Black Magic Ordinance
- Govind Pansare
- M. M. Kalburgi
- Maharashtra Andhashraddha Nirmoolan Samiti (MANS; or Committee for Eradication of Blind Faith, CEBF), founded by Narendra Dabholkar
- Sebastian Martin
