= Hindu Janajagruti Samiti =

Hindutva organisation

- Formation: 7 October 2002; 23 years ago
- Purpose: Creating a Hindu Rashtra
- Headquarters: Goa, India
- Region served: India
- Affiliations: Sanatan Sanstha
- Volunteers: 1000+
- Website: www.hindujagruti.org

Hindu Janajagruti Samiti (HJS) is a right-wing Hindutva organisation operating globally and established on 7 October 2002 by a group of Hindus from various backgrounds. The organisation claims that it "stands as a common platform for all Hindus to unite breaking all the barriers", and its website carries the slogan "For establishment of the Hindu Nation".

== History ==
The HJS, whose name has been translated as Committee for the Hindu Renaissance, has been described as a right-wing group and has protested numerous issues, including in 2011 both the screening of a film about the artist M. F. Husain and the Prevention of Communal and Targeted Violence (Access to Justice and Reparations) Bill. In 2010, the Deccan Herald described the HJS as an "obscure ... small band of fanatics" when reporting the HJS protest against the exhibition of depictions of Hindu deities by José Pereira that were to be displayed at the Xavier Centre of Historical Research in Goa, The HJS had considered three of the paintings to be "derogatory" nude artworks and demanded their removal. It subsequently demanded that the entire exhibition be cancelled without giving any reason. Other protests in 2011-2012 focused on matters such as advertising that the HJS considers to be vulgar, the promotion of LGBT tourism in Goa, and decisions made in Russia that were perceived to be anti-Hindu.

In June 2012, the HJS arranged a five-day All-India Hindu Convention at Ponda, Goa. This attracted attendance from a range of individuals and activists representing various groups and, according to its chief organiser, was intended to "... chalk out a blue print for the protection of dharma and establishment of a Hindu Nation".

In August 2012, following civil disturbances in Mumbai, the group demanded a ban on what it called "fanatical" Muslim groups such as Raza Academy.

A convention organized by HJS in 2014 was supported by prominent activists such as Paras Rajput of Hindu Helpline, Sanjiv Punalekar, the national secretary of Hindu Vidhidnya Parishad, and Rabindra Ghosh, lawyer and president of the Bangladesh Minority Watch.

HJS members have been suspected in the murder of Gauri Lankesh.

In April 2022, HJS coordinator Chandru Moger urged people to boycott Muslim fruit vendors and buy fruits only from Hindu fruit vendors.
