= Bhaskar Save =

Indian agronomist (1922–2015)

Bhaskar Hiraji Save (27 January 1922 – 24 October 2015), was an Indian farmer, educator and environmental activist known for his work in organic farming and sustainable agriculture. Often referred to as the "Guru of Sustainable Agriculture," he advocated traditional farming methods.

== Early life and education ==
Bhaskar Save was born in the coastal village of Dehri, India, on the Arabian Sea into a family belonging to the Wadval community of farm tenders. His early years were spent in Dehri, at that time a small town in Valsad district in the state of Gujarat. His formal education was till class 7th in school of the old system (equivalent to the class 10th of today's school), followed by two years of work towards the Primary Training Certificate. This qualified him to teach in a secondary school in a neighboring village, which he did for ten years. On 2 February 1951, Bhaskar married Malatibai.

== Work ==
=== Early farming ===
Like most other local farmers, Bhaskar's family used to grow mainly rice, pulses, and some vegetables. People often worked together on each other's fields when extra hands were needed to transplant or harvest a paddy field.Often, he accompanied his father on bullock cart trips through forests to neighboring areas. After encountering the Warli tribe, he was fascinated by their way of life and culture, and particularly awed by their belief that God lived in green trees. Among the Warli, trees were never cut down till they dried and shed all trace of green from their body. It was an idea that struck a chord and was to be applied in his own farming career, since the planting of tree crops was not a part of his family's traditional agricultural practices.

As soon as he married, Bhaskar's family began digging their well. By 1952, the well was completed and a waterwheel was constructed. After harvesting their monsoon rice, the family grew irrigated winter vegetables. And for the first time in his life, Bhaskar Save used chemical fertilizer, together with manure – for his vegetable plants. And, in 1953, he used chemicals for his rain-fed rice paddy as well.

The harvest he reaped attracted attention from a director of the Gujarat State Fertilizer Corporation who offered Save an agency contract for marketing their chemical fertilizer. His job included instructing farmers in its use, for which he was promised a commission of Rs 5 on every bag of the chemicals he sold. Soon, Save was recognized as a "model farmer" for his use of the new technology. Several agricultural scientists from Pune and elsewhere drew on his experience for conducting their field trials.

=== Later years ===
By 1954–55, he had already earned enough money to buy one hectare of land suitable for growing rice to begin his own family farm. This was the first of the plots purchased on which today stands the Save family's Kalpavruksha farm, now a 6 hectare orchard, in Umbergaon region, a coastal zone of South Gujarat.

By 1956, he reverted to his father's traditional farming methods. However, inspired by both the writings of Gandhi and Vinoba Bhave, particularly an article by Vinoba on farming practices of certain adivasis, he decided to revert to an organic system on one paddy for experimentation. This called for changing the impounded water several times in one plot (during pauses in the monsoon rains), without using any chemicals. This, too, was successful.

Though his yield declined the first year, so did his expenses and gradually he converted more acreage, which he reserved entirely for organic experimentation. Organic methods of crop rotation, the planting of un-irrigated pulse legumes, like beans, Bengal gram, moong, and so on after harvesting his organic rice were implemented. He found that winter pulses, which supplied an abundance of atmospheric nitrogen in the soil, grew entirely on the sub-soil moisture still present from the recent monsoon. When the pulses were harvested, cattle were allowed to browse the crop residue in the field, thereby recycling their manure to condition the soil as well.

In 1957, Bhaskar Save built a small home on his new, now present, farm, which had grown to two hectares and moved there with his family. Raising an orchard was now his major preoccupation, and he wanted to spend more time working and observing. By 1960, he had eliminated the use of chemicals on his farm.

== Bhaskar's philosophy of natural farming ==
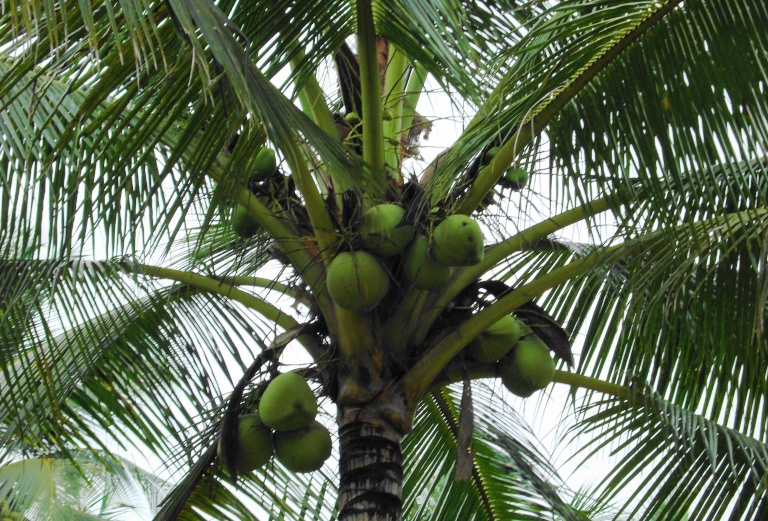
Long-life coconut trees

Bhaskar Save developed his system of natural farming after being induced to use chemical fertilizers, which after three years he realized was not returning value to him or his land. He later commented that: "By ruining the natural fertility of the soil, we actually create artificial 'needs' for more and more external inputs and unnecessary inputs for ourselves, while the results are inferior and more expensive in every way."

The concept and practice of Natural farming was pioneered by Masanobu Fukuoka of Japan, who visited Save at his Kalpavruksh farm in 1997 as a special guest to commemorate India's 50 years of independence led by Mahatma Gandhi. While both men depended on tree crops for the sustainability of their farms, Save organized his own vision of natural farming far more aggressively around the active irrigation of his tree crops, supplemented by grains, vegetables, and livestock. Save is credited with pioneering the platform and trench system to provide water to his tree crops storing moisture in the soil year round. In the beginning, in order to sustain his farm until the long-life fruit trees matured and yielded value, he integrated short, medium and long-life plant species into his early scheme to rapidly establish complete ground cover and optimize yield. Briefly, Save's polyculture plant categories and natural farming philosophy are based on this pattern:

- Short-life span crops, which refer to annual vegetables, grains, herbs, annual flowers.
- Medium-life span edible crops, which include flowers, grains, grasses and fruit trees.
- Long-life span crops, which are perennial vegetables, such as rhubarb, horseradish, asparagus; perennial herbs, some alliums (leeks, chives, garlic), some members of the Brassica family (collards and kale); and bramble fruits (raspberry, blueberry, and blackberry), nut trees (filbert, chestnut, almond, or pecan), fruit trees (kalpavriksha, chikoo, and coconut), and some grasses, like alfalfa.

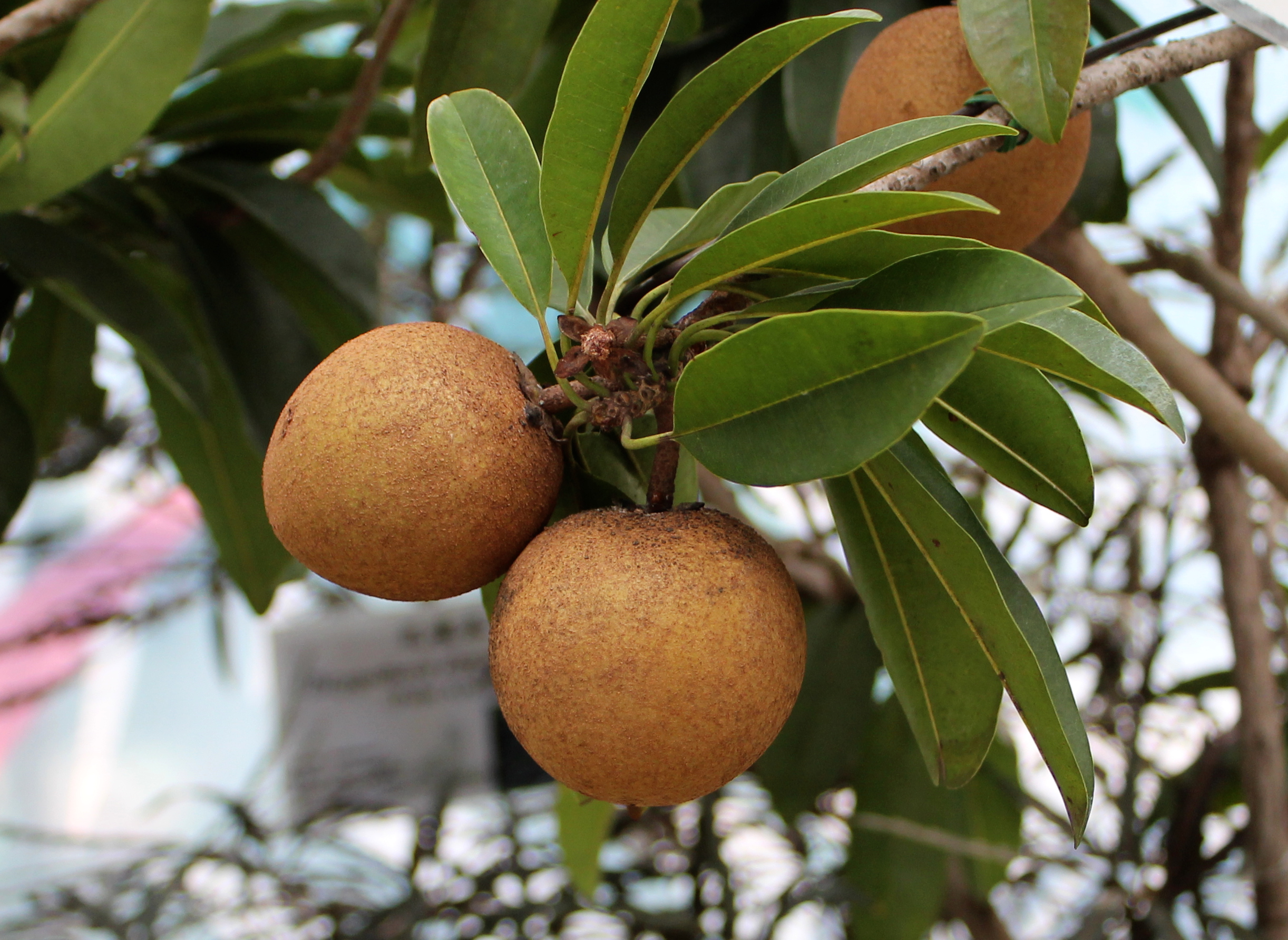
Chikoo or Sapodilla, a long-life evergreen fruit-bearing tree

Save's idea for platforms resulted from a need to grow trees on low-lying paddy fields. To elevate the land, he constructed raised earthen mounds or berms and was then able to plant his saplings. Initially, he simply broaden the berms between his rice plots, depending solely on the monsoon rains for moisture. Later, he was granted permission by the village panchayat to excavate at his own expense a village pond on some uncultivated common land near his farm. The soil that was dug out – as the pond was gradually enlarged and deepened each year – further served to elevate and expand his "platforms" for the trees.

Initially, the saplings of coconut or chikoo (long life-span species) were intercropped only with vegetables (short life-span species). Later, Bhaskar Save integrated other crops like bananas and papayas (medium life-span) among his chikoos and coconuts – to optimize the use of the available sunlight until the long-life trees matured and cast thick shade on the ground. Today, 90% of the family's income is earned from chikoo and coconut production.

In 2006, Bhaskar Save, published an "Open Letter" to the Minister of Agriculture and other top officials to bring attention to the mounting suicide rate and debt among farmers and to encourage them to abandon their policies of importing and promoting the use of toxic chemical fertilizers that were a source of the problem.

== Recognition ==
Beyond the many awards that Bhaskar Save has received, his reworking of an ancient trench and platform system for irrigated fruit trees, such as banana, chikoo and coconut has been recognized by the United Nations (2001) and others as one of the most important orchard production systems in the world. Other achievements include:

- 1993 : Person of the year Award from Limca Book of Records − Mumbai
- 1993 : Received a place in the Limca Book of World Records for generating the highest production and profit in the world with Mr. Save's Organic Farming System.
- 1993 : Nisarg Bhushan award from Shri Mohan Dhariya (M.P.), President of National Foundation of Organic Farming at Sangli – Maharashtra.
- 1994 : New System of Organic Farming award from Gujarat State Sahakari Bank Ltd.
- 1995 : New System of Organic Farming award for Sugarcane production from Dena Bank Ltd. Kolhapur − Maharashtra.
- 1996 : Environment Protection Award from Bhartiy Sahitya Sevak Sangh – Mumbai.
- 1997 : The Second Gandhi of India received title from The world-famous farmer Mr. Masanobu Fukuoka of Japan.
- 1998 : Received "Mr. Fukuoka of India" title from Jatan Sarvodaya Organization of Baroda – Gujarat.
- 1999 : Krushi–Vibhuti award from Rotary Club of Dahanu – Maharashtra.
- 2000 : Jamnalal Bajaj Award presented by the Honorable Shri Krishna Kant - 10th Vice President of India. For Organic Farming Science and Technology and for Rural Development Work.
- 2001 : Gokul Award from Kolhapur Jill Sahakari Milk Protection Sangh − Maharashtra.
- 2002 : Certificate from Krushi & Sahakari Department of Gujarat Government for Low input Organic Farming Technology.
- 2003 : Honored with the Commual Harmony Certificate for Adoption, Propagation and Publicity for the book, Organic Farming System, by Maharashtra Government.
- 2004 : Organic Farming God–Father Award from Maharashtra Government – Krushi Department.
- 2005 : On the 56th year of India's Independence, Governor Shri Nawal Kishore Sharma of Gujarat honored Shri Bhaskar Save for Free Service to the Country.
- 2006 : National Award from Shri Sharad Pawar − Minister of Agriculture, for Best Coconut Farmer.
- 2007 : Organic Farming Scientist award from Gokhale Education Society.
- 2008 : Anubandhi Award from Punyshlok Sadaguru Shiv − Paravati Foundation Pune – Maharashtra.
- 2008 : State Krushi Award from Krushi Vighnan Centre – Ahmednagar.
- 2008 : Certificate for Organic Farming Development from The Gujarat Association for Agricultural Sciences.
- 2009 : Man of the Earth Award from Janirs International Residential & Junior College – Thane (Mumbai)
- 2009 : Gram Shilpi Award from Shri Shankaracharya at Vishwa Mangal Gou Gram Yatra − Gujarat.
- 2010 : Receiving ONE WORLD Lifetime Achievement Award from International Federation of Organic Agriculture Movements (IFOAM) – Germany

== See also ==
- Shripad Dabholkar
- Subhash Palekar
- Natural Farming
- Masanobu Fukuoka
