= Dabholkar =

Dabholkar is a surname. Notable people with the surname include:

- Atish Dabholkar (born 1963), Indian physicist
- Devdatta Dabholkar (1919–2010), Indian educationist and socialist
- Narendra Dabholkar (1945–2013), Indian rationalist and writer
- Shripad Dabholkar (1924–2001), Indian activist
- Vishal Dabholkar (born 1987), Indian cricketer
- Vrishasen Dabholkar, Indian actor
