= Jeevamrutha =

Natural liquid fertilizer

Jeevamrutha (also jeevamrit, jeevamrutham or jivamrita; from Sanskrit jīva "life" and amṛta "nectar") is a fermented liquid organic input used in organic and natural farming in India. It is prepared from fresh indigenous cow dung and urine, jaggery, pulse flour, water and a small amount of soil, and is applied to fields as a soil drench or foliar spray.

Jeevamrutha has been used by Indian farmers for centuries, falling out of use for some time before being revived in the 2000s.

== Etymology and history ==
The name combines the Sanskrit roots jīva ("life") and amṛta ("nectar of immortality"). Fermented manure preparations of this general type are described in pre-modern South Asian agronomic and Ayurvedic literature, including the kunapajala tradition and the related panchagavya formulations.

The modern recipe associated with the name jeevamrutha was developed by Subhash Palekar, an agriculture graduate from Nagpur in Maharashtra. After observing falling yields on his family farm during the mid-1980s, Palekar conducted on-farm experiments between 1989 and 1995 and codified a system that he initially called Zero Budget Natural Farming and later renamed Subhash Palekar Natural Farming. The method spread through training camps in South India, notably in Karnataka in cooperation with the Karnataka Rajya Raitha Sangha and the Amrita Bhoomi Centre affiliated to La Via Campesina. Palekar received the Padma Shri in 2016.

== Сriticism ==
The scientific reception of jeevamrutha as a standalone substitute for mineral fertiliser is mixed. A modelling and synthesis study published in Nature Sustainability concluded that a complete transition from chemical fertilisation to ZBNF, in which jeevamrutha is the principal nutrient input, could reduce yields of major staple crops by up to about 30% unless additional nutrient sources are introduced.

Social-science analyses describe ZBNF as a peasant agroecology movement whose growth has been driven by farmer organisations and state programmes rather than by formal agronomic research, and have documented the rebranding from "Zero Budget Natural Farming" to "Subhash Palekar Natural Farming" and, in central government usage, to the more neutral "Natural Farming".

== See also ==
- Cow urine
- Urease
