= Final Straw: Food, Earth, Happiness =

2015 documentary film about farming

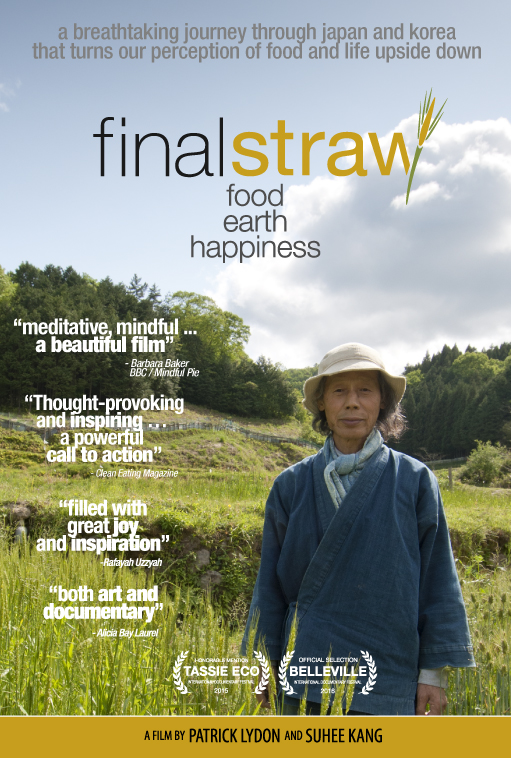
- Directed by: Patrick Lydon; Suhee Kang
- Written by: Patrick Lydon; Suhee Kang
- Produced by: SocieCity Films
- Starring: Yoshikazu Kawaguchi; Larry Korn; Kristyn Leach; Seong Hyun Choi; Ryosok Hong; Kazuaki Okitsu; Dennis Lee
- Cinematography: Patrick Lydon
- Music by: WindSync; Bomnoonbyul; Joyful Island; Ippen
- Distributed by: Gumroad (International); Kaori Tsuji (Japan)
- Release dates: June 1, 2015 (Digital Release); March 5, 2016 (Belleville Doc Fest)
- Running time: 75 minutes (U.S. / International); 64 minutes (Japan / Korea)
- Countries: United States, Japan, South Korea
- Languages: English, Korean, Japanese
- Budget: $30,000 USD

Final Straw: Food, Earth, Happiness is a documentary/art film released in June 2015 that takes audiences through farms and urban landscapes in Japan, South Korea, and the United States, interviewing leading practitioners in the natural farming movement. The film—inspired by the work of Masanobu Fukuoka, and his book The One Straw Revolution—came about when an environmental artist (Patrick M. Lydon) and an environmental book editor (Suhee Kang) had a chance meeting in Seoul, South Korea, and began conducting short interviews together with leaders in the ecology and social justice movements. During an interview with Korean farmer Seong Hyun Choi, the two were so impressed by his ecological mindset and way of working that they set out to produce a feature film about the wider natural farming movement in Japan and Korea. Lydon and Kang ended up quitting their jobs, giving away most of their possessions, and becoming voluntarily homeless for four years in order to afford producing the film.

The film is split into three sections 1) Modern Life, 2) Foundations and Mindset of Natural Farming, and 3) Natural Farming in Practice and Life. According to the filmmakers, as they began to understand more about how natural farming itself was not rooted in methods, but in a way of thinking, they chose to explore the life philosophies and ways of thinking of natural farming practitioners in a more free-flowing and artistic way, rather than an instructive one; the result is an unconventional documentary that features slow paced musical interludes alongside interviews.

== Production ==
Lydon and Kang spent what they call a "meager" life savings to make the film, along with the volunteer efforts of farmers, translators, writers, musicians they had met during their journey. Although the film was filmed, written, and edited entirely by the two directors, they readily admit that the process of making the film was co-operative effort, with more than 200 volunteers directly involved in the process in some way. The soundtrack was recorded with professional musicians from each of the three countries where filming took place, all of whom donated their time to contribute to the film project. With the continued help of international volunteers, the film has been translated into five languages (Chinese, English, Japanese, Korean, Turkish), and three more (Portuguese, French, Vietnamese) are in progress.

== Tour ==
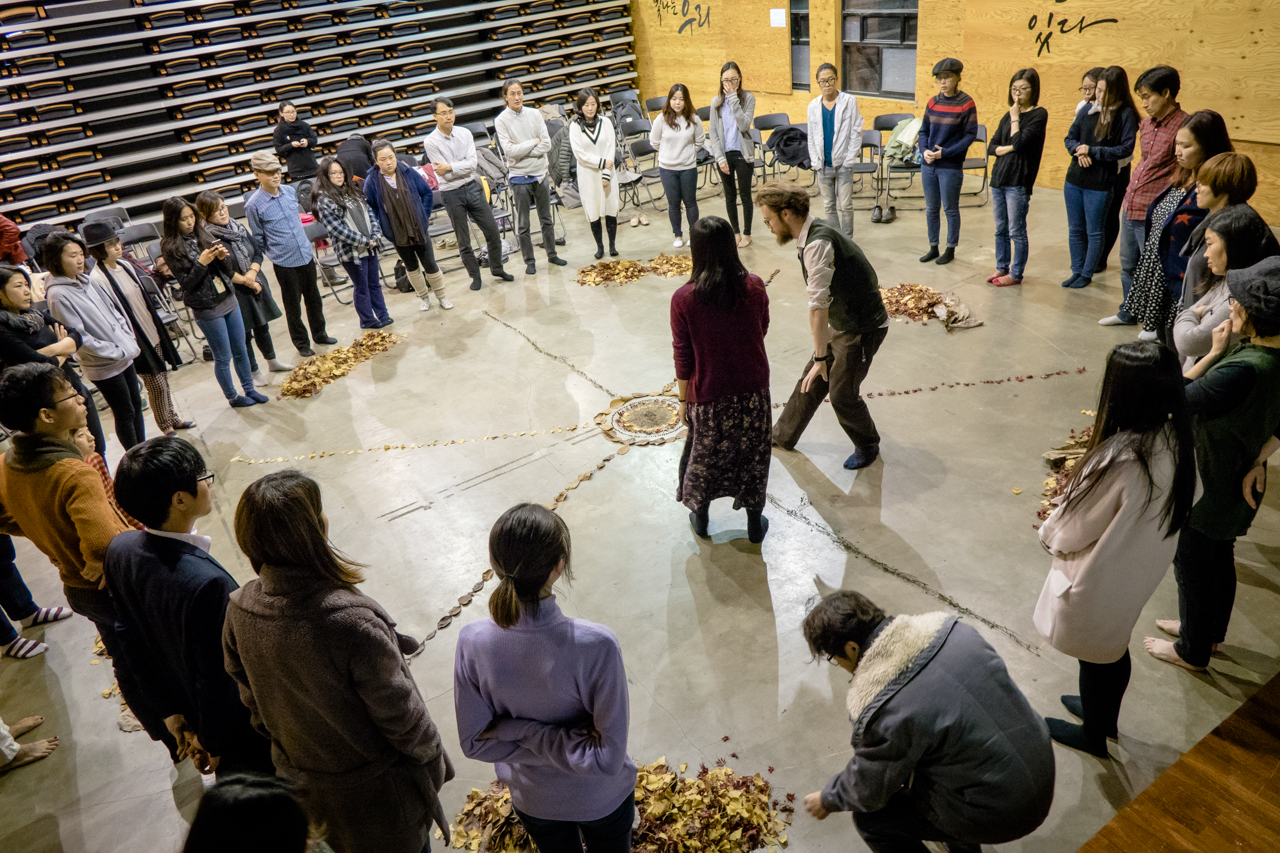
Artists and filmmakers, Patrick Lydon and Suhee Kang host a 'mandala' workshop after a screening of their film in Seoul, South Korea.

Frustrated by the lack of distribution and film festival options for low- and no-budget films, the filmmakers made the decision to manage distribution and touring in the same way they went about filming, through co-operative effort. With the help of volunteers, independent theater owners, and community organizers, they launched an extensive tour throughout Japan and South Korea from 2015–2016, eventually screening the film at over 130 venues.

Rather than simply screening the film, the filmmakers decided to transition their existing media production organization, SocieCity, into a vehicle for art and community engagement. They made a point of hosting interactive events along with their screenings and in several cases, stayed in communities for up to three months at a time to build natural gardens and host a project they call REALtimeFOOD, a grown-to-order restaurant which connects the ideas from the film with real-world practices in farming, food, and crafts. In most cases, these efforts were funded by grants from local philanthropic organizations and/or supported by the communities themselves.

== Critical reception ==
The film received positive reviews, with New York Times bestselling author and musician Alicia Bay Laurel calling it "both art and documentary", and others calling it "meditative, and mindful", and "an inspiring call to action." Video Librarian, a longtime resource of film reviews for educational institutions, gave the film 4.5 stars for its "intriguing, inspiring" and "delicate" touches, while being an excellent "modern overview of one of the major causes of the climate crisis".

Interested in the unconventional way the film was being made and toured, multiple magazines and newspapers in Japan and Korea followed the directors during several parts of their journey, notably ESSEN, Bar and Dining, and Road magazines, and Shikoku Shinbun and Huffington Post newspapers. During the tour, the film was eventually picked up by festivals including Tassie Eco Film Festival and Belleville Doc Fest.

The film was one of 25 chosen for the Global Environmental Justice Collection, an educational film collection supported by the International Documentary Association and curated by professors from Whittier, Yale, and New York University. The collection won the 2020 Buchanan Prize, which goes annually to "an outstanding pedagogical, instructional, or curriculum publication on Asia designed for K-12 and college."
