= Zero Budget Natural Farming =

Zero Budget Natural Farming (ZBNF) also called Subhash Palekar Krushi is a farming system which relies on on-farm biomass to increase productivity of the soil. Practitioners call for non-compost, non-organic inputs to increase fertility by relying on Jeevamrutha and increasing humus content. In India, Subhash Palekar has promoted and written on it extensively.

== India ==
ZBNF has been practised in South Indian states like Karnataka, Maharashtra, Andhra Pradesh. In Andhra Pradesh, the government has promoted it at state level. The government’s Economic Survey of 2018-19 advocated it as a lucrative livelihood option for small farmers.

== Comparative analysis ==
This farming method has empirically been proven to be better than organic farming.
