= Shripad Dabholkar =

Indian social activist and educationalist (1924–2001)

Shripad A. Dabholkar
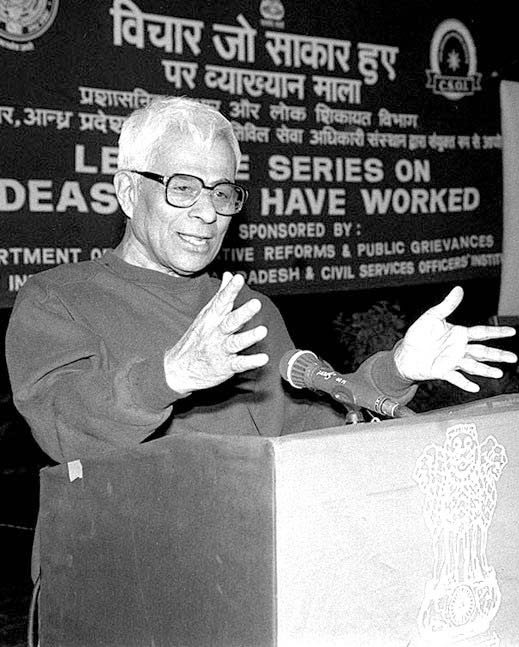
- Shripad Dabholkar at seminar on Ideas that have worked, New Delhi, 2001
- Born: 1924; Maharashtra, India
- Died: May 2001 (aged 76–77); Maharashtra
- Occupations: Intellectual; activist; educationist
- Known for: Founding Prayog Pariwar methodology
- Notable work: Plenty for All (1998)
- Movement: Grassroots networking, scientific farming
- Relatives: Narendra Dabholkar (brother)
- Awards: Jamnalal Bajaj Award (1985)

Shripad A. Dabholkar (1924 – May 2001) was an Indian intellectual and social activist. He was the founder of a non-structured methodology of grassroot networking for nature-friendly neighbourhood development called Prayog Pariwar (Experimenting Communities). His contributions were recognized by many awards including the 1985 Jamnalal Bajaj Award.

Prayog Pariwar received considerable attention from some of the influential educational thinkers including Paolo Freire (author of `Pedagogy of the Oppressed’) and Ivan Illich (author of`Deschooling Society’). Illich invited Dabholkar to Centro Intercultural de Documentación in Cuernavaca in 1970. Kassel University in Germany organized in 1973 ‘‘Science for Rural Development: a workshop with Shripad Dabholkar and Paolo Freire’’. The theme of the workshop was to juxtapose the`Critical pedagogy’ of Freire for raising political awareness (conscientization) and the pedagogical methods of Prayog Pariwar to develop resource literacy.

== Biography ==
Shripad A. Dabholkar was an educationist who aimed to shape education as a tool for total change in the life situation of an average worker in rural areas. Dabholkar worked as a professor of mathematics for 25 years at a rural university Mauni Vidyapeeth which was founded by J. P. Naik as a pilot project with the motto "Development through Education" and with funding from the Central Government.

Dabholkar grew dissatisfied with the formal schooling which often did not connect with the real-life situations, and with the limitations of conventional academic system which tended to exclude many capable individuals with a stamp of failure. He left the university to undertake the task of educating farmers through demystification of science, adopting non-formal methods of knowledge communication.

Dabholkar started his work in Tasgaon, a village in Sangli district in Maharashtra, with a core group of farmers including Mhetre, Arve, Patil. The successes of this group with their innovative approach helped in creating mass awareness and interest in many other small farmers. They formed their own study groups and turned to grape cultivation against the advice of conventional agricultural experts and even though it was not a traditional crop in the region.

Dabholkar translated the classic monograph ‘’General Viticulture’’ by Winkler et al into Marathi for the farmers which was mastered and assimilated by their study groups. This network-building for using advanced science to address real-life situations resulted in a new sociology of science and education.

The productivity in the district rose to world standards and grape production became a highly productive activity, inducing more farmers to turn to it. These farmers in Maharashtra without formal agricultural education became India's leading grape cultivators with a turnover of over $100 million. Dabholkar then successfully extended the applied research to other crops as well.

He is the father of Atish Dabholkar and elder brother of Narendra Dabholkar.

== Prayog Pariwar ==
Prayog Pariwar methodology is about networking of self-experiment ventures for nature friendly prosperity. The central thesis is that without depending on foreign aid or imported technology, economic development can be achieved by experimenting farmers and by common individuals in their own neighborhoods by assimilating latest science. It evolved from the initiatives by Dabholkar in Maharashtra, India, in the mid-1960s. The network was then called Swashraya Vikas Mandal, meaning self-help and self-reliance for building new possibilities by working in one's own real-life situation.

This network of farmers soon began to implement latest scientific methods in their real-life situations, developed their own research methods and grape varieties better suited for local conditions. These groups also pioneered collaborative networking practices and an Internet-type information exchange using postcards.

Dabholkar described the Prayog Pariwar methodology in the book Plenty for all where he defines and establishes a non structured approach for development in the neighborhood through:

- grassroot networking
- demystification of latest science, knowledge and new thoughts to generate and propagate
- people's own techno-scientific ventures

Prayog Pariwar has proven successful even in the absence of Dabholkar. A network involving thousands of small farmers remains active even today, for example, in the area near Nasik. Adherents have shown that quarter of an acre of land and waste water can produce sufficient food to feed a family of five at a "middle-class" level.

This eco-friendly and grassroots approach to farming based on implementing latest science in the context of local neighborhoods is referred to "Natu-eco farming" to distinguish it from "natural farming" championed by Masanobu Fukuoka and Organic farming with which it shares some common traits.

== See also ==
- Bhaskar Save
- Subhash Palekar
- Natural Farming
- Masanobu Fukuoka

== Bibliography ==
- Plenty for All; Prayog Pariwar Methodology, Shripad A. Dabholkar, Mehta Publishing House, 1998, ISBN 8171617492
- General Viticulture, A. J. Winkler, J. Cook, M. Kliewer, L. Lider, L. Cerruti, 1974, University of California Press, ISBN 978-0520025912
- Prosperity with Equity 'Ideas That Have Worked' Seminar, New Delhi, 2001.
