= Yoshikazu Kawaguchi =

Japanese farmer (1939–2023)

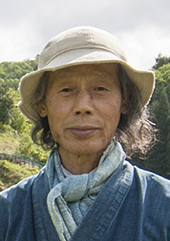
- Kawaguchi in a production still from Final Straw: Food, Earth, Happiness
- Born: 1939; Sakurai, Nara Prefecture, Japan
- Died: 9 June 2023 (aged 83–84)
- Occupations: Farmer, author, teacher
- Known for: Natural Farming methods

Yoshikazu Kawaguchi (川口由一, Kawaguchi Yoshikazu; 1939 – 9 June 2023) was the leading Japanese practitioner of the "natural farming" method popularized by Masanobu Fukuoka and farmed by this method in Sakurai City, Nara Prefecture for 30 years. He was a farmer, author, and founder of the Akame Natural Farming School, or 赤目自然農塾 in Japanese.

== Early life ==
Kawaguchi was born the eldest son of a tenant farmer of many generations; unlike Fukuoka, who was from the landlord class. Kawaguchi aspired to become a painter and attended Tennoji Art Institute, whilst continuing to work at the family's farm. His father died when Kawaguchi was only 11 years old, which meant he was forced to join the family farm.

== Transition to Natural Farming ==
By 1978, after 22 years of conventional farming, Kawaguchi experienced severe liver damage, which he posited was caused by the agricultural chemical fertilizers, herbicides and pesticides used on the farm. The failure of allopathic doctors to cure him led in response to Kawaguchi discovering Fukuoka's seminal book The One Straw Revolution, studying and starting to promote both Natural Farming and Traditional Chinese Medicine.

He was also influenced by Wes Jackson, the founder and former president of The Land Institute; Kawaguchi is said to be the leading representative of the second generation of Natural Farming, using a gentler, more flexible approach to Fukuoka's, in which there are no definitive rules and each application depends on the individual environment.

== Kawaguchi's Natural Farming ==
The natural farming method of Masanobu Fukuoka uses no fertilizers or chemicals and very little water, allowing crops and weeds to grow freely, requiring a minimum of human intervention. Although his work is based on Fukuoka's natural farming principles, Kawaguchi's own methods differ notably from those of Fukuoka. The divergence is expected; as the foundation of natural farming is not in a technique, but in a way of approaching nature with awareness and respect.

Kawaguchi stated the core values of natural farming as:

1. Do not plow the fields
2. Weeds and insects are not your enemies
3. There is no need to add fertilizers
4. Adjust the foods you grow based on your local climate and conditions

With these values in place, he argued, you can grow food in most places in the world without need for imported resources including fertilizers.

His own first attempts were not successful until, he said, he understood that the aim was to cultivate land as in the very early days of cultivation rather than to let it go totally wild.

== Realizing the Limitations of Modern Farming ==
During and after his health issues in the late 1970s, Kawaguchi realized that farming which relied on chemicals and tilling of the soil was not only causing health issues, but was not nearly as efficient as its proponents claimed to be. He saw during his own transition from industrial methods to natural non-chemical methods, that the immense amount of inputs (energy and human effort) required by industrial farming did not translate to higher efficiency, or even higher yields.

Multiple studies have since shown that calories of food per acre can be higher on natural or regenerative organic farms than on typical industrial farms, even though the former do not rely on external, non-renewable inputs. The findings highlight the inherent regenerative potential of local ecosystems, and their use for providing food for humans, while also providing for the health of the broader environment.

== Achievements ==
In 1991, he started Akame Natural Farming School which currently has more than 10 sites and another 5 teaching traditional medicine and around 250 students. It is one of a number of volunteer-run "no tuition" agricultural schools in Japan. Graduates from the school have further opened 44 learning sites throughout Japan, where approximately 900 people study 'Natural Farming'. Kawaguchi was at the heart of the contemporary Natural Farmers network in Japan.

Kawaguchi was the central character in the 2015 documentary film Final Straw: Food, Earth, Happiness, one of 25 films chosen for the Global Environmental Justice Collection used in university courses on sustainability in North America. The collection won the Buchanan Prize in 2020. In 1997, his work was featured in "Natural Farming - The World of Kawaguchi Yosikazu," a documentary at the Yamagata International Documentary Festival and shown at the 2010 International Film Festival on Organic Farming in Tokyo.

In 2008 he spoke at the 17th National Gathering of Natural Farming Practitioners along with Manabu Sakai (member of House of Representatives) and representatives from the Ministry of Agriculture, Forestry and Fisheries, the Ministry of Environment and the Agricultural and Life Sciences Department of University of Tokyo.

== Death ==
Kawaguchi died on 9 June 2023 at his home in Sakurai City, Nara Prefecture. He was 84 years old.

== Bibliography ==
- Kawaguchi, Yoshikazu 川口由一 Taenaru Hatake ni Tachite『妙なる畑に立ちて』 (Standing in the Exquisite Garden). Shizuoka: Yasosha Publishing Co., 1990.
- Kawaguchi, Yoshikazu 川口由一 Shizen-No kara No wo Koete『自然農から 農を超えて』(From Natural Farming, Beyond Farming). Sendai: Katatumuri Publishing Co., 1993.
- Kawaguchi, Yoshikazu 川口由一 and Toriyama, Toshiko. 鳥山敏子 Shizen-No『自然農』(Natural Farming). Tokyo: Banseishobo Publishing Co., 2000.

== Filmography ==
- Final Straw: Food, Earth, Happiness, Patrick M. Lydon and Suhee Kang, SocieCity Films 2016.
- Natural Farming, Toshiko, Toriyama and Koizumi Shukichi, Group Gendai Inc. 1997.
- 「 人類の明日を悟る 」 (Understand the Future of Humanity) － 自然農上映会 シンポジウム 演奏 対談 － 主催・赤目自然農塾 制作・加治幸博

== See also ==
- Organic farming
- Nature Farming
