= Atish Dabholkar =

Indian theoretical physicist

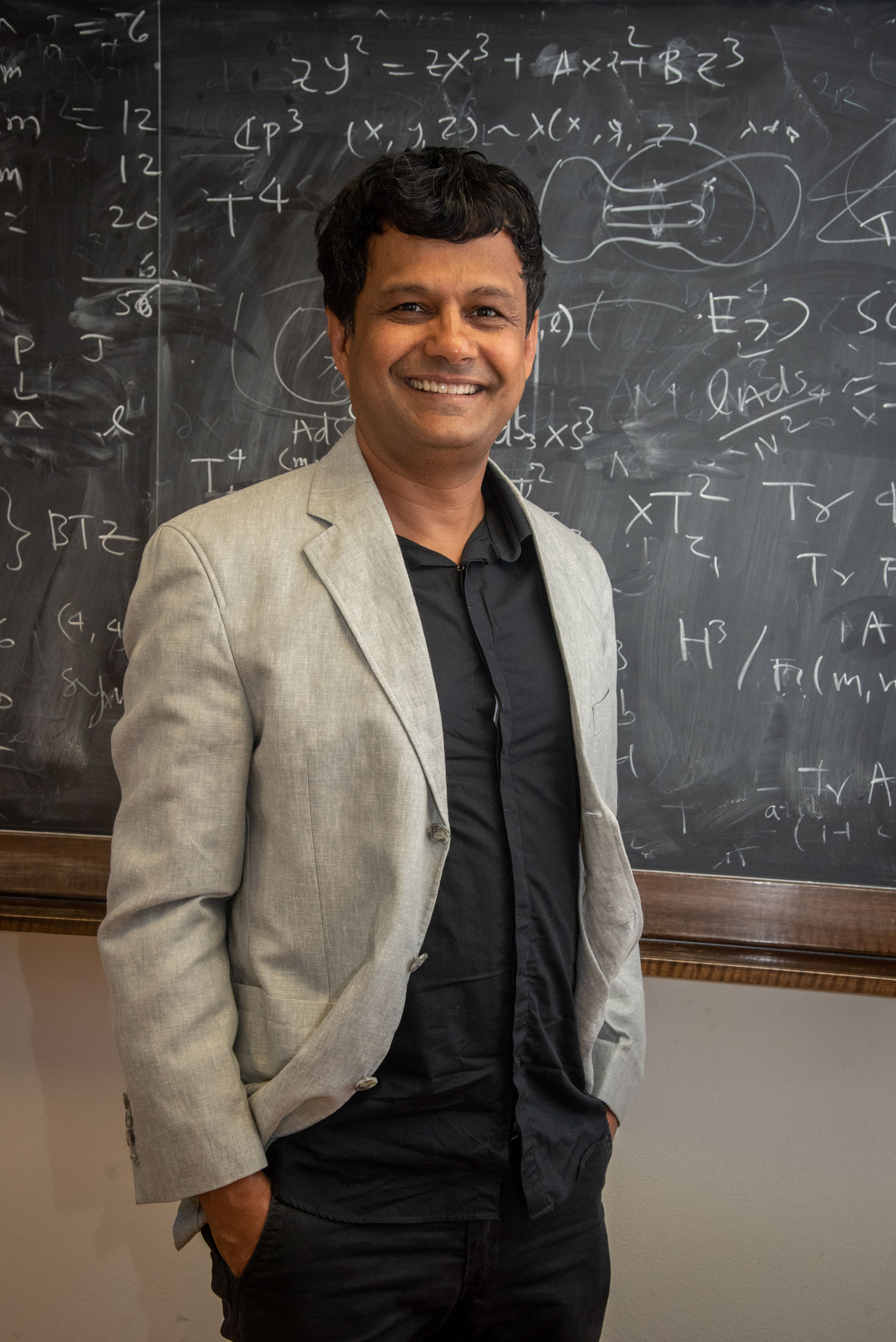
- Born: India
- Education: IIT Kanpur; Princeton University
- Known for: Studies on quantum gravity, black holes and string theory
- Awards: SS Bhatnagar Prize (2006); ANR Chaire d'Excellence (2007); National Leadership Award (2008); Distinguished Alumnus Award (2023)
- Scientific career
- Fields: Theoretical physics
- Workplaces: Rutgers University; Harvard University; California Institute of Technology; TIFR; Stanford University; CNRS; CERN; ICTP
- Doctoral advisor: Jeffrey A. Harvey

Atish Dabholkar (Marathi अतीश दाभोलकर) is an Indian theoretical physicist. He is currently the Director of the Abdus Salam International Centre for Theoretical Physics (ICTP) with the rank of Assistant Director-General, UNESCO. Prior to that, he was head of ICTP's High Energy, Cosmology and Astroparticle Physics section, and also Directeur de Recherche at the Centre National de la Recherche Scientifique (CNRS) at Sorbonne University in the "Laboratoire de Physique Théorique et Hautes Énergies" (LPTHE).

== Biography ==
Atish Dabholkar earned his master's degree in physics from the Indian Institute of Technology, Kanpur in 1985 and his PhD in theoretical physics from Princeton University in 1990 under the guidance of Jeffrey A. Harvey. Subsequently, he worked at Rutgers University and then at Harvard University as a post-doctoral associate. After spending two years at California Institute of Technology as a senior research fellow, he returned to India in 1996 to take up the position of a professor of theoretical physics at Tata Institute of Fundamental Research till 2010. In November 2019, Dabholkar was appointed as Director of the Abdus Salam International Centre for Theoretical Physics (ICTP). Prior to that, he was head of ICTP's High Energy, Cosmology and Astroparticle Physics section International Centre for Theoretical Physics (ICTP) and a Directeur de Recherche of the Centre National de la Recherche Scientifique (CNRS) at Association Sorbonne Université in the Laboratoire de Physique Théorique et Hautes Énergies (LPTHE) since 2007. Dabholkar was a visiting professor at Stanford University during 2003–04 and at CERN during 2012.

== Contributions to Physics ==
In his work in collaboration with Jeffrey A. Harvey, Dabholkar identified a spectrum of supersymmetric states (now known as "Dabholkar-Harvey states'') and initiated the study of supersymmetric solitons in string theory which played an important role in the discovery of duality symmetries in string theory and later in the study of quantum entropy of black holes.

One of his important results concerns the computation of the quantum corrections to the Bekenstein–Hawking entropy of a class of black holes in string theory. The Bhatnagar prize cites Dabholkar's "outstanding contributions for establishing how quantum theory modifies the entropy of black holes and his pioneering studies of supersymmetric solitons in string theory".

Dabholkar collaborated with Sameer Murthy and Don Zagier to discover a connection between the quantum entropy of black holes and the mathematics of mock modular forms introduced by Ramanujan a century ago . In his subsequent work with Pavel Putrov and Edward Witten he showed that mock modularity is generic and essential for exhibiting the duality symmetries of quantum gauge theories and M-theory and is a consequence of non-compactness in field space.

Dabholkar was the co-organizer of the Strings 2001 Conference held at Tata Institute of Fundamental Research in Mumbai, India, for the first time outside of the US and Europe. A partial list of his publications is at the online article repository of the Indian Academy of Sciences.

== ICTP Leadership ==
The year 2024 marked ICTP's 60th anniversary, which was celebrated with a series of global events, including events held at the UNESCO headquarters in Paris in April 2024, at the IAEA in Vienna in November 2024, and at the United Nations headquarters in New York in May 2025.

On these different fora, Dabholkar advocated the new strategic vision for ICTP in the coming decades as the 'Lighthouse for Global Science', emphasizing “the need to think anew the mission of ICTP responding to the changing scientific and geopolitical landscape while remaining true to our foundational inspiration”.The new Strategic Plan 2025 for 'ICTP 2.0' was adopted starting with his second mandate emphasizing three strategic priorities:

- International Science Alliance: Build collaborations with national agencies, foundations and private donors around the globe in “equal partnerships” to expand the reach of the ICTP network.
- International Consortium for Scientific Computing (ICOMP): Incorporate 'Open Computing' as an essential component of 'Open Science' to make advances in computational sciences accessible to the broader scientific community.
- ICTP Core: Reinforce existing scientific competencies of ICTP in the core areas of research and programs, modernize both scientific and physical infrastructure, and build upon these assets to enhance ICTP’s overall impact.

Progress toward these strategic priorities includes several new partnerships. In 2024 ICTP signed agreements with the Ministry of Science, Technology and Innovation of Brazil and South Africa's National Institute for Theoretical and Computational Sciences.

In 2024 ICTP also signed a five-year partnership with IBM, including the creation of a new prize for excellence in AI research, and in 2025 a prize for excellence in quantum computing.

In 2024 the Simons Foundation International made available a major grant to ICTP to create an International Science Complex to cater to the several thousand scientific visitors coming to ICTP each year.

During Dabholkar’s directorship ICTP instituted new prizes and chairs to honor the scientific contributions from the global South exemplifying the core belief of the founding director Abdus Salam that 'scientific thought and its creation is a common and shared heritage of all humankind'. These include the Srinivasa Ramanujan International Chair in Mathematics and the Miguel Virasoro Visiting International Chair in Physics. The ICTP-IBM Brahmagupta AI Prize for Early Career Scientists was established in collaboration with IBM in 2024 to recognize excellence in AI research.

== Awards and honors ==
Well known for his research on string theory, black holes and quantum gravity, Dabholkar is an elected fellow of the Indian Academy of Sciences. The Council of Scientific and Industrial Research, the apex agency of India for scientific research, awarded him the Shanti Swarup Bhatnagar Prize for Science and Technology, the highest Indian science prize awarded by the Prime Minister of India, for his contributions to physical sciences in 2006. Dabholkar was awarded the Chaire d'Excellence of the Agence Nationale de la Recherche in France in 2007. He is also a recipient of the National Leadership award from the President of India in 2008. In 2021, he was elected as a Fellow of The World Academy of Sciences (TWAS) for the advancement of science in developing countries. In 2023, the DAA Evaluation Committee from the Indian Institute of Technology Kanpur (IIT Kanpur), unanimously resolved to confer the Distinguished Alumnus Award (DAA) for his record of achievements.

== Personal life ==
Atish Dabholkar is the son of Shripad Dabholkar and Vrinda Dabholkar and the nephew of Narendra Dabholkar. He is married to Anita Kovačič, has two children, and lives in Slovenia.

== Activism ==
Dabholkar was one of the signatories to the letter by over 700 scientists against the Citizenship Amendment Bill. The letter protested against the use of religion as a legal criterion for determining Indian citizenship as being fundamentally inconsistent with the basic structure of the constitution of India.

Dabholkar participated in the movement of the Maharashtra Andhashraddha Nirmoolan Samiti to get the Anti Superstition Act passed in the Maharashtra Legislature. He co-organized the signature campaign that collected the signatures of 3000 scientists and 100000 citizens in support. The law was successfully enacted in 2013.

== Selected publications ==
- Atish Dabholkar, Jeffrey Harvey (1989). "Nonrenormalization of the Superstring Tension". Physical Review Letters. 63 (5): 478–481. Bibcode:1989PhRvL..63..478D. doi:10.1103/PhysRevLett.63.478. PMID 10041085.
- Atish Dabholkar, Gary Gibbons, Jeffrey Harvey, Fernando Ruiz Ruiz (1990). "Superstrings and Solitons". Nucl. Phys. B. 340 (1): 33–55. Bibcode:1990NuPhB.340...33D. doi:10.1016/0550-3213(90)90157-9.
- Atish Dabholkar (2005). "Exact Counting of Supersymmetric Black Hole Microstates". Physical Review Letters. 94 (24) 241301. arXiv:hep-th/0409148. Bibcode:2005PhRvL..94x1301D. doi:10.1103/PhysRevLett.94.241301. S2CID 7443143.
- Atish Dabholkar, Joao Gomes, Sameer Murthy, Ashoke Sen (2011). "Supersymmetric Index from Black Hole Entropy". JHEP. 1104 (4): 034. arXiv:1009.3226. Bibcode:2011JHEP...04..034D. doi:10.1007/JHEP04(2011)034. S2CID 53383306.
- Atish Dabholkar, Sameer Murthy, Don Zagier (2012). "Quantum Black Holes, Wall Crossing and Mock Modular Forms". arXiv:1208.4074.
- Atish Dabholkar, João Gomes, Sameer Murthy (2015). "Nonperturbative black hole entropy and Kloosterman sums". JHEP. 1503 (3): 074. arXiv:1404.0033. Bibcode:2015JHEP...03..074D. doi:10.1007/JHEP03(2015)074. S2CID 256006269.
- Teresa Bautista, André Benevides, Atish Dabholkar (2017). "Nonlocal Quantum Effective Actions in Weyl-flat Spacetimes". JHEP. 1806 (6): 055. arXiv:1711.00135. doi:10.1007/JHEP06(2018)055. S2CID 73588642.
- Atish Dabholkar, Pavel Putrov, Edward Witten (2020). "Duality and Mock Modularity". SciPost Physics. 9 (5): 072. arXiv:2004.14387. Bibcode:2020ScPP....9...72D. doi:10.21468/SciPostPhys.9.5.072. S2CID 216867432.

== Lecture Notes and Books ==
- Atish Dabholkar, Suresh Nampuri (2012). "Quantum Black Holes". Strings and Fundamental Physics. Lecture Notes in Physics. Vol. 851. pp. 165–232. arXiv:1208.4814. Bibcode:2012LNP...851..165D. doi:10.1007/978-3-642-25947-0_5. ISBN 978-3-642-25946-3. S2CID 53391911.
- Atish Dabholkar (1998). "Lectures on Orientifolds and Duality". High Energy Physics and Cosmology, ICTP Proceedings. 14: 128–191. arXiv:hep-th/9804208. Bibcode:1998hepc.conf..128D.
- Atish Dabholkar (2002). Strings 2001: Proceedings of the Strings 2001 Conference, TIFR, India, January 5-10, 2001. American Mathematical Soc. ISBN 978-0-8218-2981-3.
