= Subhash Palekar =

Indian agriculturist (born 1949)

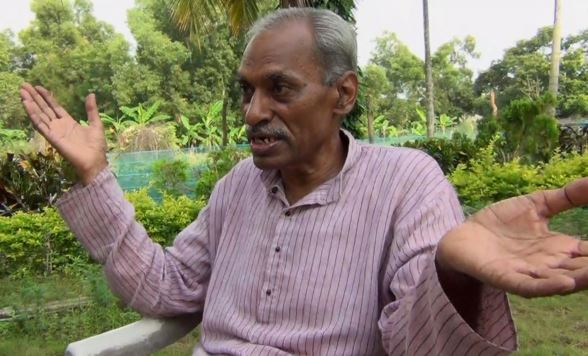
- Subhash Palekar
- Born: 1 July 1949 (age 77); Maharashtra, India
- Occupations: Agricultural scientist, farmer, author
- Known for: Philosophy, Natural farming
- Notable work: 'Holistic Spiritual Farming'

Subhash Palekar (born 1 July 1949) is an Indian agriculturist who practiced and wrote many books about Subhash Palekar Natural Farming (previously called Zero Budget Natural Farming).

Palekar was born in 1949 in a small village Belora in the Vidarbha region of Maharashtra in India, and he has an agricultural background. He practised Zero Budget Natural Farming without using pesticides to cultivate. He has conducted many workshops all over India and was awarded India's fourth highest civilian award the Padma Shri in 2016.

== Education and profession ==
Palekar has a bachelor's degree in agriculture from the Shri Shivaji Agriculture College, Amravati. During college education he was working with tribal people in Satpuda Tribal region. In 1972 he joined the family farm with his father, a natural farmer. Having learned of pesticides and artificial fertilizers at college, Palekar started applying them on his farm. While working from 1972 to 1990, he also wrote many media articles on agriculture, while experimenting with new farming techniques.

He was attracted to the philosophy (Indian ancient thinking) of the Vedas, Upanishads, and all ancient Granthas. His Spiritual background was inspired by Saint Dhnyaneshwar, Saint Tukaram and Saint Kabir. Searching for truth, he studied Gandhi and Karl Marx comparatively. Gandhi's philosophy of non-violence appealed to him more. Prominent Indian personalities like Gandhi, Shivaji, Jyotiba Phule, Vivekananda and Tagore helped reinforce his belief in absolute natural truth and nonviolence (Satya & Ahimsa). From 1972 to 1985, while farming with Green Revolution chemical inputs, his agricultural production increased. But after this date, yields started declining. After searching the causes for three years he concluded agricultural science was inferior to natural farming methods.

== New beginning ==
While at college, he studied tribal peoples' lifestyles and social structure, and forest ecosystems. He realized the forest does not require human assistance for its existence and growth. The forests have fruit-bearing trees such as Mango, Ber, Tamarind, Jamulum and Custard Apple which feed the forest inhabitants. Therefore, he embarked on a research on the natural growth of trees. For twenty years studied forest vegetation, and applying forest principles on his farm from 1989 to 1995 in 154 research projects. These provided the basis for Zero Budget Natural Farming, his unique approach to farming involving manures and agroecology. Study materials have been offered to farmers throughout India by means of continuous workshops, seminars, and books in Marathi, Hindi, English, Kannada, Telugu, and Tamil. Thousands of models farms exist throughout India.

Palekar was in the editorial team of Bali Raja, a renowned Marathi Agricultural Magazine in Pune, Maharashtra until 1998. He has written more than 20 books in Marathi, 4 books in English, and 3 books in Hindi. All the books in Marathi are to be translated in all Indian languages. His movement has attracted the attention of the media, politicians and thinkers. More than 30 million farmers throughout India are practicing Zero Budget Natural Farming, in parts of Maharashtra, Karnataka, Telangana, Andhra Pradesh, Tamil Nadu, Kerala, Punjab, Haryana, Uttar Pradesh, Madhya Pradesh, Chhattisgarh, Jharkhand, Rajasthan, Gujarat and West Bengal.

On 14 June 2017, Sri. Subhash Palekar was appointed as advisor to the state of Andhra Pradesh on Zero Budget Farming with the aim of encouraging natural farming. The advisor role is equivalent to cabinet rank. Himachal Pradesh state government and Karnataka state government is also keen on using Palekar's techniques. Palekar has given presentation to Prime Minister Narendra Modi on zero budget natural farming.

== Awards ==
Palekar received fourth highest civilian award Padma shri in 2016 from Government of India thus becoming first active Indian farmer to do so.

== See also ==
- Natural Farming
- Shripad Dabholkar
- Bhaskar Save
