= Vishwa Mangal Gou Gram Yatra =

Vishwa Mangal Gou Gram Yatra (Devanagari:विश्व मंगल गौ-ग्राम यात्रा) is the largest ever cow protection movement in India. The yatra (journey) began on 30 September 2009 from Kurukshetra in Haryana and ended on 17 January 2010 at Nagpur, covering 20,000 kilometres (12,000 mi) in these 108 days.

== Cow slaughtering ==
- 1760 : Robert Clive established in Calcutta the first abattoir of the country.
- 1861 : Queen Victoria wrote to Viceroy of India prompting to hurt the Indian sentiments towards cows.
- 1947 : At the time of independence, India had a little more than 300 abattoirs. Today there are more than 35,000 approved ones. There are thousands of unapproved slaughter houses.
- The cow-breeds have fallen from 70 to 33. Even among the remaining breeds, some are at the verge of extinction.
- Cow population has reduced by 80% after independence.
- 1993-94 : India exported 1,01,668 ton beef, with a target of 2,00,000 tons for 1994-95.
- We slaughter cow for its hide to make vanity bags and belts, bone-meal for tooth paste, blood for vitamin tablets and intestines (especially of calves) for making gold and silver wafers to stick on sweets.
- 17th Indian Livestock Census reports that the number of cattle in India is continuously decreasing, with 430 per 1000 humans in 1951 to 110 per 1000 humans in 2001. The estimated figure in 2011 is 20 cattle per 1000 humans. One can imagine what will be the situation of milk and milk-products if this becomes a reality.
