= Masanobu Fukuoka =

Japanese farmer and philosopher (1913–2008)

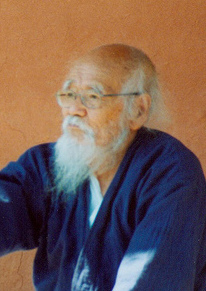
- Masanobu Fukuoka in 2002
- Born: 2 February 1913; Iyo, Japan
- Died: 16 August 2008 (aged 95); Iyo, Japan
- Occupations: Agricultural scientist, farmer, author
- Known for: Philosophy, natural farming
- Notable work: The One-Straw Revolution
- Awards: Ramon Magsaysay Award, Desikottam Award, Earth Council Award

Masanobu Fukuoka (Japanese: 福岡 正信, Hepburn: Fukuoka Masanobu; 2 February 1913 – 16 August 2008) was a Japanese farmer and philosopher celebrated for his natural farming and re-vegetation of desertified lands. He was a proponent of no-till, herbicide and pesticide-free cultivation methods from which he created a particular method of agriculture, commonly referred to as "natural farming" or "do-nothing farming".

Fukuoka was the author of several books, scientific papers and other publications, and was featured in television documentaries and interviews from the 1970s onwards. His influences went beyond farming to inspire individuals within the natural food and lifestyle movements. He was an outspoken advocate of the value of observing nature's principles.

== Life ==
Fukuoka was born on 2 February 1913 in Iyo, Ehime, Japan, the second son of Kameichi Fukuoka, an educated and wealthy land owner and local leader. He attended Gifu Prefecture Agricultural College and trained as a microbiologist and agricultural scientist, beginning a career as a research scientist specialising in plant pathology. He worked at the Plant Inspection Division of the Yokohama Customs Bureau in 1934 as an agricultural customs inspector. In 1937 he was hospitalised with pneumonia, and while recovering, he stated that he had a profound spiritual experience that transformed his world view and led him to doubt the practices of modern "Western" agricultural science. He immediately resigned from his post as a research scientist, returning to his family's farm on the island of Shikoku in southern Japan.

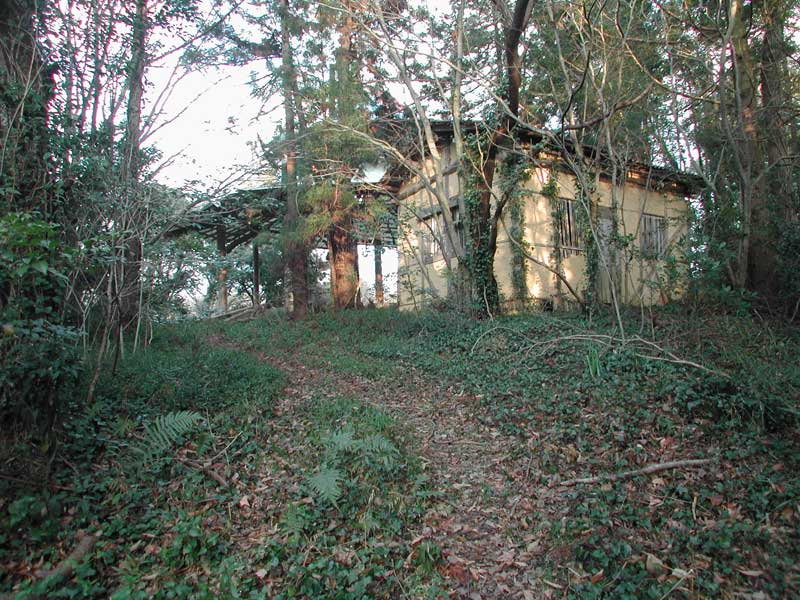
Fukuoka's hill in Iyo, Ehime

From 1938, Fukuoka began to practice and experiment with new techniques on organic citrus orchards and used the observations gained to develop the idea of "Natural Farming". Among other practices, he abandoned pruning an area of citrus trees, which caused the trees to become affected by insects and the branches to become entangled. He stated that the experience taught him the difference between nature and non-intervention. His efforts were interrupted by World War II, during which he worked at the Kōchi Prefecture agricultural experiment station on subjects including farming research and food production.

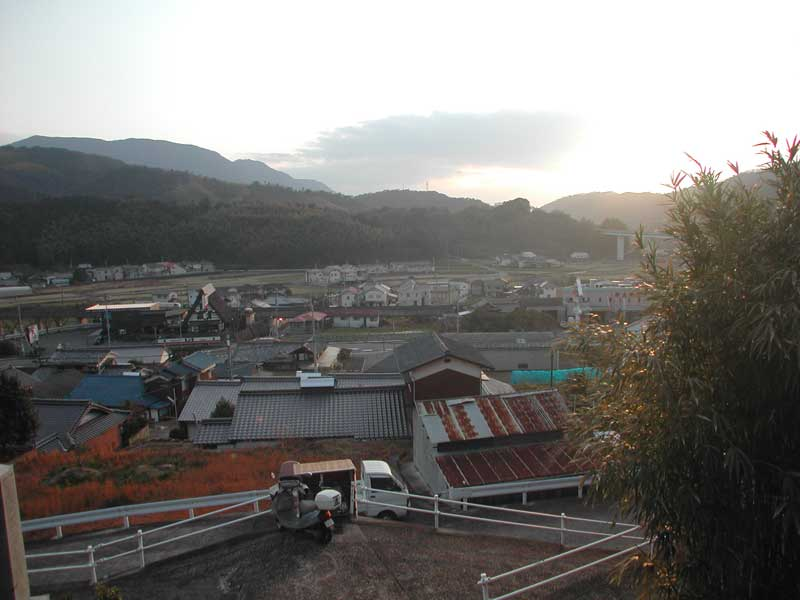
View of Fukuoka's family farm (center right) and hill in Iyo, Ehime

In 1940, Fukuoka married his wife Ayako, and they had five children together. After World War II, his father lost most of the family lands in postwar land reform and was left with three-eighths of an acre of rice land and the hillside citrus orchards his son had taken over before the war. Despite these circumstances, in 1947 he took up natural farming again with success, using no-till farming methods to raise rice and barley. He wrote his first book, Mu 1: The God Revolution, or Mu 1: Kami no Kakumei (無〈1〉神の革命) in Japanese, during the same year, and worked to spread word of the benefits of his methods and philosophy. His later book, The One-Straw Revolution, was published in 1975 and translated into English in 1978.

From 1979, Fukuoka travelled the world extensively, giving lectures, working directly to plant seeds and re-vegetate areas, and receiving a number of awards in various countries in recognition of his work and achievements. By the 1980s, Fukuoka recorded that he and his family shipped some 6,000 crates of citrus to Tokyo each year, totalling about 90 tonnes.

During his first journey overseas, Fukuoka was accompanied by his wife Ayako, met macrobiotic diet leaders Michio Kushi and Herman Aihara, and was guided by his leading supporter and translation editor Larry Korn. They sowed seeds in desertified land and met with United Nations UNCCD representatives including Maurice Strong, who encouraged Fukuoka's practical involvement in the "Plan of Action to Combat Desertification".

In 1983, he travelled to Europe for 50 days holding workshops, educating farmers and sowing seeds. In 1985, he spent 40 days in Somalia and Ethiopia, sowing seeds to re-vegetate desert areas, including working in remote villages and a refugee camp. The following year he returned to the United States, speaking at three international conferences on natural farming in Washington state, San Francisco and at the Agriculture Department of the University of California, Santa Cruz. Fukuoka also took the opportunity to visit farms, forests and cities giving lectures and meeting people. In 1988, he lectured at the Indian Science Congress, state agricultural universities and other venues.

Fukuoka went to Thailand in 1990 and 1991, visiting farms and collecting seeds for re-vegetating deserts in India, which he returned to during November and December that year in an attempt to re-vegetate them. The next year saw him participate in official meetings in Japan associated with the Earth Summit in Rio, Brazil, and in 1996 he returned to Africa, sowing seeds in desert areas of Tanzania, observing baobab trees and jungle country. He taught the making and sowing of clay seed balls in Vietnam during 1995.

He travelled to the Philippines in 1998, carrying out Natural Farming research, and visited Greece later that year to assist plans to re-vegetate 10,000 hectares (40 sq. mi.) around the Lake Vegoritida area in the Pella regional unit and to produce a film of the major seed ball effort. The next year he returned to Europe, visiting Mallorca.

He visited China in 2001, and in 2002 he returned again to India to speak at the "Nature as Teacher" workshop at Navdanya Farm and at Bija Vidyapeeth Earth University in Dehradun, Uttarakhand in northern India. On Gandhi's Day, he gave the third annual Albert Howard Memorial Lecture to attendees from all six continents. That autumn he was to visit Afghanistan with Yuko Honma but was unable to attend, shipping eight tons of seed in his stead. In 2005, he gave a brief lecture at the World Expo in Aichi Prefecture, Japan, and in May 2006 he appeared in an hour-long interview on Japanese television network NHK.

Masanobu Fukuoka died on 16 August 2008 at the age of 95, after a period of declining mobility that made him reliant on a wheelchair.

== Natural farming ==
Fukuoka called his agricultural philosophy shizen nōhō (自然農法), most commonly translated into English as "natural farming". It is also referred to as "the Fukuoka Method", "the natural way of farming" or "Do-Nothing Farming".

The system is based on the recognition of the complexity of living organisms that shape an ecosystem and deliberately exploiting it. Fukuoka saw farming not just as a means of producing food but as an aesthetic and spiritual approach to life, the ultimate goal of which was "the cultivation and perfection of human beings".

The four principles of natural farming are that:

- human cultivation of soil, plowing or tilling are unnecessary, as is the use of powered machines
- prepared fertilizers are unnecessary, as is the process of preparing compost
- weeding, either by cultivation or by herbicides, is unnecessary; instead, only minimal weed suppression with minimal disturbance should be used
- applications of pesticides or herbicides are unnecessary

== Clay seed balls ==
Fukuoka re-invented and advanced the use of clay seed balls. Clay seed balls were originally an ancient practice in which seeds for the next season's crops are mixed together, sometimes with humus or compost for microbial inoculants, and then are rolled within clay to form into small balls. This method is now commonly used in guerilla gardening to rapidly seed restricted or private areas.

== Awards ==
In 1988, Fukuoka received the Visva-Bharati University's Desikottam Award as well as the Ramon Magsaysay Award for Public Service in the Philippines, often considered "Asia's Nobel Prize".

In March 1997, the Earth Summit+5 forum in Rio de Janeiro presented him with the Earth Council Award, received in person at a ceremony in Tokyo on 26 May of that year, honouring him for his contributions to sustainable development.

In 1998, Fukuoka received a grant of US$10,000 from the Rockefeller Brothers Fund, but the grant was returned because his advanced age prevented him from completing the project.

== Influence ==
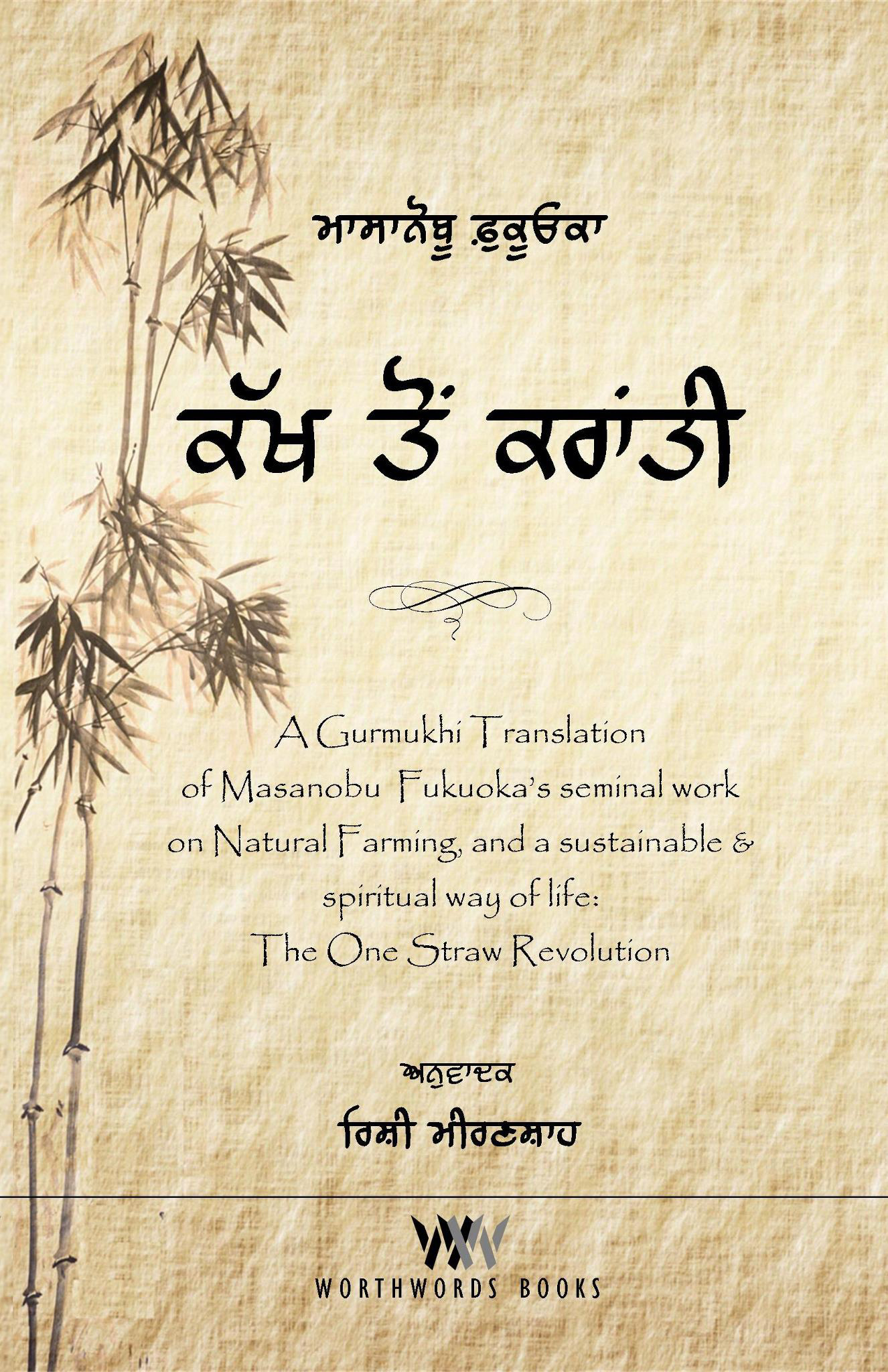
Book cover of Gurmukhi translation of One Straw Revolution by Rishi Miranshah

In the international development of the organic farming movement, Fukuoka is considered to be amongst the "five giant personalities who inspired the movement" along with Austrian Rudolf Steiner, German-Swiss Hans Müller, Lady Eve Balfour in the United Kingdom and J. I. Rodale in the United States.

His books are considered both farming compendiums and guides to a way of life.

The One-Straw Revolution has been translated into over 20 languages and sold more than one million copies and Fukuoka has been widely influential, inspiring an international movement of individuals discovering and applying his principles to varying degrees, such as Akinori Kimura, David Mas Masumoto and Yoshikazu Kawaguchi, and has significantly influenced alternative movements in the West, such as permaculture.

Rosana Tositrakul, a Thai activist and politician, spent a year studying with Fukuoka on his farm. She then organised a visit by Fukuoka to the Kut Chum District of Yasothon Province in northeastern Thailand, which, together with his books, were influential in the rapid and widespread adoption of organic and chemical-free rice farming in the district.

== Reception ==
In the preface to the US editions of The One-Straw Revolution, Wendell Berry wrote that Fukuoka's techniques are not "directly applicable to most American farms", but ultimately concludes that it would be "a mistake to assume that the practical passages of this book are worthless..." suggesting that Natural Farming would require farmers to have fresh eyes and the right kind of concern for their land in order to come up with methods relevant to their own farms.

Fukuoka's techniques have proven difficult to apply, even on most Japanese farms, and have been described as a sophisticated approach despite their simple appearance. In the initial years of transition from conventional farming there are losses in crop yields. Fukuoka estimated these to be 10% while others, such as Yoshikazu Kawaguchi, have found attempting to strictly follow Fukuoka's techniques led to crop failures and require many years of adaption to make the principles work.

In the early 2000s, Theodor Friedrich and Josef Kienzle of the Food and Agriculture Organization (FAO) opined that his rejection of mechanisation is not justifiable for modern agricultural production and that the system cannot interact effectively with conventional agricultural systems.

More recently however, the FAO (along with multiple research universities and organizations such as the Union of Concerned Scientists) have found conventional industrial agriculture systems to be rooted in unsustainable practices that ignore basic biology and the needs of ecosystems. Many of Fukuoka's principles are now being incorporated into modern forms of farming that are more biodiverse, less reliant on chemicals and machines, and which produce similar yields while increasing the health of the soil and surrounding environment. In particular, the concepts of non-tillage, relay cropping, cover-cropping, and plant biodiversity have been shown to prevent soil loss, reduce or eliminate the need for pesticides or fertilizers, and reduce flooding, while increasing water retention, and providing habitat for insects that contribute positively to both crop and ecosystem health.

In Japan, where Fukuoka had few followers or associates, his critics argue that the "inner world and the connection between humans and nature does not, however, exhaust reality" and that he did not give sufficient attention to interpersonal relationships or society. These criticisms were in some ways addressed by the next generation of natural farmers in Japan such as Yoshikazu Kawaguchi, who started a movement of widespread free schools, and yearly conferences to help spread the mindset of natural farming. There are now over 40 learning sites and more than 900 concurrent students in the Japanese natural farming network.

== Selected works ==
=== Articles ===
- 柑橘樹脂病特にその完全時代に就て [(A study) On Citrus gummosis (fungus): specifically in its Perfect State (sexually-reproductive state)]. Annals of the Phytopathological Society of Japan (in Japanese). 7 (1). The Phytopathological Society of Japan: 32–33. August 1937. doi:10.3186/jjphytopath.7.32. ISSN 0031-9473.
- 私の農法(講演〔「近代農法の反省と今後の農業」セミナーより) [My farming ways (A lecture at the "Reflecting on modern-day farming ways and considering the future of farming" seminar)]. Cooperative Research Institute Monthly Report (in Japanese) (214). Cooperative Research Institute: 19–36. July 1971. ISSN 0914-1758.
- 生と死 ―私の死生観― [Life and Death: My View of Life and Death]. 智慧とは何か - 仏教の知 現代の知 [What is Wisdom?: Buddhist way-of-knowing Present-day way-of-knowing]. Quarterly Buddhism (in Japanese). Vol. 7. Hōzōkan. May 1989. pp. 159–. ISBN 978-4-8318-0207-1.
- 砂漠に種を蒔く [Sow seeds in the desert]. いのちの環境 [Life's environment]. Quarterly Buddhism - Supplementary Issue (in Japanese). Vol. 6. Hōzōkan. November 1991. pp. 52–. ISBN 978-4-8318-0256-9.
- 自然教に生きる [Nature/Natural/Spontaneous teaching for living]. 「日本仏教」批判 ["Japanese Buddhism" A Criticism]. Quarterly Buddhism (in Japanese). Vol. 25. Hōzōkan. October 1993. pp. 130–. ISBN 978-4-8318-0225-5.
- 自然農法のよる社会革命 —自然の心に到る道— [Nature Farmings' continuation's social revolution —The Path Leading to Natural Mind]. 森の哲学 - 新たな宗教哲学をめざして [Forest's Philosophy - Toward a new philosophy of religion]. Quarterly Buddhism (in Japanese). Vol. 28. Hōzōkan. July 1994. pp. 176–. ISBN 978-4-8318-0228-6.

=== Bibliography ===
Mu 1: The God Revolution (English translation)

==== In Japanese ====
- 1947 – Mu (無), self-published, incorporated into later editions.
- 1958 – Hyakushō Yawa: 「Fu」Shizen Nōhō (百姓夜話・「付」自然農法), self-published, later incorporated into Mu: Kami no Kakumei (無 神の革命).
- 1969 – Mu 2: Midori no Tetsugaku (無２ 緑の哲学), self-published; republished as Mu 2: Mu no Tetsugaku (無2 無の哲学) by Shunjūsha (春秋社), Tokyo, 1985. ISBN 978-4-393-74112-2
- 1972 – Mu 3: Shizen Nōhō (無３ 自然農法), self-published; republished by Shunjūsha, 1985. ISBN 978-4-393-74113-9
- 1973 – Mu 1: Kami no Kakumei (無1 神の革命), self-published; republished by Shunjūsha, 1985. ISBN 978-4-393-74111-5
- 1974 – Mu: Bessatsu Midori no Tetsugaku – Nōgyō Kakumei Ron (無 別冊 緑の哲学 農業革命論), self-published.
- 1975 – Shizen Nōhō: Wara Ippon no Kakumei (自然農法 わら一本の革命); republished by Shunjūsha, 1983. ISBN 978-4-393-74103-0
- 1975 – Shizen Nōhō: Midori no Tetsugaku no Riron to Jissen (自然農法 緑の哲学の理論と実践), Jiji Press Co. ISBN 978-4-7887-7626-5.13-3
- 1984 – Shizen ni Kaeru (自然に還る), Shunjūsha. ISBN 978-4-393-74104-7
- 1992 – "Kami to Shizen to Hito no Kakumei": Wara Ippon no Kakumei – Sōkatsuhen (「神と自然と人の革命」わら一本の革命・総括編), self-published. ISBN 978-4-938743-01-7.
- 1997 – "Shizen" o Ikiru (「自然」を生きる). Co-authored with Toshio Kanamitsu (金光 寿郎). Shunjūsha, ISBN 978-4-393-74115-3.
- 2001 – Wara Ippon no Kakumei: Sōkatsuhen – Nendo Dango no Tabi (わら一本の革命 総括編 —粘土団子の旅—), self-published; republished by Shunjūsha, 2010. ISBN 978-4-393-74151-1
- 2005 – Shizen Nōhō: Fukuoka Masanobu no Sekai (自然農法 福岡正信の世界), Shunjūsha, ISBN 978-4-393-97019-5

==== In English ====
- 1978 [1975 Sep.] – The One-Straw Revolution: An Introduction to Natural Farming, translators Chris Pearce, Tsune Kurosawa and Larry Korn, Rodale Press.
- 1985 [1975 Dec.] – The Natural Way Of Farming - The Theory and Practice of Green Philosophy, translator Frederic P. Metreaud, published by Japan Publications. ISBN 978-0-87040-613-3
- 1987 [1984 Aug.] – The Road Back to Nature - Regaining the Paradise Lost, translator Frederic P. Metreaud, published by Japan Publications. ISBN 978-0-87040-673-7
- 1996 [1992 Dec.] – The Ultimatum of God Nature The One-Straw Revolution A Recapitulation; English translation, published without ISBN by Shou Shin Sha (小心舎).
- 2012 [–1996] – Sowing Seeds in the Desert: Natural Farming, Global Restoration, and Ultimate Food Security, edited by Larry Korn, Chelsea Green.
- 2021 – The Dragonfly Will Be the Messiah, translator Larry Korn, Penguin Classics. ISBN 978-0-24151-444-3

==== Bilingual ====
- 2009 – Iroha Revolutionary Verses (いろは革命歌, Iroha Kakumei Uta), Fukuoka. Contains Masanobu's hand-written classical song-verses and drawings. Bilingual Japanese and English. ISBN 978-4-938743-03-1, ISBN 4-938743-03-5

=== Documentaries ===
- 1982 – The Close To Nature Garden; produced by Rodale Press. 24 minutes. In English.
- 1997 – Fukuoka Masanobu goes to India; produced by Salbong. 59/61 minutes. Available in Japanese or dubbed English.
- 2015 - Final Straw: Food, Earth, Happiness; directed/produced by Patrick M. Lydon and Suhee Kang. 74 minutes. Subtitled in English.

== See also ==
- Conservation agriculture
- Ecoagriculture
- Ecosystem restoration
- Reconciliation ecology
- Rewilding
- Spiritual ecology
- Vandana Shiva
- Shripad Dabholkar
- Bill Mollison
- Arne Næss
- Mokichi Okada
