= Persecution of Muslims =

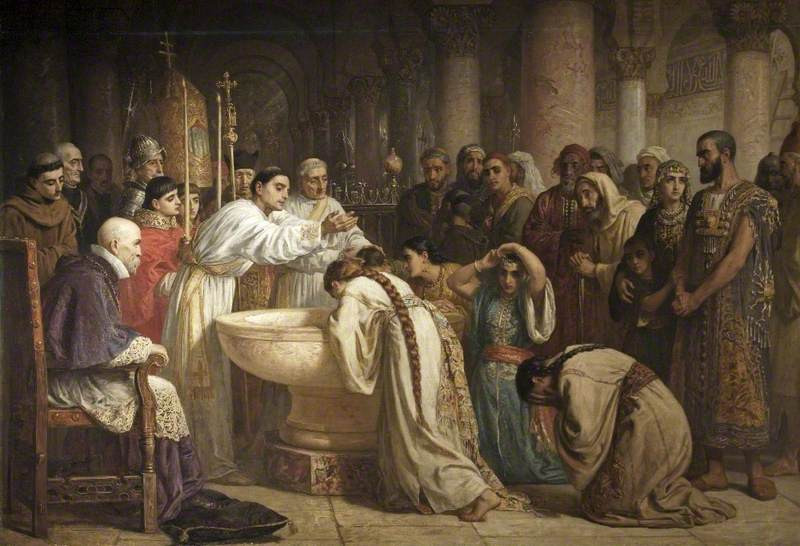
Forced conversions of Muslims in Spain, 16th century. The Moorish Proselytes of Archbishop Ximenes, Granada, 1500 by Edwin Long (1829–1891)

The persecution of Muslims has been recorded throughout the history of Islam, beginning with its founding by Muhammad in the 7th century.

In the early days of Islam in pre-Islamic Arabia, the people who newly converted to Islam were discriminated by the Quraysh tribe, who were adherents of the traditional Arab religion of their time, going as far as spitting, boycotting, beating, and even murdering Muslims. They would also eventually go to war against Muslims for the sole reason that the Muslims did not adhere to their religion. In the medieval era, Muslims faced persecution in European monarchies, such as forced conversions in Spain and the Crusades. In the modern era, Muslims have faced persecutions as minor as being prohibited from wearing abayas in public schools, or as major as committing genocide against them.

== Medieval ==
=== Early Islam ===
In the early days of Islam in Mecca, the people who newly converted to Islam were often subjected to discrimination by the Meccans who had polytheistic views. The skirmishes led to the killing of Sumayya, who was the seventh convert to Islam, who was allegedly tortured by Amr ibn Hisham before his death. Muhammad was also subjected to such discrimination; while he was praying near the Kaaba, Uqba ibn Abu Mu'ayt threw the entrails of a sacrificed camel over him. Abu Lahab's wife Umm Jamil would regularly dump filth outside his door and placed thorns in the path to his house. On the same line, free Muslims were attacked and slaves who converted into Islam were subjected to harsher ordeals to enforce loyalty to erstwhile order of polytheism. Bilal ibn Rabah, who later become the first muezzin, was subjected to physical due to his defiance and was taken out into the desert ordered to forswear his religion and pray to the polytheists' gods and goddesses, until Abu Bakr bought him and freed him.

=== Crusades ===
The First Crusade was launched in 1095 by Pope Urban II, with the stated goal of regaining control of the sacred city of Jerusalem and the Holy Land from the Muslims, which they conquered during Islamic Conquests from the Byzantines in 638 AD. The Fatimid Caliph, Al Hakim of Cairo, known as the "mad Caliph" destroyed numerous churches and synagogues including the Constantinian-era Church of the Holy Sepulchre (the holiest shrine in Christianity) in 1009, as well as other Christian churches and shrines in the Holy Land.

This event, in conjunction with the killing of Germanic pilgrims who were traveling from Byzantium to Jerusalem, raised the anger of Europe, and inspired Pope Urban II to call on all Catholic rulers, knights, and noblemen to recapture Jerusalem from Muslim rule.

The series of events were also linked to the Investiture Controversy, which was a significant conflict between secular and religious powers in medieval Europe. The controversy began as a dispute between the Holy Roman Emperor and the Gregorian Papacy and gave rise to the political concept of Christendom as a union of all peoples and sovereigns under the direction of the pope; as both sides tried to marshal public opinion in their favour, people became personally engaged in a dramatic religious controversy. Also of great significance in launching the crusade were the string of victories by the Seljuk Turks, which saw the end of Arab rule in Jerusalem.

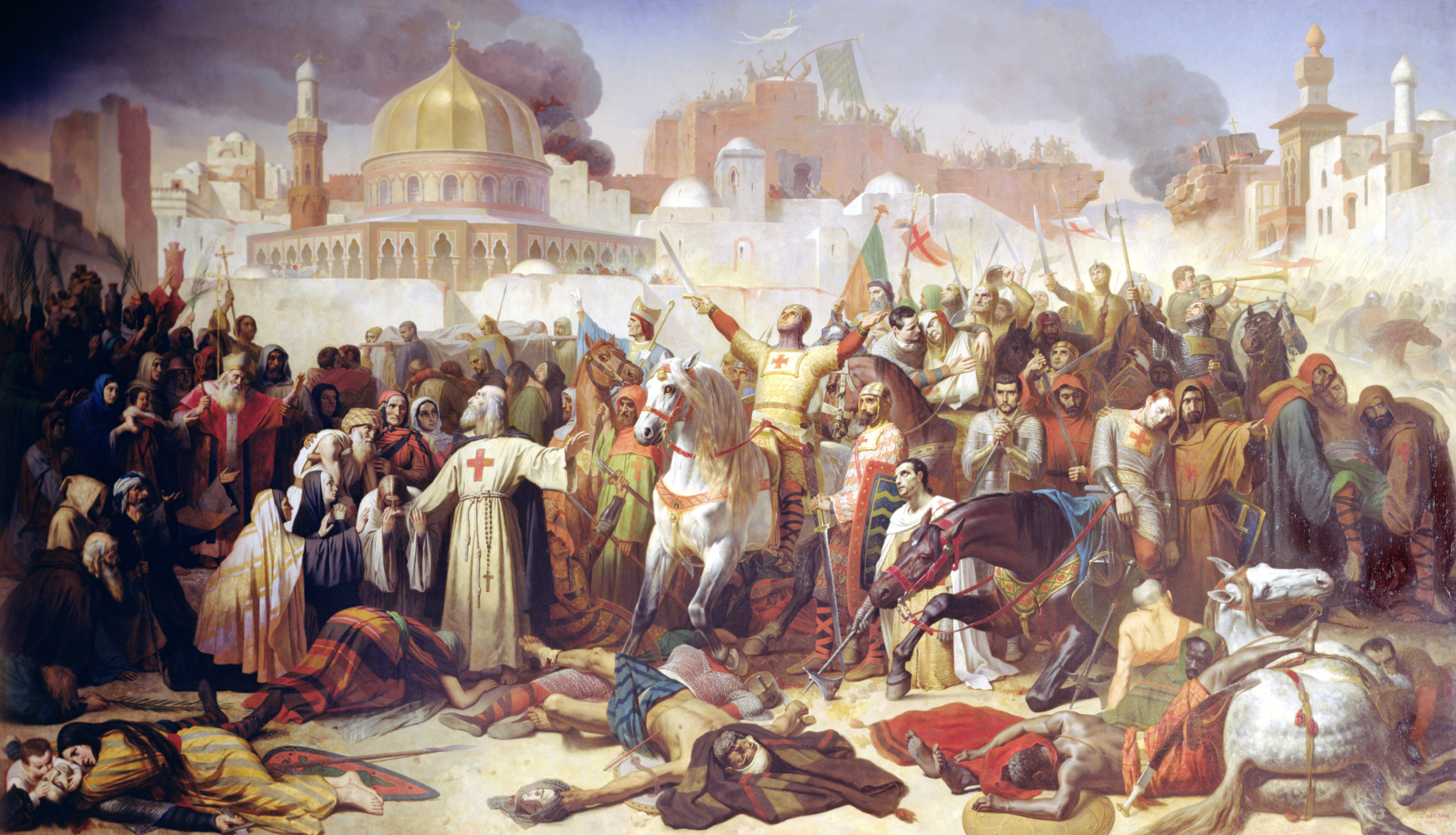
Capture of Jerusalem by the Crusaders in 1099

On 7 May 1099 the Crusaders reached Jerusalem, which had been recaptured from the Seljuks by the Fatimids of Egypt only a year before. On 15 July, the Crusaders were able to end the siege by breaking down sections of the walls and entering the city. Over the course of that afternoon, evening, and next morning, the Crusaders killed almost every inhabitant of Jerusalem, Muslims and Jews alike. Although many Muslims sought shelter atop the Temple Mount inside the Al-Aqsa Mosque, the Crusaders spared few lives. According to the anonymous Gesta Francorum, in what some believe to be one of the most valuable contemporary sources of the First Crusade, "...the slaughter was so great that our men waded in blood up to their ankles...." (which is however rather a literary figure used multiple times in similar context than probable reality). According to Fulcher of Chartres: "Indeed, if you had been there you would have seen our feet coloured to our ankles with the blood of the slain. But what more shall I relate? None of them were left alive; neither women nor children were spared.". Tancred, Prince of Galilee claimed the Temple quarter for himself and offered protection to some of the Muslims there, but he was unable to prevent their deaths at the hands of his fellow Crusaders.

During the massacre committed in Jerusalem during the First Crusade, it was reported that the Crusaders "[circled] the screaming, flame-tortured humanity singing 'Christ We Adore Thee!' with their Crusader crosses held high". Muslims were indiscriminately killed, and Jews who had taken refuge in their synagogue were killed when it was burnt down by the Crusaders.

=== Southern Italy ===
The island of Sicily was conquered by the Aghlabids in the 10th century after over a century of conflict, with the Byzantine Empire losing its final stronghold in 965. The Normans conquered the last Arab Muslim stronghold by 1091. Subsequently, just as Muslims had previously imposed the jizya tax on the non-Muslims of Sicily, the new rulers continued the practice and imposed the same tax now on the Muslims (locally spelled gisia). Another tax on levied them for a time was the augustale. Muslim rebellion broke out during the reign of Tancred as King of Sicily. Lombard pogroms against Muslims started in the 1160s. Muslim and Christian communities in Sicily became increasingly geographically separated. The island's Muslim communities were mainly isolated beyond an internal frontier which divided the south-western half of the island from the Christian north-east. Sicilian Muslims were dependent on royal protection. When King William the Good died in 1189, this royal protection was lifted, and the door was opened for widespread attacks against the island's Muslims. Tolerance towards Muslims ended with increasing Hohenstaufen control. Many oppressive measures, passed by Frederick II, were introduced in order to please the Popes to stop Islam from being practised in Christendom: the result was in a rebellion of Sicily's Muslims. This triggered organized and systematic reprisals which marked the final chapter of Islam in Sicily. The rebellion abated, but direct papal pressure induced Frederick to mass transfer all his Muslim subjects deep into the Italian hinterland. In 1224, Frederick II expelled all Muslims from the island transferring many to Lucera (Lugêrah, as it was known in Arabic) over the next two decades. In this controlled environment they could not challenge royal authority and they benefited the crown in taxes and military service. Their numbers eventually reached between 15,000 and 20,000, leading Lucera to be called Lucaera Saracenorum because it represented the last stronghold of Islamic presence in Italy. During peacetime, Muslims in Lucera were predominantly farmers. They grew durum wheat, barley, legumes, grapes, and other fruits. Muslims also kept bees for honey. The Muslim settlement of Lucera was destroyed by Charles II of Naples with backing from the papacy. The Muslims were either massacred, forcibly converted, enslaved, or exiled. Their abandoned mosques were demolished, and churches were usually built in their place. The Lucera Cathedral was built on the site of a mosque which was destroyed. The mosque was the last one still functioning in medieval Italy by that time. Some were exiled, with many finding asylum in Albania across the Adriatic Sea. Islam was no longer a major presence in the island by the 14th century.

The Aghlabids also conquered the island of Malta at the same time during their invasion of Sicily. Per the Al-Himyari the island was reduced to an uninhabited ruin due to the conquest. The place was later converted into a settlement by Muslims. The Normans conquered it at the same time as Sicily. The Normans however did not interfere in the matters of Muslims of the island and gave them a tributary status. Their conquest however led to the Christianization and Latinization of the island. An annual fine on the Christian community for killing of a Muslim was also repealed in the 12th century, signifying the degradation of the protection given to the Muslims. Most of the Maltese Muslims were deported by 1271. All Maltese Muslims had converted to Christianity by the end of the 15th century and had to find ways to disguise their previous identities by Latinizing or adopting new surnames.

=== Mongol invasions ===
Genghis Khan, and the later Yuan Emperors of China imposed restrictive decrees which forbade Islamic practices like halal butchering and forced Muslims to follow Mongol methods of butchering animals. As a result of these decrees, Muslims were forced to slaughter sheep in secret. Genghis Khan referred to Muslims as "slaves", and he also commanded them to follow the Mongol method of eating rather than the halal one. Circumcision was also forbidden. Toward the end of their rule, the corruption of the Mongol court and the persecution of Muslims became so severe that Muslim generals joined Han Chinese in rebelling against the Mongols. The Ming founder Zhu Yuanzhang employed Muslim generals like Lan Yu who rebelled against the Mongols and defeated them in combat. Some Muslim communities were named "kamsia", which, in Hokkien Chinese, means "thank you"; many Hui Muslims claim that their communities were named "kamsia" because the Han Chinese appreciated the important role which they had played in assisting them to overthrow the Mongols. The Muslims in the Semu class also revolted against the Yuan dynasty in the Ispah Rebellion but the rebellion was crushed and the Muslims were massacred by the Yuan loyalist commander Chen Youding.

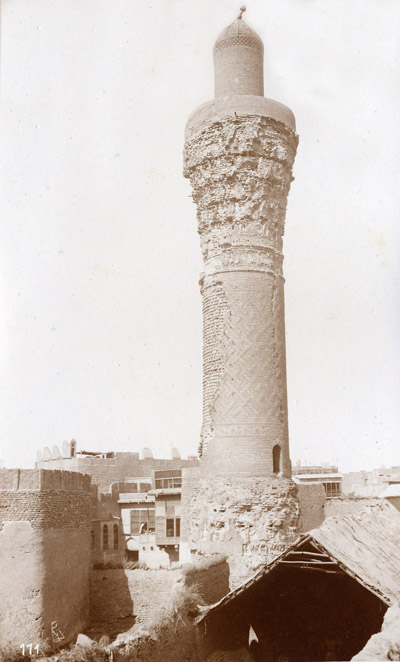
Minaret of Baghdad's al-Khulafa Mosque which was destroyed by the Mongol ruler Hulagu during the 1258 siege

Following the brutal Mongol invasion of Central Asia under Genghis Khan, and the sack of Baghdad which occurred in 1258, the Mongol Empire's rule extended across most Muslim lands in Asia. The Abbasid caliphate was destroyed and the Islamic civilization suffered much devastation, especially in Mesopotamia, and Tengriism and Buddhism replaced it as the official religions of the empire. However, the Mongols attacked people for goods and riches, not because of their religion. Later, many Mongol khans and rulers such as those of the Oljeitu, the Ilkhanid, and the Golden Horde became Muslims along with their subjects. The Mongols made no real effort to replace Islam with any other religion, they just had the desire to plunder goods from anyone who did not submit to their rule, which was characteristic of Mongol warfare. During the Yuan Dynasty which the Mongols founded in China, Muslim scientists were highly regarded and Muslim beliefs were also respected. Regarding the Mongol attacks, the Muslim historian, ibn al-Athir lamented:

I shrank from giving a recital of these events on the account of their magnitude and abhorrence. Even now I come reluctant to the task, for who would deem it a light thing to sing the death song of Islam and the Muslims or find it easy to tell this tale? O that my mother had not given me birth!

The detailed atrocities during the sack of Baghdad include:

- The Grand Library of Baghdad, which contained countless precious historical documents and books on subjects that ranged from medicine to astronomy, was destroyed. Survivors said that the waters of the Tigris ran black with ink from the enormous quantities of books that were flung into the river.
- The city was sacked for seven days, Martin Sickler estimates that around 90,000 of the city residents were killed, and only Christians were spared. Other estimates go much higher. Wassaf claims that the loss of life was several hundred thousand. Ian Frazier of The New Yorker claims that estimates of the death toll range from 200,000 to one million.
- The Mongols looted and destroyed mosques, palaces, libraries, and hospitals. Grand buildings which had taken generations to build were burned to the ground.
- The caliph was captured and forced to watch as his citizens were murdered and his treasury was plundered. According to most accounts, the caliph was killed by trampling. The Mongols rolled the caliph up in a rug, and rode their horses over him, because they believed that the earth would be offended if it were ever touched by royal blood. All but one of his sons were killed, and the sole surviving son was sent to Mongolia, two of his daughters were also spared.
- Hulagu had to move his camp upwind from the city, due to the stench of decay that emanated from its ruins.

At the intervention of Hulagu's Nestorian Christian wife, Dokuz Khatun, the city's Christian inhabitants were spared. Hulagu offered the royal palace to the Nestorian Catholicos Mar Makikha, and he also ordered that a cathedral should be built for him. Ultimately, the seventh ruler of the Ilkhanate, Mahmud Ghazan, converted from Buddhism to Islam, and thus began the gradual decline of Tengrism and Buddhism in the region and its replacement by the renaissance of Islam. Later, three of the four principal Mongol khanates embraced Islam.

Muslim and Jewish paternal cousin marriage was banned by the Yuan dynasty which also forced Muslims to obey Mongol customs like levirate marriage.

=== Iberian Peninsula ===
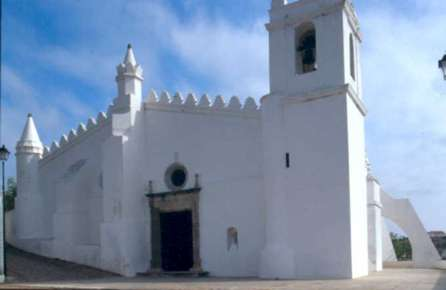
Old Mosque in Mértola, Portugal. Converted into a church.

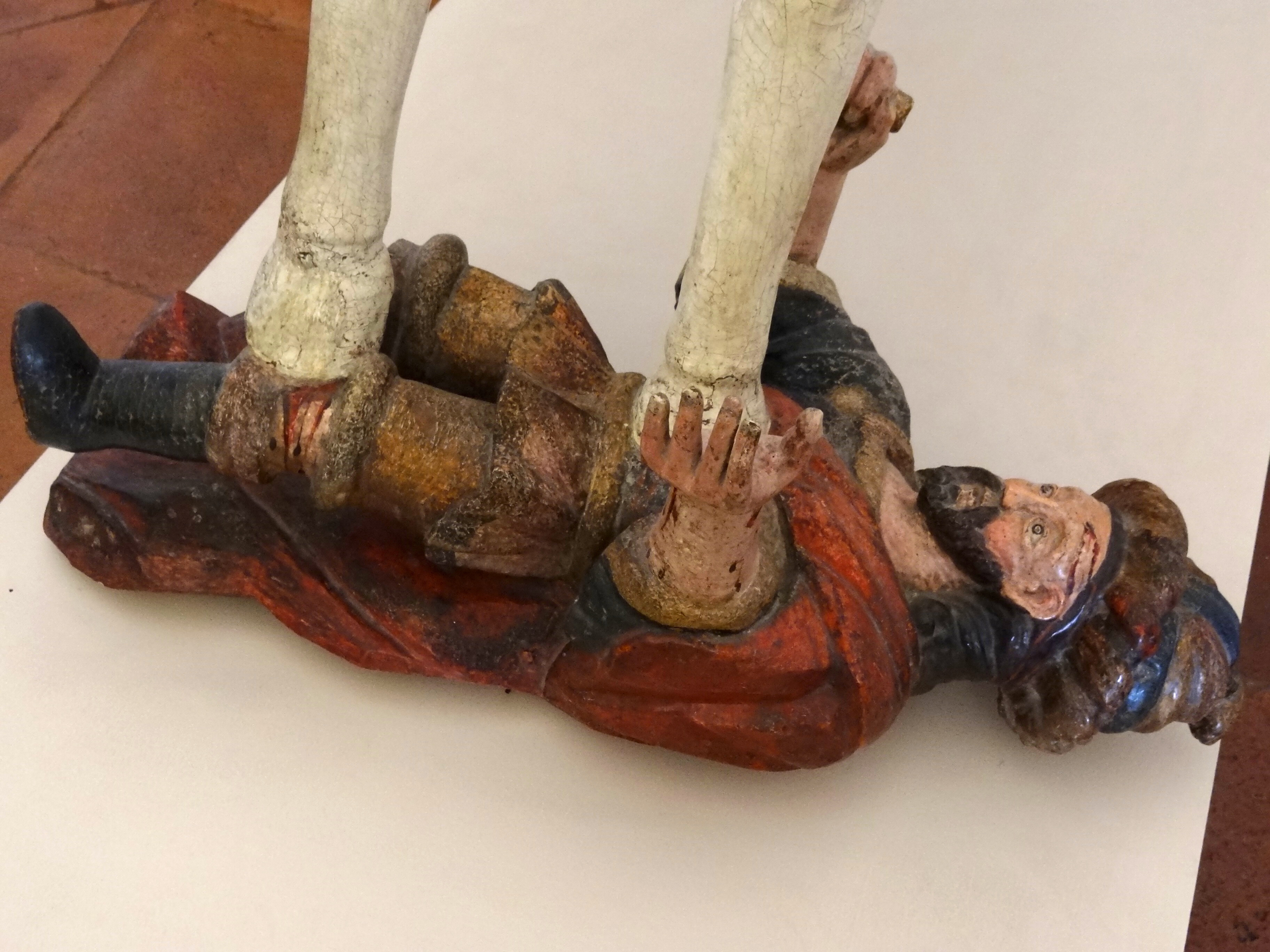
A figure of a Moor being trampled by a conquistador's horse at the National Museum of the Viceroyalty in Tepotzotlan

Arabs relying largely on Berbers conquered the Iberian Peninsula starting in 711, subduing the whole Visigothic Kingdom by 725. The triumphant Umayyads got conditional capitulations probably in most of the towns, so that they could get a compromise with the native population. This was not always so. For example, Mérida, Cordova, Toledo, or Narbonne were conquered by storm or after laying siege on them. The arrangement reached with the locals was based on respecting the laws and traditions used in each place, so that the Goths (a legal concept, not an ethnic one, i.e. the communities ruled by the Forum Iudicum) continued to be ruled on new conditions by their own tribunals and laws. The Gothic Church remained in place and collaborated with the new masters. Al-Andalus or Muslim ruled Iberian peninsula, was conquered by northern Christian kingdoms in 1492, as a result of their expansion taking place especially after the definite collapse of the Caliphate of Cordova in 1031.

The coming of the Crusades (starting with the massacre of Barbastro) and similarly entrenched positions on the northern African Almoravids, who took over al-Andalus as of 1086, added to the difficult coexistence between communities, including Muslims in Christian ruled territory, or the Mozarabic rite Christians (quite different from those of the northern kingdoms), and further minority groups. The Almohads, a fanatic north African sect who later occupied al-Andalus, were the only Iberian Muslim rulers to demand conversion, exile, or death from the Christians and Jews.

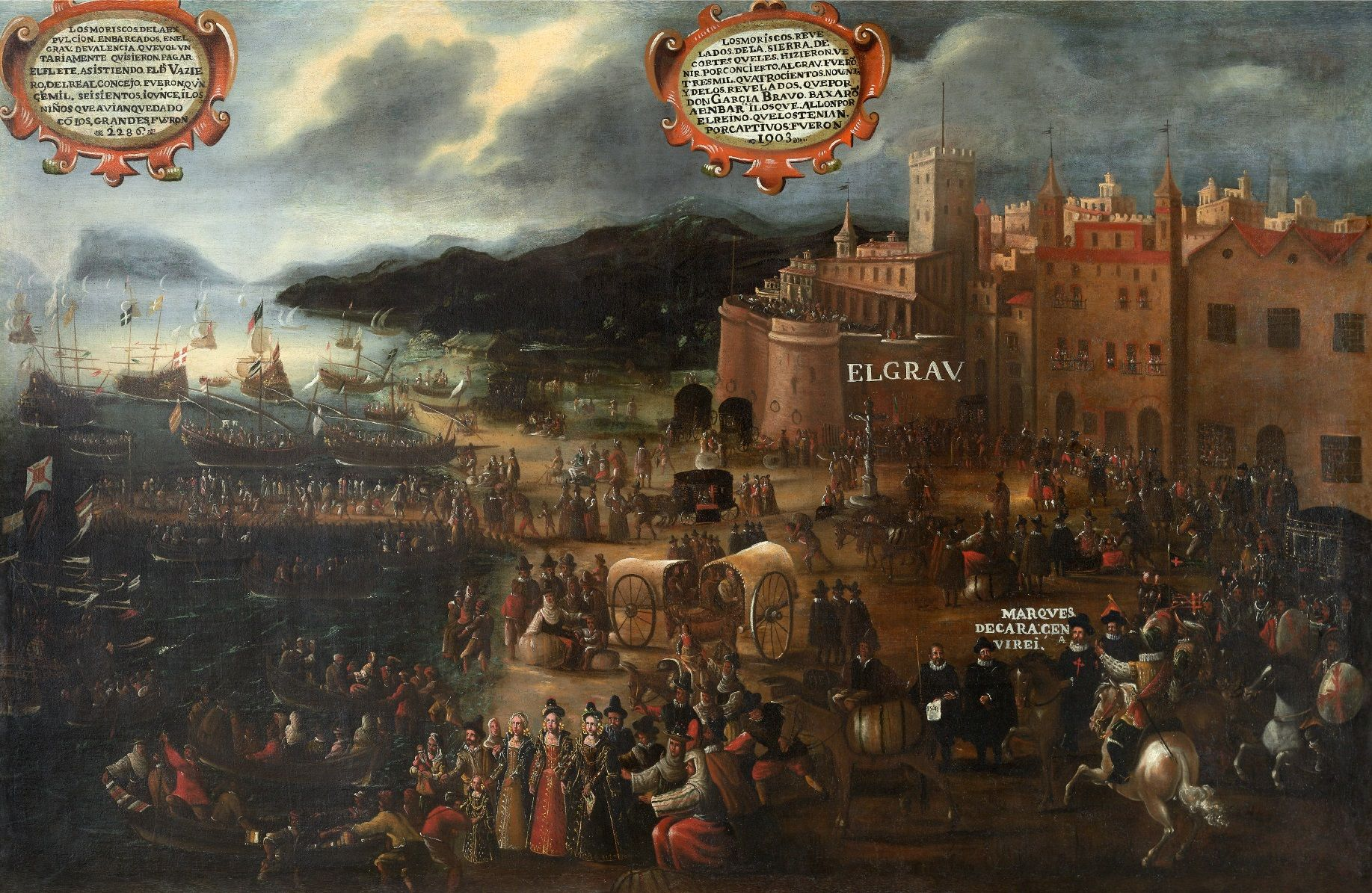
Expulsion of the Moriscos from Valencia

During the expansion south of the northern Christian kingdoms, depending on the local capitulations, local Muslims were allowed to remain (Mudéjars) with extreme restrictions, while some were peacefully converted to the Christian faith. After the conquest of Granada, all the Spanish Muslims were under Christian rule. The new acquired population spoke Arabic or Mozarabic, and the campaigns to convert them were unsuccessful. Legislation was gradually introduced to remove Islam, culminating with the Muslims being forced to convert to Catholicism by the Spanish Inquisition. They were known as Moriscos and considered New Christians. Further laws were introduced, as on 25 May 1566, stipulating that they "had to abandon the use of Arabic, change their costumes, that their doors must remain open every Friday, and other feast days, and that their baths, public and private, to be torn down." The reason doors were to be left open so as to determine whether they secretly observed any Islamic festivals. King Philip II of Spain ordered the destruction of all public baths on the grounds of them being relics of infidelity, notorious for their use by Muslims performing their purification rites. The possession of books or papers in Arabic was near concrete proof of disobedience with severe reprisals and penalties. On 1 January 1568, Christian priests were ordered to take all Morisco children between the ages of three and fifteen, and place them in schools, where they were forced to learn Castilian and Christian doctrine. All these laws and measures required force to be implemented, and from much earlier.

Between 1609 and 1614 the Moriscos were expelled from Spain. They were to depart 'under the pain of death and confiscation, without trial or sentence ... to take with them no money, bullion, jewels, or bills of exchange ... just what they could carry.'

All in all, it is estimated that hundreds of thousands of Muslims (as well as Jews and Protestants) were forcibly converted to Catholicism, expelled, or tortured to death during the Inquisition.

=== Polish–Lithuanian Commonwealth ===
The Lipka Tatars, also known as Polish Tatars or Lithuanian Tatars, were a community of Tatar Muslims who migrated into the Grand Duchy of Lithuania and became Polonized.

The Counter-Reformation of the Catholic Church in the Polish–Lithuanian Commonwealth led to persecution of Muslims, Jews, and Orthodox Christians. The ways the Muslims were persecuted included banning the repair of old mosques and preventing new ones from being constructed, banning serfdom of Christians under Muslims, banning marriage of Christian females to Muslims, putting limitations on property ownership among Tatars and the Polish–Ottoman Wars fed into the discriminatory atmosphere against them and led to anti-Islamic writings and attacks.

=== Sikh Khalsa and Sikh Empire ===
Misr Diwan Chand became the first Hindu governor of Kashmir under Ranjit Singh, after centuries of Muslim rule, since 1320 when Sadr-ud-Din Shah overthrew last king of Kashmir Suhadev of Lohara dynasty. He enacted numerous of laws as per Sikhism. He also changed the taxation, abolishing Jizya hence the taxes of Muslims were increased and made equal to that of non-muslims. He also demolished the Jamia Masjid of Srinagar and prohibited cow slaughter. The punishment for cow slaughter was the death penalty without any exception. Shah Shuja Durrani, the grandson of Ahmad Shah Durrani, wanted to implement similar anti-cow slaughter policies in the Emirate of Afghanistan and with help from Ranjit Singh and the East India Company regained the Afghan throne and imposed a ban on cow slaughter in Kabul.

Sayyid Ahmed Barelvi declared war against Maharaja Ranjit Singh and recruited many Muslims from madrassas. However the Yousufzai and Muhammadzai Khawaneen did not like his egalitarian ideals and betrayed Sayyid Ahmed Shahid and his army at the battle of Balakot and supported the Sikh Army in the Battle of Balakote in 1831, and Barelvi's head was severed by the Sikh General Hari Singh Nalwa.

Muslims still followed Sayyid Ahmed, however he was defeated and died in the battle against Sikh Army which was commanded by Hari Singh Nalwa and Gulab Singh. Raja Aggar Khan of Rajouri was defeated and was brought to Lahore where he was executed by Gulab Singh of Jammu. Raja Sultan Khan of Bhimber also met the same fate when he was defeated and captured by the Dogra ruler Gulab Singh and brought to Jammu where he was imprisoned. Raja Sultan Khan later died in prison.

=== Dutch East India Company ===
The Dutch East India Company aided Japanese samurai who were hired as mercenaries massacred Bandanese who were majorly muslims on the Banda islands, quartering in their religious sites, and executed the Orang Kaya in their conquest of the Banda Islands.

== Modern era ==
=== Americas ===
In his book God's Shadow, historian Alan Mikhail posits that the 1492 voyage to the Americas by Columbus was driven in part by Islamophobic views. European Christians arriving in the Americas perceived local customs as being Islamic and used this as a rationale for genociding the indigenous people. Muslims who were brought to the region as slaves, though mistreated, found several ways to hold onto aspects of their faith.

=== Bulgaria ===
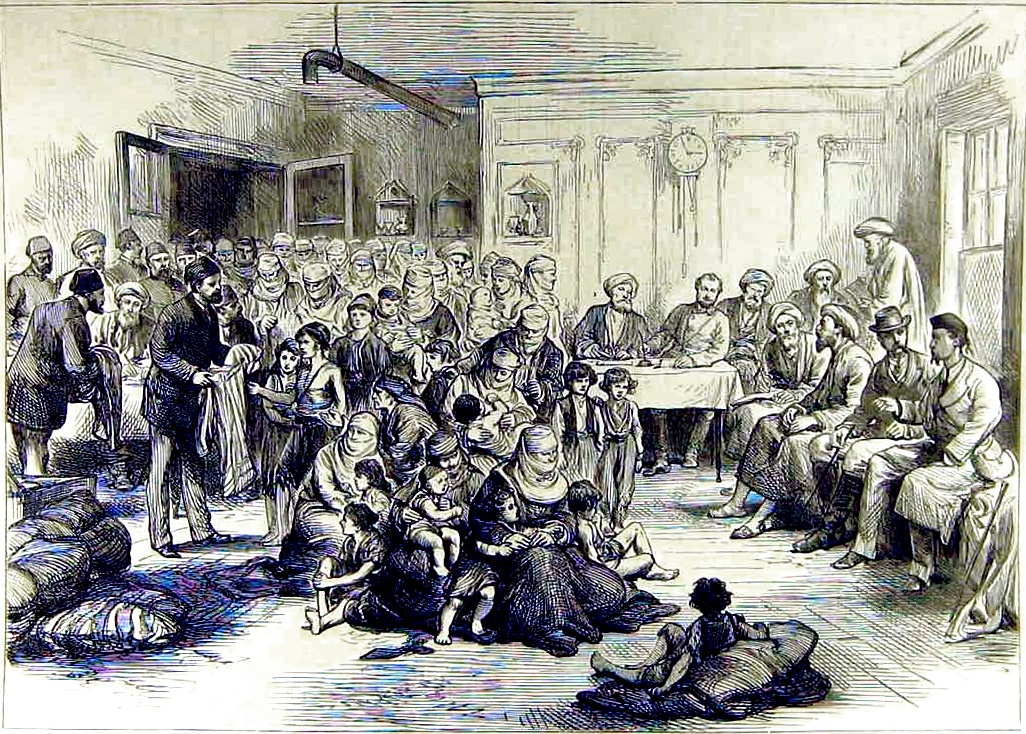
War distribution of clothing to Bulgarian Muslim refugees in Shumla from The Illustrated London News, 17 November 1877

Half a million Muslims succeeded in reaching Ottoman controlled lands and 672,215 of them were reported to have remained after the war. Approximately a quarter of a million of them perished as a result of massacres, cold, disease, and other harsh conditions. According to Aubaret, the French Consul in Ruse in 1876, in the Danube Vilayet which also included Northern Dobruja in today's Romania, as well as a substantial portion of territory in today's southern Serbia, there were 1,120,000 Muslims and 1,233,500 non-Muslims of whom 1,150,000 were Bulgarian. Between 1876 and 1878, through massacres, epidemics, hunger, and war, a large portion of the Turkish population vanished. In 1950-1951 around 155,000 left Bulgaria as a result of Islamophobia and Anti-Turkish sentiment.

=== Cambodia ===
The Cham Muslims experienced serious purges in which as much as half of their community's entire population was exterminated by authoritarian communists in Cambodia during the 1970s as part of the Cambodian genocide. About half a million Muslims were killed. According to Cham sources, 132 mosques were destroyed by the Khmer Rouge regime. Only 20 of the 113 most prominent Cham clerics in Cambodia survived the rule of the Khmer Rouge.

=== China ===
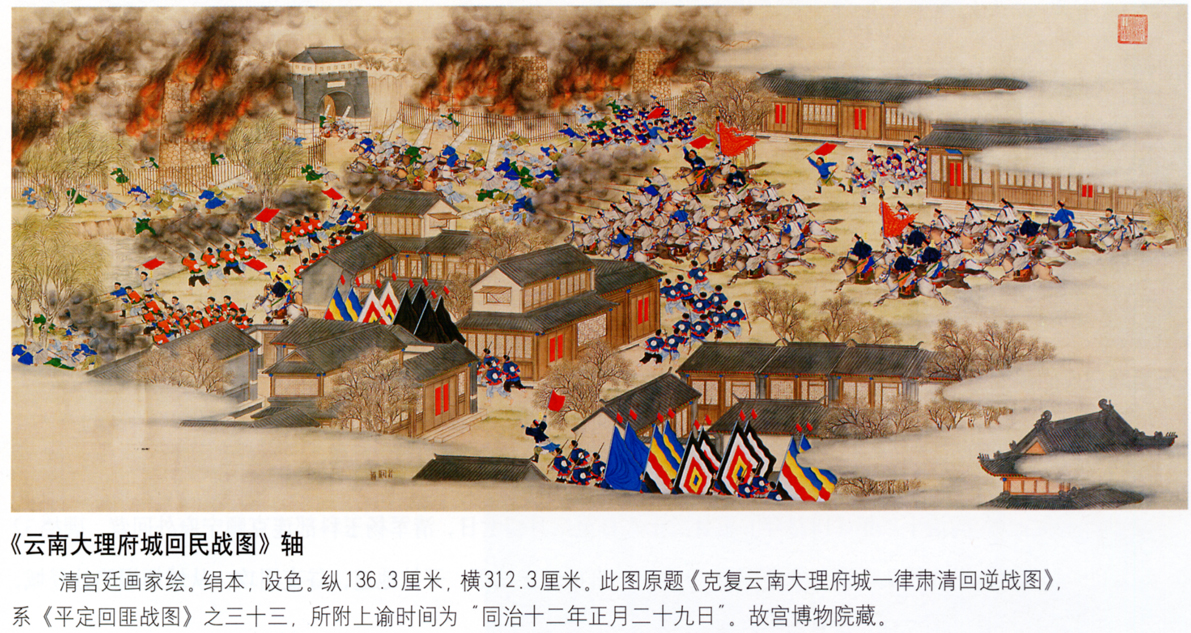
Capture of Dali, the capital of the Pingnan Sultanate in Yunnan, from the set Victory over the Muslims

The Dungan revolt erupted due to infighting between Muslim Sufi sects, the Khafiya and the Jahariyya, and the Gedimu. When the rebellion failed, mass-immigration of the Dungan people into Imperial Russia, Kazakhstan, and Kyrgyzstan ensued. Before the war, the population of Shaanxi province totalled approximately 13 million inhabitants, at least 1,750,000 of whom were Dungan (Hui). After the war, the population dropped to 7 million; at least 150,000 fled. But once-flourishing Chinese Muslim communities fell 93% in the revolt in Shaanxi province. Between 1648 and 1878, around twelve million Hui and Han Chinese were killed in ten unsuccessful uprisings.

The Ush rebellion in 1765 by Uyghur Muslims against the Manchus of the Qing dynasty occurred after Uyghur women were gang raped by the servants and son of Manchu official Su-cheng. It was said that Ush Muslims had long wanted to sleep on [Sucheng and son's] hides and eat their flesh. because of the rape of Uyghur Muslim women for months by the Manchu official Sucheng and his son. The Manchu Emperor ordered that the Uyghur rebel town be massacred, the Qing forces enslaved all the Uyghur children and women and slaughtered the Uyghur men. Manchu soldiers and Manchu officials regularly having sex with or raping Uyghur women caused massive hatred and anger by Uyghur Muslims to Manchu rule. The invasion by Jahangir Khoja was preceded by another Manchu official, Binjing who raped a Muslim daughter of the Kokan aqsaqal from 1818 to 1820. The Qing sought to cover up the rape of Uyghur women by Manchus to prevent anger against their rule from spreading among the Uyghurs.

The Manchu official Shuxing'a started an anti-Muslim massacre which led to the Panthay Rebellion. Shuxing'a developed a deep hatred of Muslims after an incident where he was stripped naked and nearly lynched by a mob of Muslims. He ordered several Hui Muslim rebels to be slowly sliced to death.

The revolts were harshly suppressed by the Manchu government in a manner that amounts to genocide. Approximately a million people in the Panthay Rebellion were killed, and several million in the Dungan revolt as a "washing off the Muslims"(洗回 (xi Hui)) policy had been long advocated by officials in the Manchu government. Many Muslim generals like Ma Zhanao, Ma Anliang, Ma Qianling, Dong Fuxiang, Ma Haiyan, and Ma Julung helped the Qing dynasty defeat the rebel Muslims, and were rewarded, and their followers were spared from the genocide. The Han Chinese Qing general Zuo Zongtang even relocated the Han from the suburbs Hezhou when the Muslims there surrendered as a reward so that Hezhou (now Linxia Hui Autonomous Prefecture) is still heavily Muslim to this day and is the most important city for Hui Muslims in China. The Muslims were granted amnesty and allowed to live as long as they stayed outside the city. Some of the Muslims who fought, like General Dong, did not do it because they were Muslim, rather, like many other generals, they gathered bands of followers and fought at will.

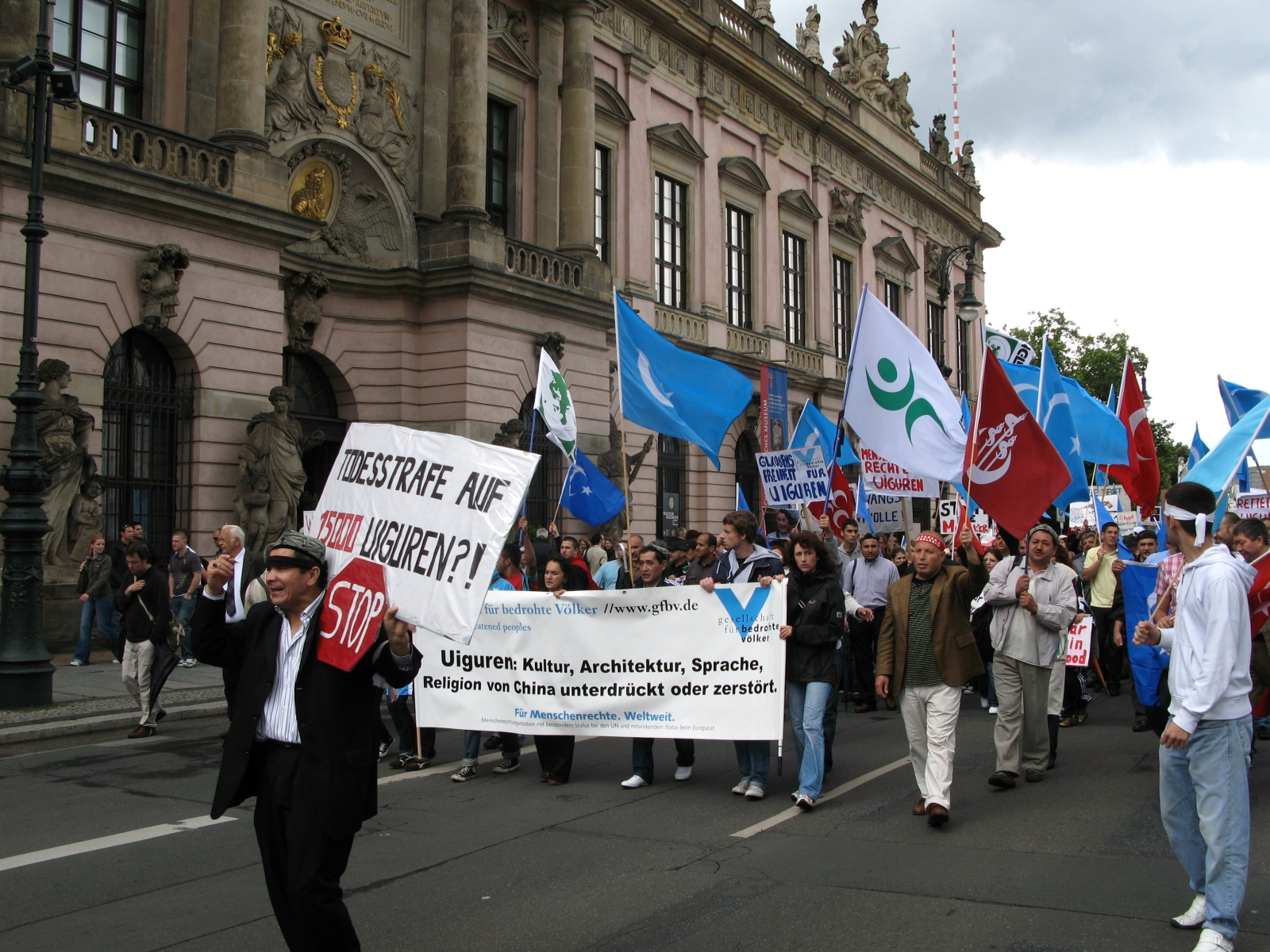
Demonstration in Berlin for Uyghur human rights

Zuo Zongtang generally massacred New Teaching Jahriyya rebels, even if they surrendered, but spared Old Teaching Khafiya and Sunni Gedimu rebels. Ma Hualong belonged to the New Teaching school of thought, and Zuo executed him, while Hui generals belonging to the Old Teaching clique such as Ma Qianling, Ma Zhan'ao, and Ma Anliang were granted amnesty and even promoted in the Qing military. Moreover, an army of Han Chinese rebels led by Dong Fuxiang surrendered and joined Zuo Zongtang. General Zuo accepted the surrender of Hui people belonging to the Old Teaching school, provided they surrendered large amounts of military equipment and supplies, and accepted relocation. He refused to accept the surrender of New Teaching Muslims who still believed in its tenets, since the Qing classified them as a dangerous heterodox cult, similar to the White Lotus Buddhists.

The Qing authorities decreed that the Hui rebels who had taken part in violent attacks were merely heretics and not representative of the entire Hui population, just as the heretical White Lotus did not represent all Buddhists. Qing authorities decreed that there were two different Muslim sects, the "old" religion and "new" religion. The new were heretics and deviated from Islam in the same way that the White Lotus deviated from Buddhism and Daoism, and stated its intention to inform the Hui community that it was aware that the original Islamic religion was one united sect before the advent of new "heretics", saying they would separate Muslim rebels by which sect they belonged to. Zuo also stated that he would accept the surrender of New Teaching Muslims who admitted that they were deceived, radicalized, and misled by its doctrines. Zuo excluded khalifas and mullas from the surrender.

During the Cultural Revolution, mosques along with other religious buildings were often defaced, destroyed, or closed and copies of the Quran were destroyed and cemeteries by the Red Guards. During that time, the government also constantly accused Muslims and other religious groups of holding "superstitious beliefs" and promoting "anti-socialist trends". The government began to relax its policies toward Muslims in 1978, and supported worship and rituals. Today, Islam is experiencing a modest revival and there are now many mosques in China. There has been an upsurge in Islamic expression and many nationwide Islamic associations have been organized to co-ordinate inter-ethnic activities among Muslims.

However, restrictions have been imposed on Uyghur Islamic practices because the Chinese government has attempted to link Islamic beliefs with terrorist activities since 2001. Numerous events have led the Chinese government to crack down on most displays of Islamic piety among Uyghurs, including the wearing of veils and long beards. The Ghulja Incident and the July 2009 Ürümqi riots were both caused by abusive treatment of Uyghur Muslims within Chinese society, and they resulted in even more extreme government crackdowns. While Hui Muslims are seen as being relatively docile, Uyghurs are stereotyped as Islamists and punished more severely for crimes than Hui are. In 1989, China's government banned a book which was titled Xing Fengsu ("Sexual Customs") and placed its authors under arrest after Uyghurs and Hui Muslims protested against its publication in Lanzhou and Beijing because it insulted Islam. Hui Muslims who vandalized property during the protests against the book's publication were not punished but Uyghur protestors were imprisoned.

=== Fascist Italy ===
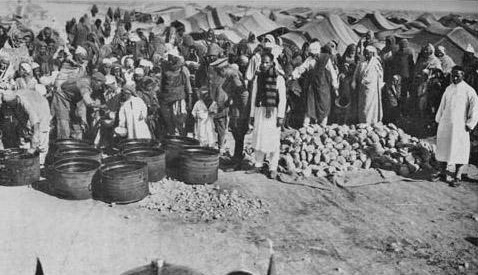
Ten thousand inmates were kept at the concentration camp in El Agheila.

The Libyan genocide was the systematic destruction of the indigenous Libyan Arab people and culture in Italian Libya by the Italian colonial authorities from 1911 to 1943, using the wider definition of genocide, where an estimated 250,000-750,000 Libyans died as a result of colonial-related causes. The most severe and frequent episodes of Italian atrocities against the locals came during the conflict between Italy and the indigenous rebels of the Senussi Order that lasted from 1923 until 1932, when the principal Senussi leader, Omar Mukhtar, was captured and executed. Italy committed major war crimes during the conflict; including the use of chemical weapons, episodes of refusing to take prisoners of war and instead executing surrendering combatants, and mass executions of civilians. During this period, an estimated 83,000-125,000 Libyans were massacred or died in Italian concentration camps.

=== French Algeria ===
Some governments and scholars have called the French conquest of Algeria a genocide. Ben Kiernan, an Australian expert on the Cambodian genocide, wrote in Blood and Soil: A World History of Genocide and Extermination from Sparta to Darfur on the French conquest of Algeria:

By 1875, the French conquest was complete. The war had killed approximately 825,000 indigenous Algerians since 1830. A long shadow of genocidal hatred persisted, provoking a French author to protest in 1882 that in Algeria, "we hear it repeated every day that we must expel the native and if necessary destroy him." As a French statistical journal urged five years later, "the system of extermination must give way to a policy of penetration."

During the French conquest from 1830 to 1875, the native Algerian population fell by up to one-third due to war, massacres, famine and disease. Between 500,000 and 1,000,000 Algerians, out of a total of 3 million, were killed. Atrocities committed by the French during this period include wholesale massacres of civilians, scorched earth tactics, destroying mosques and converting them to Catholic churches, burying people alive, and French horse units throwing boiling water on Algerians perceived to be resisting in any way. During the period of 1954-1962, in the Algerian War, an estimated 400,000-1.5 million Algerians were killed. Atrocities committed by French troops included massacres of civilians, (among which the Setif and Guelma massacre saw 3,000 to 45,000 Algerian civilians killed by French troops and Pied-Noir vigilante mobs), rape, torture by electric shock, burning and beating, burial alive, death flights, sexual assaults, and the use of napalm to indiscriminately burn villages and towns. The French sent over 2 million Algerians to concentration camps, where they were kept in deplorable, prison-like conditions, and destroyed over 8,000 villages during the war. In 2018, France admitted torture was routine and systematic during the Algerian war of independence. Algeria became the prototype for a pattern of French colonial rule which has been described as "quasi-apartheid". Napoleon III oversaw an 1865 decree that allowed Arab and Berber Algerians to request French citizenship – but only if they "renounced their Muslim religion and culture": by 1913, only 1,557 Muslims had been granted French citizenship. Despite periodic attempts at partial reform, the situation of the Code de l'indigénat persisted until the French Fourth Republic, which began in 1946, but although Muslim Algerians were accorded the rights of citizenship, the system of discrimination was maintained in more informal ways. This "internal system of apartheid" met with considerable resistance from the Muslims affected by it, and is cited as one of the causes of the 1954 insurrection.

In response to France's recognition of Armenian genocide, Turkey accused France of committing genocide against 15% of Algeria's population. In October 2021, the office of Algerian president Abdelmadjid Tebboune stated that 5.6 million Algerians had died during the country's 132 years under French colonial rule, while historian Mohammed Al-Amin estimated that the total Algerian death toll could be as high as 10 million.

It is estimated that between 27,000 and 60,000 Algerians were affected by radiation from French nuclear weapons tests in the Algerian Desert, with thousands having long-lasting health effects and deformities due to radiation exposure.

=== French Morocco ===
Generally speaking, French colonialism in Morocco was highly discriminatory against indigenous Moroccans and was detrimental to the Moroccan economy. Native Moroccans were treated as second class citizens and discriminated against in nearly all aspects of life. Additionally, land in Morocco was far more expensive for Moroccans than for French settlers. Various historians have estimated that around 100,000 Moroccans were killed during the French conquest of Morocco between 1907 and 1934. Around 8,000 French soldiers and 12,000 native Moroccans soldiers in the French army were also killed. Historian Daniel Rivet adds that the tally would be significantly higher if including the enormous suffering of the Riffian tribes during the Rif War between 1921 and 1926.

=== Imperial Japan ===
During the World War II, Imperial Japanese forces invaded Burma, now Myanmar. This military conquest resulted in massacre of thousands of Rohingya who were mostly Muslims and Rakhine Buddhists. Japanese forces expelled hundreds of thousands of Rohingya into Bengal in British ruled India. This military conquest resulted in numerous human rights violations. During this period, approximately 220,000 Rohingyas are believed to have migrated the border into Bengal, in British ruled India, to escape the ordeal. After the defeat of Burmese forces approximately 40,000 Rohingyas fled to Chittagong after communal violence and discrimination by Japanese forces.

Japanese forces also carried out massacres, torture, and atrocities on Moro people in Mindanao, and Sulu. A former Japanese Imperial Navy medic, Akira Makino, admitted to carrying out dissections on Moro civilians while they were still alive.

Panglong, a Chinese town in British Burma, was entirely destroyed by the Japanese forces during the Japanese invasion of Burma. The Hui Ma Guanggui became the leader of the Hui Panglong self-defense guard created by Su who was sent by the Kuomintang government of the Republic of China to fight against the Japanese forces of Panglong in 1942. The skirmish resulted in driving out the over 200 Hui households out as refugees. Yunnan and Kokang received Hui refugees from Panglong driven out by the Japanese. One of Ma Guanggui's nephews was Ma Yeye, a son of Ma Guanghua and he narrated the history of Panglong including the Japanese attack. An account of the Japanese attack on the Hui in Panglong was written and published in 1998 by a Hui from Panglong called "Panglong Booklet". The Japanese attack in Burma caused the Hui Mu family to seek refuge in Panglong but they were driven out again to Yunnan from Panglong when the Japanese attacked Panglong.

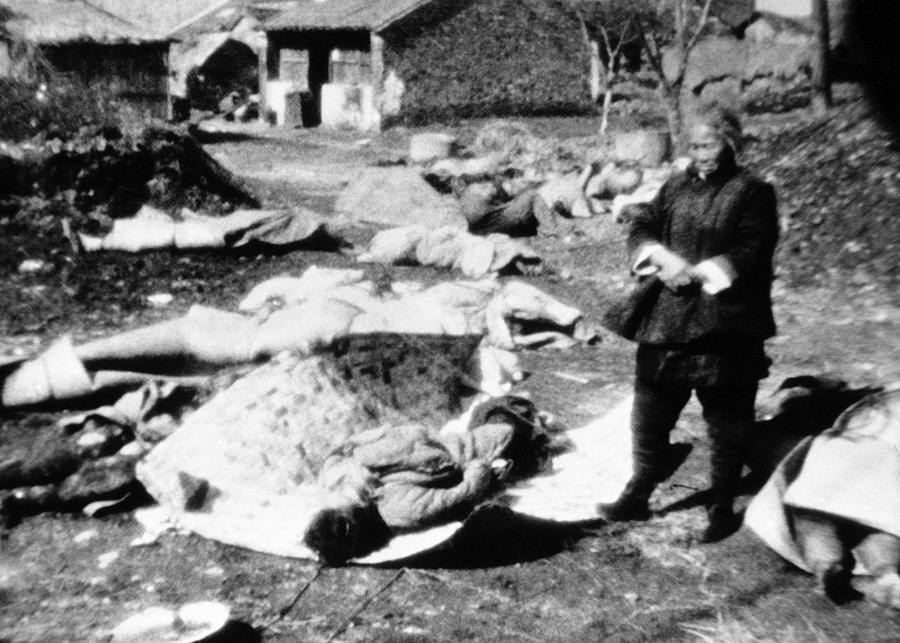
Dead bodies of the Chinese Hui Muslim Ha family who were slaughtered and raped by the Japanese in Nanjing. The photo comes from Case 5 of John Magee's film. On 13 December 1937, about 30 Japanese soldiers murdered all but two of 11 Chinese Hui Muslims from the Ha family in the house at No. 5 Xinlukou. A woman and her two teenaged daughters were raped, and Japanese soldiers rammed a bottle and a cane into her vagina. An eight-year-old girl was stabbed, but she and her younger sister survived. They were found alive two weeks after the killings by the elderly woman shown in the photo. Bodies of the victims can also be seen in the photo.

During the Second Sino-Japanese war the Japanese destroyed numerous religious sites. According to Wan Lei, "Statistics showed that the Japanese destroyed more than 200 relgious sites and killed countless Hui people by April 1941." After the Nanjing Massacre many monasteries in Nanjing were found to be filled with corpses. They also tried to corner Hui communities economically by destroying factories which resulting in many Hui becoming jobless and homeless. Soldiers also desecrated religious sites forcing Hui to feed pork to the soldiers, and forcing girls to supposedly train as geishas and singers. Hui cemeteries were also destroyed for military reasons.

The Japanese brought Indonesian Javanese girls to British Borneo as comfort women to be raped by Japanese officers at the Ridge road school and Basel Mission Church, and the Telecommunication Center Station (former rectory of the All Saints Church) in Kota Kinabalu as well as ones in Balikpapan and Beaufort. Japanese soldiers raped Indonesian women and Dutch women in the Netherlands East Indies. They got infected with STDs.

Sukarno prostituted Indonesian girls from ethnic groups like Minangkabau to the Japanese.

The Japanese massacred Hui Muslims in their mosques in Nanjing and destroyed Hui mosques in other parts of China. Shen Xi'en and his father Shen Decheng witnessed the corpses of Hui Muslims slaughtered by the Japanese in Nanjing, when he was asked by Hui people to help bury their relatives. The Hui security maintenance leader Sun Shurong and Hui Imams Zhang Zihui, Ma Zihe, Ge Changfa, Wang Shouren, Ma Changfa were involved in collecting Hui corpses and burying them after the Nanjing massacre. The Ji'e lane Mosque caretaker father Zhang was in his 60s when killed by the Japanese and his decomposing corpse was the first to be washed in accordance with Islamic customs and buried. They buried the Hui corpses in Jiuhua mountain, Dongguashi, Hongtu Bridge (where Guangzhou road is now located), Wutai mountain, Donguashi (where Nanjing Normal University is located). Shen Xi'en helped bury 400 Hui bodies including children, women and men. Shen recalled burying a 7 or 8 year old boy in addition to his mother among the Hui bodies.

Japanese used machine guns to massacre Muslim Suluk children and women at a mosque in the aftermath of the Jesselton revolt.

=== Indonesia ===
The Walisongo school massacre was the slaughter carried out by Christian militants on May 28, 2000, upon several predominantly villages around Poso town, Central Sulawesi, Indonesia as part of a broader sectarian conflict in the Poso region. Officially, the total number killed in the attacks is between 191–200

=== Syria ===
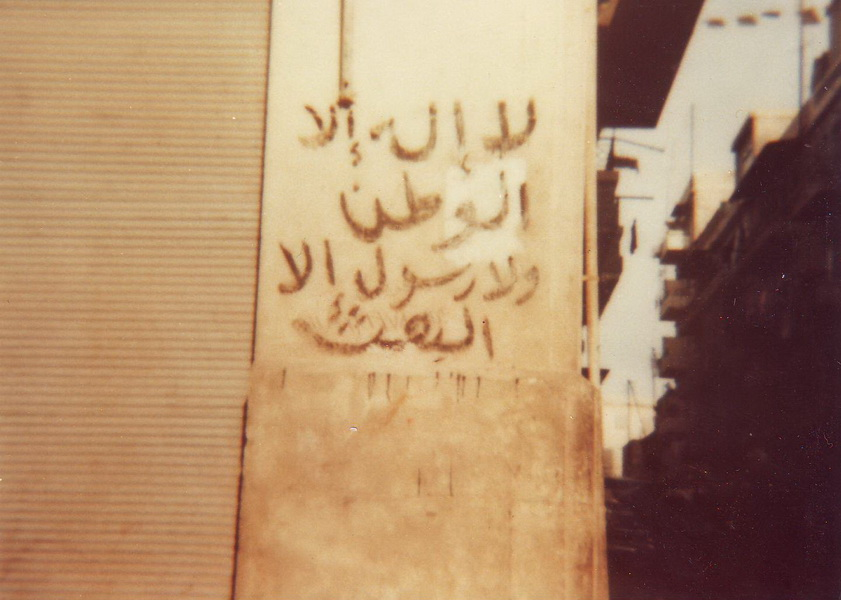
Anti-Islam Ba'athist writings on the walls of Hama city following the Hama Massacre in 1982. The propaganda slogan, which translates to "There is no god but the homeland, and there is no messenger but the Ba'ath party", denigrated the Shahada (Islamic testimony of faith).

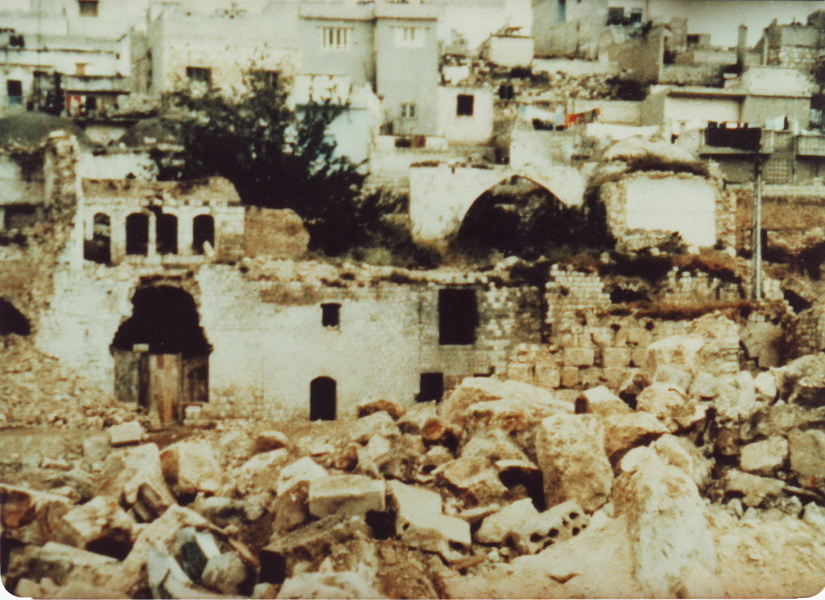
A photo showing the destruction of Hama city after the massacre

The Hama massacre was a genocidal campaign of extermination launched by Ba'athist Syria in February 1982, under orders of Syrian dictator Hafez al-Assad to crush an uprising by the Muslim Brotherhood in Sunni-majority town of Hama. Hama was besieged for 27 days by Syrian military and Ba'athist paramilitaries, during which period the city was isolated from the outside. The ground operations of the massacre were supervised by Rifaat al-Assad, the brother of Hafez al-Assad, who commanded sectarian Alawite deathsquads such as the Defense Companies.

Prior to the start of operations, Hafez al-Assad issued orders to seal off Hama from the outside world; effectively imposing a media blackout, total shut down of communications, electricity and food supplies to the city for months. Then the massacre campaign was launched, which involved indiscriminate attacks, military bombardment, aerial attacks, etc. The indiscriminate bombings and mass-shootings by paramilitaries had razed much of the city to the ground and killed tens of thousands of civilians. Patrick Seale, reporting in The Globe and Mail, described the operation as a "two-week orgy of killing, destruction and looting" which destroyed the city and killed a minimum of 25,000 inhabitants. However, contemporary estimates put the total death toll to at least 40,000 civilians. The massacre is the "single deadliest act" of violence perpetrated by any Arab regime upon its own population, in Modern Arab history.

The attack has been described as a "genocidal massacre" which was motivated by the anti-Sunni sectarianism of the Alawite-dominated elites of the Arab Socialist Ba'ath party. The militant secularist ideology of neo-Ba'athism which advocated the elimination of religion and the establishment of socialism in the society also played a role in the brutality of the massacre. Memory of the massacre remains an important aspect of Syrian culture and evokes strong emotions amongst Syrians to the present day. Women, children and all Hama inhabitants irrespective of their political leanings were targeted indiscriminately during the military onslaught. Even Ba'ath party members and their families became victims of slaughter and mass-shootings of Rifaat al-Assad's paramilitaries. Internationally, the Hama massacre became a symbol of the Assad regime's brutal repression of the Syrian population and its disregard for the lives of civilians.

=== Myanmar ===
Myanmar has a Buddhist majority. The Muslim minority in Myanmar mostly consists of the Rohingya people and the descendants of Muslim immigrants from India (including the modern-day nations of Bangladesh) and China (the ancestors of Chinese Muslims in Myanmar came from Yunnan province), as well as the descendants of earlier Arab and Persian settlers. Indian Muslims were brought to Burma by the British in order to aid them in clerical work and business. After independence, many Muslims retained their previous positions and achieved prominence in business and politics.

At first, the Buddhist persecution of Muslims arose for religious reasons, and it occurred during the reign of King Bayinnaung, 1550–1589 AD. He also disallowed the Eid al-Adha, the religious sacrifice of cattle, regarding the killing of animals in the name of religion as a cruel custom. Halal food was also forbidden by King Alaungpaya in the 18th century.

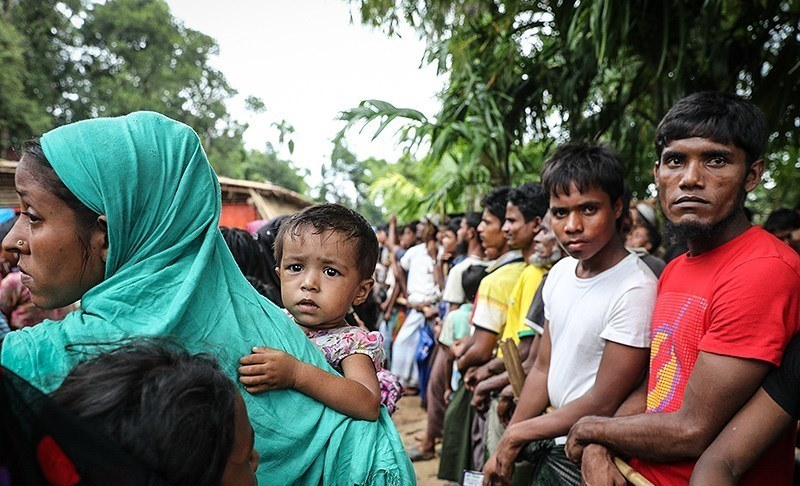
Rohingya Muslims at the Kutupalong refugee camp in Bangladesh, October 2017

When General Ne Win came to power in 1962, muslims numbers were reduced in the army and marginalized. Many Rohingya fled Burma as refugees to neighboring Bangladesh including 200,000 who fled Burma in 1978 as a result of the King Dragon operation in Arakan followed by 250,000 in 1991.

During the 2012 Rakhine State riots, a series of clashes followed that primarily involved the ethnic Rakhine Buddhist people and the muslims in the northern Rakhine State which resulted in an estimated 90,000 people getting displaced.

=== Nazi Germany ===
The Nazi ideology's racial theories considered ethnic groups which were associated with Islam, particularly Arabs, "racially inferior".

During the invasion of France, thousands of Muslims, both Arabs and sub-Saharan Africans, who were serving in French colonial units were captured by the Germans. Massacres of these men were widespread, the most notable of these massacres was committed against Moroccans by Waffen-SS troops during the fighting which occurred around Cambrai, the Moroccans were killed en masse after they were driven from the outskirts of the city and surrendered.

During Operation Barbarossa, the Einsatzgruppen engaged in the mass execution of over 140,000 Soviet prisoners of war, many of whom were killed because they had "Asiatic features". Many were often mistaken for Jews and were executed. In 1942 in Amersfoort in the Netherlands, 101 Soviet Uzbek soldiers were massacred by Nazi Germans after they were forced into a concentration camp and displayed to the local Dutch people as proof the Soviets were made out of "untermenschen". Various Muslim ethnic groups were targeted for extermination, such as the Turkmens.

=== Philippines ===
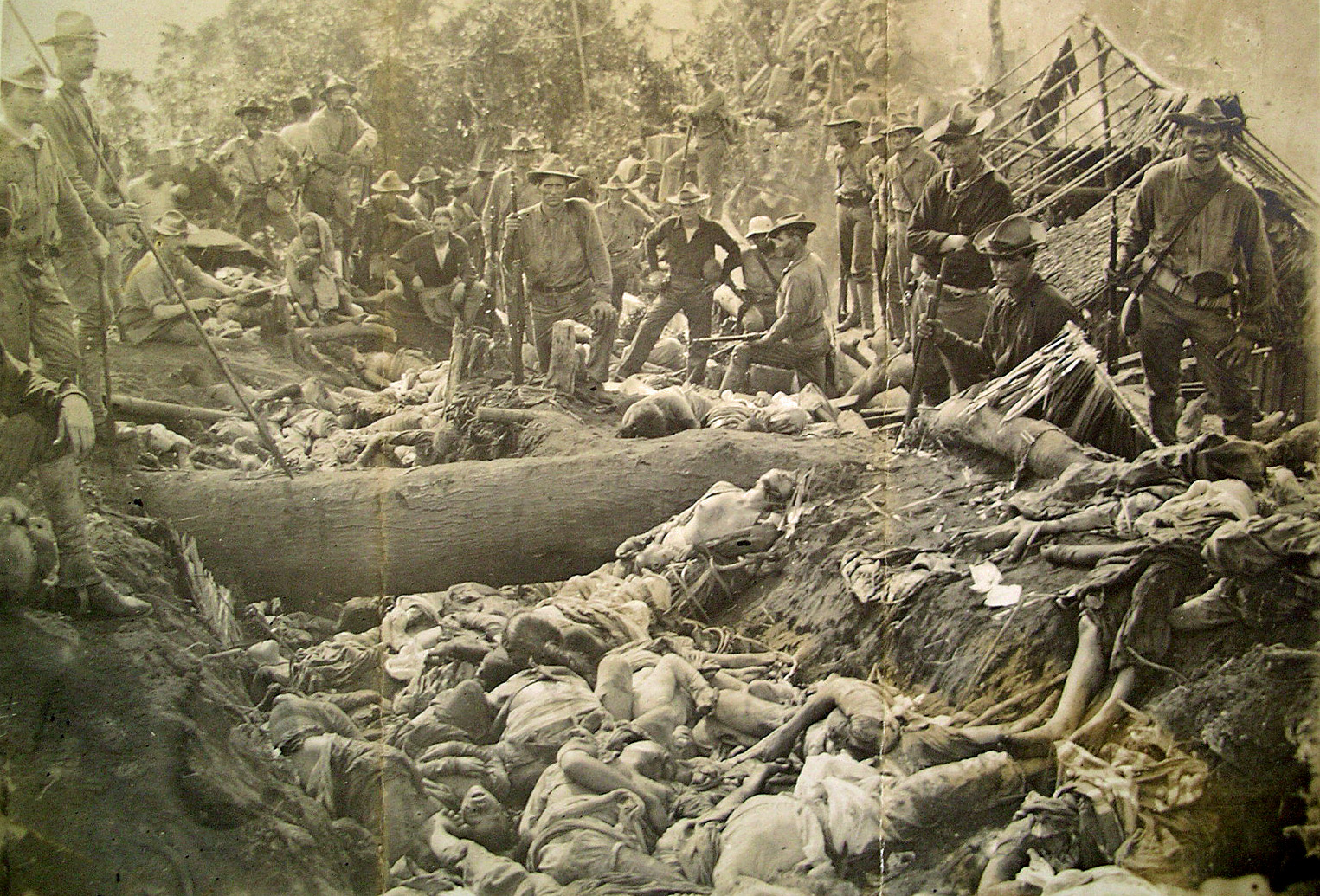
U.S. soldiers pose with Moro dead after the Moro Crater massacre in 1906

The Philippines is a predominantly Christian society with a complicated history of relations between Islam and Christianity. Despite historic evidence of Islamization spreading throughout the islands in the 13th–16th centuries, the archipelago came under Spanish rule in the 16th century. The Spanish proselytized many natives, and labelled those who remained Muslims as Moro, a derogatory term recalling the Moors, an Islamic people of North Africa who occupied parts of Spain for several centuries. Today, this term Moro is used to refer to the indigenous Muslim tribes and ethnic groups of the country. When the Spanish came to the Philippine islands, most of the natives in Luzon and Visayas were pagans with Muslim minorities, and while Spanish proselytized many natives, many Muslims in Luzon and Visayas were not exempted by the Spaniards from the Spanish Inquisition, wherein Muslims to become Catholics or else die for their faith. Those who remained Muslims are only the natives of Mindanao and Sulu which the Spaniards failed to subjugate, or had control of only briefly and partially.

The Spanish–Moro Wars between Spanish colonial authorities and the indigenous Sultanates of the Moro peoples (the Sultanate of Sulu, confederation of sultanates in Lanao and Sultanate of Maguindanao) further escalated tensions between the Christian and Muslim groups of the country. The Moros fought in the Moro Rebellion against the Americans during which Americans massacred Moro women and children at the Moro Crater massacre, against the Japanese in World War II, and are waging an insurgency against the Philippines.

The pro-Philippine government Ilaga militia, composed of Catholic and other Christian settlers on Moro land in Mindanao, were known for their atrocities and massacres against Moro civilians. The Ilaga's bloodiest attack happened in June 1971 when they slaughtered 65 Moro civilians in a Mosque during the Manili massacre. On 24 September 1974, in the Malisbong massacre, the Armed Forces of the Philippines slaughtered about 1,500 Moro Muslim civilians who were praying in a Mosque, in addition to mass raping Moro girls who had been taken aboard a boat.

Polls have shown that some non-Muslim Filipinos hold negative views directed against the Moro people.

=== Russia ===
==== Russian Empire ====
The period from the conquest of Kazan in 1552 to the ascension of Catherine the Great in 1762, was marked by systematic repression of Muslims through policies of exclusion and discrimination as well as the destruction of Muslim culture by elimination of outward manifestations of Islam such as mosques. The first wave of persecution and forced conversions of Muslims to Christianity occurred soon after the Russian conquest of the Kazan and Astrakhan Khanates.

Another period of intense mosque destruction and anti-Muslim oppression from the Russian authorities occurred during the 18th century. During the reign of Anna of Russia, many Muslims were forced or pressured to convert. New converts were exempted from paying taxes, were granted certain privileges, and were given better resources for the learning of their new faith. Many continued to secretly practice Islam and were crypto-Muslims.

The Russians initially demonstrated a willingness in allowing Islam to flourish as Muslim clerics were invited into the various region to preach to the Muslims, particularly the Kazakhs whom the Russians viewed as "savages" and "ignorant" of morals and ethics. However, Russian policy shifted toward weakening Islam by introducing pre-Islamic elements of collective consciousness. Such attempts included methods of eulogizing pre-Islamic historical figures and imposing a sense of inferiority by sending Kazakhs to highly elite Russian military institutions. In response, Kazakh religious leaders attempted to bring religious fervor by espousing pan-Turkism, though many were persecuted as a result.

While total expulsion as in other Christian nations such as Spain, Portugal, and Sicily was not feasible to achieve a homogeneous Russian Orthodox population, other policies such as land grants and the promotion of migration by other Russian and non-Muslim populations into Muslim lands displaced many Muslims making them minorities in places such as some parts of the South Ural region to other parts such as the Ottoman Turkey, and almost annihilating the Circassians, Crimean Tatars, and various Muslims of the Caucasus. The Russian army rounded up people, driving Muslims from their villages to ports on the Black Sea, where they awaited ships provided by the neighbouring Ottoman Empire. The explicit Russian goal was to expel the groups in question from their lands. They were given a choice as to where to be resettled: in the Ottoman Empire or in Russia far from their old lands. Only a small percentage (the numbers are unknown) accepted resettlement within the Russian Empire. The trend of Russification has continued at different paces during the remaining Tsarist period and under the Soviet Union, so that today there are more Tatars living outside the Republic of Tatarstan than inside it.

Alexander Suvorov announced the capture of Ismail in 1791 to the Tsarina Catherine in a doggerel couplet, after the assault had been pressed from house to house, room to room, and nearly every Muslim man, woman, and child in the city had been killed in three days of uncontrolled massacre, 40,000 muslims dead, a few hundred taken into captivity. For all his bluffness, Suvorov later told an English traveller that when the massacre was over he went back to his tent and wept.

During the Circassian genocide, general Grigory Zass in sent the severed Circassian heads to Berlin for anatomical studies. The Decembrist Nikolai Ivanovich Lorer said that Zass cleaned and boiled the flesh off the heads after storing them under his bed in his tent. He also had Circassian heads outside of his tent impaled on lances on a hill. Circassian men's corpses were decapitated by Russian-Cossack women on the battlefield after the battles were over for the heads to be sent to Zass for collection. Zass erected Circassian heads on poles outside of his tent and witnesses saw the wind blowing the beards of the heads. Russian soldiers and Cossacks were paid for sending Circassian heads to General Zass. Besides cutting Circassian heads off and collecting them, Zass employed a deliberate strategy of annihilating Circassian en masse, burning entire Circassian villages with the people in it and encouraging violation of Circassian women and children. Zass' forces referred to all Circassian elderly, children women, and men as "Bandits, "plunderers", or "thieves" and the Russian empire's forces were commanded by ferociously partholofical officers who commanded political dissidents and criminals. Cossacks raped Circassian women and impregnated them with children. Circassian children were scared of Zass and he was called the devil (Iblis) by the Circassians.

Russians raped Circassian girls during the 1877 Russo-Turkish war from the Circassian refugees who were settled in the Ottoman Balkans. Circassian girls were sold into Turkish harems by their relatives. Circassians also raped and murdered Bulgarians during the 1877 Russo-Turkish war. Circassian women in the Balkans were raped by Russian soldiers in the Russo-Turkish war of 1877.

==== Soviet Union ====
The Soviet Union was hostile to all forms of religion, which was "the opium of the masses" in accordance with Marxist ideology. Relative religious freedom existed for Muslims in the years following the revolution, but in the late 1920s the Soviet government took a strong anti-religious turn. Many mosques were closed or torn down. During the period of Joseph Stalin's leadership, Crimean Tatar, Chechen, Ingush, Balkar, Karachay, and Meskhetian Turk Muslims were victims of mass deportation. Though it principally targeted ethno-religious minorities, the deportations were officially based on alleged collaborationism during the Nazi occupation of Crimea. The deportation began on 17 May 1944 in all Crimean inhabited localities. More than 32,000 NKVD troops participated in this action. 193,865 Crimean Tatars were deported, 151,136 of them to Uzbek SSR, 8,597 to Mari ASSR, 4,286 to Kazakh SSR, the rest 29,846 to the various oblasts of the Russian Soviet Federative Socialist Republic.

From May to November, 10,105 Crimean Tatars died of starvation in Uzbekistan (7% of deported to Uzbek SSR). Nearly 30,000 (20%) died in exile during the year and a half by the NKVD data and nearly 46% by the data of the Crimean Tatar activists. According to Soviet dissident information, many Crimean Tatars were made to work in the large-scale projects conducted by the Soviet Gulag system of slave labour camps.

=== South-eastern Europe (Balkans) ===
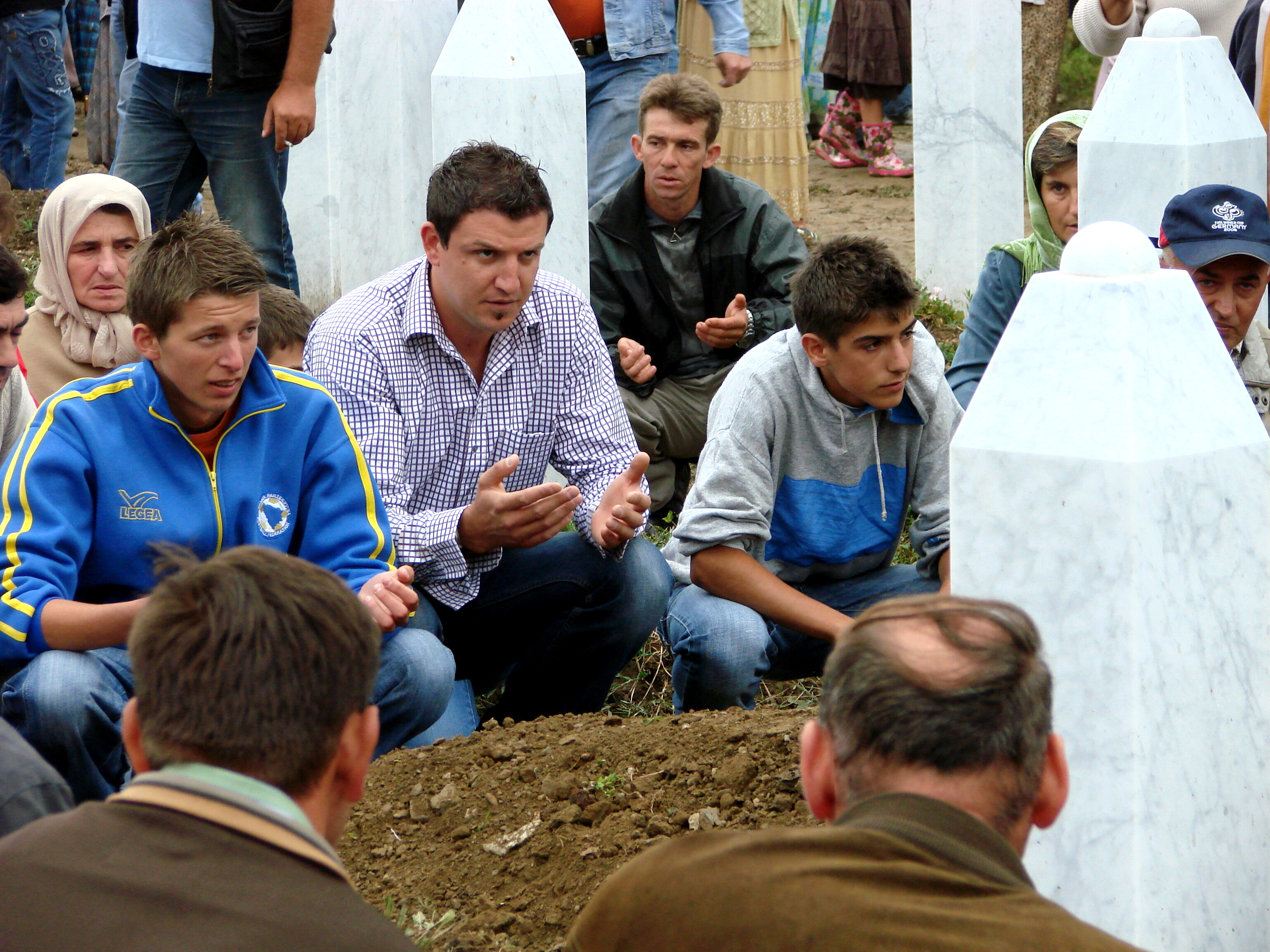
Mourners at the reburial ceremony for an exhumed victim of the Srebrenica massacre in Bosnia

As the Ottoman Empire entered a permanent phase of decline in the late 17th century it was engaged in a protracted state of conflict, losing territories both in Europe and the Caucasus. The victors were the Christian states, the old Habsburg and Romanov Empires, and the new nation-states of Greece, Serbia, Romania, and Bulgaria. Rival European powers encouraged the development of nationalist ideologies among the Ottoman subjects in which the Muslims were portrayed as an ethnic "fifth column" left over from a previous era that could not be integrated into the planned future states. The struggle to rid themselves of Ottomans became an important element of the self-identification of the Christians of the Balkans.

Following the Habsburg and Holy League victory in the Great Turkish War, the second Ottoman failure to take Vienna, and other major battlefield defeats to Habsburg Austria and its allies in the late 17th century, the Ottoman Empire fell into a state of decline in Southeastern Europe. During this period, the Habsburg, Venetian, and other allied Holy League troops committed widespread atrocities against the Muslim population, coinciding with the Ottoman withdrawal from the area. Hungary, Croatia, Dalmatia, and Slavonia were all lost to the advancing Habsburg and Venetian troops, and the Muslims in these areas were massacred, enslaved, forcibly converted to Catholicism, or banished to Muslim-ruled lands such as Bosnia. Nearly all Ottoman-Islamic infrastructure and religious sites in Croatia, including mosques and graveyards, were destroyed or repurposed following the expulsion of the Ottomans from the area. These events “enjoyed the benediction of the Catholic Church.” For example, cities like Skopje (1689) and Sarajevo (1697) were sacked and burned to the ground by Habsburg troops, causing widespread devastation and killing tens of thousands of people. After Zenta and the burning of Sarajevo to the ground, Habsburg forces of Prince Eugene of Savoy laid waste to Bosnia during their retreat, destroying Turkish settlements along the line of his retreat and taking the women and children as slaves. Following the reconquest of Buda in 1686, the Habsburg Austrian and other Holy League troops likewise took their fury out on the hated “heathens” of the city, massacring around 3,000 Muslims and enslaving another c. 6,000.

According to Mark Levene, the Victorian public in the 1870s paid much more attention to the massacres and expulsions of Christians than to massacres and expulsions of Muslims, even if on a greater scale. He further suggests that such massacres were even favoured by some circles. Mark Levene also argues that the dominant powers, by supporting "nation-statism" at the Congress of Berlin, legitimized "the primary instrument of Balkan nation-building": ethnic cleansing. Hall points out that atrocities were committed by all sides during the Balkan conflicts. Deliberate terror was designed to instigate population movements out of particular territories. The aim of targeting the civilian population was to carve ethnically homogeneous countries.

Muslims were forced to leave Principality of Serbia in 1862. Muslim Albanians, along smaller numbers of urban Turks (some with Albanian heritage), were expelled by the Serb army from most parts of the Sanjak of Niş and fled to the Kosovo Vilayet and Macedonia during and after the Serbian–Ottoman War (1876–78). An estimated 49–130,000 Albanians were either expelled, fled and/or retreated from the captured areas seeking refuge in Ottoman Kosovo. The departure of the Albanian population from these regions was done in a manner that today would be characterized as ethnic cleansing.

Justin McCarty estimates that between 1821 and 1922 around five and a half million Muslims were driven out of Europe and five million more were killed or died of disease and starvation while fleeing. Cleansing occurred as a result of the Serbian and Greek independence in the 1820s and 1830s, the Russo-Turkish War 1877–1878, and culminating in the Balkan Wars 1912–1913. Mann describes these acts as "murderous ethnic cleansing on stupendous scale not previously seen in Europe" referring to the 1914 Carnegie Endowment report. It is estimated that at the turn of the 20th century there were 4,4 million Muslims living in the Balkan regions under Ottoman control. More than one million Muslims left the Balkans in the last three decades of the 19th century. Between 1912 and 1926 nearly 2.9 million Muslims were either killed or forced to emigrate to Turkey.

Between 10,000 and 30,000 Turks were killed in Tripolitsa by Greek rebels in the summer of 1821, including the entire Jewish population of the city. Similar events as these occurred elsewhere during the Greek Revolution resulting in the eradication and expulsion of virtually the entire Turkish population of the Morea. These acts ensured the ethnic homogenization of the area under the rule of the future modern Greek state. According to claims by Turkish delegations, in 1878 the Muslim inhabitants in Thessaly are estimated to be 150,000 and in 1897 the Muslims numbered 50,000 in Crete. By 1919 there were virtually no Muslims left in Thessaly and only 20,000 in Crete.

In the Bulgarian insurgency of the April Uprising in 1876 an estimate of 1,000 Muslims were killed. During the Russo-Turkish War large numbers of Turks were either killed, perished, or became refugees. There are different estimates about the casualties of the war. Crampton describes an exodus of 130,000–150,000 expelled of which approximately half returned for an intermediary period encouraged by the Congress of Berlin. Hupchick and McCarthy point out that 260,000 perished and 500,000 became refugees. The Turkish scholars Karpat and Ipek argue that up to 300,000 were killed and 1–1.5 million were forced to emigrate. Members of the European press who covered the war in Bulgaria reported on the Russian atrocities against Muslims. Witness accounts from Schumla and Razgrad describe children, women, and elderly wounded by sabres and lances. They stated that the entire Muslim population of many villages had been massacred. Recently uncovered photographs in the archive of the German Ministry of Foreign Affairs from the Russo-Turkish War 1877–1878 show the massacre of Muslims by the Russians in the region of Stara Zagora claiming to have affected some 20,000 Muslim civilians.

Massacres against Turks and Muslims during the Balkan Wars in the hands of Bulgarians, Greeks, and Armenians are described in detail in the 1912 Carnegie Endowment report. The Bulgarian violence during the Balkan War included burning of villages, transforming mosques into churches, rape of women, and mutilation of bodies. It is estimated that 220,000 Pomaks were forcefully Christianized and forbidden to wear Islamic religious clothing.

During World War II, the Chetniks, a Yugoslav Royalist and Serbian nationalist movement, committed numerous war crimes primarily directed against the non-Serb population of the Kingdom of Yugoslavia explicitly ordering the ethnic cleansing, mainly 29,000–33,000 Muslims were killed.

Also during World War II, Muslims faced sporadic but significant and violent persecution at the hands of the Croatian fascist Ustaše movement in the Independent State of Croatia. Despite Ustaše overtures and positive propaganda towards Muslims, the government in Zagreb in reality staunchly favored Catholics in the military, government and ministry positions, with Muslim militias being regarded as little more than cannon fodder with little to no combat effectiveness. Catholics held the vast majority of high ranking government offices, leading to complaints and protests from Muslim religious leaders. The archbishop of Sarajevo had stated that the situation had become critical for Muslims due to violent persecution from both the Serbian Chetniks and Croatian fascists. According to some reports, as many as 100,000 Muslims had been killed and 250,000 displaced by the Ustaše by 1943. There were also reports of forced conversions of Muslims to Catholicism. One German officer reportedly remarked that "the Muslims bear the special status of being persecuted by all others."

=== Tatarstan ===
The 1921–1922 famine in Tatarstan was a period of mass starvation and drought that took place in the Tatar ASSR as a result of war communism policy, in which 500,000 to 2,000,000 peasants died. The event was part of the greater Russian famine of 1921–1922 that affected other parts of the USSR, in which up 5,000,000 people died in total. According to Roman Serbyn, a professor of Russian and East European history, the Tatarstan famine was the first man-made famine in the Soviet Union and systematically targeted ethnic minorities such as Volga Tatars and Volga Germans. The 1921–1922 famine in Tatarstan has been compared to Holodomor in Ukraine, and in 2008, the All-Russian Tatar Social Center (VTOTs) asked the United Nations to condemn the 1921–22 Tatarstan famine as genocide of Muslim Tatars.

=== Turkey ===
During World War I, both Turks and Kurds were killed by Russians and Armenians in the eastern provinces of the Ottoman Empire in retaliation for Turkish persecution of Christians (Armenian genocide and Greek genocide).

The Republic of Turkey was founded on a strict interpretation of secularism by the war-hero turned statesman, Mustafa Kemal Atatürk. In the early republican era, the revolutionary Kemalist government had sought to actively de-Islamize society and turn Turkey into a fully Westernized country. The Kemalists had perceived religion, Islam in particular, to be a force of backwardness. As such, they cracked down on many outward expressions of Islam, whether orthodox or heterodox-folk manifestations of it. They wanted religion to be solely limited to the "conscience of individuals". The fifth Turkish prime minister, Şükrü Saracoğlu, had allegedly desired the abolition of religion altogether through government restrictions. The government had all shariah courts (including those relating to personal civil law) and traditional madrasas dissolved. The teaching of Arabic, and the Arabic adhaan, was also banned. The fez (an Ottoman Islamic head gear) was also banned, with European hats being mandated instead. Those who opposed this mandate were dealt with harshly. However, the military regime under Kenan Evren had softened its stance on Islam, seeing it as an alternative to communism. The Turkish generals had also promoted Turkish-Sunni Islam to counter Islamism, amidst the Iranian Revolution.

=== Vietnam ===
The Vietnamese Emperor Minh Mạng unleashed persecution of Cham Muslims after he conquered the final remnants of Champa in 1832. The Vietnamese coercively fed lizard and pig meat to Cham Muslims and cow meat to Cham Hindus against their will to punish them and assimilate them to Vietnamese culture.

== Present day ==
=== Africa ===
==== Burkina Faso ====
On 11 October 2019 a mass shooting occurred in a mosque in northern Burkina Faso which left 16 people dead and two injured. It happened while the residents were praying inside the Grand Mosque in Salmossi, a village close to the border with Mali. AFP reported that 13 people died on the spot while 3 died later due to the injuries.

==== Central African Republic ====
During the internal armed conflict in the Central African Republic in 2013, anti-balaka militiamen were targeting Bangui's Muslim neighbourhoods and Muslim ethnic groups such as the Fulas.

Early 2014 marked a turning point; hardened by war and massacres, the anti-balaka committed multiple atrocities. In 2014, Amnesty International reported several massacres committed by anti-balaka against Muslim civilians, forcing thousands of Muslims to flee the country.

On 24 June 2014, anti-balaka gunmen killed 17 Muslim Fula people at a camp in Bambari. Some of the bodies were mutilated and burnt by the assailants.

On 11 October 2017, 25 Muslim civilians were massacred by anti-balaka militiamen inside a mosque in the town of Kembe.

==== Chad ====
In February 1979, anti-Muslim riots occurred in southern Chad, as a result hundreds or thousands of Muslim civilians died.

==== Ethiopia ====
In April 2022, a group of Christian extremists opened fire during a Muslim funeral, killing more than 20 people. Amidst sectarian tensions, two mosques were burnt down and two other mosques were damaged. "'In the apparent retaliatory attacks that followed, two Orthodox Christian men were reportedly burnt to death, another man hacked to death, and five churches burnt down'" in the southwest of the country.

==== Mali ====
On 23 March 2019, several attacks by gunmen killed at least 160 and injured at least 55 Muslim Fulani herdsmen, because of the allegations that the villagers were involved in supporting Islamic terrorism. Two villages, Ogossagou and Welingara, were particularly affected.

=== Asia ===
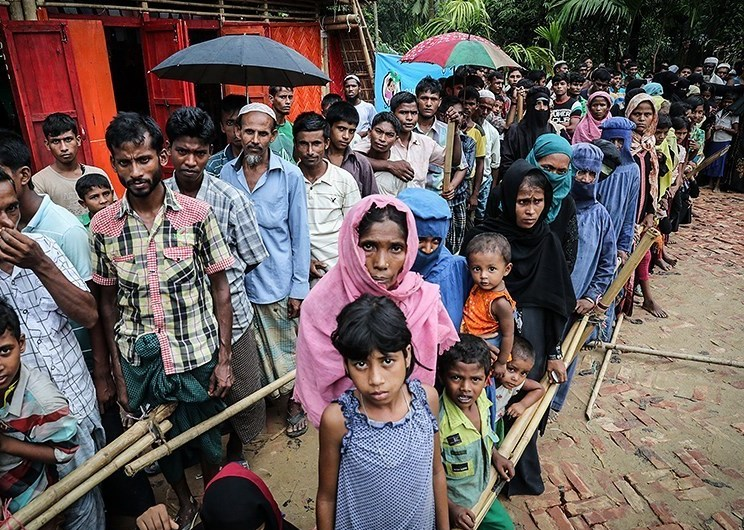
Rohingya refugees in Bangladesh, October 2017

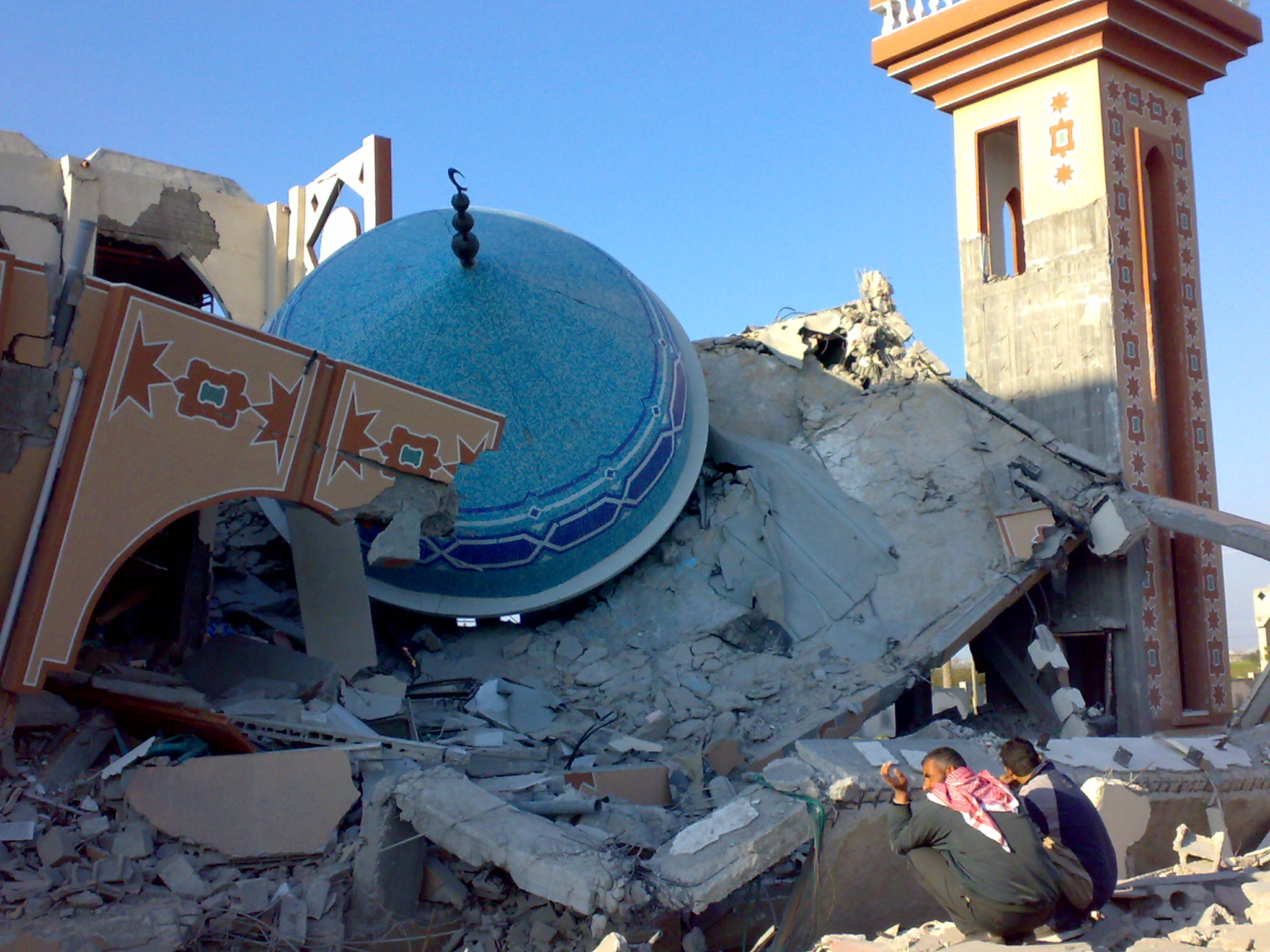
Mosque in Gaza, destroyed during the Gaza War, 2009

==== Azerbaijan ====
In Nardaran, a deadly incident broke out in 2015 between Azerbaijan security forces and religious Shia residents in which two policemen and four suspected Shia Muslim militants were killed, which came to be known as Nardaran events.

As a result of this incident, the Azerbaijani parliament passed laws prohibiting people with religious education received abroad to implement Islamic rites and ceremonies in Azerbaijan, as well as to preach in mosques and occupy leading positions in the country; as well as prohibiting the display of religious paraphernalia, flags, and slogans, except in places of worship, religious centers, and offices. Ashura festivities in public have also been banned. The Azerbaijani government also passed a law to remove the citizenship of Azerbaijani citizens who fight abroad.

The Azerbaijan authorities cracked down on observant Sunni Muslims.

==== China ====
===== Hainan Island =====
Hainan is China's southernmost region inhabited by the Utsul Muslim population of approximately 10,000. In September 2020, the hijab was banned in schools in the region.

Earlier in 2019, a CCP document titled "Working Document regarding the strengthening of overall governance over Huixin and Huihui Neighbourhood" described a number of measures to be taken on the Utsuls, including increased surveillance of residents in Muslim neighbourhoods, ban on traditional dress in schools and government offices, rebuilding of mosques to a smaller size and without "Arabic tendencies", removal of Arabic script from shopfronts, along with words like "halal" and "Islamic".

===== Tibet =====
When Hui started migrating into Lhasa in the 1990s, rumours circulated among Tibetans in Lhasa about the Hui, such as that they were cannibals or ate children. In February 2003, Tibetans rioted against Hui, destroying Hui-owned shops and restaurants. Local Tibetan Buddhist religious leaders led a regional boycott movement that encouraged Tibetans to boycott Hui-owned shops, spreading the myth that Hui put the ashes of cremated imams in the cooking water they used to serve Tibetans food, in order to convert Tibetans to Islam.

In Tibet, the majority of Muslims are Hui people. Hatred between Tibetans and Muslims stems from events during the Muslim warlord Ma Bufang's oppressive rule in Qinghai such as Ngolok rebellions (1917–49) and the Sino-Tibetan War, but in 1949 the Communists put an end to the violence between Tibetans and Muslims, however, new Tibetan-Muslim violence broke out after China engaged in liberalization. Riots broke out between Muslims and Tibetans over incidents such as bones in soups and prices of balloons, and Tibetans accused Muslims of being cannibals who cooked humans in their soup and of contaminating food with urine. Tibetans attacked Muslim restaurants. Fires set by Tibetans which burned the apartments and shops of Muslims resulted in Muslim families being killed and wounded in the 2008 mid-March riots. Due to Tibetan violence against Muslims, the traditional Islamic white caps have not been worn by many Muslims. Scarfs were removed and replaced with hairnets by Muslim women in order to hide. Muslims prayed in secret at home when in August 2008 the Tibetans burned the Mosque. Incidents such as these which make Tibetans look bad on the international stage are covered up by the Tibetan exile community. The repression of Tibetan separatism by the Chinese government is supported by Hui Muslims. In addition, Chinese-speaking Hui have problems with Tibetan Hui (the Tibetan speaking Kache minority of Muslims).

On 8 October 2012, a mob of about 200 Tibetan monks beat a dozen Dungans (Hui Muslims) in Luqu County, Gansu province, in retaliation for the Chinese Muslim community's application to build a mosque in the county.

The main Mosque in Lhasa was burned down by Tibetans and Chinese Hui Muslims were violently assaulted by Tibetan rioters in the 2008 Tibetan unrest. Tibetan exiles and foreign scholars like ignore and do not talk about sectarian violence between Tibetan Buddhists and Muslims. The majority of Tibetans viewed the wars against Iraq and Afghanistan after 9/11 positively and it had the effect of galvanizing anti-Muslim attitudes among Tibetans and resulted in an anti-Muslim boycott against Muslim owned businesses. Tibetan Buddhists propagate a false libel that Muslims cremate their Imams and use the ashes to convert Tibetans to Islam by making Tibetans inhale the ashes, even though the Tibetans seem to be aware that Muslims practice burial and not cremation since they frequently clash against proposed Muslim cemeteries in their area.

Since the Chinese government supports and backs up the Hui Muslims, the Tibetans deliberately attack the Hui Muslims as a way to demonstrate anti-government sentiment and because they have a background of sectarian violence against each other since Ma Bufang's rule due to their separate religions and ethnicity and Tibetans resent Hui economic domination.

===== Xinjiang =====
An event and cultural program in Washington, D.C., protesting the Uyghur genocide in East Turkestan, 2014

The city of Karamay has banned Islamic beards, headwear, and clothing on buses. China's far-western Xinjiang province have passed a law to prohibit residents from wearing burqas in public. China has also banned Ramadan fasting for Chinese Communist Party (CCP) members in certain parts of Xinjiang. Amnesty International has said Uyghurs face widespread discrimination in employment, housing, and educational opportunities, as well as curtailed religious freedom and political marginalization. Uyghurs who choose to practice their faith can only use a state-approved version of the Koran; men who work in the state sector cannot wear beards and women cannot wear headscarves. The Chinese state controls the management of all mosques, which many Uyghurs feel stifles religious traditions that have formed a crucial part of their identity for centuries. Children under the age of 18 are not allowed to attend religious services at mosques. According to Radio Free Asia in April 2017, the CCP banned Islamic names such as "Saddam", "Hajj", and "Medina" for babies born in Xinjiang. Since 2017, it is alleged that China has destroyed or damaged 16,000 mosques in China's Xinjiang province – 65% of the region's total.

According to human rights organizations and western media Uyghurs face discrimination and religious persecution at the hands of the government authorities. In a 2013 news article, The New York Times reported, "Many Uighurs are also convinced that Beijing is seeking to wipe out their language and culture through assimilation and education policies that favor Mandarin over Uighur in schools and government jobs. Civil servants can be fired for joining Friday afternoon prayer services, and Uighur college students say they are often required to eat lunch in school cafeterias during the holy month of Ramadan, when observant Muslims fast." Chinese authorities have confiscated passports from all residents in largely Muslim region of Xinjiang, populated by Turkic-speaking Uyghurs.

In August 2018, the United Nations said that credible reports had led it to estimate that up to a million Uighurs and other Muslims were being held in "something that resembles a massive internment camp that is shrouded in secrecy". The U.N.'s International Convention on the Elimination of All Forms of Racial Discrimination said that some estimates indicated that up to 2 million Uighurs and other Muslims were held in "political camps for indoctrination", in a "no-rights zone". Conditions in Xinjiang had deteriorated that they were described by political scientists as "Orwellian".

These so-called "re-education" camps and later, "vocational training centres", were described by the government for "rehabilitation and redemption" to combat terrorism and religious extremism. In response to the UN panel's finding of indefinite detention without due process, the Chinese government delegation officially conceded that it was engaging in widespread "resettlement and re-education" and State media described the controls in Xinjiang as "intense".

On 31 August 2018, the United Nations committee called on the Chinese government to "end the practice of detention without lawful charge, trial, and conviction", to release the detained persons, to provide specifics as to the number of interred individuals and the reasons for their detention, and to investigate the allegations of "racial, ethnic, and ethno-religious profiling". A BBC report quoted an unnamed Chinese official as saying that "Uighurs enjoyed full rights" but also admitting that "those deceived by religious extremism... shall be assisted by resettlement and re-education". On 10 September 2018, UN High Commissioner for Human Rights Michelle Bachelet urged China to allow observers into Xinjiang and expressed concern about the situation there. She said that: "The UN rights group had shown that Uyghurs and other Muslims are being detained in camps across Xinjiang and I expect discussions with Chinese officials to begin soon".

The U.S. Uyghur Human Rights Policy Act of 2020 imposes sanctions on foreign individuals and entities responsible for human rights violations in China's Xinjiang region.

==== India ====
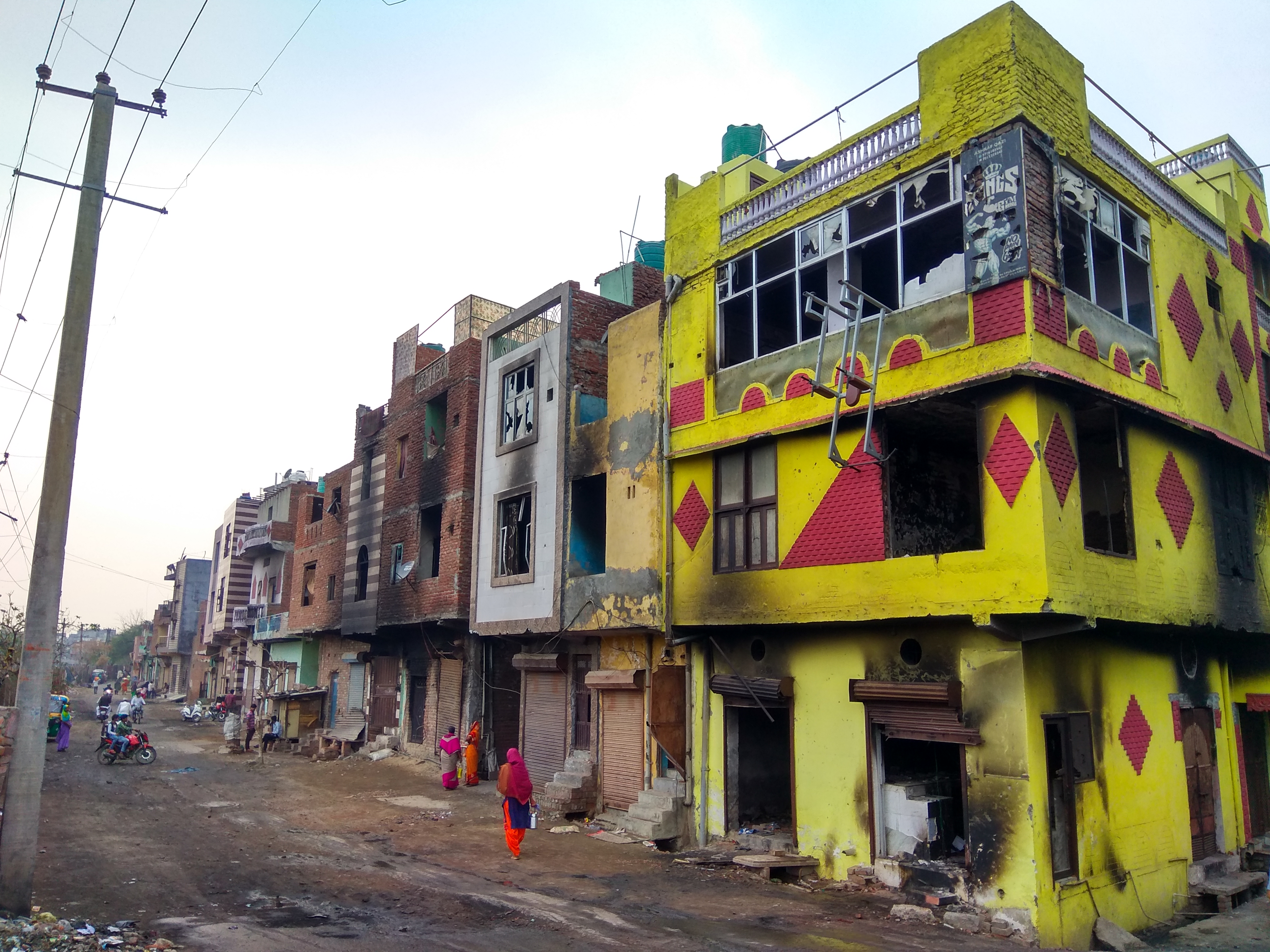
Muslim homes and businesses burned during the North East Delhi riots in 2020.

Communalism and communal violence is a longstanding problem in Indian society, especially between Hindus and Muslims. Scholars have observed that in the Hindu–Muslim communal riots in India, it is invariably Muslims who suffer the greatest losses. Proportionately more Muslims are killed and more Muslim property is destroyed. In 1961, first major riots took place in Jabalpur. In 1964 there were riots in Jamshedpur and Rourkela. Major riots took place in Ranchi, Bihar in 1967 and in Ahmedabad, Gujarat in 1969. In the 1970s and 1980s major communal riots took place. In many of these riots nearly 1,000 Muslims were killed. In 1992–93, riots took place in Bombay in which 50 Muslims perished. From 1992 to 2003 the Muslim community faced a series of communal riots, among which the most serious was the Babri mosque incident.

The 2002 Gujarat riots were a series of incidents starting with the Godhra train burning and the subsequent communal violence between Hindus and Muslims in the Indian state of Gujarat. On 27 February 2002, a Muslim mob burnt the Sabarmati Express train and 58 Hindus including 25 women and 15 children were burnt to death. Frontline claimed that the blame of train burning was put on Muslims, while larger sections of media reported that it was Muslim mob which burnt the train. Attacks against Muslims and general communal riots arose on a large scale across the state, in which 790 Muslims and 254 Hindus were ultimately killed; 223 more people were reported missing. 536 places of worship were damaged: 273 dargahs, 241 mosques and 19 temples. Muslim-owned businesses suffered the bulk of the damage. 6,000 Muslims and 10,000 Hindus fled their homes. Preventive arrests of 17,947 Hindus and 3,616 Muslims were made. In total, 27,901 Hindus and 7,651 Muslims were arrested.

The 2020 Delhi riots, which left more than 53 dead and hundreds injured including both Hindus and Muslims, were triggered by protests against a citizenship law seen by many critics as anti-Muslim and part of Prime Minister Narendra Modi's Hindu nationalist agenda. According to Ashutosh Varshney, the director of the Center for Contemporary South Asia at Brown University, "on the whole, the Delhi riots ... are now beginning to look like a pogrom, à la Gujarat 2002 and Delhi 1984". According to Subir Sinha, a senior lecturer at the SOAS University of London, the north and northeast areas of Delhi were a focus of "highly inflammatory speeches from top BJP ministers and politicians" in the run-up to the Delhi election. Sinha continues that "the pent-up anger of BJP supporters" who lost the election in Delhi, effectively took it out on "the Muslim residents of these relatively poor parts of the city".

According to Thomas Blom Hansen, a Stanford University professor, across India "a lot of the violence perpetrated against Muslims these days is actually perpetrated by subsidiaries of the Hindu nationalist movement". According to Hansen, the police harassment of Muslims in Muslim neighborhoods in the run-up to the Delhi riots is "very well-documented". According to Sumantra Bose, a London School of Economics professor, since Narendra Modi's reelection in May 2019, his government has "moved on to larger-scale, if still localized, state-sanctioned mob violence". In recent years, anti-Muslim violence in India has increased seriously due to the Hindutva ideology, where citizens with other religious beliefs are tolerated but have second‐class status.

==== Philippines ====
The Muslim Moro people live in the Autonomous Region in Muslim Mindanao and the southern provinces, remain disadvantaged in terms of employment, social mobility, education, and housing. Muslims in the Philippines are frequently discriminated against in the media as scapegoats or warmongers. This has established escalating tensions that have contributed to the ongoing conflict between the Philippine government, Christians, and Moro people.

There has been an ongoing exodus of Moro (Tausug, Samal, Islamized Bajau, Illanun, and Maguindanao) to Malaysia (Sabah) and Indonesia (North Kalimantan) for the last 30 to 50 years, due to the annexation of their lands by Christian Filipino militants such as the Ilaga, who were responsible for massacres of Muslim villages from the 1970s to the late 1990s. This has changed the population statistics in both countries to a significant degree, and has caused the gradual displacement of the Moros from their traditional lands.

==== Sri Lanka ====
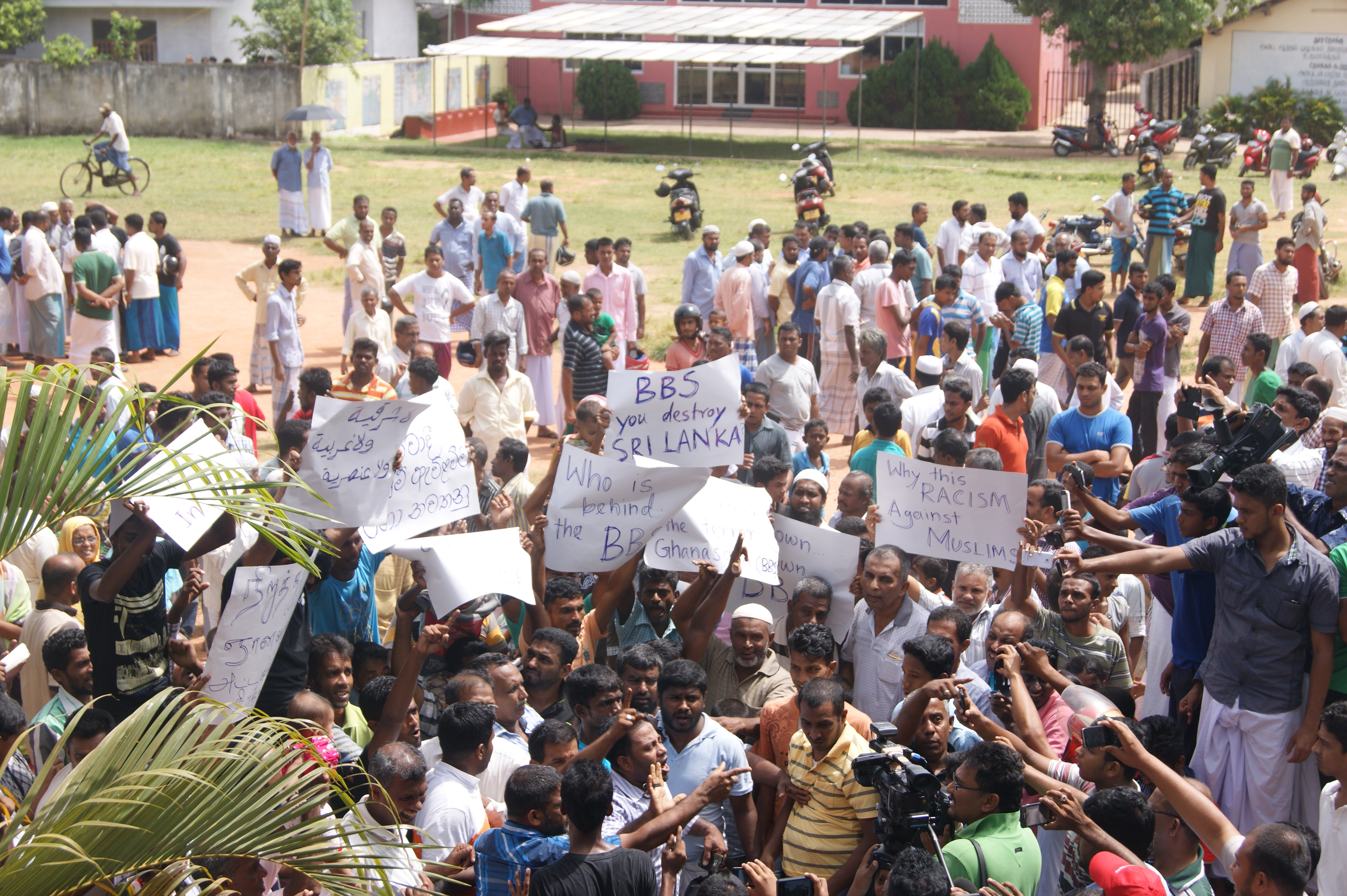
Protesters hold placards as they demonstrate against the anti-Muslim violence in Sri Lanka, 17 June 2014.

===== Persecution by Sinhala-Buddhist nationalists =====
Religious minorities have been subjected to increased persecution and attacks owing to the widespread mono-ethnic Sinhala Buddhist Nationalism in Sri Lanka. A nationalistic Buddhist group, Bodu Bala Sena (BBS), is alleged to have been behind attacks on Mosques and Muslims, as well as having organized a moral unofficial police team to check the activities of Christian missionaries and Muslim influence in daily life. The BBC reported that "Sri Lanka's Muslim minority is being targeted by hardline Buddhists. ... There have also been assaults on churches and Christian pastors but it is the Muslims who are the most concerned." The BBS has received criticism and opposition from other Buddhist clergy and politicians. Mangala Samaraweera, a Sri Lankan Theravada Buddhist politician who has served as Minister of Foreign Affairs since 2015, has accused the BBS of being "a representation of 'Taliban' terrorism" and of spreading extremism and communal hatred against Muslims. Samaraweera has also alleged that the BBS is secretly funded by the Ministry of Defence. Anunayake Bellanwila Wimalaratana, deputy incumbent of Bellanwila Rajamaha Viharaya and President of the Bellanwila Community Development Foundation, has stated that "The views of the Bodu Bala Sena are not the views of the entire Sangha community" and that "We don't use our fists to solve problems, we use our brains". Wataraka Vijitha Thero, a Buddhist monk who condemns violence against Muslims and heavily criticized the BBS and the government, has been attacked and tortured for his stances. Sinhala Buddhist Nationalism is opposed to Sarvodaya, although they share many of the same influences like Dharmapāla's teachings by example, by having a focus upon Sinhalese culture and ethnicity sanctioning the use of violence in defence of dhamma, while Sarvodaya has emphasized the application of Buddhist values in order to transform society and campaigning for peace.

===== Persecution by the LTTE =====
Beginning in July 1990, tensions between the Sri Lankan Muslims (who constitute a separate ethnic group) and the Liberation Tigers of Tamil Eelam arose. Tit-for-tat killings between Tamils and Muslims in the Eastern Province resulted in the massacres of dozens of Muslims there. This culminated in the Kattankudy mosque massacre in August 1990 by the LTTE. Following these massacres, thousands of Muslims fled Tamil-majority areas of the Eastern Province and resettled in Muslim-majority areas.

==== Tajikistan ====
Sunni Islam of the Hanafi school has been officially recognized by the government since 2009. Tajikistan considers itself a secular state with a Constitution providing for freedom of religion. The Government has declared two Islamic holidays, Id Al-Fitr and Idi Qurbon, as State holidays. According to a U.S. State Department release and Pew research group, the population of Tajikistan is 98% Muslim. The 2012 Pew report stated that approximately 87 of identified as Sunni, roughly 3% as Shia and roughly 7% as non-denominational Muslims. The remaining 2% of the population are followers of Russian Orthodoxy, a variety of Protestant denominations, Catholicism, Zoroastrianism, and Buddhism.

A great majority of Muslims fast during Ramadan, although only about one third in the countryside and 10% in the cities observe daily prayer and dietary restrictions.

There is some reported concern among mainstream Muslim leaders that minority religious groups undermine national unity. There is a concern for religious institutions becoming active in the political sphere. The Islamic Renaissance Party (IRP), a major combatant in the 1992–1997 Civil War and then-proponent of the creation of an Islamic state in Tajikistan, constitutes no more than 30% of the government by statute. Numbers of large mosques appropriate for Friday prayers are limited and some feel this is discriminatory.

By law, religious communities must register by the State Committee on Religious Affairs (SCRA) and with local authorities. Registration with the SCRA requires a charter, a list of 10 or more members, and evidence of local government approval prayer site location. Religious groups who do not have a physical structure are not allowed to gather publicly for prayer. Failure to register can result in large fines and closure of place of worship. There are reports that registration on the local level is sometimes difficult to obtain. People under the age of 18 are also barred from public religious practice.

The reason for having Tajikistan in this article is primarily because the government of the country itself, is – or is seen to be – the source of claimed persecution of Muslims. (As opposed to coming from outside forces or other religious groups.) This can make the reported issues open to bias by media and personal religious beliefs or preferences. In fact, the government – with the apparent approval of the people – is attempting to keep the government completely secular (full separation of Church and State) to avoid what they perceive as problems in other surrounding countries.

- The Constitution provides for freedom of religion, and the Government generally respects this right.
- There are some restrictions, and the Government monitors the activities of religious institutions to keep them from becoming overtly political.
- Religious communities must be registered by the Committee on Religious Affairs, which monitors the activities of Muslim groups
- The official reason given to justify registration is to ensure that religious groups act in accordance with the law but in practice it ensures they do not become overly political.
- President Imomali Rahmonov strongly defended "secularism", likely understood both by the President and his audience, as being "antireligious" rather than "nonreligious."
- The vast majority of citizens, including members of the Government, consider themselves Muslims and are not anti-Islamic but there is a pervasive fear of Islamic fundamentalism in both the government and much of the population at large.
- A 1998 law prohibits the creation of political parties with a religious orientation.
- A November 2015 rule reportedly bans Government Employees from attending Friday Prayers.
- The Friday "Government Employee Prayer ban" appears to relate to leaving work during normal working hours to attend prayers. "Over the last two weeks, after Idi Qurbon, our management forbade us from leaving work to attend Friday prayers," one unnamed government employee told Asia-Plus.

Mosques are not permitted to allow women inside due to a fatwa issued in August 2004, by the Tajik Council of Ulema, or scholars – the country's highest Muslim body. Part of the reasoning for this is that Tajikistan has 3,980 mosques, but very few are designed to allow men and women to worship separately, a practice Islam generally requires. The fatwa was not strictly enforced and more recently, it has been reported that the Ulema Council will relax the ban.

Only state controlled religious education is approved for children and long beards are banned in Tajikistan.

In Tajikistan, Mosques are banned from allowing Friday Prayers for children younger than 18 year old.

From the beginning of 2011, 1,500 mosques were shut down by the Tajik government, in addition to banning the hijab for children, banning the use of loudspeakers for the call of prayer, forbidding mosques from allowing women to enter, and monitoring Imams and students learning an Islamic education abroad, having sermons in the Mosque approved by the government and limiting the Mosque sermons to 15 minutes. Muslims experienced the most negative effects from the "Religion Law" enacted by the government of Tajikistan, curtailing sermons by Imams during weddings, making the "Cathedral mosques" the only legal place for sermons to be given by Imams with sermons not being allowed in five-fold mosques, the five-fold mosques are small mosques and serve a limited number of people while the medium and big mosques are categorized as Cathedral mosques, girls who wore the hijab have been expelled from schools and hijabs and beards are not permitted on passport photos. Mosques have been demolished and shut down by the Tajikistan government on the justification that they were not registered and therefore not considered as mosques by the government.

Tajikistan has targeted religious groups like Jehovah's Witnesses, Jews, Christians, and Muslims who try to evade control by the government, synagogue, churches, and Mosques have been shut down and destroyed, only a certain amount of mosques are allowed to operate and the state must approve all "religious activity", in which younger than 18-year-old children are not allowed to join in. Buildings for religious worship for Jehovah's Witnesses, Protestant Churches, the Jewish Synagogue, and Muslim mosques have been targeted, destroyed, and shut down and prayers are forbidden to take place in public halls, with severed restrictions placed on religion. Churches, a synagogue, and mosques have been destroyed by the Tajikistan government.

Government approval is required for Tajiks seeking to engage in religious studies in foreign countries and religious activities of Muslims in particular are subjected to controls by the Tajikistan government. State control has been implemented on Islamic madrasahs, Imams, and Mosques by Tajikistan. A list of sermon "topics" for Imams has been created by the Tajikistan government. Towns are only allowed to have a certain number of mosques and only religious buildings sanctioned by the government are allowed to host religious activities, schools have banned hijab, religious studies in private have been forbidden mosque religious services are not allowed to admit children and non-registered mosques have been closed. Religious matters are banned for children under 18 year old. Public buildings do not allow beards, schools ban hijabs, unregistered mosques are shut down, and sermons are subjected to government authority. Only if "provided the child expresses a desire to learn" can a family teach religion to their own children, while the Tajik government banned all non-family private education. Islam and Muslims have been subjected to controls by the Tajikistan government, the states decides what sermons the Imams give, the government discharges the salaries of Imams and there is only a single madrasah in Tajikistan.

Jehovah's Witnesses have been declared illegal in Tajikistan. Abundant Life Christian Centre, Ehyo Protestant Church, and Jehovah's witnesses have accused Tajikistan of lying about them not being declared illegal at a Warsaw OSCE conference for human rights.

Among increasingly religious Tajiks, Islamic-Arabic names have become more popular over Tajik names. However the government has considered the outlawing of Arabic-Islamic names for children. Tajikistan President Rakhmon (Rahmon) has said that the Persian epic Shahnameh should be used as a source for names, with his proposed law hinting that Muslim names would be forbidden after his anti-hijab and anti-beard laws.

The Tajik government has used the word "prostitute" to label hijab wearing women and enforced shaving of beards. As well as that the black coloured Islamic veil was attacked and criticized in public by Tajik President Emomali Rahmon.

The Islamic Renaissance Party of Tajikistan has been banned by the Tajik government.

Tajikistan's restrictions on Islam has resulted in a drastic decrease of big beards and hijabs. Tajikistan bans Salafism under the name "Wahhabi", which is applied to forms of Islam not permitted by the government.

160 Islamic clothing stores were shut down and 13,000 men were forcibly shaved by the Tajik police and Arabic names were banned by the parliament of Tajikistan as part of a secularist campaign by President Emomali Rajmon.

Arabic names were outlawed by the legislature of Tajikistan.

In Uzbekistan and Tajikistan women wore veils which covered their entire face and body like the Paranja and faranji. The traditional veil in Central Asia worn before modern times was the faranji but it was banned by the Soviet Communists but the Tajikistan President Emomali has misleadingly tried to claim that veils were not part of Tajik culture.

After an Islamic Renaissance Party member was allowed to visit Iran by the Iranian government a diplomatic protest was made by Tajikistan.

==== Vietnam ====
The Cham Muslims in Vietnam are only recognized as a minority, and not as an indigenous people by the Vietnamese government despite being indigenous to the region. Muslim Chams have experienced violent religious and ethnic persecution and restrictions on practising their faith under the current Vietnamese government, with the Vietnamese state confisticating Cham property and forbidding Cham from observing their religious beliefs. In 2010 and 2013 several incidents occurred in Thành Tín and Phươc Nhơn villages where Cham were murdered by Vietnamese. In 2012, Vietnamese police in Chau Giang village stormed into a Cham Mosque, stole the electric generator, and also raped Cham girls. Cham Muslims in the Mekong Delta have also been economically marginalized and pushed into poverty by Vietnamese policies, with ethnic Vietnamese Kinh settling on majority Cham land with state support, and religious practices of minorities have been targeted for elimination by the Vietnamese government.

=== Europe ===
==== Bosnia and Herzegovina ====
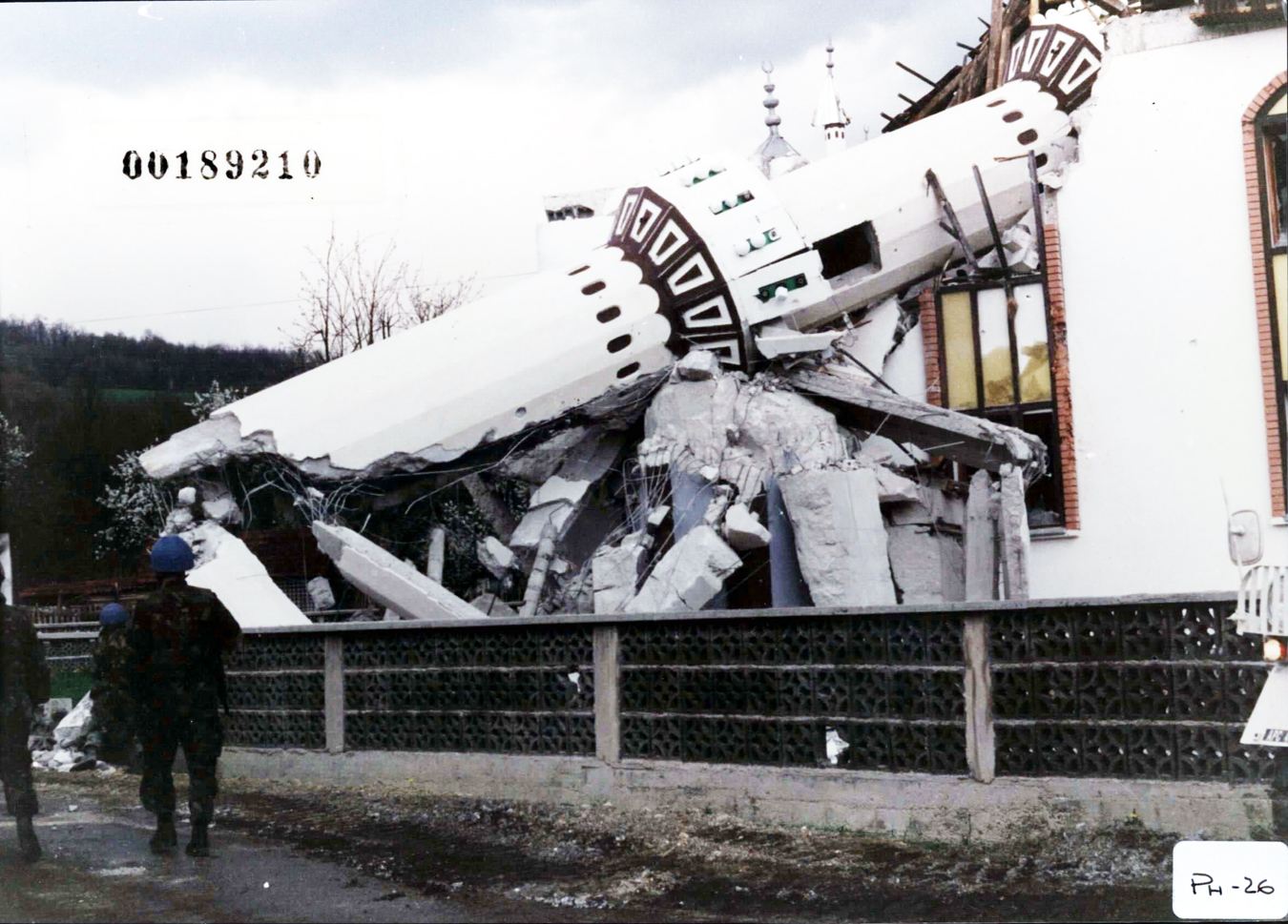
A mosque demolished by the Croatian Defence Council in Ahmići, April 1993

The majority of persecutions that have been reported were during the Bosnian War. Primarily, the actions taken by all three factions has led to the Bosnian genocide, which refers to either the genocidal actions that took place at Srebrenica and Žepa which were committed by the Army of Republika Srpska in 1995, or the broader ethnic cleansing campaign throughout certain areas that were controlled by Republika Srpska during the 1992–1995 Bosnian War.

The events in Srebrenica in 1995 included the complete cleansing of more than 8,000 Bosniak men and boys, as well as the mass expulsion of another 25,000–30,000 Bosniak civilians, in and around the town of Srebrenica in Bosnia and Herzegovina, committed by units of the Army of the Republika Srpska (VRS) under the command of General Ratko Mladić.

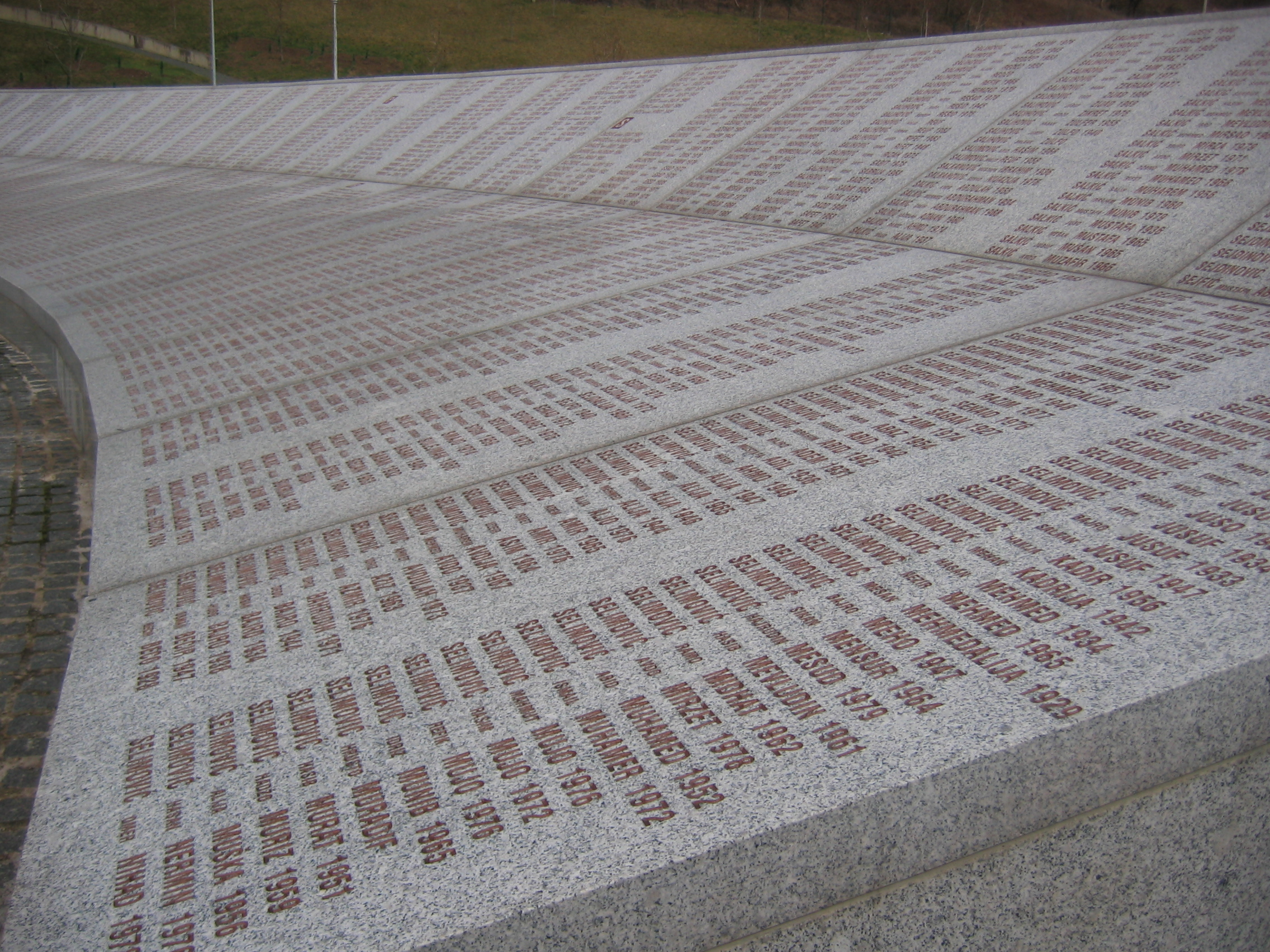
Wall of names at the Srebrenica Genocide Memorial

The ethnic cleansing campaign that took place throughout areas controlled by the VRS targeted Bosnian Muslims. The ethnic cleansing campaign included unlawful confinement, murder, rape, sexual assault, torture, beating, robbery, and inhumane treatment of civilians; the targeting of political leaders, intellectuals, and professionals; the unlawful deportation and transfer of civilians; the unlawful shelling of civilians; the unlawful appropriation and plunder of real and personal property; the destruction of homes and businesses; and the destruction of places of worship.

The Srebrenica massacre, also known as the Srebrenica genocide (Bosnian: Genocid u Srebrenici), was the July 1995 killing of more than 8,000 Bosniaks (Bosnian Muslims), mainly men and boys, in and around the town of Srebrenica during the Bosnian War. The killing was perpetrated by units of the Army of Republika Srpska (VRS) under the command of General Ratko Mladić. The Secretary-General of the United Nations described the mass murder as the worst crime on European soil since the Second World War. A paramilitary unit from Serbia known as the Scorpions, officially part of the Serbian Interior Ministry until 1991, participated in the massacre, along with several hundred Russian and Greek volunteers.

==== Bulgaria ====
In 1989, 310,000 Turks left Bulgaria, many of them left under pressure as a result of the communist dictator Todor Zhivkov regime's assimilation campaign (though up to a third of them returned before the end of the year). That program, which began in 1984, forced all Turks and all other Muslims who lived in Bulgaria to adopt Bulgarian names and renounce all Muslim customs. The motivation behind the 1984 assimilation campaign is unclear; however, some experts believe that the disproportionately high birth rate of the Turks and the lower birth rate of the Bulgarians were major factors. During the name-changing phase of the campaign, Turkish towns and villages were surrounded by army units. Citizens were issued new identity cards with Bulgarian names. Failure to present a new card meant forfeiture of salary, pension payments, and bank withdrawals. Birth or marriage certificates would only be issued in Bulgarian names. Traditional Turkish costumes were banned; homes were searched and all signs of Turkish identity were removed. Mosques were closed. According to contemporary estimates, 500 to 1,500 people were killed when they resisted assimilation measures, and thousands of others were imprisoned, sent to labour camps or forcibly resettled.

==== France ====
In the week after the Islamist terrorist attack against Charlie Hebdo which made 23 casualties, 54 anti-Muslim incidents were reported in France. These included 21 reports of actions (shootings with non-lethal weapons such as bb gun and dummy grenades) against Islamic buildings (e.g. mosques) and 33 cases of threats and insults. Three grenades were thrown at a mosque in Le Mans, west of Paris, and a bullet hole was found in its windows. A Muslim prayer hall in the Port-la-Nouvelle was also fired at. There was an explosion at a restaurant affiliated to a mosque in Villefranche-sur-Saône. No casualties were reported. Seven days after the attack, Mohamed El Makouli was stabbed to death at home by 28-year-old neighbour Thomas Gambet shouting "I am your God, I am your Islam." His wife, Nadia, suffered hand injuries while she tried to save him.

Between 24 and 28 December 2015, a Muslim prayer hall was burned down and Qur'ans were set alight following marches by Corsican nationalists in a series of protests in Corsica. The protesters claimed to be acting in revenge for an incident that occurred the day prior when firefighters and police were assaulted in the neighbourhood of Jardins de l'Empereur; however, outside observers labeled the ensuing riots as anti-Arab and anti-Muslim. The Corsican nationalist politicians have claimed their view does not legitimise xenophobia, blaming the protest on French nationalism instead. Scholarly opinions on this claim are divided.

==== Germany ====
On 28 May 1993, four neo-Nazi skinheads (ages 16–23) set fire to the house of a Muslim Turk family in Solingen in North Rhine-Westphalia. As a result of the attack 3 girls and 2 women died and 14 other family members, including several children, were injured, some of them severely.

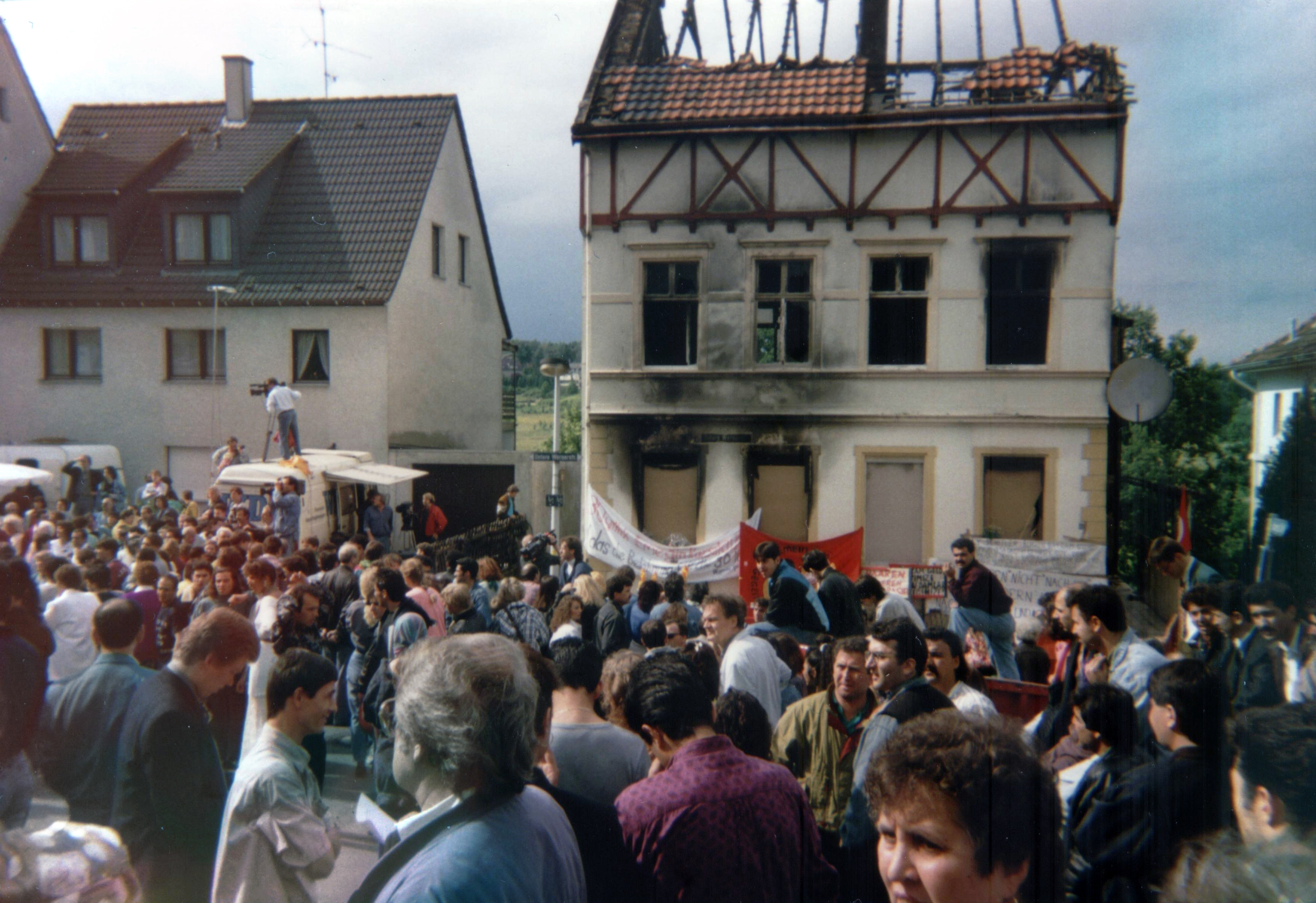
Common demonstration of Germans and Turks at the site of the Solingen arson attack of 1993

On 9 June 2004 a nail bombing in a business area popular with Turkish immigrants in Cologne injured 22 Turks, completely destroyed a barber shop and many other shops and seriously damaged numerous parked cars.

On 1 July 2009, Marwa El-Sherbini was stabbed to death in a courtroom in Dresden, Germany. She had just given evidence against her attacker who had used insults against her because she wore an Islamic headscarf. El-Sherbini was called "Islamist", "terrorist", and (according to one report) "slut". (Note: The police report stated that Wiens called El-Sherbini Terroristin, Islamistin, and Schlampe. (Der Spiegel, 31 August 2009, p. 65).)

The National Socialist Underground murders took place between 2000 and 2006. The Neo-Nazi group killed 10 people. The police discovered a hit list of 88 people that included "two prominent members of the Bundestag and representatives of Turkish and Islamic groups".

German officials recorded more than 70 attacks against mosques from 2012 to 2014. In 2016, 91 mosques in Germany were attacked. Police stated that the majority of cases have gone unsolved, and only one arrest was made so far. There were 950 attacks reportedly on Muslims and mosques in Germany in 2017 injuring 34 Muslims. In 2018, police recorded 813 hate crimes against Muslims, injuring at least 54 Muslims. 132 Islamophobic incidents occurred in Germany in the first half of 2019, injuring 4 Muslims.

On 17 July 2018, a man fired six shots at a female employee wearing a headscarf in a Turkish-owned bakery, leaving no casualties.

==== Netherlands ====
According to research by Ineke van der Valk, an author and researcher at the University of Amsterdam, a third of mosques in the Netherlands have experienced at least one incident of vandalism, threatening letters, attempted arson, or other aggressive actions in the past 10 years.

==== Norway ====
On 22 July 2011, two sequential lone wolf domestic terrorist attacks by Anders Behring Breivik against the government, the civilian population, and a Workers' Youth League (AUF) summer camp killed 77 people and injured at least 319. Analysts described him as having Islamophobic views and a hatred of Islam, and as someone who considered himself as a knight dedicated to stemming the tide of Muslim immigration into Europe. In a manifesto, he describes opposition to what he saw as the Islamisation of Europe as his motive for carrying out the attacks.

On 10 August 2019 21 year old lone gunman Philip Manshaus opened fire on a mosque in Bærum, Norway, a suburbia 20 kilometers outside of Oslo. He injured one person and was then subdued by two worshippers. At the time of the shooting there were three congregants in the mosque.

==== Sweden ====
Two people died and 13 were injured in a series of shootings targeting people with dark skin and non-Swedish appearance in Malmö in 2009 and 2010. The perpetrator had "strong anti-immigrant sentiments" and all but one of the victims were not ethnically Swedish.

Between 25 December 2014 and 1 January 2015, three arson attack against mosques occurred across Sweden in Eslöv, Uppsala and Eskilstuna injuring at least five Muslim civilians.

On 22 October 2015, a masked swordsman killed three and wounded another at Kronan School in Trollhättan. The perpetrator chose the school as his target due to its high immigrant population. He was later shot and killed by police. It is the deadliest attack on a school in Swedish history.

==== Switzerland ====
Zürich Islamic center shooting was a mass shooting of several people in an Islamic center in Central Zürich that occurred on 19 December 2016. Three people were wounded in the attack, two seriously, though all are expected to survive.

In 2019, one in every two Muslims in Switzerland stated that they had been discriminated against based on their religious identity.

==== United Kingdom ====
In 2015, 46% of Muslims in United Kingdom stated that they think being Muslim in U.K. is difficult.

In 2016, 1,223 cases of Islamophobic attacks were reported to Tell MAMA.

After the Manchester Arena bombing in May 2017, there was a 700% rise in the number of reported hate crimes against Muslims in the U.K. 94,098 hate crimes were recorded in the country in 2017–2018, 52% of them targeted Muslims which is about 130 to 140 hate crimes against Muslims reported each day. Scotland Yard stated that such crimes were "hugely underreported". According to Tell MAMA, between March and July 2017, 110 attacks targeting mosques occurred in United Kingdom.

Boris Johnson's comments on women wearing the veil in August 2018 led to a surge in anti-Muslim attacks and incidents of abuse. In the week following Johnson's comments, Tell MAMA said anti-Muslim incidents increased from eight incidents the previous week, to 38 in the following which equals an increase of 375%. Twenty-two of the recorded anti-Muslim hate crimes targeted women who wore the niqab, or face veil.

In 2019, there were 3,530 recorded cases of Islamophobic hate crime in UK. A week after the March 2019 Christchurch mosque shootings in New Zealand, the number of reported hate crimes against Muslims increased by 593% and 95 incidents were reported to The Guardian between 15 March (day of the Christchurch mosque shootings) and midnight on 21 March.

In April 2025, up to 100 graves, including those of Muslim children and babies, were vandalised in a Muslim section of the Carpenders Park Lawn cemetery in Watford, United Kingdom. Apparently, grave markers had been uprooted and scattered across the grass. Police are investigating the incident as an Islamophobic hate crime and have appealed for witnesses and further information from the public. Brent Council, which owns the cemetery, has promised to reinstate the damaged name plaques once the police investigation is complete. The Muslim community has been profoundly shocked by the desecration, with Saqib Nadeem, president of the Ahmadiyya Muslim Association Watford, describing the vandalism as "heartbreaking."

=== North America ===
==== Canada ====
Police forces from across Canada have reported that Muslims are the second most targeted religious group, after Jews. And while hate crimes against all religious groups (except Jews) have decreased, hate crimes against Muslims have increased following 9/11. In 2014, police forces recorded 99 religiously motivated hate crimes against Muslims in Canada, the number was 45 in 2012.

In 2015, the city of Toronto reported a similar trend: hate crimes in general decreased by 8.2%, but hate crimes against Muslims had increased. Police hypothesized the spike could be due to the Paris attacks or anger over refugees. Muslims faced the third highest level of hate crimes in Toronto, after Jews and the LGBTQ community.

On 29 January 2017, a mass shooting occurred at the Islamic Cultural Centre of Quebec City, killing 6 and injuring 19 Muslims. Prime Minister Justin Trudeau and Premier Philippe Couillard called the shooting a terrorist attack, but the perpetrator was not charged with terrorism. The incident was classified as a hate crime and an Islamophobic attack.

In June 2021, five members of a Muslim family were the victims of a domestic terrorist attack in the city of London, Ontario. Four members died as a result of this attack, leaving the fifth, a 9-year-old boy, with severe injuries. The act was reported as premeditated and motivated by anti-Muslim hate.

==== United States ====
In the aftermath of 9/11, the number of hate crimes against people of Middle-Eastern descent in the country increased from 354 attacks in 2000 to 1,501 attacks in 2001.

Zohreh Assemi, an Iranian American Muslim owner of a nail salon in Locust Valley, New York, was robbed, beaten, and called a "terrorist" in September 2007 in what authorities call a bias crime. Assemi was kicked, sliced with a boxcutter, and had her hand smashed with a hammer. The perpetrators, who forcibly removed $2,000 from the salon and scrawled anti-Muslim slurs on the mirrors, also told Assemi to "get out of town" and that her kind were not "welcomed" in the area. The attack followed two weeks of phone calls in which she was called a "terrorist" and told to "get out of town", friends and family said.

On 25 August 2010, a New York taxi driver was stabbed after a passenger asked him whether he was a Muslim.

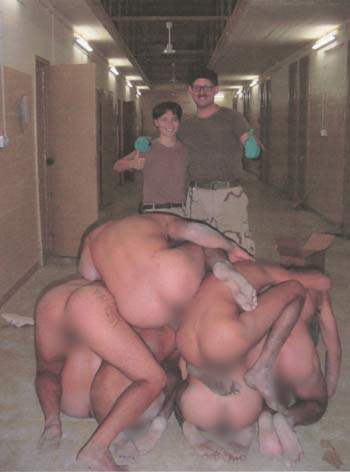
Abu Ghraib torture and prisoner abuse

On 27 December 2012, in New York City 31-year-old Erika Menendez allegedly pushed an Indian immigrant and small businessman named Sunando Sen onto the subway tracks where he was struck and killed by a train. Menendez, who has a long history of mental illness and violence, told police: "I pushed a Muslim off the train tracks because I hate Hindus and Muslims... Ever since 2001 when they put down the Twin Towers, I've been beating them up." She was charged with second-degree murder as a hate crime and was sentenced to 24 years imprisonment in 2015.

The American Civil Liberties Union (ACLU) keeps track of Nationwide Anti-Mosque Activity where they have noted at least 50 anti-mosque incidents in the previous five years.

In 2017, a Tennessee man harassed two Muslim girls after they got off a school bus. He yelled at the girls "Go back to your country!". The man injured the father of the girls by assaulting him and swinging a knife. The man also chased the mother while still holding the knife. When he was taken into custody, he called the family "terrorists" and vowed to kill them when released from jail. Acting U.S. Attorney Mary Jane Stewart said of the attack, "The cowardly and unprovoked attack and display of hate-filled aggression by this defendant toward two innocent young girls and their father is despicable. An attack upon the free exercise of any person's religious beliefs is an attack on that person's civil rights. The Department of Justice will continue to vigorously prosecute such violent acts motivated by hate.

In 2020, it was reported that Muslim detainees at a federal immigration facility in Miami, Florida, were repeatedly served pork or pork-based products against their religious beliefs, according to claims made by immigrant advocates. The Muslim detainees at the Krome detention facility in Miami were forced to eat pork because religiously compliant/halal meals that ICE served had been consistently rotten and expired. In one instance, the Chaplain at Krome allegedly dismissed pleas from Muslim detainees for help, saying, "It is what it is." Civil rights groups said many had suffered illness, like stomach pains, vomiting, and diarrhea, as a result. An ICE spokesman said, "Any claim that ICE denies reasonable and equitable opportunity for persons to observe their religious dietary practices is false." Previously in 2019, a Pakistani-born man with a valid US work permit was reportedly given nothing but pork sandwiches for six consecutive days.

===== Wrongful detentions =====
In the aftermath of the September 11 attacks, Arabs and Muslims complained of increased scrutiny and racial profiling at airports. In a poll conducted by the Boston Globe, 71 percent of Blacks and 57 percent of Whites believed that "Arabs and Arab-Americans should undergo special, more intensive security checks before boarding airplanes." Some Muslims and Arabs have complained of being held without explanation and subjected to hours of questioning and arrest without cause. Such cases have led to lawsuits being filed by the ACLU. Fox News radio host Mike Gallagher suggested that airports have a "Muslims Only" line in the wake of the 9/11 attacks stating "It's time to have a Muslims check-point line in America's airports and have Muslims be scrutinized. You better believe it, it's time." In Queens, New York, Muslims and Arabs have complained that the NYPD is unfairly targeting Muslim communities in raids tied to the alleged Zazi terror plot.

===== Criticism of the war on terror =====
The war on terror has been labelled a war against Islam by ex-United States Attorney General Ramsey Clark, who said that "Most of the politicians are putting it as Islamic terrorists but what they really mean is the threat of Islam. So the idea of the war on Islam is the idea of extermination of a proportion never seen in history at any time."

There is no widely agreed on figure for the number of people that have been killed so far in the War on Terror as it has been defined by the Bush Administration to include the war in Afghanistan, the war in Iraq, and operations elsewhere. The International Physicians for the Prevention of Nuclear War, and the Physicians for Social Responsibility and Physicians for Global Survival give total estimates ranging from 1.3 million to 2 million casualties. Another study from 2018 by Brown University's Watson Institute for International and Public Affairs puts the total number of casualties of the War on Terror in Iraq, Afghanistan, and Pakistan between 480,000 and 507,000. A 2019 Brown University study places the number of direct deaths caused by the War on Terror at over 800,000 when Syria and Yemen are included, with the toll rising to 3.1 million or more once indirect deaths are taken into account.

=== Oceania ===
==== New Zealand ====
The Christchurch mosque shootings were two consecutive white supremacist terrorist attacks which were committed at the Al Noor Mosque and the Linwood Islamic Centre in Christchurch, New Zealand, during Friday prayers on 15 March 2019. The attacks killed 51 people and injured 40 others.

== By other Muslim groups ==
Persecution of Muslims by other Muslims includes Persecution of minority Muslim groups, Anti-Shi'ism, Anti-Sunnism, Persecution of Ahmadis, Persecution of Hazara people, Persecution of Kashmiri Shias, and Persecution of Sufis.

== See also ==
- Destruction of early Islamic heritage sites in Saudi Arabia
- Islamophobia
- Islamophobic trope
- Freedom of religion
- Religious discrimination
- Religious fanaticism
- Religious intolerance
- Religious persecution
- Religious segregation
- Religious terrorism
- Religious violence
- Religious war
- Sectarianism
- Sectarian violence
- State religion

== Sources ==
- Millar, James R. (2004). Encyclopedia of Russian History Volume 2: A–D (PDF). New York: Macmillan Reference. ISBN 978-0-02-865907-7. Archived from the original (PDF) on 29 April 2017.
- Mizelle, Peter Christopher (May 2002). "Battle with Famine:" Soviet Relief and the Tatar Republic 1921–1922. University of Virginia.
