= Freedom of Religion Act =

Freedom of Religion Act may refer to:

- US Religious Freedom Restoration Act of 1993
- US American Indian Religious Freedom Act of 1978
- Freedom of religion in India#Madhya Pradesh Freedom of Religion Act of 1968
- Freedom of religion in India#Orissa Freedom of Religions Act of 1967
- Freedom of religion in India#Arunachal Pradesh Freedom of Religion Act of 1978
- Gujarat Freedom of Religion Act of 2003
- Finland's Freedom of Religion act of 1923 (revised in 2003) - see Religion in Finland#Freedom of religion

== See also ==
- Freedom of religion
- Status of religious freedom by country
- Category:Freedom of religion by country
