= Freedom of religion in India =

Freedom of religion in India is a fundamental right guaranteed by Article 25–28 of the Constitution of India. Modern India came into existence in 1947 and the Indian constitution's preamble was amended in 1976, to explicitly declare India a secular state. Supreme Court of India ruled that India was already a secular state from the time it adopted its constitution, what actually was done through this amendment is to state explicitly what was earlier contained implicitly under article 25 to 28. Every citizen of India has a right to practice and promote their religion peacefully. However, there have been numerous instances of religious intolerance that resulted in riots and mob violences; notably, the 1984 Sikh Massacre in and around Delhi, 1990 Exodus of Kashmiri Hindus from Kashmir, the 1992–93 Bombay Riots in Mumbai, the 2008 Anti-Christian riots in Odisha and other anti-Christian violence in India. Some perpetrators of the 1984 Sikh Massacre have not been brought to justice despite widespread condemnation.

Religion in India (2011 census)
1. Hinduism (79.8%)
2. Islam (14.2%)
3. Christianity (2.30%)
4. Sikhism (1.70%)
5. Buddhism (0.70%)
6. Jainism (0.40%)
7. Others (0.90%)

The Indian subcontinent is the birthplace of four major religions: Jainism, Hinduism, Buddhism and Sikhism. Even though Hindus form 80 percent of the population, India also has religious adherents concentrated in certain places: Jammu and Kashmir has a Muslim majority, Punjab has a Sikh majority; Nagaland, Meghalaya and Mizoram have Christian majorities; states such as Maharashtra, Gujarat, Rajasthan, Madhya Pradesh and Karnataka have significant minorities of Jains; the Himalayan states and territories such as Sikkim, Ladakh and Arunachal, the state of Maharashtra, and the Darjeeling District of West Bengal have significant minorities of Buddhist populations. Islam is the largest minority religion, as Indian Muslims form the third largest Muslim population in the world and account for over 14 percent of the India's population. Other than Hindus and Muslims, India is a diverse country that is home to Sikh, Christian, Buddhists, Jain, Zoroastrian, Indigenous and Irreligious populations.

Rajni Kothari, founder of the Centre for the Study of Developing Societies has written, "India is a country built on the foundations of a civilisation that is fundamentally tolerant."

== History ==
=== Tradition of religious freedom ===
The plural nature of Indian society in the 3rd century BC was encapsulated in an inscription of Ashoka:

King Priyadarshi (Ashoka) dear to the Gods, honours all sects, the ascetics (hermits) or those who dwell at home, he honours them with charity and in other ways. But the King, dear to the Gods, attributes less importance to this charity and these honours than to the vow of seeing the reign of virtues, which constitutes the essential part of them. For all these virtues there is a common source, modesty of speech. That is to say, One must not exalt one's creed discrediting all others, nor must one degrade these others Without legitimate reasons. One must, on the contrary, render to other creeds the honour befitting them.

Emperor Kharvela (born in the family of Rajarshi Vasu) declares himself in his inscription (approximately 2nd century BCE):

sava pasa-nd-a-puujako, sava devaayatan-sanskaarako

I am worshipper of all sects, restorer of all shrines.

Kharvela's self-description must be contrasted with other rulers around the world, who took pride in calling themselves "but-shikan" or "defender of the (only true) faith".

Badayuni in his Muntakhab-ut-Tawáríkh reports that the Mughal Emperor Akbar, who had established the Din-i-Ilahi faith, decreed the following in AH 1000 (1551–1552 CE):

Hindus who, when young, had from pressure become Musalmans, were allowed to go back to the faith of their fathers. No man should be interfered with on account of his religion, and every one should be allowed to change his religion, if he liked. ...People should not be molested, if they wished to build churches and prayer rooms, or idol temples, or fire temples.

The Sikh Gurus built freedom of religion in their faith to such an extent that while being a persecuted minority themselves under many Mughal rulers like Aurangzeb, Sikhs felt obliged to fight for the religious freedom of others. The sixth Guru of Sikhs, Guru Hargobind, even had a mosque built for his Muslim disciples, instead of putting them under any pressure to adopt the Sikh faith. The tradition of religious freedom continued under Sikh Empire, and other Sikh Principalities where Sikh rulers commissioned several Gurdwaras, Temples and Mosques for their subjects of various faiths.

=== Refuge from religious persecution ===
India, with its traditional tolerance, has served as a refuge for groups that have encountered persecution elsewhere.

- Jews: Jews in India were granted lands and trading rights. The oldest of the three longest-established Jewish communities in India, traders from Judea and Israel arrived in the city of Cochin, in what is now Kerala, 2,500 years ago and are now known as Cochin Jews. According to recordings by Jews, the date of the first arrival is given at 562 BC. In 68 AD, more Jews fled to Kerala to escape attacks by the Romans on Jerusalem..
- Christians: Christianity is believed to have come to India in the 1st century through Saint Thomas who formed the Saint Thomas Christians in Kerala. Later in the 15th and 16th centuries European Missionaries brought in Christianity in places such as Goa and Mangalore. Protestant Missionaries came in 18th and 19th centuries to North-East India.
- Parsi: The Zoroastrians from Greater Persia arrived in India fleeing from religious persecution in their native land in the 9th century. They flourished in India and in 18–19th centuries intervened on behalf of their co-religionists still in Greater Persia. They have produced India's pioneering industrialist house of Tata and one of the only two Indian Field Marshals in Sam Manekshaw.
- Tibetan Buddhists: Apart from sheltering Tibetan Buddhist refugees who fled their country after it was occupied by China in 1959, India is now home to the Dalai Lama, a high lama of the Gelug school of Tibetan Buddhism.
- Baháʼí: As of 2011, India had world's largest Baháʼí population of 4,572 Baháʼís, who took refuge in India from religious persecution in Iran.

=== Conversion history ===
After the advent of Islam, when religious bias against the non-Islamic sects began to get severe, Hinduism began to take on a distinctive identity. During the 16th century, Sikhism also arose and drew into its fold a number of people in Punjab. Christianity has a history that traces back to the advent of Saint Thomas the Apostle in India around 48 AD. He is said to have been followed by Bartholomew around 55 AD. It is reported that when Vasco Da Gama visited Calicut in 1498 AD, he found over 2 lakh Christians in the Kerala area. The British Government in the beginning discouraged any missionary work; however, in 1837, it permitted entry of white missionaries in its territory because of the pressure from the evangelical lobby in the British parliament.

Religious conversion has sparked a lot of attention and has caused hostilities in Indian families. Though conversion resolved the pre-conversion crisis, it resulted in more troubles in the convert's life. Different kinds of hostilities were: being killed, threatened with death, fear of future troubles or being disowned by parents and friends.

=== BJP government ===
In 2019, Human Rights Watch stated that dozens of vigilante killings against religious minorities in India have gone unpunished due to inertia or collusion, mostly in BJP-run states.

In 2020, the United States Commission on International Religious Freedom (USCIRF) stated the BJP government under Prime minister Narendra Modi "allowed violence against minorities and their houses of worship to continue with impunity and also engaged in and tolerated hate speech and incitement to violence". The commission recommended India be labeled a "country of particular concern" which is the lowest of categories on the basis of religious freedom. In 2023, the USCIRF again recommended the US Department of State to designate India as a “country of particular concern” for the fourth year in a row. According to the commission, the Indian government “at the national, state and local levels promoted and enforced religiously discriminatory policies” that included “laws targeting religious conversion, interfaith relationships, the wearing of hijabs and cow slaughter, which negatively impact Muslims, Christians, Sikhs, Dalits and Adivasis (indigenous peoples and scheduled tribes)”.

On 21 June 2022, Rep. Ilhan Omar (D-MN) introduced a resolution (H.Res.1196) to condemn human rights violations and violations of international religious freedom in India, including those targeting Muslims, Christians, Sikhs, Dalits, Adivasis, and other religious and cultural minorities. The resolution calls on the U.S. Secretary of State to designate India as a Country of Particular Concern under the International Religious Freedom Act, which has been recommended by the independent, bipartisan USCIRF for the past three years.

In February 2023, Justice For All, a Chicago-based human rights organization released a report titled 'The Nazification of India' which draws one on one parallels between Nazi Germany and India under the BJP-RSS regime. The report alleges that BJP-RSS are establishing the ideology of Hindu supremacy called “Hindutva" which draws inspiration from Nazism and has led to the persecution of religious minorities including Muslims, Christians, Dalits and Sikhs. The report, however, focuses on Indian Muslims, who are the prime target.

== Laws and Indian Constitution ==
The Preamble of the Indian Constitution has the word "secular", and articles 25 to 28 implying that the State will not discriminate, patronise or meddle in the profession of any religion. However, it shields individual religions or groups by adding religious rights as fundamental rights. Article 25 says "all persons are equally entitled to freedom of conscience and the right to freely profess, practice, and propagate religion subject to public order, morality and health". Further, Article 26 says that all denominations can manage their own affairs in matters of religion. All these rights are subject to be regulated by the State.

Article 25 (2b) uses the term "Hindus" for all classes and sections of Hindus, Jains, Buddhists and Sikhs. Sikhs and Buddhists objected to this wording that makes many Hindu personal laws applicable to them. However, the same article also guarantees the right of members of the Sikh faith to bear a Kirpan. Religions require no registration. The government can ban a religious organisation if it disrupts communal harmony, has been involved in terrorism or sedition, or has violated the Foreign Contributions Act. The government limits the entry of any foreign religious institution or missionary and since the 1960s, no new foreign missionaries have been accepted though long term established ones may renew their visas. Many sections of the law prohibit hate speech and provide penalties for writings, illustrations, or speech that insult a particular community or religion.

Some major religious holidays like Diwali (Hindu), Christmas (Christian), Eid (Muslim) and Guru Nanak's birth anniversary (Sikh) are considered national holidays. Private schools offering religious instruction are permitted while government schools are non-religious.

The government has set up the Ministry of Minority Affairs, the National Human Rights Commission (NHRC) and the National Commission for Minorities (NCM) to investigate religious discrimination and to make recommendations for redressal to the local authorities. Though they do not have any power, local and central authorities generally follow them. These organisations have investigated numerous instances of religious tension including the implementation of "anti-conversion" bills in numerous states, the 2002 Gujarat violence against Muslims and the 2008 attacks against Christians in Orissa.

For Shia Muslims, the Grand Ashura Procession In Kashmir where they mourn the martyrdom of Husayn ibn Ali has been banned by the Government of Jammu and Kashmir from the 1990s. People taking part in it are detained, and injured by Jammu and Kashmir Police every year. According to the government, this restriction was placed due to security reasons. Local religious authorities and separatist groups condemned this action and said it is a violation of their fundamental religious rights.

=== Post-independence state laws ===
The Article 25 of the Indian Constitution is a basic human right guarantee (see Articles 18 and 19 of the Universal Declaration of Human Rights) that cannot be subverted or misinterpreted in any manner. Anti-conversion laws are promulgated on the premise that forced or induced conversions happen and need to be prevented.

A consolidation of various anti-conversion or so-called "Freedom of Religion" Laws has been done by the All Indian Christian Council. Several Indian states passed Freedom of Religion Bills primarily to prevent people from converting to Christianity. Orissa was the first state to bring such law named as 'Orissa Freedom of Religion Act, 1967'. It was followed by Madhya Pradesh in 1968 and Arunachal Pradesh in 1978. Christians protested against this saying that propagation of their faith was an important part of Christianity. Both laws enacted by the Orissa and Madhya Pradesh high courts were challenged stating Article 25 of the Constitution. The Supreme Court supported the laws saying, "What is freedom for one is freedom for the other in equal measure and there can, therefore, be no such thing as a fundamental right to convert any person to one's own religion".

Chhattisgarh in 2000 and Gujarat State in 2003 passed anti-conversion laws that prohibit forced or money induced conversions. In July 2006, the Madhya Pradesh government passed legislation requiring people who desire to convert to a different religion to provide the government with one month's notice, or face fines and penalties. In August 2006, the Chhattisgarh State Assembly passed similar legislation requiring anyone who desires to convert to another religion to give 30 days' notice to, and seek permission from, the district magistrate. In February 2007, Himachal Pradesh became the first Congress Party-ruled state to adopt legislation banning illegal religious conversions. It was followed by Rajasthan in 2008, but it has still not become an act. So total there are 10 states where freedom of religion bill has become an act- Odisha, Madhya Pradesh, Arunachal Pradesh, Chhattisgarh, Gujarat, Haryana, Himachal Pradesh, Uttarakhand, Uttar Pradesh and Jharkhand.

In 2013, the Bharatiya Janata Party general secretary Venkaiah Naidu has declared that his party would bring anti-conversion laws nationwide if his party is elected to power in 2014. However, as of January 2018, the party does not yet have a majority in the Upper House of the Parliament. The president of party Amit Shah has challenged the opposition parties to support it in enacting such a law. The US State Department has said that the recent wave of anti-conversion laws in various Indian states passed by some states is seen as gradual rise in Hindutva.

=== Madhya Pradesh Freedom of Religion Act of 1968 ===
The Niyogi Committee (1954) set up by the Congress government in Madhya Pradesh alleged that Christian missionaries were creating 'a state within a state' and observed that the 'philanthropic activities of Christian missionaries are a mask for proselytization.' Missionary work was also opposed by the Sangh Parivar. The Madhya Pradesh Assembly rejected the Freedom of Religion Bills of 1958 and 1963. However, this bill was passed in 1968 as 'The Freedom of Religion Act.' The Madhya Pradesh 'Freedom of Religion Act' requires that a convert produce a legal affidavit that s/he was not under any pressure, force, or allurement to convert but was converting by own will and desire after evaluating the religion properly. Also according to this law, anyone who writes or speaks or sings of 'divine displeasure' (with an intention to induce forced conversion by means of threat) can be imprisoned for a period of up to two years and fined up to five thousand rupees.

=== Orissa Freedom of Religions Act of 1967 ===
The Orissa Freedom of Religions Act of 1967 states that "no person shall convert or attempt to convert either directly or otherwise any person from one religious faith to another by the use of force or by inducement or by any fraudulent means nor shall any person abet any such conversion". Contravention of this law was punishable with imprisonment of up to one year and/or a fine of up to Rs 5,000. In the case of a minor, a woman, or a person belonging to a Scheduled Caste or Tribe, the punishment was up to two years of imprisonment and the limit of the fine raised to Rs. 10,000. The Orissa High Court, however, struck down the Act as ultra vires of the Constitution on the ground that the state legislature did not have the right to legislate matters of religion. The same year, the state of Madhya Pradesh also enacted the Madhya Pradesh Freedom of Religion Act as seen above. However, the Madhya Pradesh High Court, in contrary to the Orissa High Court, negated the challenge of some Christians that the Act violated their fundamental right as provided under Article 25 of the Constitution. The decisions of both the Courts were challenged before the Supreme Court. The Supreme Court upheld the decision of the Madhya Pradesh High Court and reversed the decision of the Orissa High Court.

=== Arunachal Pradesh Freedom of Religion Act of 1978 ===
The Arunachal Pradesh government enacted this Act to protect the tribals of Arunachal Pradesh from forced conversions of any kind. It reads:

3) Prohibition of forcible conversion. No person shall convert or attempt to convert, either directly or otherwise any person from indigenous faith by use of force or by inducement or any fraudulent means nor shall any person abet any such conversion. 4) Punishment of Contravention of the Provision of Section. Any person contravening the provisions contained in Section 2, shall without prejudice to any civil liability, be punishable with imprisonment to the extent of two (2) years and fine up to ten thousand (10, 000) rupees. (i) whoever converts any person from his indigenous faith to any other faith or religion either by himself performing the ceremony for such conversion as a religious priest or by taking part directly in such ceremony shall, within such period after the ceremony as may be prescribed, send an intimation to the Deputy Commissioner of the District to which the person converted belongs, of the fact of such conversion in such forms as may be prescribed.

=== Tamil Nadu Prohibition of Forcible Conversion of Religion Bill 2002 ===
The Tamil Nadu Prohibition of Forcible Conversion of Religion Bill 2002 stated that 'No person shall convert or attempt to convert directly or otherwise any person from one religion to another either by use of force or by allurement or by any fraudulent means.' However, soon after the defeat of the Bharatiya Janata Party-led coalition in the 2004 elections, the Tamil Nadu Government led by Jayalalitha repealed the law in June.

=== Gujarat Freedom of Religion Act 2003 ===
The Gujarat Assembly passed the Freedom of Religion Act in March 2003. It was called the Dharam Swatantrata Vidheya (Freedom of Religion Act). Narendra Modi, the Chief Minister of the State, called the Act as one of the main achievements of his government's one year in office. The law prohibited conversion by force or inducement.

=== Himachal Pradesh Freedom of Religion Act 2006 ===
Himachal Pradesh Freedom of Religion Act 2006 is a bill unanimously passed by the Legislature of Himachal Pradesh state in India on 19 December 2006. According to Chief minister Virbhadra Singh, "The Bill was intended to prevent forcible conversions. Conversions created resentment among several sections of the society and also inflame religious passions leading to communal clashes," he said. He claimed the Bill was meant to prevent exploitation of the depressed classes. On 20 February 2007, Governor Vishnu Sadashiv Kokje gave his assent to the Himachal Pradesh Freedom of Religion Bill 2006.

=== Jharkhand Freedom of Religion Act, 2017 ===
Jharkhand passed an anti-conversion law in 2017.

Uttarakhand Freedom of Religion Act, 2018

Uttarakhand passed an anti-conversion law in 2018.

=== Karnataka ===
On 15 Oct, 2021, the CM of Karnataka, Mr Basavaraj Bommai ordered a survey into "unauthorised" Christian missionaries, in a bid to introduce an anti-conversion law in Karnataka state.

On 23 December 2021, the Basavaraj Bommai ministry approved and passed the Karnataka Protection of Right to Freedom of Religion Act, 2021 in the Karnataka Legislative Assembly.

The Haryana Prevention of Unlawful Conversion of Religion Bill-2022

The Haryana State Assembly passed the Haryana Prevention of Unlawful Conversion of Religion Bill, 2022, against religious conversion by allurement, coercion or fraudulent means.

== 2020s ==
According to a Pew Research report from 2021, across India, 84% said that to be “truly Indian” it is very important to respect all religions. However, in the same report, 64% of the Hindu population said it being Hindu is important for a "truly Indian" identity. In a Freedom House report from 2022, the country was scored 2 out of 4 for religious freedom, a score that remained unchanged in their 2026 report.
