= Hindutva boycott of Hindi cinema =

Opposition to apparent Muslim influence in Bollywood

In recent years in India, several boycotts have been organized by advocates of Hindutva against Hindi-language films. Some of the boycotters are using the pejorative neologism "Urduwood" to characterise the Hindi-language Bollywood film industry as a Muslim-dominated, anti-Hindu industry, which would favour Urdu language over Hindi.

== History ==
Bollywood has historically had many Muslims involved in the production of its movies, with some of the most popular film stars being Muslim, especially the Khans of Bollywood and many of the lyricists and songwriters infusing Urdu into the scripts; Urdu, which is heavily influenced by Middle Eastern languages such as Persian and Arabic, is generally associated with Muslims (see Hindi-Urdu controversy). Allegations about Bollywood portraying Hindus and Hinduism in negative light in the name of secularism in films like PK (2014) have emerged following the victory of the Hindu nationalist Bharatiya Janata Party in 2014.

== Names ==
Along with "Urduwood", related terms that are used are "Khanwood" (referring to the prominence in Bollywood of actors with the common South Asian Muslim last name Khan), "Jihadwood", and "Dawood-wood".

== Boycotts ==
Accusations of Bollywood films hurting Hindu sentiments have prompted calls for boycotts against several major films in recent years, using the hashtag #BoycottBollywood; However, some boycotts also happen to be politically motivated, as in the case of Chhapaak (2020), a film about an acid-attack survivor which received calls of boycott due to the lead actress Deepika Padukone expressing support to SFI member & JNUSU head Aishe Ghosh after she was physically assaulted by male ABVP cadres at JNU during Citizenship Amendment Act protests. Bollywood producers have said that the threat of boycotts has led them to avoid portrayal of certain topics in their films like interfaith romances involving Muslims (viewed negatively by Hindu nationalists). In addition, there have been more recent films which cater to Hindutva propaganda. However, some films like Pathaan (2023) have been able to succeed regardless of the boycotts, and there seems to have been an overall limited impact on boycotted movies' revenues.

Some boycotters have called for South Indian cinema to be promoted instead, claiming that it was more respectful in representing Hindu culture, however some South Indian films like Annapoorani: The Goddess of Food (2023) and L2: Empuraan (2025) were also boycotted by them.

== See also ==
=== Events ===
- 2020 Bengaluru drug raids, controversy in Kannada cinema
- Death of Sushant Singh Rajput, controversial 2020 suicide of a Bollywood actor which increased the boycotts
- "Besharam Rang", 2023 Bollywood song involved in boycott controversy

=== Film topics ===
- List of films banned in India
- Muslim social, an early Bollywood film genre
- Puranic, an Indian film genre

=== Religious and linguistic topics ===
- Sanskritisation (language), a linguistic change favoured by Hindu nationalists
- Hindi–Urdu controversy
