= Hadiya case =

2017–2018 Indian Supreme Court case

Shafin Jahan v. Ashokan K.M
- Court: Supreme Court of India
- Full case name: Shafin Jahan v. Asokan K.M & ORS

Case history
- Appealed from: High Court of Kerala
- Appealed to: Supreme Court of India

Court membership
- Judges sitting: Justice Dipak Misra; Justice Ajay Manikrao Khanwilkar; Justice Dhananjaya Y. Chandrachud

Case opinions
- Hadiya was allowed to re-join her medical college to continue her studies and her marriage with Shafin Jahan was restored.

The Hadiya case (Shafin Jahan v. Ashokan K.M) was a 2017–2018 Indian Supreme Court case that affirmed the validity of the marriage of Hadiya (formerly Akhila Ashokan) and Shafin Jehan, which was challenged by Hadiya's family. Media outlets have described the underlying dispute as an allegation of "love jihad" conspiracy theory.

At the time of the case, Hadiya was a homeopathic medical student from Vaikom, Kerala. In early 2016, she was reported missing by her father, Asokan K.M, who filed a police case followed by a habeas corpus petition in the Kerala High Court to trace her; Hadiya has described the circumstances of her leaving as her father forbidding her from practicing Islam. She left her home for college on 6 January 2016, dressed in a hijab. Hadiya was staying with A.S. Zainaba, president of Popular Front of India (PFI)'s women's wing, the National Women's Front (NWF). She had converted to Islam and married Jehan, a Muslim man. Jehan was an active member of the PFI-affiliated Social Democratic Party of India (SDPI). Her family alleged that she was brainwashed and that her marriage was forced, but Hadiya said she married of her own volition.

In May 2017, Hadiya's marriage was annulled by the High Court of Kerala on the grounds that Hadiya was a victim of indoctrination and psychological kidnapping, and that Hadiya's and her husband's claims of their marriage being arranged through a matrimony website were "bogus". The High Court of Kerala then handed over Hadiya's custody to her father, Ashokan, arguing that "As per Indian tradition, the custody of an unmarried daughter is with the parents, until she is properly married."

Jahan appealed the Kerala High Court order, and the case moved to the Supreme Court. In November 2017, the Supreme Court of India directed Hadiya to resume her internship, and indicated that she was free to meet whomever she wanted. In March 2018, the Supreme Court restored Hadiya's marriage, 10 months after the Kerala High Court annulled it. After winning the case, she divorced her husband and was briefly reported as missing, but was found remarried.

== Stakeholders ==
Key organisations and people involved and mentioned in Hadiya's High Court and Supreme Court cases are as follows.

- People
  - Hadiya (Akhila Ashokan): A student of homeopathy. Hadiya said she converted to Islam of her own will, then married Shafin Jahan of her own will, and wanted to return to her husband. Hadiya claimed she was tortured by Siva Sakthi Yoga Centre workers, who tried to convert her back to Hinduism, who were directed to her by her father. Hadiya also claimed she had been illegally incarcerated by her father for 11 months.
  - A.S. Zainaba: Hadiya chose to live with Zainaba after she left her home. Zainaba is a member of PFI, and SDFI; and the President of PFI's women's wing National Women's Front.
  - Shafin Jehan: Jehan married Hadiya before their marriage was annulled by the Kerala High Court. He filed the case in Supreme Court to appeal the decision. He is a member of SDPI and PFI. NIA claims Shafin has 4 criminal cases lodged against him, but the SP Kerala Police says there's only one case related to campus politics, which had to do with him being an admin of a WhatsApp group.
  - Ashokan K. M.: Akhila's father, an atheist and ex-serviceman, who went to the Kerala High Court claiming that his daughter Hadiya's marriage was based on forced conversion and her safety was at risk. His daughter, Hadiya, has accused Ashokan of holding her in "unlawful custody" for 11 months, of forbidding her from practicing the faith of her choice, and of trying to keep her from the man she chose as her husband.
- Hindu Organizations
  - Siva Sakthi Yoga Centre: a Hindu centre that visited Hadiya upon Ashokan's request, and whom Hadiya alleges "tortured" her and tried to re-convert her. There have been numerous other allegations of torture at the hands of Siva Sakthi Yoga Centre, where Hindu women are forced by their families to go and reconvert to Hinduism.
- Islamic organisation
  - Popular Front of India (PFI): An Islamic fundamentalist organisation. According to the NIA, the PFI and its partner Islamic state Al-Hindi have plans to launch terrorist actions in India. Shafin Jehan and Zainaba are PFI members.
  - National Women's Front (NWF): The PFI's women's wing headed by Zainaba.
  - Social Democratic Party of India (SDPI): Another wing of the PFI. Shafin Jehan and Zainaba are SDPI members.
  - Sathya Sarani: An Islamic Charitable Trust.
- Government organisations
  - High Court of Kerala (HCK): Annulled Hadiya's marriage held under suspicious circumstances.
  - Supreme Court of India (SC): Currently hearing the ongoing case filed by Safin Jehan to gain access to Hadiya.
  - National Investigation Agency NIA: India's premier national agency that investigates terrorism cases, was asked by the SC to investigate if there has been large scale systematic forced conversions to Islam with the view to carry out terrorist activities. The NIA told the Supreme Court that Hadiya was "a victim of indoctrination and psychological kidnapping", said that Hadiya's claims that her marriage was arranged through a matrimony website were totally false, and that her handlers who arranged her marriage were only looking for active members of the PFI as her groom. NIA had recommended to the Supreme Court and government to ban PFI as it runs terror camps and makes bomb, with plans to carry out terror attacks against India with the help of Islamic state Al-Hindi.

== Religious conversion ==
Hadiya, who grew up as Akhila Ashokan, was born to a family from Vaikom, Kottayam, as the only child of an atheist ex-serviceman, K.M. Ashokan and his wife Ponnamma. She lived with her parents and studied at local schools until 12th standard, which she passed at the second attempt. While pursuing her bachelor's degree at Sivaraj Homeopathic Medical College at Salem, she converted to Islamic faith. She became interested in Islam after seeing two of her collegemates, Faseena and Jaseela. On 6 January 2016 Akhila went missing from a house in Selam, where she was staying with her friends, Faseena and Jaseena, and her parents filed a police complaint against the friends and their father Aboobacker. Hadiya insisted in the High Court that her conversion was a personal choice, her family argued that she was the victim of love jihad. The court annulled her marriage with the observation that she was a "weak and vulnerable girl capable of being exploited". The High Court also said in its order that "Shefin Jahan is one such person who has been assigned to play the role of going through a sham of a marriage with Ms. Akhila, with the object of transporting her out of India." She told the court that she was "impressed" by her friends' "timely prayers and good character." She told the court she had been practicing Islam for 3 years without formally announcing the change of faith, but that she started the legal procedure for conversion only by September 2015. Her parents learnt about the conversion when she refused to participate in her grandfather's funeral ritual at her home. She subsequently returned to college wearing a headscarf.

In January 2016, Akhila left her home and joined a course on Islam at "Therbiathul Islam Sabha", a Kozhikode Islamic study centre, as an 'external candidate' after filling an affidavit that she converted on her own accord. She planned to stay at her roommates' residence in Kerala during the study period. However, her roommates' father Aboobacker refused to let her continue at his residence, following which she approached Satya Sarani, an educational institution and conversion centre at Manjeri, Malappuram. While at Satya Sarani, she stayed with A.S. Zainaba, president of NWF and member of its parent radical Islamist organisation PFI as well as member of the PFI's political wing, the SDPI. The NWF is the women's wing of the PFI. The PFI, having links with banned Islamist terrorist organisation group SIMI and Pakistan's ISI, is involved with Islamic terrorist acts and groups.

Meanwhile, Hadiya's father had filed a missing person's police case, and after being unable to trace her, he filed the first case in the high court.

== High Court lawsuit ==
In February 2016, Akhila's father Ashokan filed a missing person's case at the local police station. Following the case, Aboobacker was arrested by the police. Despite police involvement, Akhila could not be traced, meanwhile Akhila was in contact with the "Sathya Sarani" organisation which placed Zainaba in charge of Akhila. During this period, she changed her name to Hadiya. At the High Court of Kerala, Hadiya's father filed a habeas corpus petition alleging that Satya Sarani was involved in "forced and illegal" religious conversions. Hadiya testified that she was staying with Zainaba of her own free will. The court dismissed Ashokan's petition and let Hadiya continue learning Islam and live with Zainaba, observing that she was not in illegal confinement.

Following this, Ashokan filed a second petition in August 2016, alleging that Hadiya was likely to be transported out of the country after marriage to a Muslim man. The High Court passed an interim order to keep Hadiya under surveillance to ensure that she was not taken outside of India. While she was under surveillance, the police found that she had moved from Zainaba's house to an undisclosed location. Though Hadiya denied planning to travel abroad, the court directed her to stay at a women's hostel in Kochi. In September, the court let her live with Zainaba again, when she testified that she did not possess a passport, and plead that she was being lodged in the hostel "for no fault of hers". On 19 December, the court directed Hadiya to move to the college hostel in Salem to complete her studies. Her father, Ashokan, was asked to produce her certificates on 21 December so that she could resume her studies.

== Marriage ==
On 21 December 2016, Akhila appeared before the High Court accompanied by "a stranger." Close to a year after she had left home and formally converted, she appeared in court with a man named Shafin Jahan, who she said she had married. Shafin Jehan is an active member of SDPI and allegedly also a member of the radical Islamic outfit PFI, with 4 criminal cases against him. The SDPI is the political front of the Islamic fundamentalist organisation PFI. Hadiya married Shafin Jehan on 19 December 2016, the same day she had appeared before the court. The marriage was officiated under Muslim law. Hadiya's lawyer later informed the High Court that she had signed up on a Muslim matrimony website, and that Shafin's proposal came through the site. In May 2017, the High Court annulled Hadiya's marriage with Shefin, and sent her to her parents’ house in Vaikom.

Although the court order was to only provide her police protection, she was not permitted by her father to leave her home or meet anyone, an allegation denied by her father as she was fully surrounded by police inside and outside the house. According to Ashokan, Hadiya refused to leave the house despite allowed to. The chairperson of the State Women's commission and several activists were prevented from meeting Hadiya, and seven people were arrested for trespassing while attempting to meet Hadiya. However, the chairperson of National Commission for Women visited her and noted that she was "happy and smiling", "her health and security are good", and that Hadiya did not report any atrocities or harm done to her.

== At Supreme Court ==
Hadiya's husband, Shafin Jehan approached the Supreme Court in order to challenge the High Court order. At the Supreme Court, Hadiya expressed her will to continue practicing Islam, live with her husband and complete her internship. She claimed that she was unlawfully kept at her parents' home and demanded freedom. The NIA, which investigates terror cases, was asked by the court to investigate if there were organised groups attempting to recruit Hindu women as terrorists by getting Muslim men to convert and marry them. The NIA submitted to the Supreme Court that Hadiya's was an example of "psychological kidnapping", that there was evidence of nearly 90 similar cases of indoctrination and radicalisation in Kerala, and that the court should not accept her statement. Evidence adduced by the NIA showed that claims that Hadiya met Safin Jehan through matrimony website 'waytonikah.com' was "totally false and entirely bogus". The NIA further alleged that the only condition of the handlers who arranged their marriage was that the groom should be an active worker of the PFI, a radical outfit. The judges were livid with what had happened and questioned why the court had been kept in the dark regarding the marriage. The court raised several doubts about the hurried nature of the marriage, and doubted the manner in which the wedding ceremony was conducted.

The Supreme Court allowed Hadiya to return to Salem and pursue her internship. Further hearing in this case, including the decision on the annulment of marriage would be considered by the court in January 2018. Hadiya reported that she was happy with the Supreme Court's decision allowing her to continue her education.

On 23 January 2018, the Supreme court continued hearing the Hadiya Marriage case.

"When the Counsel for Mr Ashokan (Hadiya's father) argued that the circumstances leading to the marriage must be investigated, the court emphasised that Hadiya's marital status could not be looked into by the Court. Being a 24-year old adult, Hadiya had the power to make her own decisions, and the Court could not compel her to go to her father or husband against her will. Neither could the Court look into the character of the person Hadiya had married. The bench reiterated that investigating the marriage in such a manner would set a bad legal precedent. Hadiya has now been made a party to the proceedings as per the request of Mr Kapil Sibal. She can now file her own response."

This was seen positive development as earlier Supreme Court was criticised for not adding Hadiya as a party and denying an adult woman agency in an important matter like marriage choice. The matter has been listed to be next heard on 22 February 2018.

On 8 March 2018, Hadiya's marriage was restored by the Supreme Court.

Hadiya later divorced and remarried. In December 2023, her father reported her missing, but the case was closed several days later when it emerged that she was residing with her new husband.

== NIA Investigation ==
According to the ongoing probe by the NIA, Shafin Jahan is accused of having alleged connections with two ISIS members Manseed and P Safvan, accused in the Omar-al-Hindi case, through Facebook group Popular Front of India (PFI) which allegedly deals with activities of the SDPI. Muneer, Shafin Jahan's friend, brought Hadiya and him together.

The probe by the investigation agency has also revealed certain discrepancies in the couple's earlier claim about meeting on a matrimonial site. According to sources, Shafin had registered his name on the website on 19 September 2015, while Zainaba registered the name of Hadiya and her own daughter, Fathima Thesni, on 17 April 2016. Hadiya viewed 49 profiles between 17 April and 23 April, but not that of Shafin. In the same way, Jahan viewed 67 profiles, but not Hadiya's. As per NIA's report in the "love jihad" case, the marriage proposal of Shafin Jahan had come through Muneer during August 2016.

The NIA ended the probe saying that they could not find any evidence of love jihad in the 11 marriages it investigated.
