= National Women's Front =

Banned Indian women's rights organization

National Women's Front (NWF)
- Abbreviation: NWF
- Formation: 2009
- Type: Islamic activist and women’s rights organization
- Headquarters: 5/3274A, Bank Road, Calicut-673001
- Location: India
- President: Lubna Menhaz Shaik
- General Secretary: Noushira Mohammed
- Parent organisation: Popular Front of India
- Website: nwfindia.com//

The National Women's Front (NWF) is the women's wing of the Popular Front of India, an organization which has been banned for a period of five years by the Government of India under the Unlawful Activities (Prevention) Act since 28 September, 2022.

== Programs and campaigns ==
An event focusing on women's safety was organized by the National Women's Front at the India Islamic Cultural Center in New Delhi in 2013. In said event, a participant claimed that the main reason behind the December 2012 Nirbhaya Rape Case was alcohol, and that to prevent further violence, further campaigns against alcohol consumption should be enacted.

In September of the same year, the National Women's Front organized the national campaign "Right to Hijab" across the country to create awareness about hijab and also promote the right to cultural identity.

In 2014, the NWF Delhi State unit held an International Women's Day celebration with their nationwide campaign "Women Representation – The Power to Empower".

In November of the same year, the NWF organized a conference ‘Awakening’ to debate issues concerning Indian women at Coimbatore. On the eve of the conference, an expo on women's rights and issues was inaugurated by Popular Front of India state president A.S. Ismail. Graphic illustrations of domestic violence, rape, sex-selective abortion and riot victims were presented at the expo.

The Kerala State committee of the National Women's Front organized a campaign against the Uniform Civil Code, as a part of national effort claiming that the Code posed a threat to the cultural diversity of India. During the campaign, the Uniform Civil Code was deemed "anti-national", with the accusation that the code would eliminate cultural diversity and subvert Indian Nationalism. According to the committee, the Uniform Civil Code was a manifestation of anti-Muslim tendencies of Hindutva groups.

The NWF conducts anti-dowry campaign across the nation based on that it conducted during the Mohalla program in 2012.

== Controversy ==
In late 2017, videos from a sting operation of NWF president Zainaba AS showed that she admitted on camera that the NWF was carrying out mass conversion to Islam at Sathya Sarini. Zainaba had earlier been questioned by NIA for her role in conversion of Hadiya/Akhila, which was also termed a case of Love Jihad. Zainaba retracted her recorded statement and claimed that the allegations were false. Following the sting operation, NIA questioned her for her involvement in the mass conversion.
