= Tara Shahdeo Case =

2014 Indian legal case involving forced conversion

The Tara Shahdeo case was a landmark legal investigation and trial in Jharkhand, India, concerning allegations of marriage fraud, domestic violence, and forced religious conversion. The case centered on National-level sport shooter Tara Shahdeo and her 2014 marriage to Raqibul Hasan (using a falsified name Ranjeet Singh Kohli). After a nine-year investigation by the Central Bureau of Investigation (CBI), the case concluded in 2023 with several high-profile convictions.

== Background ==
Tara Shahdeo is a competitive rifle shooter who won a gold medal at the Eastern Zone Shooting Championship in 2009. In July 2014, she married Raqibul Hasan, who had introduced himself to her family as a Hindu businessman named Ranjeet Singh Kohli. The wedding was solemnized through Hindu rituals in Ranchi.

== Allegations and Investigation ==
Shortly after the marriage, Shahdeo alleged that she discovered that he was actually a Muslim man and his name was Raqibul Hasan and not Ranjeet Singh Kohli, and she was kept in confinement, tortured and pressured to convert to Islam. She filed a First Information Report (FIR) in August 2014 after escaping the household. The case gained national prominence as a high-profile example of what is colloquially termed "Love Jihad" in Indian political discourse.

Due to the accused having links with judicial officers and several influential persons in the administration, the state government ordered the investigation to be handed over to the Central Bureau of Investigation (CBI).

== Verdict and Sentencing ==
On 30 September 2023, a Special CBI Court in Ranchi found Raqibul Hasan guilty of rape and criminal conspiracy.

- Raqibul Hasan: Sentenced to life imprisonment.
- Mustaq Ahmed (former Jharkhand high court registrar (vigilance)): Sentenced to 15 years for his role in facilitating the marriage under false pretenses.
- Kaushalya Rani (Hasan's mother): Sentenced to 10 years imprisonment.
