= Uttar Pradesh Prohibition of Unlawful Conversion of Religion Act, 2021 =

Anti-conversion law in India

Uttar Pradesh Legislature
- Long title: An Act to provide for prohibition of unlawful conversion from one religion to another by misrepresentation, force, undue influence, coercion, allurement or by any fraudulent means or by marriage and for the matters connected therewith or incidental thereto
- Citation: https://onelawstreet.com/wp-content/uploads/2025/10/3of2021_english.pdf
- Territorial extent: Uttar Pradesh
- Enacted by: Uttar Pradesh State Legislature
- Enacted: 24 November 2020
- Assented to: 28 November 2020 (Ordinance) 4 March 2021 (Act)
- Signed: Anandiben Patel, Governor of Uttar Pradesh
- Introduced by: Government of Uttar Pradesh

Related legislation
- Orissa Freedom of Religion Act, 1967; Arunachal Pradesh Freedom of Religion Act, 1978; Gujarat Freedom of Religion Act, 2003; Himachal Pradesh Freedom of Religion Act 2006; Uttarakhand Freedom of Religion Act, 2018; Madhya Pradesh Freedom of Religion Bill, 2020

Keywords
- Unlawful Conversion, Unlawful inter-faith marriages, Allurement, Convincing for Conversion, Force, Fraudulent, Coercion, Undue Influence, Minor, Religion, Mass Conversion, Religion Convertor
- Status: Amended

The Uttar Pradesh Prohibition of Unlawful Conversion of Religion Act, 2021 (Hindi: उत्तर प्रदेश विधिविरुद्ध धर्म संपरिवर्तन प्रतिषेध अधिनियम, romanized: Uttara Pradēśa Vidhivirudha Dharma Saṁparivartana Pratiśēdha Adhiniyam), referred to as the Love Jihad law by most of the media, is an anti-conversion law enacted by the Government of Uttar Pradesh, India. The Uttar Pradesh state cabinet cleared the Uttar Pradesh Prohibition of Unlawful Conversion of Religion Ordinance, 2020 on 24 November 2020 following which it was approved and signed by state Governor Anandiben Patel on 28 November 2020. Subsequently, the Uttar Pradesh legislature enacted the Act that was assented to by the governor on 4 March 2021 and was published in state gazette on 5 March 2021.

The law makes religious conversion non-bailable with up to 10 years of jail time if undertaken through misinformation, unlawfully, forcefully, allurement or other allegedly fraudulent means. The law also requires that religious conversions for marriage in Uttar Pradesh has to be approved by a district magistrate. The law also encompasses strict action for mass conversion, including cancellation of registration of social organisation involved in mass religious conversion.

The ordinance was passed amid media publicity and heated debate over love jihad. However, the law itself contains no mention of love jihad. The ordinance was passed days after the Yogi Adityanath government launched 'Mission Shakti', a campaign for the safety and security of women in the state.

An amendment to the ordinance was passed in July 2024, strengthening it. There will now be harsher provisions in the anti-conversion laws, such as life in prison. The legislation has changed to specifically for anyone who threaten, attack, marry, promise to marry, plot, or traffic women, minors, or anybody else with the objective of converting them. These acts are now classified as serious crimes. Penalties for such offenses range from 20 years to life in prison.

== Background ==
Prior to India's independence, during the British Raj, Hindu princely states including Kota, Patna, Surguja, Udaipur, and Kalahandi passed laws restricting religious conversions "in an attempt to preserve Hindu religious identity against Muslims."

=== Prior conversion legislation ===
Prior legislation passed in India to check conversion include:

- Before Independence
  - Raigarh State Conversion Act, 1936
  - Surguja State Apostasy Act, 1942
  - Udaipur State Anti-Conversion Act, 1946
- After Independence
  - Orissa Freedom of Religion Act, 1967
  - Madhya Pradesh Freedom of Religion Act, 1968
  - Arunachal Pradesh Freedom of Religion Act, 1978
  - Gujarat Freedom of Religion Act, 2003
  - Himachal Pradesh Freedom of Religion Act, 2006 (Note: In 2007 "the Himachal Pradesh High Court struck down section 4 of the Act and Rules 3 and 5 of the Himachal Pradesh Freedom of Religion Rules 2007, which implement the Act.")
  - Uttarakhand Freedom of Religion Act, 2018

Laws prohibiting conversion have been passed under various governments — Swatantra Party government in Odisha in 1968; Congress Party government in Himachal Pradesh in 2006. The 2020 UP ordinance contains similar grounds as what was mentioned in these laws.

Jurisprudence from High Courts across the country have said that conversion is not a casual matter. In 2014, the Allahabad High Court stated in a judgement that if conversion "is resorted to merely with the object of creating a ground for some claim of right" it would be "a fraud upon the law". The Akhilesh Yadav government in Uttar Pradesh at the time took a similar stand. In the case of Lily Thomas vs Union of India in 2000, the Supreme Court nulled the marriage on the basis that if someone "feigns to have adopted another religion just for some worldly gain or benefit" it was "religious bigotry".

According to human rights bodies such as International Christian Concern and United States Commission on International Religious Freedom (USCIRF) "no individual has been convicted of forced conversions in India" and the "laws have resulted in few arrests".

=== Uttar Pradesh Freedom of Religion Act, 2019 draft ===
In 2019, the Uttar Pradesh State Law Commission under Justice Aditya Nath Mittal had compiled a report on unlawful religious conversion and proposed a draft Uttar Pradesh Freedom of Religion Act, 2019. The long title of the draft bill stated: "to provide freedom of religion by prohibition of conversion from one religion to another by misrepresentation, force, undue influence, coercion, allurement or by any fraudulent means or by marriage and for the matters connected therewith or incidental thereto." The commission stated that the Indian Penal Code is "not sufficient" to prevent conversions.

=== Usage of the term love jihad ===
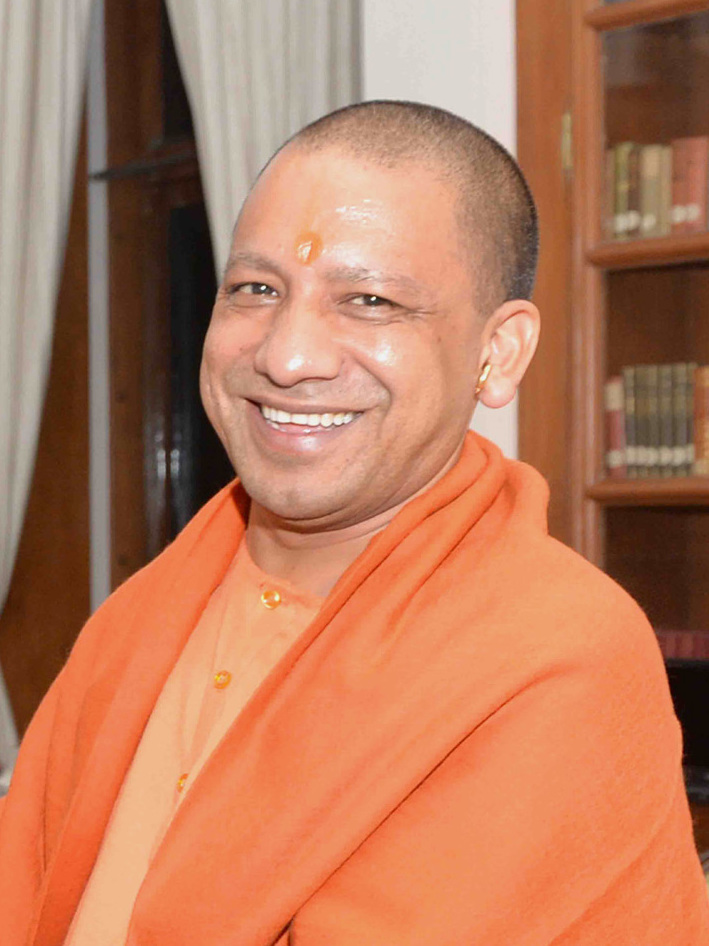
(Left) Chief Minister Adityanath told a gathering on 31 October 2020 that his government will make a law to curb "love jihad". (Right) The law was given assent by Governor Anandiben Patel.

On 31 October, Uttar Pradesh Chief Minister Yogi Adityanath announced that a law to curb 'Love Jihad' (Note: As of November 2020, 'Love jihad' is a term not recognized by the Indian legal system.) would be passed by his government. Following the publication of the draft and assent of the bill, some commentators distanced themselves from attaching the phrase "love jihad" to the bill. While some media reported that the law was related to "love jihad", even calling the ordinance the 'love jihad law' and 'love jihad ordinance'; the law itself contains no mention of love jihad. Days before the ordinance, on 17 October, the Yogi Adityanath government launched 'Mission Shakti', a six-month campaign for the safety and security of women in the state.

=== Allahabad High Court judgement ===
Uttar Pradesh Chief Minister Yogi Adityanath had cited an Allahabad High Court judgement in 2020 as one of the basis for the new law. However, the court later commented on the same judgement, overriding it by saying that it was "not [...] good law".

== Provisions ==
The ordinance defines as:

1. Allurement: means any gift, gratification, easy money or material benefit either in cash or kind, employment, free education in a reputed school run by any religious body, a better lifestyle, divine pleasure, or otherwise.
2. Coercion: forcing someone to do something against their will by employing physical force or psychological coercion that threatens or injures them.
3. Conversion: by renouncing one's own religion and adopting another religion.
4. Fraudulent: means impersonation by false name, surname, of religious symbols.
5. Religion converter: refers to a person of any religion who converts to another, regardless of the title they go by, such as Mulla, Father, Karmkandi, or Maulvi.

The law makes conversion non-bailable with up to 10 years of jail time if undertaken unlawfully, that is if "done through misrepresentation, force, undue influence, coercion, allurement, fraudulent means" or solely for marriage. The ordinance also lays down provisions related to mass conversions. The law requires that religious conversions for marriage in Uttar Pradesh to be approved by a district magistrate. Uttar Pradesh Law Commission says that the proposed law does not include any restriction on interfaith marriage. But experts point out that the vague framing of law makes it easy for the police to interrogate any interfaith marriage and harass Muslim men and interfaith couples.

== Usage ==
A few hours after the ordinance came into effect, the first case was filed. Muskan Jahan, then 3 months pregnant, was the first woman detained under the new ordinance. She was sent to a 'protection home' after her husband was arrested where she suffered a miscarriage allegedly due to negligence by authorities. Both were later released after a court found no evidence of 'love jihad'. In relation to another case being brought before the police, a senior police officer in Shahabad said:

"It is a fact that the two were in love. She knew that he was a Muslim and went to the court to marry him, [...] Now that we received a complaint of forceful conversion, we registered the case and made the arrest. Whether it is justified or not, is for the court to decide. In such cases, the girl's statement is sacrosanct."

The law has empowered Hindu nationalist groups like the Bajrang Dal and used by them to stop interfaith marriages between consenting adults and prosecute them for it. Within 1 month of passing the law, 14 cases were initiated and 51 arrests made. Of these, 13 cases alleged that Hindu women were converted to Islam and in the one case it was alleged that the conversion was to Christianity. In 8 cases, the women gave statements saying that they are a friend or in a relationship with the accused person and in one case, there was a married couple. The onus to prove that the conversions were not forced was placed on the convert and the accused. In only 2 cases, the complaint was made by girls themselves, including one case in Hardoi where a woman was brought by the Bajrang Dal to file a case who claimed that she was enchanted with a tabeez (religious locket).

In another incident, Uttar Pradesh police stopped a Muslim wedding ceremony and detained the couple for a night inside the police station mistaking the bride as a converted Hindu woman on the basis of rumours. An interfaith couple has also fled Uttar Pradesh and sought protection in Delhi High Court from Uttar Pradesh police applying the law against them. In a village in Firozabad, a mob chased the family of an accused in a case where the 'victim' has denied allegations of 'love jihad' while the police is still searching for the accused. There were also reports of Uttar Pradesh police refusing to register cases under the provisions of 'love jihad law' when the complainants were muslim women who converted to Hinduism for marrying Hindu men but were later rejected by their husbands after marriage.

=== First conviction ===
In the first conviction under the Uttar Pradesh Prohibition of Unlawful Conversion of Religion Act, 2021 (Anti-Love Jihad Act), a Muslim youth in the state's Amroha district was given a five-year prison sentence for attempting to marry a Hindu girl under false pretenses by concealing his religion.

== Criticism and support ==
Numerous experts have described the law as unconstitutional including former Law Commission chairman Justice A. P. Shah & former Supreme Court judge Madan Lokur. The criticism is largely focused on denying the right to freedom of religion and restricting women's rights to choose their partner. In December 2020, 104 former bureaucrats have written an open letter to Chief minister Yogi Adityanath asking him to repeal the law. They alleged that UP "has become the epicentre of politics of hate, division and bigotry and the institutions of governance are now steeped in communal poison".

In January 2021, 224 retired judges, civil servants, diplomats, armed forces veterans wrote a letter to the CM in support of the UP law against 'unlawful conversion'.

"The Uttar Pradesh Prohibition of Unlawful Conversion of Religion Ordinance, 2020 applies to everyone belonging to any religion, provides for the regulation of conversion through prescribed declaration and giving notice to authorities for ruling out unlawful conversions based on misrepresentation, force, undue influence, coercion, allurement, fraudulent means, marriages etc. It rightly provides that the marriages done for sole purpose of unlawful conversion can be declared void by the family courts on a petition by any of the two parties in a marriage"

== Supreme Court Challenge ==
In 2020, Citizens for Justice and Peace filed a PIL before the Supreme Court of India challenging the constitutional validity of the Uttar Pradesh Prohibition of Unlawful Conversion of Religion Ordinance, 2020. CJP argues that this law “places a burden on individuals to justify their personal decisions to the State authorities throttling their Right to Life and Personal Liberty, Dignity, Freedom of Conscience and Choice.” Supreme Court is hearing this challenge along with several other matters challenging similar laws from other Indian states.
