= Hindutva iconoclasm =

Destruction of religious centers, art, and artifacts by Hindutva militants

Hindutva iconoclasm is the purposeful targeting and alteration of structures, symbols, or places of worship that are associated with non-Hindu religions, particularly Islam. Mosques and other religious and cultural institutions esteemed by Muslims, who make up 15% of India's population, thought by Hindu nationalists to be in opposition to Hindu values have long been targets of destruction and violence at the hands of followers of the Hindutva political ideology. Attacks of this kind against Muslims have alarmingly risen in recent years, with the number of attacks against members of the Islamic community increasing since 2014. These attacks have ranged from random acts of street violence to the razing of mosques, including an instance in 2020, where in just 48 hours, 14 mosques were burned by Hindu nationalists.

== Historical context and origins ==
First synthesized by Indian politician and political theorist Vinayak Damodar Savarkar in 1922, the Hindu nationalist Hindutva political movement has grown in size, scope, and tendency to commit violence significantly since its inception. Hindutva has drawn comparisons with the ideology of European fascist movements and Revisionist Zionism, and is bound together by the idea of Hindu hegemony across the Indian subcontinent.

With the rise of the Bharatiya Janata Party (BJP), which openly espouses a Hindutva line, adherents of the political ideology have found themselves occupying high government positions in India, including that of prime minister with the election of Narendra Modi. The election of BJP leadership to Indian parliament has resulted in an increase in Hindutva violence and Islamophobic sentiment in India, with Islamic institutions being a particularly potent target.

== Major incidents ==
=== Babri Masjid demolition (1992) ===
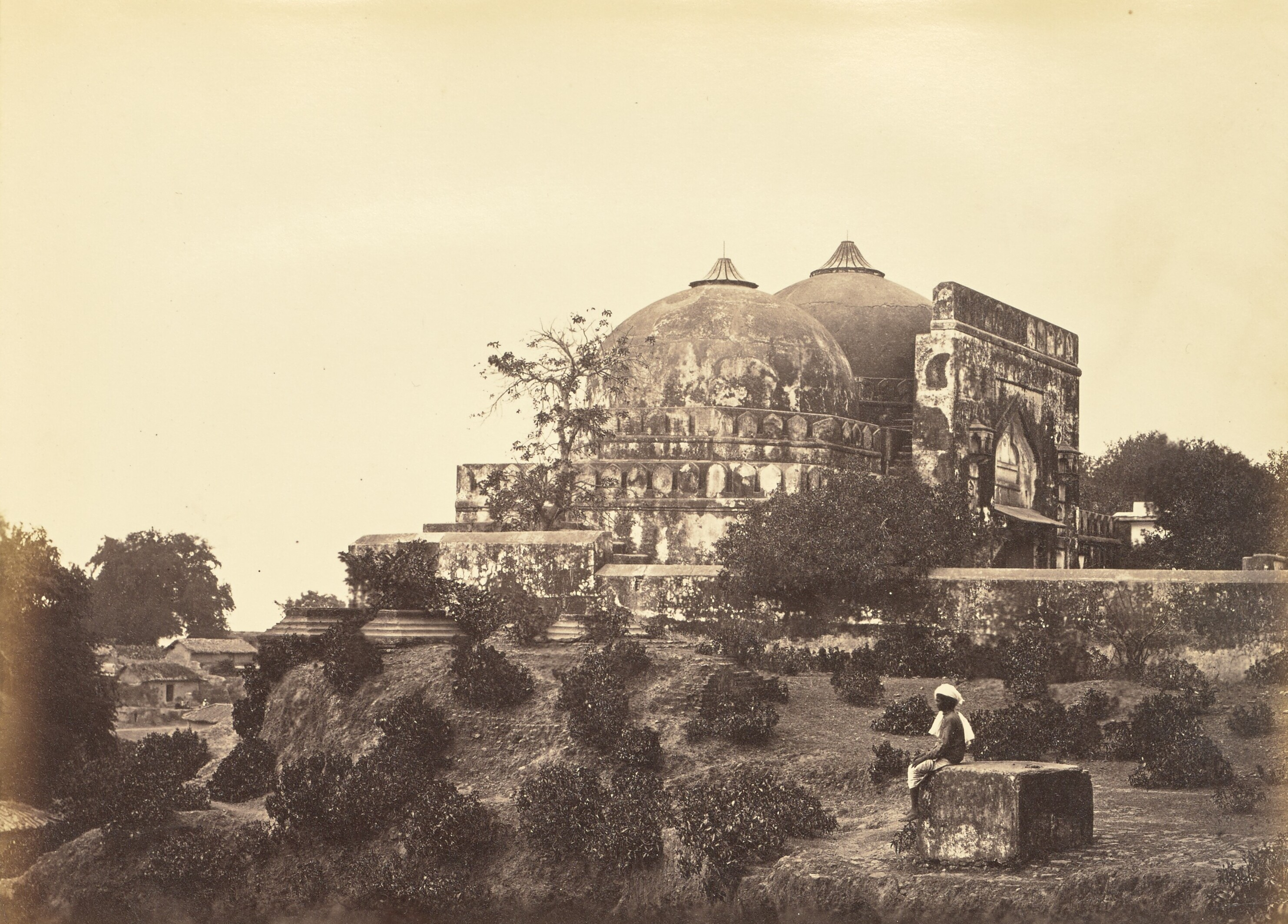
The Babri Masjid, Ayodhya, India, destroyed in 1992 by Hndu nationalists

The Babri Masjid, a mosque located in the town of Ayodhya in northern India, was destroyed by a mob organized by Hindu nationalist politicians in 1992. The mosque is believed by Hindu nationalists to have been built on the birthplace of the Hindu deity Rama, which motivated Hindutva leaders to call for its destruction. In 2019, the Supreme Court of India ruled that the demolition was illegal and transferred control of the land to a government-appointed trust. Construction of a new Hindu temple devoted to Rama, known as the Ram Mandir, began on the same site in August 2020.

=== Gujarat riots (2002) ===
In February 2002, the burning of a train in Godhra, which led to the deaths of 59 Hindu pilgrims, was followed by extensive riots in the state of Gujarat. These riots, which were marked by brutal violence against the Muslim community, included numerous instances of arson and destruction of mosques and Muslim-owned properties. Over 500 mosques and Muslim shrines were attacked, burnt, or completely destroyed. The Gujarat riots resulted in the deaths of over a thousand people, predominantly Muslims, and no legal action was taken against violent participants by the BJP. It has been speculated that Hindu nationalist leaders instigated and supported the violent actions of the mob, which has been denied by both the BJP and the Vishva Hindu Parishad.

=== New Delhi Mosque burning (2020) ===
In February 2020, the northeastern part of New Delhi witnessed severe communal violence between supporters of the BJP and Muslim residents. The clashes resulted in the deaths of over 50 people and extensive property damage, with the majority of the affected properties being Muslim-owned. Within 48 hours, 14 mosques and one Sufi shrine were burnt down. The violence was reportedly triggered by protests against the Citizenship Amendment Act (CAA), which had been criticized for being discriminatory against Muslims.

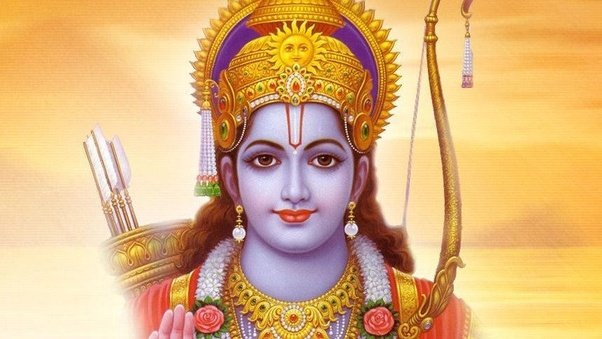
Devotional depiction of Ram with softer features, representing a fair and virtuous king

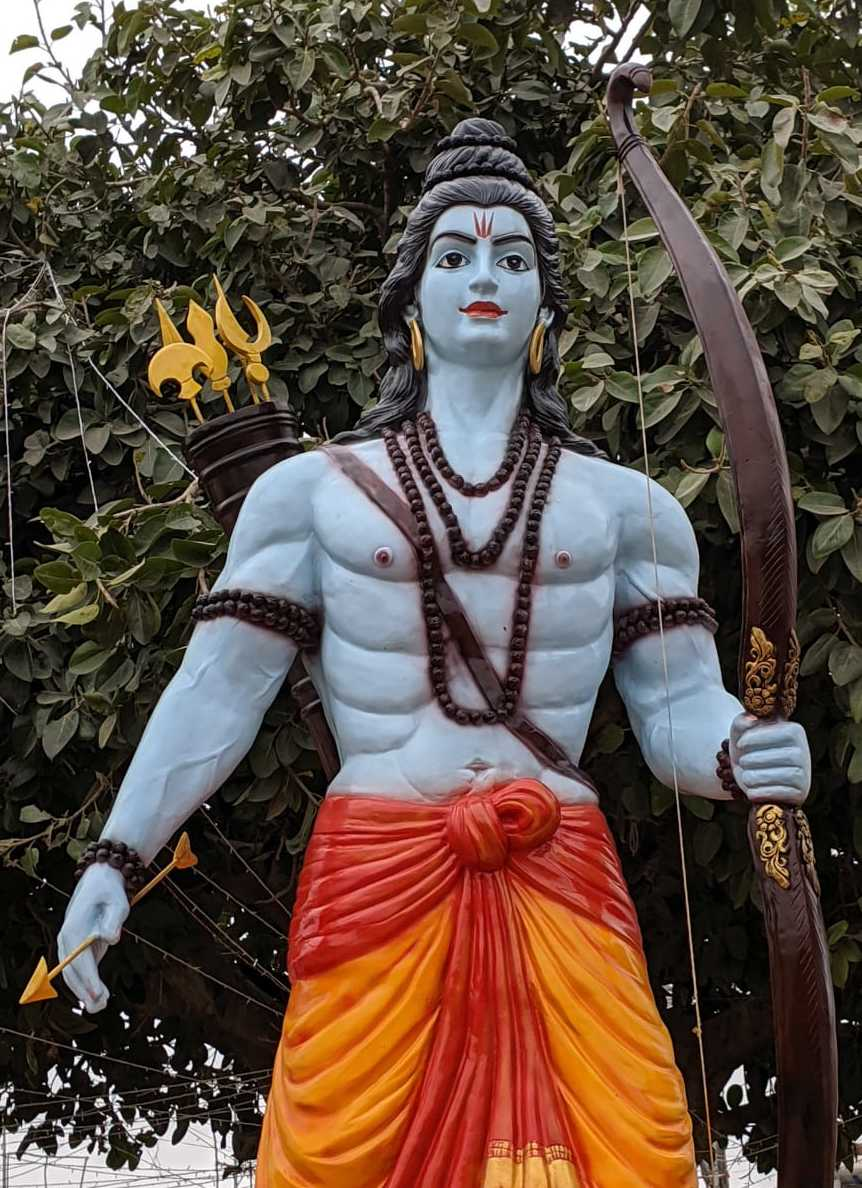
Recent Hindutva depiction of Ram as a martial figure. In this representation, Ram appears more muscular and militant than traditional depictions.

== Ideological framework ==
Hindutva’s iconoclastic acts and efforts to rewrite history are multifaceted and deeply embedded in the movement’s broader ideological and strategic objectives. By reshaping historical narratives, Hindutva aims to achieve political dominance, consolidate a unified national identity, and legitimize its sociopolitical agenda.

The primary motivation behind the rewriting of history is the consolidation of political power. By portraying Muslim rulers as oppressive tyrants and Muslim rule as a dark period that hindered India’s intellectual advancements, Hindutva seeks to justify the present-day oppression of Muslims and non-Hindus in India. It is used to evoke a sense of historical grievance and mobilize public sentiment and support for their political agenda. These historical narratives fuel communal tensions, which can be exploited during elections. By framing current political and social issues within a historical context of Hindu resistance and victimization, the Hindu right can justify their policies and actions as a necessary continuation of a long-standing struggle for Hindu rights and sovereignty.

Savarkar, among other Hindu nationalists, seek to reconstruct history to depict a glorious Hindu past to assert that Hindu identity was formed through violent resistance against non-Hindus. This narrative promotes the idea that employing violent means is a historically justified method to uphold and promote Hindu supremacy in India. The process of rewriting India’s history involves the manipulation of educational content, such as textbooks. By doing so, Hindutva can reshape the historical understanding of future generations, ensuring that their interpretation of history aligns with the goals of this movement.

Rama, a Hindu deity, has been depicted as a fair and virtuous king. However, in recent times, particularly within Hindutva imagery, Rama has been portrayed as a strong, militant figure. This martial depiction marks a significant departure from traditional devotional representations and has become a symbol of Hindu nationalism. This reinterpretation underscores the strength of the political movement, aligning Rama's image with contemporary political agendas and distancing it from the deity's religious origins.

== Socio-political impacts ==
=== Religious conflict ===
Acts of iconoclasm tend to exacerbate tensions between communities, particularly between Hindus and Muslims in India. Such events can lead to riots, violence, and a sense of insecurity among minority communities. Following the destruction of the Babri Masjid there were several months of intercommunal riots. Hindus and Muslims were in conflict that led to violent attacks, burning and looting of homes, shops, and places of worship. These riots spread to over six cities in India and collectively resulted in around 1000 deaths.

=== National identity ===
Hindutva-led iconoclasm often results in debates about the nature of Indian identity and the place of minorities within it. It can challenge the secular fabric of the nation by privileging Hindu narratives and cultural symbols over others. The struggle over historical narratives and cultural heritage often involves the renaming of streets and cities with names reflecting India's multicultural past to those associated with Hindu figures or concepts.

== See also ==
- Anti-mosque campaigning in India
- Iconoclasm § Iconoclasm in the Indian subcontinent
- Aniconism
