= Hindutva =

Indian Hindu nationalist political ideology

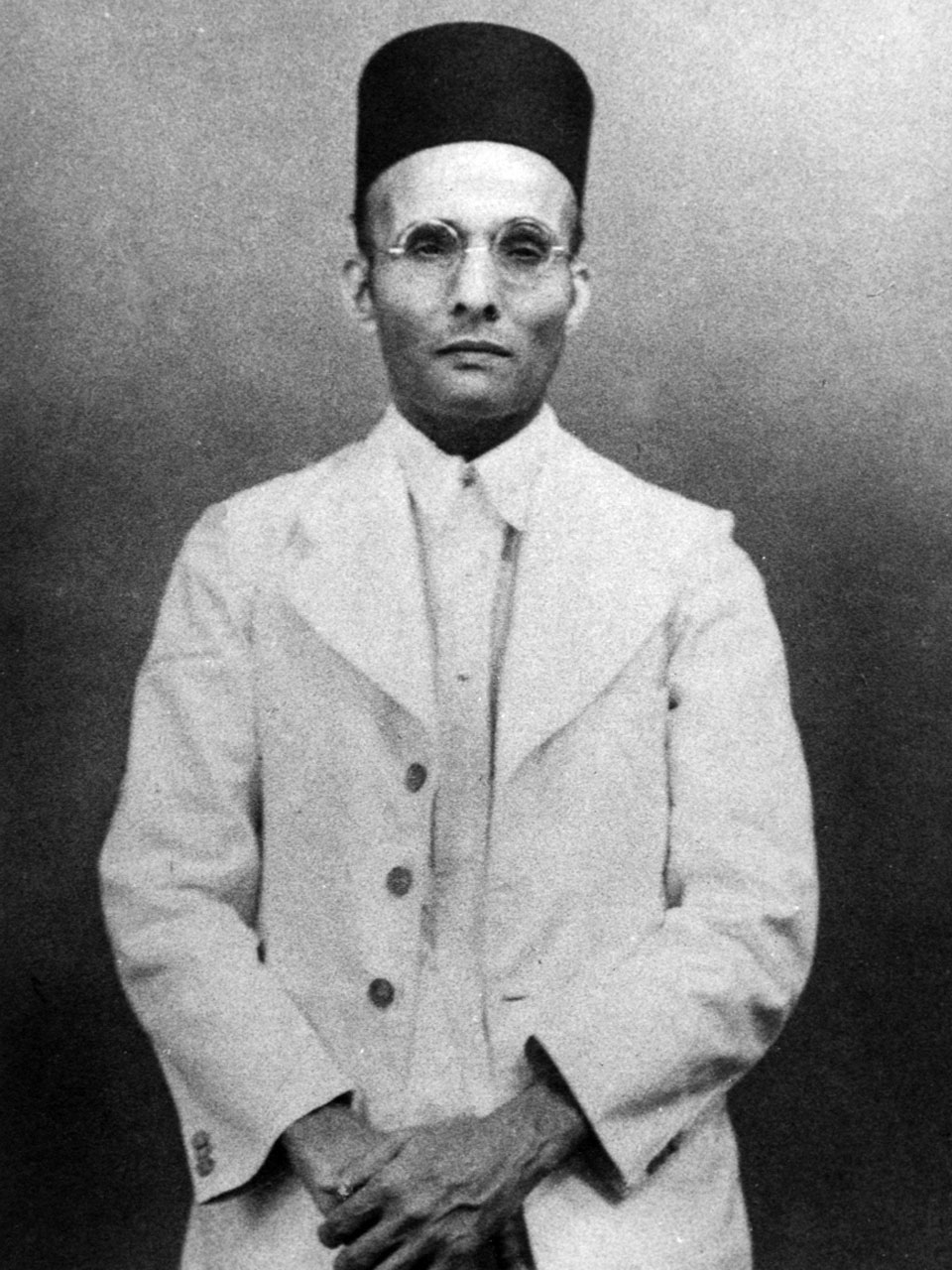
Vinayak Damodar Savarkar, the founder of Hindutva

Hindutva (Note: /hɪnˈdʊtvə/; transl. Hindu-ness) is a Hindu nationalist political ideology. Formulated by Vinayak Damodar Savarkar in Essentials of Hindutva in 1923, it is primarily espoused by the Rashtriya Swayamsevak Sangh (RSS), the Vishva Hindu Parishad (VHP), the ruling Bharatiya Janata Party (BJP), and other organisations collectively known as the Sangh Parivar.

Borrowing ideas and concepts from European fascism, the Hindutva movement engaged in a mutually beneficial relationship with Fascist Italy and Nazi Germany during the interwar period and the Second World War. Hindutva has been described as a variant of right-wing extremism and as "almost fascist in the classical sense", adhering to a concept of homogenised majority and cultural hegemony. Some analysts dispute the identification of Hindutva with fascism and suggest that Hindutva is an extreme form of conservatism or ethnic nationalism.

Proponents of Hindutva, particularly its early ideologues, have used political rhetoric and sometimes misinformation to justify the idea of a Hindu state. This movement has often been criticised for misusing Hindu religious sentiments to divide people along communal lines and for distorting the inclusive and pluralistic nature of Hinduism for political gains.

== Etymology ==
According to scholars, Hindutva is a neo-Sanskrit word, which literally translates "Hindu-ness". The word "Hindutva" gained usage among Bengali Indian intellectuals during the British colonial era. This includes Chandranath Basu, who used this word in his 1892 book, "Hindutva: Hindur Prakrita Itihas". The term was given a specific political meaning in the slightly later political ideology of Vinayak Damodar Savarkar.

=== Definitions of the term ===
==== Savarkar ====
For Savarkar, in Essentials of Hindutva, the three essentials of Hindutva were the common nation (rashtra), common race (jati), and common culture or civilisation (sanskriti). Savarkar used the words "Hindu" and "Sindhu" interchangeably. Those terms were at the foundation of his Hindutva, as geographic, cultural and ethnic concepts, and "religion did not figure in his ensemble", states Sharma. Jaffrelot agrees on the lack of importance of Hinduism within Savarkar's "ethnic brand of nationalism." His elaboration of Hindutva included all major India-origin religions of his time, i.e. Hinduism, Buddhism, Jainism, and Sikhism. Savarkar restricted "Hindu nationality" to "Indian religions" in the sense that they shared a common culture and fondness for the land of their origin. Savarkar had made clear distinction between Hinduism and Hindutva, that they are not same things as Hindutva does not concern religion or rituals but the basis of India's national character.

A Hindu means a person who regards this land of Bharatvarsha, from the Indus to the seas as his Father-Land as well as his Holy-Land that is the cradle land of his religion

— Vinayak Damodar Savarkar, Essentials of Hindutva

In summary, Savarkar's Hinduism is a concept beyond the practice of religion. It encompasses India's cultural, historical, and national identity rooted in Hindu traditions and values. Hindutva is to build a strong Hindu nation, and this is the principle that holds together the customs and culture of this land.

According to Christophe Jaffrelot, a political scientist specialising in South Asia, Savarkar – declaring himself as an atheist – "minimises the importance of religion in his definition of Hindu", and instead emphasises an ethnic group with a shared culture and cherished geography. To Savarkar, states Jaffrelot, a Hindu is "first and foremost someone who lives in the area beyond the Indus river, between the Himalayas and the Indian Ocean." Savarkar composed his ideology in reaction to the "pan-Islamic mobilisation of the Khilafat movement", where Indian Muslims were pledging support to the Istanbul-based Caliph of the Ottoman Empire and to Islamic symbols, his thoughts predominantly reflect deep hostility to Islam and its followers. To Savarkar, states Jaffrelot, "Muslims were the real enemies, not the British", because their Islamic ideology posed "a threat to the real nation, namely Hindu Rashtra" in his vision. All those who reject this historic "common culture" were excluded by Savarkar. He included those who had converted to Christianity or Islam but accepted and cherished the shared Indic culture, considering them as those who can be re-integrated.

According to Chetan Bhatt, a sociologist specialising in Human Rights and Indian nationalism, Savarkar "distances the idea of Hindu and of Hindutva from Hinduism." (Note: According to sociologist Aparna Devare, Savarkar distinguishes between Hindutva and Hinduism, but includes it in his definition. Savarkar wrote, "Hinduism is only a derivative, a fraction, a part of Hindutva.") He describes Hindutva, states Bhatt, as "one of the most comprehensive and bewildering synthetic concepts known to the human tongue" and "Hindutva is not a word but a history; not only the spiritual or religious history of our people as at times it is mistaken to be by being confounded with the other cognate term Hinduism, but a history in full."

According to biographer Janaki Bakhle, Savarkar was "not truly or fully an atheist," but he wanted to transpose sacred ideas "onto a modern political ideology." Savarkar developed "a political identity of Hindutva to unite true Indians" that that emphasized "territorial allegiance".

Savarkar's notion of Hindutva formed the foundation for his Hindu nationalism. It was a form of ethnic nationalism per the criteria set by Clifford Geertz, Lloyd Fallers, and Anthony D. Smith.

==== Supreme Court of India ====
The definition and the use of Hindutva and its relationship with Hinduism has been a part of several court cases in India. In 1966, chief justice P. B. Gajendragadkar wrote for the Supreme Court of India in Yagnapurushdasji (AIR 1966 SC 1127), that "Hinduism is impossible to define." (Note: Sen writes, "Drawing primarily from English language sources, the Court put forward the view that Hinduism was "impossible" to define [quoting from the case file Yagnapurushdasji at 1121–1128]: "When we think of the Hindu religion, we find it difficult, if not impossible, to define Hindu religion or even adequately describe it. Unlike other religions in the world, the Hindu religion does not claim any one God; it does not subscribe to any one dogma; it does not believe in one philosophic concept; it does not follow any one set of religious rites." Confronted with this amorphous entity, the Court concluded, "[I]t [Hinduism] does not appear to satisfy the narrow traditional features of any religion or creed. It may broadly be described as a way of life and nothing more.) The court adopted Radhakrishnan's submission that Hinduism is complex and "the theist and atheist, the sceptic and agnostic, may all be Hindus if they accept the Hindu system of culture and life." The Court judged that Hinduism historically has had an "inclusive nature" and it may "broadly be described as a way of life and nothing more."

The 1966 decision has significantly influenced the judicial interpretation of the term Hindutva in subsequent cases, particularly in the seven rulings delivered by the Supreme Court during the 1990s, collectively referred to as the "Hindutva judgments." These judgments broadly characterised Hindutva as a "way of life" or a "state of mind," rather than as a political ideology or a religious doctrine. These judgements have faced widespread criticism. The Indian lawyer A. G. Noorani states that the Supreme Court in its 1995 ruling gave "Hindutva a benign meaning, calling Hindutva the same as Indianisation, etc." and these were unnecessary digressions from the facts of the case, and in doing so, "the court may have brought down the wall separating religion and politics." Mukul Kesavan, a historian and writer, argues that the judgments lend legitimacy to a sectarian vision of India and undermine the secular pluralism enshrined in the constitution. According to Kesavan, the judgements effectively sanitised the ideological project of the Sangh Parivar and enabled political actors to invoke majoritarian themes without transgressing the legal boundaries of religious appeals under electoral law.

If Hindutva is at all understood as a way of life it is understood as a Hindu way of life. The proposed obliteration of difference and the development of a uniform culture is to be effected by making minorities sacrifice their own identities at the altar of Hindutva, that is, the religious and cultural practice of the majority community, the Hindus.

— Mukul Kesavan

Following the 2002 Gujarat riots, Shubhra Verma, the daughter of Justice J.S. Verma, who had authored the 1995 judgement, said, "He always had a regret about being misunderstood after 1995 and how for their own purposes, a group of politicians had twisted the spirit of his judgment." In 2016, the Supreme Court declined a plea seeking a review of the "devastating consequences" arising from its 1995 judgment.

== Ideology and themes ==
In 1923, Savarkar, a radical nationalist and ideologue, wrote Essentials of Hindutva (later retitled Hindutva: Who Is a Hindu?). In the book, he outlined his ideology and "the idea of a universal and essential Hindu identity." The term "Hindu identity" is broadly interpreted and distinguished from "ways of life and values of others." The contemporary meaning and usage of Hindutva largely derives from Savarkar's ideas, as does the post-1980s nationalism and mass political activity in India.

=== Unified Hindu identity and cultural nationalism ===
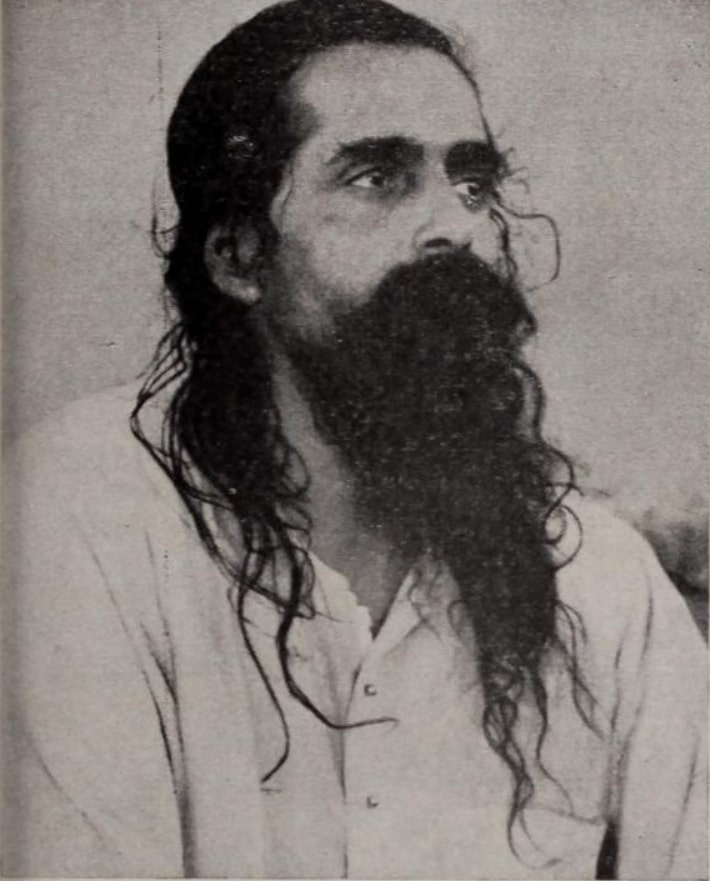
M. S. Golwalkar was the second Sarsanghchalak (Supreme Leader) of the Rashtriya Swayamsevak Sangh. One of the most influential Hindutva thinkers, Golwalkar was among the first to put forward the concept of "Hindu Rashtra" (Hindu Nation).

According to Christophe Jaffrelot, a political scientist and Indologist, Hindutva as outlined in Savarkar's writings "perfectly illustrates" an effort at identity-building through the "stigmatisation and emulation of threatening others." In particular, it was pan-Islamism and similar "Pan-isms" that he assumed made the Hindus vulnerable, as he wrote:

O Hindus, consolidate and strengthen Hindu nationality; not to give wanton offence to any of our non-Hindu compatriots, in fact to any one in the world but in just and urgent defence of our race and land; to render it impossible for others to betray her or to subject her to unprovoked attack by any of those "Pan-isms" that are struggling forth from continent to continent.

— Vinayak Damodar Savarkar

Since Savarkar's time, the "Hindu identity" and the associated Hindutva ideology has been built upon the perceived vulnerability of Indian religions, culture, and heritage from those who, through "orientalist construction," have vilified them as inferior to a non-Indian religion, culture, and heritage. In its nationalistic response, Hindutva has been conceived "primarily as an ethnic community" concept, states Jaffrelot, then presented as cultural nationalism, where Hinduism along with other Indian religions are but a part. (Note: According to Gavin Flood, a scholar of Hinduism, the term "Hindutva" differs from "Hindu dharma." The latter term means Hinduism and its various sub-traditions, while the term Hindutva in Savarkar's ideology meant the "socio-political force to unite all Hindus against foreign influences," states Flood. According to Klaus Klostermaier, a scholar of Hinduism, Hindutva has become more than the original search for Hinduness during the Indian freedom movement, and has morphed into "Hindutva movement" in the post-Independent India. This movement—though reviled by Western and West-oriented Indian scholars—has been ongoing, according to Klostermaier, as a political ideology which "takes elements of Hindu tradition and reshapes them in the light of their own time so as to provide answers to the needs of their contemporaries." In this historical and sociological context, Hindutva is an assertion of values and a non-aberrant response to the Indic experiences and memories of Islamic conquests, Christian imperialism, and the abuses of colonialism, according to Klostermaier.)

According to Arvind Sharma, a scholar of Hinduism, Hindutva has not been a "static and monolithic concept", rather its meaning and "context, text and subtext has changed over time." The struggles of the colonial era and the formulation of neo-Hinduism by the early 20th century added a sense of "ethnicity" to the original "Hinduness" meaning of Hindutva. In the post-independence period, states Sharma, the concept has suffered from ambiguity and its understanding aligned on "two different axes," one of religion-versus-culture, another of nation-versus-state. In general, the Hindutva thought among many Indians has "tried to align itself with the culture and nation [lines]".

According to Thomas Blom Hansen, its early formulation incorporated the racism and nationalism concepts prevalent in Europe during the first half of the 20th century, and culture was in part rationalised as a result of "shared blood and race." Savarkar and his Hindutva colleagues adopted the social Darwinism theories prevalent by the 1930s.

From this standpoint, sanctioned by the experience of shrewd old nations, the foreign races in Hindusthan must either adopt the Hindu culture and language, must learn to respect and hold in reverence Hindu religion, must entertain no idea but those of the glorification of the Hindu race and culture, i.e., of the Hindu nation and must lose their separate existence to merge in the Hindu race, or may stay in the country, wholly subordinated to the Hindu Nation, claiming nothing, deserving no privileges, far less any preferential treatment—not even citizen's rights. There is, at least should be, no other course for them to adopt. We are an old nation; let us deal as old nations ought to and do deal, with the foreign races, who have chosen to live in our country.

— M. S. Golwalkar

=== Views on caste ===
Savarkar, who was an atheist, opposed the caste system in several of his essays and letters. In the 1930 essay titled "Abolition of Caste" (Jatyuchchedak Nibandh), he argued that Hindus should not regard caste in any hereditary hierarchy, rather it may be treated primarily as an occupational distinction. Under Savarkar, the Hindu Mahasabha organized all-caste dinners in Nagpur and Kanpur, marking its opposition to the caste system. Savarkar noted that education can play a key role against caste discrimination and made efforts for children of the so-called lower castes to attend school, giving monetary incentives to their parents. Savarkar often noted his views on caste within the broader topic of Hindutva; such as, in his 1935 essay The Spirit of Hindutva (Hindutvache Panchapran), he argued that the caste system's connection to discrimination should be abolished.

Balasaheb Deoras, the third sarsanghchalak of the Rashtriya Swayamsevak Sangh (RSS), rejected caste and promoted "samajik samrasta" (social harmony) as a means of overcoming caste divisions. Mohan Bhagwat, the RSS's current sarsanghchalak as of 2026, has stated that the concepts of "varna" and jati should be left behind and has called for the elimination of discrimination associated with caste.

When Prime Minister V. P. Singh launched the Mandal Commission to broaden reservations in government and public university jobs to a significant portion of the Shudras who were officially branded the Other Backward Classes (OBC), the mouthpiece of the Hindutva organisation RSS, Organiser magazine, wrote of "an urgent need to build up moral and spiritual forces to counter any fallout from an expected Shudra revolution."

According to social scientist and economist Jean Drèze, the Mandal Commission angered the upper castes and threatened to distance the OBCs, but the Babri Masjid's destruction and ensuing events helped to reduce this challenge and reunified Hindus on an anti-Muslim stance. He further claims "The Hindutva project is a lifeboat for the upper castes in so far as it promises to restore the Brahminical social order" and the potential enemies of this ideology is anybody whose acts might hinder the process of restoring the Brahminic social order. Drèze further claims that although Hindutva is known as a majoritarian movement, it can be best expressed as an oppressive minority movement.

According to Jaffrelot, the Sangh Parivar organisations with their Hindutva ideology have strived to impose the belief structure of the upper caste Hindus. According to Dalit rights activist and political theorist Kancha Ilaiah, "Hindutva Is Nothing But Brahminism" and that only "Dalitisation can effectively counter the danger of Brahminical fascism disguised as Hindutva."

According to sociologist Amritorupa Sen, the privileges of the upper caste and especially Brahmins have become invisible. There has been a cultural norm that Brahmins take care of the lower castes out of a moral responsibility but also out of human kindness.

=== United India (Akhand Bharat) ===
Hindutva ideology has historically strongly emphasized the territorial unity and indivisibility of India while largely opposing separatist movements, with a central concept of Akhand Bharat ("Undivided India") that regards the Indian subcontinent as a single historical and civilizational homeland. According to historians Anderson and Damle, the RSS has been broadly promoting India's territorial unity through its conception of cultural nationalism. Historian Jaffrelot notes that the ideal of Akhand Bharat has been a longstanding objective of Hindu nationalism, reflected in resolutions of the Bharatiya Jana Sangh reaffirming commitment to "one and united India. RSS leaders have often taken a strong stance against separatism, while advocating the territorial integrity of India, such as RSS supreme leader Mohan Bhagwat, who stated at a public rally in 2016 that the Indian (Hindu) society "will not tolerate any compromise with the sovereignty, unity and integrity of the country. It is need of the hour to take stern action as per law against those who advocate separatism"

Scholar, Janaki Bakhle, identifies territorial unity as a central element of Savarkar's political thought, while author, Vinayak Chaturvedi similarly discusses Savarkar's opposition to the partition of India in 1947 and his conception of an indivisible Indian nation. Different Hindutva groups have broadly identified Akhand Bharat as a core territorial ideal that has been shared by Savarkar, the RSS, the Bharatiya Jana Sangh, and later the Bharatiya Janata Party.

==== Separatism ====
In the book, Gujarat: The Making of a Tragedy (2002), Siddharth Varadarajan postulated that while Hindutva supports the territorial integrity of India, its ideological practices can be considered a form of psychological separatism, and writes that this separatism seeks to depart from the "philosophical, cultural and civilisation mores of the country, and from more traditional and inclusive Hinduism values. Scholar, Anthony Parel, has asserted that "the agendas of Hindutva though strong on the issues of self-identity and self-definition, have tended to be separatist".

During the partition of India in 1947, which the Hindu Mahasabha broadly opposed, it also received funding from various princely states and advocated for their continued independence following India's liberation from British rule. Savarkar, in particular, praised Hindu-majority princely states such as Mysore, Agra and Oudh, and Travancore, describing them as "progressive." He defended their autocratic authority, referring to these states as "citadels of organised Hindu power."

=== Pseudohistory ===
According to Jaffrelot, the Hindutva ideology has roots in an era where the fiction in ancient Indian mythology and Vedic antiquity was presumed to be valid. This fiction was used to "give sustenance to Hindu ethnic consciousness." Its strategy emulated the Muslim identity politics of the Khilafat movement after World War I, and borrowed political concepts from the West—mainly German. Hindutva organisations treat events in Hindu mythology as history. Hindutva organisations have been criticised for their belief in statements or practices that they claim to be both scientific and factual but are incompatible with the scientific method.

According to Anthony Parel, a historian and political scientist, Savarkar's Hindutva, Who is a Hindu? published in 1923 is a fundamental text of Hindutva ideology. It asserts, states Parel, India of the past to be "the creation of a racially superior people, the Aryans. They came to be known to the outside world as Hindus, the people beyond the Indus River. Their identity was created by their race (Jati) and their culture (Sanskriti). All Hindus claim to have in their veins the blood of the mighty race incorporated with and descended from the Vedic fathers. They created a culture—an ensemble of mythologies, legends, epic stories, philosophy, art and architecture, laws and rites, feasts and festivals. They have a special relationship to India: India is to them both a fatherland and a holy land." Savarkar's text presents the "Hindu culture as a self-sufficient culture, not needing any input from other cultures," which is "an unhistorical, narcissistic and false account of India's past," states Parel.

The premises of early Hindu nationalist thought, states Chetan Bhatt, reflected the colonial era European scholarship and Orientalism of its times. The ideas of "India as the cradle of civilisation," or "humanity's homeland and primal philosophy," or "humanism in Hindu values," or of Hinduism offering redemption for contemporary humanity, along with the colonial era scholarship of Frederich Muller, Charles Wilkins, William Jones, Alexander Hamilton, and others were a natural intellectual matrix for Savarkar and others to borrow and germinate their Hindu nationalist ideas.

Chakravarthi Ram-Prasad, a Fellow of the British Academy and a scholar of Politics and Philosophy of Religion, states that Hindutva is a form of nationalism that is expounded differently by its opponents and its proponents. The opponents of Hindutva either consider it as a fundamentalist ideology that "aims to regulate the working of civil society with the imperatives of Hindu religious doctrine", or alternatively, as another form of fundamentalism while accepting that Hinduism is a diverse collection of doctrines, is complex and is different from other religions. According to Ram-Prasad, the proponents reject these tags, viewing it to be their right and a desirable value to cherish their religious and cultural traditions. Hindutva, according to Savarkar, is a "geography, race, and culture" based concept. However, the "geography" is not strictly territorial but is an "ancestral homeland of a people", and the "race" is not biogenetic but described as the historic descendants of the intermarriage of Aryans, native Dravidian peoples, and "different peoples" who arrived over time. So, "the ultimate category for Hindutva is culture," and this culture is "not strictly speaking religious, if religion is meant a commitment to certain doctrines of transcendence."

==== Hostility towards academic freedom ====
Hindutva has been associated with threats and intimidation directed at academics and students, both within India and in the United States. A notable instance occurred in 2011, when Hindutva activists successfully campaigned for the removal of an essay discussing the multiple narrative traditions of the Ramayana, an ancient Sanskrit epic, from the history syllabus at the Delhi University, one of India's most prestigious institutions of higher education. Romila Thapar, one of India's most eminent historians, has faced sustained criticism and attacks from Hindutva-affiliated groups. The Hindu right has also been implicated in efforts to discredit and obstruct scholars of South Asian studies and Hinduism based in North America. Notable figures such as Wendy Doniger and Sheldon Pollock have been targets of such campaigns. Doniger's book ceased publication in India following a legal settlement in which the publisher agreed to withdraw the title over claims that it defamed Hinduism. Pollock, similarly, was accused of misrepresenting the country's cultural heritage and of allegedly showing "disrespect for the unity and integrity of India." Under the leadership of the BJP, the Indian state has faced allegations of monitoring academics and restricting access to research resources for scholars. Audrey Truschke, an American historian of South Asia, remains a frequent target of threats and harassment by those aligned with Hindutva.

In 2021, a collective of scholars of South Asia based in North America published the Hindutva Harassment Field Manual in response to what they characterised as threats to their academic freedom emanating from Hindutva adherents. The manual documented numerous incidents of harassment, dating back to the 1990s, aimed at academics engaged in critical scholarship on South Asia and Hinduism. The Association for Asian Studies described Hindutva as a "majoritarian ideological doctrine" distinct from Hinduism and condemned the increasing attacks on scholars, artists, and journalists who engage critically with its political tenets. Several academics and conference participants withdrew from scholarly events due to threats received from ultranationalists and Hindutva-affiliated actors.

=== Fascism ===
The Hindutva ideology has significantly borrowed ideas and concepts from European fascism. Some scholars have drawn parallels between Hindutva and European fascism in concepts such as repeated mobilisations, appeals to a mythic past, anti-communism, and purist racial elements, among others. After the 1940s and 1950s, a number of scholars have labelled or compared Hindutva to fascism. Many scholars have pointed out that early Hindutva ideologues were inspired by fascist movements in early 20th-century Italy and Germany. Marzia Casolari is one such scholar who has linked the association and the borrowing of pre-World War II European fascist ideas by early leaders of Hindutva ideology.

According to Jaffrelot, the early Hindutva proponents such as Golwalkar envisioned it as an extreme form of "ethnic nationalism", but the ideology differed from fascism and Nazism in three respects. First, unlike fascism and Nazism, it did not closely associate Hindutva with its leader. Second, while fascism emphasised the primacy of the state, Hindutva considered the state to be a secondary. Third, while Nazism emphasised primacy of the race, the Hindutva ideology emphasised primacy of the society over race. Sociologists Chetan Bhatt and Parita Mukta have described difficulties in identifying Hindutva with fascism or Nazism, because of Hindutva's embrace of cultural rather than racial nationalism, its "distinctively Indian" character, and "the RSS's disavowal of the seizure of state power in preference for long-term cultural labour in civil society." They describe Hindutva as a form of "revolutionary conservatism" or "ethnic absolutism."

The Indian Marxist economist and political commentator Prabhat Patnaik calls Hindutva "almost fascist in the classical sense." He states that the Hindutva movement is based on "class support, methods and programme." According to Patnaik, Hindutva has the following fascist ingredients: "an attempt to create a unified homogeneous majority under the concept of "the Hindus"; a sense of grievance against past injustice; a sense of cultural superiority; an interpretation of history according to this grievance and superiority; a rejection of rational arguments against this interpretation; and an appeal to the majority based on race and masculinity."

According to Achin Vanaik, several authors have labelled Hindutva as fascist, but such a label requires "establishing a fascist minimum." Hindu nationalism, states Vanaik, is "a specific Indian manifestation of a generic phenomenon [of nationalism] but not one that belongs to the genus of fascism."

According to Thomas Hansen, Hindutva represents a "conservative revolution" in postcolonial India, and its proponents have been combining "paternalistic and xenophobic discourses" with "democratic and universalist discourses on rights and entitlements" based on "desires, anxieties and fractured subjectivities" in India.

==== Hindutva and Nazism ====
An editorial published on 4 February 1948 in the National Herald, the newspaper of the Indian National Congress party, stated that "it [RSS] seems to embody Hinduism in a Nazi form" with the recommendation that it must be ended. Similarly, in 1956, another Congress party leader compared the Bharatiya Jana Sangh to the Nazis in Germany. (Note: Hindutva organisations were not exclusively criticised in the 1940s by Indian political leaders. The Muslim League was criticised as well for "its creed of Islamic exclusiveness, its cult of communal hatred and its practice of terrorism and treachery" and called a replica of the German Nazis.)

Savarkar criticised Jawaharlal Nehru for condemning Germany and Italy, asserting that "crores of Hindu Sanghatanists in India [...] cherish no ill-will towards Germany or Italy or Japan." In 1938, Savarkar publicly expressed support for the German occupation of Czechoslovakia. Although, at the outbreak of the Second World War, Savarkar and the Hindu Mahasabha initially advocated a stance of neutrality, his rhetoric became increasingly strident over time. He characterised German Jews as a communal force and endorsed the Nazi persecution of the Jews. Moreover, he drew a parallel between German Jews and Indian Muslims, stating, "The Indian Muslims are on the whole more inclined to identify themselves and their interests with Muslims outside India than Hindus who live next door, like Jews in Germany." As late as 1961, he spoke favourably of Nazi Germany and contrasted it with Nehru's "cowardly democracy."

German race pride has now become the topic of the day. To keep up the purity of the Race and its culture, Germany shocked the world by her purging the country of the semitic Races—the Jews. Race pride at its highest has been manifested here. Germany has also shown how wellnigh impossible it is for Races and cultures, having differences going to the root, to be assimilated into one united whole, a good lesson for us in Hindusthan to learn and profit by.

— M. S. Golwalkar

== History ==
=== Origins ===
According to Prabhu Bapu, a historian and scholar of Oriental Studies, the term and the contextual meaning of Hindutva emerged from the Indian experience in the colonial era, memories of its religious wars as the Mughal Empire decayed, an era of Muslim and Christian proselytisation, a feeling that their traditions and cultures were being insulted, whereby the Hindu intellectuals formulated Hindutva as a "Hindu identity" as a prelude to a national resurgence and a unified Indian nation against the "foreign invaders." The development of "religious nationalism" and the demand by the Muslim leaders on the Indian subcontinent for the partition of British India into Muslim and non-Muslim nations (Pakistan and Bangladesh being Muslim-majority, and India being Hindu-majority) during the middle of the 20th century, confirmed its narrative of geographical and cultural nationalism based on Indian culture and religions. (Note: Savarkar's early writings and speeches on cultural nationalism contained an embryonic form of a two-nation theory. This embryo took a more detailed form with the Lahore Resolution of 1940 of the Muslim League, which declared, "India's Muslims were a 'separate nation'." Mohammed Ali Jinnah explained the Indian Muslims demand by asserting a cultural distinctiveness of Islam and this "constituted the rationale for a separate nation-state of 'Pakistan'." Jinnah's speech and rationale confirmed Savarkar's beliefs and his early Hindutva's narrative. The historian Prabhu Bapu quotes and summarises the ideas of the Muslim leaders in British India around 1940: "there were two nations in India, Hindu and Muslim", said Jinnah, British India should be partitioned into "Pakistan and Hindustan." According to Jinnah, "the differences between Hindus and Muslims in India were not merely religious, but entirely different ways of life and thought. [...] The two communities were distinct peoples, with different religious philosophies, social customs, literatures, and histories. [...] For more than a thousand years, the bulk of Muslims in India had lived in a different world, in a different society, in a different philosophy and a different faith. [...] Muslims must have a state of their own in which they would establish their own constitution and make their own laws." According to Prabhu, such ideas and rationale fuelled the Hindutva narrative for a radical exclusivist Hindu nation, and became "the apologia for the two-nation theory of the 1940s.") (Note: According to the Political Scientist Christophe Jaffrelot, in the pre-1947 period, the two nationalism and separatist movements in South Asia influenced each other. This history is an example of the Ernest Gellner theory of nationalism, states Jaffrelot. The Gellner theory states that nationalistic movements arise when there exist two groups, one privileged and other under-privileged. When the privilege-power equation is threatened by the social forces of history, "culture, skin pigmentation" and such ethnic markers become a basis to presume inferiority of the other and a pretext to manipulate the situation. Using a language of nationalism, one group tries to maintain the status quo, while the other seeks to overthrow it. In British India, states Jaffrelot, Muslim nationalism and separatism "certainly did not develop" from feelings of having been discriminated against, but their mobilisation came from "the fear of decline and marginalization" of their historic privilege among the Muslim elites in British India. They deployed Islamic cultural symbols and pressed for Perso-Arabic script-based Urdu language for their separatist and nationalist rationale, while Hindu nationalists deployed Hindu cultural symbols and pressed for the use of Indic script-based (Hindi) language – both languages nearly similar when spoken. The mutual use of identity symbols helped crystallise the other's convictions and fuel each other's fears. These identity symbols and the continued mutual use of such ideological statements fuel the nationalistic discourse in contemporary India and Pakistan. They have been and remain central to organisations such as the BJP and the Sangh Parivar associated with the Hindutva ideology, according to Jean-Luc Racine, a scholar of nationalisms and separatisms with a focus on South Asia.) Professor Muqtedar Khan has argued that Hindu nationalism further grew because of the religious divisions between Hindus and Muslims that were fomented by post-1947 Pakistani terrorist attacks in and military conflicts with India.

According to Chetan Bhatt, the various forms of Hindu nationalism including the recent "cultural nationalist" form of Hindutva, have roots in the second half of the 19th century. These are a "dense cluster of ideologies" of primordialism, (Note: Primordialism is the belief that the deep historical and cultural roots of nations is a quasi‐objective phenomenon, by which outsiders identify individuals of an ethnic group and what contributes to how an individual forms a self-identity.) and they emerged from the colonial experiences of the Indian people in conjunction with ideas borrowed from European thinkers but thereafter debated, adapted and negotiated. These ideas included those of a nation, nationalism, race, Aryanism, Orientalism, Romanticism and others. (Note: For example, the "writings of Giuseppe Mazzini made a profound impression on Savarkar", states Thomas Hansen.) Decades before he wrote his treatise on Hindutva, Savarkar was already famous in colonial India for his version of the Indian Rebellion of 1857. He studied in London between 1906 and 1910. There he discussed and evolved his ideas of "what constituted a Hindu identity", made friends with Indian student groups as well as non-Indian groups such as the Sinn Féin. He was a part of the underground home rule and liberation movement of Indians, before getting arrested for anti-British activities. While in prison, Savarkar submitted multiple mercy petitions to the British, seeking clemency and promising loyalty to the crown. After his release, he moved away from anti-colonial politics and worked to develop Hindutva. His political activities and intellectual journey through European publications, according to Bhatt, influenced him, his future writings, and the 20th-century Hindutva ideology that emerged from his writings.

=== Adoption ===
Savarkar's Hindutva ideology reached K. B. Hedgewar in Nagpur (Maharashtra) in 1925, and he found Savarkar's Hindutva inspirational. He visited Savarkar in Ratnagiri shortly after and discussed with him methods for organising the 'Hindu nation'. Discussions between the two led to Hedgewar founding the Rashtriya Swayamsevak Sangh (RSS, lit. "National Volunteer Society"), a far-right Hindutva paramilitary organisation with this mission, in September of that year. This organisation swiftly expanded to become the foremost Hindu nationalist organisation. However, the term Hindutva was not used to describe the ideology of the new organisation; it was Hindu Rashtra (Hindu nation), with one RSS publication stating, "it became evident that Hindus were the nation in Bharat and that Hindutva was Rashtriyatva [nationalism]."

Hedgewar's RSS not only propagated Hindutva ideology, it developed a grassroots organisational structure (shakhas) to reform the Hindu society. Village level groups met for morning and evening physical training sessions, martial training and Hindutva ideology lessons. Hedgewar kept RSS an ideologically active but an "apolitical" organisation. This practice of keeping out of national and international politics was retained by his successor M. S. Golwalkar through the 1940s. Philosopher Jason Stanley states "the RSS was explicitly influenced by European fascist movements, its leading politicians regularly praised Hitler and Mussolini in the late 1930s and 1940s." In 1931, B. S. Moonje met with Mussolini and expressed a desire to replicate the fascist youth movement in India. According to Sali Augustine, the core institution of Hindutva has been the RSS. While the RSS states that Hindutva is different from Hinduism, it has been linked to religion. Therefore "cultural nationalism" is a euphemism, states Augustine, and it is meant to mask the creation of a state with a "Hindu religious identity." According to Jaffrelot, the regional heads of the RSS have included Indians who are Hindus as well as those who belong to other Indian religions such as Jainism.

In parallel to the RSS, Savarkar, after his release from the colonial prison, joined and became the president of Akhil Bharatiya Hindu Mahasabha in 1937. There, he used the terms Hindutva and Hindu Rashtra liberally, according to Graham. Syama Prasad Mukherjee, who served as its president in 1944 and joined the Jawaharlal Nehru Cabinet after independence, was a Hindu traditionalist politician who wanted to uphold Hindu values but not necessarily to the exclusion of other communities. He asked for the membership of Hindu Mahasabha to be thrown open to all communities. When this was not accepted, he resigned from the party and founded a new political party in collaboration with the RSS. He understood Hinduism as a nationality rather than a community but, realising that this is not the common understanding of the term Hindu, he chose "Bharatiya" instead of "Hindu" to name the new party, which came to be called the Bharatiya Jana Sangh (BJS or JS; often known as the Jan Sangh), a far-right Hindutva-based political party, which served as the political arm of the RSS.

=== Growth ===
The cabinet of the first prime minister of India Jawaharlal Nehru banned the RSS and arrested more than 200,000 RSS volunteers, after Nathuram Godse, a former volunteer of RSS, assassinated Mahatma Gandhi. Nehru also appointed government commissions to investigate the assassination and related circumstances. The series of investigations by these commissions, states the political science scholar Nandini Deo, later found the RSS leadership and "the RSS innocent of a role in the assassination." The mass arrested RSS volunteers were released by the Indian courts, and the RSS has ever since used this as evidence of "being falsely accused and condemned."

According to the historian Robert Frykenberg specialising in South Asian Studies, the RSS membership enormously expanded in independent India. In this period, while the RSS remained "discretely out of politics", the Jan Sangh entered the Indian political landscape. The Jan Sangh had limited success in the Indian general elections between 1952 and 1971. This was, in part, because of its poor organisation and leadership; its focus on the Hindutva sentiment did not appeal to the voters, and its campaign lacked adequate social and economic themes. This was also, in part, because Congress party leaders such Indira Gandhi had co-opted some of the key Hindutva ideological themes and fused it with socialist policies and her father's Soviet-style centrally controlled economic model. The RSS continued its grassroots operations between 1947 and early 1970s, and its volunteers provided humanitarian assistance to Hindu and Sikh refugees from the partition of British India, victims of war and violence, and helped disaster victims to resettle economically.

From 1975 to 1977, Indira Gandhi declared and enforced a national emergency, which saw widespread censorship, mass arrests of dissenters and political opponents, the suspension of the constitution, and the nullification of fundamental rights, alongside a rule by decree and an unprecedented centralisation of power. The abuses of Emergency triggered a mass resistance and the rapid growth of volunteers and political support to the Hindutva ideology. Indira Gandhi and her party were voted out of power in 1977. The Hindutva ideology-based Jan Sangh members such as Atal Bihari Vajpayee, Brij Lal Varma, and L. K. Advani gained national prominence, and the Hindutva ideology sympathiser Morarji Desai became the prime minister of a coalition non-Congress government. This coalition did not last past 1980, and from the consequent break-up of coalition parties was the founding of the Bharatiya Janata Party in April 1980. This new national political party relied on the Hindutva ideology-based rural and urban grassroots organisations that had rapidly grown across India from the mid-1970s.

=== Hindutva under Modi (2014–present) ===
Since the 2014 Indian general election with the BJP winning, the premiership of Narendra Modi and state based BJP governments have pushed parts of the Hindutva agenda.

==== Abrogation of the special status of Jammu and Kashmir ====
On 5 August 2019, the Modi administration revoked the special status, or limited autonomy, granted to Jammu and Kashmir under Article 370 of India's Constitution. The decision was upheld by the Supreme Court. The revocation was accompanied by the deployment of thousands of security forces, the detention and arrest of several Kashmiri politicians including a former chief minister, as well as the imposition of a years-long lockdown and communications blackout which saw intense government crackdown and the detention of thousands of Kashmiri civilians. (Note: Sources: "Article 370: What happened with Kashmir and why it matters". BBC. 6 August 2019.; Yasir, Sameer (5 August 2019). "India Moves to Revoke Kashmir's Special Status Amid Crackdown". The New York Times. Archived from the original on 5 August 2019.; Farooq, Azhar; Ratcliffe, Rebecca (23 August 2019). "Kashmir city on lockdown after calls for protest march". The Guardian.; "At Least 2,300 People Have Been Detained During the Lockdown in Kashmir". Time. Archived from the original on 21 August 2019.) The government's move was criticised and opposed, though it was heavily celebrated in nationalist and Hindutva circles across the country.

==== Ayodhya dispute ====
The Supreme Court of India delivered a verdict on the construction of Ram Mandir, a Hindu temple on the disputed land of Ayodhya. The ruling included a stipulation that a 5 acres (20,000 m^{2}) of land at an alternative site be provided to the Sunni Waqf Board for the construction of a new mosque. A report made by the Archaeological Survey of India stating that the remains of a "Hindu structure" were found at the disputed Babri Masjid/Ram Janmabhoomi site was considered by the court. On 5 August 2020, Narendra Modi performed a ground-breaking ceremony (Bhumi-pujan) to open the construction of Ram Mandir at the Ayodhya; construction was completed in January 2024. Modi gave a speech, declaring, "Ram is the faith of India... Ram is the leader and Ram is the policy."

==== Forced conversion bans ====
Indian states that prohibit forced conversions (2022)

Many BJP-ruled states, such as Uttar Pradesh, Madhya Pradesh, Haryana and Karnataka, have considered laws designed to prevent forced conversions from Hinduism to Islam through marriage. Hindutva advocates call this "love jihad", and it is widely considered to be an Islamophobic conspiracy theory. In September 2020, Uttar Pradesh Chief Minister Yogi Adityanath asked his government to come up with a strategy to prevent "religious conversions in the name of love." On 31 October, he announced that a law to curb "love jihad" (Note: As of November 2020, "love jihad" is a term not recognized by the Indian legal system.) would be passed by his government. The law, which also includes provisions against "unlawful religious conversion", declares a marriage null and void if the sole intention was to "change a girl's religion" and both it and the one in Madhya Pradesh imposed sentences of up to 10 years in prison for those who broke the law. The ordinance came into effect on 28 November 2020 as the Prohibition of Unlawful Religious Conversion Ordinance. In December 2020, Madhya Pradesh approved an anti-conversion law similar to the Uttar Pradesh one. As of 25 November 2020, Haryana and Karnataka were still in discussion over similar ordinances. In April 2021, the Gujarat Assembly amended the Freedom of Religion Act, 2003, bringing in stringent provisions against forcible conversion through marriage or allurement, with the intention of targeting "love jihad." The Karnataka state cabinet also approved an anti-conversion bill, making it a law in December 2021. This law was revoked by the new Government of Karnataka.

== Organisations ==
=== Sangh Parivar ===
Hindutva is the guiding ideology of the RSS and its affiliated family of organisations, the Sangh Parivar. In general, Hindutvavadis (followers of Hindutva) believe that they represent the well-being of Dharmic religions: Hinduism, Sikhism, Buddhism, and Jainism.

Most nationalists are organised into political, cultural and social organisations using the concept of Hindutva as a political tool. The first Hindutva organisation formed was the RSS, founded in 1925. A prominent Indian political party, the BJP, is closely associated with a group of organisations that advocate Hindutva. They collectively refer to themselves as the "Sangh Parivar" or family of associations, and include the RSS, Bajrang Dal and the VHP. Other organisations include:

- Hindu Swayamsevak Sangh, the overseas branch of the RSS
- Bharatiya Mazdoor Sangh, a workers' union
- Akhil Bharatiya Vidyarthi Parishad, a students' union
- Bharatiya Kisan Sangh, a farmers' organisation

Political parties that are independent from the Sangh Parivar's influence but that also espouse the Hindutva ideology include the Hindu Mahasabha, Prafull Goradia's Akhil Bharatiya Jana Sangh, and the Marathi nationalist Shiv Sena, Shiv Sena (UBT) and the Maharashtra Navnirman Sena. The Shiromani Akali Dal (SAD) is a Sikh religious party that maintained ties with Hindutva organisations and political parties, as they also represent Sikhism. By September 2020, SAD left the NDA over the farms bill.

=== Vishva Hindu Parishad and the Bharatiya Janata Party ===
The RSS established a number of affiliate organisations after Indian Independence to carry its ideology to various parts of society. Prominent among them is the Vishva Hindu Parishad, which was set up in 1964 with the objective of protecting and promoting the Hindu religion. It subscribed to Hindutva ideology, which came to mean in its hands political Hinduism and Hindu militancy.

A number of political developments in the 1980s caused a sense of vulnerability among the Hindus in India. This was much discussed and leveraged by the Hindutva ideology organisations. These developments include the mass killing of the Hindus by the militant Khalistan movement, the influx of undocumented Bangladeshi immigration into Assam coupled with the expulsion of Hindus from Bangladesh, the Congress-led government's pro-Muslim bias in the Shah Bano case as well as the Rushdie affair. The VHP and the BJP utilised these developments to push forward a militant Hindutva nationalist agenda leading to the Ram Janmabhoomi movement. The BJP officially adopted Hindutva as its ideology in its 1989 Palampur resolution.

The BJP claims that Hindutva represents "cultural nationalism" and its conception of "Indian nationhood", but not a religious or theocratic concept. It is "India's identity", according to the RSS supreme leader Mohan Bhagwat.

According to the anthropologist and South Asia Politics scholar Thomas Hansen, Hindutva in the post-Independence era has emerged as a political ideology and a populist form of Hindu nationalism. For Indian nationalists, it has subsumed "religious sentiments and public rituals into a larger discourse of national culture (Bharatiya culture) and the Hindu nation, Hindu rashtra", states Hansen. This notion has appealed to the masses in part because it "connects meaningfully with everyday anxieties of security, a sense of disorder" in modern Indian life. The BJP has deployed the Hindutva theme in its election campaign since early 1991, as well as nominated candidates who are affiliated with organisations that support the Hindutva ideology. The campaign language of the Congress Party leader Rajiv Gandhi in the 1980s mirrored those of Hindutva proponents. The political speeches and publications by Indian Muslim leaders have declared their "Islamic religious identity" being greater than any "political ideology or national identity." These developments, states Hansen, have helped Hindu nationalists spread essentialist constructions per contemporary Hindutva ideology.

=== Outside of India ===
Hindutva has been spread outside of India through the founding of specific groups abroad. The RSS established the first overseas-based Hindutva group in Kenya in 1947. Today a robust network of Hindutva groups exist in the United States, United Kingdom, and elsewhere. Hindutva groups sometimes register as foreign agents to comply with local laws.

== Concepts and issues ==
=== Uniform Civil Code ===
The Hindutva leaders have sought a Uniform Civil Code for all the citizens of India, where the same law applies to all its citizens irrespective of the individual's religion. They state that differential laws based on religion violate the Indian Constitution and have sowed the seeds of divisiveness between different religious communities. Under the current laws that were enacted in 1955–56, state John Hutchinson and Anthony D. Smith, the constitutionally directive principle of a Uniform Civil Code covers only non-Muslims. The Uniform Civil Code is opposed by the Muslim leaders. A Uniform Civil Code that applies equally to the Muslims in India is also opposed by political parties such as the Indian National Congress and the Communist Party.

=== Protection of Hindu interests ===
The followers of Hindutva are known for their criticism of the Indian government as too passive with regard to the exodus of Kashmiri Hindus by Kashmiri Muslim separatists and the 1998 Wandhama massacre, and advocates of Hindutva wish a harder stance in Jammu and Kashmir. The supporters of Hindutva sought to protect the native Hindu culture and traditions especially those that symbolised the Hindu culture. They believe that Indian culture is identical with the Hindu culture. These include animals, language, holy structures, rivers and medicine.

They opposed the continuation of Urdu being used as a vernacular language as they associated it with Muslims. They felt that Urdu symbolised a foreign culture. For them, Hindi alone was the unifying factor for all the diverse forces in the country. They even wanted to make Hindi as the official language of India and felt that it should be promoted at the expense of English and the other regional languages, with some Hindutva followers describing this with the slogan "Hindi-Hindu-Hindustan." However, this caused a state of tension and alarm in the non-Hindi regions. The non-Hindi regions saw it as an attempt by the north to dominate the rest of the country. Eventually, this demand was put down in order to protect the cultural diversity of the country.

Hindutva activists have boycotted several Bollywood movies in recent years, claiming that they use too much Urdu and are anti-Hindu; some activists have called for South Indian cinema to be patronised instead, claiming that it is more culturally rooted. Hindutva opposition to Urdu coincides with a desire to spread a Sanskritised Hindi across India.

== Hindutva violence ==
Since the mid-2010s, there has been a notable increase in violence motivated by Hindutva ideology, particularly towards Muslims, and includes acts of extremist terroristic violence. This has principally been perpetrated by or has implicated members, or alleged members, of Hindu nationalist organisations such as the RSS or Abhinav Bharat. The violence has also been condoned by the BJP politicians and used as an electoral strategy to garner support from the far-right Hindu population. The veneration of cows as deities and restrictions on meat consumption have also been used by to justify violence against Muslims, Christians, Dalits, and lower-caste Hindus.

=== Cow vigilantism ===
There has been a rise in the number of incidents of cow vigilantism since the election of a BJP majority in the Parliament of India in 2014. The frequency and severity of cow vigilante violence has been described as "unprecedented." Human Rights Watch has reported that there has been a surge in such violence since 2015. The surge is attributed to the recent rise in Hindu nationalism in India. Many vigilante groups say they feel "empowered" by the victory of the Hindu nationalist BJP in the 2014 election.

According to a Reuters report, there were 63 attacks in India between 2010 and mid 2017 resulting in 28 deaths, 24 of them Muslim, and 124 injuries. Most attacks occurred after Narendra Modi took office in 2014.

Many BJP states have passed laws against cattle slaughter such as Gujarat. On 6 June 2017, Uttar Pradesh's Chief Minister Yogi Adityanath directed the state police to take action against cow slaughter and cattle smuggling under the National Security Act and the Gangster Act, and in (2021) Assam Assembly passed a bill that prohibits the slaughter or sale of beef within a 5-kilometre (3.1 mi) radius of any temple. The legislation seeks to ensure that permission for slaughter is not granted to areas that are predominantly inhabited by Hindu, Jain, Sikh and other non-beef eating communities or places that fall within a 5-kilometre (3.1 mi) radius of a temple, satra and any other institution as may be prescribed by the authorities. Exemptions, however, might be granted for certain religious occasions.

== Hindutva pop ==
Hindutva pop is a subgenre of Indian pop promoting Hindutva ideas. It openly calls for violence against many non-Hindu minorities, especially Muslims. Hindutva pop artists defend their music as neither xenophobic nor Islamophobic, arguing it promotes truth. Popular Hindutva pop artists like Laxmi Dubey and Prem Krishnavanshi mainstream the xenophobic values of the genre.

== See also ==
- Communalism (South Asia) – Violence between ethnic or other communal groups
- Hindutva pseudohistory – Hindutva approach to historiography
- Hindutva boycott of Hindi cinema – Opposition to apparent Muslim influence in Bollywood
- Hindutva iconoclasm – Destruction of religious centers, art, and artifacts by Hindutva militants
- Hindutva terrorism – Terrorist acts by groups of individuals who profess Hindu motivations or goals
- Trads (Hindutva) – Loose group of alt-right activists and internet trolls
- Saffronisation – Policies implementing Hindu nationalist views of history
- NCERT textbook controversies – Educational controversies in India
