= Love jihad conspiracy theory =

Islamophobic conspiracy theory

Love jihad (or Romeo jihad) is an Islamophobic conspiracy theory promoted by Hindutva activists that aims to misrepresent consensual marriages between Hindu women and Muslim men to be a part of broader agenda of initiating religious conversions into Islam. The conspiracy theory purports that Muslim men target Hindu women for conversion to Islam by means such as seduction, feigning love, deception, kidnapping, and marriage, as part of a broader demographic "war" by Muslims against India, and an organised international conspiracy, for domination through demographic growth and replacement.

The conspiracy theory relies on disinformation and is noted for its similarities to other historic hate campaigns as well as contemporary white nationalist conspiracy theories and Western Islamophobia. It features Orientalist portrayals of Muslims as barbaric and hypersexual, and carries the paternalistic and patriarchal notions that Hindu women are passive and victimised, while "any possibility of women exercising their legitimate right to love and their right to choice is ignored". It has consequently been the cause of vigilante assaults, murders and other violent incidents, including the 2013 Muzaffarnagar riots.

Created in 2009 as part of a campaign to foster fear and paranoia, the conspiracy theory was disseminated by Hindutva publications, such as the Sanatan Prabhat and the Hindu Janajagruti Samiti website, calling Hindus to protect their women from Muslim men who were simultaneously depicted to be attractive seducers and lecherous rapists. Organisations including the Rashtriya Swayamsevak Sangh (RSS) and the Vishva Hindu Parishad (VHP) have since been credited for its proliferation in India and abroad, respectively. The conspiracy theory was noted to have become a significant belief in the state of Uttar Pradesh by 2014 and contributed to the success of the Bharatiya Janata Party (BJP) campaign in the state.

The concept was institutionalised in India after the election of the BJP led by Narendra Modi. Right-wing pro-government television media, such as Times Now and Republic TV, and social media disinformation campaigns are generally held responsible for the growth of its popularity. Legislation against the purported conspiracy has been initiated in a number of states ruled by the party and implemented in the state of Uttar Pradesh by the Yogi Adityanath government, where it has been used as a means of state repression against Muslims and crackdown on interfaith marriages. A 2017 case brought before the Supreme Court of India led to a wider probe by the National Investigation Agency of 11 interfaith marriages in Kerala that were already the subject of legal proceedings; the agency found no evidence of legally actionable coercion and reiterated that religious conversion is allowed by the Constitution of India.

In Myanmar, the conspiracy theory has been adopted by the 969 Movement as an allegation of Islamisation of Buddhist women and used by the Tatmadaw as justification for military operations against Rohingya civilians. It has extended among the non-Muslim Indian diaspora and led to formation of alliances between Hindutva groups and Western far-right organisations such as the English Defence League. It has also been adopted in part by the clergy of the Catholic Church in Kerala to dissuade interfaith marriage among Christians.

== Background ==
=== Regional historical tensions ===
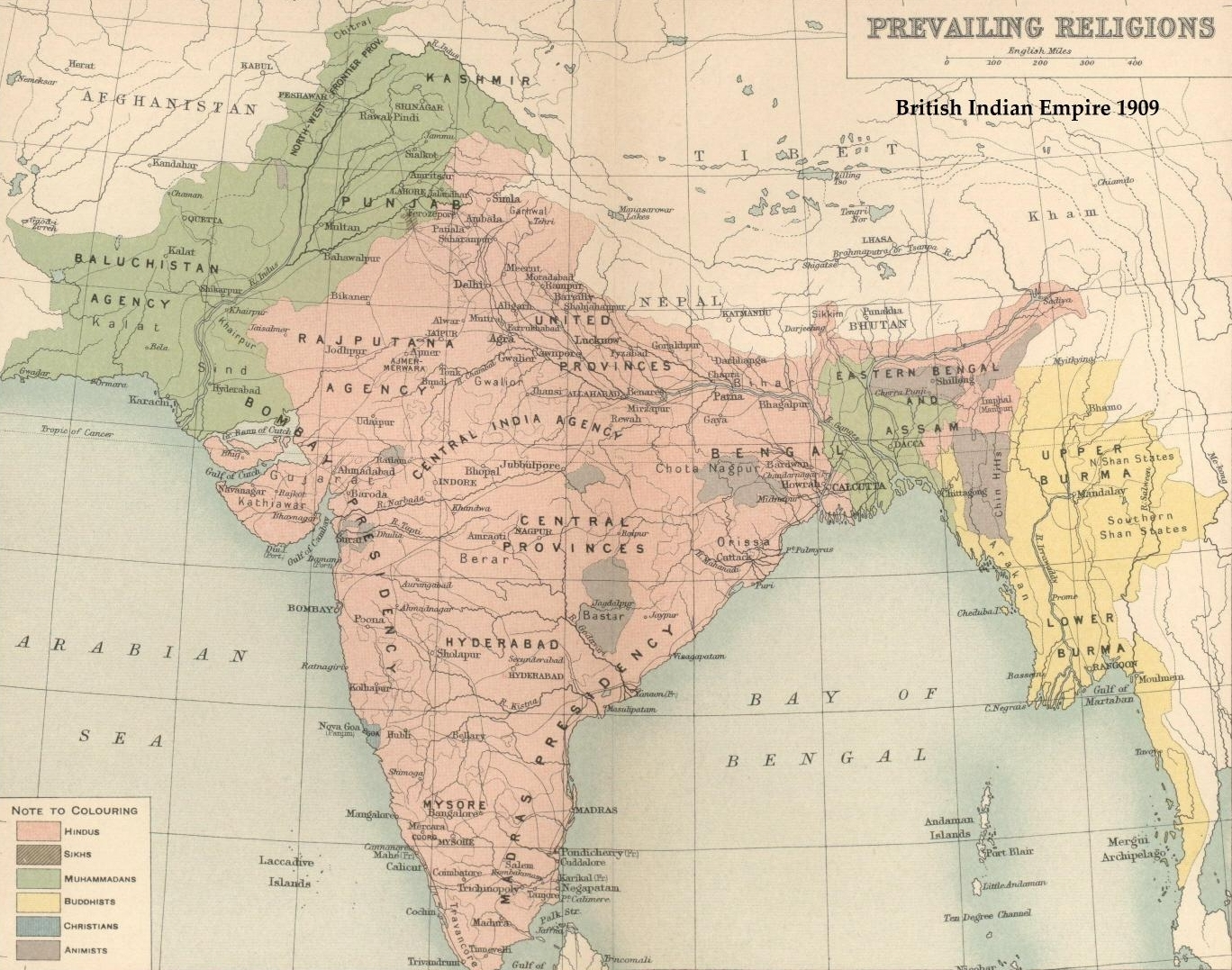
The Indian subcontinent has been religiously pluralistic for centuries. This map from 1909 shows Muslim regions in the northwest in green mixing with Hindu regions stretching across most of the region into Buddhist Burma.

Foreign Policy correspondent Siddhartha Mahanta assessed that the modern Love Jihad conspiracy has roots in the 1947 partition of India. The ensuing mass migrations of Muslims and Hindus between India and Pakistan included rampant reports of sexual predation and forced conversions of women by men of both faiths. Women on both sides of the conflict were impacted, leading to "recovery operations" of these women by both the Indian and Pakistani governments, with over 20,000 Muslim and 9,000 non-Muslim women being recovered between 1947 and 1956. According to Mahanta, clashes between the faiths repeated in the following decades, as cultural pressure against interfaith marriage rose on both sides.

By 2011, Hindus were the religious majority in India, at 80%, with Muslims at 14% an increase from 9% from 1951 while the Hindu population of Pakistan has remained at 2% and that of Bangladesh fallen to 8%. In the 1951 census, West Pakistan (now Pakistan) had 1.3% Hindu population, while East Pakistan (now Bangladesh) had 22.05%.

=== Marriage traditions and customs ===
Through the 2000s and 2010s, India witnessed a rise in love marriages, in contrast to a long tradition of arranged marriages. However, tensions continue around interfaith marriages, along with other traditionally discouraged unions. In 2012, The Hindu reported that illegal intimidation against consenting couples engaging in such discouraged unions, including inter-religious marriage, had surged. That year, Uttar Pradesh saw the proposal of an amendment to remove the requirement to declare religion from the marriage law in hopes of encouraging those who were hiding their interfaith marriage due to social norms to register.

One of the tensions surrounding interfaith marriage relates to expectations of marital conversion, which may be forced. Marriage in Islam is a legal contract with requirements around the religions of the participants. While Muslim women are only permitted within the contract to marry Muslim men, Muslim men may marry "People of the Book", interpreted by most to include Jews and Christians, with Hindus and other idolators excluded. According to a 2014 article in the Mumbai Mirror, some non-Muslim brides in Muslim–Hindu marriages convert, while other couples choose a civil marriage under the Special Marriage Act of 1954. Marriage between Muslim women and Hindu men (including Sikh, Jaina, and Buddhist) is legal civil marriage under The Special Marriage Act of 1954.

=== Hindutva and right-wing politics ===
Love jihad in politics has been closely tied to Hindutva, a Hindu nationalist movement, which is associated with the BJP Prime Minister of India, Narendra Modi. The anti-Islamic stances of many right wing Hindutva groups like Vishva Hindu Parishad (VHP) are usually hostile to inter-religious marriage and religious pluralism, which can sometimes result in mob violence motivated by allegations of love jihad.

== Timeline ==
=== Early origins and beginnings ===
Similar controversies over inter religious marriage were relatively common in India from the 1920s until independence in 1947, when allegations of forced marriage were typically called "abductions". They were more common in religiously diverse areas, including campaigns against both Muslims and Christians, and were tied to fears over religious demographics and political power in the newly emerging Indian nation. Fears of women converting was also a catalyst of the violence against women that occurred during that period.

The Indian Express identified a case in Karnataka as the first time a public allegation of "love jihad" was used to attempt to unwind a love marriage. In August 2009, an 18-year-old Hindu woman eloped and married a Muslim man after her father had refused permission for the union. Her father, unsuccessful in retrieving her on his own, induced the Karnataka High Court to order a police investigation into a supposed jihad, and the woman was ordered to return to her parents for the duration of the proceedings. By November of the same year, the police filed an interim report concluding that the marriage was consensual; the woman returned to her husband afterward.

Love jihad allegations rose to national awareness in September 2009, when the Kerala High Court directed police to investigate two claims of college-age women being forced to convert to Islam for their husbands.

According to the Kerala Catholic Bishops Council, by October 2009 up to 4,500 girls in Kerala had been targeted, whereas Hindu Janajagruti Samiti claimed that 30,000 girls had been converted in Karnataka alone. Sree Narayana Dharma Paripalana general secretary Vellapally Natesan said that there had been reports in Narayaneeya communities of "Love Jihad" attempts. Following the controversy's initial flare-up in 2009, it flared again in 2010, 2011 and 2014. On 25 June 2014, Kerala Chief Minister Oommen Chandy informed the state legislature that 2,667 young women converted to Islam in the state between 2006 and 2014. However, he stated that there was no evidence for any of them being forced to convert, and that fears of Love Jihad were "baseless". Muslim organizations such as the Popular Front of India and the Campus Front have been accused of promoting this activity. In Kerala, some movies have been accused of promoting Love Jihad, a charge which has been denied by the filmmakers. The Bollywood films PK and Bajrangi Bhaijaan were accused of promoting Love jihad by Hindu outfits. The actors and directors denied that their films promoted Love jihad.

Around the same time that the conspiracy theory was beginning to spread, accounts of Love Jihad also became prevalent in Myanmar. Wirathu, the leader of 969 Movement, has said that Muslim men pretend to be Buddhists and then the Buddhist women are lured into Islam in Myanmar. He has urged to "protect our Buddhist women from the Muslim love-jihad" by introducing further legislation. Reports of similar activities also began emerging from the United Kingdom's Sikh diaspora. In 2014, The Sikh Council alleged that it had received reports that girls from British Sikh families were becoming victims of Love Jihad. Furthermore, these reports alleged that these girls were being exploited by their husbands, some of whom afterwards abandoned them in Pakistan. According to the Takht Jathedar, he alleged that "The Sikh council has rescued some of the victims (girls) and brought them back to their parents".

=== Congress Party era (2009–2014) ===
The initial formations of the conspiracy theory were solidified when various organisations began joining. Christian groups, such as the Christian Association for Social Action, and the Vishva Hindu Parishad (VHP) banded against it, with the VHP establishing the "Hindu Helpline" that it started answered 1,500 calls in three months related to "Love Jihad". The Union of Catholic Asian News (UCAN) has reported that the Catholic Church was concerned about this alleged phenomenon. In September, posters of right-wing group Shri Ram Sena warning against "Love Jihad" appeared in Thiruvananthapuram, Kerala. The group announced in December that it would launch a nationwide "Save our daughters, save India" campaign to combat "Love Jihad". Muslim organizations in Kerala called it a malicious misinformation campaign. Popular Front of India (PFI) committee-member Naseeruddin Elamaram denied that the PFI was involved in any "Love Jihad", stating that people convert to Hinduism and Christianity as well and that religious conversion is not a crime. Members of the Muslim Central Committee of Dakshina Kannada and Udupi districts responded by claiming that Hindus and Christians have fabricated these claims to undermine Muslims.

In July 2010, the "Love Jihad" controversy resurfaced in the press when Kerala Chief Minister V. S. Achuthanandan referenced the alleged matrimonial conversion of non-Muslim girls as part of an effort to make Kerala a Muslim majority state. PFI dismissed his statements due to the findings of the Kerala probe, but the president of the BJP Mahila Morcha, the women's wing of the conservative Bharatiya Janata Party, called for an NIA investigation, alleging that the Kerala state probe was closed prematurely due to a tacit understanding with PFI. The Congress Party in Kerala responded strongly to the Chief Minister's comments, which they described as deplorable and dangerous.

In December 2011, the controversy erupted again in Karnataka legislative assembly, when member Mallika Prasad of the Bharatiya Janata Party asserted that the problem was ongoing and unaddressed – with, according to her, 69 of 84 Hindu girls who had gone missing between January and November of that year confessing after their recovery that "they'd been lured by Muslim youths who professed love". According to The Times of India, response was divided, with Deputy Speaker N. Yogish Bhat and House Leader S. Suresh Kumar supporting governmental intervention, while Congress members B. Ramanath Rai and Abhayachandra Jain argued that "the issue was being raised to disrupt communal harmony in the district".

=== Bharatiya Janata Party era (2014–present) ===
During the resurgence of the controversy in 2014, protests turned violent at growing concern, even though, according to Reuters, the concept was considered "an absurd conspiracy theory by mainstream, moderate Indians". Then BJP MP Yogi Adityanath alleged that Love Jihad was an international conspiracy targeting India, announcing on television that the Muslims "can't do what they want by force in India, so they are using the love jihad method here". Conservative Hindu activists cautioned women in Uttar Pradesh to avoid Muslims and not to befriend them. In Uttar Pradesh, the influential committee Akhil Bharitiya Vaishya Ekta Parishad announced their intention to push to restrict the use of cell phones among young women to prevent their being vulnerable to such activities.

Following this announcement, The Times of India reported that the Senior Superintendent of Police in UP, Shalabh Mathur, "said the term 'love jihad' had been coined only to create fear and divide society along communal lines". Muslim leaders referred to the 2014 rhetoric around the alleged conspiracy as a campaign of hate. Feminists voiced concerns that efforts to protect women against the alleged activities would negatively impact women's rights, depriving them of free choice and agency.

In September 2014, BJP MP Sakshi Maharaj claimed that Muslim boys in madrasas are being motivated for Love Jihad with proposals of rewards of "Rs 11 lakh for an 'affair' with a Sikh girl, Rs 10 lakh for a Hindu girl and Rs 7 lakh for a Jain girl". He claimed to know this through reports to him by Muslims and by the experiences of men in his service who had converted for access. Abdul Razzaq Khan, the vice-president of Jamiat Ulama Hind, responded by denying such activities, labeling the comments "part of conspiracy aimed at disturbing the peace of the nation" and demanding action against Maharaj. Uttar Pradesh minister Mohd Azam Khan indicated the statement was "trying to break the country". In January, Vishwa Hindu Parishad's women's wing, Durga Vahini used actor Kareena Kapoor's morphed picture half covered with burqa issue of their magazine, on the theme of Love Jihad. The caption underneath read: "conversion of nationality through religious conversion". In June 2018, Jharkhand High Court granted a divorce to national level shooter Tara Shahdeo in an alleged love jihad case in which the accused lied about his religion and forced the victim to convert to Islam after marriage.

==== 2017 Hadiya court case ====
In May 2017, the Kerala High Court annulled a marriage of a converted Hindu woman Akhila alias Hadiya to a Muslim man Shafeen Jahan on the grounds that the bride's parents were not present, nor gave consent for the marriage, after allegations by her father of conversion and marriage at the behest of the Islamic State of Iraq and Syria (ISIS). Hadiya's father had claimed that his daughter had been influenced to marry a Muslim man by some organisations so she no longer remained in her parents' custody. However, Hadiya claimed that she had been following Islam since 2012 and had left her home of her own will. Akhila was married to Shafeen by the time her father's petition was taken up by the court, following which her marriage was annulled.

The decision of the court was challenged by Shafeen in the Supreme Court of India in July 2017. The Supreme Court sought the response from the National Investigating Agency (NIA) and the Kerala government, ordering an NIA probe headed by former SC Judge R. V. Raveendran on 16 August. The NIA had earlier submitted that the woman's conversion and marriage was not "isolated" and it had detected a pattern emerging in the state.

The Supreme Court on 8 March 2018 overturned the annulment of Hadiya's marriage by the Kerala High Court and held that the she had married of her own free will. However, it allowed NIA to continue investigation into the allegations of a terror dimension. The NIA examined 11 interfaith marriages in Kerala and completed its investigation in October 2018, concluding that "the agency has not found any evidence to suggest that in any of these cases either the man or the woman was coerced to convert".

==== 2020 legislation and outcomes ====
Despite drawing severe criticisms, the Syro Malabar Church continued to repeat its stand on "love jihad". According to the church, Christian women are being targeted, recruited to terrorist outfit Islamic State, making them sex slaves and even killed. Detailing this, a circular, issued by Church chief Cardinal Mar George Alencherry, was read out in many parishes at the Sunday mass. In the circular (dated 15 January 2020) that was read out in churches on Sunday, it is stated that Christian women are being targeted under a conspiracy through inter-religious relationships, which often grow as a threat to religious harmony. "Christian women from Kerala are even being recruited to Islamic State through this", the circular read. Further, Kerala Catholic Bishops Conference's (KCBC) Commission for Social Harmony and Vigilance, claimed that there were 4,000 instances of "love jihad" between 2005 and 2012.

On 27 September 2020, protests occurred after a young Muslim man attempted to kidnap a 21-year-old Hindu woman near her college campus, and fatally shot her when she resisted. Her family said that he had tried to force her to convert to Islam and marry him.

Many BJP-ruled states, such as Uttar Pradesh, Madhya Pradesh, Haryana and Karnataka, then began mulling over laws designed to prevent "forcible conversions" through marriage, commonly referred to as "love jihad" laws. In September 2020, Uttar Pradesh Chief Minister Yogi Adityanath asked his government to come up with a strategy to prevent "religious conversions in the name of love". On 31 October, he announced that a law to curb "love jihad" (Note: As of November 2020, "love jihad" is a term not recognised by the Indian legal system.) would be passed by his government. The law in Uttar Pradesh, which also includes provisions against "unlawful religious conversion", declares a marriage null and void if the sole intention was to "change a girl's religion" and both it and the one in Madhya Pradesh imposed sentences of up to 10 years in prison for those who broke the law. The ordinance came into effect on 28 November 2020 as the Prohibition of Unlawful Religious Conversion Ordinance. In December 2020, Madhya Pradesh approved an anti-conversion law similar to the Uttar Pradesh one. As of 25 November 2020, Haryana and Karnataka were still in discussion over similar ordinances. In April 2021, the Gujarat Assembly amended the Freedom of Religion Act, 2003, bringing in stringent provisions against forcible conversion through marriage or allurement, with the intention of targeting "love jihad". The Karnataka state cabinet also approved an anti-conversion ‘love jihad’ bill, making it a law in December 2021. The Congress-led government scrapped the law in June 2023.

While campaigning for the 2021 Kerala Legislative Assembly election and the 2021 Assam Legislative Assembly election, the BJP promised that if it won the elections, it would enact a law that would ban "love jihad" in these states.

== Reliance on tropes ==
The conspiracy theory has been noted for its similarities to other historic hate campaigns and Western Islamophobia. It features Orientalist portrayals of Muslims as barbaric and hypersexual, and carries the paternalistic and patriarchal notions that Hindu women are passive and victimised, while "any possibility of women exercising their legitimate right to love and their right to choice is ignored". It has consequently been the cause of vigilante assaults, murders, and other violent incidents, including the 2013 Muzaffarnagar riots.

== Official investigations ==
=== India ===
In August 2017, the National Investigation Agency (NIA) stated that it had found a common "mentor" in some love jihad cases, "a woman associated with the radical group Popular Front of India", in August 2017. According to a later article in The Economist, "Repeated police investigations have failed to find evidence of any organised plan of conversion. Reporters have repeatedly exposed claims of 'love jihad' as at best fevered fantasies and at worst, deliberate election-time inventions". According to the same report, the common theme regarding many claims of "love jihad" has been the frenzied objection to an interfaith marriage while "Indian law erects no barriers to marriages between faiths, or against conversion by willing and informed consent. Yet the idea still sticks, even when the supposed 'victims' dismiss it as nonsense".

In 2022, the Observer Research Foundation and Indian government stated that no more than 100-200 Indians had joined Islamic State, a figure so low that one researcher remarked that "academics and experts often ask the question ‘What had prevented Indian Muslims from joining the Islamic State?'".

==== Karnataka ====
In October 2009, the Karnataka government announced its intention to counter "love jihad", which "appeared to be a serious issue". A week after the announcement, the government ordered a probe into the situation by the CID to determine if an organised effort existed to convert these girls and, if so, by whom it was being funded. One woman, whose conversion to Islam came under scrutiny as a result of the probe, was temporarily ordered to the custody of her parents, but eventually was permitted to return to her new husband after she appeared in court, denying pressure to convert. In April 2010, police used the term to characterize the alleged kidnapping, forced conversion and marriage of a 17-year-old college girl in Mysore.

In late 2009, The Karnataka CID (Criminal Investigation Department) reported that although it was continuing to investigate, it had found no evidence that a "love jihad" existed. In late 2009, Director general of police Jacob Punnoose reported that although the investigation would continue, there was no evidence of any organised attempt by any group or individual using men "feigning love" to lure women to convert to Islam. Investigators did indicate that many Hindu girls had converted to Islam of their own will. In early 2010, the State Government reported to the Karnataka High Court that, although many young Hindu women had converted to Islam, there was no organised attempt to convince them to do so.

==== Kerala ====
According to The Indian Express, Kerala High Court Justice K. T. Sankaran's conclusion that "such incidents under the pretext of love were rampant in certain parts of the state" ran contrary to Central and state government reports. A petition was also put before Sankaran to prevent the use of the terms "love jihad" and "romeo jihad", but Sankaran declined to overrule an earlier decision not to restrain media usage. Subsequently, the High Court stayed further police investigation, both because no organised efforts had been disclosed by police probes and because the investigation was specifically targeted against a single community.

Following the launching of a poster campaign in Thiruvananthapuram, Kerala, purportedly by the organisation Shri Ram Sena, state police began investigating the presence of that organisation in the area. In late October 2009, police addressed the question of "love jihad" itself, indicating that while they had not located an organisation called "Love Jihad", "there are reasons to suspect 'concentrated attempts' to persuade girls to convert to Islam after they fall in love with Muslim boys". In November 2009, director general of police Jacob Punnoose stated there was no organisation whose members lured girls in Kerala by feigning love with the intention of converting. He told the Kerala High Court that three out of 18 reports he received questioned the tendency. However, in absence of solid proof, the investigations were still continuing. In December 2009, Justice K.T. Sankaran, who had refused to accept Punnoose's report, concluded from a case diary that there were indications of forceful conversions and stated it was clear from police reports there was a "concerted effort" to convert women with "blessings of some outfits". The court, while hearing the bail plea of two individuals accused in "love jihad" cases, stated that there had been 3000–4000 such conversions in the past four years. The Kerala High Court in December 2009 stayed investigations in the case, granting relief to the two accused, though it criticised the police investigation. The investigation was closed by Justice M. Sasidharan Nambiar following Punnoose's statements that no conclusive evidence could be found for the existence of "love jihad".

On 9 December 2009, Justice K T Sankaran weighed in on the matter while hearing bail for a Muslim youth arrested for allegedly forcibly converting two female students. According to Sankaran, police reports revealed the "blessings of some outfits" for a "concerted" effort for religious conversions, some 3,000 to 4,000 incidences of which had taken place after love affairs within a four-year period. Sankaran "found indications of 'forceful' religious conversions under the garb of 'love'", suggesting that "such 'deceptive' acts" might require legislative intervention to prevent them.

In January 2012, Kerala police declared that "love jihad" was "[a] campaign with no substance", bringing legal proceedings instead against the website hindujagruti.org for "spreading religious hatred and false propaganda". Subsequently, a case was initiated against the hindujagruti website, where counterfeit posters of Muslim organisations offering money to Muslim youths for luring and trapping women were found.

In 2017, after the Kerala High Court had ruled that a marriage of a Hindu woman to a Muslim man was invalid on the basis of"'love jihad", and an appeal was filed in the Supreme Court of India by the Muslim husband. The court, based on the "unbiased and independent" evidence it requested from the National Investigation Agency (NIA), instructed the NIA to investigate all similar cases to establish whether there was any "love jihad". It allowed the NIA to explore all similar suspicious cases to find whether banned organisations, such as SIMI, were recruiting vulnerable Hindu women as terrorists. The NIA had earlier submitted before the court that the case was not an "isolated" incident and it had detected a pattern emerging in the state, stating that another case involved the same individuals who had previously acted as instigators. In 2018, the NIA concluded its probe, after investigating 11 interfaith marriages in Kerala without finding proof of coercion, and an NIA official concluded that "we didn't find any prosecutable evidence to bring formal charges against these persons under any of the scheduled offences of the NIA", adding that "Conversion is not a crime in Kerala and also helping these men and women convert is also within the ambit of the constitution of the country".

In 2021, Kerala Chief Minister Pinarayi Vijayan stated that "no complaints or clear information were received regarding forced conversion", and that, of the data available to the ministry, "none of the figures validate the propaganda that girls are being lured into conversion and terrorist organizations".

==== Uttar Pradesh ====
In September 2014, following the resurgence of national attention, Reuters reported that police in Uttar Pradesh had found no credence in the five or six recent allegations of "love jihad" that had been brought before them, with state police chief A.L. Banerjee stating that, "In most cases we found that a Hindu girl and Muslim boy were in love and had married against their parents' will". The police stated that occasional cases of trickery by dishonest men are not evidence of a broader conspiracy.

That same month, the Allahabad High Court gave the government and election commission of Uttar Pradesh ten days to respond to a petition to restrain the use of the word "love jihad" and to take action against Yogi Adityanath.

=== United Kingdom ===
In 2018, a report by the fundamentalist Sikh activist organisation, Sikh Youth UK, entitled "The Religiously Aggravated Sexual Exploitation of Young Sikh Women Across the UK" (RASE report) made similar allegations of Muslim men targeting Sikh girls for the purposes of conversion. The report was severely criticised in 2019 by academic researchers and an official British government report, led by two Sikh academics, for false and misleading information. It noted: "The RASE report lacks solid data, methodological transparency and rigour. It is filled instead with sweeping generalisations and poorly substantiated claims around the nature and scale of abuse of Sikh girls and causal factors driving it. It appealed heavily to historical tensions between Sikhs and Muslims and narratives of honour in a way that seemed designed to whip up fear and hate".

Previously, in 2011, Sikh academic Katy Sian had conducted research into the matter, exploring how "forced conversion narratives" arose within the Sikh diaspora in the United Kingdom and why they became so widespread. Sian, who reports that claims of conversion through courtship on campuses are widespread in the UK, says that rather than relying on actual evidence, the Sikh community primarily rest their beliefs on the word of "a friend of a friend" or personal anecdotes. According to Sian, the narrative is similar to 19th-century antisemitic accusations of "white slavery" made in the West against Jews, mirroring the Islamophobia displayed by the modern narrative. Sian expanded on these views in her 2013 book, Mistaken Identities, Forced Conversions, and Postcolonial Formations.

In response to a flurry of sensational news stories on the subject, ten Hindu academics in the UK signed an open letter wherein they argued that claims of British Hindu and Sikh girls being forcefully converted were "part of an arsenal of myths propagated by right-wing Hindu supremacist organisations in India". The Muslim Council of Britain issued a press release pointing out there was a lack of evidence of any forced conversions, and suggested it was an underhanded attempt to smear the British Muslim population.

== "Reverse" love jihad ==
In response to the purported conspiracy of love jihad, affiliates of the Rashtriya Swayamsevak Sangh have stated that they have launched a Reverse Love Jihad campaign to marry Hindu men with Muslim women. Cases related to the campaign were reported from various parts of Uttar Pradesh (U.P.), where rape and abduction of Muslim women have taken place. The perpetrators of these incidents are alleged to be the members of these affiliates who are being rewarded by the affiliates for their activities. Between 2014 and October 2016, 389 cases of underage girls missing or kidnapped were registered by the police in Kushinagar district, and a similar trend was found in a number of districts in eastern Uttar Pradesh, in areas with high communal tensions.

The term Reverse Love Jihad has also been used by the Bajrang Dal to refer to the Love Jihad conspiracy theory where the purported victim is a Hindu man being "lured" to Islam with the prospects of a job and marriage to a Muslim woman.

The Bhagwa Love Trap conspiracy theory, which alleges that Hindu men lure Muslim women into relationships with the intention of converting them to Hinduism, has been popularised on social media.

== See also ==
- The Kerala Story
- Hindutva pseudohistory
- Anti-mosque campaigning in India
- Violence against Muslims in India
- White genocide conspiracy theory
- Great replacement conspiracy theory
- Uttar Pradesh Prohibition of Unlawful Conversion of Religion Act, 2021
