= Gujarat Freedom of Religion Act, 2003 =

Indian law restricting religious conversions

Gujarat Legislature
- Long title: An act to provide for freedom of religion by prohibition of conversion from one religion to another by the use of force or allurement or by fraudulent means and for the matters incidental thereto.
- Citation: Gujarat Act No. 22 of 2003.
- Territorial extent: Gujarat
- Enacted by: Government of Gujarat
- Enacted: 2003
- Assented to: 7 April 2003
- Signed: Governor of Gujarat
- Commenced: 8 April 2003

Related legislation
- Orissa Freedom of Religion Act, 1967; Arunachal Pradesh Freedom of Religion Act, 1978; Himachal Pradesh Freedom of Religion Act 2006; Uttarakhand Freedom of Religion Act, 2018; Madhya Pradesh Freedom of Religion Bill, 2020; Prohibition of Unlawful Religious Conversion Ordinance, 2020

Keywords
- Unlawful Conversion, Unlawful inter-faith marriages, Allurement, Convincing for Conversion, Force, Fraudulent, Coercion, Undue Influence, Minor, Religion, Mass Conversion, Religion Convertor
- Status: In force

The Gujarat Freedom of Religion Act, 2003 requires religious conversions in Gujarat, India, to be approved by a district magistrate.

== Key points ==
The act in itself is alleged to go against the article 25 of the constitution of India (i.e. Right to freedom of religion) in addition to the constitutional right to freedom of speech and expression and to gather peacefully. The parts of it described are as below:

"(1) Whoever converts any person from one religion to another either by performing any ceremony by himself for such conversion as a religious priest or takes part directly or indirectly in such ceremony shall take prior permission for such proposed conversion from the District Magistrate concerned by applying in such form as may be prescribed by rules. (2) The person who is converted shall send an intimation to the District Magistrate of the District concerned in which the ceremony has taken place of the fact of such conversion within such period and in such form as may be prescribed by rules. (3) Whoever fails, without sufficient cause, to comply with the provisions of sub-sections (1) and (2) shall be punished with imprisonment for a term, which may extend to one year or with fine which may extend to rupees one thousand or with both."

The above clauses prevent common people from gathering peacefully at any private function, and also attending the function requires a prior permission from the Magistrate.

From 2011 to 2016, 94.4% of the applications for religious conversion in Gujarat were from Hinduism to another religion, and approximately half of the applications were declined by the state.

== Supreme Court of India's opinion ==
In 2005, the Supreme Court of India declined to issue a writ of mandamus to grant Jains the status of a religious minority throughout India, and left it to the individual states to decide on the minority status of the Jain religion.

However, the Supreme Court had recently observed that "The Jain Religion is indisputably not a part of Hindu Religion".

== Gujarat Freedom of Religion (Amendment) Bill 2006 ==
In order to regulate religious conversions, the Gujarat government is proposing an amendment that will group Jainism and Buddhism along with Hinduism, and thus the adoption of any faith within the group will not be considered a conversion. The bill was passed by voice vote in the Gujarat assembly on 29 September 2006.

All India Digambar Jain Mahasabha opposed the decision on 20 September 2006. Their leader stated, "Any government, as per their convenience and agenda cannot afford to curb our right of a religious identity".

Bhartiya Dharma Rakshak Sena (BDRS), a small organisation said to be run by Jains, maintains that all religions in India are a part of Hinduism, "which is not a religion but a culture." In a press release, on 22 September 2006, Jasmin Shah, Piyush Jain and Abhay Shah of BDRS stated that the controversy is being promoted by forces who want to weaken Hinduism by creating minorities. They state that "Jainism is independent of Vedic religion, known as 'Hinduism'". The BDRS members claimed that there four sub-sects in Jainism, out of which one, the Digambara sect, is demanding a minority status.

On 3 October 2006 the predominant Jain sect in Gujarat, the Shwetambar Murtipujak Jain Sangh, held a meeting with state's solicitor-general to assert that Jainism is a distinct religion and not a Hindu denomination. Shrenik Shah, Gujarat's leading industrialist and president of the All India Shwetambar Murtipujak Jain Sangh, said that they had held a meeting with Gujarat's solicitor-general and expressed their view to recognise Jainism as a distinct religion. "We are not primarily concerned with the conversion aspect of the bill. But we have asserted our view that Jainism is a distinct religion," said Shah

The bill was withdrawn in March 2008.

== Gujarat Freedom of Religion (Amendment) Bill, 2021 ==
The Gujarat Legislative Assembly amended the Freedom of Religion Act to penalizes forcible or fraudulent religious conversion by marriage.

The law made provisions for 3–10 years in jail and a fine of up to ₹500,000 if the accused is found guilty. The amendments a 2003 was sought to curb the emerging trend in which women were being lured to marriage for the purpose of religious conversion.

The bill was passed by the assembly on 14 June 2021
