= Erappungal Abubacker =

Indian politician

E. Abubacker
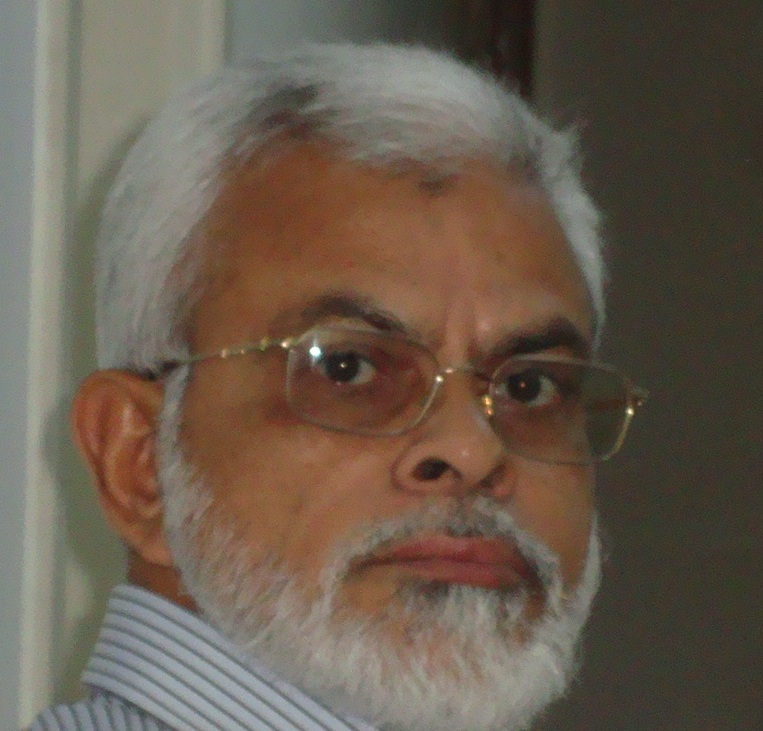

Personal details
- Born: 31 May 1952 (age 73) Koduvally, Kozhikode, Kerala, India
- Party: Social Democratic Party of India

Erappungal Abubacker (born 31 May 1952) is an Indian politician and a founding member of the Social Democratic Party of India (SDPI). He also founded the National Development Front (NDF) He was also the chairman of the now banned Popular Front of India and Rehab India Foundation. He was the former state president of the Students Islamic Movement of India (1982); founder Member of All India Muslim Personal Law Board; Managing Editor, Thejas Daily News Paper (2006), Editor, India Next Hindi Magazine.

On 22 September 2022, Abubacker was one of the first PFI leaders to be arrested by the NIA in their first nationwide crackdown against the group.

In November 2022, Abubacker sought an interim bail on medical grounds as he was suffering from cancer and Parkinson's disease. The High court directed the medical superintendent of Tihar jail to provide treatment to Abubacker in AIIMS Delhi. In December 2022, Abubacker had requested the Delhi High court for a house arrest on medical ground but was rejected. In December 2022, the NIA reported to the high court that Abubacker's condition was "absolutely fine".
