= Marad massacre =

2003 killing of Hindus in Marad, Kerala, India

- 2003 Marad massacre Marad Beach massacre
- Part of religious violence in India
- Location: 11.20745°N 75.78706°E; Marad Beach, Kozhikode district, Kerala, India
- Date: May 2, 2003; 23 years ago
- Attack type: Massacre
- Deaths: 9, including 1 perpetrator
- Perpetrators: NDF; PFI; IUML
- Motive: Revenge and religious persecution

The Marad massacre primarily refers to the 2003 murders of eight (8) Hindu fishermen by Islamic extremists, one of whom was also killed in the affray. A judicial commission that investigated the incident concluded leaders of the Indian Union Muslim League (IUML) were directly involved in both the conspiracy and the massacre. The commission decided the 2003 incident was "a clear communal conspiracy, with Muslim fundamentalist organisations involved". The commission could not find evidence to support the involvement of foreign organisations. The attackers threw bombs with the intention of inflicting more deaths but the bombs did not explode. In 2009, the courts convicted and sentenced 62 Muslim defendants to life imprisonment for committing the massacre.

== January 2002 riots and killings ==
Marad massacre
- Marad Beach killings Part of religious violence in India
- Date: January 4, 2002; 24 years ago
- Location: Marad Beach, Kozhikode district, Kerala; 11.20745°N 75.78706°E
- Caused by: Religious conflict among Hindus and Muslims
- Goals: Religious conflict

Parties
Hindutva	Communists	Islamists
RSS	CPIM	PFI
BJP	–	IUML

Casualties and losses
	2 Hindus	3 Muslims
- 2002 Marad beach killings

A year before the massacre, a 2002 incident led to five deaths. Two Hindus and Three Muslims were killed in Kerala when scuffles that began as a trivial altercation over drinking water at a public tap became violent. Out of 393 people arrested, more than 60 were members of the Indian Union Muslim League who were sentenced to life imprisonment. It is believed the events of 2002 played a role in the following year's massacre.

On 3 and 4 January 2002, at Marad Beach, Kozhikode, Kerala, scuffles between two groups that began as a trivial altercation over drinking water at a public tap descended into violence. Three Hindus and two Muslims were killed. Police were present who watched the incident but failed to capture the criminals. Out of 393 people arrested, 213 were members of Bhartiya Janata Party (BJP), 86 were from the Indian Union Muslim League (IUML), 78 were from the Communist Party of India (Marxist) (CPI(M)) and the Communist Party of India (CPI), one was from the Indian National League (INL) and one was from the National Development Front (NDF; which has since been renamed the Popular Front of India). Government troops were later sent to patrol the area.

== May 2003 massacre ==
On 2 May 2003, in the early evening, eight Hindus were hacked to death by a Muslim mob on the beach after reeling in their day's catch. One of the attackers, Mohammed Ashker, was accidentally killed during the incident by his companions. Several of the Muslims fled to a local Juma Masjid, hiding in their blood-stained clothes and carrying weapons. Local Muslim women surrounded the mosque, creating a human chain or barricade which initially obstructed police from entering the premises.

Initial investigation report of the Crime Branch Inspector General of Police Mahesh Kumar Singhla indicated the NDF was responsible for the killings. Government troops later unearthed a large cache of weapons, including 17 bombs. The police commissioner TK Vinod Kumar stated: "It was an operation carried out by a well-knit organization. It was a quick and sudden attack which was over in 10 minutes. The attack came from a particular community."

== Aftermath and exodus of residents ==
The Marad massacre created a sense of insecurity for the local inhabitants that continues. The police, judiciary, and legislature prolonged the case and were unable to bring the perpetrators of the 2002 and 2003 Marad killings to justice until 2008 despite continuous requests from the local community and the bereaved. The judiciary did not convict all 134 defendants.

== Inquiry commission ==
The killings provoked public anger against the apparently apathetic approach of the investigating agency and the growth of religious fundamentalism in Kerala. There were persistent demands for a judicial enquiry into the incidents; to effect this, the then-UDF government appointed District and Sessions Judge Thomas P. Joseph to the Commission of Inquiry. Joseph submitted his report in February 2006 and the LDF ministry tabled the report in September 2006. The report said a person known as "F.M." (Finance Minister) had funded the massacre and also accused political parties and government officials, including the District Collector T.O. Sooraj Mohamed. A person named Hilal Mohammed, who was handling the smuggling of counterfeit goods at Calicut Airport, filed a petition demanding a probe into his alleged involvement in the matter.

Both petitions were filed through Advocate S. K. Premraj. During the hearing, Premraj claimed Hilal Mohammed's life was under imminent threat. The role of IUML leader P. P. Modieen Koya and Mayin Haji, then-chairman of Kozhikode Development Authority was highlighted in the report. The commission recommended a further inquiry involving the Central Bureau of Investigation (CBI) regarding the involvement of foreign agencies in the riots.

=== Key findings ===
Key findings of the commission were that patrols and search for weapons by local police were ineffective; the police's attitude to the situation was called "lethargic". (chapter 5, section 37). The damaging of household items in the presence of police was called "unfortunate". (chapter 5, section 42)

=== Main recommendation ===
The commission's main recommendation was a further inquiry involving the Intelligence Bureau (IB), the CBI and the Directorate of Revenue Intelligence into the "larger conspiracy" involving fundamentalist and other forces, and into the source of the explosives and funds the CBCID "failed or refused" to investigate – an act that the commission described as "quite suspicious and disturbing".

=== Responses to commission's report ===
The Home Minister of Kerala had written to the Union Government on 12 September 2006 recommending the CBI probe into the conspiracy behind the riots; the involvement of fundamentalist organisations, their foreign connections and source of funding; and how they succeeded in secretly stockpiling weapons in the village for use in the riots. A.K. Antony, who was the Chief Minister during both incidents, differed on the commission's findings, saying the first round of violence should have been included in the report.

== Convictions and sentencing ==
On 27 December 2008, a special court convicted 63 people in a case relating to the May 2003 communal attack at Marad Beach. Seventy-six others were acquitted due to a lack of evidence. On 15 January 2009: A sessions court in Kozhikode gave life sentences to 62 of 63 convicts in the 2001 Marad case. One convict, who has already served five years in jail, was released.

== Renewed demands for CBI probe ==
On 17 April 2012, Kerala High Court determined that there had been a "deep conspiracy" behind the incident and that police had failed to effectively investigate it. Opposition leader VS Achuthanandan said Chief Minister Oommen Chandy had tried to sabotage the Marad massacre case. BJP and Hindu Aikya Vedi and CPI(M)'s State secretariat member Elamaram Kareem also called for a probe by the Central agency. Achuthanandan said Chandy's Congress-led United Democratic Front, which was in coalition with the IUML, of having intervened in the case. Kerala BJP president V. Muraleedharan wanted to initiate a case against senior Muslim League leader MC Mayin Haji, who had prior knowledge of massacre plan, according to the Judicial Commission.

In 2016, CBI filed a fresh First Information Report with Muslim League leaders included in the list of accused. In November 2021, the special additional court sentenced two people to double-life jail terms.

== See also ==
- National Development Front
- Popular Front of India
- List of massacres in India
