= Manitha Neethi Pasarai =

Muslim organization in Tamil Nadu, India

MNP protest against the human rights violations of Tamil Nadu police in India.

Manitha Neethi Pasarai (MNP) is a Muslim organisation in Tamil Nadu, India which was founded by the well-known Muslim journalist M. Ghulam Mohamed. It has its stated objective as to "work on issues related to minorities and backward communities in Tamil Nadu". It is a registered Society under the Tamil Nadu Registration Societies Act with Reg.No.51 of 2001. The MNP operates the Islam-centered Tamil magazine Vidiyal Velli -- the largest Muslim journal with a circulation of 23,000. that highlights various aspects of Islam. In 2007 it became part of the Islamic Extremist organisation Popular Front of India (PFI, offshoot of the Students Islamic Movement of India which is itself associated with the Indian Mujahideen) — an umbrella organisation with two other entities in it: the Karnataka For Dignity (KFD), Tamil Nadu, and National Development Front (NDF).
