= National Political Conference =

The National Political Conference was held on 13–15 February 2009 at Kozhikode in Kerala. It was organized by several social organizations in India such as the Lilong Social Forum, the Manitha Neethi Pasare, the Karnataka Forum for Dignity and the Popular Front of India. This conference later led to the formation of a new political party called the Social Democratic Party of India.

== Introduction ==
Even after 60 years of independence, the minority and dalits are getting weaker in the society. Different organisations working on this grounds around the nation decided to unite on a common platform with a slogan Power to people. The conference aims to guide minorities of all sectors and other backward communities towards a new positive political thinking to ensure adequate representation for them at power centers. Hundreds of thousand of people participated in the event from different sectors of the country. In this conference, 18 organizations from different locations of the nation decide to work together and decided to work on common issues like lack Political Empowerment of dalits and Muslim minorities, hunger and poverty. Different state-level organizations like Lilong Social Forum from Manipur has participated in the Conference and had conducted rallies and conferences in the state.

National Political Conference - public meet inauguration by Ibrahim Rasool South Africa advicer to President of South Africa

== Creation of new Political Party ==
A new political party called SDPI formed as a result of this conference. This party has a presence in different states of India, and has started participating in elections.

== Participations & sessions ==
A total of eleven session were arranged for three days in different facilities in Kozhikode. There were different sessions for political activists, women, human rights defenders, students, scholars and media persons will be held. A non-resident Indian meet was also conducted to share the issues of Pravasis. The last day of the conference was on 15 February with a grand public meeting at the Kozhikode beach in which more than 200,000 of people are participated.

== See also ==
- Popular Front of India
- Indian Politics
