= Karnataka Forum for Dignity =

Islamist organization in India

Karnataka Forum for Dignity (KFD) was an Islamist organization in the Indian state of Karnataka. Formed in the year 2001, it was active in the coastal city of Mangalore and in the districts of Udupi, Dakshina Kannada, Kodagu of Karnataka state and in Kasargod district of Kerala state. The group merged with Kerala-based extremist Islamist organisation Popular Front of India (PFI) on 22 November 2006.

It is considered an offshoot of the Students Islamic Movement of India (SIMI, the affiliate of the Indian Mujahideen). The Karnataka Police were probing the involvement of the group in the 2009 Mysuru communal violence and 2005 Indian Institute of Science shooting in Bangalore. The group is also accused of extorting money and many of its members are accused in the sensational kidnap and murder of two boys from SBRR Mahajana College, Mysore.

In 2015, the Siddaramaiah cabinet decided to withdraw criminal cases against 1,600 activists of KFD and Popular Front of India for rioting. The opposition BJP accused the chief minister of turning a blind eye to the acts of violence by activists belonging to the forum and the PFI in Hassan, Shivamogga and Mysuru, and blamed these organisations of being seeded by the Inter-Services Intelligence and Taliban. The government was asked to reconsider its decision and warned the withdrawal of cases would result in moral policing, communal activities and other violent anti-social activities in the state.

== See also ==
- Indian Mujahideen
- Yasin Bhatkal
- List of organisations banned by the Government of India
- Popular Front of India
- National Political Conference
