= Beypore =

- Suburb
- Beypore Beach

- Location in Kerala, India Beypore (India)
- Coordinates: 11°10′24.892″N 75°48′14.21″E
- Country: India
- State: Kerala
- District: Kozhikode

Government
  - Body: Kozhikode Municipal Corporation

Area
  - Total: 10.41 km^{2} (4.02 sq mi)
- Elevation: 1 m (3.3 ft)

Population (2011)
  - Total: 69,752
  - Density: 6,700/km^{2} (17,350/sq mi)

Languages
  - Official: Malayalam, English
- Time zone: UTC+5:30 (IST)
- PIN: 673015
- Vehicle registration: KL-85

Beypore or Beypur (Malayalam: [beːpːuːr], formerly Beypoor) is a port town in Kozhikode district in the state of Kerala, India. It is located opposite to Chaliyam, the estuary (Azhimukham in Malayalam) where the river Chaliyar empties into the Arabian Sea. Beypore is part of Kozhikode Municipal Corporation and it is located 10 km (6.2 mi) south of Kozhikode city.

The town was formerly known as Vaypura or Vadaparappanad and also as Beydary. Tipu Sultan, ruler of Mysore, named the town Sultan Pattanam. There is a marina and a beach, while Beypore port is one of the oldest ports in Kerala, which historically traded with the Middle East. Beypore is noted for building wooden ships, known as dhows or urus in the Malayalam language. These ships were usually bought by Arab merchants for trading and fishing but are now used as tourist ships. According to Captain Iwata, founder member of the Association of Sumerian Ships in Japan, Sumerian ships might have been built in Beypore. There is evidence to prove that Beypore had direct trade links with Mesopotamia and was a prominent link on the maritime silk route. The first railway line of Kerala was laid in 1861 from Tirur to Beypore (Chaliyam), passing through Tanur, Parappanangadi, Vallikkunnu, and Kadalundi.

== Etymology ==
The name Beypore is believed to come from a combination of the Malayalam word vay (meaning "mouth," "inlet," or "opening" of a river) and the Sanskrit word pur or pattanam (meaning "town" or "city"), literally translating to "port town at the river mouth". This name might have been acsribed due to the merging of Chaliyar river and the Arabian Sea at Beypore.

== History ==
Names, routes and locations of the Periplus of the Erythraean Sea (1st century CE)

The ancient trading port of Tyndis is often identified with Kadalundi-Chaliyam-Beypore region. Tyndis was a major center of trade, next only to Muziris, between the Cheras and the Roman Empire. Pliny the Elder (1st century CE) states that the port of Tyndis was located at the northwestern border of Keprobotos (Chera dynasty). The North Malabar region, which lies north of the port at Tyndis, was ruled by the kingdom of Ezhimala during Sangam period. According to the Periplus of the Erythraean Sea, a region known as Limyrike began at Naura and Tyndis. However the Ptolemy mentions only Tyndis as the Limyrike's starting point. The region probably ended at Kanyakumari; it thus roughly corresponds to the present-day Malabar Coast. The value of Rome's annual trade with the region was estimated at around 50,000,000 sesterces. Pliny the Elder mentioned that Limyrike was prone by pirates. The Cosmas Indicopleustes mentioned that the Limyrike was a source of peppers.

According to the Legend of Cheraman Perumals, the first Indian mosque was built in 624 AD at Kodungallur with the mandate of the last the ruler (the Cheraman Perumal) of Chera dynasty, who converted to Islam during the lifetime of Muhammad (c. 570–632). According to Qissat Shakarwati Farmad, the Masjids at Kodungallur, Kollam, Madayi, Barkur, Mangalore, Kasaragod, Kannur, Dharmadam, Panthalayini, and Chaliyam (just opposite to Beypore), were built during the era of Malik Dinar, and they are among the oldest Masjids in the Indian subcontinent. It is believed that Malik Dinar died at Thalangara in Kasaragod town.

In the medieval period, Beypore was ruled by four Kovilakams - Karippa Puthiyakovilakam, Manayat Kovilakam, Nediyaal Kovilakam and Panagad Kovilakam - all belonging to the Beypore branch of the Parappanad family. The Parappanad royal family is related to the more famous Travancore royal family. Marthanda Varma, the founder of Travancore, belongs to Parappanad royal family. They also had branches at Parappanangadi, Vallikkunnu and Beypore.

Beypore was visited first by Romans and afterwards by Chinese, Syrians, Arabs and in recent centuries by Europeans for trade. Beypore has a long history of being a centre for shipbuilding since the first century AD, and it was further expanded under the East India Company during the early nineteenth century. The Indian Ocean trade started from ancient times and strengthened during the medieval times. While in the old days Malabar directly traded with the Greeks and Romans, it concentrated on exchanges with the Middle Eastern ports in the medieval times. This exchange of goods resulted also in transfer of people from their abodes. While it is mentioned that Malabaris were found along African ports and even Egypt's, it was mostly Arabs who migrated to the Malabar coasts, mainly to administer, control and conduct the trade with their brethren in Yemen, Basra in Iraq and Egyptian ports. Beypore was virtually a free port with only an export import duty imposed by the ruling Zamorins. The intermediaries between the Arabs and the Nairs were the Mappilas (themselves a community started by the intermingling Arab men and local women from ancient times). Also the south east Malay ports sent ships to Malabar for the cloth from Kerala, until British cloth took its place later in the 19th century. It was also a stop over for Hajj pilgrims from south east Asia. The Arab settlers in Malabar even had African slaves during that period.

== Beypore port ==
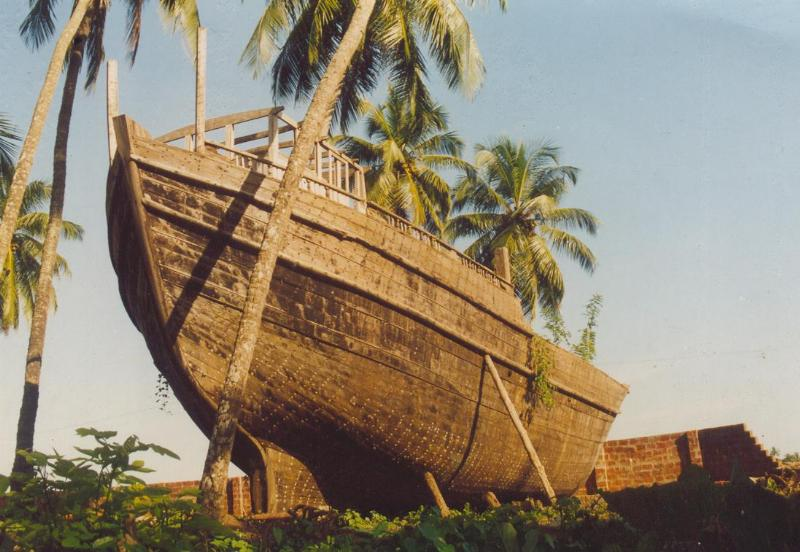
Beypore is world-famous for the ancient design boats called Urus

Beypore port is a sub-port of Kozhikode port, located approximately 10 km (6.2 mi) south of Kozhikode. The land for the port was acquired from Beypore Karippa Puthiyakovilakam in 1963 and 1964. It is an estuarine port, where Beypore river discharges into the Arabian Sea. Beypore is 180 km (110 mi) North of Cochin and 391 km (243 mi) away from Trivandrum. Beypore port is the second biggest port in Kerala after Cochin and currently handles about 100,000 tonnes of cargo and 7500 passengers per annum. The nearest ports are Kochi and Mangalore. The port has a depth of about 5 metres (16 ft) alongside wharf and approach channel. Beypore port is one of the oldest ports in Kerala from where trading was done to the Middle East.

== Uru construction ==
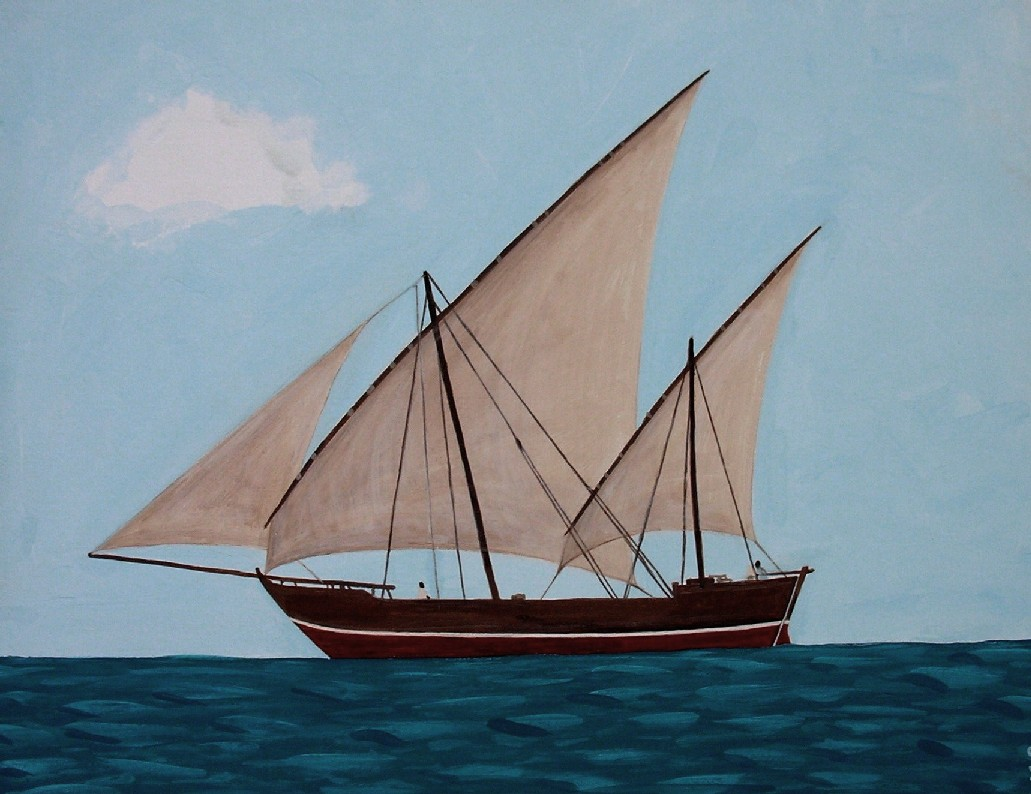
Beypore has a reputation for boat building

The uru, or "Fat Boat", is a generic name for large dhow-type wooden ships made in Beypore. This type of boat has been used by the Arabs since ancient times as trading vessels, and to this day, urus are being manufactured and exported to Arab nations from Beypore. These boats used to be built of several types of wood, the main one being teak. The teak was taken from Nilambur forests in earlier times, but now imported Malaysian teak is used.

== Geography ==
Beypore is located at 11.18°N 75.81°E. It has an average elevation of one metre (3 ft 3 in).

== Travel information ==
By road: Beypore is well connected by road and is just 11 km (6.8 mi) from Kozhikode.

By air: Kozhikode International Airport is located in Karipur and is 23 km (14 mi) from Kozhikode city centre.

By rail: Kozhikode station is 10 km (6.2 mi) away and Feroke is 4 km (2.5 mi) away.

== Demographics ==
As of 2001 India census, Beypore had a population of 66,883. Males constitute 49% of the population and females 51%. Beypore has an average literacy rate of 81%, higher than the national average of 59.5%; with 50% of the males and 50% of females literate. 13% of the population is under 6 years of age.

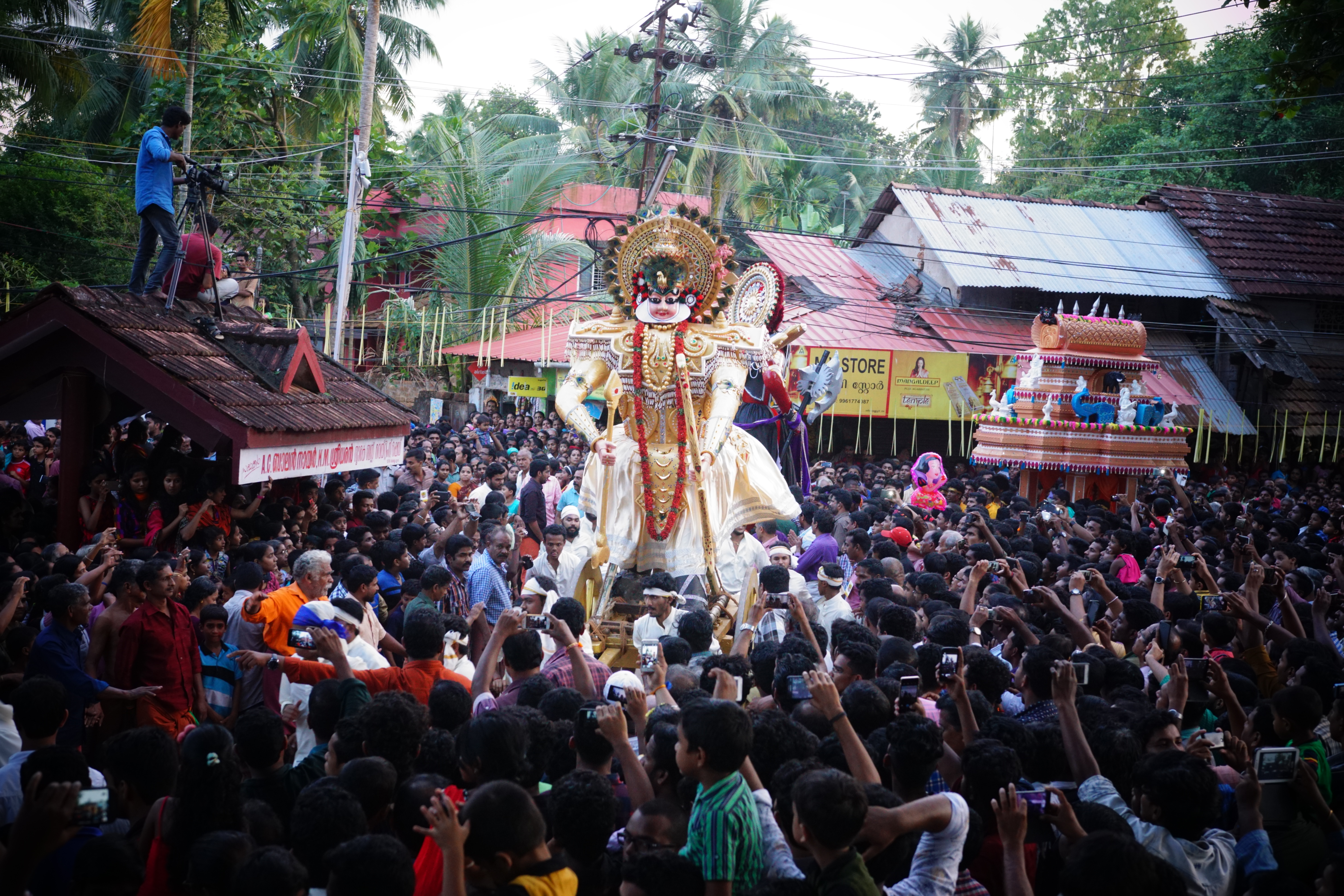
Cheruvannur festival

== Notable residents ==
- Vaikom Muhammad Basheer (1908 – 1994) - He is known as 'Beypore Sultan' due to his contribution to Malayalam literature.
- Mamukkoya - A renowned Malayalam film actor famed in comedy and character roles.

== Notable sites ==
- Pulimuttu - It is the local name of the 1-kilometre-long (0.62 mi) stone pier made of stone stretching in to sea. It is made by piling stones like a pathway to sea.
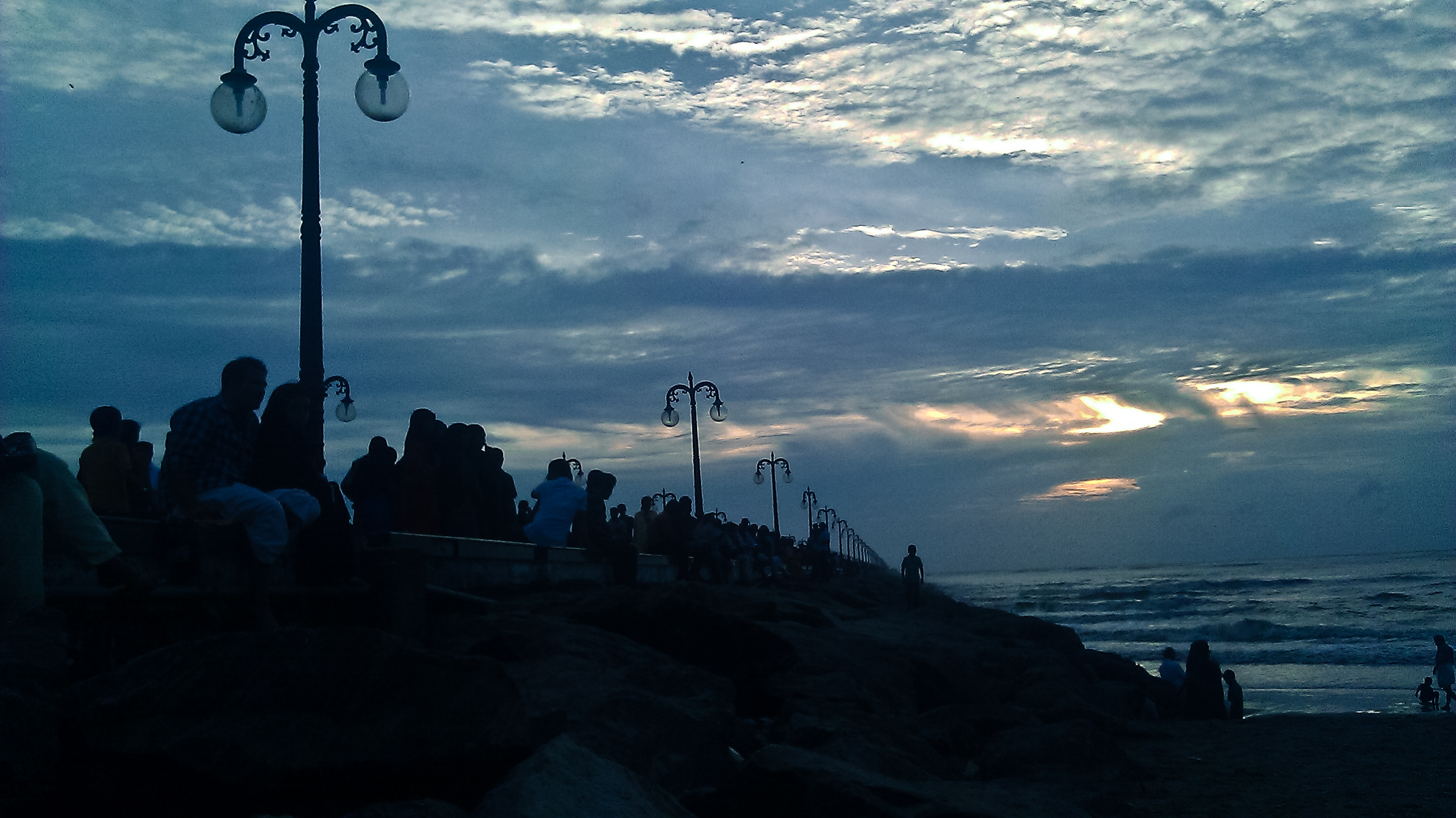
  Stone Pier at Pulimuttu, Beypore
- Beypore Beach
- Beypore Port
- Beypore harbour
- House of Vaikom Muhammad Basheer
- Beypore light house is situated at the south bank of chaliyar.

== Government offices ==
Indian Coast Guard has established its third station in Kerala at Beypore, Coast Guard Station Beypore. It was commissioned on 25 May 2006.

== See also ==
- Feroke
- Kadalundi Bird Sanctuary
- Chaliyar river
- Marad
- Chaliyam

== Image gallery ==
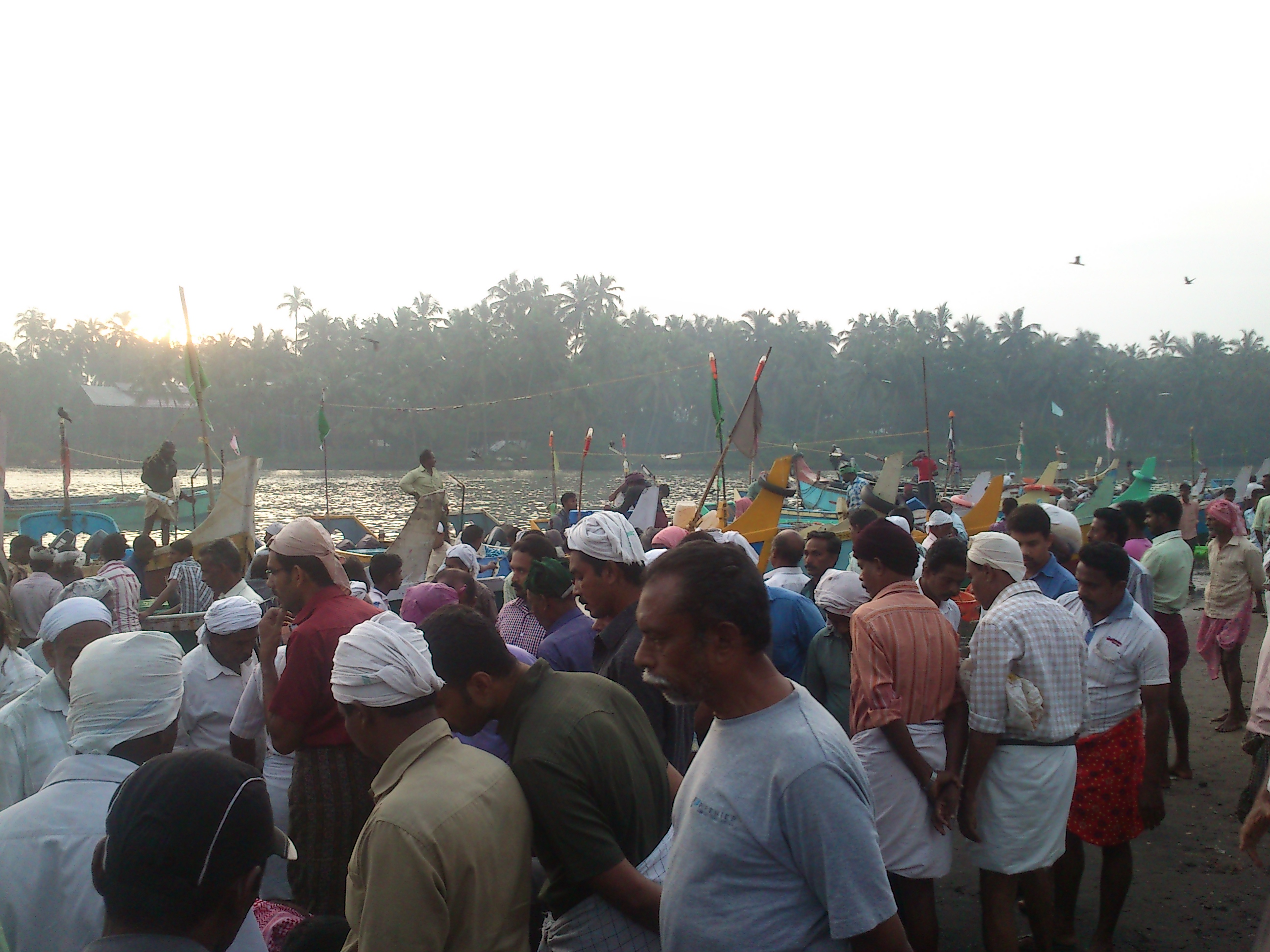
Fishing in Beypore

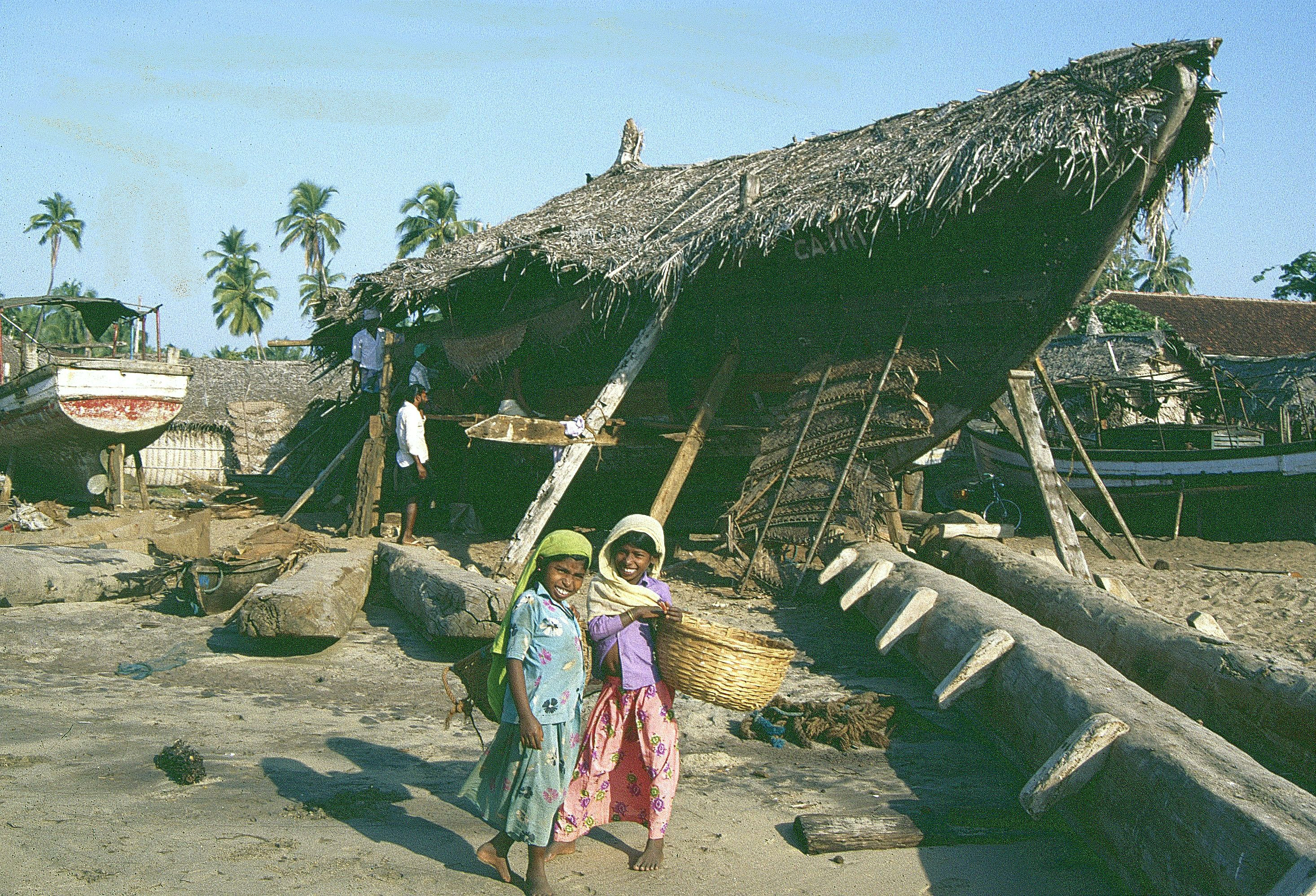
Making boats

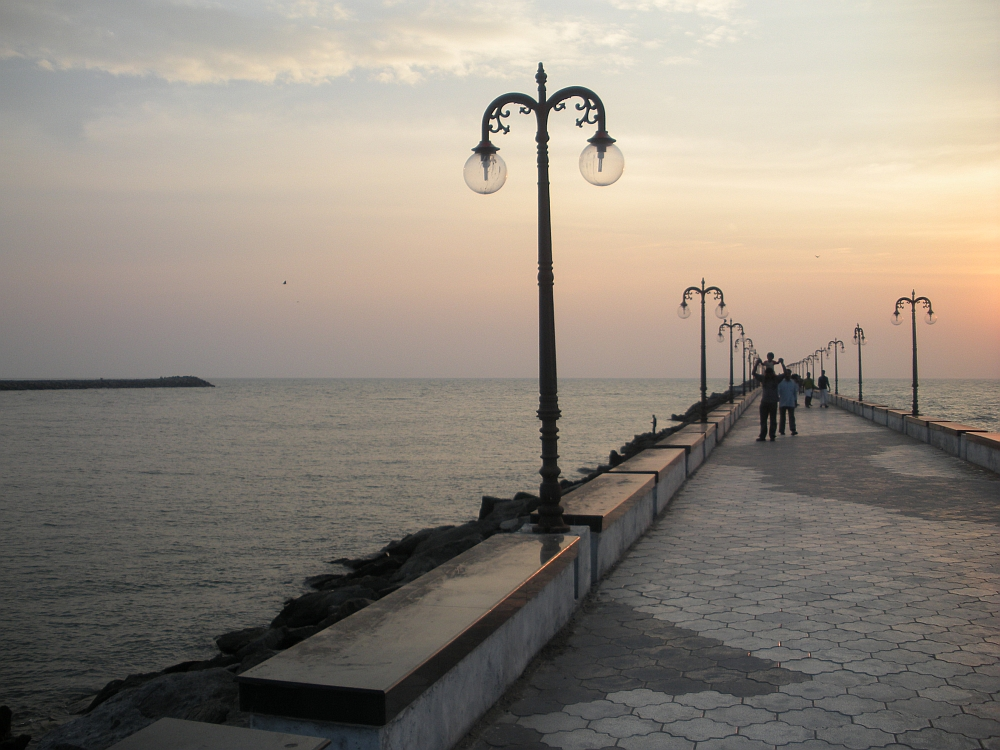
The promenade

Uru building

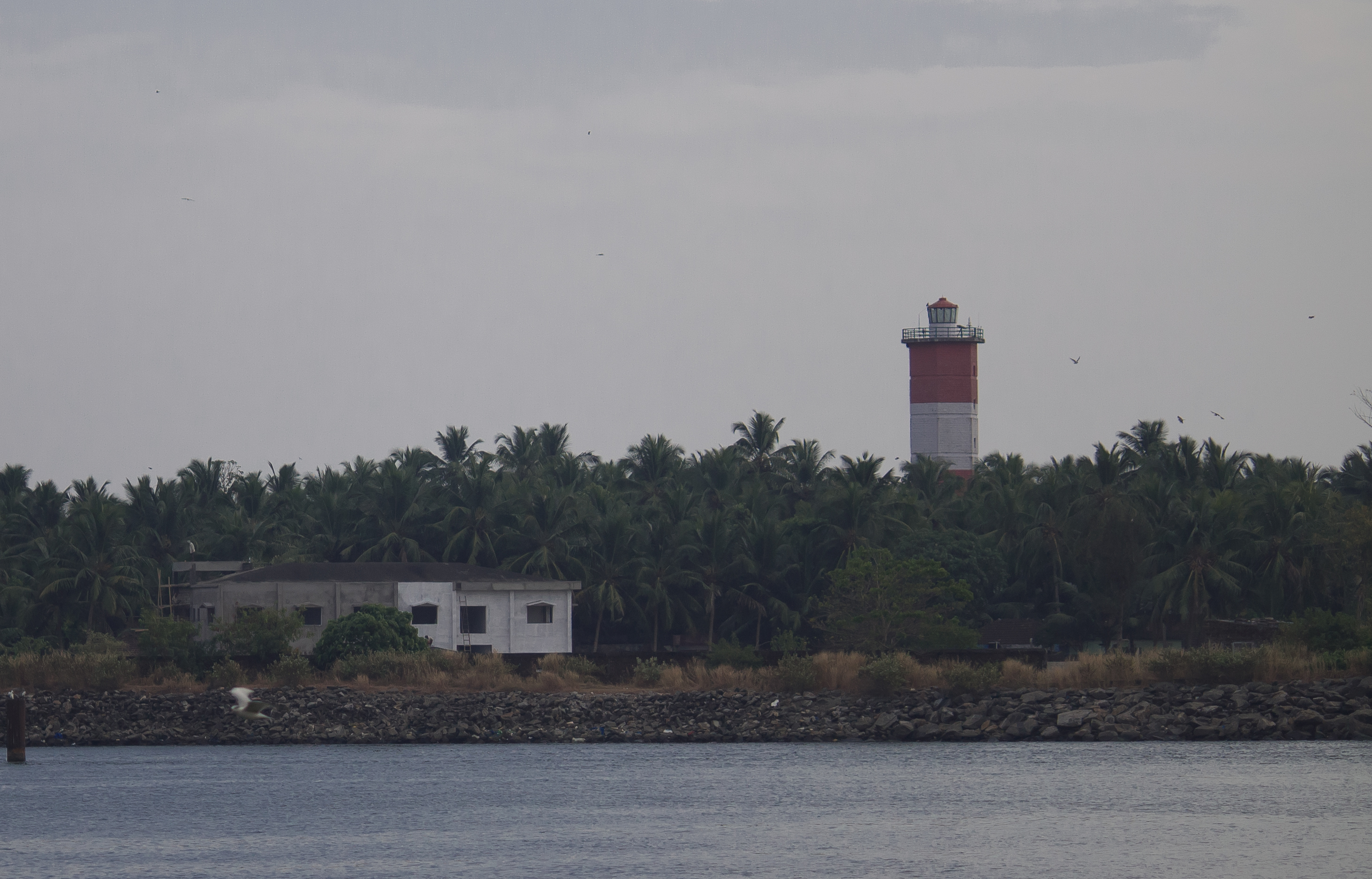
Beypore Lighthouse
