= Marad Beach =

Beach in Kerala, India

Marad Beach is a small fishing village near Kallayi in Kozhikode city in India. The beach is located behind Kallayi railway station.

The Marad Road starts from Kallayi town and passes through Chakkum Kadavu village and Payyanakkal village. Marad and Kayyadithode villages are adjacent to each other.

== History ==
In 2003, eight Hindus and one Muslim were killed in a religiously motivated incident. In 2009, a special court sentenced 62 people to life imprisonment.

== See also ==
- Chalappuram
- Kallayi
- Kozhikode Beach
- Beypore
- Nallalam
