= Citizenship Amendment Act protests in Uttar Pradesh =

2019–2020 protests in Uttar Pradesh in India

- Part of Citizenship Amendment Act protests
- Date: 15 December 2019 – 15 March 2020
- Location: Uttar Pradesh, Delhi, India
- Caused by: Passage of the Citizenship (Amendment) Act, 2019 and the following police intervention at Jamia Milia Islamia
- Goals: Pressurize Government to roll back CAA and not to implement NRC-NPR in the country.
- Methods: Protest, sit-in, demonstrations, civil disobedience, hunger strike, slogan, public lecture, public debate, protest art
- Status: Ended

Lead figures
Non-centralized leadership	

Casualties
- Deaths: 23
- Arrested: 1246
- Detained: 5558

CAA protests in Uttar Pradesh was a protest that began in response to the passage of the Citizenship (Amendment) Act (CAA) in both houses of Parliament on 11 December 2019 and the police intervention against students at Jamia Millia Islamia who were opposing law which gives priority to Hindus, Sikhs, Buddhists, Jains, Parsis and Christians minority residents who migrated from Afghanistan, Bangladesh, or Pakistan in India before 2014, but excludes Muslims, including minority sects who are majority population in these countries. The student activists were also demanding complete roll back of CAA.

The protest were supported by Indian diaspora worldwide generally against the incumbent Bharatiya Janata Party (BJP) government. The protesters also came in support to Major trade unions opposing the government's anti-labour policies and have protested against recent happenings such as the 2020 JNU Attack. The Shaheen Bagh protests has inspired similar Shaheen Bagh-style protests across the country, such as in Gaya, Park Circus, Prayagraj, Mumbai and Bengaluru.

The UP Police claimed that firing wsa initiated by protesters, no cops were behind many deaths in the CAA protests in the state. A fact-finding team comprising students from several prominent universities such as JNU, Jamia Millia Islamia and Banaras Hindu University on Wednesday accused the Uttar Pradesh police of brutality in dealing with anti-Citizenship Amendment Act protests and targeting Muslims.

== Background ==
=== Causes ===
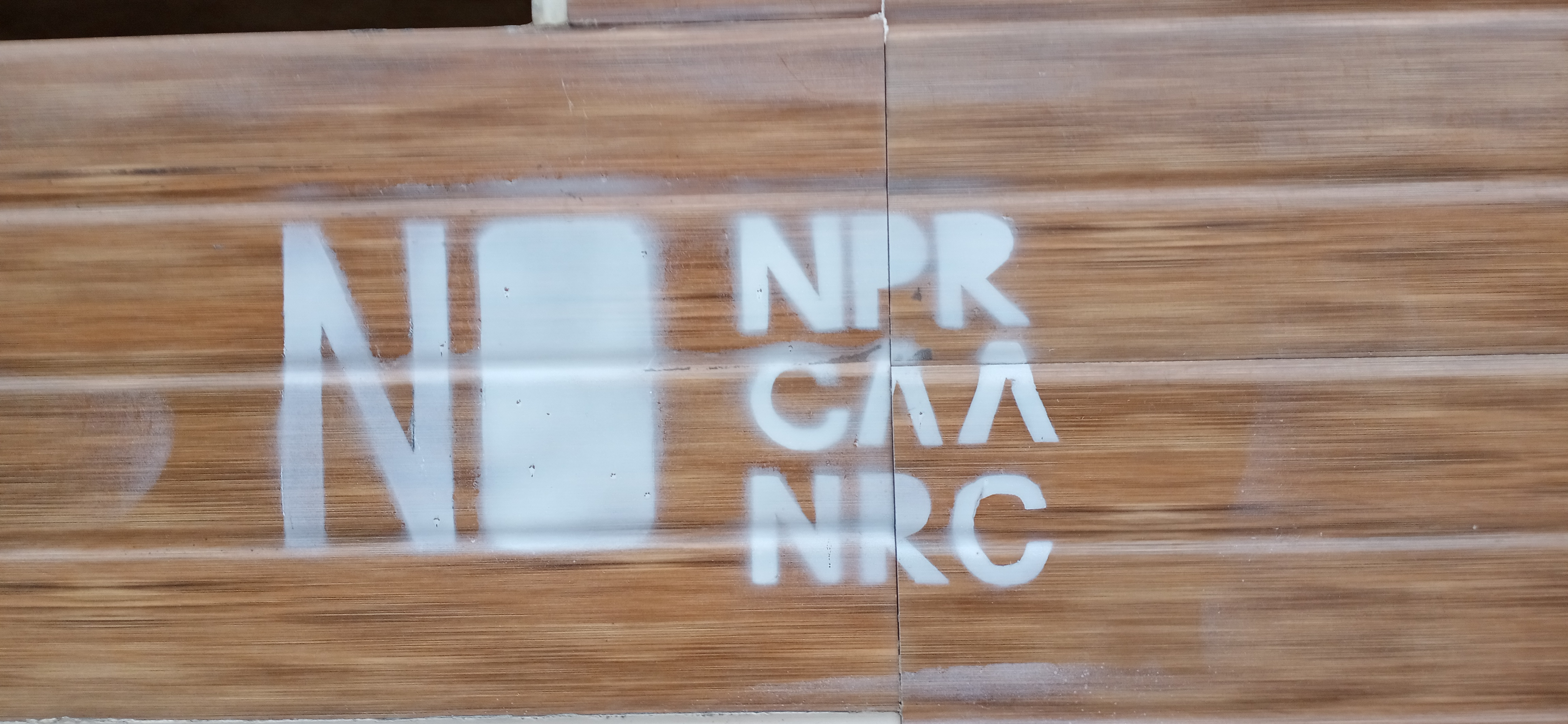
No NPR CAA NRC graffiti at Shaheen Bagh

On 12 December 2019, the Parliament of India passed the Citizenship (Amendment) Act, 2019 (CAA), which amends the Citizenship Act of 1955 to grant a swifter path to Indian citizenship under the assumption of religious persecution to any individual belonging to the specific religious minorities of Hindus, Sikhs, Buddhists, Jains, Parsis and Christians minorities from Afghanistan, Bangladesh and Pakistan, for those who entered India on or before 31 December 2014. However, the Act does not mention Muslims who are majority populations in these countries and does not offer eligibility benefits to Muslim immigrants or immigrants belonging to other religions or from other countries, such as Sri Lankan Tamil refugees, Rohingya Muslim and Hindu refugees from Myanmar, and Buddhist refugees from Tibet. It was also alleged that the National Register of Citizens (NRC), which the government planned to implement for the country in 2021, could have been used to deprive Muslims of Indian citizenship. The NRC was put on hold and hasn't been implemented as of May 2026.

The CAA–NRC issue also ignited protest of the economic crisis and economic disparities that the country is facing. Women's safety, rising cost of commodities, increasing unemployment and poverty have acted as catalysts for the protest. The Indian economy had reportedly witnessed a decreasing growth rate, increasing household debt, inflation, unemployment and economic inequality. The State Bank of India estimated a growth rate of 4.6% for the financial year (FY) 2020, which would be the lowest since the Great Recession where the growth rate had been 3.9%. The unemployment rate of India was reported to have reached a 45-year high of 6.1% in FY 2017–18. The Center for Monitoring Indian Economy stated the unemployment rate to be 8.45% with a rate of 37.48% for the 20–24 age group and 12.81% for the 25–29 age group in October 2019. According to the 2019 report of the Pew Research Center, 393.7 million jobs were in a vulnerable state. Oxfam India data stated that control of the country's wealth by the richest 1% of the population increased from 58% to 73% between 2018 and 2019, while the wealth of the poorest 50% increased by 1%. The WPS-index (Women, Peace and Security index) ranked India at 133 amongst 167 countries in 2019–20.

=== The protest ===
Anti-Citizenship Amendment Act protests in Uttar Pradesh were held in Aligarh, Kanpur, Bareilly, Varanasi and Lucknow. Banaras Hindu University students also protested the police action targeted at the AMU and Jamia students. However, they also held a rally in support of the CAA and NRC. On 19 December, the administration banned public assembly all over the state to prevent further protests in the state. Access to the internet was restricted in Azamgarh district for 2 days, after protest continued for 2 days in the area. In Lucknow, several buses, cars, media vans and motorbikes were torched. A protester named Mohammad Vakil died due to gunshot injuries in the stomach. Uttar Pradesh Chief Minister Yogi Adityanath stated that the authorities would seize the properties of those who indulge in violence in the state.

On 20 December 2019, six protesters are killed in police firing in UP. Arif (25), Zaheer (40), and Moshin (25) from Meerut, while Anas (22) and Sulaiman (26) from Nehtaur area, Bijnor, Uttar Pradesh. Rights activists in Uttar Pradesh, said local policemen were conducting raids on their houses and offices to prevent them from planning fresh demonstrations. According to the Press Trust of India, the death toll from Friday's protests in Uttar Pradesh's 13 districts has risen to 11. Amid police crackdown across Uttar Pradesh over the protests, families in Bijnor's Nehtaur alleged that vandalism by the state police has forced them to flee their homes.

On 21 December 2019, violent protests along with alleged police brutality were reported from several districts across the state. Access to the internet was restricted. The number of fatalities in the state increased to 16. In Rampur, the protesters held a general strike (bandh) while a ban on public assembly was in force in the state. Multiple clashes causing injuries to several people were reported. According to the police, 263 policemen were injured, of which 57 were firearm injuries. NDTV later reported that they could only find one policeman with bullet wound and the police did not share the list of 57 policemen with bullet injuries. Private property such as two-wheelers and a car were set ablaze. In Kanpur, a police post was burned during the clashes. Police arrested 705 people in the state, with 102 arrested for making allegedly objectionable remarks or social media posts. According to the UP Police, as of 21 December, a total of 218 people had been arrested in Lucknow.

On 22 December 2019, large number of police personnel were deployed in several districts in Uttar Pradesh, including Lucknow, Meerut, Aligarh, Saharanpur and Muzaffarnagar. Police cases were registered against 31 leaders of the Samajwadi Party and 150 party workers in Banda, Uttar Pradesh for violating the ban on public assembly. The United States warned its citizens to be cautious if they were travelling in the state. Disciplinary actions were reported from educational institutions, the actions included suspension and expulsion of teachers and students participating in protests.

On 24 December, Uttar Pradesh Police stated that 21,500 people were charged in 15 FIRs for violent incidents in Kanpur. In Muzaffarnagar the government, sealed 67 shops. Chief Minister, Adityanath had threatened the protesters that his government would auction the properties of the rioters to recover the losses due to the damage made to the property. Several CCTV videos were released from the public in Muzaffarnagar that showed Police personnel vandalizing property, damaging cars and shops, even though the government blamed the protesters for the damage.

On 26 December, In Sambhal, UP, the government sent notices to 26 people for their alleged involvement in damaging properties during protests and asked them to explain their position or pay for the loss due to damage of property. The losses to the property were assessed to be ₹11.66 lakh (US$12,000). Earlier, on 22 December, the UP government had created a panel to assess the damage to the property and to recover the losses by seizing the property of the alleged protesters. The social activists accused the government of intimidating the protesters.

On 28 December, Indian Express reported that with 19 killed and 1,246 people arrested based on 372 FIRs lodged in the state, UP was the worst affected state with the biggest police crackdown in India. UP Police and paramilitary forces also used security drones to monitor people and to prevent people from gathering to protest. In Meerut, a police officer was seen on video telling Muslim protesters to "Go to Pakistan". Even though the official figure of number of deaths so far in UP was 19, opposition parties claimed that the actual figure was higher. The UP police had maintained that the deaths of protesters were not the result of police firing, but later on they admitted that some deaths were indeed caused by the police but attributed those incidents to shots fired in self defence.

The UP government asked the Union Home Minister, to ban the radical Islamic organisation Popular Front of India (PFI) alleging that it was involved in violence during the protests in the state.

On 17 January in Lucknow, around 500 women along with their children started a sit in protest at 2 pm near the Clock Tower.(subscription required) The police tried to convince them to end the protest but the protesters refused to move. In the evening, the riot police did a flag march in the grounds. The police restricted the entry of male protesters. The police claimed that the women protesters had requested this to prevent others from sabotaging the demonstration. On the night of 18 January, Uttar Pradesh police cracked down on the CAA protesters and snatched their blankets, utensils and food items. The video of policemen carrying away the blankets was recorded and shared on social media. The conduct of UP police was criticized why the users and the phrase "KAMBALCHOR_UPPOLICE" (blanket thief UP Police) became the top trend on Twitter in India. The police responded saying that they had confiscated the blankets following due procedure. The protesters alleged that police also cut the electricity connection to the ground, locked the public toilet nearby and poured water on the bonfire in the winter night. The police had issued a prohibition on assembly in Lucknow, and stated that they will prosecute the protesters for violating it. On 21 January, police registered cases against 160 women for violation of the ban on assembly and protesting against CAA in Lucknow.

Despite ban on assembly in Lucknow on 21 January, Home Minister Amit Shah was allowed by the administration to address a pro CAA public rally. Amit Shah said that the protesters can continue protesting but the government would not revoke the CAA. On 21 January, in a unique way of protesting, more than a hundred women protesters at Khureji Khas in Delhi released 10,000 gas filled black coloured balloons with the message "No CAA NPR NRC".

==== Aligarh Muslim University ====
On 15 December, protests against CAA were held outside the campus of the Aligarh Muslim University. On the evening of 15 December, police officers forcefully entered the campus of the University and assaulted the students. At least 60 students were injured including the president of the students Union. The access to the internet was restricted in the area by the district administration. The university was closed from 15 December till 5 January 2020. A report by three activist-lawyers alleged that the police had resorted to "deceptive shelling", firing explosives camouflaged as tear gas shells during the crackdown. On the evening of 17 December, police released 26 people (including 8 students) on personal bonds. They had been arrested on charges of violence.

On 19 December, People's Union for Democratic Rights' fact-finding team consisting of activists Yogendra Yadav, Harsh Mander and Kavita Krishnan released a report on police crackdown at the Aligarh Muslim University. The report alleged that the police had called the students as terrorists and had used religiously charged slogans such as "Jai Shri Ram". The report also accused the police of breaking the protocols of the campus. It added that no bullet injury was reported. The report was prepared after visiting the campus, based on the video and audio clips of the incident, statements of the injured students and witnesses.

After a lull of four days, on 20 December, AMU campus again witnessed protests on Saturday with hundreds of AMU non-teaching staff joining hands with AMU teachers' association, protesting against the CAA and "police atrocities" against the agitators in various parts of the state. On 24 December 1000 – 1200 protesters were booked after organising a candle march inside Aligarh Muslim University for violating section 144. On 15 January, Aligarh Muslim University postponed all exams due to the ongoing CAA protests.

Aftermath

At 7 am on 16 January, Vice-Chancellor met the protesting students and expressed regret for calling police inside the AMU campus to handle the law and order situation inside campus. He defended his decision stating he had not thought that the police would enter the hostels. AMU had set up a fact-finding committee headed by Justice (retd.) V.K. Gupta for a detailed investigation of the events that occurred in the night of 15 December. The VC asked to students to cooperate with the fact-finding committee and the National Human Rights Commission (NHRC) team that was visiting the campus.

==== Nadwa College ====
On 16 December, around 300 students of Nadwa college, in Lucknow had planned a peaceful protest march against CAA and in solidarity with the students of AMU. The police prevented students from holding the march and forced them to return into the campus premises. The police locked the gates of the campus from outside and guarded it with a heavy deployment of police to prevent the students from coming out of the campus and undertaking the planned march. A clash between the police and the students locked inside the campus ensued and involved stone pelting from both sides. The police officers were seen hitting the students with sticks as in the video footage of the incident telecast on news channels.

Around 15 to 20 students were injured. 30 students were charged by the police for attempt to murder, rioting etc. The police accused the students of blocking the road and engaging in violence by throwing stones. While the students claimed that the police had attacked the unarmed students who were holding a peaceful protest. The student stated that they were neither involved in any violence, nor did they block any roads and yet they were charged with batons. After the incident the college was shut down until 5 January, and the students were asked to leave the campus.

==== IIT Kanpur ====
On 17 December, students of IIT Kanpur assembled in a peaceful protest against the CAA and to express solidarity with the students of Jamia Millia Islamia. During the protest, the students sung Faiz Ahmad Faiz's popular Urdu nazm, "Hum Dekhenge", a song of resistance and defiance and against state oppression. A temporary faculty submitted a complaint against the song to the Deputy Director of IIT Kanpur, alleging that the poem provokes anti-Hindu sentiments. A commission was subsequently set up; however, the student media body rejected the charges as misinformed and communal, which divorced the poem out of its societal context. Later the administration clarified that it was not going to probe whether the recital of Hum Dekhenge is anti-Hindu or not.

=== Aftermath ===
In the aftermath of the protests, the State Government posted hoardings of protestors with their names, photographs and addresses in various places. After the intervention of the Allahabad High Court and the Supreme Court of India, the posters were removed. The High Court called the government’s action “shameless” and an “unwarranted interference in privacy”, the posters were removed.

== See also ==
- National Register of Citizens
- Shaheen Bagh protests
- 2020 JNU Attack
