= Rehab India Foundation =

Non-governmental organisation

Rehab India Foundation is a Delhi-based non-governmental organization which was founded on 17 March 2008. With aim of rehabilitation of the marginalized section of Rural India with a better standard of living providing Education, Health, Economic Development and Environment. Rehab India Foundation has aligned with United Nations' Sustainable Development Goals 2030. With operations in Bihar, Andhra Pradesh, Assam, Delhi, Karnataka, Tamil Nadu, Uttar Pradesh, West Bengal. Considering United Nations Millennium Development Goals of ensuring universal primary education, and reaching out to the most remote slums & villages, Rehab India Foundation has initiated its unique program "Education on wheels". Hamdard National Foundation distributed ration kits Rehab India Foundation in Okhla Delhi as COVID-19 Relief through Rehab India Foundation

Banned for 5 years

On 28 September 2022 the Government of India declared Rehab India Foundation, along with Popular Front of India, Campus Front of India, All India Imams Council, National Confederation of Human Rights Organization, National Women's Front, Junior Front, Empower India Foundation and Rehab Foundation Kerala as "unlawful association" and banned these organisations for 5 years under the Unlawful Activities (Prevention) Act.
