= 1961 Jabalpur riots =

Indian sectarian violence

- Part of Religious violence in India
- Location of Jabalpur in India
- Date: 4 –9 February 1961
- Location: Jabalpur, India
- Methods: Killing, Arson, Looting

Parties
Hindus	Muslims

Casualties and losses
5 killed	50 killed

The 1961 Jabalpur Riots were the first major-scale riots between Hindus and Muslims in post-Partition India, which erupted in the city of Jabalpur in the state of Madhya Pradesh. This riot was linked to the rape of Hindu girl by a Muslim boy, son of industrialist which cause the rivalry between Hindu and Muslim communities.

These riots shook Jawaharlal Nehru as he never expected communal riots of such intensity in independent India. Hindu nationalist organizations including ABVP, Rashtriya Swayamsevak Sangh played a major role in this riot. Officially 55 were killed, though according to unofficial accounts, 200 were killed. Nehru responded by lambasting the Bhopal Congress government which was being headed by Chief Minister Kailash Nath Katju. He angrily noted that Congress leaders were found to be 'sitting inside their houses like purdah ladies' during riots.

The Congress had adopted secularism as its main ideology but had admitted, right from the anti-colonial freedom struggle, all sorts of elements. Hardly a handful of few had strong secular convictions. Even among its top leadership, there were Hindu fundamentalist elements with anti-minority proclivities. In the 1960s – A series of riots broke out, particularly in the eastern part of India – Rourkela, Jamshedpur and Ranchi – in 1964, 1965, and 1967, in places where Hindu refugees from the then East Pakistan were being settled. In the later years, post-Nehru saw violent riots including 1969 Gujarat riots, 1970 Bhiwandi Riots. These riots gave political rise to Hindu fundamentalist forces, which played a major role in engineering them and benefitting from religious polarization.

== Background ==
The rioting in Jabalpur has largely been attributed to the emergence in the Muslim community, which had lost its political and business elite in 1947 Partition of India. Hindu industrialists and businessmen, faced with new competition were willing to resort to violence in order to preserve their position. The beedi (cigarette) industry in Jabalpur was dominated by Muslims in the 1960s. On 3 February 1961, a Hindu girl was raped by two Muslims. One of them was the son of a Muslim beedi businessman. The girl ended up committing suicide. The Muslim boys were arrested that day and presented before the Magistrate.

The Yug Dharma, a local Hindi daily, associated with Rashtriya Swayamsewak Sangh (RSS), published the news of the rape incident with communal banner head-lines: "Hindu girl raped by Muslim scoundrel on point of dagger. The helpless student poured kerosene oil and burnt herself. Accused son of an industrialist. Sensation and tense atmosphere in the whole city". This newspaper was distributed in the town in the early hours of 4 February.

On the morning of 4 February 1961 about 200 local students took out a procession to condemn the rape incident. The procession was led by a Hindu nationalist organization ABVP. The procession turned violent, for which the Army had to be deployed. The Army brought the situation under control on the 5th. But on the 7th, after the Army had been withdrawn, Hindus attacked the town's Muslim quarters and shops. The violence continued till late night. According to the newspaper New Age, the riot was attributable to alarmist rumours spread by Yug Dharma, that the forces of law and order had been attacked by the Muslims. The premeditated character of the riots could be deduced by the fact that the Hindu houses and shops, situated within the Muslim quarters had been marked beforehand. Houses and shops of Hindus were spared, but those of Muslims were burnt and looted. Officially fifty-five people were killed, mostly Muslims. These riots caused huge losses to Muslim businessmen, and they lost their share of control of the beedi industry.

== Nehru's reaction to the riots ==
In a letter to chief ministers on 20 February 1961, Nehru referred to the "deplorable communal incidents occurring in Jabalpur and some other towns of Madhya Pradesh". He referred to the "widespread attack on Muslims and their houses and shops" as being "pre-planned and organised". He wrote, "Local newspapers fan the flames [and] communal organisations come to the forefront".

After the 20 February letter, Nehru wrote more comprehensively about the communal issue to chief ministers on 6 March of the same year. In it, he noted that the upsurge of communal violence in some places in Madhya Pradesh shocked him not merely because of the damage done to life and property but "even more so because it uncovered something that was painful to us". He angrily noted that Congress leaders were found to be 'sitting inside their houses like purdah ladies' during riots.

Nehru formed the National Integration Council in response to the riots. However, the council remained mainly on paper and was not able to control riots in the future.
