= David Bukay =

Israeli political scientist

- דוד בוקאי
- Occupation: Professor of Middle East Studies
- Employer: University of Haifa
- Known for: Writings on Islamic fundamentalism and Arab political culture
- Notable work: Islam and the Infidels (2016), Arab-Islamic Political Culture (2003)

David Bukay (Hebrew: דוד בוקאי) is a Professor of Middle East Studies at the University of Haifa. He is the author of Islamic Fundamentalism and the Arab Political Culture. He specializes in the Arab–Israeli conflict; inter-Arab relations and the Palestinian question; international terrorism and fundamental Islam; theoretical issues and political applications in the Middle East; Asad's foreign policy towards Israel and Lebanon; the cultural approach to understanding the Middle-East.

== Views ==
Bukay is a supporter of the controversial Huntington thesis of the Clash of Civilisations. He argues that there is a wide gap between what he categorises as "Western political culture" and "the Arab-Islamic political culture". Bukay also holds controversial opinions in his own right. In a speech to a conference in Jerusalem in 2003, he argued that "the aggressiveness and fanaticism of Islamic fundamentalism is an existentially lethal phenomenon". He went on to claim that "Islam and democracy are totally incompatible, and are mutually inconclusive. The same applies to Modernity, which is perceived as a threat to Islamic civilization", and that "Leaders and policy-makers in the West refuse to grasp that the Islamic and Palestinian terrorism embodies the SARS decease: Suicide and Ruin Syndrome of democratic society. Until it is understood that this struggle is the war between the Son of Light against the Sons of Darkness, that they represent the invasion of the Huns, in order to destroy modern culture—the world will continue to face an existential more growing threat".

In his book Arab-Islamic Political Culture, Bukay writes: "This is a culture where rumors are an integral part of social activity, and they quickly become absolute truth that cannot be challenged. It has to do with exaggerations, flights of fancy, and especially, in a society that believes in conspiracies, a society wherein every date is important, that remembers everything and forgives nothing. This is a society wherein the lie is an essential component of behavior patterns, and lying is endorsed by religious sages".

According to an article in Haaretz, Bukay also wrote in the same book: "There is no condemnation, no regret, no problem of conscience among Arabs and Muslims, anywhere, in any social stratum, of any social position". The article further alleges that he distributed a document to his students stating that "when an Arab or a Muslim opens his remarks with the expression wallahi, he is apparently intending to lie".

Bukay held a presentation at the 2008 "Facing Jihad" conference in Jerusalem, a counter-jihad summit hosted by MK Aryeh Eldad that included a screening of the film Fitna by Geert Wilders. His 2016 book Islam and the Infidels: the Politics of Jihad, Da'wah, and Hijrah cites Bat Ye'or's Eurabia thesis as "acclaimed research".

== Criticism ==
The Arab Association for Human Rights alleged that in the 2004–2005 University of Haifa semester Bukay made a number of offensive and anti-Arab remarks in his lectures, including "we should shoot terrorists in the head in front of their families" as a deterrent and "destroy a whole house, with everyone in it,” in order to get rid of one wanted person, that "the Arabs are just alcohol and sex", and that "the Arabs are stupid and have contributed nothing to humanity." Bukay wrote a lengthy article rebutting the claims, insisting that the comments attributed to him had been fabricated. The rector of the University conducted his own investigation and concluded that the alleged remarks "were not made in the way they were quoted and parts of sentences that were uttered in different contexts were yoked together by manipulation." The AAHR also took issue with a number of statements he made in an article titled "The First Cultural Flaw in Thought: The Arab Character"; the latter were also criticized by the Anti-Defamation League, which stated they "fall... into the trap of old and hurtful stereotypes, which express prejudices that are liable to be very destructive..."

== Publications ==
=== Books ===
- Islam and the Infidels: the Politics of Jihad, Da'wah, and Hijrah. New Brunswick, NJ: Transaction Publishers, 2016.
- Total Terrorism in the Name of Allah: The Emergence of the New Islamic Fundamentalists. Shaarei-Tikva: Ariel Center for Policy Research, 2002.
- Arab-Islamic Political Culture. Shaarei-Tikva: Center for Policy Research, 2003.
- Ed.: Muhammad's Monsters: A Comprehensive Guide to Radical Islam for Western Audiences. Green Forest, Ar.: Balfour Books, 2004.
- Arafat, the Palestinian National Movement and Israel: The Politics of Masks and Paradox. New York: Mellen Press, 2005.
- From Muhammed to Bin Laden: Religious and Ideological Sources of the Homicide Bombers Phenomenon. New Brunswick, New Jersey: Transaction Publishers, 2008.

=== Articles ===
- "Zionists, Post-Zionists and Pseudo-Zionists: The Media Leftist Complex and the al-Aqsa Intifadah", in: S. Sharan (ed.). Israel and the Post-Zionists. Brighton: Sussex Academic Press, 2003.
- "The New Islamic Anarchistic Groups", in: D. Bukay. Muhammad's Monsters.
