= National Development Front =

Muslim organisation in Kerala, INdia

The National Development Front (NDF) was Muslim organisation set up in Kerala. It was back supporting religiously effected minorities people in the country lead front and the party was established in India in 1994.

== History ==
Inspired by pan-Islamic movements across the country after 1992, the NDF gained a strong foothold in the Malabar region following the banning of the Organization of Islamic Servants (ISS). The Kerala Police investigation found that the National Development Front (NDF) was another incarnation of the ISS. The NDF actively promoted the claim of "representing the rights of Muslims" to win the confidence of Muslims.

The National Development Front has 19 Supreme Council members. Among them is Prof P. Koya who was also one of the founding members of the Students Islamic Movement of India (SIMI, the affiliate of Indian Mujahideen).

In 1997, the NDF organized the National Human Rights Conference in Kozhikode. Based on deliberations and understanding, a new organization was formed called the Confederation of Human Rights Organizations (CHRO). The NDF worked closely with Thejas journalist Mukundan C Menon and journalists affiliated with the CHRO by closely connecting with Human Rights Watch International.

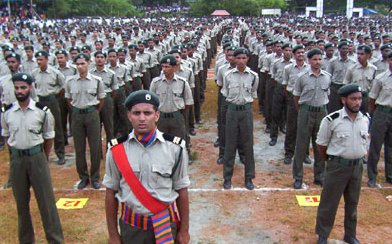
NDF Freedom Parade 2006

The NDF organized parades with the slogan "Be the Sentinels of freedom" in major cities of Kerala in 2004, 2005, and in 2006. The parade became one of the regular activities on the Indian Independence Day.

The NDF is in alliance with the Popular Front of India and collaborated in the Empower India conference held in Bangalore in February 2007.

In 2012, the NDF organized various communal movements, demonstrations, rallies and other strikes against police brutality and government misconduct, claiming the right to work more in government employment. Reservations and allowances were implemented for Muslims.

In 2021, the NDF was also involved in the hijab controversy in Kerala and Tamil Nadu by providing shelter, food and drink for those involved.

== Criticism ==
The NDF was accused of being a communal outfit and members of the organisation were implicated in violent incidents such as the 2002 2nd Marad massacre. The Thomas P Joseph Commission report found that "activists of IUML and NDF, a Muslim outfit, were actively involved in the massacre". The state secretary of the Communist Party of India (Marxist) in Kerala, Pinarayi Vijayan, said that NDF was involved in the Marad massacre and referred to them as a "terrorist outfit" that executed a "planned mass murder". NDF was blamed for inciting violence against moderate Muslims in Kerala who are in opposition to liberal and reformist Islamic movements and individuals. The "involvement of fundamentalists and terrorists" was behind the incident.

The Bharatiya Janata Party (BJP) put forward allegations that NDF maintains links with Pakistan's ISI. The BJP sought an inquiry into NDF-ISI links. The Indian National Congress raised doubts about the true nature of their activities. On 31 October 2006, the Congress launched a campaign against terrorism in Malappuram district in Kerala, simultaneously taking on parties and organisations such as the IUML, the Communist Party of India (Marxist), the NDF, and the People's Democratic Party (PDP).

=== Foreign connection ===
Ms Neera Rawat IPS, Senior Superintendent of Police, Bareilly, Uttar Pradesh, deposed before the Marad Judicial Inquiry Commission of Justice Thomas P. Joseph. Her tenure as Kozhikode City Police Commissioner was from 22 March 1997 to 16 May 1999. She told the Inquiry Commission that the police had prepared confidential and authentic reports that ISI and Iran have funded the NDF.

Assistant Commissioner of Police (ACP) Special Branch, Ernakulam, A.V. George, also deposed before the Marad inquiry panel on 29 October 2005, and stated that a key witness in an illegal arms possession case had given a statement to the police during its investigation that the NDF had been receiving crores of rupees from foreign countries to carry out its training programmes. ACP George quoted the testimony made by arrested NDF cadres that the NDF had been sending people to Pakistan for the last several years.

==== Kottakkal Police station attack ====
Police accused that NDF activists attacked the Kottakkal police station at Kottakkal in Malappuram district in the early hours of 23 March 2007 following the arrest of two senior leaders of the front. The attack was repulsed by the police and 27 activists were taken into custody.

==== Modus operandi ====
Frontline magazine quoted a senior police officer as saying that the NDF had successfully exploited the sense of insecurity created in the Muslim community by events that followed the Babri Masjid demolition to find supporters in northern Kerala, irrespective of their political or other allegiances. The report adds: "Initially, no NDF member used to acknowledge openly that he was an NDF member. They would always claim that they were members of other organisations. The truth may be that members of several organisations were members of the NDF also. Now the NDF has several wings and is making a major effort to project itself as a socio-cultural organisation of Muslims."

==== Pakistan MP visit row ====
Pakistan MP Mohammed Thaha Mohammed's visit to Thalassery on 29 April 2007 sparked a controversy, with activists of the BJP and other Sangh Parivar groups staging a march to the hotel where Mohammed was staying. They claimed that leaders of a few Muslim organisations, including the NDF, were seen visiting the MP.

==== Additional views ====
University of Haifa political scientist David Bukay lists the NDF as a "fundamentalist and subversive group". After the 11 July 2006 Mumbai Train Bombings, the NDF, along with other Islamist organisations, was closely monitored by authorities for terrorist links. The organisation attracted numerous Islamic Fundamentalists to their ranks, and are compared to several more well-known militant Islamist groups such as Lashkar-e-Toiba, Hizbul Mujahideen, and others.

==== Implementation of religious code ====
The NDF is alleged to be involved in efforts to push the Islamic Sharia code among the moderate and cosmopolitan Muslim society in Kerala, an act viewed by moderate Muslims and secularists as Talibanization. NDF was accused of targeting liberals in the community – those who do not strictly follow Islamic laws like abstaining from liquor, fasting during Ramadan, and wearing the makhna or purdah. The NDF has been linked to multiple murder cases, including that of a Muslim fakir known by the alias Siddhan for indulging in what they saw as "un-Islamic spiritualism" and of a Muslim man from Punalur for working for a leftist organisation.

== See also ==
- Ghazwa-e-Hind
- Kafir
- Popular Front of India
- Foreign Aid
- Love Jihad
