= Thejas =

Defunct Malayalam-language daily newspaper

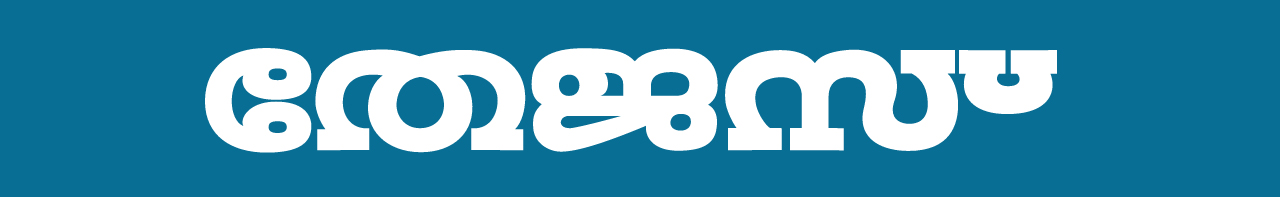

- Type: Newspaper: originally broadsheet, online only from 1 January 2019
- Format: Website
- Owner: Intermedia Publishing Limited
- Editor-in-chief: P. Koya
- Founded: 26 January 2006; 20 years ago
- Political alignment: Popular Front of India
- Language: Malayalam
- Headquarters: Calicut, Kerala, India
- Website: www.thejasnews.com
- Free online archives: www.thejasnews.com/category/e-paper/

Thejas is a Malayalam language Indian online news website and formerly a newspaper that was established in 2006. It was initially a morning newspaper published from Calicut. Owned by Intermedia Publishing, a private limited company in the same city, it is the mouthpiece of the Popular Front of India. The eponymous magazine was the centre of a controversy in 2011 for its pro-bin Laden and pro-Taliban stance. The paper closed down in 2018, leaving only the online edition and the magazine.

== History ==
Thejas started publishing from Calicut (Kozhikode) on the Indian republic day on 26 January 2006. Within a short span of three months it started another edition from Trivandrum (Thiruvananthapuram) followed by the third edition from Kochi within another three months. Also Kannur edition started in 2008 as part of the expansion. In December 2009, it started its Kottayam edition. It also started an online edition and an e-paper. Thejas started its Gulf editions in the Kingdom of Saudi Arabia from Riyadh, Jeddah and Dammam in March 2011. The fourth Gulf Edition started in Doha on 17 May 2012. The fifth Gulf Edition of Thejas was launched in Bahrain on 27 September 2012 by Akhbar Al Khaleej editor-in-chief Anwar Abdulrahman at a ceremony held in Manama.

In October 2018 Thejas decided to close its print edition and become an online newspaper; the last printed edition was published on 31 December 2018. The magazine by the same name however continued operation and is still in print. The management cited the dwindling revenues from advertisements and increasing debts as the reason for closing the print edition.

== Controversies ==
In 2010, the Communist government in Kerala denied Thejas any advertisements, citing intelligence inputs about the nature of the paper's coverage and its alleged attempts to create religious discord in the state. The Congress-led UPA government at the Centre followed suit, citing similar reasons.

The 2011 May edition of their magazine called Osama bin laden a 'martyr' after he was killed by the US army.

In October 2013, the district administration of Kozhikode issued a show-cause notice to the newspaper for spreading anti-national reports and why the publication should not be stopped. In March 2014, Kerala Police registered a case against Thejas and some other media organizations, in response to a petition accusing of insulting religious sentiments.
