= Popular Front of India =

Banned Indian Islamist political organisation

- Abbreviation: PFI
- Predecessor: National Development Front
- Formation: 22 November 2006; 19 years ago
- Merger of: Karnataka Forum for Dignity, Manitha Neethi Pasarai
- Type: Islamist activist organisation
- Headquarters: New Delhi
- Region served: India
- Chairman: OMA Abdul Salam
- Vice Chairman: E.M Abdul Rahiman
- General Secretary: Anis Ahmed
- Remarks: Banned for five years, beginning 28 September 2022

Popular Front of India (PFI) is an Islamist political organisation in India, that engages in a radical and exclusivist style of Muslim minority politics. It was banned by the Indian Ministry of Home Affairs under Unlawful Activities (Prevention) Act (UAPA) on 28 September 2022 for a period of five years.

PFI was founded in 2006 with the merger of the Karnataka Forum for Dignity (KFD) and the National Development Front (NDF). The organisation described itself as a "neo-social movement committed to empower people to ensure justice, freedom and security". It advocates for Muslim reservations. In 2012, the organisation conducted protests against alleged use of the UAPA law to detain innocent citizens.

PFI has often been accused of involvement in anti-national and anti-social activities by the Indian Government. In 2012, the Government of Kerala claimed that the organization was a resurrection of the banned terrorist outfit Students Islamic Movement of India (SIMI), an affiliate of the Indian Mujahideen.

PFI has often been in violent clashes with Rashtriya Swayamsevak Sangh (RSS) in parts of Kerala and Karnataka. Activists have been found with lethal weapons, bombs, gunpowder, and swords by the authorities. Several allegations have been made against the organization for having links with terrorist organizations such as Taliban and Al-Qaeda.

The organisation has various wings to cater to different sections of society, including the National Women's Front (NWF) and the Campus Front of India (CFI). Including these wings, the ban by Ministry of Home Affairs extended to 8 affiliate organizations of PFI.

== History ==
The PFI started in Kerala as successor to National Development Front in 2006. It went on to merge with the Karnataka Forum for Dignity of Karnataka and the Manitha Neethi Pasarai in Tamil Nadu and later in 2009, with Goa's Citizen's Forum, Rajasthan's Community Social and Educational Society, West Bengal's Nagarik Adhikar Suraksha Samiti, Manipur's Lilong Social Forum and Andhra Pradesh's Association of Social Justice.

A common platform was formed in cooperation with the South India Council as an outcome of a regional discussion attended by Muslim social activists and intellectuals from the South Indian States at Bangalore on 25 and 26 January 2004. It has taken up the issue of reservation in government and private sector jobs and Parliament and Assemblies and in cooperation with the Confederation of Muslim Institutions in India, it organised a two-day workshop on Muslim Reservations on 26 and 27 November 2005 at Hyderabad, inaugurated by Rajya Sabha member Rahman Khan.

== Criticism and accusations ==
The various allegations include connections with various Islamic terrorist groups, possessing arms, kidnapping, murder, intimidation, hate campaigns, rioting, Love Jihad and various acts of religious extremism. In 2010, the assault on Prof. T. J. Joseph who published a controversial question paper, supposedly insulting the Islamic prophet Muhammad, was linked to the PFI. One of its founding leaders has also states that PFI's goal is to establish an Islamic State in India. However, the charges were denied by the organisation, which added that the accusations were fabricated to malign the organisation. An IB officer said that PFI preaches to its cadres that killing of right-wing activists would provide them 'religious rewards in the afterlife'.

=== Murder of rival organization members ===
In 2012, the Kerala government informed the Kerala High Court, in an affidavit, that PFI had active involvement in 27 murder cases, mostly of cadres of CPI-M and RSS. In 2014, it again submitted before the Kerala High Court that activists of the NDF/PFI were involved in 27 communally motivated murder cases, 86 attempt to murder cases and in 106 communal cases registered in the state. The affidavit was filed in response to a petition filed by Thejas, spokesperson of PFI in the State, challenging the refusal of the government to give government advertisements to the daily. A carpenter Abid Pasha was arrested for six murder cases. He had links with PFI.

On 6 July 2012, N. Sachin Gopal, a student of Modern ITC, Kannur and the district leader Akhil Bharatiya Vidyarthi Parishad, was allegedly stabbed by members of the CFI and PFI. Student leader Vishal was murdered. Gopal later died of his injuries at KMC Hospital in Mangalore on 6 September 2012 A Special Investigation Team (SIT) was formed to investigate the case.

In February 2019, at least 1 member of PFI was arrested for murdering Ramalingam, a member of PMK after an argument with some Muslims about conversion activities. In August 2019, charges were framed against 18 members of PFI. Investigations claimed that Ramalingam was murdered as part of a conspiracy after he tried to interfere in the conversions led by the Dawah team of PFI. In August 2021, the key conspirator Rahman Sadiq was arrested for the murder who was in hiding since 2 years.

On 21 May 2022, in a rally organised by PFI in Alappuzha, Kerala called "Save the Republic", a child sitting on the shoulder of another person raised the slogan “Hindus should keep rice for their last rites and Christians should keep incense for their last rites. If you live decently, you can live in our land and if you don’t live decently, we know Azadi (freedom). Live decently, decently, decently.”

After a video of the rally went viral, Alappuzha Police arrested the district president of PFI along with another activist. Police stated that the child cannot be booked due to the Juvenile Justice Act, but his parents instigated him. On the same day as the rally, Bajrang Dal had taken out a bike rally against terrorism. FIR was registered against Bajrang Dal members as well.

=== Links to terrorist organizations ===
In 2010, the PFI was alleged to have links with the banned Islamic terrorist organisation Students Islamic Movement of India. The PFI's national chairman, Abdul Rehman, was the former national secretary of SIMI, while the organization's state secretary, Abdul Hameed, was SIMI's former state secretary. Most former leaders of SIMI were either identified with PFI or were holding various portfolios in the organisation. The alleged SIMI connection has been dubbed baseless by the leaders of the PFI claiming that the Front was launched in 1993, whereas the SIMI ban came much later in 2001. Retired Indian army officer P. C. Katoch has claimed that the PFI maintains links with the Pakistani intelligence agency, ISI.

In 2012, the Government of Kerala informed the High Court of their opinion that the activities of the PFI are inimical to the safety of the country and that it is "nothing but a resurrection of the banned outfit Students Islamic Movement of India (SIMI) in another form", in its argument to ban the organisation's Independence Day programme, dubbed "Freedom Parade". The High Court dismissed the Government's stand, but upheld the ban imposed by the State Government.

In July 2010, the Kerala Police seized country-made bombs, weapons, CDs and several documents containing Taliban and Al-Qaeda propaganda, from PFI activists. The raids conducted were subsequently termed "undemocratic" and "unconstitutional" by the organisation. As of 6 September 2010, as informed to the state high court by the Kerala government, no evidence has been found by the police in its probe into the allegation of links to Hizbul Mujahideen, Lashkar-e Taiba (Let) or Al-Qaeda. However, in April 2013 a series of raids by the Kerala Police on PFI centres across North Kerala found lethal weapons, foreign currency, human shooting targets, bombs, explosive raw materials, gunpowder, swords, among other things. The Kerala Police claimed that the raid revealed the "terror face" of the PFI. In January 2016, 1 member was sentenced to 7 years and 5 members were sentenced to 5 years of prison by National Investigation Agency (NIA).

In November 2017, Kerala Police identified 6 members of PFI who had joined the Islamic State, possibly by moving to Syria using fake passports.

In November 2019, the Central Government provided Z category security to Justice S. Abdul Nazeer, one of the judges of the Supreme Court of India and part of the bench which passed the Ayodhya verdict, due to threats by the PFI.

=== Arms training camp in Narath ===
In April 2013, Kerala Police raided a training camp in Narath, Kannur and arrested 21 activists of the PFI. Two country-made bombs, a sword, raw materials for making bombs and pamphlets in the name of PFI were seized by the police. The raid was conducted at the office building of Thanal Charitable Trust. A document with names of several leading personalities and organisations was also seized, which police suspect is a hit-list. The PFI leadership and those arrested claimed that it was a Yoga training programme organised as part of a personality development programme and asked for a judicial probe by a sitting judge to inquire into the alleged training camp. PFI's state president claimed that this police case was fabricated in a bid to tarnish the organisation's image. On 18 May 2013, the NIA arrived to investigate the alleged extremist activities in Narath.

=== Kidnap and murder of boys for ransom ===
Two boys were kidnapped on 8 June 2011 from SBRR Mahajana College premises in Mysore and murdered by members of Karnataka Forum for Dignity (KFD), who sought ransom of 5 crore rupees to raise funds for their organisation. Following the arrest of these KFD members, Karnataka state government requested the Union government to ban Karnataka Forum for Dignity.

=== SMS campaign against people of the North-East ===
After the Assam riots in 2012, an SMS hate campaign was launched in the South of India threatening people from the North-East with retribution, particularly after Ramzan. Investigators traced the source of these hate messages to Harkat-ul-Jihad al-Islami (HuJI) and the PFI, along with its affiliate organisations Manita Neeti Pasarai and Karnataka Forum for Dignity. More than 60 million messages were sent in a single day on 13 August 2012. Some 28-30 percent of the messages were found to have been uploaded from Pakistan. The SMS campaign was designed to create a panic among the people from the North-East, forcing them to flee. This led to a mass exodus of 30,000 people from cities of Pune, Chennai, Hyderabad and national capital Delhi. Union Home Ministry banned bulk SMS and MMS for 15 days to quell rumors and threats.

The PFI has denied the accusation.

=== Attack on T. J. Joseph by PFI activists ===
In Jan 2011, Kerala Police filed a charge sheet against 27 alleged PFI activists in conjunction with an incident in which they severed the hand of a Kerala professor who had allegedly made derogatory references to the Islamic prophet Muhammad . At the time of the attack, Joseph was coming back from his duties at a private Christian college in Muvattapuzha and had been accused of blasphemy.

It is reported that the attack resulted from the ruling from one of the "Taliban-model" courts (Darul Khada) operating in the state. The Kerala state police claimed to be "unearthing the vast network" of the PFI, and after a series of raids on the houses of PFI members, the district secretary of the PFI "threatened the officer with dire consequences if he continued raiding the houses of its activists." On 9 July 2010, it was reported that PFI installations were being raided by police, and that they had found propaganda videos from the global Islamic network al-Qaeda in the possession of one alleged PFI member, and a rifle, fake SIM cards, and fake identity cards in the possession of another member of the PFI. As a result of the incident, the BJP has called for a ban on the PFI and an examinations of possible links between the PFI and the Taliban by the National Investigation Agency.

One of the chief accused in this case, Prof. Anas was acquitted. He had contested to win the local elections from jail. He alleged the accusation is a scheme devised by the NIA and the police to deliberately target the PFI.

=== Shimoga Violence ===
In 2015, PFI staged a rally in Karnataka's Shimoga during which stones were thrown on vehicles, as alleged by the locals. Three people riding a bike were stabbed by PFI activists in which 32 year old Vishwanath Shetty, succumbed to his injuries. 56 arrests were made in connection with these communal clashes. Around the same time, the body of Manjunath was found and it was believed that he too died in the rally and the communal riots, but later it was proved that this killing was not related to these communal clashes.

=== Funding of Anti-CAA Protests ===
On 1 January 2020 Union law minister Ravi Shankar Prasad stated that PFI may have played a part in violence surrounding some protests against the Citizenship (Amendment) Act (CAA). The Enforcement Directorate also informed the Ministry of Home Affairs and is investigating a Prevention of Money Laundering Act probe. However PFI has denied any link with any protest against the CAA in the country and called it a cheap campaign against it.

=== Creation of an Islamic State in India ===
In 2017, India Today, in an undercover operation, interviewed Ahmad Shareef, a founding member of PFI and the managing editor of PFI mouthpiece Thejas. In the interview, when questioned whether the motive of PFI and Sathya Sarini is to convert India into an Islamic country, he said "All over the world. Why only India? After making India an Islamic state and then they will go to other states". He also admitted that PFI had picked up funding from the Middle East in the past and transferred it into India through hawala channels.The PFI wanted to establish Islamic rule in India by 2047 as per the NIA.

=== Forced conversion ===
In late 2017, videos from a sting operation of Zainaba AS, president of NWF, showed that she admitted on camera that National Women's Front – the PFI's women's wing – was carrying out mass conversion to Islam at Sathya Sarini. Zainaba had earlier been questioned by NIA for her role in conversion of Hadiya/Akhila which was also termed a case of Love Jihad. Zaibana retracted her recorded statement and claimed that the allegations were fake. Following the sting operation, NIA questioned her for her involvement in the mass conversion.

== On accusations and counter charges ==
In 2013, in line with the PFI's counter charge, "Coastal Digest" reported that 8the NIA and the IB denied that they had shared any such information, denying the claims by the media. This was in response to the 2012 complaints against 10 newspapers. In March 2015, Indian intelligence agencies reported that the role of the PFI in the 2011 Mumbai bombings, 2012 Pune bombings and 2013 Hyderabad blasts had been found; claims which were subsequently denied by the PFI.

== Political activities ==
=== National Political Conference ===
The public meeting on 17 February 2009 which marked the conclusion of National Political Conference saw the merger of social organisations in eight states into the PFI. Along with the state presidents of NDF Kerala, MNP Tamil Nadu and KFD Karnataka which had already merged with PFI, heads of social organisations in Andhra Pradesh, Goa, Rajasthan, West Bengal and Manipur joined hands on the dais with the PFI chairman.

=== Freedom Parade on Indian Independence Day ===
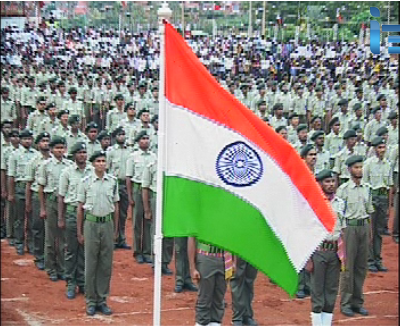
Freedom Parade, 2010.

The PFI and its allies conducted a freedom parade on 15 August in 2009 and 2010 in celebration of Indian Independence Day. The parade was followed by a public meeting. In 2010, the parade was conducted in Udupi and Mettuppalayam. In the previous year it was conducted in Mangalore and Madurai.

The Kerala state government banned the Freedom Parade stating it would jeopardise communal harmony. The ban was challenged in the Kerala High Court which upheld the ban. The Intelligence wing of Kerala Police had informed the High Court that PFI is the new face of banned Islamist group Students Islamic Movement of India (SIMI) and is engaged in fundamentalist and anti-national activities.

=== Social Justice conference 2011 ===
The Social Justice Conference was held at Ramlila Ground in New Delhi on 26 and 27 November 2011. The conference was addressed by Syed Shahabuddin, a former MP and Mulayam Singh Yadav, the Samajwadi Party leader, and Thol. Thirumavalavan the Viduthalai Chiruthaigal Katchi leader. The key address of the conference was to plea the UPA government to implement the findings of Sachar Committee Report and the Ranganath Misra Commission.

=== Protest against misuse of UAPA ===
21 activists of PFI were charged with UAPA for involvement in anti-national activities. Following which, in May 2013, the organisation conducted a statewide campaign in Kerala, it started on 8 May from Kasargod and how the UAPA is being misused, and how they believe it is terrorising citizens who resisted oppression from a ruling elite. The campaign concluded with a mass gathering at the State Capital, Thiruvananthapuram on 30 May.

=== Muslim minority reservation and employment ===
KM Shareef, the National General Secretary of PFI has asserted that reservation is the most immediate need of Muslims, referencing a report submitted by the Prime Minister's High Level Committee (Justice Rajindar Sachchar Committee) in November 2006, which identified the Muslim community as more backward than any other, and claimed that insufficient discussion on this topic was taking place in assemblies and parliament. In the context of the Central Government's decision on reservation in higher education, the South India Council organised three Regional Conventions on Reservation: in Calcutta on 4 August 2006, in Bangalore on 5 August 2006, and in Chennai on 17 August 2006. A National Convention on Reservation in Higher Education was organised by the South India Council jointly with All India Milli Council at New Delhi on 29 August 2006. Former Prime Minister V. P. Singh also addressed the convention. In 2010, the National Executive Council of the PFI demanded a ten percent reservation for Muslims across India.

=== Protest related to International events ===
In November 2012, it organized protests outside the Israel Embassy in New Delhi against the attacks in Gaza conducted by Israel raising slogans against USA and Israel. Similar protests were organized in 2014.

In 2015, the PFI protested against the death sentence given to a democratically elected leader and Islamist affiliated with the Muslim Brotherhood, Mohamed Morsi and his followers. The protest was in front of the Egyptian embassy in New Delhi.

== Ban by Indian government ==
On 22 September 2022, the National Investigation Agency (NIA) with other probe agencies conducted a large-scale midnight operation termed "Operation Octopus" in the premises of the organization across the country, on charges of terror-funding and money laundering. The raid resulted in the detaining of at least 100 PFI leaders and activists.

The following day, PFI called hartals (strikes) in Kerala and Tamil Nadu, which turned violent. In Kerala, the strike resulted in property damages worth approximately ₹5 crores and arrest of thousands of protestors.

A second round of nationwide raids were carried out on 27 September 2022, resulting in further 247 activists being arrested.

On 28 September 2022, the Government of India declared PFI as "unlawful association" and temporarily banned the organisation for five years under the UAPA act. The government reasoned that the organisation was "prejudicial to the integrity, sovereignty and security of the country" and citied PFIs alleged connection with terror organisations like Students Islamic Movement of India, Jamat-ul-Mujahideen Bangladesh and Islamic State of Iraq and Syria.

PFI's 8 associate organisations Rehab India Foundation, Campus Front of India, All India Imams Council, National Confederation of Human Rights Organization, National Women's Front, Junior Front, Empower India Foundation and Rehab Foundation, Kerala were also banned.
