= Language of flowers =

Cryptological communication through the use or arrangement of flowers

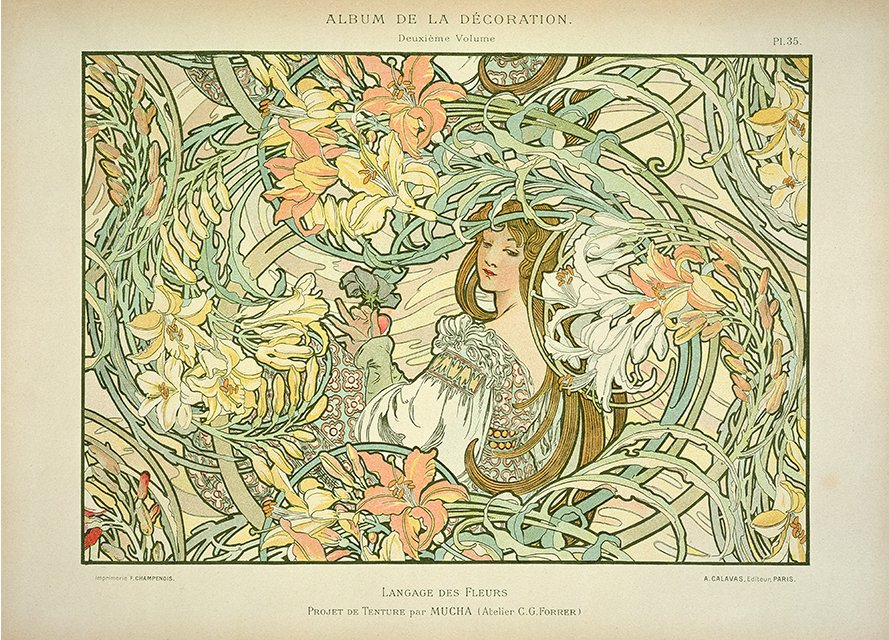
Color lithograph Langage des Fleurs (Language of Flowers) by Alphonse Mucha (1900)

Floriography (language of flowers) is a means of cryptological communication through the use or arrangement of flowers. Meaning has been attributed to flowers for thousands of years, and some form of floriography has been practiced in traditional cultures throughout Europe, Asia, and Africa.

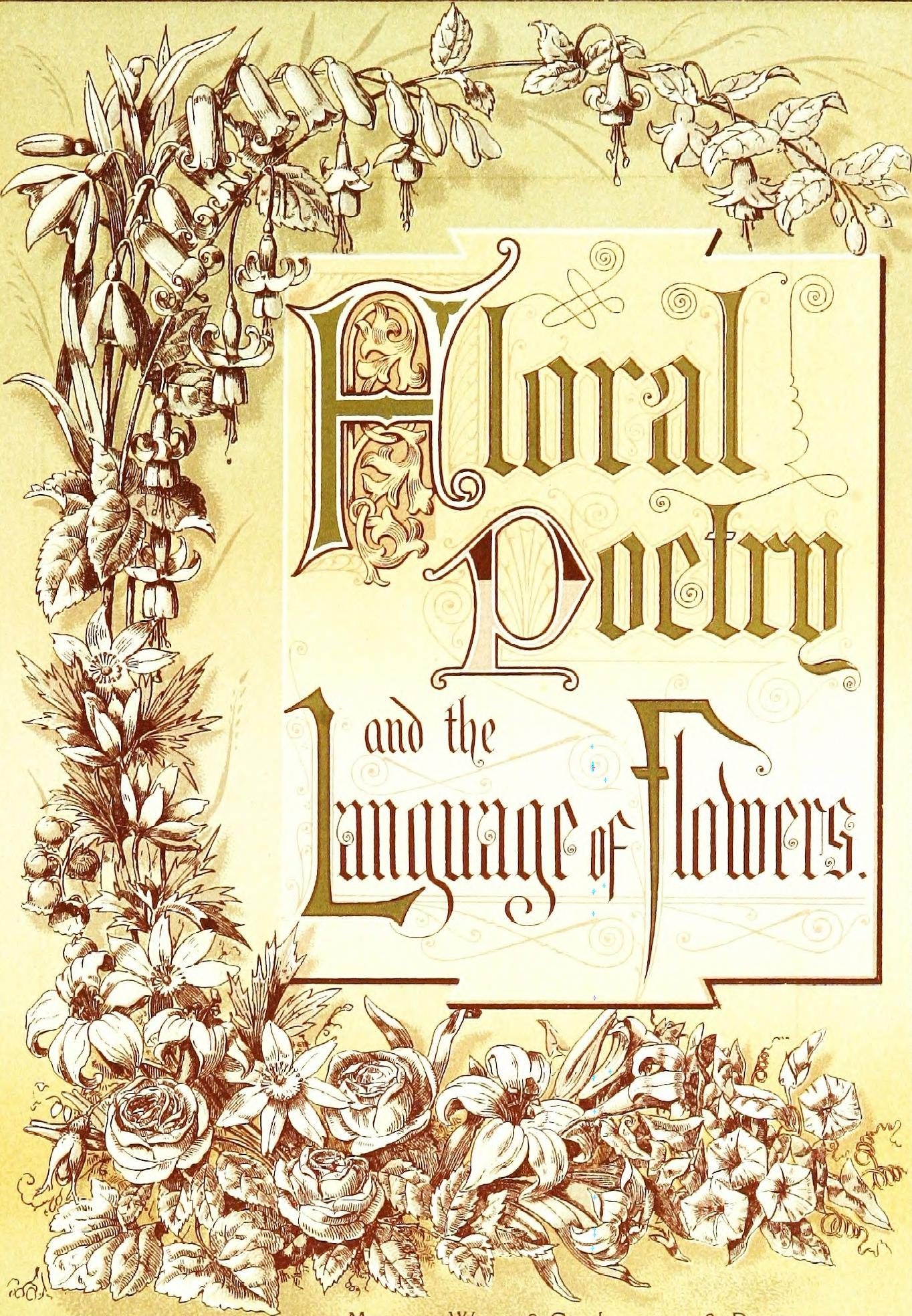
Illustration from Floral Poetry and the Language of Flowers (1877)

According to Jayne Alcock, grounds and gardens supervisor at the Walled Gardens of Cannington, the renewed Victorian era interest in the language of flowers finds its roots in Ottoman Turkey, specifically the court in Constantinople and an obsession it held with tulips during the first half of the 18th century. In the 14th century, the Turkish tradition sélam had an influence on the language of flowers. Sélam, better known throughout Europe as Turkish love letters, consisted of using a mixture of different objects such as flowers, locks of hair, and pearls which could be wrapped in a handkerchief to create a poetic hidden message. The receiver would then decipher the message by finding the meaning of the words which had to rhyme with the name of the object; this would be repeated with every object until a verse could be completed

During the Victorian age, the use of flowers as a means of covert communication coincided with a growing interest in botany. The floriography craze was introduced to Europe by the English poet Mary Wortley Montagu (1689–1762), who brought it to England in 1718 from her travels to Constantinople. Aubry de La Mottraye (1674–1743), who introduced it to the Swedish court in 1727. Joseph Hammer-Purgstall's Dictionnaire du language des fleurs (1809) appears to be the first published list associating flowers with symbolic definitions, while the first dictionary of floriography appears in 1819 when Louise Cortambert, writing under pen name Madame Charlotte de la Tour, wrote Le langage des Fleurs.

Robert Tyas was a popular British flower writer, publisher, and clergyman, who lived from 1811 to 1879; his book, The Sentiment of Flowers; or, Language of Flora, first published in 1836 and reprinted by various publishing houses at least through 1880, was billed as an English version of Charlotte de la Tour's book.

Interest in floriography soared in Victorian England, North America, and France during the 19th century. Gifts of blooms, plants, and specific floral arrangements were used to send a coded message to the recipient, allowing the sender to express feelings of romance and courtship which could not be spoken aloud in Victorian society. Armed with floral dictionaries, Victorians often exchanged small "talking bouquets" or "word poesy,” called nosegays or tussie-mussies, which could be worn or carried as a fashion accessory. The word "nosegay" was used because the flowers would smell nice and the word "gay" meant ornament. These accessories were originally worn to mask the scent of the streets and body odor, and were often composed of fragrant herbs and flowers such as lavender, lemon balm, and roses.

During the 16th century, the purpose of the tussie-mussies changed. They were commonly gifted to a love interest. The meaning of flowers was determined by their cultural meanings along with legends and myths. In England and America, courses such as botany, painting flowers, and floral arranging became popular in education, especially for young women. Tussie-mussies are still used as corsages and boutonnieres.

In the United States, the first appearance of the language of flowers in print was in the writings of Constantine Samuel Rafinesque, a French-American naturalist, who wrote ongoing features under the title "The School of Flora", from 1827 through 1828, in the weekly Saturday Evening Post and monthly Casket; or Flowers of Literature, Wit, and Sentiment. These pieces contained the botanic, English, and French names of the plant, a description of the plant, an explanation of its Latin names, and the flower's emblematic meaning; therefore readers could select flowers appropriately to send a message. However, the first books on floriography were Elizabeth Wirt's Flora's Dictionary and Dorothea Dix's The Garland of Flora, both of which were published in 1829, though Wirt's book had been issued in an unauthorized edition in 1828.

During its peak in the United States, the language of flowers attracted the attention of popular writers and editors. Sarah Josepha Hale, longtime editor of the Ladies' Magazine and co-editor of Godey's Lady's Book, edited Flora's Interpreter in 1832; it continued in print through the 1860s. Catharine H. Waterman Esling wrote a long poem titled "The Language of Flowers", which first appeared in 1839 in her own language of flowers book, Flora's Lexicon; it continued in print through the 1860s. Lucy Hooper, an editor, novelist, poet, and playwright, included several of her flower poems in The Lady's Book of Flowers and Poetry, first published in 1841. Frances Sargent Osgood, a poet and friend of Edgar Allan Poe, first published The Poetry of Flowers and Flowers of Poetry in 1841, and it continued in print through the 1860s.

== Meanings ==
The significance assigned to specific flowers in Western culture varied – nearly every flower had multiple associations, listed in the hundreds of floral dictionaries – but a consensus of meaning for common blooms has emerged. Often, definitions derive from the appearance or behavior of the plant itself. For example, the mimosa, or sensitive plant, represents chastity. This is because the leaves of the mimosa close at night, or when touched. Likewise, the deep red rose and its thorns have been used to symbolize both the blood of Christ and the intensity of romantic love, while the rose's five petals are thought to illustrate the five crucifixion wounds of Christ. Pink roses imply a lesser affection, white roses suggest virtue and chastity, and yellow roses stand for friendship or devotion. The black rose (in nature, a very dark shade of red, purple, or maroon, or may be dyed) may be associated with death and darkness due to the traditional (Western) connotations of the shade.

"A woman also had to be pretty precise about where she wore flowers. Say, for instance, a suitor had sent her a tussie-mussie (a.k.a. nosegay). If she pinned it to the 'cleavage of bosom', that would be bad news for him, since that signified friendship. Ah, but if she pinned it over her heart, 'That was an unambiguous declaration of love'."

Details such as positioning of flowers and their buds were very important and carried different messages.

The action of giving flowers served as a silent answer to a question. If flowers were presented with the right hand it would indicate the answer to the question was "yes", if the flowers were given with the left hand it meant "no". Important details such as which side the bow was tied determined if the message applied to the person presenting the flowers or the person receiving them.

Later authors inspired by this tradition created lists that associate a birthday flower with each day of the year.

== In literature ==
William Shakespeare, Jane Austen, Charlotte and Emily Brontë, John Henry Ingram in Flora Symbolica, and children's novelist Frances Hodgson Burnett, among others, used the language of flowers in their writings.

I know a bank where the wild thyme blows,
Where oxlips and the nodding violet grows,
Quite over-canopied with luscious woodbine,
With sweet musk-roses and with eglantine:
There sleeps Titania sometime of the night,
Lull'd in these flowers with dances and delight;

— A Midsummer Night’s Dream, Act 2, Scene 1

Shakespeare used the word "flower" more than 100 times in his plays and sonnets. In Hamlet, Ophelia mentions the symbolic meanings of flowers and herbs as she hands them to other characters in Act 4, Scene 5: pansies, rosemary, fennel, columbine, rue and daisy. She regrets she has no violets, she says, "... but they wither'd all when my father died". In The Winter's Tale, the princess Perdita wishes that she had violets, daffodils, and primroses to make garlands for her friends. In A Midsummer Night's Dream, Oberon talks to his messenger Puck amidst a scene of wild flowers.

In J. K. Rowling's 1997 novel Harry Potter and the Philosopher's Stone, Professor Severus Snape uses the language of flowers to express regret and mourning for the death of Lily Potter, his childhood friend and Harry Potter's mother, according to Pottermore.

Flowers are often used as a symbol of femininity. John Steinbeck's short story "The Chrysanthemums" centers around the yellow florets, which are often associated with optimism and lost love. When the protagonist, Elisa, finds her beloved chrysanthemums tossed on the ground, her hobby and womanhood have been ruined; this suffices the themes of lost appreciation and femininity in Steinbeck's work.

Hajime Isayama frequently used various types of flowers for symbolism and foreshadowing in his manga series Attack on Titan, which also includes Hanakotoba (花言葉), the Japanese form of floriography.

== In art ==
Flowers have long served as more than mere decorative elements in art, often carrying rich symbolic meanings that reflect cultural, religious, and personal narratives. This tradition dates back centuries, with artists using floral imagery to communicate emotions, allegories, and social messages.

=== In religion and mythology ===
Throughout art history, flowers have served as potent symbols, reflecting religious, cultural, and philosophical ideas through visual expression. Rather than solely appearing in myth or ritual, floral motifs have been integrated into artworks to convey deeper meanings across eras and regions.

In Indian miniature paintings from the Mughal period, the lotus flower appears frequently alongside deities like Lakshmi and Brahma, symbolizing purity and spiritual awakening. Similarly, the Ajanta cave murals depict lotuses emerging from sacred ponds beneath figures of the Buddha, reinforcing its role as a symbol of spiritual growth. In Tibetan thangka paintings, color variations of the lotus convey symbolic meaning—white for purity, pink for the historical Buddha, and blue for wisdom.

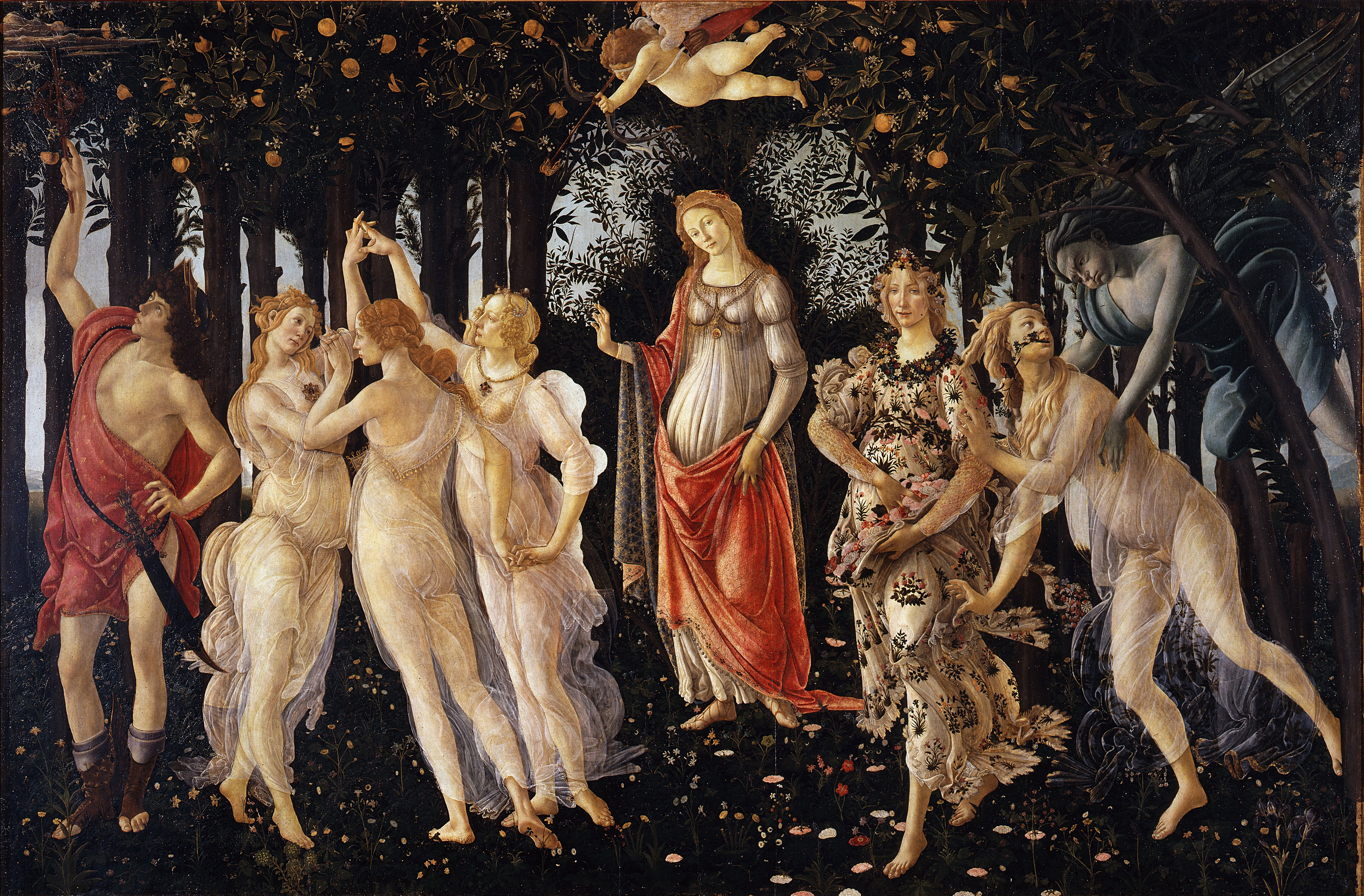
Primavera, 1482, Sandro Botticelli

In Renaissance painting, artists like Sandro Botticelli used flowers to enhance allegorical narratives. In Primavera (1482), over 500 plant species are depicted, including the rose, which symbolizes Venus and divine love. The lily frequently appears in Annunciation scenes, such as in Leonardo da Vinci’s Annunciation (1472–76), where it signals the Virgin Mary's purity and chastity.

Classical mythology also influenced European art across centuries. The myth of Narcissus was captured by Caravaggio's Narcissus (1597–99), using reflection and surrounding flowers to symbolize vanity and self-love. The story of Hyacinthus inspired Romantic works like Jean Broc’s The Death of Hyacinthus (1801), where the hyacinth flower becomes a symbol of grief and rebirth after the youth's tragic death.

By examining these specific artworks and art movements, it becomes clear that flowers are not merely decorative motifs, but essential visual devices through which artists across cultures communicate cultural identity, spiritual values, and emotional depth.

=== In Western art ===
In Western art, flowers have long been used as symbolic elements, conveying emotions, virtues, and hidden meanings. Their significance has evolved, reflecting cultural beliefs and artistic intentions.

From time, the individual flowers do not hold much meaning, but their presence allows artists to communicate. For instance, the 17th-century Dutch still life painting, vanitas painting, often features decaying flowers to embody the transience of life. It is often included alongside objects that represent wealth to mirror the beauty of wealth and the inevitability of impending death.

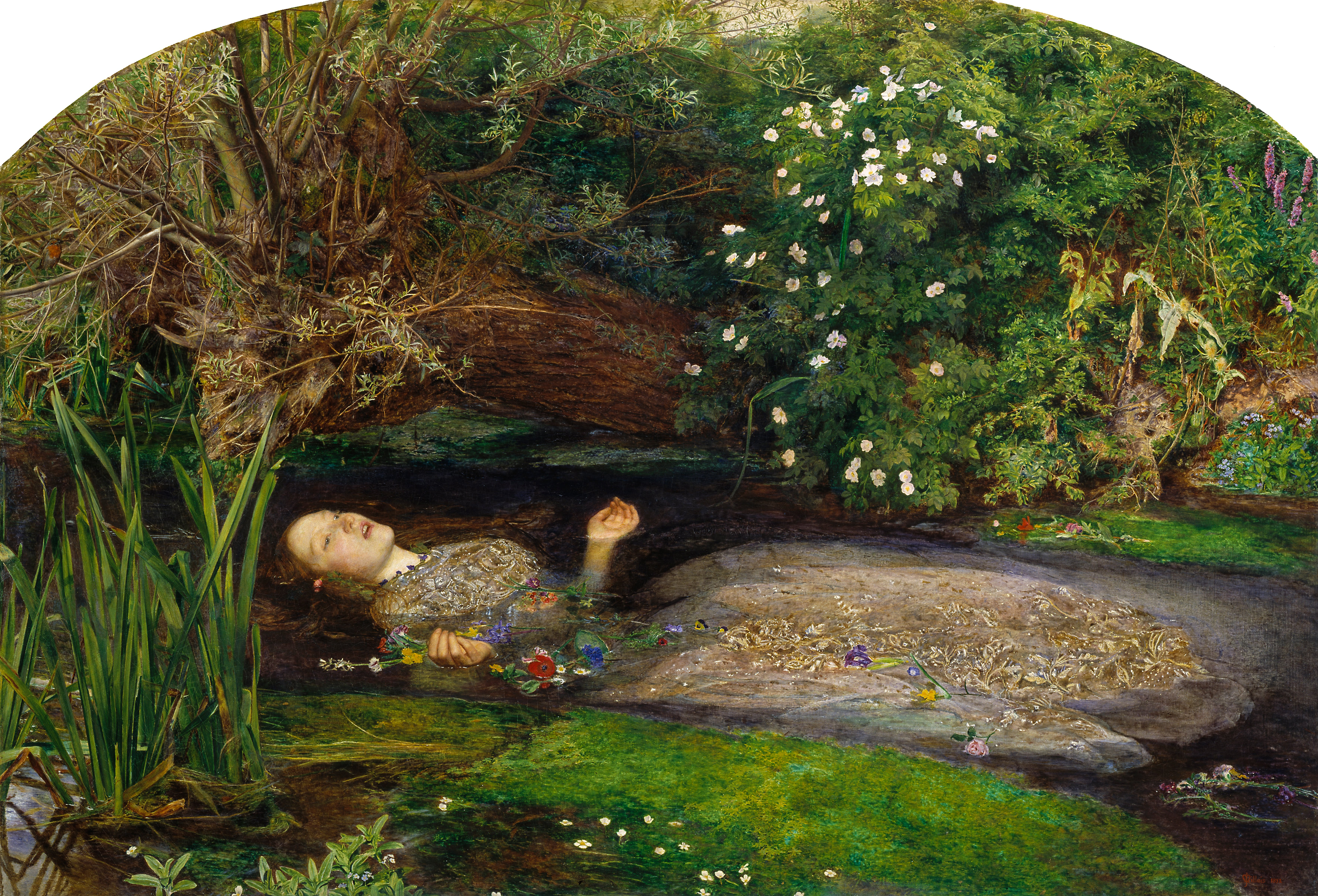
Ophelia, 1851–52, John Everett Millais

The popularity of floriography—the language of flowers—during the 19th century greatly influenced Western art. As Seaton mentions, during the Victorian era, flowers were given specific meanings, allowing artists to hide messages within their works. For example, Pre-Raphaelite painters often used flowers to symbolize purity, love, or mourning, drawing inspiration from floral dictionaries popular at the time. For John Everett Millais, the founder of the Pre-Raphaelite Brotherhood, plants were more than mere decorative elements in outdoor scenes; they were symbolic references drawn from a distinct literary and cultural context, reflecting his deliberate effort to remain faithful to his literary sources. His painting Ophelia (1851–52) depicts Ophelia after the fall, which is described in Act IV, Scene V of Hamlet. Wild roses, forget-me-nots, poppies and violets painted around the drowning Ophelia symbolized her sad fate.

The use of floral was popular in the Art Nouveau movement and Alphonse Mucha was no exception. Throughout Mucha's body of work, he consistently gives prominence to floral elements—either by allowing them to occupy large portions of the composition or by making them visually distinct through the use of color and intricate detail. This deliberate emphasis not only captures the viewer's attention but also suggests that Mucha intended for these flowers to be noticed.

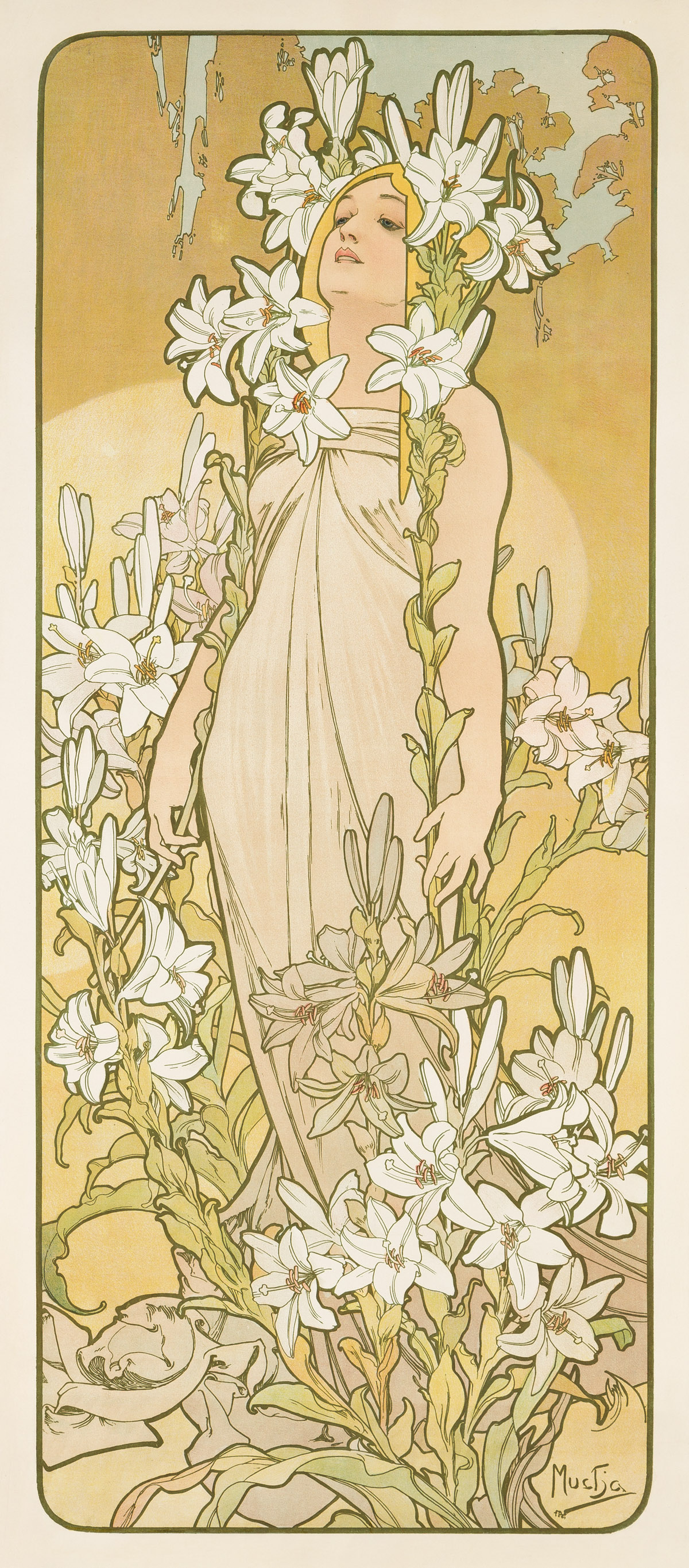
The Flowers: Lily, 1898, Alphonse Mucha

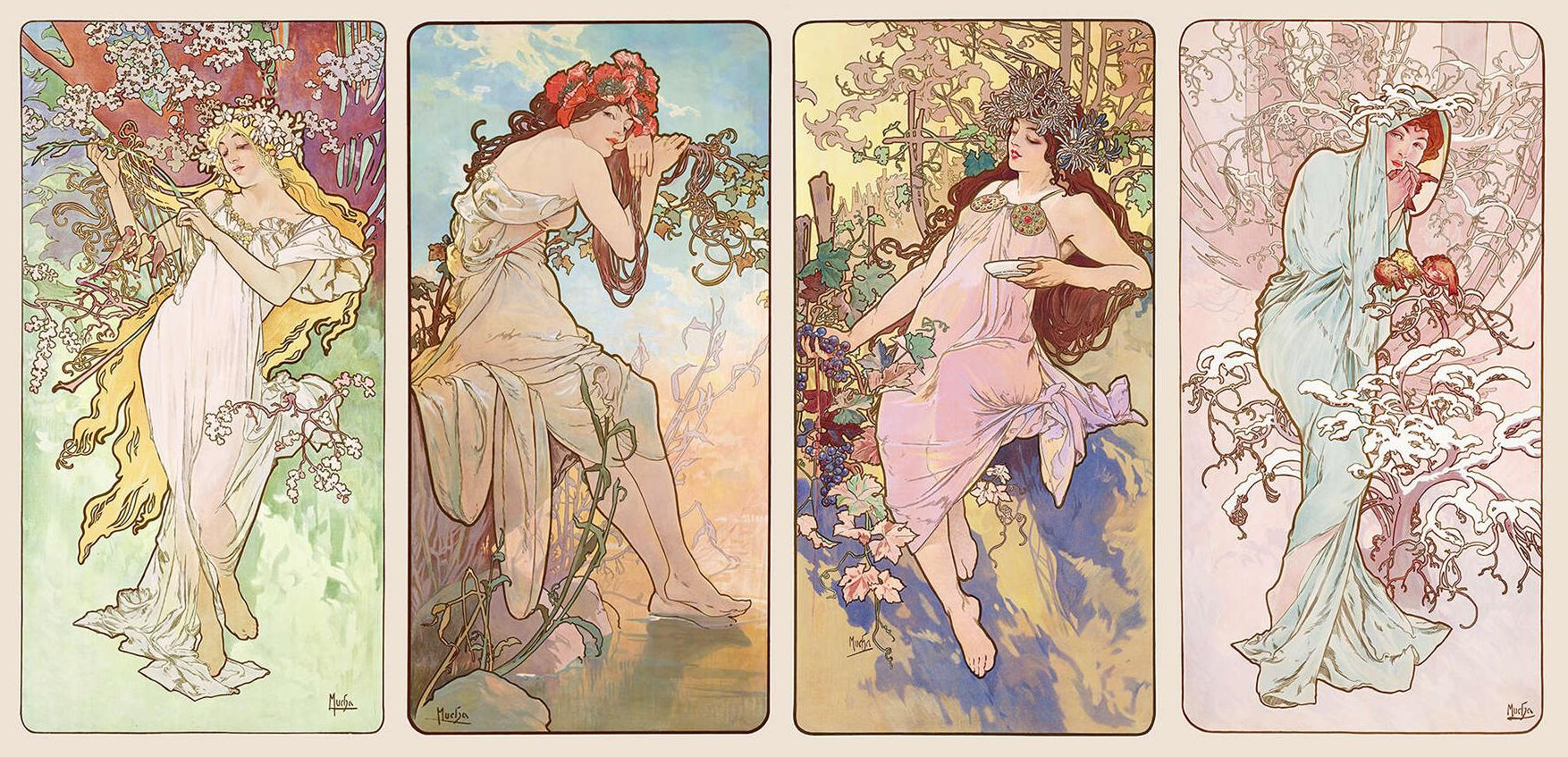
The Seasons (series), 1896, Alphonse Mucha

=== In East Asian art ===
Flowers in Chinese art are deeply symbolic, often representing virtues, philosophical ideals, and cultural beliefs. The plum blossom (梅花), for instance, is celebrated for its resilience and purity, blooming vibrantly amidst the harshness of winter. This enduring quality has made it a symbol of perseverance and hope, frequently depicted in traditional paintings to convey strength in adversity. Additionally, the plum blossom is recognized as one of the "Four Gentlemen" (四君子) in Chinese art, representing noble virtues alongside the orchid, bamboo, and chrysanthemum. In Japanese art, plum blossoms are frequently depicted to convey resilience and hope, resonating with cultural values that esteem endurance through hardships.

Similarly, the lotus flower (荷花) holds significant meaning, symbolizing purity and spiritual enlightenment. Emerging untainted from muddy waters, the lotus embodies the idea of transcending impurities, a concept deeply rooted in Buddhist philosophy. This symbolism is prevalent in various art forms, including paintings and sculptures, where the lotus often serves as a metaphor for inner beauty and moral integrity. Wu Bin's Lotus Out of Water (n.d.) presents a vivid depiction of a lotus flower emerging from the water, capturing the essence of purity and enlightenment associated with the lotus in Chinese symbolism. This artwork is housed in the Beijing Palace Museum and is noted as one of the oldest lotus paintings in its collection.

In Chinese ink painting, especially during the Tang and Song dynasties, the peony—regarded as the “King of Flowers”—became a symbol of wealth, nobility, and feminine grace. Artists such as Yun Shouping of the Qing dynasty used refined brushwork to capture its grandeur.

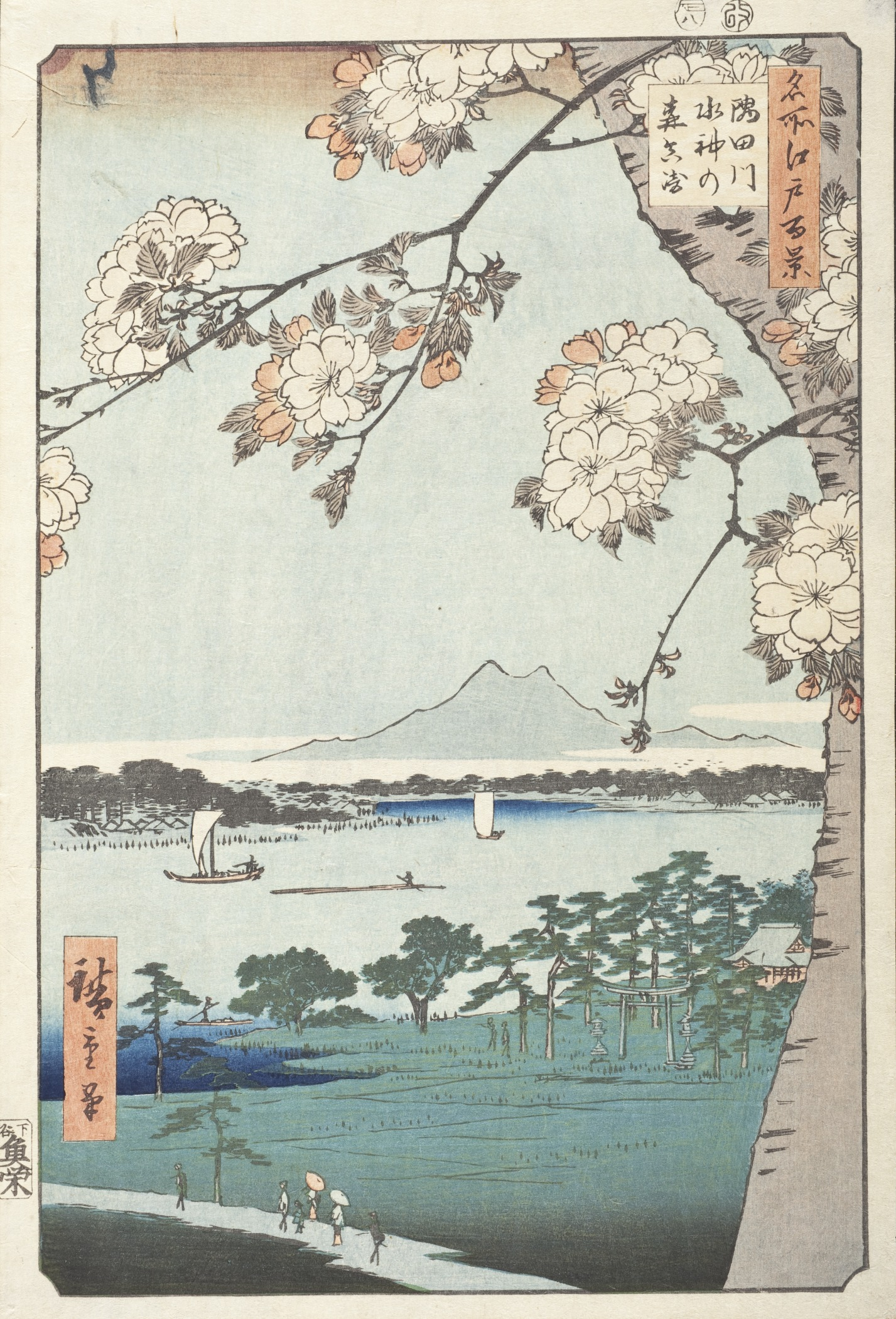
Sumida River, the Wood of the Water god, at Masaki, 1854–58, Utagawa Hiroshige

In Japanese culture, the language of flowers, known as Hanakotoba (花言葉), assigns specific meanings to various blooms, allowing for nuanced emotional expression through floral imagery. The cherry blossom (桜 or sakura), for example, epitomizes the transient nature of life due to its brief blooming period, reflecting the aesthetic principle of mono no aware, which appreciates the beauty of ephemeral things. This symbolism is deeply ingrained in Japanese art and literature, where cherry blossoms often evoke themes of mortality and the fleeting beauty of existence. In Japanese ukiyo-e woodblock prints, Utagawa Hiroshige frequently depicted cherry blossoms, emphasizing the fleeting nature of life—a visual interpretation of Buddhist impermanence.

=== In Islamic art ===
Flowers play a central role in Islamic art, where they often symbolize spiritual ideas, the transcendence of nature, and the concept of divine beauty. Due to the traditional prohibition against depicting sentient beings in religious contexts, Islamic artists developed highly stylized floral motifs, integrating them into intricate geometric and arabesque designs that adorn architecture, manuscripts, and decorative objects. These motifs are not merely ornamental—they serve as visual metaphors for the perfection and infinite nature of God.

One prominent example is the Alhambra Palace in Granada, Spain, where floral patterns are embedded into stucco carvings and glazed tile work, reflecting the Islamic worldview that nature mirrors divine order and harmony. Similarly, in Persian miniature painting, flowers such as the lotus and rose frequently appear as symbolic elements within spiritual and poetic narratives, representing purity, divine love, and enlightenment.

In Sufism, the mystical branch of Islam, floral imagery takes on even deeper meaning. The rose, in particular, is often used in Sufi poetry and visual symbolism to represent the divine beloved and the soul's longing for unity with God. This can be seen in the works of Rumi, where the rose becomes a recurring motif for mystical love and transcendence. Additionally, floral motifs in Islamic ceramics and textiles are not only valued for their beauty but also evoke an image of paradise, believed to be a garden in which flowers bloom eternally.

=== In Iranian culture ===
Flowers hold a special place in Iranian culture, symbolizing beauty, renewal, and spiritual harmony. In Persian poetry and art, they often represent love, purity, and the fleeting nature of life. The rose (gol-e sorkh) signifies love and divine beauty, appearing frequently in the works of Hafez and Saadi, while the tulip (laleh) symbolizes martyrdom and national pride, especially in modern Iran.

=== In modern and contemporary art ===
In modern and contemporary art, the language of flowers has been reimagined to convey a diverse array of themes, including beauty, decay, identity, and socio-political commentary. Artists have moved beyond traditional symbolism, utilizing floral imagery to explore complex human experiences and cultural narratives. For instance, street artist Banksy's 2003 mural Flower Thrower depicts a masked figure poised to throw a bouquet of flowers, juxtaposing the act of violence with a symbol of peace and hope. This work challenges viewers to reconsider notions of conflict and protest, suggesting that compassion can be a powerful agent for change.

Contemporary artists continue to reinterpret floral motifs to address current issues. For example, the exhibition "Forever is Now" held around the pyramids of Giza featured Shilo Shiv Suleman's installation Padma/Pulse and Bloom, consisting of giant lotus flowers. Drawing from both Eastern and Western symbolism, her work creates a space for connection and tranquility, seamlessly blending ancient Indian and Egyptian imagery.

Additionally, artists like Takashi Murakami have reimagined flowers in bold and colorful style. Murakami asserts that his flowers reflect the trauma and emotional complexity experienced in Japan following World War II.

== The language of flowers around the world ==
Though the language of flowers is popularly known through its romantic and Victorian roots, this practice is not new to other parts of the world. This said, there is no universally accepted set of meanings for flowers. Instead of a standardized symbolic system, floral symbolism functioned as a collection of associations, with interpretations varying between different books and sources. The books that compile floral vocabularies, often referred to as "language of flowers" books, belong to a broader category of sentimental flower literature. Unlike botanical or horticultural texts that focus on scientific classification or cultivation, these works emphasize the emotional and symbolic associations of flowers, reflecting themes of sentiment and personal meaning rather than practical uses.

Throughout history flowers have fascinated people, who have dedicated considerable effort to cultivating them, even without a clear practical benefit. Humans have seen symbolism in flowers. While some symbolic themes are common across cultures, many are not.

The significance of nature, particularly flowers, is evident even in prehistoric times, as shown by the discovery of flowers in ancient burial sites, where they were placed as part of rituals, reflecting their spiritual importance to early humans.

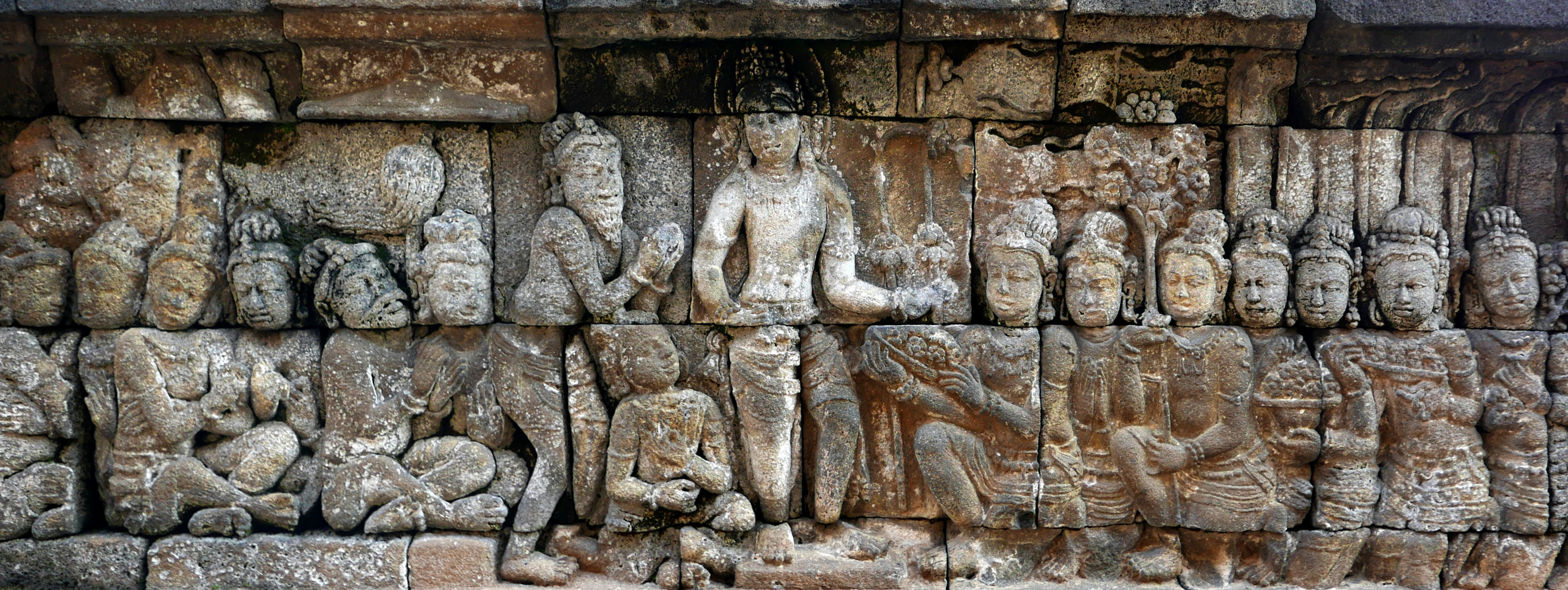
Relief on Level 4, Balustrade at Borobudur, Java, Indonesia

=== Cultural and religious nuances ===
When considering the relationship between humans and flowers through a cultural lens, it can be examined through the varied perceptual experiences that different flowers evoke. The way individuals within a specific culture process floral imagery and construct meanings around flowers is shaped by their sensory interpretations and cultural influences. Cultural interactions are often fluid, overlapping, and, at times, contradictory. Recognizing these complex relationships is essential, as the blending of different cultural elements can produce both ambiguous meanings and paradoxical effects, making the process of cultural exchange more intricate than it may initially appear.

Flowers have been used by cultures throughout history to express their perspectives on life. Flowers have been featured in mythology, symbolism, religion, art, literature, crafts, and industry. Flowers have long held a distinct place in human expression. This enduring fascination with flowers has given rise to a symbolic language that resonates across cultures worldwide.

=== Historical background across cultures ===
==== Ancient Egypt ====
The ancient Egyptians, known for their deep religiosity, expressed their reverence for nature through a profound appreciation for plants, particularly flowers. They are credited with the early tradition of associating flowers with the deceased, using them in burial rituals as a form of purification.

==== Judaism ====
In contrast, the Hebrews incorporated flowers into celebratory feasts, such as Shavuot, a festival of gratitude for a successful harvest, and the Feast of Tabernacles, marking the arrival of autumn.

==== Hinduism ====
In Hindu tradition, flowers are linked to the element of air or aether, while in China, where rituals hold great significance, Tantric-Taoist symbolism views flowers as a tool for spiritual enlightenment, representing inner transformation akin to the elixir of longevity.

==== Japan ====
Among floral traditions, Japanese Ikebana stands out as the highest form of symbolic floral arrangement. This art follows a ternary structure, where the tallest branch represents heaven, the middle branch signifies humanity, and the lowest branch symbolizes the earth, positioning man as the bridge between the two realms.

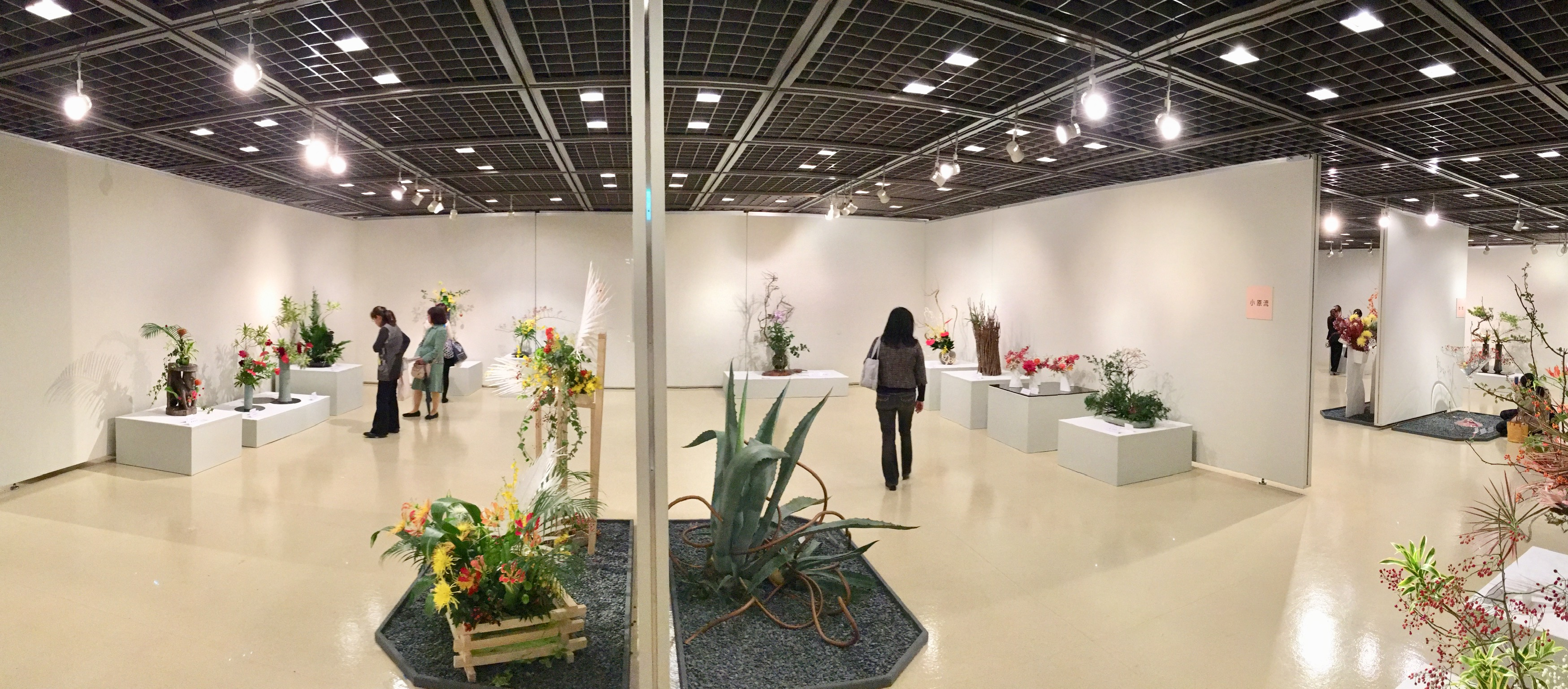
Nagoya Ikebana Art Exhibition Sakae

The development of Ikebana and Hanakotoba (the language of flowers) in Japan is deeply intertwined with religious and philosophical traditions, particularly Shinto and Buddhism. Both belief systems emphasize a profound respect for nature and its spiritual significance. In Shinto, all elements of the natural world are believed to possess a spirit or energy, reinforcing the idea that nature is alive and interconnected with human existence. This worldview likely contributed to the enduring presence of floral symbolism in Japanese culture and literature. Scholar Davis F. Hadland highlights this relationship, stating, “Take away their landscape, and you take away at once their sense of poetry, and, we may almost add, the floral side of their religion too, for the Japanese worship flowers and trees in a way utterly impossible to the more prosaic Westerner” (2014, p. 155).

==== Ancient Greece ====
The ancient Greeks, on the other hand, with their appreciation for aesthetics, celebrated flowers through art and architecture, immortalizing their beauty in mosaics, friezes, and vase paintings, where flowers were closely associated with joy and the pleasures of life. This love and appreciation for flowers is evident, especially in their mythology and literature, often tied to themes of transformation, life, and death. For example, Daphne, a nymph, turned into a laurel tree to escape Apollo, making the laurel a symbol of victory and divine favor. The pomegranate, linked to Persephone, held significance in the Underworld, representing the cycle of life and death.

Here are some notable flowers in Greek mythology:

Flower	Symbolism	Images
Laurel (Daphne)	Victory, prophecy, purification	
Rose	Love, passion, secrecy	
Narcissus	Self-absorption, death, renewal	
Violet	Fertility, love, Athens	
Hyacinth	Death, rebirth, athletic prowess	
Lily (Krinon)	Purity, motherhood	
Anemone	Death, forsaken love	
Iris	Communication with the gods, the rainbow	
Crocus	Love, awakening	
Poppy	Sleep, peace, fertility	
Myrtle	Love, marriage, peace	
Asphodel	Death, afterlife	
Pomegranate Blossoms	Marriage, fertility, and the underworld	

These flowers had a significant influence on Greek culture, leaving a visible mark in various forms. In art, they were commonly featured as prominent motifs on pottery dating back to the sixth century BCE. Red-figure vases, for instance, often depicted women holding wreaths of myrtle and rose in wedding scenes, while the Parthenon frieze showed maidens carrying flower baskets during religious processions.

=== Eastern vs. Western interpretations ===
A key distinction between Eastern and Western floral symbolism lies in the selection of flowers, which varies across cultures and complicates the idea of a universal floral language. In Western traditions, the rose is considered the "queen of flowers," while in China, the tree peony holds greater symbolic significance as the "king of flowers." In addition, in both China and Japan and many Buddhist countries, the lotus is the most significant religious flower symbol, closely associated with Buddha. Representing truth, perfection, and immortality (Koehn, Japanese Flower Symbolism), it frequently appears in depictions of Buddha and references to his teachings.

Flower	Eastern	Western	Images
Cherry Blossom	Loyalty, patriotism, a life lived joyfully	A good education	
Narcissus	Good fortune, happiness	Egoism	
Lotus	Purity, truth	eloquence	
Willow	Meekness, femininity, good luck	Melancholy	
Peony	Masculinity, brightness, prosperity	Boldness	
Pomegranate	fertility	fatuity	

(Clement; Koehn, Japanese Flower Symbolism; and Koehn, Chinese Flower Symbolism)

== In the 21st century ==
Floriography in the 21st century has been reduced but has been displayed in different ways. For example, tattoos of flowers and plants may carry symbolism and significance which relate to their historical meaning. The same can be said for jewelry designed and worn based on what the flowers represent. Floriography can still be found in traditional ways through bouquets, a common example of this would be the common practice of gifting red roses on Valentine's Day to represent love and romance and wearing poppies for remembrance. The gifting of flowers is not always personal, businesses and organizations may send floral arrangements to communicate professionalism and success. While the traditional use of floriography may have changed, the symbolism of flowers continues to provide a connection between humans and nature.

== See also ==
- Floral emblem
- Hanakotoba – Japanese flower language
- Plant symbolism
- Sub rosa
