= Jasmeen Patheja =

Indian activist

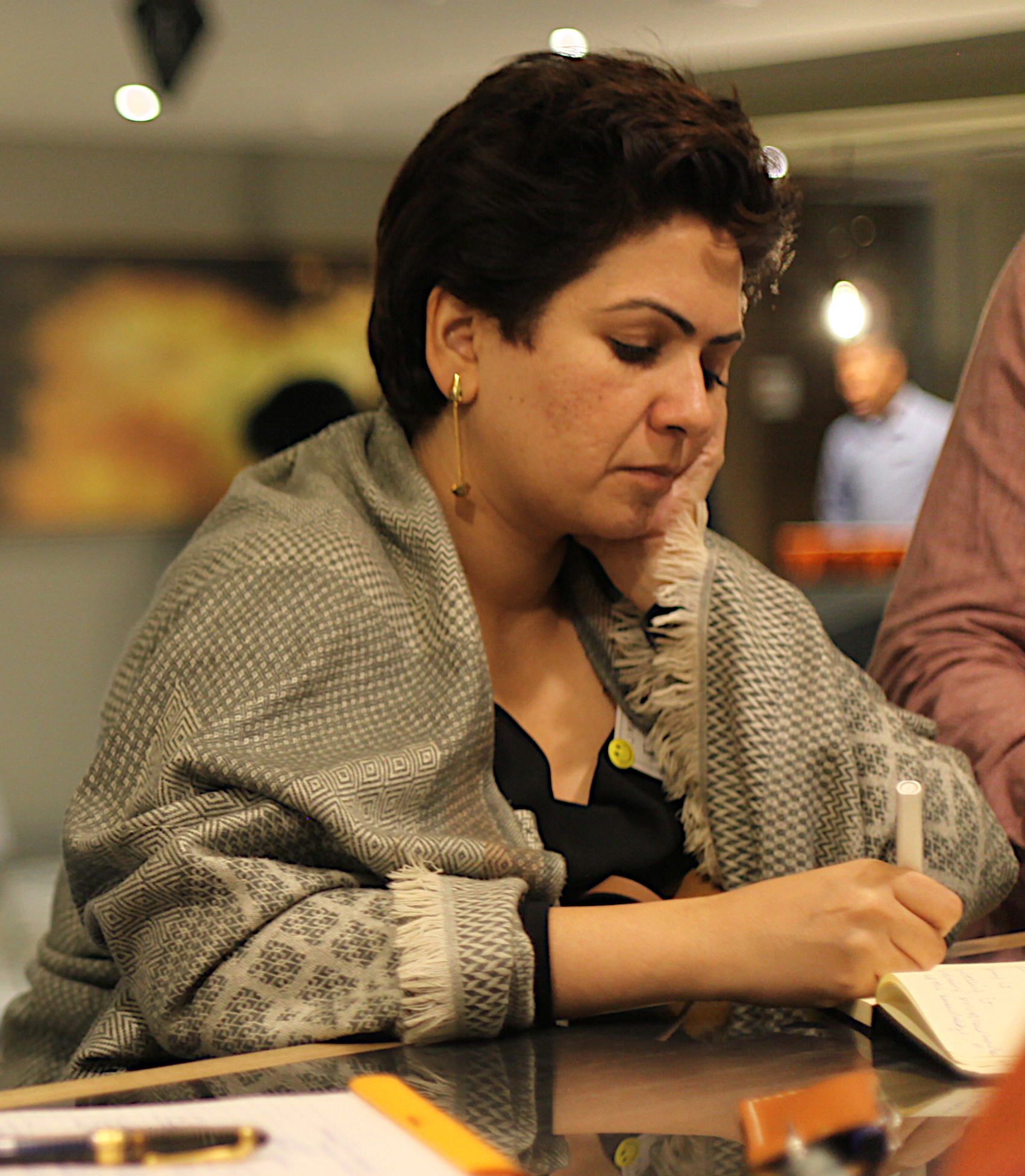
- Born: 11 November 1979 (age 47); Kolkata, West Bengal
- Education: Srishti Institute of Art Design and Technology
- Known for: Human Rights Activism; Pink Chaddi Campaign; Blank Noise

Jasmeen Patheja (born 11 November 1979) is a human rights activist in India and was born in Kolkata, West Bengal. She graduated from the Srishti School of Art Design and Technology in fine arts. She is a former Ashoka Fellow and works towards gender sensitization. She has been bringing attention to sexism and harassment in forms such as eve teasing, a form of sexual harassment that is very common in India. She established Blank Noise for the same purpose.

== Blank Noise ==
Jasmeen started the Blank Noise as a student project at Srishti in Bangalore in 2003. This has since spread out to other cities in India and globally. The purpose of Blank Noise was to create gender sensitisation regarding street harassment and eve teasing. The project exclusively works towards tackling gender-based violence. It intends to shift the blame of Eve teasing from victims to the perpetrators. It also provides legal counselling in case women want legal redressal for sexual harassment. It works on the ground with victims and is trying to suggest tougher laws against street harassment while improving on the existing ones. The project addresses the issue with innovative ways such as street performances and confrontational protests. Initially, Jasmeen started by going to Colleges but later came to the conclusion street activism would be more effective.

Jasmeen also uses new and mainstream media to spread awareness around the topic. She has created a blog that brings together diverse groups of people through discussions, questionnaires, testimonials, and photographs. People often volunteer to participate in Blank Noise's public performances and campaigns. Jasmeen has consciously sought new communities with which to collaborate, including youth groups, volunteers from slums, women bus conductors, police, and men.

== Personal life ==
Born in Kolkata, her family migrated to India from Burma in the 1960s. Her grandmother has been a strong influence in her life. She started engaging in activism during her time in college as an undergraduate student when she realized that street harassment was a systemic problem.

On 21 August 2011 she married London-based guru of Asian electronica, Talvin Singh in Gurdwara Jagat Sudhar on Rashbehari Avenue in Kolkata. She has been a TED and an Ashoka Fellow.
