= Eve teasing =

Euphemism for public sexual harassment or assault of women by men

In India, eve teasing is a euphemism, primarily occurring in Indian English, used for public sexual harassment or sexual assault of women by men. The name "Eve" alludes to the Bible's creation story concerning Adam and Eve. Considered a problem related to delinquency in male youth, it is a form of sexual aggression that ranges in severity from sexually suggestive remarks, brushing in public places and catcalls, to groping.

The Indian National Commission for Women has suggested that the expression serves only to trivialize the seriousness of the offence and should be replaced by a more appropriate term. They argue that, considering the semantic roots of the term in Indian English, Eve teasing refers to the temptress nature of Eve in Christian thought, and places the responsibility on the woman as an alluring tease.

As with most forms of personal harassment, sexual harassment is notoriously difficult to prove in a legal sense as perpetrators often devise intentionally discreet ways to harass women, although Eve teasing usually occurs in public spaces and streets and on public transport. Some guidebooks to the region warn female tourists to avoid attracting the attention of these kinds of men by wearing modest, conservative clothing. However, this form of harassment has been reported by both Indian and foreign women in conservative dress.

== History ==
The problem first received public and media attention in India in the 1970s. In the following decades, more and more women started attending college and working independently, meaning that they were often no longer accompanied by a male escort as had been the norm in traditional society. In response, the problem grew to alarming proportions, despite this not being the case in other cultures where women come and go as they please. Soon the Indian government had to take remedial measures, both judicial and law enforcement, to curb the practice. Efforts were made to sensitise the police about the issue, and police started to round up Eve teasers. The deployment of plain-clothed female police officers for the purpose has been particularly effective. Other measures taken in various states by the police were setting up of dedicated women's helplines in various cities, police stations staffed by women, and special police cells.

Also seen during this period was a marked rise in the number of women coming forward to report cases of sexual harassment, due to changing public opinion against this practice. In addition, the severity of these incidents grew as well, in some cases leading to acid throwing, which in turn led to states like Tamil Nadu making it a non-bailable offence. The number of women's organisations and those working for women's rights also increased, and during this period reports of bride burning increased. The increase in the number of violent incidents involving women meant previously lackadaisical attitudes towards women's rights had to be revised and supported by law. In the coming years, certain organisations played a key role in lobbying for the passing of legislation designed to protect women from aggressive behaviour from strangers, including 'The Delhi Prohibition of Eve-teasing Bill 1984'.

The death of a female student, Sarika Shah, in Chennai in 1998, resulted in some tough laws to counter the problem in South India. After murder charges were brought, about a half-dozen reports of suicide have been attributed to pressures caused by this behaviour. In February 2009, female students from Maharaja Sayajirao University (MSU) in Vadodara assaulted four young men near the family and community sciences faculty, after the men made lewd comments about a girl student staying in SD Hall hostel.

Many other cases go unreported for fear of reprisals and exposure to public shame. In some cases police let the offenders go, after public humiliation through the murga punishment. In 2008, a Delhi court ordered a 19-year-old caught making lewd remarks to passing females to distribute 500 handbills to youngsters outside schools and colleges detailing the consequences of indecent conduct.

== Depiction in popular culture ==
Some depictions in Indian cinema shows mild teasing as a part of flirtatious beginnings of a courtship, along with the usual accompaniment of song and dance routines, which invariably results in the heroine submitting to the hero's advances towards the end of the song. Young men may try to emulate the example depicted so flawlessly on screen; the term roadside Romeos even made it to film in Roadside Romeo (2007).

It also has been frequently depicted that when a girl is teased in this way, the hero will come and beat the perpetrator up in order to protect her and 'defend her honour', such as in the Telugu films Madhumasam, Magadheera and Eega, and also the Hindi film Wanted. Nowadays, this issue is also featured in Indian television soaps like Savdhaan India and Crime Patrol.

== Legal redress ==
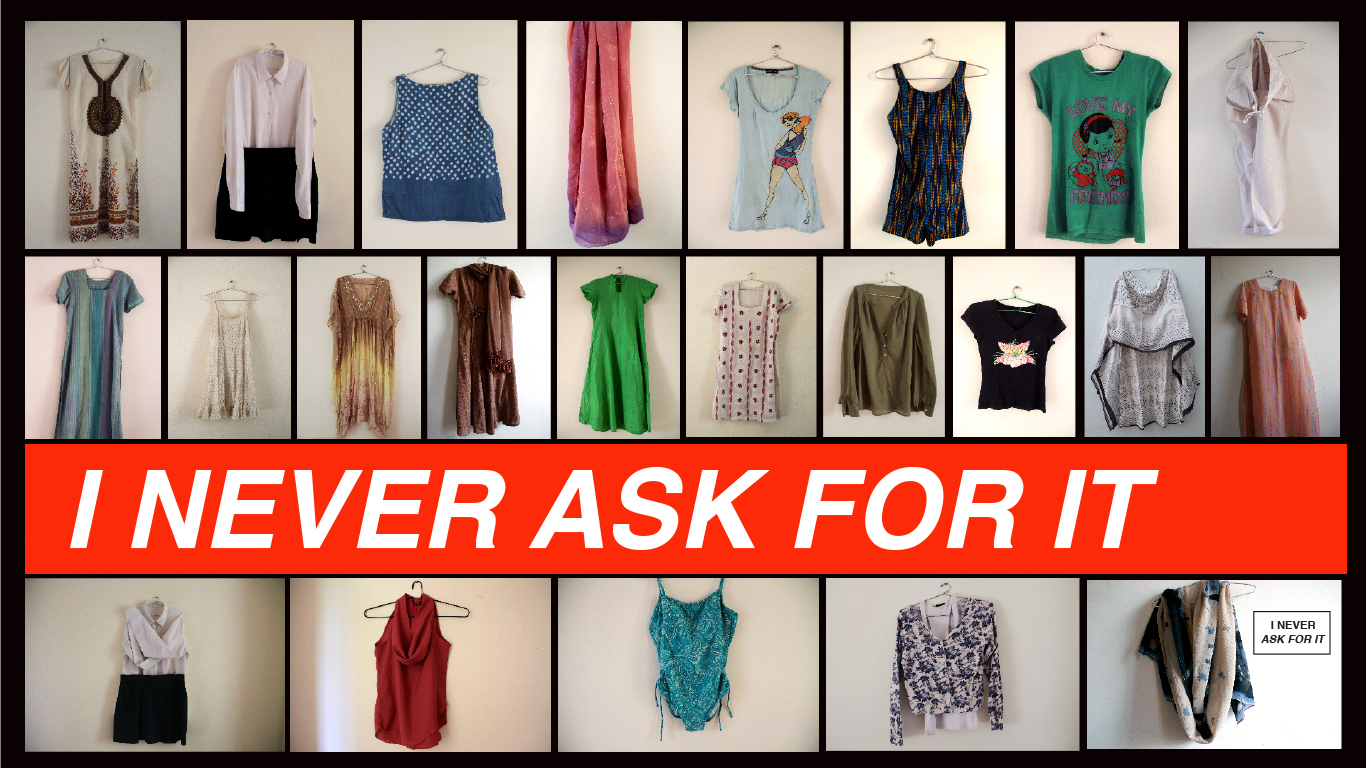
Campaign "I Never Ask for It", organised by Blank Noise, that addresses eve teasing and violence justified through blame, across spaces and as experienced by multiple identities of women in India

Although Indian law does not use the term Eve teasing, victims earlier usually seek recourse through Section 294 of the Indian Penal Code, which sentences a man found guilty of making a girl or woman the target of obscene gestures, remarks, songs or recitation to a maximum jail sentence of three months. Section 292 of the IPC clearly spells out that showing pornographic or obscene pictures, books or papers to a woman or girl results in a fine of ₹2,000 (US$21) with two years' imprisonment for first offenders. In the case of a repeated offense, the offender may have a fine of ₹5,000 (US$52) with five years' imprisonment imposed. Under Section 509 of the IPC, obscene gestures, indecent body language and negative comments directed at any woman or girl or exhibiting any object which intrudes upon the privacy of a woman, carries a penalty of imprisonment for one year or a fine or both. The Criminal Law (Amendment) Act, 2013 introduced changes to the Indian Penal Code, making sexual harassment an expressed offence under Section 354 A, which is punishable up to three years of imprisonment and or with fine. The Amendment also introduced new sections making acts like disrobing a woman without consent, stalking and sexual acts by person in authority an offense. It also made acid attacks a specific offence with a punishment of imprisonment not less than 10 years and which could extend to life imprisonment and with fine.

The National Commission for Women (NCW) also proposed No 9. Eve Teasing (New Legislation) 1988. The Indian Parliament has passed the Sexual Harassment of Women at Workplace (Prevention, Prohibition and Redressal) Act, 2013, which adds protections for female workers in most workplaces. The Act came into force from 9 December 2013.

== Public response ==
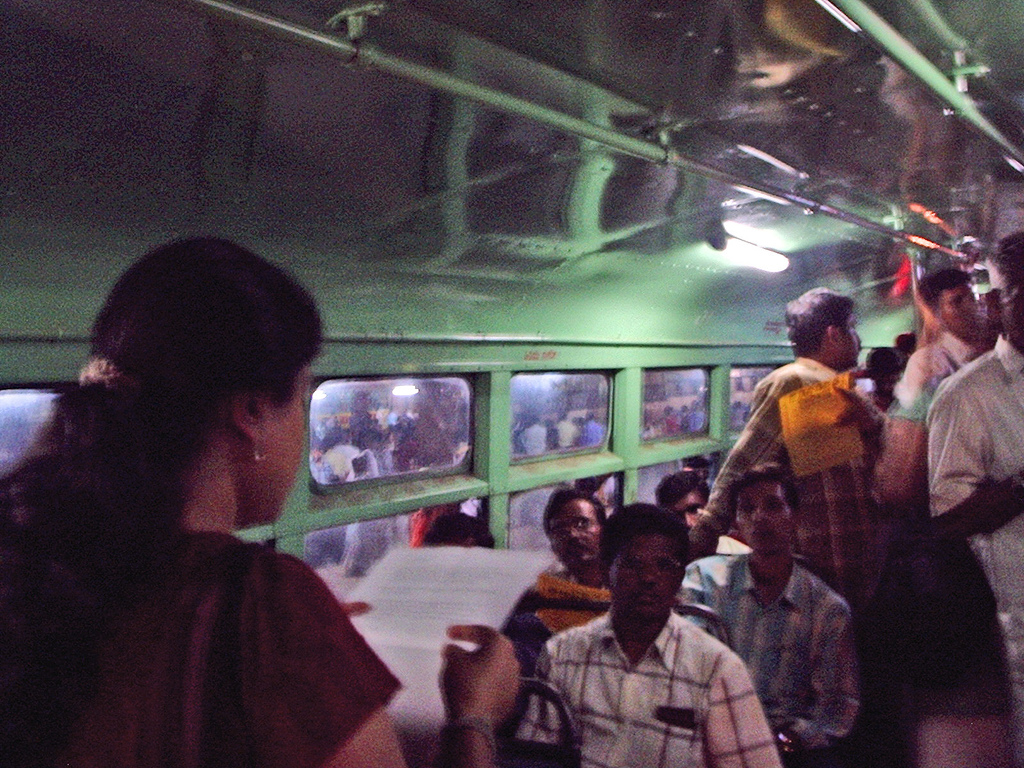
The Blank Noise Project's intervention on Majestic bus stand, against Eve teasing

Nirbhaya Karnataka ("Fearless Karnataka") is a coalition of many individuals and groups including Alternative Law Forum, Blank Noise, Maraa, Samvada and Vimochana. After the rise of eve teasing cases in the 2000s, it organised several public awareness campaigns, including Take Back the Night, followed by another public art project titled, The Blank Noise Project, starting in Bengaluru in 2003. A similar programme to fight eve-teasing was also hosted in Mumbai in 2008.

In Delhi, one of India's most dangerous cities for women, the Department of Women and Child Development established a steering committee in 2009 to prepare the city for the Commonwealth Games to be held in 2010. In Mumbai, "Ladies Special" train compartments have been introduced to allow women to travel without the fear of being sexually harassed. Given that the number of women needing to travel has doubled since 1995, there is a very strong demand for these kinds of services. Today "Ladies Special" compartments are present in most local trains in big cities. The Delhi Metro also has exclusive women-only cars.

Starting in 2017, the Drukpa nuns of Amitabha, known as the "Kung Fu Nuns", started teaching women's self-defence training for the Ladakh/Himalayan towns, the first class being held at Hemis Monastery. While the sisters were performing rescue work after the 2015 Gorkha earthquake, they heard many stories of young women being sent away for better opportunities but ending up in sex slavery; these same small villages high in the Himalayas were also vulnerable to banditry. As part of their outreach, the nuns seek to strengthen women's safety, position and value in their communities by teaching new skills, including self-defence and vocational training.

Eve teasing is highly criticised by the media and on social media websites such as Facebook.

== See also ==
- 2012 Delhi gang rape and murder
- Besharmi Morcha
- Blank Noise
- Dekh Le
- Feminism in India
- Gender inequality in India
- Groping
- Human rights in India
- Pink Chaddi Campaign
- Rape culture
- Rape during the Bangladesh Liberation War
- Rape in India
- Rape in Pakistan
- Rohtak sisters viral video controversy
- Sexual abuse by yoga gurus
- SlutWalk
- An Open Letter to Honey Singh
- Moral Police
