= The Fearless Collective =

- Formation: December 2012
- Type: Women's organization
- Purpose: Art-Activism
- Website: fearlesscollective.org///

Fearless Collective is an art collective. It uses participatory art practices to provide means to move from fear to love in public space. The collective uses visual campaigning, multimedia storytelling and large-scale public art projects to engage in participative storytelling with communities who have been misrepresented around the world; to make space for personal narratives to emerge, transform public space, and reclaim our imaginations from fear.

== Formation ==
Fearless was started in 2012 by Bangalore based visual artist Shilo Shiv Suleman in response to the media fear-mongering and patriarchal discourse on sexual violence and women’s right to access public space in India. Since then, the collective has grown into a global, core team of women artists and activists who use affirmation and art as acts of protest by responding to moments of crisis through creating beauty in public space. To date, Fearless Collective has worked with hundreds of community members in 16 countries to co-create 49 large scale public art installations largely in the Global South. Fearless Collective is financially sponsored by U.S. 501(c)(3) Social Good Fund. Nida Mushtaq, sexual rights activist is part of collective from Pakistan, who drew murals of transgender community.

With the aim of promoting the work of Kashmiri artisans and recognizing the substantial contributions of women in the artistic realm, Zoya Khan, an architect-artist who leads the international organization Fearless Collective, has revealed a groundbreaking mural in Srinagar.
