= Wendy Coburn =

Canadian sculptor and educator

- Born: December 31, 1963; Burlington, Ontario, Canada
- Died: June 15, 2015 (aged 51); Toronto, Ontario, Canada
- Education: OCAD University, Concordia University
- Known for: sculptor, photographer, video artist
- Notable work: Anatomy of a Protest (2014)

Wendy Coburn (1963–2015) was a Canadian artist and professor at the Ontario College of Art and Design University. She is known for her sculptures and for her video-based show "Anatomy of a Protest" (2014).

== Education ==
Coburn studied at Dundas Valley School of Art and received an associate degree from the Ontario College of Art in 1985. In 1997, she completed her MFA at Concordia University.

== Artistic career ==
Coburn initially gained notice for her sculptural works that explored lesbian life and sexuality. In a 2000 show at the Oakville Galleries, her sculpture Leda and the Beaver, a bronze tribute to Joyce Wieland and the myth of Leda and the Swan, generated controversy with its visual pun.

In 2014, Coburn had her first major exhibition of video work, Anatomy of a Protest in Toronto at the Justina M. Barnicke Gallery, curated by Barbara Fischer. Alongside several photographs and sculptural works, it featured Slut Nation: Anatomy of a Protest. This video documented the world's first Slutwalk protest initiated in 2011 after Toronto Constable Michael Sanguinetti reportedly stated, "Women should avoid dressing like sluts in order not to be victimized." The film depicted agents provocateurs from the Toronto police department, and examined the role of image making and manipulation within and against protest movements. The exhibition was positively reviewed in The Toronto Star, Canadian Art, and Magenta Magazine.

Coburn was a key participant in the creation of OCAD U's Art and Social Change minor. Wendy developed the groundbreaking course "Making Gender: LBGTQ Studio" which seeks to foster a greater awareness and understanding of lesbian, gay, bisexual, transgender and queer cultures and subcultures. Visitors to OCAD U can witness her impact upon students by visiting the "Yellow Staircase Project" at 100 McCaul.

In 2013, Wendy was named the first recipient of the BLG Faculty Equity Award for her outstanding contribution to promoting an inclusive work and learning environment at OCAD U. In addition, she was appointed a Fellow of the Mark S. Bonham Centre for Sexual Diversity Studies at the University of Toronto.

Coburn died in 2015. Shortly after, OCAD University created the Wendy Coburn Scholarship for Social Change in her memory.
