= Blank Noise =

Indian community project

- Commercial?: No
- Type of project: Community, Public art
- Location: India
- Founder: Jasmeen Patheja
- Established: 2003
- Website: blanknoise.org

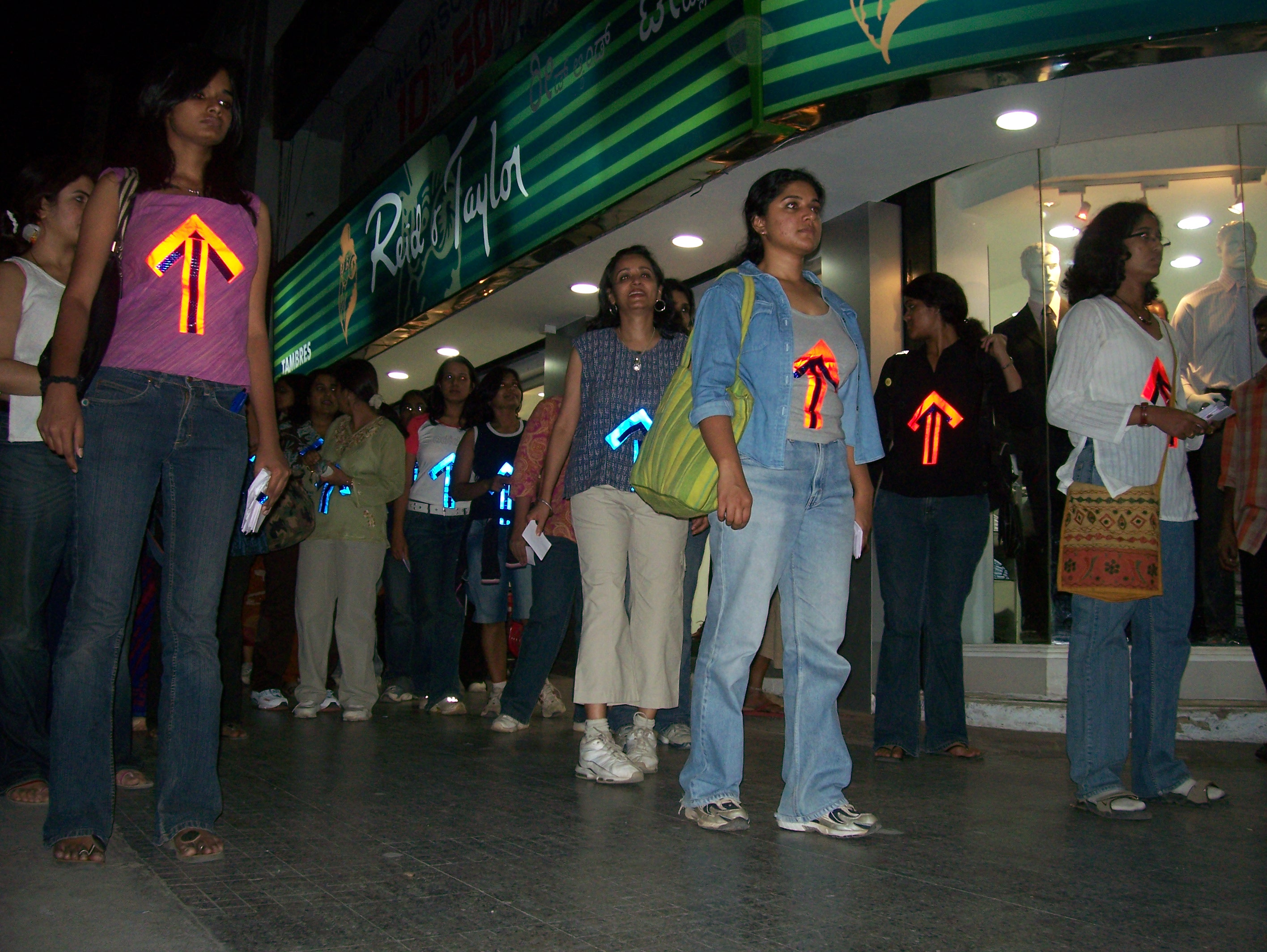
Blank Noise, Walk the Night (similar to Reclaim the night, Bangalore on 8 March 2007

Blank Noise is a community/public art project that seeks to confront street harassment, commonly known as eve teasing, in India. The project, initiated by Jasmeen Patheja in August 2003, started as a student project at Srishti School of Art Design and Technology in Bangalore and has since spread to other cities in India.

== Activities ==
Blank Noise is led and run completely by volunteers. A core team of male and female volunteers from across geographical locations and age groups work with the collective. Blank Noise seeks to trigger public dialogue on the issue of street sexual harassment. Conversations range from collectively building a definition of "eve-teasing" to defining the boundaries of "teasing", "harassment", "flirting". The collective builds testimonials of street sexual violence, harassment and "eve-teasing" and disperses them back in public, thereby creating public debate.

It addresses women's fear based relationship with their cities via direct street action and public interventions, which ask women to be "Action Heroes" by not being idle in public. They are referred to as Blank Noise Guys. Blank Noise works towards an attitudinal shift towards 'eve-teasing' and involves the public to take collective responsibility of the issue.

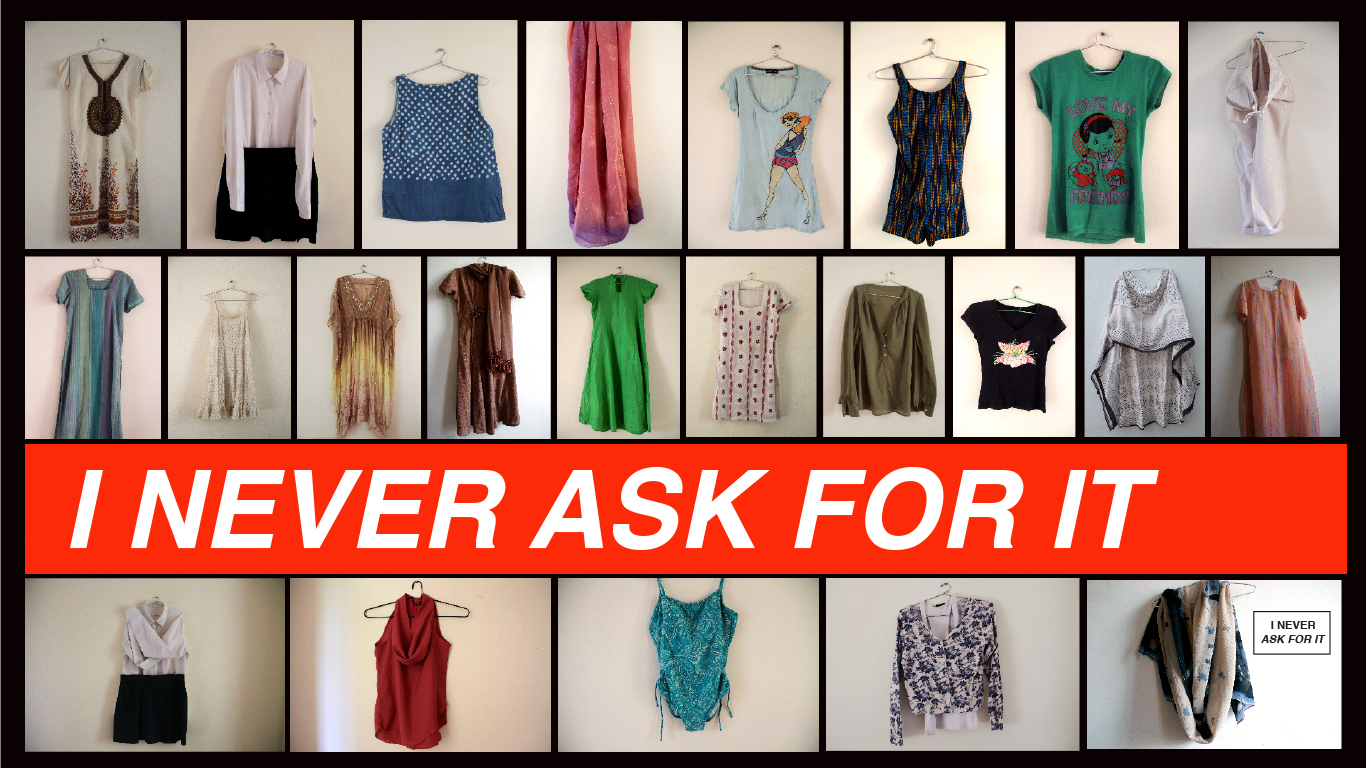
Poster of the campaign "I Never Ask For It".

Though Blank Noise was founded in Bangalore, it has spread to other cities such as Mumbai, Delhi, Chennai, Calcutta, Chandigarh, Hyderabad, and Lucknow. It tackles the notion of shame and blame through campaigns such as "I never ask for it" (asking to be sexually harassed when on the streets). A major notion that it seeks to dispel is that women get harassed because of the clothing they wear. Through street actions and dialogue, Blank Noise hopes to achieve its aims of achieving a safe and free environment for women on the streets, and enable society to become more egalitarian towards women in general.

In December 2012, following the brutal gang rape of a young woman in a moving bus in Delhi, Blank Noise started the Safe City Pledge, an initiative urging citizens to pledge ways in which they can make cities safer for women.

The project has undertaken actions such as spray painting messages, recording the testimonies of victims of sexual harassment in public places, and printing tee shirts with anti-harassment messages on them. It has also staged demonstrations.

== See also ==
- Priya's Shakti
- Rape in India
- Sexism in India
- Slut-shaming
- Victim blaming
- Women in India
