= Hanakotoba =

Japanese form of the language of flowers

Hanakotoba (花言葉) is the Japanese form of the language of flowers. Hanakotoba is much like the Victorian language of flowers, floriography, but with the associated symbolism specific to Japanese history and culture. The language was meant to convey emotion and communicate directly to the recipient or viewer without needing the use of words.

== Flowers and their meanings ==
Japanese name	Romaji	English	Meaning	Image
アマリリス	Amaririsu	Amaryllis	Shy	Amaryllis belladonna
アネモネ	Anemone	Anemone (white)	Sincere	Anemone narcissifolia
アムブロシアー	Amuburoshiā	Ambrosia	Pious	Ambrosia
紫苑	Shion	Aster tataricus	Remembrance	Aster tataricus
躑躅	Tsutsuji	Azalea	Patient, modest	Azalea
ブルーベル	Burūberu	Bluebell	Grateful	Common bluebell
サボテン	Saboten	Cactus	Lust, sex	Cactus flower
赤 椿	Aka Tsubaki	Camellia (red)	In love, perishing with grace	Camellia japonica
黄色い椿	Kiiroi Tsubaki	Camellia (yellow)	Longing	Camellia japonica alba pena
白椿	Shiro Tsubaki	Camellia (white)	Waiting	Camellia japonica nobilissima
黒百合	Kuroyuri	Fritillaria camschatcensis	Love, curse	Fritillaria camschatcensis
カーネーション	Kānēshon	Carnation	Fascination, distinction, love	Carnation
桜	Sakura	Cherry blossom	Kind, gentle, transience of life	Cherry blossom
黄菊	Kigiku	Chrysanthemum (yellow)	Imperial	Yellow chrysanthemum
白菊	Shiragiku	Chrysanthemum (white)	Truth	Chrysanthemums
(四つ葉の) クローバー	(Yotsuba no) kurōbā	Four-leaf clover	Lucky	Four-leaf clover
水仙	Suisen	Daffodil	Respect	Daffodil
天竺牡丹	Tenjikubotan	Dahlia	Good taste	Dahlia
雛菊	Hinagiku	Daisy	Faith	Daisy
エーデルワイス	Ēderuwaisu	Edelweiss	Courage, power	Edelweiss
エリカ	Erika	Erica	Solitude	Erica
勿忘草	Wasurenagusa	Forget-me-not	True love	Forget-me-not
フリージア	Furiijia	Freesia	Childish, immature	Freesia
梔子	Kuchinashi	Gardenia	Secret love	Gardenia
鷺草	Sagisō	Habenaria radiata	Purity, delicateness, "My thoughts will follow you into your dreams."	Habenaria radiata
ハイビースカス	Haibiisukasu	Hibiscus	Gentle	Hibiscus
忍冬	Suikazura	Honeysuckle	Generous	Honeysuckle
紫陽花	Ajisai	Hydrangea	Pride	Hydrangea
菖蒲, アイリス	Ayame, Airisu	Iris	Good news, glad tidings, loyalty	Iris
茉莉花/素馨, ジャスミン	Matsurika/Sokei, Jasumin	Arabian jasmine/Spanish jasmine, Jasmine	Friendly, graceful	Jasmine
ラベンダー	Rabendā	Lavender	Faithful	Lavender
白百合	Shirayuri	Lily (white)	Purity, chastity	White lily
アルストロメリア	Arusutoromeria	Lily of the Incas (Alstroemeria)	Such strong connection that language is limited when trying to explain it	Alstroemeria (Lily of the Incas)
オレンジユリ	Orenji Yuri	Lily (Orange)	Energy, joy of life, enthusiasm, vitality, comfort	Orange lily
鈴蘭/百合	Suzuran/Yuri	Lily of the Valley/Spider lily	Sweet	Lily of the Valley
鬼百合	Oniyuri	Tiger lily	Hate, revenge	Tiger lily
彼岸花/曼珠沙華	Higanbana/Manjushage	Red spider lily	Never to meet again, lost memory, abandonment	Red spider lily
向日葵	Himawari	Sunflower	Respect, passionate love, radiance	Sunflower
蓮華	Renge	Lotus	Far from the one he loves, purity, chastity	Lotus
木蓮, マグノリア	Mokuren, Magunoria	Magnolia	Natural	Magnolia
宿り木/ホーリー	Yadorigi/Hōrii	Mistletoe/Holly	Looking for love	Holly
朝顔	Asagao	Morning glory	Willful promises	Morning glory
水仙	Suisen	Narcissus	Self-esteem	Narcissus
パンジー	Panjii	Pansy	Thoughtful, caring	Pansy
牡丹	Botan	Peony	Bravery	Peony
雛芥子	Hinageshi	Poppy (red)	Fun-loving	Red poppy
芥子(白)	Keshi(shiro)	Poppy (white)	Rejoice	White poppy
芥子(黄)	Keshi(ki)	Poppy (yellow)	Success	Yellow poppy
桜草	Sakurasō	Primrose	Desperate	Primrose
紅薔薇	Benibara	Rose (red)	Love, in love	Red rose
薔薇	Bara	Rose (white)	Innocence, silence, devotion	White rose
黄色薔薇	Kiiroibara	Rose (yellow)	Jealousy	Yellow rose
桃色バラ	Momoirobara	Rose (pink)	Trust, happiness, confidence	Pink rose
スイートピー	Suiitopii	Sweet pea	Goodbye	Sweet pea
チューリップ	Chūrippu	Tulip (red)	Fame, charity, trust	Red tulip
チューリップ	Chūrippu	Tulip (yellow)	One-sided love	Yellow tulip
美女桜	Bijozakura	Verbena	Cooperative	Verbena
菫	Sumire	Violet	Honesty	Violet
百日草	Hyakunichisou	Zinnia	Loyalty	Zinnia

== See also ==
- Language of flowers
- Ikebana
- Plant symbolism
