= Mamta Sagar =

Indian poet and translator

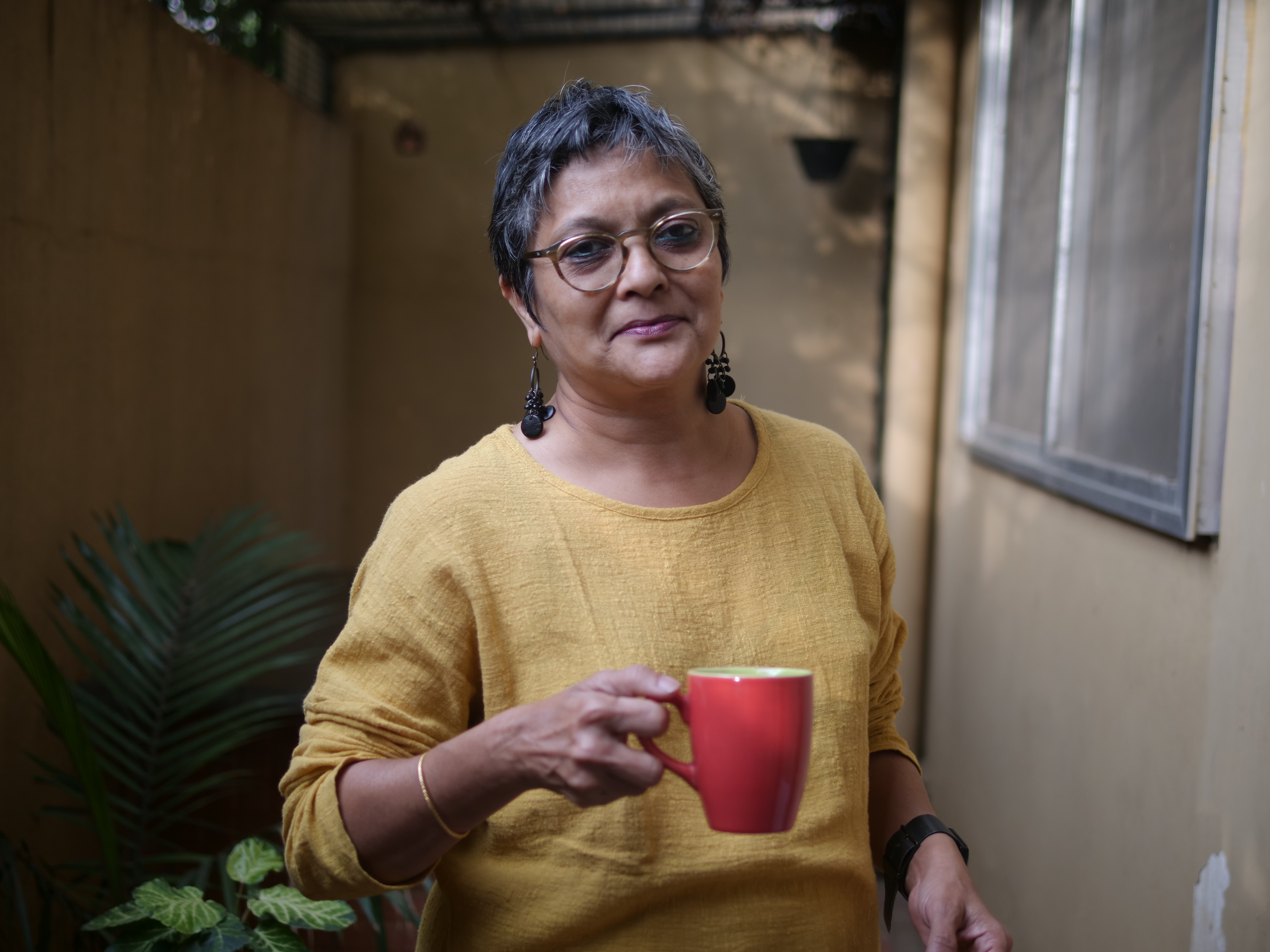
- Sagar in 2018
- Occupations: Writer, translator
- Years active: 1992–present

Mamta Sagar is an Indian poet, academic, and activist writing in the Kannada language. Her writings focus on identity politics, feminism, and issues around linguistic and cultural diversity. She is a professor of academic and creative writing at Srishti Institute of Art Design and Technology. In 2024, Sagar won the World Literary Prize, conferred by the World Organization of Writers.

== Work ==
Sagar has translated poetry, prose, and critical writings into Kannada and English. Her own poems have been translated into many languages, and have been included in textbooks from Jain University, Bangalore and the University of Kerala. Some of her poems are accompanied by music by Vasu Dixit. Bindumalini, and Sunitha Ananthaswamy.

Sagar produced Interversions 1,2, & 3, three poetry films based on her own collection of the same name, with Srishti Films as part of the Wales-India collaborative projects (2018). She has also written and produced For Gauri, a video presentation of her poem written for Gauri Lankesh.

Sagar has curated international and national poetry and theater events in Hyderabad and Bangalore, including Kaavya Sanje, a multilingual community poetry event at the Bangalore Literature Festival. She is also involved in international poetry translation projects.

== Bibliography ==
- Kaada Navilina Hejje (Footprints of the Wild Peacock) – 1992
- Chukki Chukki Chandakki – 1993
- Nadiya Neerina Teva (Dampness of the River) – 1999
- Hiige Haaleya Maile Haadu (Like This the song) – 2007
- Growing Up as a Woman Writer – 2007
- MahiLa Vishaya – 2007
- Illi Salluva Maatu – 2010
- Hide & Seek – 2014
- kShaNabindu – 2018
- Interversions (compilation)

=== Translation work ===
- Poems by Tirumalamba
- The Swing of Desire – the play Mayye Bhaara Manave Bhaara
- Seemantha (2003) – short story by Nagaveni
- 870 (2011) – by Emily Dickinson
- Slovenian-Kannada Literature Interactions (2011)
- Beyond Barriers: Slovenian-Kannada Literature Interactions (2011)
- Slovenian-Kannada Literature Interactions (2011)
- Preetiya Nalavattu NiyamagaLu (2017) – novel by Elif Shafak
