= Flora Symbolica =

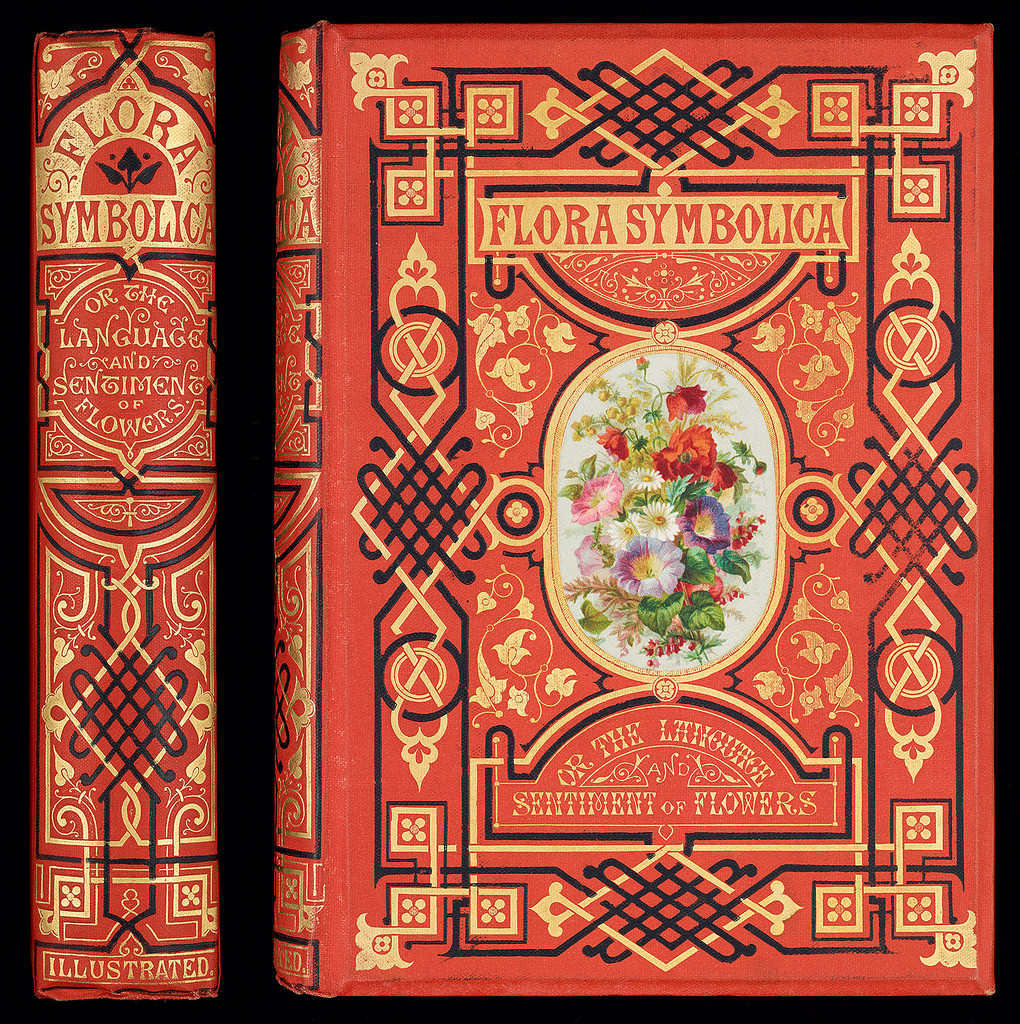
- Cover of Flora Symbolica
- Author: John Henry Ingram
- Original title: Flora Symbolica; or, the Language and Sentiment of Flowers
- Publication date: 1869

Flora Symbolica or Flora Symbolica; or, the Language and Sentiment of Flowers is a book written by John Henry Ingram and published in London in 1869 during the Victorian era.

It is the first book published by Ingram, it includes the history of the floriography, an examination of the meaning and symbology of more than one hundred flowers, and it gives anecdotes, floral vocabulary, and sentimental material for each flower.

To date it has been shown several exhibitions about this topic.
