= Srishti Manipal Institute of Art, Design and Technology =

Art school in Bengaluru, India

- Type: Private
- Established: 1996
- Founder: Geetha Narayanan
- Faculty: 150
- Location: Bangalore, Karnataka, India; 13°6′6.1″N 77°35′0.9″E
- Campus: Suburban
- Website: srishtimanipalinstitute.in

The Srishti Manipal Institute of Art, Design and Technology, (formerly Srishti School of Art, Design and Technology), is a multi-disciplinary design school established in 1996 by Geetha Narayanan in Bangalore, India. It offers courses in digital video production, film, visual communication, experimental media arts, design in education, textile design, animation and visual effects, interaction design, product and interface design, and business systems and design.

== Approach ==
Srishti has a number of centres and labs that offer practice- and research-based environments for students and faculty from a multitude of disciplines.

== Notable projects ==
- Namma Nagara Project (2013): the college was among five educational art institutions, including Bangalore University, College of Fine Arts, Bengaluru, Kalamandir School of Art, and Ken School of Art, that collaborated with Namma Metro for the Namma Nagara Project, which aimed to adorn numerous spaces along MG Road Metro boulevard with the students' creative works.
- Blank Noise
- The JALDI Innovation Lab, Vidhi, in collaboration with Srishti, put together a report that addresses infrastructural and accessibility issues in courts and tribunals.

== Notable faculty ==
- Mamta Sagar
- Nina Sabnani
- Yashas Shetty

== Notable alumni ==
- Jasmeen Patheja
- Shilo Shiv Suleman
