= Shilo Shiv Suleman =

Indian artist (born 1989)

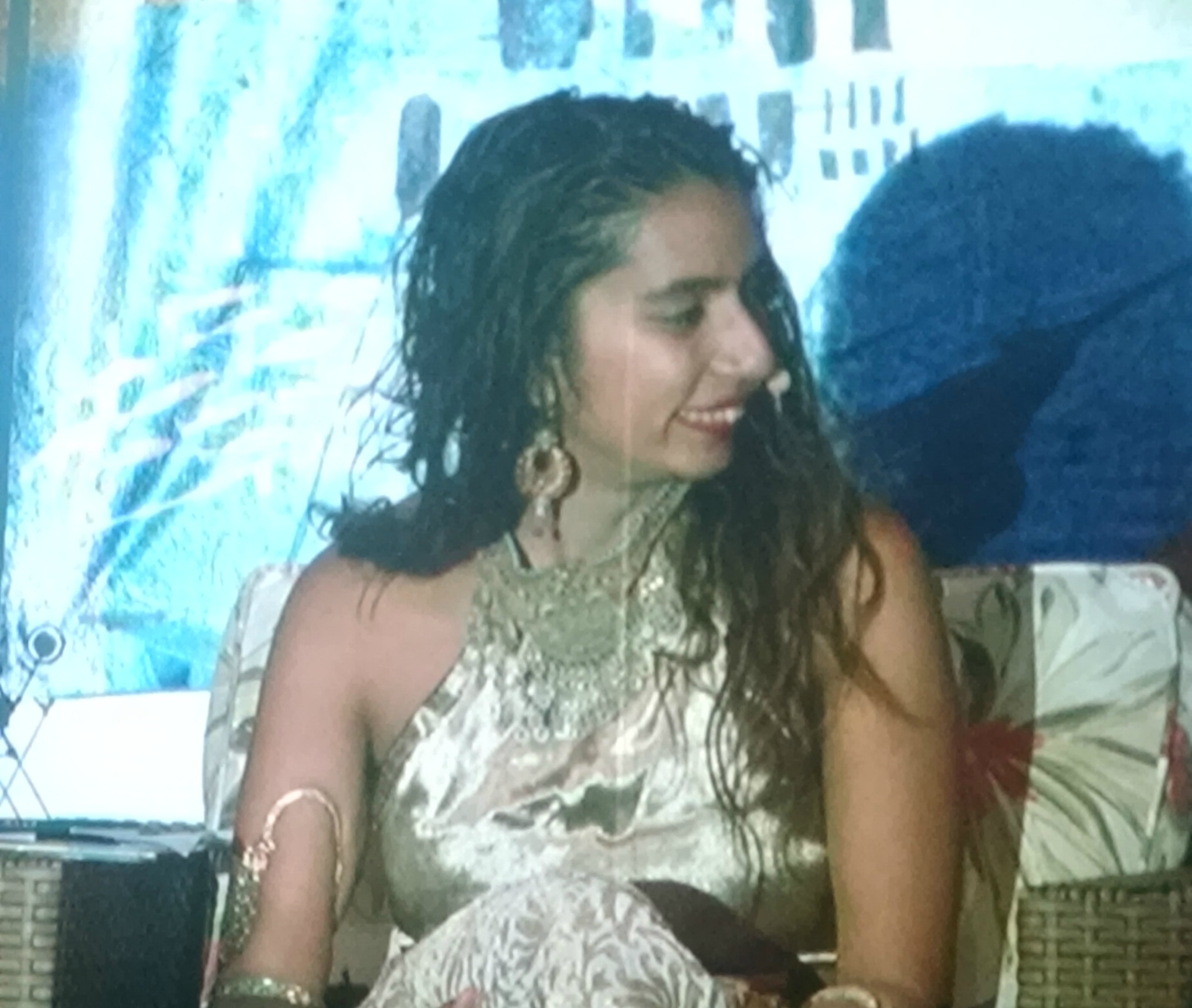
- Born: 1989 (age 36–37); Bengaluru, Karnataka, India
- Education: Srishti School of Art, Design and Technology
- Awards: FEMINA National Women's Awards

Shilo Shiv Suleman (born 1989) is an Indian contemporary artist. Her work encompasses illustration and installation art. Shilo's practice focuses on the intersection of magical realism, art for social change and technology. In most recent years, she's been engaging with biofeedback technology and the interaction between the body and art. She has created large-scale installations that beat with your heart, apps that react to your brainwaves and sculptures that glow with your breath. She has also designed installations for some of the world's biggest festivals and conferences including Burning Man. She is the founder and director of the Fearless Collective that has over 400 artists who use art to voice their protest against gender violence.

== Personal life ==
Suleman was born and brought up in Bengaluru, Karnataka, India, where she now lives. She trained in animation at the Srishti School of Art, Design and Technology from where she graduated in 2011 as class valedictorian. Her mother, Nilofer Suleman, is a noted Indian contemporary painter. She got attracted to travelling when, as an 11-year-old, she saw her mother recreating maps from the Columbus era.

Suleman has stated that she grew up being influenced by Billie Holiday and Nina Simone. She also credits Harlem and the Blues with influencing her although, now, most of her influences are people "closer to her soil" such as Begum Akhtar.

== Work ==
Inspired by her mother, Nilofer Suleman, Shilo began to draw and write as a young child. She gained early recognition as a blogger and illustrator when she was a teenager. Her first illustrated children's book was published when she was 16, and has since illustrated several more. Shilo's early art was a much darker version of her currently vibrant work. She was awarded The New Indian Express Devi awards in 2015 for her work.

=== Khoya ===
For her diploma project, she designed a storybook app for the iPad called Khoya, with Avijit Michael. She was invited by Ted Global to give a talk, titled "Using Tech to Enable Dreaming" which got over a million views in 2012. She was then chosen as one of the three pioneering Indian women at TEDGlobal, and spoke at conferences like WIRED, DLD in London and Munich. Suleman was awarded the Future Books Innovation award for her illustrative work in Khoya in London.

=== Fearless Collective ===
More recently, she founded The Fearless Collective, a collective of over 400 artists in India using community art to protest gender violence for which she was featured in a host of documentaries including Rebel Music by MTV. She was also felicitated with the Femina "Woman of Worth award" for her work with art and gender violence and the Futurebooks Digital Innovation award in London.

=== Pulse and Bloom ===
In 2014, she collaborated with a neuroscientist Rohan Dixit on creating art that interacts with one's brainwaves and other biofeedback sensors. This made her a recipient of several grants and residencies, including an honorarium grant from Burning Man for the interactive project: Pulse and Bloom. The biofeedback installation brought together artists, architects, entrepreneurs, builders and neurotechnologists. The project was then featured on a host of international media: BBC, Rolling Stone, MSNBC, Tech Crunch, The Guardian, WIRED and more.

=== Studio B ===
In 2018, Shilo Shiv Suleman along with Bollywood actor Arjun Kapoor, fashion designer Kunal Rawal and chef Prateek Sadhu inaugurated Studio B as a part of Belvedere's initiative to connect with other artists to increase their reach.

=== #FearlesslyFRIDA ===
This collaboration was between Fearless Collective and FRIDA (The Young Feminist Fund) to celebrate young feminist organizers worldwide who are pushing boundaries and breaking stereotypes. They began the global art tour with Transvoice which is a young feminist group based on West Jave who aims to empower trans women in the community by raising awareness about trans rights.
