= SlutWalk =

Feminist protest

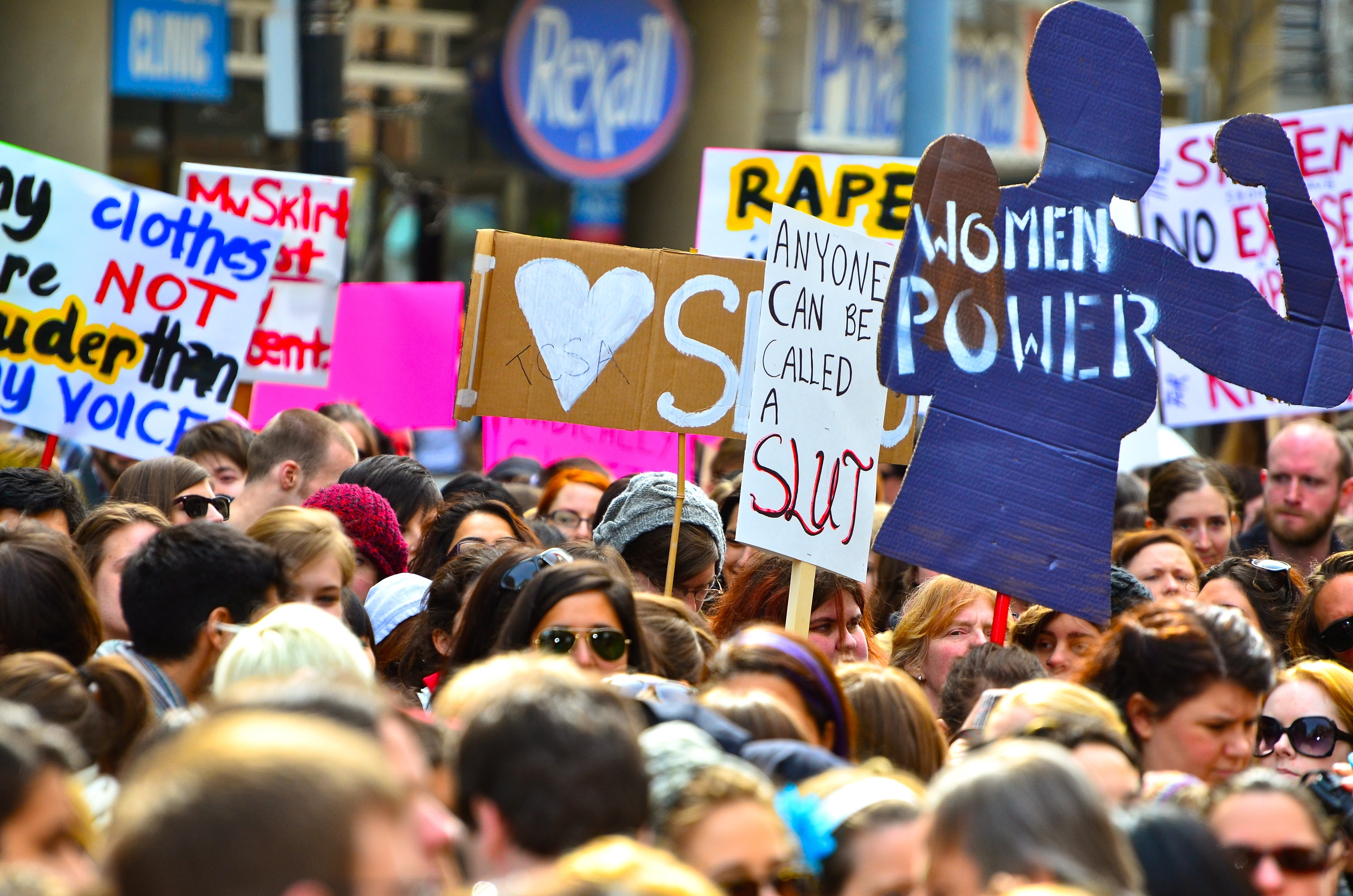
The first SlutWalk in Toronto, Ontario, April 3, 2011

SlutWalk is a transnational movement calling for an end to rape culture, including victim blaming and slut-shaming of sexual assault victims. Participants protest against explaining or excusing rape by referring to any aspect of a woman's appearance. The rallies began on April 3, 2011, in Toronto, Ontario, Canada, after a Toronto Police officer suggested that "women should avoid dressing like sluts in order to not be victimized" as a precaution against sexual assault. Subsequent independent rallies have occurred globally. Rallies continued through most of the 2010s before ceasing.

The protest took the form of a march, mainly by young women, where some dress in clothes considered to be "slutty." In the various SlutWalk Toronto-inspired events around the world, there are usually speaker meetings and workshops, live music, sign-making sessions, leafleting, open microphones, chanting, dances, martial arts, and receptions or after-parties with refreshments. In many of the rallies and online, women speak publicly for the first time about their identity as rape survivors.

== Inception ==
=== Constable Michael Sanguinetti ===
On January 24, 2011, Toronto Police Constable Michael Sanguinetti and another officer from 31 Division spoke on crime prevention, addressing the issue of campus rape at a York University safety forum at Osgoode Hall Law School. During the talk, Sanguinetti interrupted the more senior officer and said: "I've been told I'm not supposed to say this – however, women should avoid dressing like sluts in order not to be victimized."

After an article that reported on the situation received international attention, Sanguinetti apologized for the remark saying:

I made a comment which was poorly thought out and did not reflect the commitment of the Toronto Police Service to the victims of sexual assaults. Violent crimes such as sexual assaults can have a traumatizing effect on their victims... My comment was hurtful in this respect. I am embarrassed by the comment I made and it shall not be repeated.

The apology was attached to an email distributed to the Osgoode community by law school dean Lorne Sossin who said they've been told the officer "is being disciplined and will be provided with further professional training." Co-founders Sonya Barnett and Heather Jarvis decided to redefine the word slut as someone who is in control of their own sexuality, to reclaim the word slut as a site of power for women. They observe that historically, slut has had negative connotations, and that their goal is to reclaim the term. Their website states:

We are tired of being oppressed by slut-shaming; of being judged by our sexuality and feeling unsafe as a result. Being in charge of our sexual lives should not mean that we are opening ourselves to an expectation of violence, regardless if we participate in sex for pleasure or work. No one should equate enjoying sex with attracting sexual assault.

Barnett insisted the apology was not enough, since the officer's stereotypical idea still exists in society.

The comment that was made by Officer Sanguinetti comes from a place where sexual profiling and victim blaming is inherent and a large trait and we'd like that changed," Barnett said, "It isn't about just one idea or one police officer who practices victim blaming, it's about changing the system and doing something constructive with anger and frustration.

Toronto Police spokeswoman Meaghan Gray said cautioning women on their state of dress is not part of any police training. "In fact, this is completely contradictory to what officers are taught," she said. "They are taught that nothing a woman does contributes to a sexual assault." Toronto Police Chief Bill Blair also spoke on the matter: "If that type of, frankly, archaic thinking still exists among any of my officers, it highlights for me the need to continue to train my officers and sensitize them to the reality of victimization." Sanguinetti's statement, according to Blair, is meant to "place the blame upon victims, and that's not where the blame should ever be placed."

Rosemary Gartner, a University of Toronto criminologist, said linking style of dress to sexual assault is "ridiculous." "If that were the case, there would be no rapes of women who wear veils and we know there are rapes in those countries," she said. Darshika Selvasivam, vice-president of the York Federation of Students, said she found the use of the word "extremely alarming." Linking provocative clothing to sexual assault "is a huge myth" and all it does is "blame the survivor of a sexual assault while taking the onus away from the perpetrator," she said. A university spokesperson also said the school was "surprised and shocked" by the comment, although it does have a good and collaborative relationship with police.

To be sure, such a comment from law enforcement is highly offensive in suggesting that some victims of rape are responsible for the criminal acts of their attackers. Rather than admonishing women to dress a certain way, police should be warning potential offenders that they should 'avoid assaulting women in order not to go to prison' —Gail Dines and Wendy J Murphy

=== Justice Robert Dewar ===
SlutWalk organizer Sonya Barnett named the case of Justice Robert Dewar as one of the main reasons to create the movement, and it became also the main cause of Slutwalk Winnipeg.

On February 18, 2011 Justice Robert Dewar convicted Thompson resident Kenneth Rhodes, who worked for the city council, of sexual assault and sentenced him to two years house arrest. Dewar described Rhodes as a "clumsy Don Juan" who had the mistaken belief "sex was in the air" and a "heightened expectation" sex would occur. Dewar said the victim and a friend were dressed in tube tops and high heels when they met Rhodes and another man outside a bar "and made it publicly known that they wanted to party." The court in Winnipeg, Manitoba, heard that the victim had willingly gone off with Rhodes and kissed him. But after she rebuffed his further advances three times, he raped her by the side of the road once they were alone. Rhodes admitted telling the woman 'it would only hurt for a little while' during the assault.

He pleaded not guilty at his trial saying he thought the woman had consented to sex. Dewar rejected his defence but said aspects of it could be considered in sentencing. Prosecutors had asked for a three-year sentence, but Dewar gave Rhodes a conditional or suspended sentence, and ordered him to write a letter of apology to his victim. Politicians of all stripes joined student and feminist groups and those who work with sexual assault victims in decrying the comments.

University of Winnipeg politics professor Shannon Sampert said this is the collateral damage that occurs when you have poorly trained judges in the system. "The victim in this case gets to relive her experiences once again in a new trial, hoping that this judge won't require gender sensitivity training," said Sampert. She said surveys repeatedly show one of the primary reasons women do not report being raped is because of a fear of being victimized again by the justice system.

On February 25, nearly 100 people gathered to call for Justice Robert Dewar's resignation. "These statements by Dewar are reinforcing the myth of implied consent and the myth that a victim of sexual assault is ultimately responsible for their own victimisation," said Alanna Makinson of the Canadian Federation of Students, during the protest. Although this was not a part of Slutwalk, the launch of Slutwalk Toronto on April 3 gave the case national diffusion within Canada. On October 16, Slutwalk Winnipeg took place to reiterate the protest against the judge.

On November 9, Justice Dewar formally apologized. According to the judicial council, Dewar said he wished to "express my unequivocal apology to the (victim) for the hurt she must have experienced from my comments. Some of the letters of complaint, from persons who have worked directly with past victims, have pointed out that some of my comments were also traumatic for them. I very much regret that as well." Alberta Chief Justice Neil Wittmann, who reviewed the complaints against Dewar, said Dewar's comments "showed a clear lack of sensitivity towards victims of sexual assault" but do not merit his removal from the bench. According to the judicial council, Dewar has met with a "gender equality" expert and is "pursuing further professional development in this area as part of his commitment to become a better judge."

The Manitoba Court of Appeal later overturned Rhodes' conviction and ordered a new trial be set. The appeal court ruled Dewar did not properly assess the credibility of the accused and the alleged victim in reaching his verdict. Rhodes was sentenced to three years in prison in 2013.

== First march and consequent growth ==
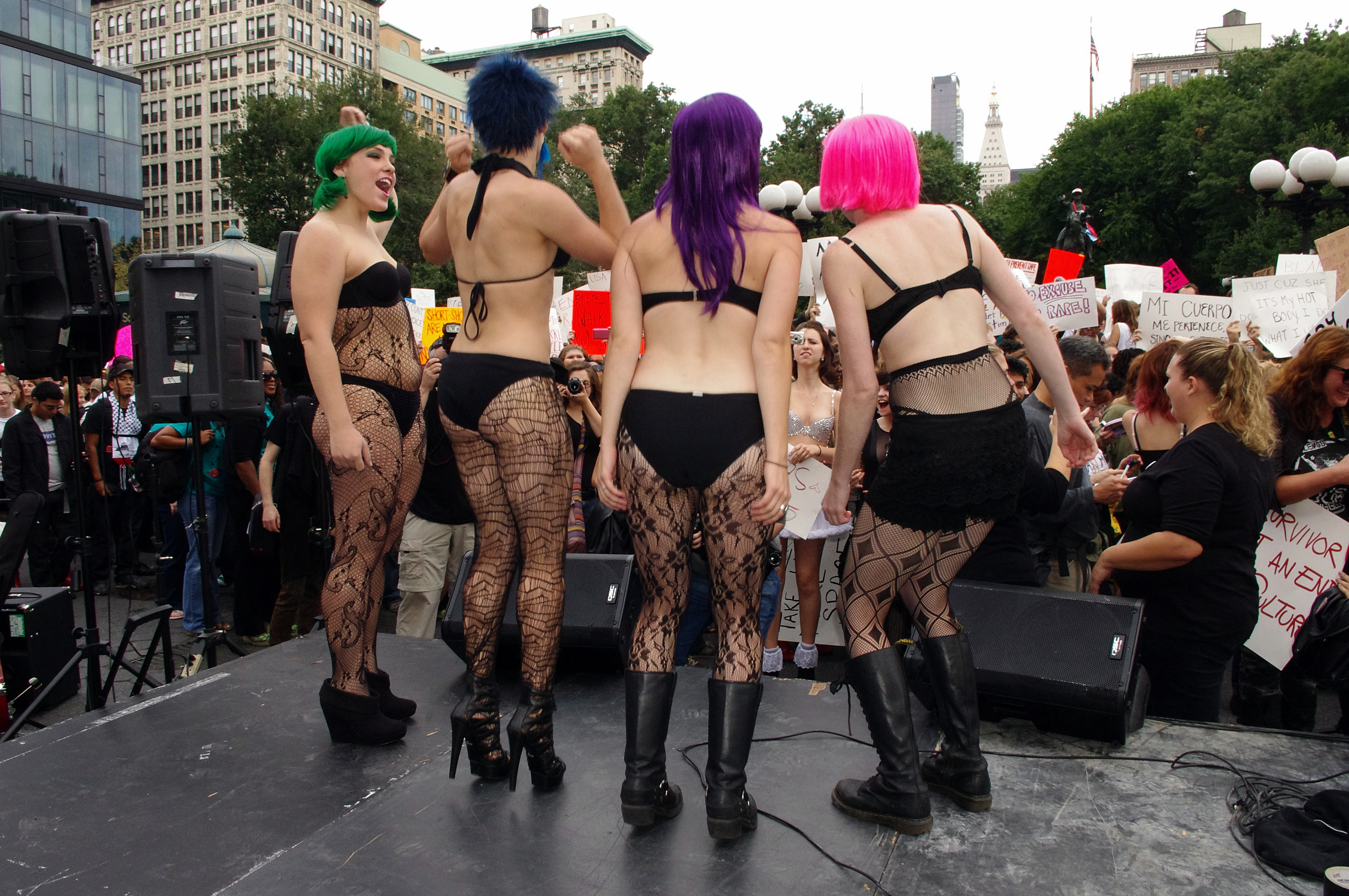
New York City SlutWalkers. Union Square, October 2011

The first Slutwalk was organized in Toronto, Ontario, on April 3, 2011. Although the organizers expected around 200 people to show up, over 3,000 gathered at Queen's Park including Sierra "Chevy" Harris and Magdalena "Maggie" Ivasecko. "We want Police Services to truly get behind the idea that victim-blaming, slut-shaming, and sexual profiling are never acceptable.[...] The idea that a slut is a lesser person and deserving of sexual assault isn't exclusive to the police. Media also has to get behind this idea." Sonya Barnett explained.

The day began with speeches before moving to the Toronto Police Headquarters. The invitation in SlutWalk Toronto website also warned: "Whether a fellow slut or simply an ally, you don't have to wear your sexual proclivities on your sleeve: we just ask that you come. Singles, couples, parents, sisters, brothers, children, friends." Some women attended the protest wearing jeans and T-shirts, while others turned out in fishnets and stilettos.

On May 25, 2012, a new SlutWalk event was organized in Toronto. There were fewer participants than the previous occurrence, although the presence of men was more noticeable. Outfits ranged from sneakers and tank tops to bikinis to costumes. Some attendees went topless. A delegation from the Abbey of the Divine Wood, a Toronto mission of the Sisters of Perpetual Indulgence, manifested in their nuns habits and carried signs including one which read: "Sisters Are Sluts 2".

At Queen's Park, several speakers took the stage—a multi purpose truck—and delivered speeches, some of them spontaneous testimonies. A few paid tribute to the memory of Toronto sex workers' rights activist Wendy Babcock, who took part in the first SlutWalk and died on August 9, 2011, at the age of 32. There were also multiple shows of support for Cece McDonald, a Minneapolis transgender woman facing a 41-month prison sentence for stabbing and killing a man after being harassed and slashed across the face.

On April 4, 2011, a Slutwalk in Sackville, New Brunswick was organized through the Sociology Student Association of Mount Allison University, and was coordinated to follow exactly a day after Toronto's SlutWalk. According to Rebecca Cheff, one of the organizer of the SlutWalk, "the goal is to walk towards the police station and speak to [the police officers] about victim blaming and to raise awareness as they're the frontline worker in sexual assault scenarios." "There is a big misconception that people that dress a certain way ask for sexual assault, and that needs to stop now," said SlutWalk student organizer, Lauren Hutchison. The phrase "still not asking for it" has become a rally cry behind many of these protests and has also been posterized on the bodies of men and women at these walks worldwide.

Dr. Vanessa Oliver, a professor of Sociology and faculty organizer of the SlutWalk, stated, "We have had enough of this slut shaming idea [...] owning our sexual selves should not mean that we are opening ourselves to an expectation of violence," she said. "No one should equate enjoying sex with attracting sexual assault." The protest contained a visible male presence. Two protesters dressed in morphsuits participating in the protest said, "As men we can also create awareness".

According to SlutWalk London, the rallies aim to end a culture of fear and victimisation:

All over the world, women are constantly made to feel like victims, told they should not look a certain way, should not go out at night, should not go into certain areas, should not get drunk, should not wear high heels or make-up, should not be alone with someone they don't know. Not only does this divert attention away from the real cause of the crime – the perpetrator – but it creates a culture where rape is OK, where it's allowed to happen.

Jessica Valenti said: "In just a few months, SlutWalks have become the most successful feminist action of the past 20 years. In a feminist movement that is often fighting simply to hold ground, SlutWalks stand out as a reminder of feminism's more grass-roots past and point to what the future could look like."

It has been compared to the 1970s movement Take Back the Night (also known as Reclaim the Night), which promoted marches to raise awareness and protest against violence against women; although some tension between the two movements has been noted. As with SlutWalk, it asserted women's right to be on the street at night without it being considered an invitation to rape.

To a lesser extent, it has been compared to activist groups like FEMEN, the Ukrainian women's group, and Boobquake, an atheistic and feminist response to Iran's Hojatoleslam Kazem Seddiqi who blamed women who dress immodestly for causing earthquakes. Both integrate nudity and protest.

The most recent protests world-wide took place towards the end of the decade, with marches in cities including Newcastle (2018), Tel Aviv (2018) and München (2019).

== United States ==
=== Amber Rose SlutWalk Festival ===
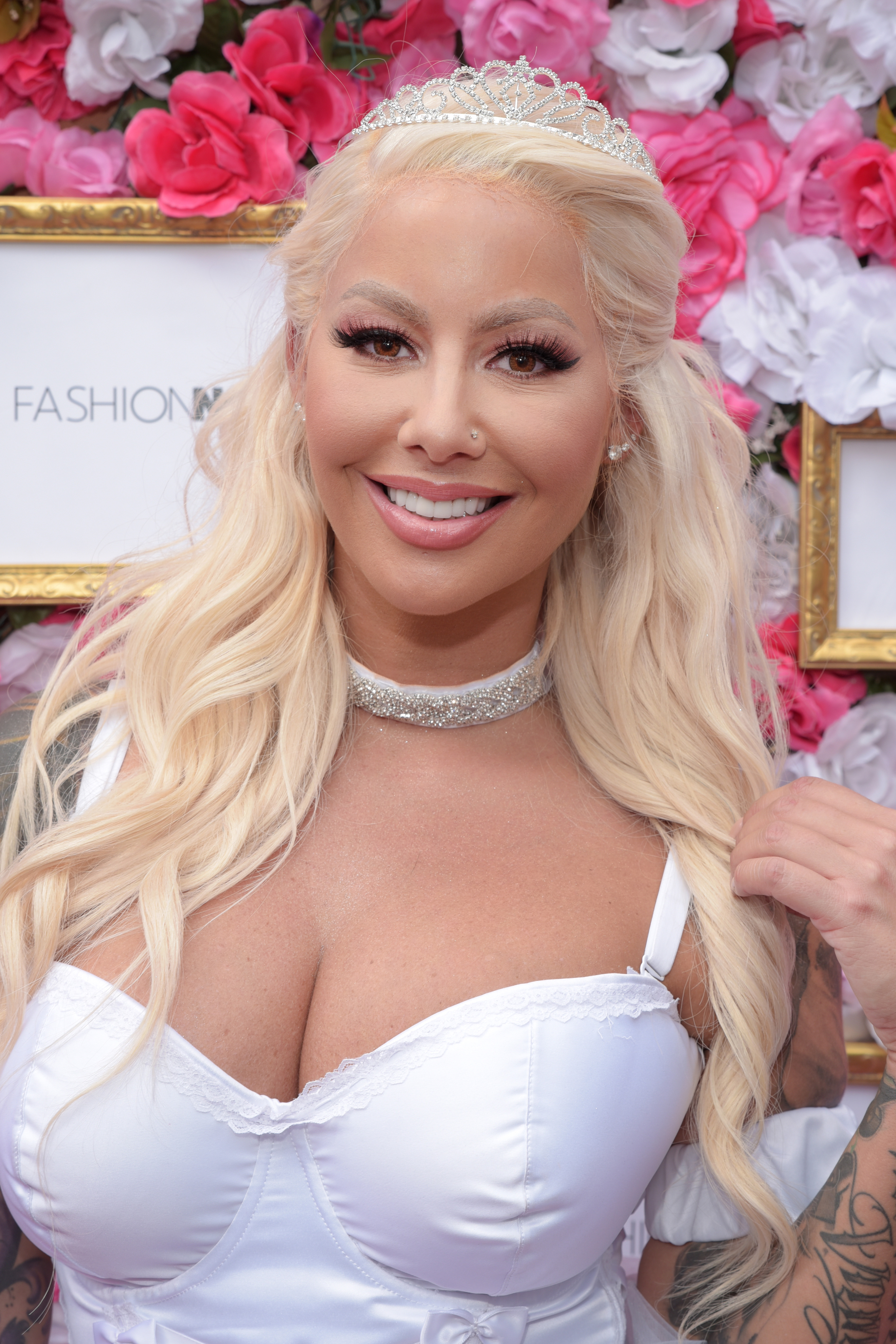
Amber Rose

Amber Rose is an American famous for her outspokenness concerning feminism and her relationships with other celebrities, such as Kanye West. She notes on her website that she did not start the SlutWalk, though "she is bringing more awareness to this matter by educating the public." The Amber Rose SlutWalk Festival is held in Pershing Square in Los Angeles. It holds many activities, including: "live DJs, sign making, educational booths, photo fun, free breast cancer exams, and HIV testing". It is open to volunteers; staff and attendees of the SlutWalk must be at least 18 years of age. The 2016 Amber Rose SlutWalk had sponsors including Subway, T-Mobile, and beats by dre; celebrity attendees included Matt McGorry, Nicki Minaj, and Blac Chyna.

=== SlutWalk NYC ===
A SlutWalk was held in New York City in 2011 that shut down Union Square.

=== Other ===
In 2017 the chairpersons of Chicago SlutWalk wrote, "We still stand behind Dyke March Chicago's decision to remove the Zionist contingent from their event, & we won't allow Zionist displays at ours", referring to a then-upcoming demonstration of the Chicago SlutWalk. The Chicago SlutWalk declared of the Star of David, "its connections to the oppression enacted by Israel is too strong for it to be neutral & IN CONTEXT [at the Dyke March Chicago event] it was used as a Zionist symbol."

In 2017 Slutwalk Detroit was held in Palmer Park by Metro-Detroit Political Action Network (MDPAN). The event was also named "The March for Consent" the event was held in Detroit's "Gayboorhood" due to the high violence rate against transgender women in the area. Key speakers included Transgender Chair for MDPAN Brianna Kingsley and Jennifer Kurland who ran for Michigan Governor 2018 as the Green Party candidate.

== Australia ==
The first SlutWalk in Melbourne took place on May 28, 2011. An estimated 2500 people rallied in front of the Victorian State Library and marched through Melbourne defending how women, men, and children should dress without fear of being sexually assaulted. Protesters held signs that said, "Stop Policing Our Wardrobe and Start Policing Our Streets, Stop Victim Blaming, No Victim is To Blame, I Love Sluts, Sluts Pay Taxes and Stop Whorephobia", to name a few. Supporters of the SlutWalk dressed in drag, casual and sports attire, as well as other types of clothing celebrating who they are. The organizers advised to wear whatever they chose to convey one message: Who's a slut? We all are. Or none of us are. And who cares? It's a stupid, meaningless concept anyway.

SlutWalk Melbourne was organized by Karen Pickering, Lauren Clair, Clementine Bastow, and Natasha Smith. Pickering hosts Cherchez La Femme, talk show of current affairs and pop culture with a feminist flair. Natasha Smith specializes in queer rights and mental health organizations. Clair is a retail sex toy and sexual health consultant. She has run fundraisers in Melbourne for women services. Bastow is a feminist author, music critic, and radio host. Before SlutWalk Melbourne, Clair had second thoughts on redefining the word slut. In an interview with Fairfax newspapers she said, "I've spent my entire life being judged for my appearance and sexuality. I'm sexual, I have sex, I enjoy sex. I'm not going to be ashamed." Clair stated the most memorable chant recited by all genders during the protest was, "However we dress, wherever we go, yes means yes and no means no." The event included five empowering speeches from five speakers: Dr Leslie Cannold, Monica Dux, Ursula Benstead, Elena Jeffreys and Cody Smith.

Feminist writer Dr Cannold started her speech with the greeting, "Hey you sluts". Throughout her speech, Dr. Cannold described the origin and meaning of the word slut stemming from the Middle Ages and its effect in the twenty-first century. "The word slut actually dates back to the middle ages. Those who throw it at us are trying to take us back to the Middle Ages. A time where women were what men said they could be. A slut is used by some boys and some men and even some ecologist women to put women down. When those who use the word slut, what they mean is the same." Cody Smith shared his rape encounter with a transgender man and the effect it had on him. "My rape was not my fault!" he choked back tears as he described his guilt. "I spent so many years blaming myself for my state of intoxication . . . for what I was wearing . . . for not being strong enough to keep the rapist off me." Because of the positive outcome of SlutWalk Melbourne 2011, four SlutWalks in Melbourne have been taken place: SlutWalk Melbourne 2012, Slutfest 2013, SlutWalk Melbourne 2014, SlutTea 2015, and Slutfest 2016.

== Europe ==
Slutwalk in Munich 2019

=== Iceland ===
The first Reykjavík SlutWalk took place on July 23, 2011, only a few months after the very first SlutWalk, which took place in Toronto, Canada, April 3. Since then, the Reykjavík SlutWalk has been held annually on the last Saturday in July, as well as SlutWalks around the country in towns such as Borgarfjörður eystri, Akureyri, Ísafjörður and Sauðárkrókur.

=== Switzerland ===
The Swiss movement was created in August 2012, by women from Geneva and Lausanne. Since then, the collective organised four marches and other events. Swiss SlutWalk, 6 October 2012, 12 October 2013, 13 September 2014, 6 June 2015. The Swiss Slutwalk is an association by law since May 2014.

=== United Kingdom ===
Researchers Jessica Ringrose and Emma Renold interviewed members of a self-organized 'girl power' group in a school in Cardiff, Wales. The aims of the group of Year 8 (age 12-13) and above students had evolved to the delivery of personal social health and economic education (PHSE) lessons to younger students in the school. When asked about the 'SlutWalk', planned for Cardiff in a few weeks time, it led to "an uncomfortable silence, uneasy smiles and raised eyebrows from the two women teachers leading the group." Ringrose and Renold concluded that there was a paradox between teachers that "were incredibly supportive of the general message of the SlutWalk," but who "were simultaneously faced with the ongoing struggle of confronting the sexual regulation experienced by girls in a sanitised school space where 'slut' is a banished and punishable sexual swearword." The teachers went on to say that the girls, "probably can't go, we'll go on the march for them". On the day of the march (4 June 2011), however, a number of the girls did turn up with their mothers and met up with their teachers. Similar marches were also held around this time in a number of UK cities including London, Edinburgh, Newcastle upon Tyne, Bristol and Oxford.

As of 2018, SlutWalk Newcastle is the longest running UK satellite event. The first march was held on 4 June 2011, attended by approximately 200 people. After a five-year hiatus the next Newcastle SlutWalk took place on 28 July 2018.

== Latin America ==
Slutwalks in Latin America were renamed "Marcha das Vadias" in Brazil and "La Marcha de las Putas" in most Spanish-speaking countries, sometimes using PUTAS as an acronym for "Por una transformación Auténtica y Social (For an Authentic Social Transformation)" Countries like Argentina, Brazil, and Colombia were known to host simultaneous Slutwalks in different cities. In all countries, Slutwalks were repeated annually at least once, although not always in the same cities. Some protests selected their dates to match significant events such as the International Day for the Elimination of Violence against Women and the World Youth Day.

There were interactions noted between the organizers in different countries. Organizers from Argentina had previously contacted their counterparts in Mexico and Venezuela through social networks, and artist Adriana Minolitti participated in Mexican Slutwalks before becoming an organizer herself at Buenos Aires. They were, in turn, contacted by organizers in Bolivia and Uruguay to get assistance. Also, the organizer of the national Slutwalk at Colombia had some previous interaction with organizers in Peru, and Argentine activist Leonor Silvestri travelled to Chile to help organize La Marcha de las Maracas in Santiago. There was also an active participation of the LGBT community, and there was a common presence of sex workers, or expressions of solidarity with them. There was also a common regional chant: "¡Alerta, alerta, alerta que camina la Marcha de las Putas por América Latina!" (Alert! Alert! Alert, the sluts are walking down Latin America!).

All protests shared the rejection of Sanguinetti's sayings, and some of them were also directed to local state authorities and Catholic church representatives whose public comments reinforced gender stereotypes and violence against women. Costumes representing Catholic characters were also found across different countries, and many protests demanded a secular State and pointed at the Catholic church as the reason for women's rights to be held back. There were some exceptions like Colombia, in which Catholics marched among people of all other religions, under the banner of La Marcha de las Putas, and the Marcha das Vadias against the public spending for the visit of Pope Francis in Copacabana, Brazil, featured dissident Catholic groups marching among the protesters.

Some protests evolved into permanent organizations, which kept working throughout the whole year to fight violence against women, and participated or organized events other than the typical Slutwalks to raise awareness on sexual assault.

Slutwalks in Latin America

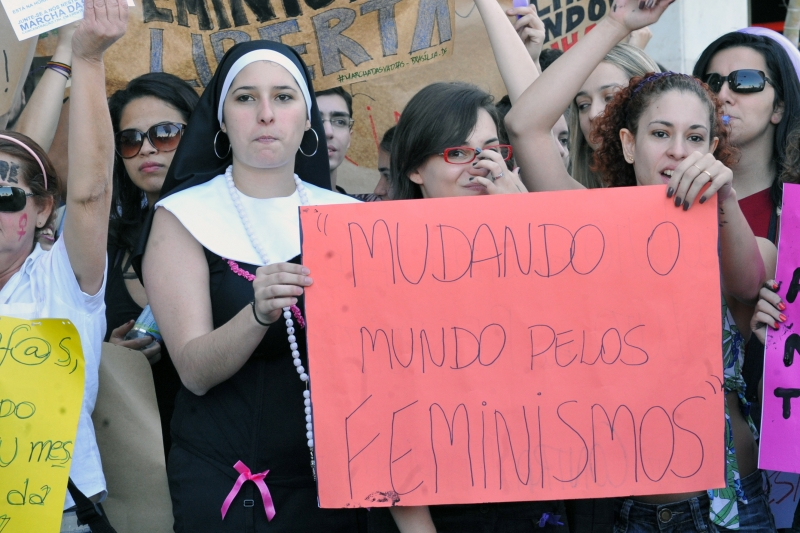
Marcha das Vadias in Brasília, on June 18, 2011. The sign reads: "Changing the world through Feminisms"

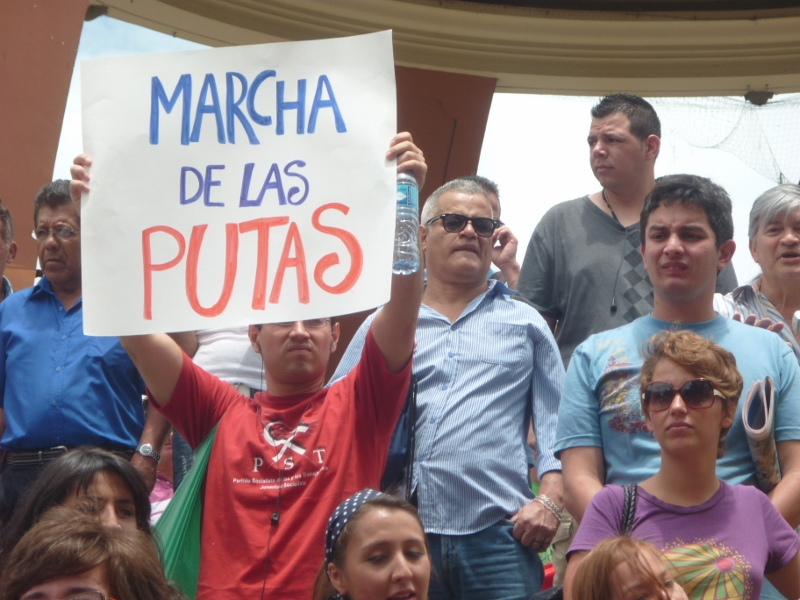
Marcha de las Putas in Costa Rica, August 14, 2011

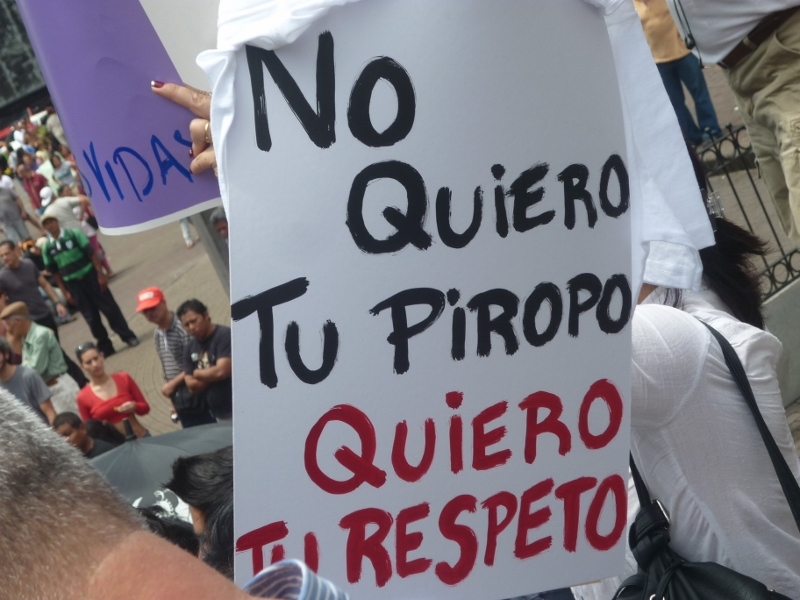
Sign from La Marcha de las Putas saying: "I don't want your catcalling, I want your respect"

== Asia ==
=== South Korea ===
The first Slutwalk campaign in Asia was held on July 16, 2011, in Seoul, Korea, under the name Japnyeonhaengjin (잡년행진). It was planned to be held on the 9th of July, but due to another important event, Slutwalk Korea postponed the event until the next week. The date of the event is same in India, but because of the time difference, the first slutwalk in Asia was held in Seoul. The second slutwalk in South Korea was held on July 28, 2012 in Tapgol Park.

=== India ===
On July 16, 2011, about 50 people rallied for India's first Slutwalk in Bhopal, called Slutwalk arthaat Besharmi Morcha. Rita Banerji, Indian feminist and author reports that SlutWalk was criticised as irrelevant in the face of female feticide, infanticide, dowry murders and honor killings. She argues: "The issue at the crux of the SlutWalk is one and the same as for all the other above mentioned afflictions. It is about the recognition of women as individuals with certain fundamental rights, including that of safety and personal choices, which no one, not even the family, can violate."

On July 31, 2011, Besharmi Morcha took place at New Delhi. The estimated number of protesters was around 500. To ensure that no untoward incident took place, police personnel were deployed all around the area. "No one can ever be safe in Delhi. When we leave our homes, even we are not sure whether we will return safely or not," said a police constable on the condition of anonymity. Actress and social activist Nafisa Ali was present. "Basically, we need to work towards the safety of women on streets. It's an issue of mindset. If a boy can go out at two in the morning, so can a girl," she said. Trishala Singh, one of the organisers, said in reference to the number of participants: "I am not at all disappointed with the walk. A good number of people turned up to support the cause and I am happy with it. I know one walk can't change the mindset of people but it will at least be a beginning."

Another Slutwalk was held in Kolkata on May 24, 2012, gathering around 300 people. As described by the Times of India, young girls walked in all kinds of dresses right from sari and salwar kameez to jeans and skirts. "We want to bring forth the point that one can be sexually harassed even while being clothed from head to toe," stated Film Studies student Sulakshana Biswas, one of the organizers. At the end of the rally, artists from Fourth Bell Theatre group performed short plays and recited poetries on sexual abuse written by famous Urdu poet Saadat Hassan Manto and Bengali writer Mahasweta Devi.

A new Slutwalk took place at Kolkata on June 7, 2013. The walk started at Jadavpur University and continued until Triangular Park. Many participants had 'slut' painted on their bodies in bright colors. Sulakshana, Jadavpur University student and organizer over two consecutive years, said that she intended Slutwalks to be an annual affair in the city. Sayan, another of the organizers said, "We are under no political banner. This is a gender inclusion movement, catering to all."

=== Singapore ===
Previous to the first Slutwalk, a public exchange between the organisers and the local authorities took place, regarding the particularly strict laws on streets demonstrations. Organizers stated there was no need for a permission to hold the protest, while the police sustained that the global nature of the movement and expected presence of foreigners made it necessary. Finally, on November 30, a permit was approved for the Slutwalk to take place at a free-speech park called Speakers' Corner. Social critic and gay rights activist Alex Au commented on the issue: "maybe our senior civil servants can't get past the word 'slut' and have begun to hyperventilate". The Slutwalk finally took place on December 3, 2011. Others wore T-shirts protesting against blaming rape victims on the grounds of their outfits or because they had been drunk or flirting. A new Slutwalk was held in Singapore on December 15, 2012.

== Responses ==
SlutWalk has been subject to racial disputes and accusations that black women and other minority groups are underserved by the movement.

The debate about using the word slut has emerged within the SlutWalk movement itself. Organisers of SlutWalk New York City have withdrawn from the movement because of the name. In Vancouver, the organisers decided to cancel the march and have a discussion instead, to determine a different name. Of the four names suggested (Slutwalk, End the Shame, Yes Means Yes and Shame Stop), SlutWalk remained the favourite, though half the voters had voted against the old name. SlutWalk Philadelphia renamed the protest "A March to End Rape Culture" in order to take into account concerns about inclusivity. Australian activist Melinda Tankard Reist has criticized the name for excluding those who are uncomfortable with "personally owning the word slut." Former British Conservative MP Louise Mensch alleged that SlutWalk 'lionises promiscuity' in a harmful fashion. Indeed, the inclusion of "Sex Party branding" in Australia has been criticised for pressuring rape survivors into sex positivity. Feminist critics of SlutWalk say that it is "the pornification of protest" and evidence that women have internalized their abuse

In 2014, artist Wendy Coburn presented Slut Nation: Anatomy of a Protest, a video documentary of the first Slutwalk, as part of her exhibition Anatomy of a Protest in Toronto. The documentary showed involvement by police provocateurs at the initial protest, and examined the role of props as tools for and against protestors.

== See also ==
- Ele Não movement
- Me Too movement
- Post-assault treatment of sexual assault victims
- Spasime movement
- Slutwalk in Latin America
- Victim blaming
- Women's March
