= Besharmi Morcha =

Indian transnational movement

Besharmi Morcha, also known as "Slutwalk arthaat Besharmi Morcha", is the Indian equivalent of SlutWalk. This was an organization started in 2011 by Canadian women who protested Toronto's police public statements suggesting that women could avoid rape and sexual assault by the way they dressed. They have conducted events across the world for education about this issue.

The first Besharmi Morcha took place in Bhopal on 17 July 2011, followed by Besharmi Morcha Delhi on 31 July 2011. Besharmi Morcha Lucknow took place on 21 August 2011.

Besharmi Morcha Bangalore, coordinated to coincide with similar events in Singapore, Kuala Lumpur and Hong Kong on 4 December 2011, was cancelled by police after they received objections. A police spokesperson said that groups opposing Besharmi Morcha had "threatened to hold a 'violent protest'". Dhillan Mowli, one of the organisers, reported that she had been told that the event was "not part of Indian culture". Mowli also said, "The vice-president of a women's organisation called me and said that if any women were seen in skimpy clothing during the Slutwalk, they would be beaten with brooms."

Christie Thompson, writing for Ms Magazine, observed "...women aren’t marching for the right to walk down the street dressed in barely-there clothes, as critics suggest. They’re fighting for the right to walk down the street. Period."

== Translation ==
Besharmi Morcha (Hindi: बेशर्मी मोर्चा) is most often translated into English as "shameless protest" or "shameless front". It has also been translated as "March of the Shameless" and "Shameless Campaign". Besharmi Morcha was chosen as the name in India to address its diverse cultural aspects and languages.

The word "slut" does not translate directly or equivalently into Indian languages such as Hindi. The nearest equivalent direct translation of slut is ranɖii (Hindi: रंडी) meaning "prostitute". Organizers worried that observers would believe that protesters were identifying as prostitutes, or seeking the right to be prostitutes, rather than protesting to protect women's safety and achieve freedom from sexual violence.

Besharmi (Hindi: बेशर्मी) translates as shamelessly, brazenly and even boldly. It may imply a quality of obscenity or obscenely.

Morcha (Hindi: मोर्चा) is closely linked to the idea of protest and action. It often indicates political protest and has military overtones.

Besharmi Morcha has multiple meanings that are not readily translated into English. It is generally summed up as meaning "shamelessly and boldly protesting in a united way that others may see as wrong or even obscene".
