= John Henry Ingram =

19th/20th-century English biographer

John Henry Ingram (November 16, 1842 – February 12, 1916) was an English biographer and editor with a special interest in Edgar Allan Poe.

Ingram was born at 29 City Road, Finsbury Square, Middlesex, and died at Brighton, England. His family lived at Stoke Newington, recollections of which appear in Poe's works.

J. H. Ingram dedicated himself to the resurrection of Poe's reputation, maligned by the dubious memoirs of Rufus Wilmot Griswold; he published the first reliable biography of the author and a four volume collection of his works. Sarah Helen Whitman's correspondence with Ingram, with her letters from Poe and a daguerreotype portrait, was added to the library of material he was assembling; Ingram's Poe collection is now held at the Albert and Shirley Small Special Collections Library at the University of Virginia.

Ingram was the series editor of the Eminent Women Series (1883–1886) published by W. H. Allen and Company, London.

== Works ==
- Flora Symbolica; or, the Language and Sentiment of Flowers, London: Frederick Warne and Co. New York: Scribner, Welford and Co., 1869.
- Elizabeth Barrett Browning, London: W. H. Allen & Co., 1888 (Eminent Women Series).
- Christopher Marlowe and His Associates, London: Grant Richards, 1904.
- The Haunted Homes and Family Traditions of Great Britain, London : Reeves & Turner, 1912.
