= List of plants with symbolism =

Various folk cultures and traditions assign symbolic meanings to plants. Although these are no longer commonly understood by populations that are increasingly divorced from their rural traditions, some meanings survive. In addition, these meanings are alluded to in older pictures, songs and writings. New symbols have also arisen: one of the most known in the United Kingdom is the red poppy as a symbol of remembrance of the fallen in war.

== List ==
=== A ===
Plant		Culture	Meaning
Abatina		Floriography	Fickleness
Acacia	general	Ancient China	The gods of the North
Acacia	general	Ancient Egypt	Protection, the god Osiris
Acacia	general	Floriography	Friendship; chaste love;
Acacia	pink	Floriography	Elegance
Acacia	yellow	Floriography	Secret Love
Acacia	rose or white	Floriography	Elegance; platonic love
Acanthus	General	Floriography	Art, artifice
Acanthus	Bears breeches	Ancient Rome	Rebirth and prosperity
Adder's tongue		Floriography	Deceit
Adonis' flower		Floriography	Painful recollection, sorrowful remembrances
Agrimonia		Floriography	Thankfulness, gratitude
Ailanthus		Floriography	Lofty aspirations
Alder		Ancient Greece	The fire-bringer Phoroneus
Alder		German folklore	Seduction, trickery, enchantment
Allium		Floriography	Patience, good fortune, prosperity, unity
Almond	general	Ancient Greece	The god Attis
Almond	general	Floriography	Prosperity, wisdom, money, promise; springtime, creation
Almond	general	Judaism	Light, the tree of life, divinity, life
Almond	Common	Floriography	Indiscretion and thoughtlessness, stupidity
Almond	Flowering	Floriography	Hope
Almond	Laural	Floriography	Perfidity
Allspice		Floriography	Compassion
Aloe		Floriography	Grief, affliction, religious superstition
Aloysia		Floriography	Forgiveness
Alyssum		Floriography	Worth beyond beauty
Amaranth
Amaranth	general	Floriography	Immortality
Amaranth	Amaranth (Cockscomb)	Floriography	Foppery, affectation
Amaranth	Amaranth (Globe)	Floriography	Immortal love, hard working, unchangeable
Amaranth	Prince's feather	Floriography	Immortality, unfading
Amaryllis		Floriography	Pride, timidity, splendid beauty; hope and achievement.
Ambrosia		Floriography	Love is reciprocated
American Cowslip		Floriography	You are my divinity, divine beauty
American Elm		Floriography	Patriotism
American Linden		Floriography	Matrimony
American Starwort		Floriography	Welcome to a stranger, Cheerfulness in old age
Anemone
Anemone	General	Floriography	Brevity, withered hopes; anticipation
Anemone	Zephyr Flower	Floriography	Sickness; expectation
Anemone	Garden	Floriography	Forsaken
Angelica		Floriography	Inspiration
Angrec		Floriography	Royalty
Anthurium		Floriography	Hospitality, happiness, abundance
Apple	general		Love, healing, immortality, preference
Apple	general	Ancient Greece	Love, marriage
Apple	general	Floriography	Temptation;
Apple	general	Celtic tradition	Truth, peace, beauty; harmony, prosperity, good fortune
Apple	Blossom	Floriography	Preference, better things to come, good fortune; fame speaks him great and good
Apple	Thorn	Floriography	Deceitful charms
Apricot			Love
Apricot		Floriography	Temptation; doubt;
Arborvitae		Floriography	Everlasting friendship, "live for me"; "thine till death"
Arbutus		Floriography	Simplicity; you are the only one I love
Arnica		Floriography	"Let me heal thy grief"
Arum		Floriography	Ardour;
Arum		Ancient Rome	Fertility
Ash		Floriography	Grandeur;
Ash		Ancient Greece/among Irish migrants	Good luck at sea;
Ash		Native American	Calmness, sacrifice, sensibility
Ash		Celtic tradition	Protection from sorcery and fire
Ash-leaved Trumpet Flower		Floriography	Separation
Aspen		Floriography	Excess of sensibility; lamentation
Asphodel		Ancient Greece	The underworld, death, food of the dead
Asphodel		Floriography	Death, the underworld; "my regrets follow you to the grave"; remembered beyond the tomb
Aster		Floriography	Symbol of love, daintiness, talisman of love, trusting; cheerfulness in old age
Astragalus		Floriography	Your presence softens my pain
Auricula
Auricula	General	Floriography	Painting
Auricula	Scarlet	Floriography	Avarice
Azalea		China	Womanhood
Azalea		Floriography	Take care, temperance, fragile, gratitude, passion

=== B ===
Plant		Culture	Meaning
Baby's breath		Floriography	Innocence, purity of heart
Balm		Floriography	Sympathy
Balm of Gilead		Floriography	Cure, relief; sympathetic feeling
Balsam
Balsam	Red	Floriography	Touch me not; ardent love; impatient resolves
Balsam	Yellow	Floriography	Impatience
Bamboo	general	China	Modesty, prosperity, filial piety, integrity, chastity, purity
Bamboo	general	Korea	Good luck, resilience, flexibility, integrity, chastity, purity
Bamboo	general	Japan	Immortality
Bamboo	general	Buddhism	Spirituality
Bamboo	general	Vietnam	Unity, optimism, work ethic
Bamboo	general	Hinduism	The god Krishna
Bamboo	general	Shintoism	Protection
Bamboo	Giant thorny bamboo	India	Shelter, audience, friendship
Banyan		Hinduism	Knowledge, divinity
Baobab			Life, passage to and from the spirit world
Barberry		Floriography	Sourness of temper, petulance
Basil		Floriography	Hate; (archaic) poverty
Bay		Floriography	Glory, (in a wreath) reward of merit; "I change but in death"
Bayberry		Floriography	"I respect thy tears"
Bearded Crepis		Floriography	Protection
Beech			Knowledge;
Beech		Floriography	Prosperity;
Beech		Ancient Rome	Sacred tree of Jove
Beech		Native American	Tolerance, criticism
Begonia		Floriography	Beware; a fanciful nature; deformity
Bellflower		Floriography	Unwavering love, a constant heart gratitude, constancy
Bells of Ireland		Floriography	Good luck
Belvedere		Floriography	I declare against you
Betony		Floriography	Surprise
Bilberry		Floriography	Treachery;
Bilberry		Celtic tradition	Harvest
Bindweed
Bindweed	Great	Floriography	Insinuation
Bindweed	Small	Floriography	Humility
Birch			Protection, purification, exorcism; the goddesses Freya and Frigg, motherhood, bosom
Birch		Floriography	Elegance; Meekness;
Birch		Siberian shamanism	Bridge to the spirit world
Bird's-foot trefoil		Floriography	Revenge
Bird of paradise flower		Floriography	Liberty, magnificence, good perspective, joyfulness; faithfulness
Black-eyed Susan			Justice
Black oak			Strength, durability, wisdom, and endurance
Blackthorn		Floriography	Fate, protection, hope against adversity, good fortune; difficulty
Bladdernut		Floriography	Frivolous amusement; a trifling character
Bladderwort			Inner Strength and Duality
Bleeding Heart, Asian / Lamprocapnos			Rejected love, passionate love, unconditional love, compassion
Bluebell		Floriography	Loyalty, constancy, humility & gratitude
Bog-rosemary		Floriography	Bound by fate; "Will you help me?"
Boxwood		Floriography	Firmness and stoicism, constancy
Borage		Floriography	Bluntness, abruptness
Bouncing bet		Floriography	Intrusion
Bouvardia		Floriography	Enthusiasm
Bramble		Floriography	Lowliness, envy, remorse
Broom		Floriography	Humility and neatness
Browallia		Floriography	"Can you bear poverty?"
Brugmansia			Vivacity, vibrancy, health, danger
Buckbean		Floriography	Calm repose
Bulrush		Floriography	Docility; indiscretion; indecision
Bugloss		Floriography	Falsehood
Burdock		Floriography	Importunity, touch me not
Buttercup		Floriography	Sarcasm, ingratitude; childishness; riches, memories of childhood
Butterfly Weed		Floriography	Let me go

=== C ===
Plant		Culture	Meaning
Cabbage		Floriography	Profit
Cacalia		Floriography	Adulation
Cactus		Floriography	Warmth
Calla Lily		Floriography	Magnificence and beauty; feminine beauty; modesty
Calycanthus / Sweetshrub		Floriography	Benevolence
Camellia
Camellia	General	Floriography	Constancy and steadfastness; richness, excellency
Camellia	Red	Floriography	Unpretending excellence
Camellia	White	Floriography	Perfected loveliness
Canary Grass		Floriography	Perseverance
Candytuft		Floriography	Indifference
Canterbury Bells		Floriography	Gratitude, acknowledgement; constancy
Cape Jasmine		Floriography	I'm too happy
Cardamine		Floriography	Paternal error
Carnation	general	Floriography	Fascination; distinction; ardent love; contempt; woman's love; dreams, passion, remembering
Carnation	red	Floriography	Deep romantic love, passion, admiration
Carnation	deep red	Floriography	"alas poor heart,"
Carnation	green		Secret symbol of the followers of Oscar Wilde, love between two men
Carnation	white	Floriography	Sweet and lovely, innocence, pure love, faithfulness
Carnation	pink	Floriography	A woman's love, a mother's love; I'll never forget you
Carnation	yellow	Floriography	Rejection, disdain, disappointment; pride and beauty
Carnation	purple	Floriography	Capriciousness
Carnation	striped	Floriography	Refusal, no, "sorry I can't be with you"
Carnation	solid color	Floriography	Yes, affirmative
Cardinal flower		Floriography	Distinction
Catchfly	general	Floriography	Pretended love, a snare; "I am thy prisoner"
Catchfly	Sticky Catchfly	Floriography	Invitation to dance
Catchfly	red	Floriography	Youthful love
Catchfly	white	Floriography	Betrayed
Cedar	General		Wisdom
Cedar	General	Floriography	Strength,
Cedar	General	Sumer	The world tree, the god Enki
Cedar	General	Hebrew tradition	Purification
Cedar	Leaf	Floriography	I live for thee
Cedar	Cedar of Lebanon	Floriography	Incorruptible
Cempasúchil		Latin America	Dia de los Muertos
Celandine		Floriography	Joys to come; deceptive hopes
Cereus		Floriography	(creeping) Modest genius, horror
Centaury		Floriography	Delicacy
Chamomile		Floriography	Energy in adversity; mercy
Champignon		Floriography	Suspicion
Chequered Fritillily		Floriography	Persecution
Cherry	Blossom	Floriography	A good education;
Cherry	Blossom	Japan	Transience of life, Mono no aware, Wabi-sabi, gentleness, kindness;
Cherry	Blossom	China	Feminine beauty
Cherry	Blossom, white	Floriography	Deception
Cherry	Tree		Kindness, beauty, love
Cherry	Tree	Native American	expressiveness, rebirth, compassion
Chestnut	general	Floriography	Do me justice; deceptive appearances; luxury
Chestnut	Sweet chestnut		The god Zeus, nourishment
Chestnut	Sweet chestnut	Ancient China	The earth gods of the west
Chestnut	Sweet chestnut	Christianity	goodness, chastity, overcoming temptation
Chicory		Floriography	Frugality
Chicory		Middle ages	Magic, protection, martyrdom
China aster
China aster	General	Floriography	Love of variety, fidelity, afterthought
China aster	Double	Floriography	"I partake your sentiments"
China aster	Single	Floriography	"I will think of thee/it"
Christmas rose		Floriography	Relieve my anxiety
Chrysanthemum	general	Floriography	fidelity, optimism, joy and long life; "you're a wonderful friend," rest, cheerfulness protection, good luck, immortality, daintiness
Chrysanthemum	general	China	Solitude, longevity, wealth, a peaceful retirement
Chrysanthemum	red	Floriography	Love
Chrysanthemum	yellow	Floriography	Slighted love
Chrysanthemum	white	Floriography	Truth, loyal love
Chrysanthemum	Chinese	Floriography	Cheerfulness under adversity
Cinquefoil		Floriography	Beloved daughter/child; maternal affection
Circaea		Floriography	Spell
Cistus or rock rose
Cistus or rock rose	Common	Floriography	Popular favor
Cistus or rock rose	Gum	Floriography	"I shall die to-morrow"
Citron		Floriography	Ill-natured beauty
Clematis
Clematis	General	Floriography	Mental beauty
Clematis	Evergreen	Floriography	Poverty
Clianthus		Floriography	Glorious beauty
Clotbur		Floriography	Rudeness, pertinacity
Clovenlip Toadflax		Floriography	Please notice my love/feelings for you
Clove		Floriography	Dignity
Clover	red	Floriography	Industry
Clover	white	Floriography	Think of me
Clover	Four-leaved	Floriography	Be mine
Cobaea		Floriography	Gossip
Coltsfoot		Floriography	Justice shall be done
Columbine	General		(in Hamlet) Ingratitude, infidelity
Columbine	General	Ancient Greece and Rome	Sexuality, the goddesses Aphrodite and Venus
Columbine	General	Christianity	The Holy Spirit, praise of God, protection
Columbine	General	Celtic tradition	Door to the otherworld
Columbine	General	Floriography	Folly;
Columbine	Purple or violet		Passion, penence
Columbine	Purple or violet	Floriography	Resolved to win
Columbine	Red	Floriography	Anxious and trembling
Columbine	Yellow		Light, vivacity
Convolvulus
Convolvulus	General	Floriography	Bonds
Convolvulus	Major	Floriography	Extinguished hopes
Convolvulus	Pink	Floriography	Worth sustained by affection
Corchorus		Floriography	Impatient of absence
Coreopsis		Floriography	Always cheerful, love at first sight
Coriander		Floriography	Hidden merit
Corn
Corn	General	Floriography	Wealth
Corn	Broken	Floriography	Quarrel
Corn	Straw	Floriography	Agreement
Corncockle		Floriography	Gentility, worth above beauty
Cornel tree		Floriography	Duration
Cornflower / Bachelor's button / Bleuet de France			Tenderness, power, reliability
Cornflower / Bachelor's button / Bleuet de France		Ancient Egypt	Life, fertility
Cornflower / Bachelor's button / Bleuet de France		Floriography	Celibacy; hope; single blessedness; delicacy;
Cornflower / Bachelor's button / Bleuet de France		France and Belgium	Remembrance of fallen soldiers
Coronilla		Floriography	"Success crown your wishes"
Cotton lavender / Santolina		Floriography	Purification
Cowslip		Floriography	Youthful beauty and winning grace, rejected love (in Switzerland), "glory of spring," heartsickness and the death of young maidens; rusticity, healing, pensiveness
Cranberry		Floriography	Cure for heartache; hardiness
Cress		Floriography	Resolution; stability, power
Crocus	General		Rebirth of nature
Crocus	General	Minoan	Transition to adulthood
Crocus	General	Floriography	Love, abuse not, Lupercalia; impatience, youthful joy, hope, and friendship in adversity
Crocus	Spring	Floriography	Cheerfulness
Crocus	Saffron	Floriography	Love of variety, fidelity; mirth; beware of excess
Crown Imperial		Floriography	Power and majesty, especially imperial power; pride of birth
Crowfoot
Crowfoot	General	Floriography	Ingratitude
Crowfoot	Aconite-leaved	Floriography	Lustre
Cudweed (American)		Floriography	Unceasing remembrance
Currant		Floriography	"Thy frown will kill me"; "you please all"
Cuscuta		Floriography	Meanness
Cyclamen		Floriography	Diffidence
Cypress		Floriography	Death, mourning, despair, sorrow

=== D ===
Plant		Culture	Meaning
Daffodil		Floriography	Unrequited love, evanescent happiness and deceitful hopes; regard, respect; self-love; chivalry, new beginnings
Dahlia		Floriography	Elegance and dignity; abundance; instability
Daisy	general	Floriography	Loyal love, gentleness, innocence; womanly truth, purity, fidelity, and patient endurance;
Daisy	Easter	Floriography	Candor and innocence
Daisy	Michaelmas	Floriography	Farewell
Daisy	garden	Floriography	"I share your sentiments"
Daisy	red	Floriography	Beauty unknown to possessor; unconscious
Daisy	parti-coloured pink and white	Floriography	Beauty
Daisy	white	Floriography	Innocence
Daisy	wild	Floriography	"I will think of it"
Dame's violet		Floriography	Watchfulness
Dandelion		Floriography	Overcoming hardship; faithfulness, happiness, love's oracle; rustic oracle; youthful recollections; coquetry
Daphne
Daphne	General	Floriography	Sweets to the sweet
Daphne	Daphne odora	Floriography	Painting the lily
Darnel		Floriography	Vice
Datura		Floriography	Calamity
Daylily		Floriography	Coquetry
Delphinium		Floriography	Flight of fancy
Desert date		Ancient Egypt	Fame, eternal life
Dew plant		Floriography	A Serenade
Dill		Floriography	Passion; lust
Diphylleia			I will show my true self to you, clarity, honesty
Dittany of Crete
Dittany of Crete	General	Floriography	Childbirth
Dittany of Crete	White	Floriography	Passion
Dock		Floriography	Patience
Dodder of thyme		Floriography	Baseness
Dogbane		Floriography	Deceit, falsehood
Dogwood		Floriography	Durability; honesty, true nobility
Dragon plant		Floriography	Snare
Dragonwort		Floriography	Horror

=== E ===
Plant		Culture	Meaning
Ebony tree		Floriography	Blackness
Edelweiss		Floriography	Chivalrous devotion, high courage; daring, noble purity
Elderflower/Elder		Floriography	Compassion; humility; zeal;
Elderflower/Elder		Celtic tradition	Death, rebirth, creativity, regeneration, transformation; fertility
Elderflower/Elder		Ireland and Isle of Man	Associated with faeries and giants
Elm	general		Love
Elm	general	Floriography	Dignity; love
Elm	general	Native American	Wisdom, willpower, intuition
Elm	Wych	Ancient Greece	The underworld
Endive		Floriography	Frugality
Eupatorium		Floriography	Delay
Evening primrose		Floriography	Inconstancy, silent love
Everlasting	general	Floriography	Never-ceasing remembrance
Everlasting	H. orientale	Ancient Greece	Divinity
Everlasting pea		Floriography	Lasting pleasure
Eyebright		Floriography	Joy, mental clarity, psychic powers; "your eyes are bewitching"

=== F ===
Plant		Culture	Meaning
Fennel			Cuckoldry, as in Shakespeare's Hamlet,
Fennel		Florigraphy	Merit, strength, worthy of all praise;
Fern
Fern	General	Florigraphy	Magic, fascination, sincerity; Confidence
Fern	Common bracken	Ancient Rome	The world soul, impirial power and conquest
Fern	Flowering fern	Florigraphy	Reverie
Feverfew		Florigraphy	Beneficence
Fig	general		Divinisation, fertility, love, sexuality; the deities Dionysus and Demeter, good luck
Fig	general	Florigraphy	Argument; longevity, prolificness;
Fig	general	Ancient Hebrew tradition	Peace, abundance
Fig	general	Greek Orthodoxy	Temptation
Fig	general	Islam	The Tree of Knowledge
Fig	Sycamore fig		Nourishment, life
Fig	Sycamore fig	Ancient Egypt	The goddess Hathor, passage to the underworld, eternal life
Fig	Pipal	Buddhism	Enlightenment
Filbert		Florigraphy	Reconciliation
Fir		Ancient Greece	Male virility, a phallic symbol
Fir		Florigraphy	Time, elevation
Flax		Florigraphy	Domestic industry, fate, "I feel your kindness"; (when dried) utility
Flowering reed		Florigraphy	Confidence in Heaven
Flower-of-an-Hour		Florigraphy	Delicate beauty
Fool's Parsley		Florigraphy	Silliness
Forget-me-not		Florigraphy	True love, don't forget me; faithful love, affectionate remembrance, chivalry, light, truth
Foxtail grass		Florigraphy	Sporting
Foxglove		Florigraphy	Insecurity; stateliness, youth; insincerity; delirium
Freesia		Florigraphy	Innocence, trust, friendship
Frog orphys		Florigraphy	Disgust
Fuller's Teasel		Florigraphy	Misanthropy
Fumitory		Florigraphy	Spleen
Fungus		Florigraphy	Resilience, loneliness, solitude, disgust
Fuchsia
Fuchsia	General	Florigraphy	Grace;
Fuchsia	Scarlet	Florigraphy	Taste

=== G ===
Plant		Culture	Meaning
Gardenia		Floriography	Secret love, joy, good luck, peace, spirituality; purity, sweet love, you're lovely
Geranium	General	Floriography	Gentility, determination; (archaic) folly; confidence; deceit, preference
Geranium	Ivy	Floriography	Bridal favor
Geranium	Lemon	Floriography	Unexpected meeting
Geranium	Oak-leaved	Floriography	True friendship
Geranium	Pencilled-leaf	Floriography	Ingenuity
Geranium	Rose-scented	Floriography	Preference
Geranium	Scarlet	Floriography	Stupidity; consolation
Geranium	Silver-leaved	Floriography	Recall
Geranium	Wild	Floriography	Steadfast piety
Gillyflower		Floriography	Bonds of affection
Ginkgo			Longevity, life-force, unity, duality
Ginkgo		Japan	Hope
Gladiolus		Floriography	Strength of character, honor, conviction, generosity; ready armed
Glory flower		Floriography	Glorious beauty
Goat's rue		Floriography	Reason
Goldenrod		Floriography	Encouragement; be cautious; precaution
Gooseberry		Floriography	Anticipation
Gorse/furze		Floriography	Love in all seasons, endearing affection;
Gourd		Floriography	Extent, bulk
Grapevine	general		Fertility, money, mental powers, virility;
Grapevine	general	Ancient Hebrew	Beauty, strength, usefulness;
Grapevine	wild	Floriography	Charity
Grass		Floriography	Submission, utility
Guelder rose (or snowball)		Floriography	Winter, age; thoughts of heaven

=== H ===
Plant		Culture	Meaning
Hand-flower tree		Floriography	Warning
Harebell		Floriography	Submission, grief
Hawkweed		Floriography	Quicksightedness
Hawthorn			Guardianship, protection, spiritual cleansing, fertility, marriage, the goddesses Cardea and Hera
Hawthorn		Floriography	Hope;
Hazel			Good luck, fertility, protection, desires
Hazel		Floriography	Peace, reconciliation;
Hazel		Celtic tradition	Unfulfilled love, symbol of heralds; knowledge
Hazel		Irish folklore	Poetry, magic
Heath		Floriography	Solitude
Heather	purple	Floriography	Solitude, beauty, admiration
Heather	white	Floriography	Protection, wishes will come true
Helenium		Floriography	Tears
Hellebore		Floriography	Scandal; calumny
Heliotrope		Floriography	Emblem of faithfully devoted love
Hemlock		Floriography	You will be my death
Hemp		Floriography	Fate
Henbane		Floriography	Imperfection
Hepatica		Floriography	Confidence
Hibiscus		Floriography	Delicate beauty;
Hibiscus		Hinduism	The goddess Kali
Himalayan blue poppy			Potential, possibilities, psychic skills
Holly		Floriography	Foresight
Holly		Celtic tradition	Masculinity, winter
Holly		Christianity	Christmas
Hollyhock		Floriography	Ambition; fruitfulness
Honey flower		Floriography	Love sweet and secret
Honeysuckle
Honeysuckle	General	Floriography	Devoted and generous affection; bonds of love
Honeysuckle	Coral	Floriography	The colour of my fate
Honeysuckle	French	Floriography	Rustic beauty
Hop		Floriography	Injustice
Hornbeam		Floriography	Ornament; guardianship
Horse chestnut		Floriography	Luxury
Houseleek		Floriography	Domestic economy, vivacity
Houstonia		Floriography	Content
Humble plant		Floriography	Despondency
Hyacinth
Hyacinth	blue	Floriography	Constancy
Hyacinth	purple	Floriography	Grief and sorrow; Please forgive me
Hyacinth	red or pink	Floriography	Playfulness, sport
Hyacinth	white	Floriography	Unobtrusive loveliness
Hyacinth	yellow	Floriography	Jealousy
Hydrangea
Hydrangea	general	Floriography	In a negative sense frigidity, heartlessness; Thank you for understanding; boastfulness "you are cold"
Hydrangea	pink		Heartfelt emotion or gratitude
Hydrangea	purple		A desire to deeply understand someone
Hydrangea	blue		Frigidity and apology
Hydrangea	white		Boasting, bragging, purity, grace and abundance
Hyssop		Floriography	Purification; cleanliness

=== I ===
Plant		Culture	Meaning
Iceland moss		Floriography	Health
Ice plant		Floriography	Formality; "Your looks freeze me", idleness
Indian cress		Floriography	Warlike trophy
Iris	general		Admiration, purification, hope, embalm of French kings, knighthood, chivalry
Iris	general	Floriography	Eloquence, good news, light; faith, valor, wisdom, friendship; a message;
Iris	general	Ancient Egypt	Victory, power
Iris	general	Ancient Greece	Bridge between humans and divinity, safe passage to the afterlife
Iris	general	China	Fondness, grace, solitary beauty
Iris	general	Christianity	The Annunciation, the Virgin Mary's pain; protection from evil
Iris	blue		Belief, hope
Iris	blue	Ancient Japan	Courage
Iris	blue	Turkey	Often planted on graves
Iris	purple		Wisdom;
Iris	yellow	Floriography and others	Passion
Iris	white		Purity
Iris	German	Floriography	Flame
Ipomoea		Floriography	Attachment
Indian Paintbrush			Passion, creativity, and the courage to forge new paths
Ivy			Protection, healing; permanence
Ivy		Floriography	Dependence, endurance; faithfulness, wedded love, affection; friendship; (sprig with tendrils) assiduous to please;
Ivy		Celtic tradition	Femininity, summer

=== J-K ===
Plant		Culture	Meaning
Jacob's Ladder / Greek valerian		Floriography	Rupture; come down
Jasmine
Jasmine	General		Prophetic dreams;
Jasmine	General	Floriography	Unconditional and eternal love; monetary wealth
Jasmine	General	Hinduism and the Philippines	Emblem of brides
Jasmine	Cape	Floriography	Transport of joy
Jasmine	Carolina	Floriography	Separation
Jasmine	Indian	Floriography	Attachment
Jasmine	Spanish	Floriography	Sensuality
Jasmine	white	Floriography	Amiability
Jasmine	yellow	Floriography	Grace and elegance
Jonquil		Floriography	Desire, returned affection, love me
Judas tree		Floriography	Unbelief, betrayal
Juniper		Floriography	Asylum, protection; succour
Justicia		Floriography	"Perfection of female loveliness"
Kauri		Māori culture	Eternal friendship
Kennedia		Floriography	Mental beauty
Kerria (棣棠 Dì táng)		China	Royalty, Nobility of heart
King-cups / marsh marigold		Floriography	Desire of riches

=== L ===
Plant		Culture	Meaning
Laburnum		Floriography	Forsaken, pensive beauty
Lagerstrgemia (Indian)		Floriography	Eloquence
Lantana		Floriography	Rigour
Larch		Floriography	Audacity, boldness
Larkspur	General	Floriography	Levity, lightness; an open heart
Larkspur	pink	Floriography	Fickleness
Larkspur	purple	Floriography	Haughtiness
Laurel	general	Ancient Greece	Victory, the god Apollo, purification
Laurel	general	Floriography	Glory and honor
Laurel	Common, in flower	Floriography	Perfidity
Laurel	Ground	Floriography	Perseverance
Laurel	Mountain	Floriography	Ambition
Laurestine		Floriography	"I die if neglected"; a token
Lavender			LGBT+ identity; sleep, chastity, longevity, happiness, purification, peace
Lavender		Floriography	Love, devotion, loyalty; distrust; confession
Lemon blossom		Floriography	Fidelity in love; discretion, zest
Lettuce	general	Ancient Egypt	Sex, fertility, the god Min
Lettuce	general	Floriography	Cold-heartedness;
Lettuce	Prickly	Ancient Greece	Impotency, the death of love
Lichen		Floriography	Dejection, solitude
Licorice		Floriography	(wild) "I declare against you,"
Lilac	general		Memories, protection
Lilac	field	Floriography	Humility
Lilac	purple	Floriography	First emotions of love
Lilac	white	Floriography	Youthful innocence, humility
Lily	general		Hope, renewal, birth, motherhood, passion, union, promise, mercy, memories, protection, perfection
Lily	general	Ancient Greece	The goddess Hera, the underworld, fertility, virility, masculinity
Lily	general	Ancient Rome	The goddesses Venus and Juno
Lily	general	Floriography	Affection for loved ones, majesty;
Lily	Madonna lily	Christianity	Chastity, purity, the soul of the Virgin Mary, faith, divinity, symbols of Saint Anthony and Archangel Gabriel
Lily	orange	Floriography	Desire, passion; hatred; wealth
Lily	pink		Love, femininity and admiration
Lily	scarlet		Lofty aspirations
Lily	white		Sapphic love
Lily	white	Floriography	Purity, sweetness,
Lily	yellow	China and Japan	Healing
Lily	yellow	Floriography	Falsehood, gaiety;
Lily of the valley			Mental powers
Lily of the valley		Floriography	Sweetness, humility, purity; returning happiness;
Lime/Linden	general		Protection, immortality, good luck, love, sleep
Lime/Linden	general	Christianity	The Holy Ghost's power
Lime/Linden	blossom	Floriography	Conjugal love
Lionsheart		Floriography	Bravery
Liverwort		Floriography	Confidence
Lobelia		Floriography	Malevolence
Locust tree	general	Floriography	Elegance
Locust tree	green	Floriography	Affection beyond the grave
London pride		Floriography	Frivolity
Lophospermum		Floriography	Ecstasy
Lote tree		Floriography	Concord
Lotus	general	China	Harmonious marriage, purity, progeny, the past, present, and future; prosperity, steadfastness
Lotus	general	Floriography	Purity, chastity and eloquence; rebirth; estranged love
Lotus	flower	Floriography	Estranged love
Lotus	leaf	Floriography	Recantation
Lucern		Floriography	Life
Love-in-a-mist		Floriography	You puzzle me, perplexity
Love lies bleeding		Floriography	Hopelessness, not heartless
Lupine		Floriography	Voraciousness; imagination

=== M ===
Plant		Culture	Meaning
Magnolia		Floriography	Perseverance, love of nature, nobility faithfulness
Mallow		Floriography	Consumed by love; beneficence; sweet disposition
Maple	general		Love, longevity, money;
Maple	general	Native American	Generosity, balance, promise;
Maple	general	Nahkawē	Protection
Maple	general	Ojibwe	Redemption
Maple	Field maple and sycamore maple	Europe and the Alps	Farming
Marigold
Marigold	General	Floriography	Pain and grief, jealousy; cruelty; (with cypress) despair
Marigold	African	Floriography	Vulgar minds
Marigold	French	Floriography	Jealousy
Marigold	Prophetic	Floriography	Prediction
Marjoram		Floriography	Blushes
Marvel of Peru		Floriography	Timidity
Mayflower			Welcome
Meadow saffron		Floriography	"My best days are past"
Meadowsweet		Floriography	Beauty, happiness, peace, protection; uselessness
Mezereon		Floriography	Coquetry, desire to please
Mignonette		Floriography	Worth; "Your qualities surpass your charms", health and moral beauty
Milkwort		Floriography	Hermitage
Mint	General		Money, love, desire, healing, exorcism, protection, travel
Mint	General	Floriography	Virtue;
Mint	Peppermint or spearmint	Floriography	Warmth of feeling
Mistletoe			Life, strength over death, light, overcoming darkness
Moonflower			Dreaming of love
Moonwort		Floriography	Forgetfulness
Morning glory		Floriography	Repose; affection
Mudwort		Floriography	Tranquility
Mulberry
Mulberry	black	Floriography	I will not survive you
Mulberry	white	Floriography	Wisdom
Mullein		Floriography	Good-nature
Myrrh			Spirituality, motherhood, the deities Myrrha and Adonis
Myrrh		Christianity	Christ's humanity
Myrtle		Ancient Greece	Marriage, the goddess Aphrodite
Myrtle		Ancient Rome	Joy, triumph, fertility in marriage
Myrtle		Floriography	Love, home, duty; love in absence
Myrtle		Judaism	Peace and well-being

=== N ===
Plant		Culture	Meaning
Narcissus	general	Floriography	self-love, egotism, formality; selfishness, unshared love, good luck, wealth
Narcissus	Bunch-flowered	China	Good fortune, happiness
Nasturtium		Floriography	Patriotism, conquest, victory in battle; heroism
Nemophila		Floriography	Prosperity
Nettle (stinging)			Life and death, protection as in Shakespeare's Hamlet; Cruelty;
Nettle (stinging)		Floriography	Slander
Nightshade	general	Floriography	Falsehood; dark thoughts, scepticism
Nightshade	Bittersweet	Floriography	truth
Nightshade	Deadly	Floriography	death; silence
Nightshade	Enchanter's	Floriography	Spells, witchcraft, sorcery

=== O ===
Plant		Culture	Meaning
Oak	general		Resistance, durability, power, vigor, courage, protection, healing, money, fertility, health, good luck
Oak	general	Ancient Rome	marriage, victory
Oak	general	Celtic tradition	Symbol of the god Donar, protection, beauty, fertility
Oak	general	Native American	Character, courage
Oak	leaf	Floriography	Strength; Hospitality; bravery; honor
Oats		Floriography	Music; country life
Oleander		Floriography	Beware
Olive			Healing, fertility, protection, desire
Olive		Classical antiquity	Eternal life
Olive		Floriography	Peace
Orange tree	general		Virginity, generosity
Orange tree	general	Ancient Rome	Marriage
Orange tree	general	Andalusian and Haitian folklore	Fairness, justice
Orange tree	blossom	Floriography	Innocence, purity, eternal love, marriage; chastity
Orchid	general		Intersex human rights; love, durability
Orchid	general	Ancient Mediterranean	Lust
Orchid	general	Ancient Rome	Fertility and reproduction;
Orchid	general	Floriography	Refined beauty;
Orchid	Bee	Floriography	Error
Orchid	Bumblebee	Floriography	Industry
Orchid	Butterfly	Floriography	Gaiety
Orchid	Cymbidium	China	Feminine beauty, integrity, nobility, self-restraint, holiness, humility; refinement, lifelong friendship
Orchid	Dragon's mouth	Floriography	Fear
Orchid	Fall coral-root	Floriography	Danger
Orchid	Monk's head	Victorian culture	Female sexuality, sexual perversion
Orchid	Showy	Floriography	A belle
Orchid	Spider orchid, early or late	Floriography	Skill
Orchid	White egret orchid		I'll be thinking of you even in my dreams
Orchid	Yellow lady's slipper	Floriography	Fickleness
Ox-eye daisy		Floriography	Patience

=== P-Q ===
Plant		Culture	Meaning
Pansy/Heart's-ease		Floriography	Thoughtfulness, merriment, remembrance, you occupy my thoughts; "Think of me"
Passionflower		Christianity	The Crucifixion
Passionflower		Floriography	Belief, susceptibility, religious superstition;
Peach	tree		Love, hope, fertility
Peach	blossom	China	Matrimony
Peach	blossom	Floriography	Long-life, generosity, bridal hope, charm; "I am your captive"
Peach	fruit	China	Longevity
Pear	general		Desire, love
Pear	blossom	Floriography	Lasting friendship; affection; comfort;
Peony			Beauty, protection, virility, exorcism;
Peony		China	Prosperity, honor
Peony		Japan	Masculinity, bravery
Peony		Floriography	Bashfulness, happy marriage, prosperity; shame
Periwinkle	blue	Floriography	Early and sincere friendship
Periwinkle	white	Floriography	Pleasures of memory; tender recollections
Persimmon		China	Luck in business
Persimmon		Florography	"Bury me amid nature's beauties"
Peruvian Lily			Wealth, fortune, prosperity, friendship
Pewen/Monkey-puzzle		Mapuche tradition	Motherhood, protection, bridge to the spirit world
Phlox		Floriography	Harmony, unanimity, "our souls are united"
Pine	general		
Pine	general	China	Longevity, prosperity, leadership
Pine	general	Floriography	Philosophy
Pine	Pitch pine	Floriography	Time and faith
Pineapple		Floriography	"You are perfect"
Pink	General	Floriography	Boldness, (single) pure love
Pink	China	Floriography	Aversion
Pink	Mountain	Floriography	Aspiring
Pink	Red	Floriography	(double) Pure and ardent love
Pink	Variegated	Floriography	Refusal
Pink	White	Floriography	Ingeniousness, talent
Plum	general		Healing, beauty
Plum	blossom	China	Inner beauty, modesty, luck, wealth
Plum	blossom	Floriography	Beauty and longevity; "Keep your promises"; fidelity;
Plum	Chinese plum	China	Longevity, female chastity, beauty, joy of youth regardless of age
Plum	Indian plum	Floriography	Privation
Plumeria/frangipani			Perfection, springtime, new beginnings; national flower of Laos,
Plumeria/frangipani		Southeast Asia	Immortality, arrival of Kuntilanak/Pontianak or Aswang
Poinsettia			Christmas spirit
Poinsettia		Floriography	Brilliance;
Polyanthus	General	Floriography	Pride of riches
Polyanthus	crimson	Floriography	The hearts mystery
Polyanthus	lilac	Floriography	Confidence
Pomegranate	fruit	Abrahamic	Holiness, the commandments of God, unity of the church;
Pomegranate	fruit	Ancient Greece	Love and beauty, enticement, marriage, imprisonment, the underworld; female fertility
Pomegranate	fruit	Ancient Rome	Fertility;
Pomegranate	fruit	China	Many sons, the smile of a beautiful girl
Pomegranate	fruit	Floriography	Foolishness
Pomegranate	flower	Floriography	Mature elegance
Poplar	Black	Ancient Greece	Mourning, sacred to Persephone; death, the underworld, sterility
Poplar	Black	Floriography	Courage
Poplar	White	Ancient Greece	Heracles and his labours; the underworld, sacred to Hades and Zeus
Poplar	White	Floriography	Time
Poppy	general	Ancient Rome	Fertility; laziness
Poppy	general	Floriography	Consolation; imagination; evanescent pleasures, fantastic extravagance;
Poppy	Opium poppy		Sleep, remembrance, death
Poppy	Opium poppy	Ancient Greece	The deities Hypnos, Demeter; Morpheus, Aphrodite, and Persephone; fertility, oblivion, yearly death of nature
Poppy	Red poppy		Sacrifice, remembrance; the blood of fallen soldiers; love, money, good luck
Poppy	Red poppy	China	Rest, beauty, success
Poppy	Red poppy	Christianity	The passion, death, and blood of Christ
Poppy	Red poppy	Floriography	Pleasure;
Poppy	scarlet	Floriography	Fantastic extravagance
Poppy	white	Floriography	Dreams, modern, peace; "my bane, my antidote"; consolation; time
Poppy	yellow	Floriography	Wealth, success
Prickly pear		Floriography	Satire
Primrose	General	Floriography	Eternal love; Childhood; I can't live without you
Primrose	red	Floriography	Unpatronized merit
Protea		Floriography	Courage, transformation, daring, resourcefulness, diversity
Quaking grass		Floriography	Agitation
Queen Anne's Lace		Floriography	Haven, sanctuary; complexity, delicateness
Queen of the Night		Floriography	Enjoy small moments because they do not last; transient beauty
Quince	General		Fertility, love
Quince	General	Ancient Greece	The goddess Aphrodite, thought to be the Apple of Discord
Quince	General	Floriography	Temptation
Quince	Japanese	Floriography	Fairies' fire

=== R ===
Plant		Culture	Meaning
Ragged-robin		Floriography	Wit
Rainflower			Rebirth, new beginnings, great expectations
Ranunculus		Floriography	"You are radiant with charms"; ingratitude
Rhododendron		Floriography	Danger, beware, I am dangerous
Rice			Protection, rain, fertility, money
Rose	general		Transgender day of remembrance; the goddesses Aphrodite and Venus, beauty
Rose	general	Celtic tradition	Love, loyalty, midsummer
Rose	general	Christianity	Christ, Mary, the Immaculate Conception, the Pope, martyrdom, charity
Rose	general	Hinduism	Perfection, completeness, the soul
Rose	general	Islam	Masculine beauty, Muhammad and his sons
Rose	general	Floriography	Love; silence, privacy, conversations held in confidence;
Rose	red		Burning love, immortal love, passion, health, sacrifice
Rose	red	Floriography	True love; bashful love;
Rose	black		Death, hatred, despair, sorrow, mystery, danger, obsession
Rose	blue		Mystery, attaining the impossible, love at first sight
Rose	burgundy	Floriography	Unconscious beauty
Rose	pink		First love, innocence, admiration, healing
Rose	pink	Ancient Rome	commemoration of the dead
Rose	dark pink	Floriography	Gratitude
Rose	light pink	Floriography	Desire, passion, joy of life, youth, energy; grace
Rose	coral or orange	Floriography	Desire, fascination
Rose	lavender or violet	Floriography	Love at first sight; enchantment
Rose	yellow		Aromanticism, friendship
Rose	yellow	Floriography	Friendship, joy, gladness; apology, intense emotion, undying love; extreme betrayal, a broken heart, infidelity, jealousy;
Rose	yellow	Islam	Deceit, adultery
Rose	white		purity, respect, mysticism, planted on graves of children
Rose	white	Ancient Greece	Bribery
Rose	white	Celtic tradition	Peace in the afterlife
Rose	white	Floriography	I am worthy of you; secrecy;
Rose	dried white rose	Floriography	Sorrow; death is preferable to loss of virtue; transient impressions
Rose	red and white together	Floriography	Unity
Rose	red and yellow together	Floriography	Joy, happiness and excitement
Rose	thornless	Floriography	Love at first sight
Rose	dead	Floriography	sweet memories
Rose	bud (red)	Floriography	Beauty, purity, love, youth
Rose	bud (white)	Floriography	Girlhood; a heart unacquainted with love
Rose	bud (moss)	Floriography	Confession of love
Rose	Austrian	Floriography	"Thou art all that is lovely," loveliness
Rose	bridal	Floriography	Happy love
Rose	Carolina	Floriography	Love is dangerous
Rose	China	Floriography	Beauty always new
Rose	Damask	Floriography	Brilliant complexion; blushing beauty
Rose	Dog	Floriography	Pleasure and pain
Rose	Gallic	Ancient Greece	Love, sacred to Aphrodite
Rose	Hundred-leaved (also called cabbage rose or moss rose)	Floriography	Grace; Pride; ambassador of love; superior merit; dignity of mind
Rose	Maiden's blush	Floriography	"If you love me you will find out"
Rose	Multiflora	Floriography	Grace
Rose	Musk	Floriography	Capricious beauty, (in a cluster) charming
Rosemary		Floriography	Remembrance; "Your presence revives me"
Rowan		Celtic tradition	Protection, faeries, the otherworld
Rue		Floriography	Regret, sorrow, repentance; grace, clear vision; disdain
Rush		Scottish folklore	Faeries, passage to the otherworld

=== S ===
Plant		Culture	Meaning
Sage		Floriography	Health, wisdom, respect; domestic virtue; esteem
Sainfoin		Floriography	Agitation
Scabius		Floriography	Unfortunate attachment, I have lost all, widowhood
Schinus		Floriography	Religious enthusiasm
Sensitive plant		Floriography	Sensitivity, modesty; timidity; sensibility
Sesame		Ancient Greece	Fertility
Sequoia			resilience, longevity, and strength
Shamrock			Good luck, protection from snakes
Shamrock		Christianity	The Trinity
Shamrock		Irish druidic	The three departments of nature, sea, earth, and heaven
Shamrock		Floriography	Light heartedness
Snapdragon		Floriography	Presumption, deception, a gracious lady
Snowdrop		Floriography	Consolation or hope;friend in need
Snowdrop		England	Purity, humility, and innocence
Snowdrop		France	Hope and friendship in adversity
Snowdrop		Germany	Youthful love and simplicity
Speedwell		Floriography	Travel, kindness, protection; (female) loyalty
Spider lily
Spider lily	red		abandonment, loss, separation, death and the cycle of rebirth. It's commonly referred to as the Flower of Death
Spider lily	white		Positive nature, new beginnings, good health and rebirth
Spider lily	yellow		Happiness, light, wisdom, gratitude, strength, everlasting friendship
Spider lily	pink		Feminine love, beauty and passion
Spiderwort		Floriography	"Esteem not love"; transient happiness
Spindle tree		Floriography	Your image is engraved on my heart
Sorrel
Sorrel	wood		good luck, happiness, and prosperity
Sorrel	french		Protection
Sorrel	sheep's		bitterness arising from feelings of injustice
Sorrel	red		healing, protection health, and vitality
St John's Wort		Floriography	Superstition; animosity
Star of Bethlehem		Floriography	Atonement, reconciliation; purity; guidance
Straw		Floriography	United, union; (broken) a broken agreement
Statice		Floriography	Remembrance, sympathy, success
Stock
Stock	general	Floriography	Lasting beauty, "you'll always be beautiful to me," a happy life, bonds of affection
Stock	Ten-week stock	Floriography	Promptness
Stonecrop		Floriography	Tranquility
Sundew			resilience, survival, mystery, allure, adaptability, and hidden power
Sunflower		Floriography	Loft thoughts; adoration and pride; false riches
Sweetbrier		Floriography	Simplicity (American), a wound to heal (European); poetry; home
Sweet flag / calamus			Gay male love
Sweet flag / calamus		Ancient Greece	Phallic symbol, sacred to Pan, whose panpipes were made of its reeds, and Dionysos
Sweetpea		Floriography	Delicate pleasures; departure
Sweet sultan		Floriography	Happiness; felicity
Sweet William		Floriography	Finesse, gallantry

=== T ===
Plant		Culture	Meaning
Tansy		Floriography	I declare war on you; resistance; luck, innocence, desire, simplicity, purity
Thistle			Nobility, endurance, warning;Scottish national identity
Thistle		Floriography	Surliness; austerity;
Trillium			Bisexuality
Trillium		Christianity	The Holy Trinity
Thorn-apple		Floriography	Disguise, deceitful charms; "I dreamed of thee"
Thrift		Floriography	Sympathy
Thyme		Floriography	Activity
Tree peony		China	Masculinity, brightness, distinction, good luck, riches, honor
Tuberose		Floriography	Dangerous pleasures; voluptuousness; a sweet voice
Tulip-tree			Fame
Tulip	general		Hopeless love, richness, beauty, divinity;
Tulip	general	Floriography	love and passion;
Tulip	general	India and Turkey	Consuming love
Tulip	general	Turkey	Inconstancy
Tulip	red	Floriography	Declaration of love
Tulip	pink		Caring, Good wishes, Friendship, Joyful Occasions, Confidence
Tulip	purple		Nobility/Royalty, Rebirth, Spring
Tulip	white	Floriography	Forgiveness, Remembrance, Sincerity; "I am worthy of you"
Tulip	yellow	Floriography	Cheerful thoughts, Sunshine, Hope, Desperate love, "There's sunshine in your smile"; hopeless love
Tulip	blue		Respect, Tranquility, Trust
Tulip	orange		Understanding, Appreciation, Truest love
Tulip	black		Power, Strength, Supreme elegance
Tulip	variegated	Floriography	Beautiful eyes, a declaration of love

=== V ===
Plant		Culture	Meaning
Valerian		Floriography	Readiness, an accommodating disposition
Venus flytrap		Floriography	Deceit
Venus' Looking Glass		Floriography	Flattery
Vervain		Floriography	Enchantment; sensibility, sensitivity
Violet	general		Love, protection, good luck, desire, peace, healing, belief, modesty, abidance;
Violet	blue	Floriography	Faithfulness, watchfulness, I'll always be true
Violet	purple		Lesbian love; thoughts occupied with love
Violet	yellow	Floriography	Rural happiness
Violet	white	Floriography	Modesty, innocence, candor; let's take a chance
Violet	sweet	Floriography	Modesty
Virgin's bower		Floriography	Filial affection; mental beauty, artifice
Volkameria		Floriography	May you be happy

=== W ===
Plant		Culture	Meaning
Wallflower		Floriography	Unchangeable affection and fidelity in misfortune
Walnut			Health, desires
Walnut		Christianity	Power of the Holy Ghost
Walnut		Floriography	Intellect, stratagem;
Water lily	General	Ancient Egypt	The sun, cycle of life, rebirth
Water lily	General	Floriography	Purity of heart; eloquence;
Water lily	Blue	Ancient Egypt	Daytime
Water lily	White	Ancient Egypt	Nighttime
Water lily	White	Ancient Greece	modesty
Watermelon			Palestinian nationalism; Kherson liberation; Abrosexuality
Willow	general		Love, divinisation, protection, health;
Willow	general	China	Meekness, springtime, femininity, exorcism
Willow	Creeping	Floriography	Love forsaken
Willow	French	Floriography	Bravery and humanity
Willow	Weeping	Floriography	Mourning
Willowherb		Floriography	Pretension
Winged seeds (any kind)			Messengers
Winterberry			Protection, luck
Wisteria		Floriography	Welcoming
Witch-hazel		Floriography	A magic spell
Woad		Floriography	Design
Wheat			Fertility
Wheat		Floriography	Wealth, prosperity;
Wolfsbane		Floriography	Misanthropy, chivalry; knight-errantry
Wormwood		Floriography	Absence, bitter sorrow, do not be discouraged
Wutong / Chinese parasol tree		China	Togetherness, peaceful or successful rulers

=== X-Z ===
Plant		Culture	Meaning
Xanthium		Floriography	Rudeness, pertinacity
Xeranthemum		Floriography	Cheerfulness under adversity
Yarrow		Floriography	Healing; war
Yew		Celtic tradition	Immortality; sacred places, death, transformation
Yew		Floriography	Sorrow;
Ylang-Ylang			Never-ending love
Zinnia	general	Floriography	Thinking of you; remembering absent friends, sentimentality
Zinnia	magenta	Floriography	Lasting affection
Zinnia	scarlet	Floriography	Constancy
Zinnia	white	Floriography	Goodness

== See also ==
- Language of flowers – cryptological communication through the use or arrangement of flowers
- Hanakotoba, also known as 花言葉 – Japanese form of the language of flowers
- List of national flowers – flowers that represent specific geographic areas
- Plants in culture – uses of plants by humans
- Narcissus in culture – uses of narcissus flowers by humans
- Lime tree in culture – uses of the lime (linden) tree by humans
- Rose symbolism – a more expansive list of symbolic meanings of the rose
- Apple (symbolism) – a more expansive list of symbolic means for apples
