= Everlasting pea =

Everlasting pea may refer to several perennial plants of the genus Lathyrus:

- Lathyrus latifolius, the broad-leaved everlasting pea
- Lathyrus rotundifolius, the Persian everlasting pea
- Lathyrus grandiflorus, the two-flowered everlasting pea
- Lathyrus sylvestris, the narrow-leaved everlasting pea
