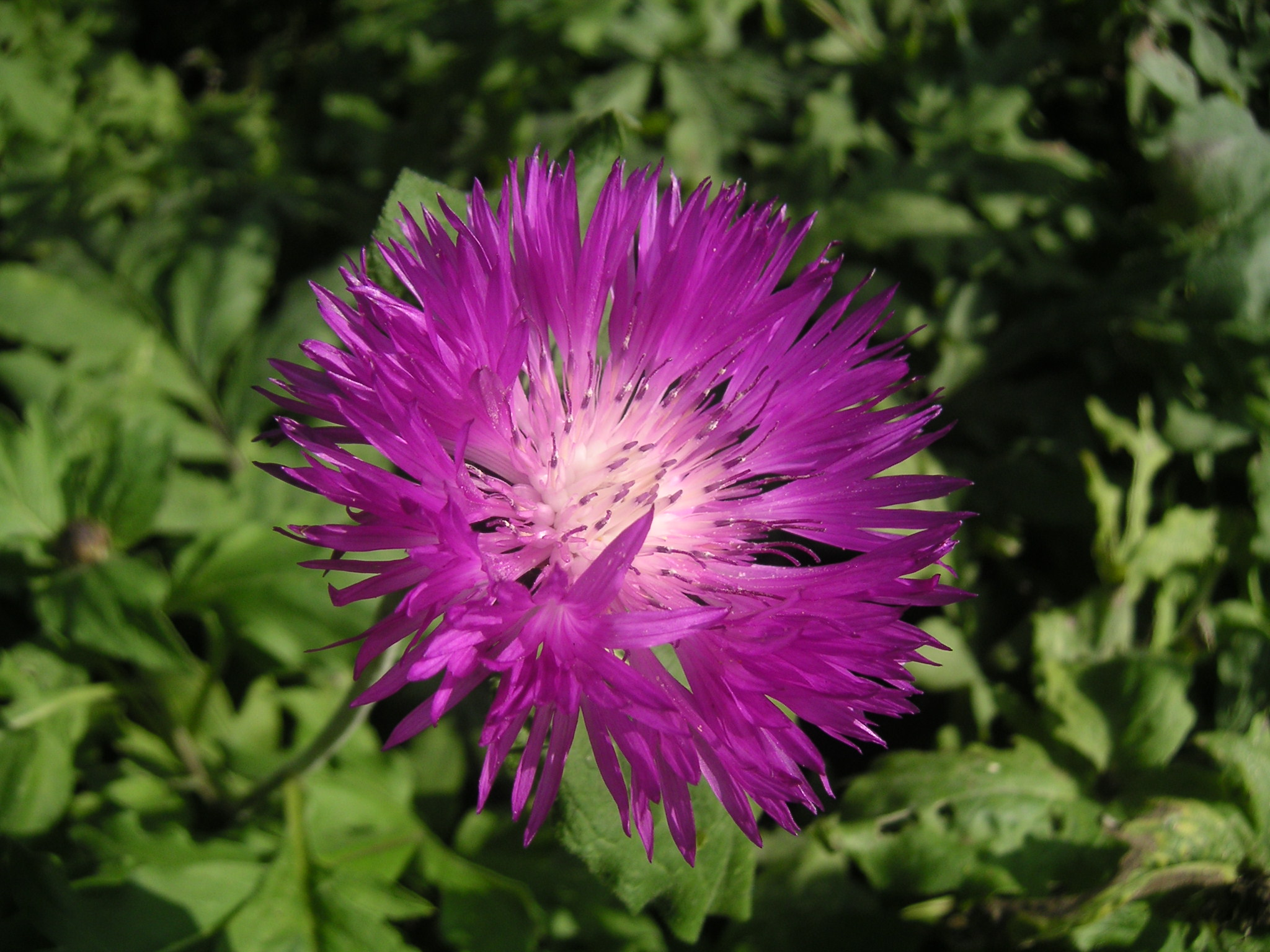

Scientific classification
- Kingdom: Plantae
- Clade: Tracheophytes
- Clade: Angiosperms
- Clade: Eudicots
- Clade: Asterids
- Order: Asterales
- Family: Asteraceae
- Genus: Psephellus
- Species: P. dealbatus

Binomial name
- Psephellus dealbatus K.Koch

Synonyms
- Centaurea baksanica Czerep.; Centaurea cabardensis (Koss ex Tschuchr.) Czerep.; Centaurea dealbata Willd.; Centaurea kachetica Rehmann ex Gugler; Centaurea nogmovii (Koss ex Tschuchr.) Czerep.; Centaurea procumbens Hablitz; Centaurea tschuchrukidzei Czerep.; Psephellus cabardensis Koss ex Tschuchr.; Psephellus calocephalus Cass.; Psephellus kacheticus Rehmann ex Boiss.; Psephellus lactiflorus Koss ex Tschuchr.; Psephellus lazicus Boiss.; Psephellus nogmovii Koss ex Tschuchr.; Psephellus sosnowskyi Tschuchr.

= Psephellus dealbatus =

Species of flowering plant

Psephellus dealbatus, the Persian cornflower or whitewash cornflower, is a species of Psephellus native to the Caucasus Mountains and Turkey. It is widely cultivated as an ornamental perennial.

== Description ==
The flowers of P. dealbatus resemble those of Centaurea americana in colour and form; the composite inflorescence has rosy outer florets shading to cream in the center of the 2 in. disk, surrounded by scaly bracts on a slender peduncle 18 to 24 in. long. The blooming period is in early summer.

Psephellus dealbatus is most noteworthy for its leaves. Like those of Centaurea moschata they are divided, but unlike the latter the division is quite regular. The undersides of the leaves are covered in silver hairs.

== Taxonomy ==
The Latin epithet of dealbatus derived from the Late Latin verb dealbare 'to whitewash'. It was first published and described by German botanist Karl Koch in Linnaea Vol.24 on page 438 in 1851.

== Range ==
It is native to north Caucasus, Transcaucasia and Turkey but has also been introduced to Austria, the Baltic States, Belgium, Czechoslovakia, Germany, Great Britain and Poland.

== Cultivation ==
Psephellus dealbatus is widely cultivated as an ornamental, though it is not as well known as some other members of the Asteraceae. It is widely adaptable and drought-tolerant. The flowers attract butterflies and bees. It self-seeds to a degree.

The cultivar 'Steenbergii' is recognized, and several cultivars are available.

Sources tracking weed species generally classify it as a "casual alien"; that is, it escapes from gardens but is not invasive. In some areas of the United States it has naturalized.

== Other sources ==
- Saylor, Jesse. "Centaurea dealbata". Michigan State University.
- "Global Compendium of Weeds: Centaurea dealbata". Hawaiian Ecosystems at Risk project.
- "PLANTS Profile for Centaurea dealbata". United States Department of Agriculture.
- "Heritage Perennial Profile: Centaurea dealbata". perennials.com.
