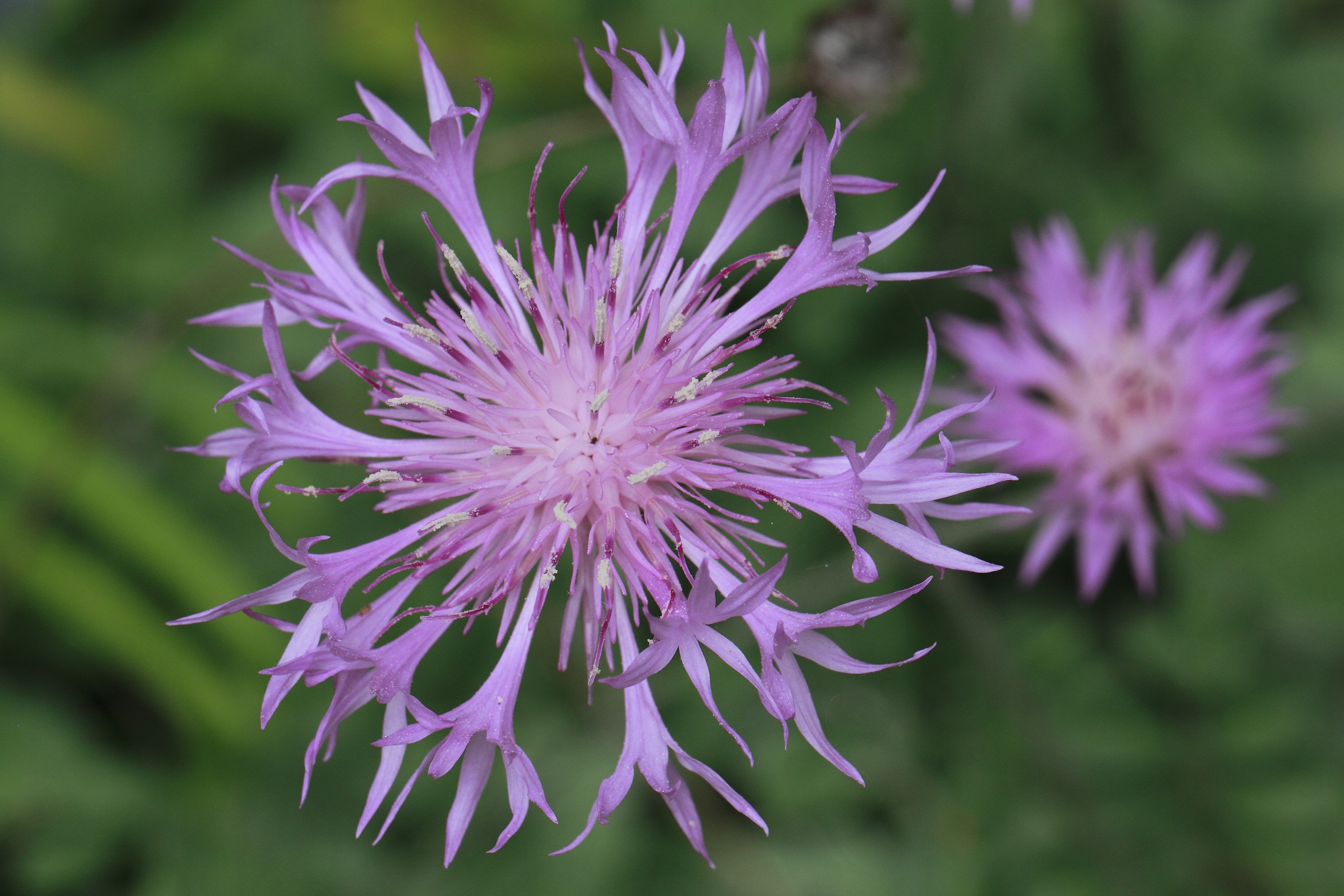
- Flowers of Psephellus bellus
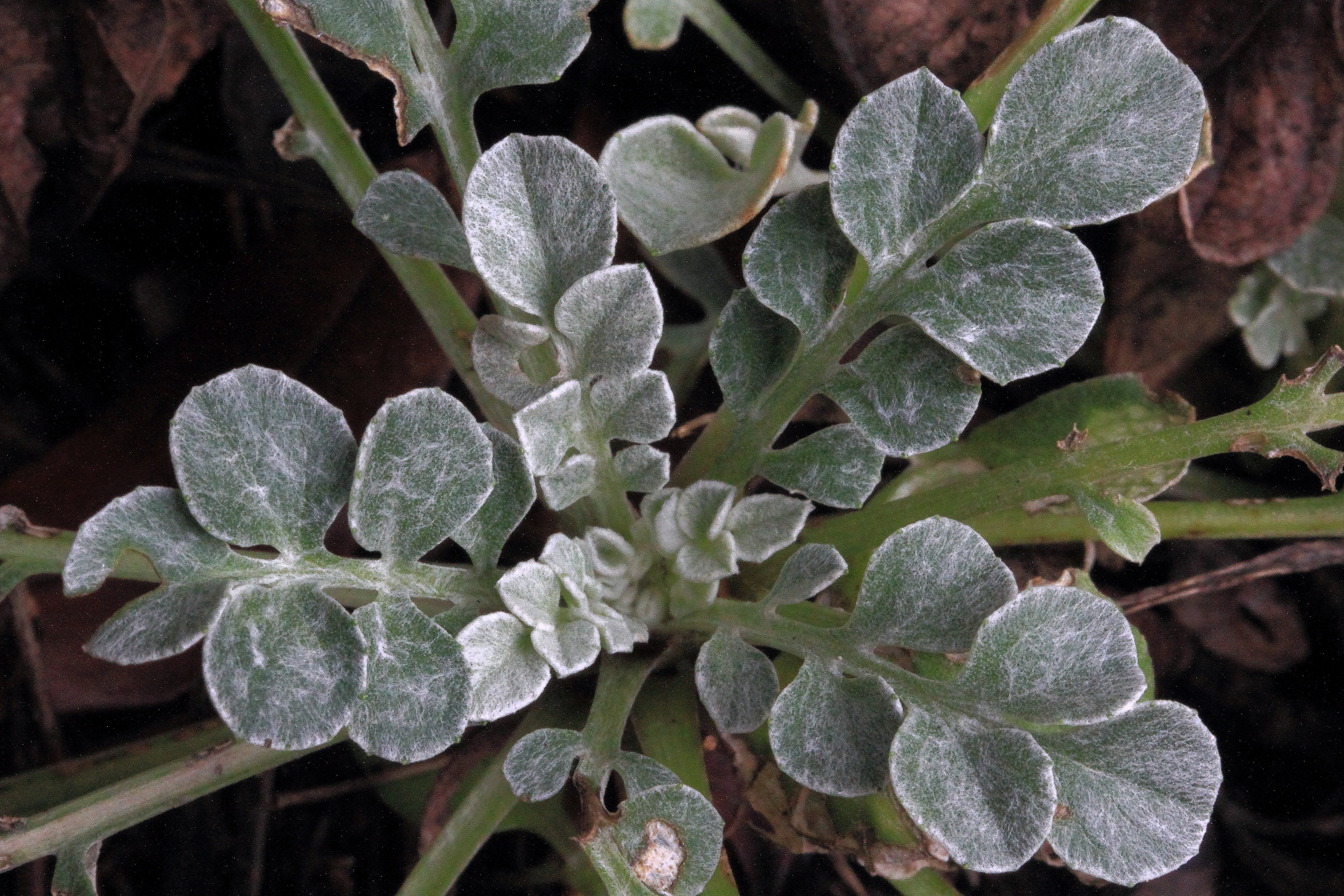
- The gray-green to silvery tomentose leaves of Psephellus bellus

Scientific classification
- Kingdom: Plantae
- Clade: Embryophytes
- Clade: Tracheophytes
- Clade: Spermatophytes
- Clade: Angiosperms
- Clade: Eudicots
- Clade: Asterids
- Order: Asterales
- Family: Asteraceae
- Tribe: Cardueae
- Subtribe: Centaureinae
- Genus: Psephellus
- Species: P. bellus

Binomial name
- Psephellus bellus (Trautv.) Wagenitz

Synonyms
- Centaurea bella

= Psephellus bellus =

Species of flowering plant

Psephellus bellus is a species in the genus Psephellus, subtribe Centaureinae, found in Anatolia and Transcaucasia. It is an evergreen plant, with gray-green to silvery imparipinnate leaves showing elliptic to ovate leaflets. It is used in gardening because the creeping stems can root in contact to the ground, and the plant grows slowly into a dense cover. The flowers are purplish pink and bloom from March to June.
