= Human uses of plants =

Uses of plants by humans

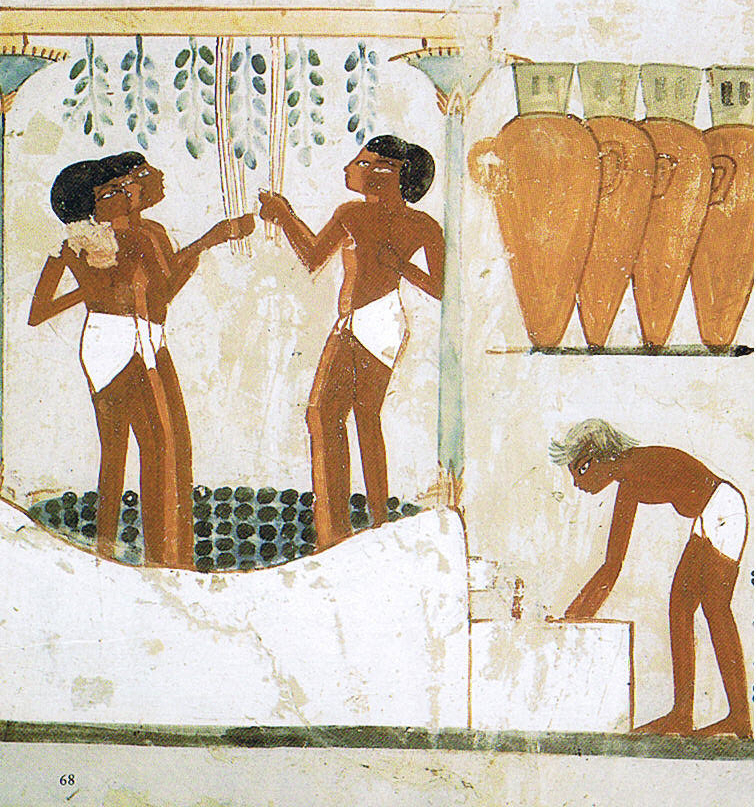
Grapes being trodden to extract the juice and made into wine in storage jars. Tomb of Nakht, 18th dynasty, Thebes, Ancient Egypt

Human uses of plants include both practical uses, such as for food, clothing, and medicine, and symbolic uses, such as in art, mythology and literature. Materials derived from plants are collectively called plant products.

Edible plants have long been a source of nutrition for humans, and the reliable provision of food through agriculture and horticulture is the basis of civilization since the Neolithic Revolution. Medicinal herbs were and still remain to be the key ingredients of many traditional medicine practices, as well as being raw materials for some modern pharmaceuticals. The study of plant uses by native peoples is ethnobotany, while economic botany focuses on modern cultivated plants. Plants are also used as feedstock for many industrial products including timber, paper and textiles, as well as a wide range of chemicals.

Ornamental plants give millions of people pleasure through gardening, and floriculture is a popular pastime among many. Viticulture and winemaking can provide both culinary and economic values to society. In art, mythology, religion, literature and film, plants play important roles, symbolising themes such as fertility, growth, purity, and rebirth. In architecture and the decorative arts, plants provide many themes, such as Islamic arabesques and the acanthus forms carved on to classical Corinthian order column capitals.

== Context ==
Culture consists of the social behaviour and norms found in human societies and transmitted through social learning. Cultural universals in all human societies include expressive forms like art, music, dance, ritual, religion, and technologies like tool usage, cooking, shelter, and clothing. The concept of material culture covers physical expressions such as technology, architecture and art, whereas immaterial culture includes principles of social organization, mythology, philosophy, literature, and science. This article describes the many roles played by plants in human culture.

== Practical uses ==
=== As food ===
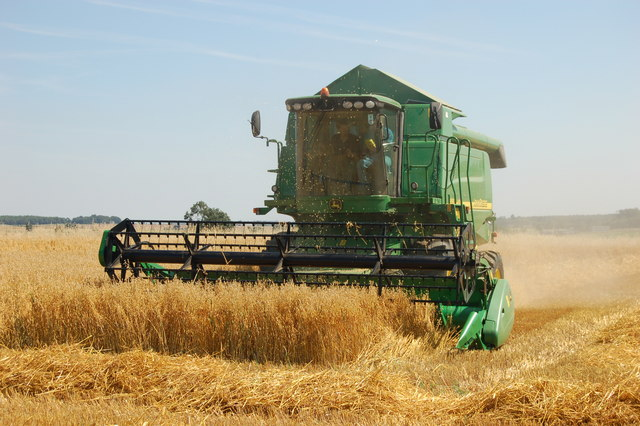
Harvesting oats

Humans depend on plants for food, either directly or as feed for domestic animals. Agriculture deals with the production of food crops, and has played a key role in the history of world civilizations. Agriculture includes agronomy for arable crops, horticulture for vegetables and fruit, and forestry for timber. About 7,000 species of plant have been used for food, though most of today's food is derived from only 30 species. The major staples include cereals such as rice and wheat, starchy roots and tubers such as cassava and potato, and legumes such as peas and beans. Vegetable oils such as olive oil provide lipids, while fruit and vegetables contribute vitamins and minerals to the diet.

=== In industry ===
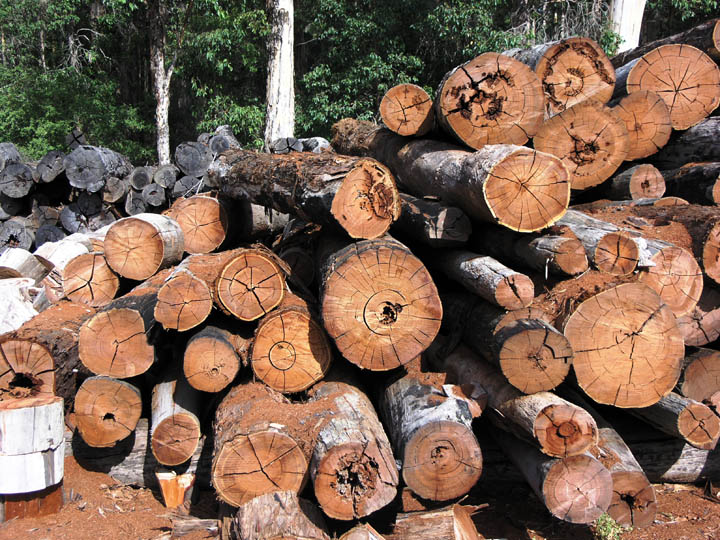
Timber

Plants grown as industrial crops are the source of a wide range of products used in manufacturing, sometimes so intensively as to risk harm to the environment. Nonfood products include essential oils, natural dyes, pigments, waxes, resins, tannins, alkaloids, amber and cork. Products derived from plants include soaps, shampoos, perfumes, cosmetics, paint, varnish, turpentine, rubber, latex, lubricants, linoleum, plastics, inks, and gums. Renewable fuels from plants include firewood, peat and other biofuels. The fossil fuels coal, petroleum and natural gas are derived from the remains of aquatic organisms including phytoplankton in geological time.

Structural materials and fibres from plants are used to construct dwellings and to manufacture clothing. Wood is used not only for buildings, boats, and furniture, but also for smaller items such as musical instruments, hand tools, and sports equipment. Wood is pulped to make paper and cardboard. Cloth is often made from cotton, flax, ramie or synthetic fibres such as rayon and acetate derived from plant cellulose. Thread used to sew cloth likewise comes in large part from cotton.

Plants are a primary source of basic chemicals, both for their medicinal and physiological effects, and for the industrial synthesis of a vast array of organic chemicals.

=== In medicine ===
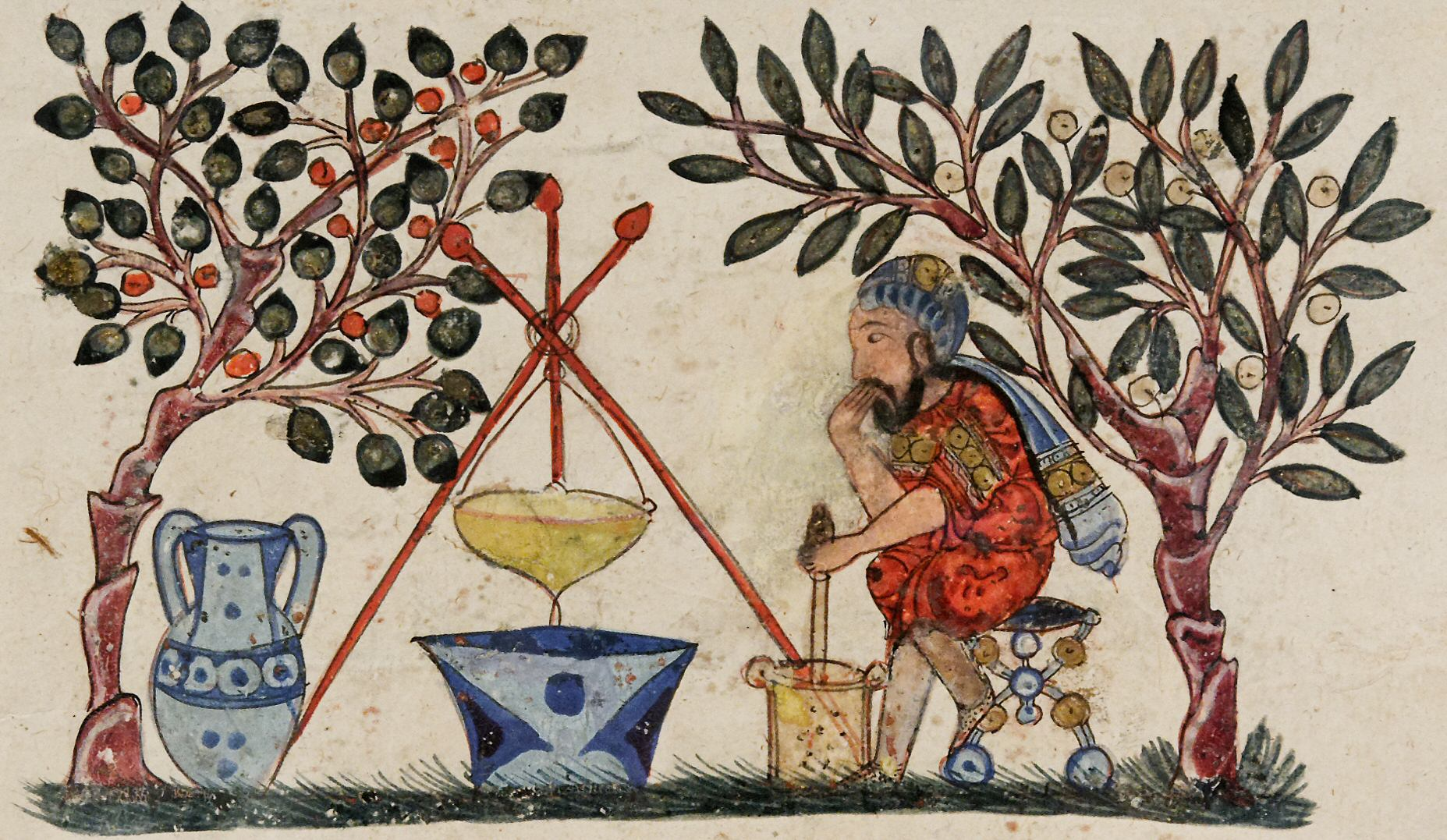
A physician preparing an elixir, from an Arabic version of Dioscorides's pharmacopoeia, 1224

Many hundreds of medicines are derived from plants, both traditional medicines used in herbalism and chemical substances purified from plants or first identified in them, sometimes by ethnobotanical search, and then synthesised for use in modern medicine. Modern medicines derived from plants include aspirin, taxol, morphine, quinine, reserpine, colchicine, digitalis and vincristine. Plants used in herbalism include ginkgo, echinacea, feverfew, and Saint John's wort. The pharmacopoeia of Dioscorides, De Materia Medica, describing some 600 medicinal plants, was written between 50 and 70 AD and remained in use in Europe and the Middle East until around 1600 AD; it was the precursor of all modern pharmacopoeias.

=== In gardening ===
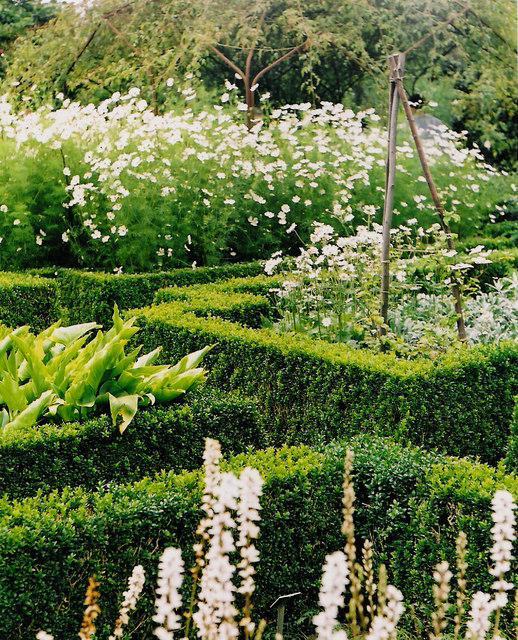
The white garden at Sissinghurst

Thousands of plant species are cultivated for aesthetic purposes as well as to provide shade, modify temperatures, reduce wind, abate noise, provide privacy, and prevent soil erosion. Plants are the basis of a multibillion-dollar per year tourism industry, which includes travel to historic gardens, national parks, rainforests, forests with colorful autumn leaves, and festivals such as Japan's and America's cherry blossom festivals.

There are also art forms specializing in the arrangement of cut or living plants, such as bonsai, ikebana, and the arrangement of cut or dried flowers. Ornamental plants have sometimes changed the course of history, as in tulipomania.

=== For chemicals ===
Pesticides derived from plants include nicotine, rotenone, strychnine and pyrethrins. Plants such as tobacco, cannabis, opium poppy, and coca yield psychotropic chemicals. Poisons from plants include atropine, ricin, hemlock and curare, though many of these also have medicinal uses.

=== In science ===
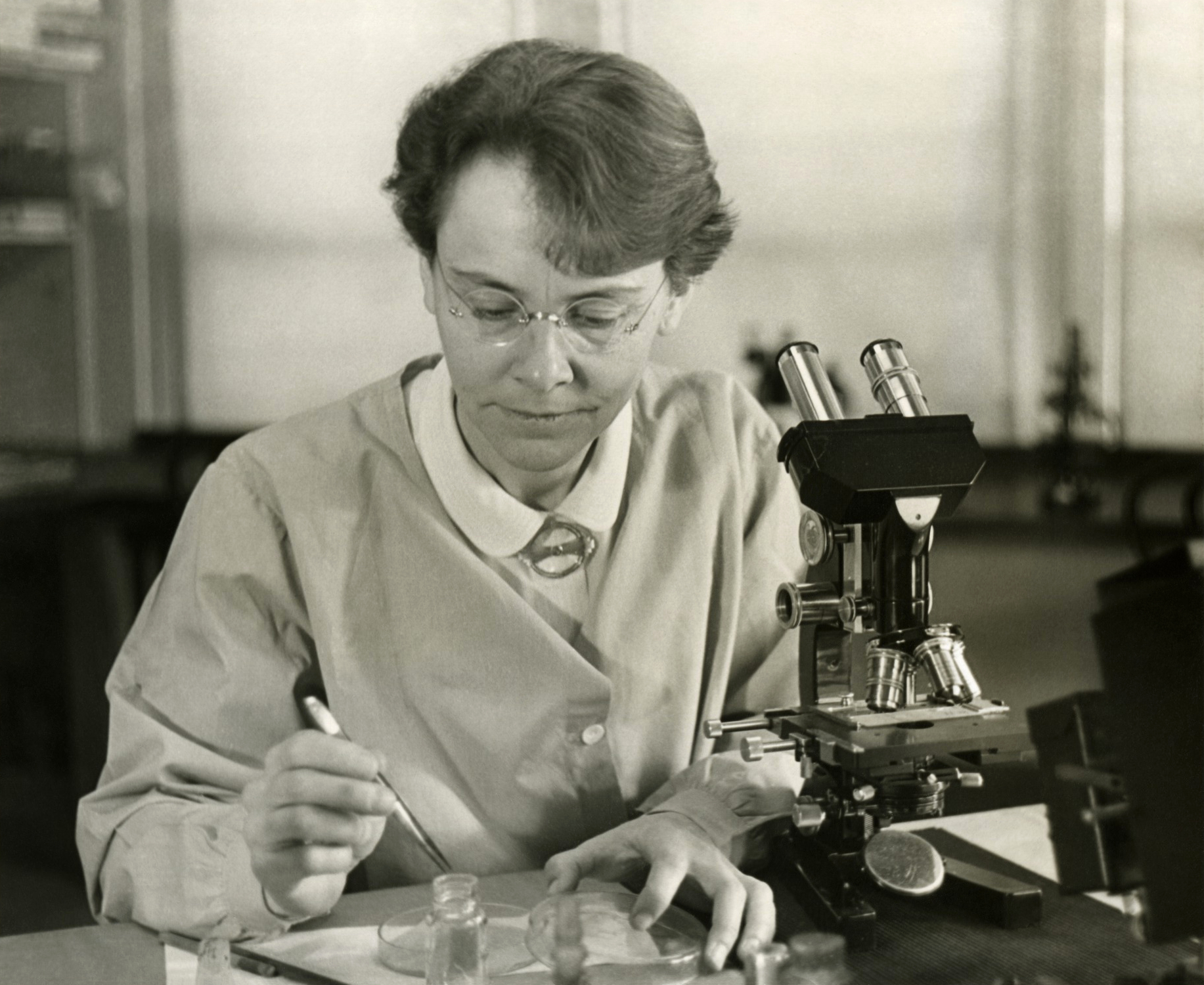
Barbara McClintock (1902–1992), a pioneering cytogeneticist who studied the mechanism of inheritance using maize

Basic biological research has often been done with plants. In genetics, the breeding of pea plants allowed Gregor Mendel to derive the basic laws governing inheritance, and examination of chromosomes in maize allowed Barbara McClintock to demonstrate their connection to inherited traits. The plant Arabidopsis thaliana is used in laboratories as a model organism to understand how genes control the growth and development of plant structures. NASA predicts that space stations or space colonies will one day rely on plants for life support.

Scientific advances in genetic engineering led to developments in crops. Genetically modified crops introduce new traits to plants which they do not have naturally. These can bring benefits such as a decrease in the use of harmful pesticides, by building in qualities such as insect resistance and herbicide tolerance.

=== Living structures ===
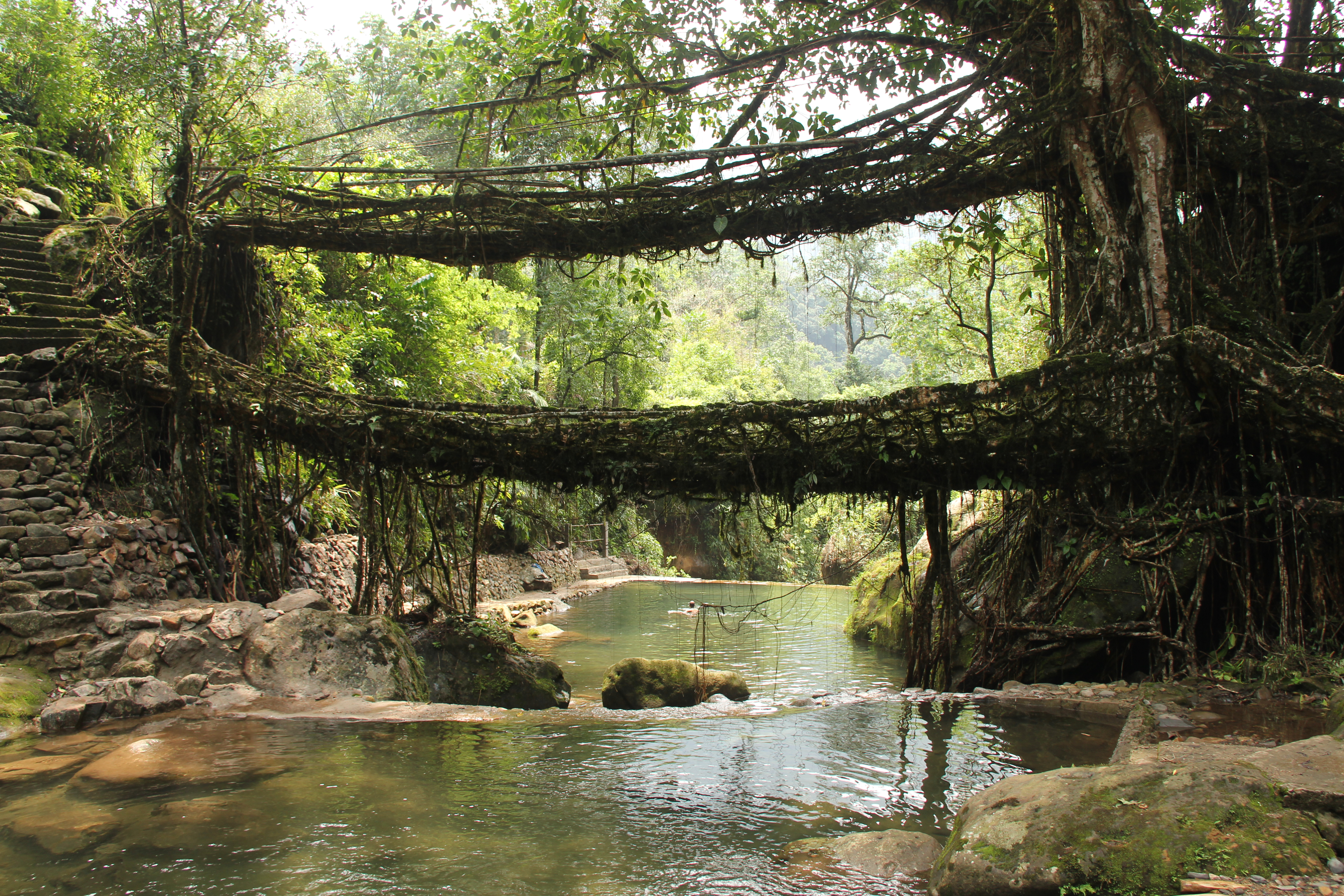
Two living root bridges in Meghalaya state, India

The ability of trees to graft is occasionally exploited by tree shaping to create living root bridges in Meghalaya and Nagaland states in India and on the islands of Sumatra and Java in Indonesia. The aerial roots of rubber fig trees, Ficus elastica, are used to form suspension bridges across mountain streams.

== Symbolic uses ==
=== In art ===
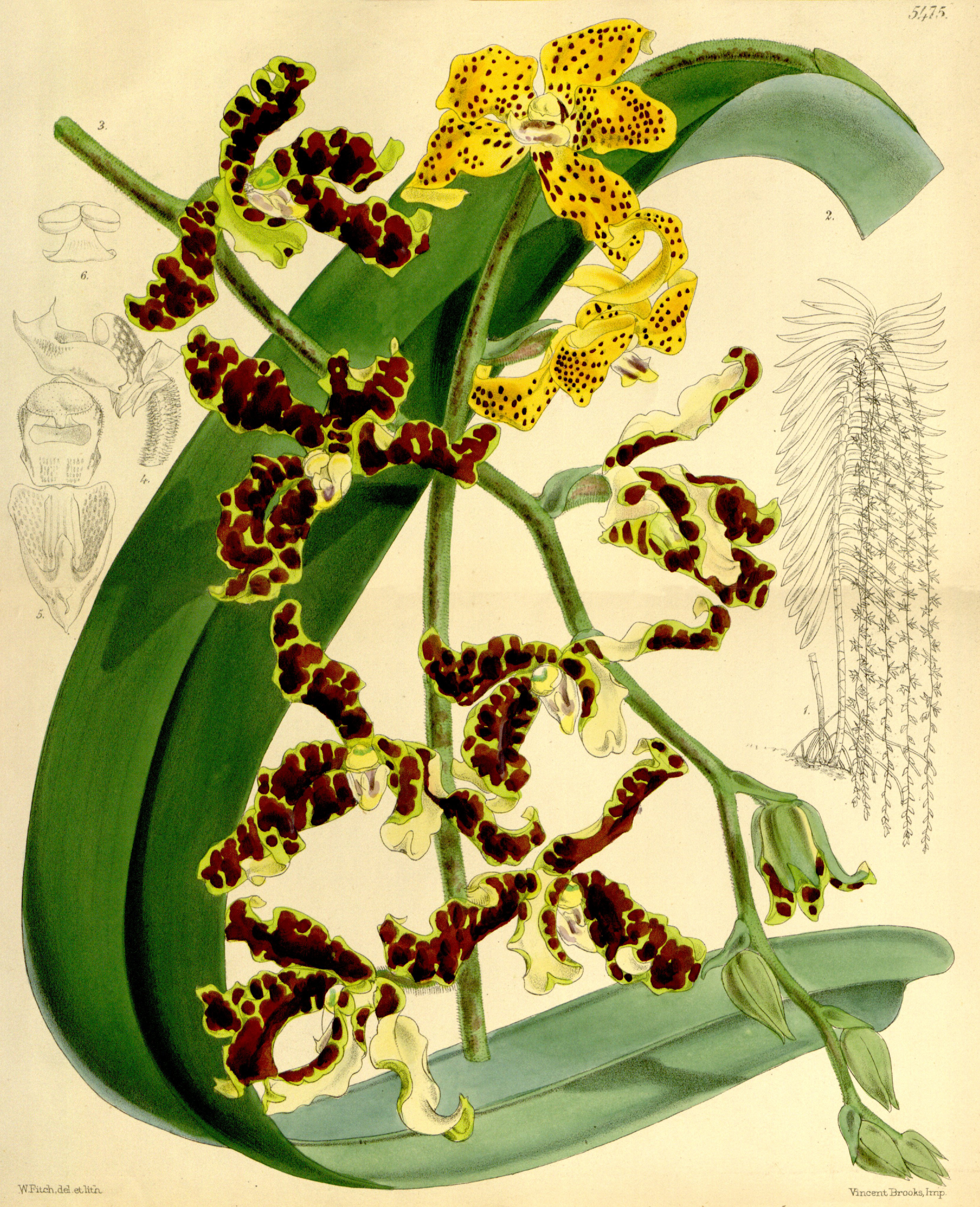
Botanical illustration of Dimorphorchis lowii by Walter Hood Fitch, 1864

Plants appear in art, either to illustrate their botanical appearance, or for the purposes of the artist, which may include decoration or symbolism, often religious. For example, the Virgin Mary was compared by the Venerable Bede to a lily, the white petals denoting purity of body, while the yellow anthers signified the radiant light of the soul; accordingly, European portraits of the Virgin's Annunciation may depict a vase of white lilies in her room to indicate her attributes. Plants are also often used as backgrounds or features in portraits, and as main subjects in still lifes.

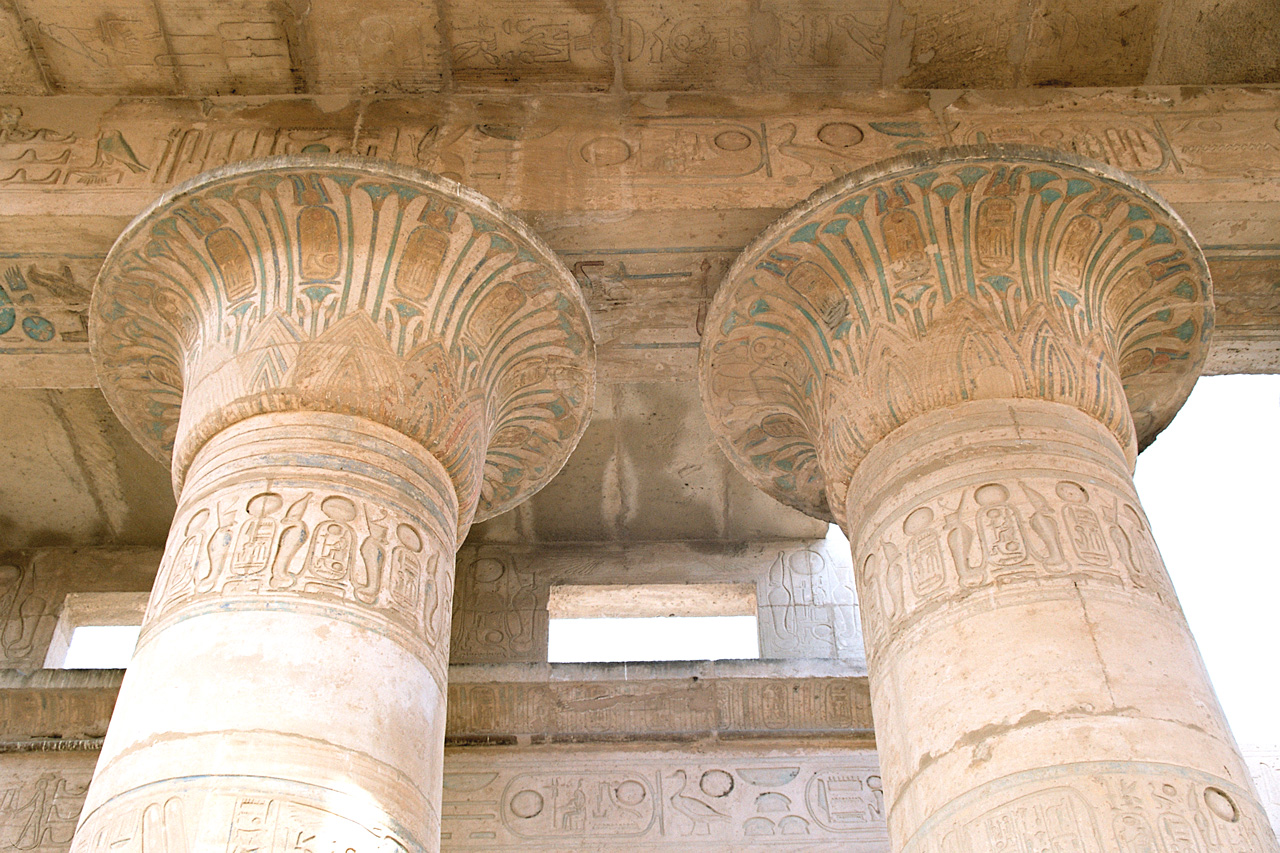
Capitals of ancient Egyptian columns decorated to resemble papyrus plants. Luxor, Egypt

Architectural designs resembling plants appear in the capitals of Ancient Egyptian columns, which were carved to resemble either the Egyptian white lotus or the papyrus. Ancient Greek columns of the Corinthian order are decorated with acanthus leaves. Islamic art, too, makes frequent use of plant motifs and patterns, including on column capitals. These designs became increasingly elaborate and stylised, appearing as complex arabesque and geometric motifs in objects such as the Ardabil Carpet and ten-pointed Persian ceramic star tiles, influencing the decorative arts in the Western world in such forms as the Rococo and later the Arts and Crafts movement.

=== In literature and film ===
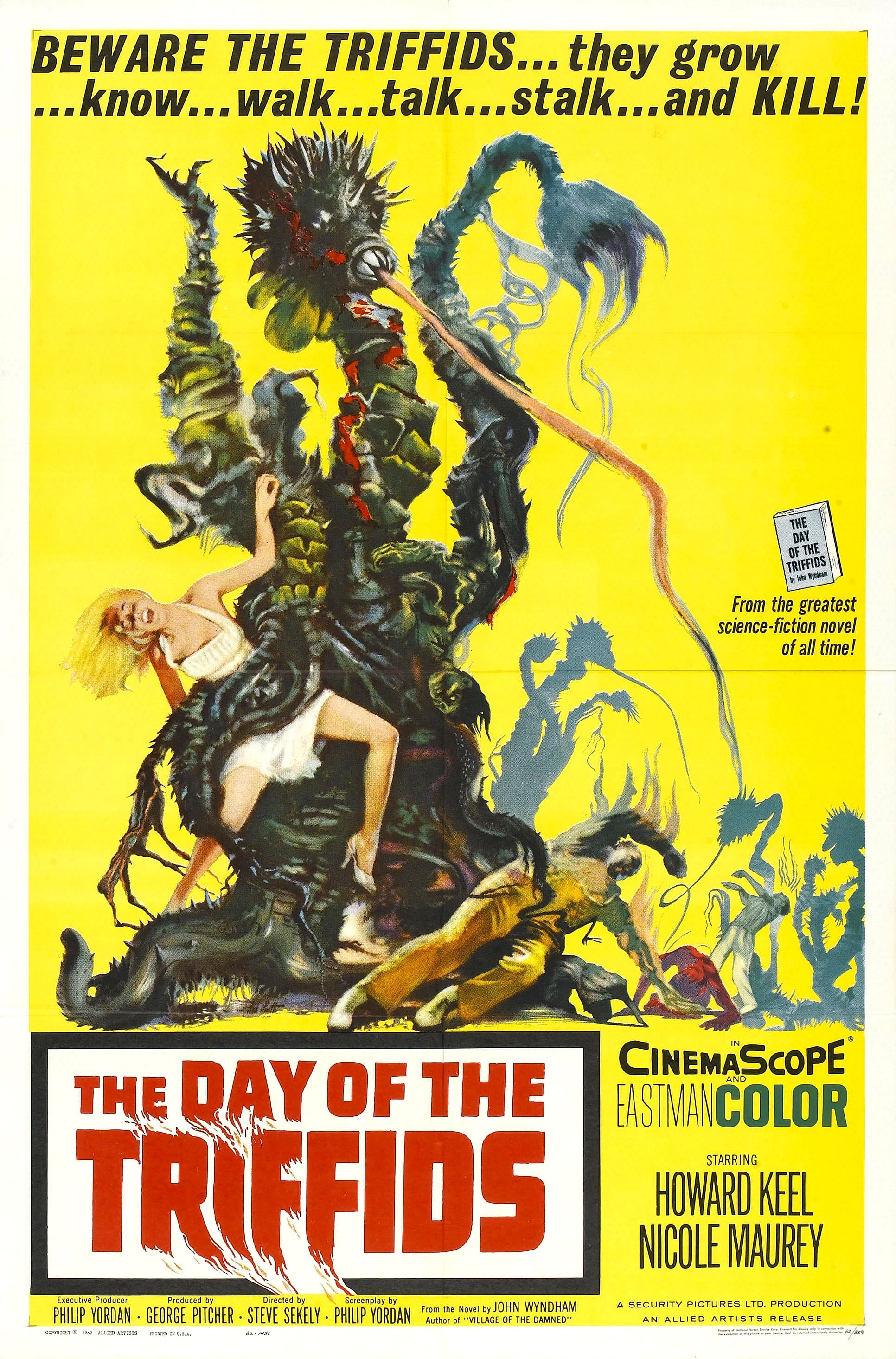
The 1962 film of John Wyndham's 1951 science fiction novel The Day of the Triffids depicted aggressive and seemingly intelligent plants.

Both real and fictitious plants play a wide variety of roles in literature and film. Plants' roles may be evil, as with the triffids, carnivorous plants with a whip-like poisonous sting as well as mobility provided by three foot-like appendages, from John Wyndham's 1951 science fiction novel The Day of the Triffids, and subsequent films and radio plays. J. R. R. Tolkien's Middle-earth makes use of many named kinds of plant, including the healing herb athelas the yellow star-flower elanor which grows in special places such as Cerin Amroth in Lothlórien, and the tall mallorn tree of the elves. Tolkien names several individual trees of significance in the narrative, including the Party Tree in the Shire with its happy associations, and the malevolent Old Man Willow in the Old Forest. Trees feature in many of Ursula K. Le Guin's books, including the forest world of Athshe and the Immanent Grove on Roke in the Earthsea series, to such an extent that in her introduction to her collection The Wind's Twelve Quarters, she admits to "a certain obsession with trees" and describes herself as "the most arboreal science fiction writer". James Cameron's 2009 film Avatar features a giant tree named Hometree, the sacred gathering place of the humanoid Na'vi tribe; the interconnected tree, tribe and planet are threatened by mining: the tribe and the film's hero fight to save them. Trees are common subjects in poetry, including Joyce Kilmer's 1913 lyric poem named "Trees". Flowers, similarly, are the subjects of many poems by poets such as William Blake, Robert Frost, and Rabindranath Tagore.

=== In mythology and religion ===
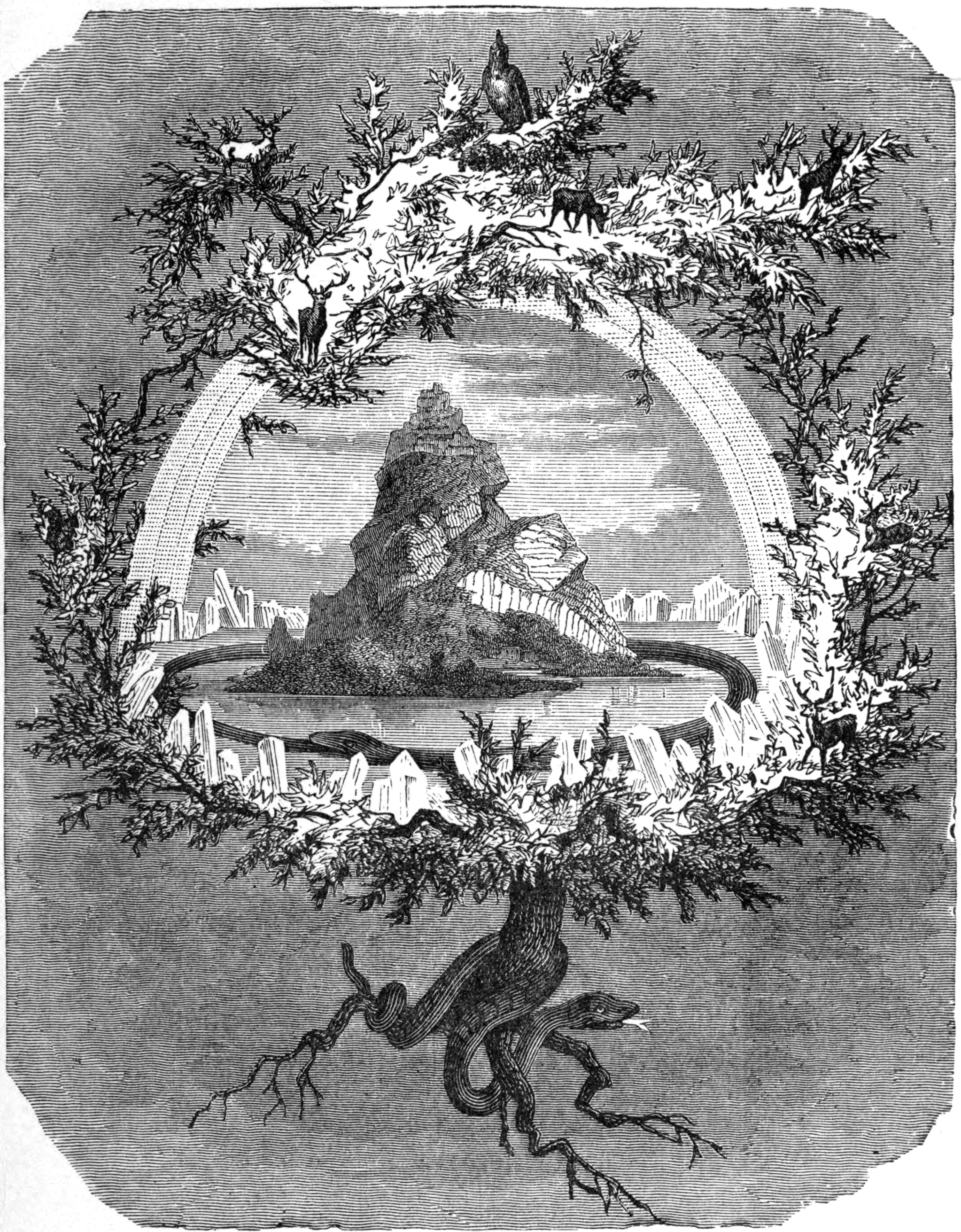
The Ash Yggdrasil, the World tree of Norse mythology, depicted by Friedrich Wilhelm Heine, 1886

Plants figure prominently in mythology and religion, where they symbolise themes such as fertility, growth, immortality and rebirth, and may be more or less magical. Thus in Latvian mythology, Austras koks is a tree which grows from the start of the Sun's daily journey across the sky. A different cosmic tree is Yggdrasil, the World tree of Norse mythology, on which Odin hung. Different again is the barnacle tree, believed in the Middle Ages to have barnacles that opened to reveal geese, a story which may perhaps have started from an observation of goose barnacles growing on driftwood. Greek mythology mentions many plants and flowers, where for example the lotus tree bears a fruit that causes a pleasant drowsiness, while moly is a magic herb mentioned by Homer in the Odyssey with a black root and white blossoms.

The mandrake is hallucinogenic and its roots can resemble a human figure, so it has long been used in magic. Tabernanthe iboga is used as a hallucinogenic in Gabon by secret societies for initiation ceremonies. Magic plants are found, too, in Serbian mythology, where the raskovnik is supposed to be able to open any lock. In Buddhist symbolism, both the lotus and the Bodhi Tree are significant. The lotus is one of the Ashtamangala (eight auspicious signs) shared between Buddhism, Jainism and Hinduism, representing the primordial purity of body, speech, and mind, floating above the muddy waters of attachment and desire. The Bodhi Tree is the sacred fig tree under which the Buddha is said to have attained enlightenment; the name is also given to other Bodhi trees thought to have been propagated from the original tree.

=== In beauty and fashion ===
For thousands of years, people have worn flowers, such as accessories in the hair, serving as a nonverbal communication. In ancient Greece and Rome, people wore flower crowns, garlands, and wreaths on many occasions, sometimes with artificial flowers.

From the 18th to the mid-20th centuries, a trade in artificial flowers for hats flourished in Paris. Firms such as Maison Légeron supplied the flowers to the fashion industry. From the 1920s, the French fashion designer Coco Chanel incorporated artificial flowers, especially camellias, into the clothes she designed, using the same fabric as the clothes. In 1920s Italy, it was fashionable for men to wear a boutonnière, a small floral arrangement on the lapel buttonhole; the scholar of fashion Alessandra Vaccari suggests that this made a statement about their sexuality.

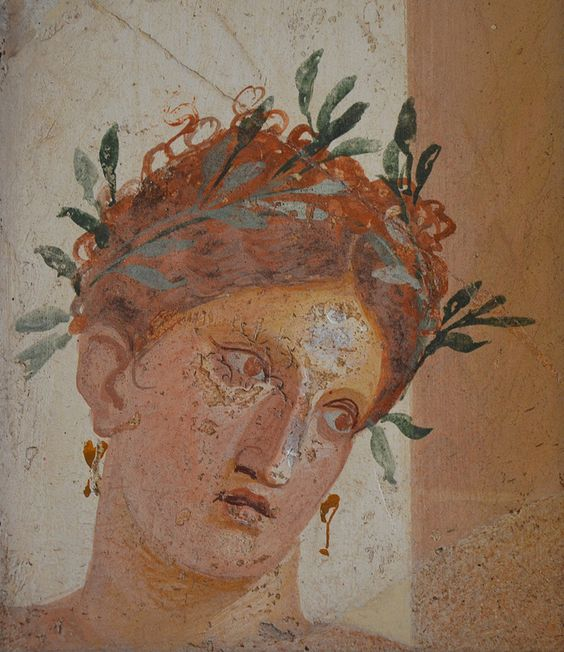
Roman fresco of a woman wearing a garland of olives, from Herculaneum

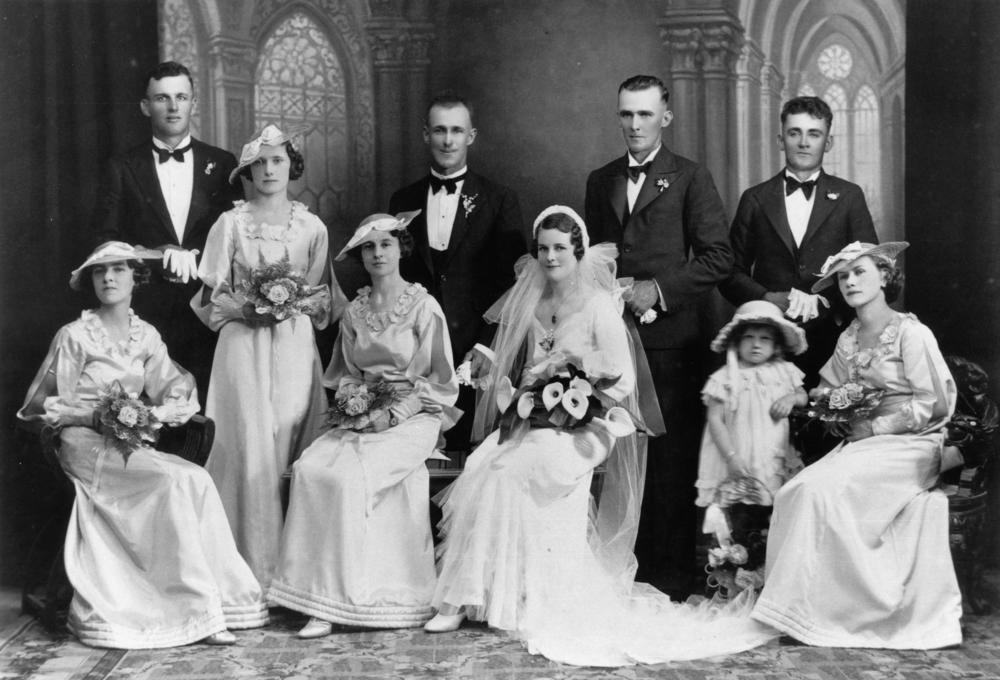
An Australian wedding party, 1930s. The men have floral buttonholes; the women wear garlands and carry bouquets.

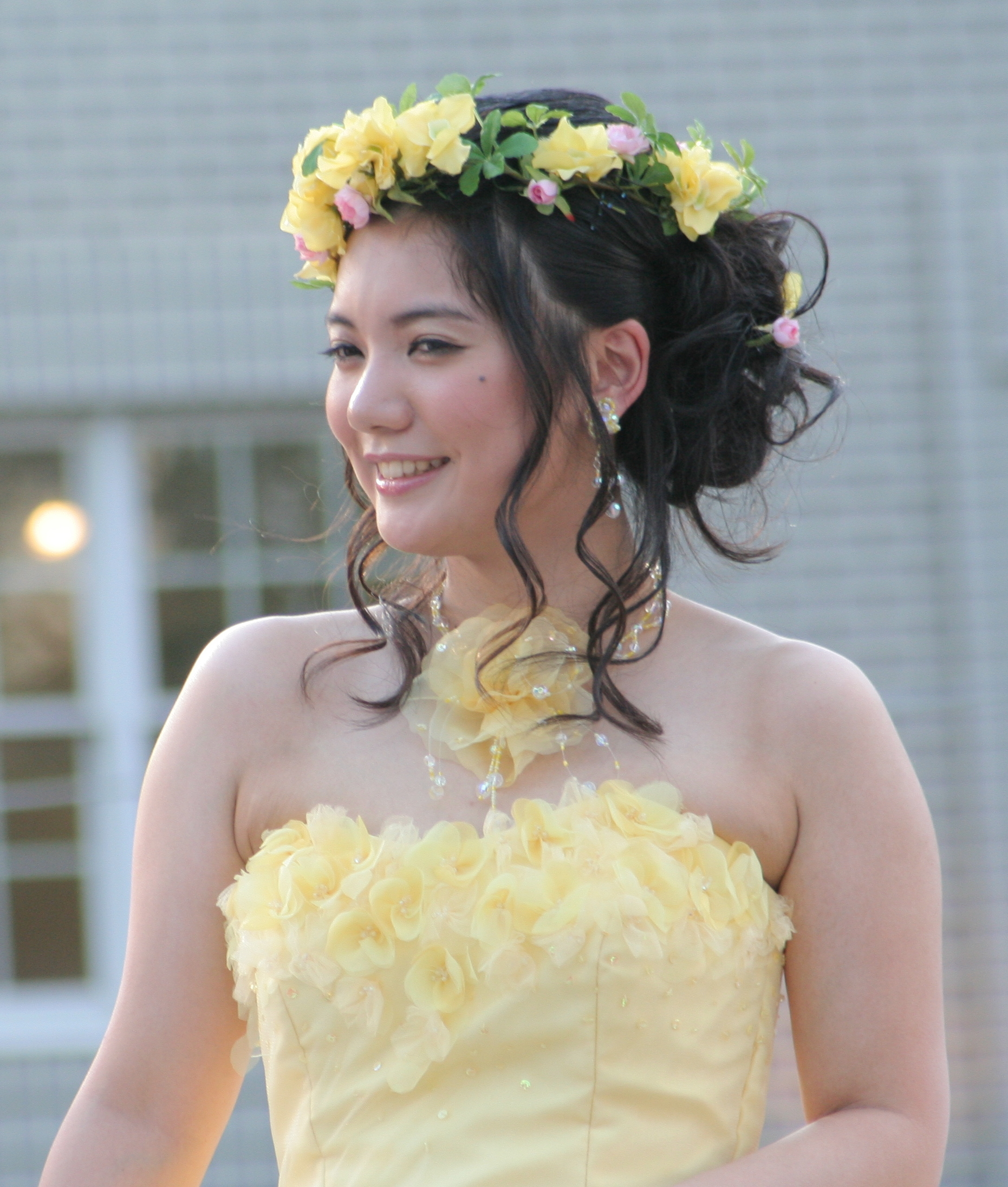
A woman wearing a flower crown at the Himeji Castle festival

== See also ==
- Floral emblem
- Plant epithet
