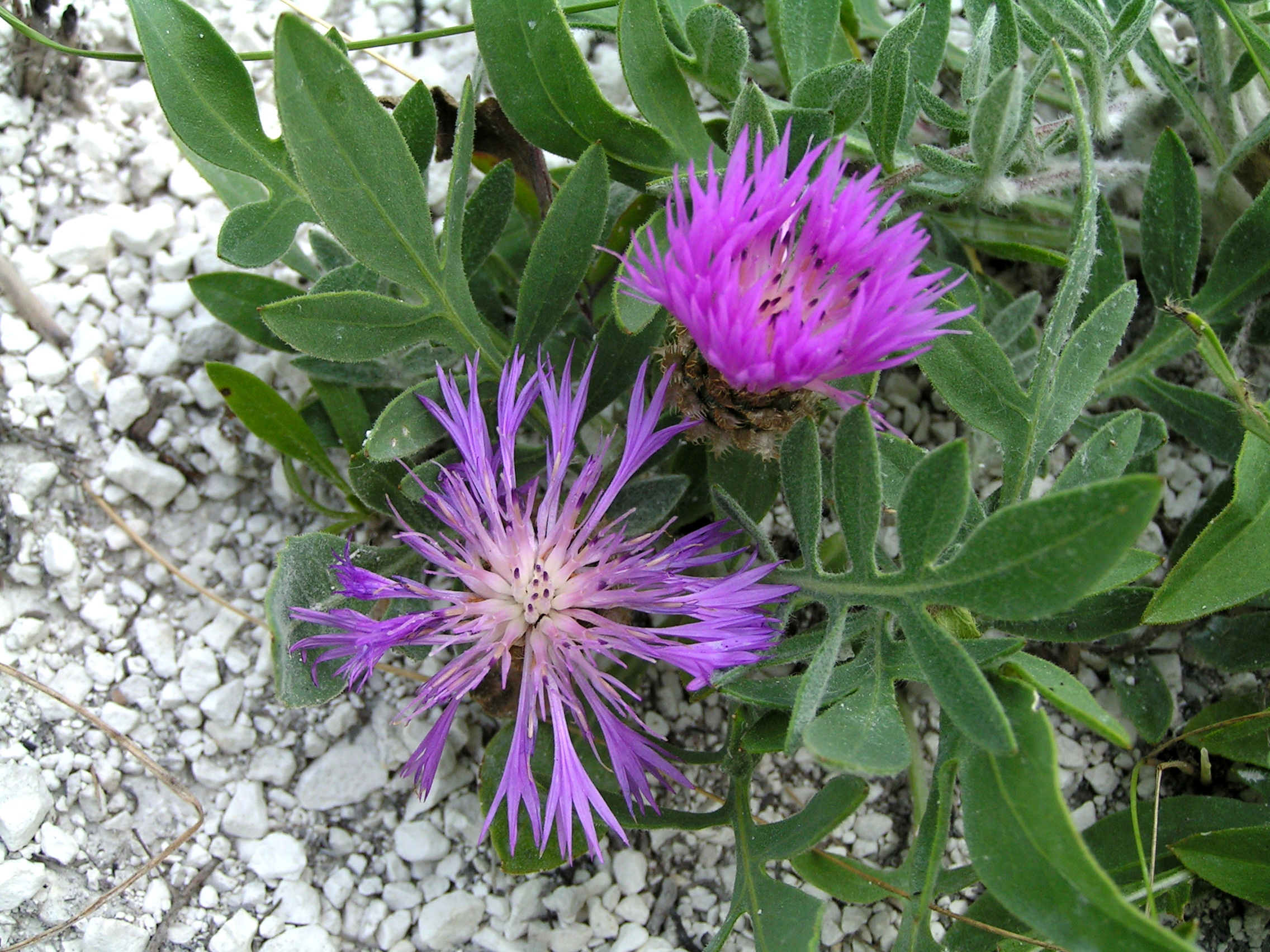
- Psephellus carbonatus, here given as Centaurea carbonata

Scientific classification
- Kingdom: Plantae
- Clade: Embryophytes
- Clade: Tracheophytes
- Clade: Spermatophytes
- Clade: Angiosperms
- Clade: Eudicots
- Clade: Asterids
- Order: Asterales
- Family: Asteraceae
- Subfamily: Carduoideae
- Tribe: Cardueae
- Subtribe: Centaureinae
- Genus: Psephellus; Cass.

Species
- See text

= Psephellus =

Genus of flowering plants

Psephellus is a genus of flowering plants in the tribe Cardueae within the family Asteraceae, native to eastern Europe and western Asia. A taxonomic revision reassigned many species from Centaurea to Psephellus.

== Species ==
Currently accepted species include:

- Psephellus abchasicus Albov
- Psephellus absinthifolius Galushko
- Psephellus adjaricus (Albov) Mikheev
- Psephellus albovii (Sosn.) Mikheev
- Psephellus alexeenkoi Alieva
- Psephellus amblyolepis (Ledeb.) Wagenitz
- Psephellus andinus Galushko & Alieva
- Psephellus annae Galushko
- Psephellus appendiciger (K.Koch) Wagenitz
- Psephellus araxinus (Gabrieljan) Greuter
- Psephellus arpensis (Czerep.) Wagenitz
- Psephellus atropatanus (Grossh.) Greuter
- Psephellus aucherianus (DC.) Boiss.
- Psephellus avaricus (Tzvelev) Wagenitz
- Psephellus bagadensis (Woronow) Greuter
- Psephellus barbeyi Albov
- Psephellus bellus (Trautv.) Wagenitz
- Psephellus boissieri Sosn.
- Psephellus bornmuelleri (Hausskn. ex Bornm.) Wagenitz
- Psephellus brevifimbriatus (Hub.-Mor.) Wagenitz
- Psephellus buschiorum Sosn.
- Psephellus carbonatus (Klokov) Greuter
- Psephellus carthalinicus Sosn.
- Psephellus caucasicus (Sosn.) Greuter
- Psephellus circassicus (Albov) Galushko
- Psephellus ciscaucasicus (Sosn.) Galushko
- Psephellus colchicus Sosn.
- Psephellus congestus (Wagenitz) Wagenitz
- Psephellus cronquistii (Takht. & Gabrieljan) Gabrieljan
- Psephellus czerepanovii Alieva
- Psephellus czirkejensis (Husseinov) Greuter
- Psephellus daghestanicus Sosn.
- Psephellus dealbatus K.Koch
- Psephellus debedicus (Gabrieljan) Gabrieljan
- Psephellus declinatus K.Koch
- Psephellus dimitriewae (Sosn.) Greuter
- Psephellus dittrichii (Gabrieljan) Gabrieljan
- Psephellus erivanensis Lipsky
- Psephellus erzincani Wagenitz & Kandemir
- Psephellus eugenii (Sosn.) Wagenitz
- Psephellus fajvuschii (Gabrieljan) Greuter
- Psephellus freynii Sint. ex Bornm.
- Psephellus galactochroa (Rech.f.) Parsa
- Psephellus galushkoi Alieva
- Psephellus gamidii Alieva
- Psephellus geghamensis (Gabrieljan) Gabrieljan
- Psephellus gilanicus (Bornm.) Wagenitz
- Psephellus goeksunensis (Aytaç & H.Duman) Greuter & Raab-Straube
- Psephellus gracillimus (Wagenitz) Wagenitz
- Psephellus hadimensis (Wagenitz, Ertugrul & Dural) Wagenitz
- Psephellus holophyllus (Soczava & Lipatova) Greuter
- Psephellus holtzii (Wagenitz) Wagenitz
- Psephellus huber-morathii (Wagenitz) Wagenitz
- Psephellus hymenolepis
- Psephellus hypoleucus Boiss.
- Psephellus iljinii (Czerniak.) Wagenitz
- Psephellus incanescens Boiss.
- Psephellus integrifolius K.Koch
- Psephellus karabaghensis Sosn.
- Psephellus karduchorum (Boiss.) Wagenitz
- Psephellus kemulariae Kharadze
- Psephellus khalkhalensis Ranjbar & Negaresh
- Psephellus kobstanicus (Tzvelev) Wagenitz
- Psephellus kolakovskyi (Sosn.) Greuter
- Psephellus kopet-daghensis (Iljin) Wagenitz
- Psephellus leucophyllus C.A.Mey.
- Psephellus leuzeoides (Jaub. & Spach) Wagenitz
- Psephellus maleevii Sosn.
- Psephellus manakyanii (Gabrieljan) Gabrieljan
- Psephellus marschallianus (Spreng.) K.Koch
- Psephellus meskheticus (Sosn.) Gabrieljan
- Psephellus mucroniferus (DC.) Wagenitz
- Psephellus oltensis Wagenitz
- Psephellus pambakensis Sosn.
- Psephellus paucilobus Boiss.
- Psephellus pecho (Albov) Wagenitz
- Psephellus pergamaceus (DC.) Wagenitz
- Psephellus phaeopappoides (Bordz.) Wagenitz
- Psephellus poluninii (Wagenitz) Wagenitz
- Psephellus popovae (Gabrieljan) Gabrieljan
- Psephellus prokhanovii Galushko
- Psephellus psephelloides (Freyn & Sint.) Wagenitz
- Psephellus pseudoandinus Galushko & Alieva
- Psephellus pulcherrimus (Willd.) Wagenitz
- Psephellus pyrroblepharus (Boiss.) Wagenitz
- Psephellus recepii Wagenitz & Kandemir
- Psephellus ruprechtii (Boiss.) Greuter
- Psephellus salviifolius Boiss.
- Psephellus schischkinii (Tzvelev) Wagenitz
- Psephellus schistosus (Sosn.) Alieva
- Psephellus sergii (Klokov) A.L.Ebel
- Psephellus sibiricus (L.) Wagenitz
- Psephellus simplicicaulis (Boiss. & A.Huet) Wagenitz
- Psephellus somcheticus Sosn.
- Psephellus straminicephalus (Hub.-Mor.) Wagenitz
- Psephellus sumensis (Kalen.) Greuter
- Psephellus taochius Sosn.
- Psephellus transcaucasicus Sosn.
- Psephellus trinervius (Willd.) Wagenitz
- Psephellus troitzkii Sosn.
- Psephellus turcicus A.Duran & Hamzaoglu
- Psephellus turgaicus (Klokov) A.L.Ebel
- Psephellus vanensis A.Duran, Behçet & B.Dogan
- Psephellus vvedenskii Sosn.
- Psephellus woronowii Sosn.
- Psephellus xanthocephalus Fisch. & C.A.Mey. ex Boiss.
- Psephellus xeranthemoides (Rech.f.) Wagenitz
- Psephellus yildizii (Civelek, Türkoglu & Akan) Greuter
- Psephellus yusufeliensis Tugay & Uysal
- Psephellus zangezuri Sosn.
- Psephellus zuvandicus Sosn.
