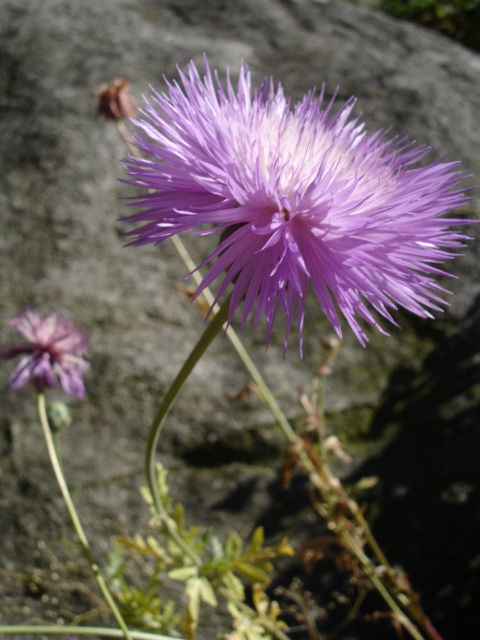
- Amberboa moschata

Scientific classification
- Kingdom: Plantae
- Clade: Tracheophytes
- Clade: Angiosperms
- Clade: Eudicots
- Clade: Asterids
- Order: Asterales
- Family: Asteraceae
- Subfamily: Carduoideae
- Tribe: Cardueae
- Subtribe: Centaureinae
- Genus: Amberboa (Pers.) Less.

Type species
- Amberboa moschata (Linnaeus) A. P. de Candolle

Synonyms
- List: Amberboa Vaill.; Amberboia Kuntze; Centaurea subg. Amberboa Pers.; Chryseis Cass.

= Amberboa =

Genus of flowering plants

Amberboa is a genus of flowering plants in the tribe Cardueae within the family Asteraceae, described as a genus in 1832.

Species in this genus are native to central and southwestern Asia.

Species

- Amberboa amberboi (L.) Tzvelev - Turkmenistan, Kazakhstan, Uzbekistan, Iran, Armenia
- Amberboa bucharica Iljin - Turkmenistan, Kazakhstan, Uzbekistan, Tajikistan, Kyrgyzstan, Afghanistan, Iran
- Amberboa glauca (Puschk. ex Willd.) Muss.Puschk. ex Grossh. - Caucasus, Iran, Turkey
- Amberboa moschata (L.) DC. - Caucasus, Turkey, Iran, Iraq
- Amberboa nana (Boiss.) Iljin - Altai, Caucasus, Turkey, Iran, Iraq, Lebanon, Syria, Kazakhstan
- Amberboa odorata (Cass.) DC.
- Amberboa ramosa (Roxb.) Jafri - India, Pakistan, Afghanistan
- Amberboa sosnovskyi Iljin - Caucasus, Iran
- Amberboa turanica Iljin - Russia, Caucasus, Iran, Central Asia, Xinjiang, Pakistan, Afghanistan
