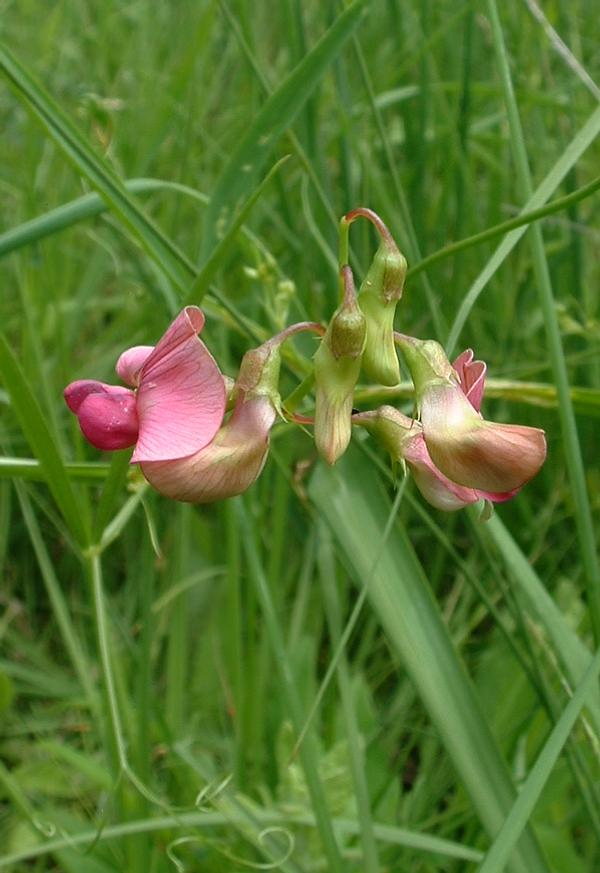

Conservation status
- Least Concern (IUCN 3.1)

Scientific classification
- Kingdom: Plantae
- Clade: Tracheophytes
- Clade: Angiosperms
- Clade: Eudicots
- Clade: Rosids
- Order: Fabales
- Family: Fabaceae
- Subfamily: Faboideae
- Genus: Lathyrus
- Species: L. sylvestris

Binomial name
- Lathyrus sylvestris L.

Synonyms
- List: Lathyrus angustifolius Medik. (1787); Lathyrus grandiflorus Láng (1824); Lathyrus heterophyllus Lapeyr. (1813); Lathyrus intermedius Wallr. (1822); Lathyrus noeanus Alef. (1861); Lathyrus platyphyllos (Retz.) W.D.J.Koch (1843); Lathyrus pyrenaicus Jord. (1848); Lathyrus variegatus Gilib. (1782)

= Lathyrus sylvestris =

Plant species in the pea family

Lathyrus sylvestris, the flat pea or narrow-leaved everlasting-pea, is a species of flowering plant in the pea and bean family Fabaceae. It is native to parts of Africa, Europe, and Asia.

The narrow-leaved everlasting-pea forms a mat of herbage. The stems are winged. Each leaf is made up of two elongated leaflets. The flowers are pink. The fruit is a legume pod about 2 inches (5 cm) long.

== Description ==
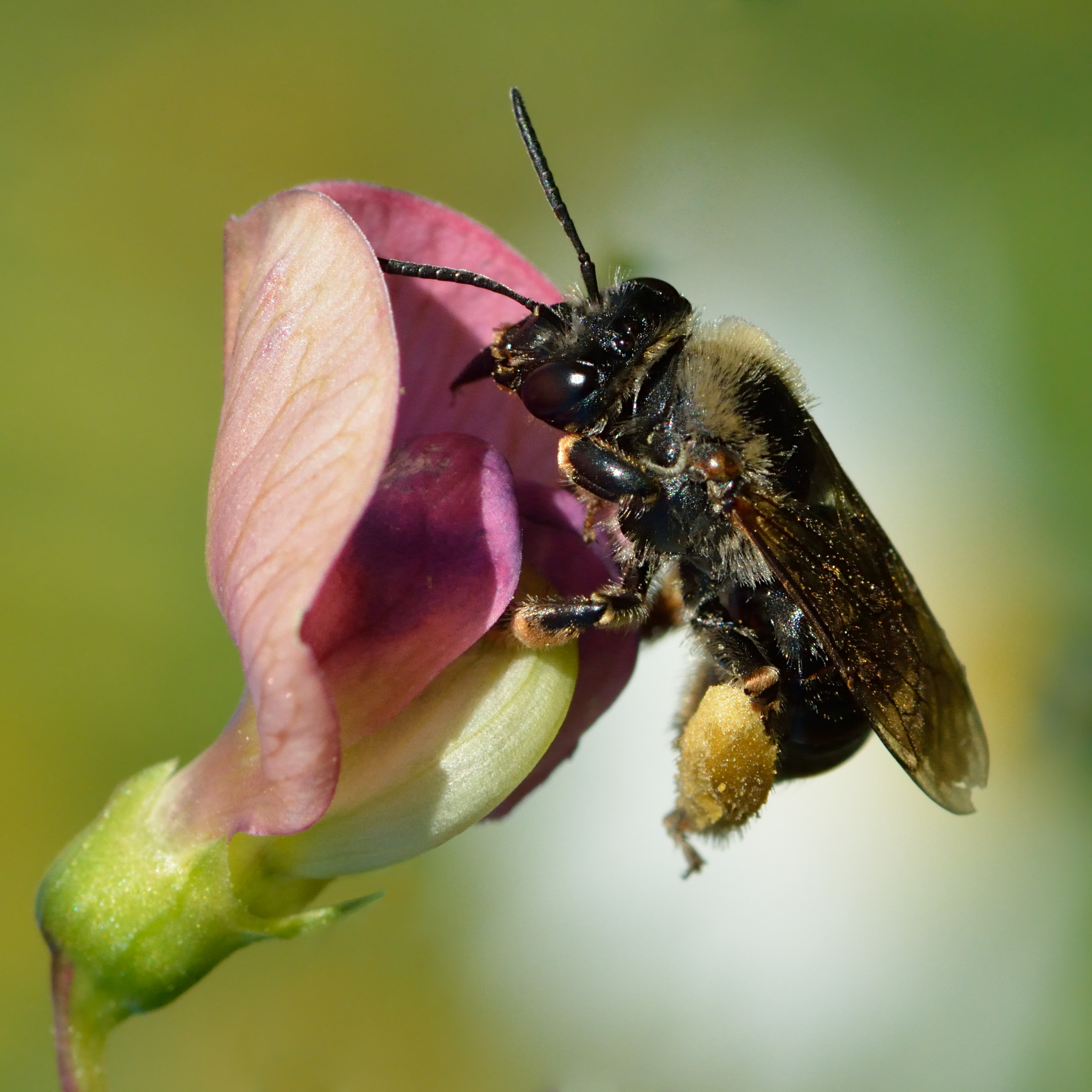
Pollination by long-horned bee

The narrow-leaved everlasting-pea is a perennial plant which can grow 200 cm (79 in) by climbing with its tendrils. Without any support it can reach about 75 cm (30 in) tall. The stem is floppy and flat with wide wings. The leaves are alternate with short winged stalks and stipules. The leaf blades are pinnate with a single pair of narrow lanceolate leaflets with entire margins and three tendrils. The inflorescence has a long stem and three to ten pinkish-red flowers. These have five sepals and five petals and are irregular. The uppermost petal is known as the "standard", the lateral two as the "wings" and the lowest two are joined to form the "keel". There are ten stamens and a single carpel. The fruit is a long pod containing five to fifteen seeds.

== Distribution and habitat ==
The narrow-leaved everlasting-pea is native to parts of Africa, Europe and Asia. Its natural habitat is forest edges, sparse broad-leaved hillside forests, dry hillside meadows, hedgerows, embankments and waste ground. It uses its tendrils to scramble over plants, shrubs and the lower branches of trees.

== Uses ==
This plant is sometimes used to control erosion and for this purpose it is generally planted along with a grass species. It can do well in highly disturbed habitat. There is a cultivar called 'Lathco'.
