= Dragonwort =

Dragonwort is a common name for a plant which may refer to:

- Artemisia dracunculus, also known as tarragon, an edible aromatic herb in the daisy family, Asteraceae
- Dracunculus vulgaris, also known as dragon arum, a flowering plant in the arum family, Araceae
- Persicaria bistorta, also known as bistort, a plant in the knotweed family, Polygonaceae, once classified as Polygonum bistorta.
- Arisaema dracontium, also known as green dragon, a herbaceous perennial native to North America. Dracontium meant "dragonwort" in classical Latin.
