= Mountain pink =

Mountain pink is a common name for several plants and may refer to:

- Dianthus armeria, native to Europe;
- Zeltnera beyrichii, native to the Americas.
