= Goat's rue =

Goat's rue may refer to:

- Galega officinalis
- Tephrosia lindheimeri
- Tephrosia virginiana, native to the United States
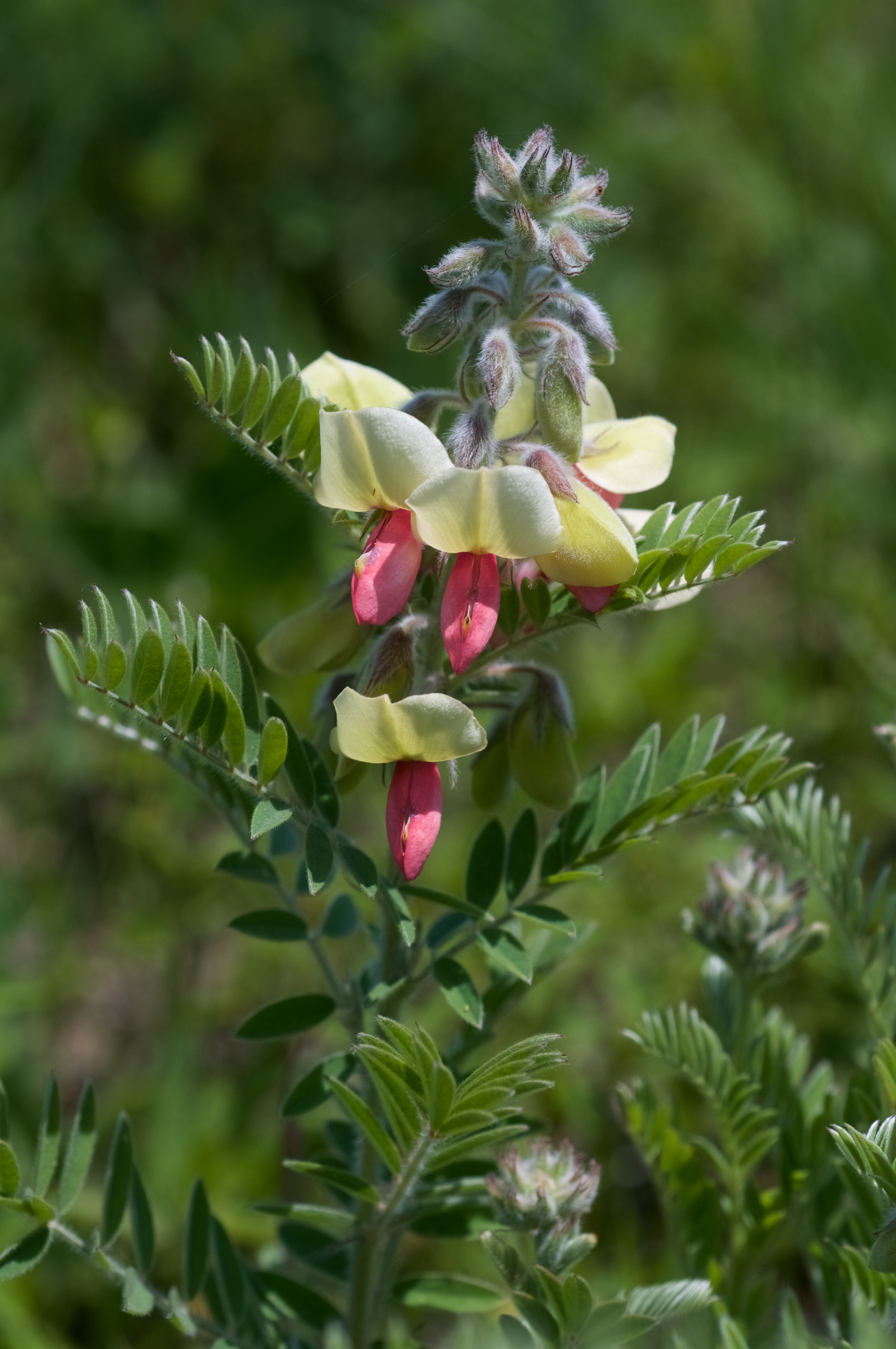
Tephrosia virginiana

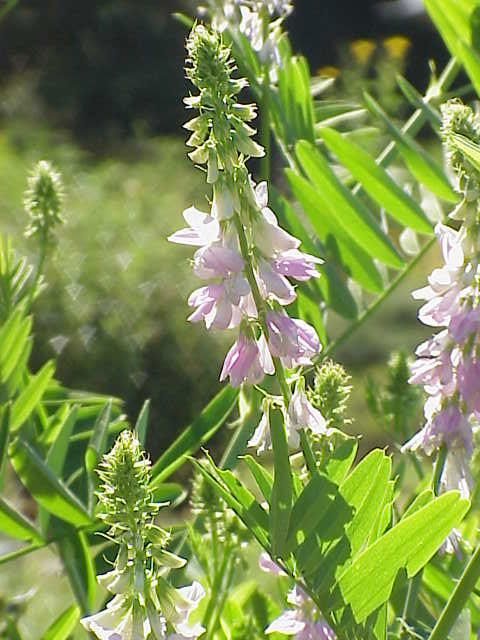
Galega officinalis
