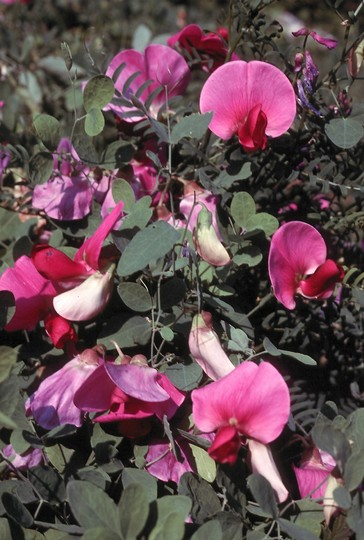

Conservation status
- Least Concern (IUCN 3.1)

Scientific classification
- Kingdom: Plantae
- Clade: Tracheophytes
- Clade: Angiosperms
- Clade: Eudicots
- Clade: Rosids
- Order: Fabales
- Family: Fabaceae
- Subfamily: Faboideae
- Genus: Lathyrus
- Species: L. grandiflorus

Binomial name
- Lathyrus grandiflorus Sibth. & Sm.

= Lathyrus grandiflorus =

Species of flowering plant in the bean family Fabaceae

Lathyrus grandiflorus, two-flowered everlasting pea, is a species of flowering plant in the family Fabaceae, native to southern Europe. Growing to 2 m (6.6 ft) tall, it is a twining herbaceous perennial with grey-green leaves and, in late summer, bright magenta-pink flowers, the central keel a darker red. Unlike its cousin, the annual sweet pea (Lathyrus odoratus), it is unscented. Once established it is a robust plant with the ability to scramble into other shrubs and trees. It is very hardy, down to −20 °C (−4 °F), so is capable of surviving conditions in most temperate regions of the world.

In the UK it has gained the Royal Horticultural Society's Award of Garden Merit.
