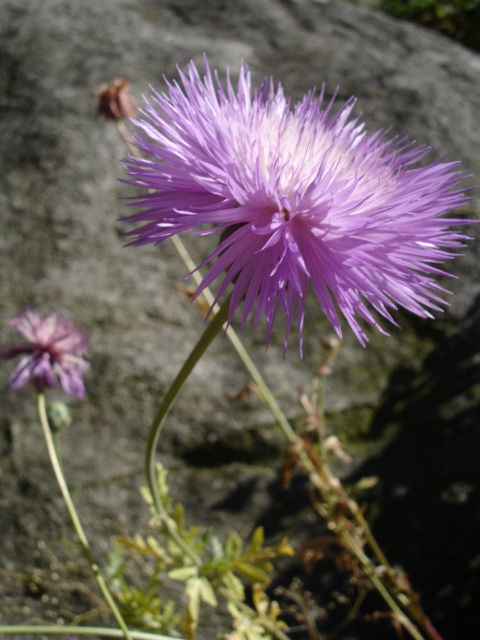

Scientific classification
- Kingdom: Plantae
- Clade: Tracheophytes
- Clade: Angiosperms
- Clade: Eudicots
- Clade: Asterids
- Order: Asterales
- Family: Asteraceae
- Genus: Amberboa
- Species: A. moschata

Binomial name
- Amberboa moschata (L.) DC.

Synonyms
- Centaurea moschata L.; Centaurium moschatum (L.) Cass.; Centaurium suaveolens Cass.; Chryseis moschata (L.) Cass.; Cyanus luteus Moench; Cyanus moschatus (L.) Gaertn.

= Amberboa moschata =

Species of flowering plant

Amberboa moschata (common name sweetsultan) is a Southwest Asian species of plants in the family Asteraceae. It is native to Armenia, Turkey, Iraq, Iran, and the Caucasus. It is also widely cultivated in many places as an ornamental, and is reportedly naturalized in parts of China and North America.

Amberboa moschata is a branching herb up to 50 cm tall. Flower heads are usually purple, showy, and sweet-scented.
