= FCL =

FCL may refer to:

== Computing ==
- Flow chart language
- Framework Class Library, a .NET library
- Free Component Library, a Pascal library
- Fuzzy Control Language

== Sport ==
- 1. FC Lichtenfels, a German football club
- FC Lorient, a French football club
- FC Luzern, a Swiss football club
- FC Lootos Põlva (women) or FCL Lootos, an Estonian football club
- Florida Complex League, a US-based rookie league in professional baseball

== Transport ==
- Ferrocarril de Langreo, a defunct Spanish railway
- Florida Coastal Airlines, a defunct American airline
- Flying Colours Airlines, a defunct British airline
- Full container load

== Other uses ==
- Christopher Columbus Foundation or Fondazione Cristoforo Colombo per le Libertà, a political party in Italy
- Faculdade Cásper Líbero, a Brazilian journalism school
- Fault current limiter
- Federated Co-operatives Limited, a Canadian retail co-operative federation
- First Colony Life Insurance Company, a defunct American insurer
- FishCenter Live, an American television series
- Foundation Coal Holdings, an American coal mining company
- Free convective layer
- Fundação Cásper Líbero, Brazilian media company

== See also ==
- JAR-FCL (Pilot License), Joint Aviation Requirements Flight Crew License
