= Jovem Pan (TV network) =

Brazilian television network

- Type: Free-to-air television network
- Country: Brazil
- Headquarters: Santa Inês, Maranhão, Brazil (main station); São Paulo, Brazil (studios)

Programming
- Language: Portuguese
- Picture format: 1080i HDTV (downgraded to 480i for the SD feed)

Ownership
- Owner: Grupo Jovem Pan; Patati Patatá
- Key people: Rinaldi Faria

History
- Founded: 26 January 2026; 6 months ago

Links
- Website: www.jovempan.com.br

Availability

Terrestrial
- Digital terrestrial television: 19 UHF (Santa Inês)

Jovem Pan is a Brazilian over-the-air television network based in São Paulo, owned by Grupo Jovem Pan, which launched on 26 January 2026. The network’s signal originates from Jovem Pan Santa Inês, in Santa Inês, Maranhão, and it is the group’s second over-the-air television venture after TV Jovem Pan, which operated in Greater São Paulo between 1991 and 1995.

== History ==
=== Jovem Pan's previous over-the-air television attempts ===
Jovem Pan's first television investment happened in September 1991, with the launch of TV Jovem Pan on UHF channel 16 in São Paulo. Divergences between staff members and financial difficulties, however, caused the station's downfall, which was even the target of a CPI to investigate supposed irregularities in its forming. In July 1995, nearly two years after Jovem Pan left the corporate structure, the station shut down and was taken over by Canal Brasileiro da Informação.

In 2021, Grupo Jovem Pan negotiated the acquisition of the license of channel 32 in São Paulo, where Loading, owned by Grupo Kalunga, used to air. The agreement, however, did not happen due to judicial action that threatened to shut down the license due to irregularities in the transfer of the channel from Grupo Abril to Spring Televisão S.A. in 2013.

On October 6, 2025, after six years operating as an independent station, Rede Cidade Verde announced a partnership with TV Jovem Pan News, the group's pay-TV news channel. With that, the regional network's owned-and-operated and affiliate stations started relaying the programming of the news channel, as well as producing some projects together. The change marked the return of a Grupo Jovem Pan asset to over-the-air television after thirty years.

=== Launch as an over-the-air television network ===
On January 1, 2026, Grupo Jovem Pan announced a partnership with Rede Mais Família Santa Inês, station owned by businessman Rinaldi Faria, to generate the schedule of the conglomerate's new OTA television network from January 7. With the agreement, the Jovem Pan network also gained Mais Família's relay stations in São Paulo (channel 19.1, physical UHF 51) and in Campinas (physical UHF 41), both owned by Rinaldi.

On January 6, one day ahead of launch, Grupo Jovem Pan announced the delay of the project. According to the TV Pop portal, the main reason was the group preferring UHF channel 36 in São Paulo, the real relay of the Santa Inês generating station, since channel 19.1 (offered to the network by Rinaldi) suffered interference from TV Diário, TV Globo's affiliate in Mogi das Cruzes, in most of the São Paulo capital area. The group, in its turn, informed through Jornal Jovem Pan, on TV Jovem Pan News, that the network was "briefly delayed" due to technical adjustments to improve the delivery of the signal.

On January 16, Grupo Jovem Pan vice-president Marcelo Carvalho, informed through his LinkedIn account that the network would start the following day, this time relayed on channel 51.1 in São Paulo, with the remaining channels being unaltered, as well as confirming the affiliation of Rede Cidade Verde's stations to the new. The channel started broadcasting at midnight on the early hours of January 17 with a repeat of Pânico already in progress. According to the group, the network's launch was in a test phase, with the official launch scheduled for January 26.

On launch day, several Grupo Jovem Pan programs had changes, such as Pânico, which got a new studio, and Jornal da Manhã gained two editions, longer length and new graphics. Morning Show, in its turn, gained a new presenter, marking the return of Fernando Rocha to over-the-air television after seven years.

On February 4, it was announced that TV São Luís would cease its RedeTV! affiliation after 22 years, moving to Jovem Pan within a maximum period of ninety days. With that, São Luís will become the second state capital to receive the network, after Cuiabá. On March 16, Araguaína's TV Líder left RedeTV! and joined Jovem Pan. On March 20, 2026, seven months after losing its TV Globo affiliation, TV Fronteira Paulista of Presidente Prudente, officially informed its social media profiles that it began carrying the network. The affiliation started after Fronteira Notícias 2ª Edição, with the airing of Jornal Jovem Pan.

On June 26, 2026, Jovem Pan announced the hiring of lawyer and professor André Marsiglia as a commentator for its political program Os Pingos nos Is. He began appearing on the program on July 13, 2026. On July 27, 2026, as part of its efforts to consolidate its presence on free-to-air television, Jovem Pan entered talks with television host Catia Fonseca to develop a weekday afternoon variety and service programme for its open TV schedule, reportedly targeting a 3 p.m. to 5 p.m. slot that would mirror the format she had previously presented on Record, TV Gazeta and Band. According to Brazilian entertainment news outlets, the project was discussed in meetings between the presenter and Jovem Pan executives, but no final format or premiere date had been officially announced at the time, and the negotiations were still ongoing.
