= Michelle Giannella =

Brazilian journalist

- Born: June 21, 1979 (age 47); São Paulo, Brazil
- Occupations: journalist, lawyer and television presenter
- Children: 3

Michelle Filomena Giannella, better known as Michelle Giannella (born June 21, 1979), is a Brazilian journalist, lawyer and television presenter. She has also worked as a model and has a law degree.

Michelle currently presents the program Gazeta Esportiva for TV Gazeta, is Osmar Garraffa's assistant at Mesa Redonda, and presents the award Troféu Mesa Redonda.

== Biography and career ==
Graduated in Journalism from Faculdade de Comunicação Social Cásper Líbero, Michelle began her career as an intern at TV Gazeta, on the extinct Gazeta Meio-Dia (debate program), for nine months. Afterwards, she worked at the newspaper A Gazeta Esportiva.

In 1999, she returned to TV Gazeta and joined the team of the programs Mulheres and Giro do Guerreiro. Michelle went on to do outside reporting for Mulheres, covering various events.

In December 2000, Michelle started presenting Gazeta Esportiva. In 2003, she started to participate in the Mesa Redonda program.

On the Internet, she was the editor of the Virgulando website and the Virgula portal, where she coordinated the culture and entertainment area. She was also editor-in-chief of the Estrelando website, hosted on the R7 portal.

In August 2015, she became the executive editor of the website Gazeta Esportiva.net.

In 2020, with the COVID-19 pandemic and the stoppage of sporting events, she presented the Plantão da Saúde program from March to July.

In 2021, she became part of the faculty of the graduate course in Sports Journalism at Faculdade Cásper Líbero.

== Personal life ==
Michelle has been married to engineer Bruno Vasconcellos since 2011. From this relationship, on June 24, 2013, Bruno, their first child, was born. In 2015, another pregnancy, now with the twins Laura and Leonardo.

She is a fan of Juventus.
