= Jovem Pan (Santa Inês) =

Brazilian television station

Coordinates: 3°39′50.1″S 45°23′20.4″W

Jovem Pan Santa Inês (ZYP 144)
- Santa Inês, Maranhão; Brazil
- Channels: Digital: 19 (UHF); Virtual: 19

Programming
- Language: Portuguese
- Affiliations: Jovem Pan (TV network)

Ownership
- Owner: Grupo Patati Patatá Grupo Jovem Pan; (Rádio Eldorado Ltda.)

History
- First air date: 1990; 36 years ago
- Former call signs: ZYA 654 (1990–2017)
- Former names: TV Maranhão Central (1990–2002); TV Eldorado (2002–2020); Rede Mais Família Santa Inês (2020–2026)
- Former affiliations: SBT (1990–1999); Rede Globo (1999–2002); TV Cultura (2002–2006); TV Aparecida (2006–2010); Esporte Interactivo (2010–2018); Rede Mais Família (2020–2026)

Technical information
- Licensing authority: ANATEL

Links
- Public license information: Profile

Jovem Pan Santa Inês (channel 19) is a Jovem Pan-affiliated Brazilian television network headquartered in Santa Inês, Maranhão. The network is owned by Grupo Patati Patatá his partner from Grupo Jovem Pan and generates its programming studios in São Paulo, where it is carried on channel 51.

== History ==
The license of the current Rede Mais Família came from the former TV Itapicuru Ltda. (by Decree n.º 96.809, of September 28, 1988) which was transferred to TV Maranhão Central Ltda. (by a decree on February 9, 1998, published on Diário Oficial da União the following day), both of which relaying Rede Globo.

In 1999, Grupo Mirante bought TV Maranhão Central from the family of businessman and politician Nagib Haickel. After that, TV became a Globo affiliate, ending its relays of SBT, which was now relayed by TV União dos Vales.

In December 2001, the station was acquired by Grupo Estado, changing its legal name to Rádio Eldorado Ltda, and on January 4, 2002, the station's name changed to TV Eldorado, becoming an affiliate of TV Cultura, its first in Maranhão. The group had the plan to turn the station in a national network in a two-year deadline, with its signal generating from Maranhão.

On May 9, 2002, it received authorization from the Ministry of Communications to operate as a relay station on UHF channel 36 in São Paulo. However, with the arrival of 2003, year in which it had plans to become a national network, this did not achieve, although it achieved more audience in Santa Inês during the morning.

In 2006, it traded TV Cultura for TV Aparecida, becoming the first affiliate of the recently created Catholic network. The channel had good ratings on Sunday mornings, since it relayed the mass services from the Basilica of Our Lady of Aparecida.

In 2008, TV Eldorado introduced its news program Em Dia Com a Cidade, which was produced from its studio and aimed mainly at news from Santa Inês.

On June 10, 2010, it left TV Aparecida and joined Esporte Interativo, a channel that had previously been limited to subscription television and other channels. Initially, it was informed that Esporte Interativo acquired the station, but it was later revealed that the affiliation was a lease.

On March 15, 2017, fourteen days before the analog shutdown in greater São Paulo (March 29), TV Eldorado started its digital broadcasts on UHF channel 36, shutting down its analog signal. The following day (March 16), it started its digital broadcasts on UHF channel 19 in Santa Inês as a generator, becoming the first digital station in the city and the region.

On August 9, 2018, Turner (owner of Esporte Interativo BR and subscription channels EI 1 and EI 2) announced that the channels would shut down in 40 days, alleging damage to their sports broadcasts that would be transferred to TNT and Space (both from Turner) as well as continuing with its apps. The announcement took viewers by surprise and the programming of the three channels began to consist of reruns of old programs at 11 am, until their closure on September 25. However, despite the closure of EI BR both on over-the-air and subscription television, TV Eldorado continued showing the defunct channel's programming with local programming direct from Maranhão, leading viewers from São Paulo and Maranhão to complain about the constant reruns of the extinct network's programming.

In October 2020, businessman Rinaldi Faria, creator of the clown duo Patati Patatá, acquired the channel together with Rede 41 from the city of Pirassununga in the interior of São Paulo.

On November 20, TV Eldorado ended its relays of Esporte Interativo's content and became Rede Mais Família, beginning to produce its own programs, and its programming was in test phase. On December 1, the network expanded to Rio de Janeiro, replacing a Boas Novas relayer.

On April 7, 2025, it was announced that the channel would be replaced by a TV version of the SBT News portal, in a partnership involving businessman Rinaldi Faria and Grupo Silvio Santos. The choice of the frequency was due to the fact that Rede Mais Família had availability in a good part of the country, also having ANATEL-authorized relay stations. Initially scheduled to be launched within a 90-day period, but with broadcasts of a provisional format of its programs on YouTube and streaming service +SBT, SBT informed that it was an "embryonary service" with no immediate launch.

On January 1, 2026, Grupo Jovem Pan announced a partnership with the station to generate programming for the conglomerate's new open television network starting January 7. With the agreement, Jovem Pan will be broadcast in São Paulo, through the Santa Inês station's retransmitter on UHF channel 51.

On January 16, the debut of Jovem Pan on free-to-air TV was announced for the following day, on the same channels already announced, but with retransmission on channel 51.1 in São Paulo. With this, channel 19 in Santa Inês becomes the originating station for the new network and ceases to transmit the programming of Rede Mais Família, which is now generated by the Pirassununga station.
