= Claudete Troiano =

Brazilian television presenter (born 1953)

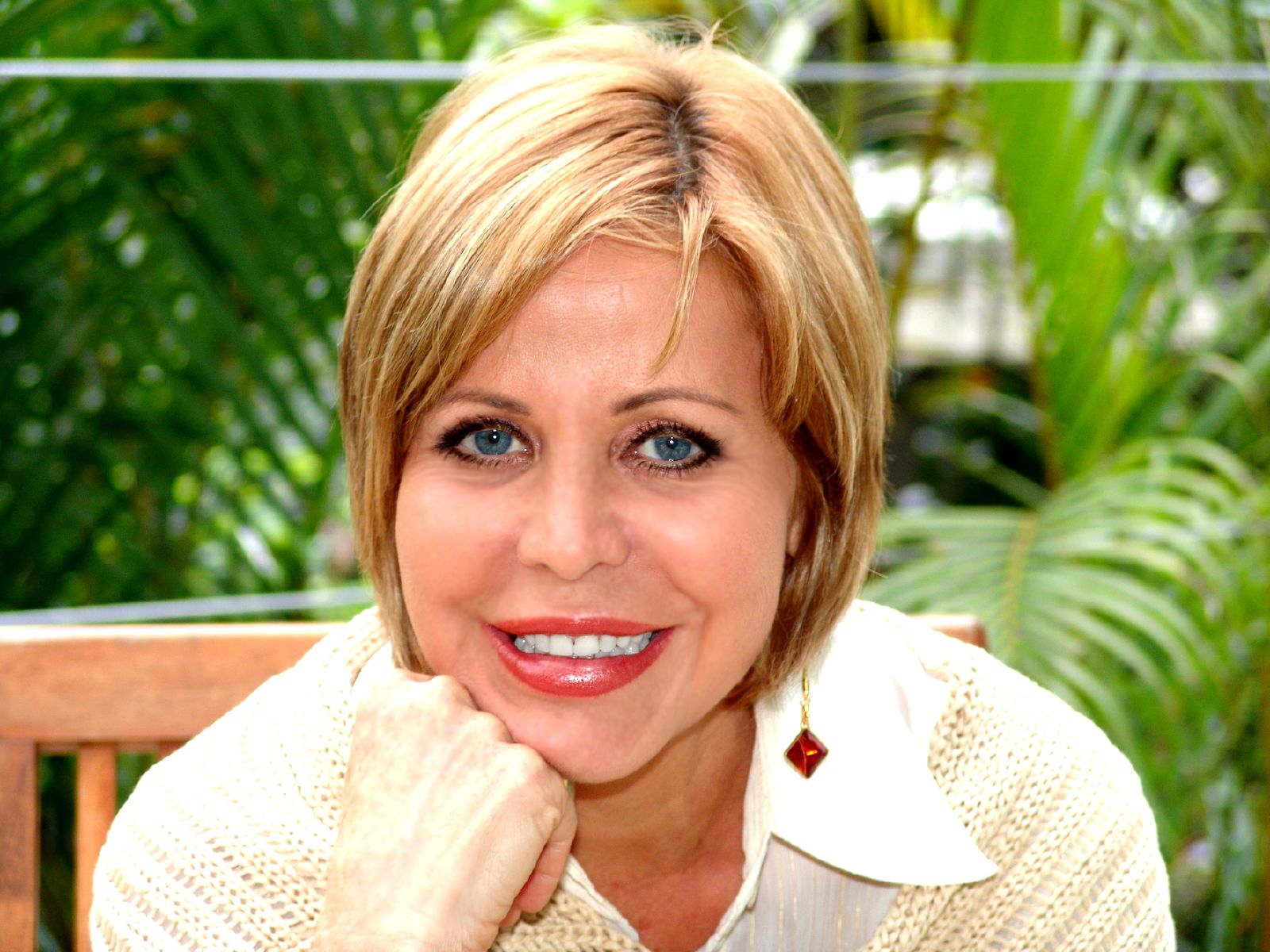
- Troiano in 2005.
- Born: October 29, 1953 (age 72); São Paulo, Brazil
- Occupation: Television presenter
- Children: 1

Claudete Troiano de Moraes Manso, better known as Claudete Troiano (born October 29, 1953), is a Brazilian television presenter and former actress.

== Career ==
In 1960, at the age of seven, Troiano was in the auditorium of a program from TV Excelsior, when she was invited by a producer to make a test, where she was approved and started to present the kids program Carrossel (Carousel). In 1964, Troiano was hired by Band to present the kids program Garota Bandeirantes (Bandeirantes Girl), where she remained by four years. In 1969, Troiano debuted as an actress in the telenovela O Bolha (The Bubble Man), playing the rebellious teenager Judith. Between 1969 and 1974, still on Band, she presented Tic Tac, program dedicated to the teenager public, that mixed musical shows and reports about the young universe. In 1974, Troiano played Elza on the telenovela Ídolo de Pano (Cloth Idol), in Rede Tupi, being her last acting on the dramas.

Soon after, Troiano joined to the journalism school and passed to dedicate to radio, passing by the radios Bandeirantes, Globo, Capital and Mulher, where she was the pioneer at being the first woman to relate soccer games. In 1980, already graduated, Troiano returned to the television to present the afternoon program Mulheres (Women), on TV Gazeta, alongside Ione Borges, where they remained by sixteen years in a row and they passed to be known as the “parceirinhas” by the success of the duo. In 1996, the partnership was dissolved, when Troiano was transferred to the mornings of the station to present the program Pra Você (For You), at the same style. In 1998, Troiano signed with Rede Manchete to present the program Mulher de Hoje (Woman of Today), on which she remained only one year, because the financial crisis that the station was going through led to its closure, making Troiano returning to TV Gazeta, in the same program of before.

In 2000, Troiano took over Note e Anote (Note and Note), on Record, replacing Catia Fonseca, on which she remained until 2005, when the program left the air to be replaced by Hoje em Dia (Today in Day). On the same year, she was transferred to Band and presented the program Pra Valer (For Real) until 2007, when the station ended her contract after the arrest of her daughter. In 2008, Troiano signed with SBT to present Olha Você (Look It You), an electronic magazine based in the style of Hoje em Dia, alongside Ellen Jabour, Alexandre Bacci and Francesco Tarallo, which went off the air on March 20, 2009. In 2009, after nine years, she returns to TV Gazeta to present Manhã Gazeta (Gazeta Morning), resuming the partnership with Ione Borges. On March 17, 2012, Troiano is notified that the station ended her contract after the programming suffer a reformulation. In 2014, after two years out of the air, she debuts in the presentation of the program Santa Receita (Saint Recipe), on TV Aparecida, program that initially was only dedicated to the cuisine, but that over the years, it passed to address other topics of the female universe, like service provision, the women's health and career, where she remained until July 2020, when she was dismissed from the station.

On June 28, 2019, Troiano got a second program in the station, the Programa Claudete Troiano (Claudete Troiano Program), dedicated to interviews and musical shows.

On September 18, 2020, Troiano was announced as the new hired of RedeTV!. Her program in the station, named Vou te Contar (I Will Tell You), had exclusive sponsorship of Ultrafarma, of the businessman Sidney Oliveira.

== Personal life ==
Since 1982, Troiano is married to the systems analyst Valmir Manso, with whom she has a daughter, named Marcela.

== Controversies ==
=== Troiano's daughter arrest and demission ===
On March 25, 2007, Troiano's daughter, Marcela Troiano, was arrested at being accused of drug trafficking during a blitz, on which narcotics were found on a bus she had hired to celebrate her birthday with her friends. Four days after the arrest, she was released. Despite Troiano explaining that it was all a misunderstanding, Band decided to terminate her contract a month and a half later.

=== Fight with João Kléber ===
In 2003, Troiano became involved in a public fight with the presenter João Kléber, whom Claudete accused of being complicit in alleged schemes on his show at the time, Canal Aberto (Open Channel), which competed for audience share with Note e Anote when it aired in the afternoon.
