= Cásper Líbero =

Brazilian journalist

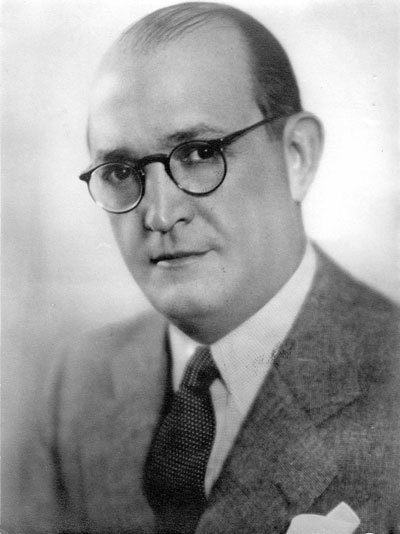
- Cásper Líbero, Brazilian journalist and media entrepreneur, known for his innovations in journalism and commitment to ethical reporting.
- Born: March 2, 1889; Bragança Paulista, São Paulo, Brazil
- Died: August 27, 1943 (aged 54); Rio de Janeiro, Brazil
- Occupation: Journalist

Cásper Líbero (March 2, 1889 – August 27, 1943) was a Brazilian journalist and media entrepreneur.

== Early life and education ==
Líbero was born in Bragança Paulista, São Paulo, to Honório Líbero, a doctor and politician, and Zerbina de Toledo Líbero, a local figure. He moved to São Paulo at a young age. Líbero graduated with a bachelor's degree in Legal and Social Sciences from the Faculty of Law at the University of São Paulo at the age of 19.

Although he briefly practiced law, serving as an attorney for the Mato Grosso Treasury, his interest in journalism soon drew him away from the legal profession.

== Career ==
Líbero began his journalism career as the head of the Rio de Janeiro branch of O Estado de S. Paulo. At the age of 21, he founded Agência Americana, a news agency in São Paulo focused entirely on national news. He co-founded the newspaper Última Hora in 1911.

In 1918, at the age of 29, Líbero became director and owner of the newspaper A Gazeta. He modernized the newspaper by importing rotary presses from Germany, replacing the telegraph with the teletype, and implementing new engraving, composition and graphic printing techniques, the first in color in Brazil. At the same time, he implemented a new dynamic in the transportation and distribution of the newspaper, enabling copies to reach readers in record time.

In 1932, he was one of the leaders of the Constitutionalist Revolution. After the revolution, Cásper Líbero went into exile in the United States and later, in France.

From 1940 to 1941, he presided over the National Press Federation (FENAI-FAIBRA). Líbero also created a supplement dedicated to sports and football coverage, called A Gazeta Esportiva.

Cásper, passionate about sports, founded the traditional Saint Silvester Road Race, held annually on December 31st. He also established the July 9 Cycling Race, in honor of the Constitutionalist Revolution of 1932, along with other events like the São Paulo Swimming Crossing on the Tietê River and the Brazilian University Games.

In 1943, Cásper acquired Rádio Educadora Paulista (currently Gazeta Online), a radio station in São Paulo.

== Death and legacy ==
On August 27, 1943, Cásper died in a plane crash when VASP plane "Cidade de São Paulo" crashed into the Naval Academy Tower near Guanabara Bay in Rio de Janeiro. After his death, he left, in accordance with his will, a communications complex currently administered by the Cásper Líbero Foundation bringing together TV Gazeta, Rádio Gazeta, Gazeta FM, the Gazeta Esportiva portal, the Faculdade Cásper Líbero and the Grupo Cidadania Empresarial. The Cásper Líbero Foundation manages his assets, and in accordance with his wishes, also created the first Journalism school in the country, the Cásper Líbero College.

He is buried in the São Paulo Obelisk, where the remains of leaders of the Constitutionalist Revolution of 1932 rest.
