= TV Goiânia =

TV Goiânia (ZYA 580)
- Goiânia, Goiás; Brazil
- Channels: Digital: 30 (UHF); Virtual: 11

Programming
- Affiliations: Jovem Pan

Ownership
- Owner: Rede Vitoriosa de Comunicações; (Televisão Goyá Ltda.)
- Sister stations: Rádio Bons Ventos; Rádio Mania

History
- First air date: March 1, 1996
- Former names: Band Goiás (2023)
- Former channel numbers: Analog: 11 (VHF, 1996–2017)
- Former affiliations: Rede Bandeirantes (1996–2024); Rede Meio Norte (2024–2025); Canal UOL (2025–2026)

Technical information
- Licensing authority: ANATEL
- ERP: 3.5 kW
- Transmitter coordinates: 16°39′51.8″S 49°20′26.8″W

Links
- Public license information: Profile
- Website: www.tvgoiania.com.br

TV Goiânia (channel 11) is a Jovem Pan-affiliated television station licensed to Goiânia, capital of the state of Goiás. It was founded by Diários Associados in 1996 and was sold to businessman Wellington Salgado de Oliveira, its current owner, in 2002. Its studios are located in the Serrinha neighborhood, and its transmitting antenna is at Morro do Mendanha, in the Jardim Petrópolis neighborhood.

Channel 11 in itself was activated in the late 80s as a relay station of TV Brasília, however in 1996, Diários Associados officially turned it into a signal generator, ceasing its relay of the station and Rede Manchete, becoming a Rede Bandeirantes affiliate, which had lost its signal in the state after TV Brasil Central joined TV Cultura a year prior.

== History ==
=== Rede Bandeirantes (1987–2024) ===
On November 11, 1987, TV Brasília forms a partnership with advertising agency Makro Publicidade, forming Rede Manchete Centro, headquartered in Brasília, on channel 6, with a relay station on channel 11 in Goiânia. This arrangement doubled TV Brasília's reach, covering a potential market of four million viewers. From then on in Goiânia, a small commercial and news unit was created. This partnership was dissolved nearly a decade later, when Associados relaunched the station as TV Goiânia, a Rede Bandeirantes affiliate.

In July 1991, the station, which, until then, relayed TV Brasília in full, including its local commercials, started generating its own signal, after obtaining a license.

TV Goiânia was founded in its own right on March 1, 1996, by Diários Associados. On June 2, 2002, the Salgado de Oliveira University, of Wellington Salgado de Oliveira, acquired the station from the group, causing a series of changes at the station, among them the reactivation of its news operation, expansion of its signal, and the creation of Chumbo Grosso, a low-end criminal news program. During 28 years, it was a Rede Bandeirantes affiliate, producing several programs, among them news, sports and even time-brokered independent programming, such as televangelists, home shopping, etc. In 2017, the station ceases airing its local news service, Band Cidade.

In June 2020, the station suspends its local programming, alleging operational problems after moving its headquarters. In June 2021, the station hired Mariana Martins, which left Record Goiás, to present her new program, No Controle, which started in July.

Changes at the station's operations in 2021 followed by the signing of Leandro Vieira caused the station to have improved ratings and finances in 2022. Its revenues increased 150% from April to December 2021, but increased to over 500% (more than three times) during the entirety of 2022. It also hired a team to cover news from Rio Verde.

On October 19, 2023, TV Goiânia announced that it would change its name for the first time after 27 years, to TV Bandeirantes Goiás. The change was expected for November 6, along with the launch of a new schedule, after Francis Maia, superintendent of communications at Companhia de Urbanização de Goiânia, took on the station's directive. On October 31, however, after the start of the transition, Bandeirantes rejected the usage of its name, interrupting the change period. In addition, the two stations were facing a crisis phase, with the network's head in São Paulo showing dissatisfaction for interferences in relation to its network schedule.

On December 19, it was announced that the station did not have its retransmission contract with Rede Bandeirantes renewed after 28 years of partnership, losing its affiliation to the then- TV Record affiliate, TV Sucesso, after announcing an affiliation deal which involved a statewide expansion, which included metropolitan Goiânia.

=== Rede Meio (2024–2025) ===
On March 1, 2024, the day of its 28th anniversary, then-director and presenter of Rede Meio, Erlan Bastos, announced that TV Goiânia would become an affiliate of the network, which was initially denied. The partnership also included a new weekly national program hosted by Jorge Kajuru. The affiliation switch between Band, Meio Norte and Record on both TV Goiânia and TV Sucesso happened on March 4. Around midnight, Band's signal was cut at the end of Apito Final and was replaced by Meio Norte during the airing og The Ladykillers, previously shown on TV Globo's Supercine days earlier.

=== Canal UOL (2025–2026) ===
On July 1, 2025, TV Goiânia's owner, Wellington Salgado, signed an agreement to relay cable network Canal UOL, making it its first over-the-air affiliate. The affiliation switch took place on July 8 at 11:36pm, after a commercial break.

=== Jovem Pan (2026–present) ===
On September 30, 2026, the station joined Jovem Pan.

== Technical information ==
Virtual	Digital channel	Aspect ratio	Content
11.1	30 UHF	1080i	TV Goiânia/Jovem Pan TV's programming

The station started its digital signal on UHF channel 30 on April 16, 2014, for Goiânia and surrounding areas.

Its analog signal on VHF channel 11 shut down on June 21, 2017, the date of the shutdown of analog television in Goiânia.
