= TV São Luís =

- São Luís, Maranhão; Brazil
- Channels: Digital: 41 (UHF); Virtual: 8

Programming
- Affiliations: Jovem Pan

Ownership
- Owner: Grupo Zildeni Falcão; (Rádio TV do Maranhão Ltda.)
- Sister stations: Jovem Pan FM São Luís

History
- First air date: December 6, 1989
- Former channel numbers: Analog: 8 (VHF, 1981–2018)
- Former affiliations: Rede Manchete (1989–1997); Rede Record (1997–2004); RedeTV! (2004-2026)

Technical information
- Licensing authority: ANATEL
- ERP: 0,51 kW
- Transmitter coordinates: 2°32′43.9″S 44°17′45.6″W

Links
- Public license information: Profile

TV São Luís (channel 8) is a RedeTV!-affiliated television station licensed to São Luís, capital of the state of Maranhão. The station is owned by Grupo Zildêni Falcão, who also owns Jovem Pan FM São Luís and magazine distributor DIMAPI.

== History ==
=== Rede Manchete (1989–1997) ===
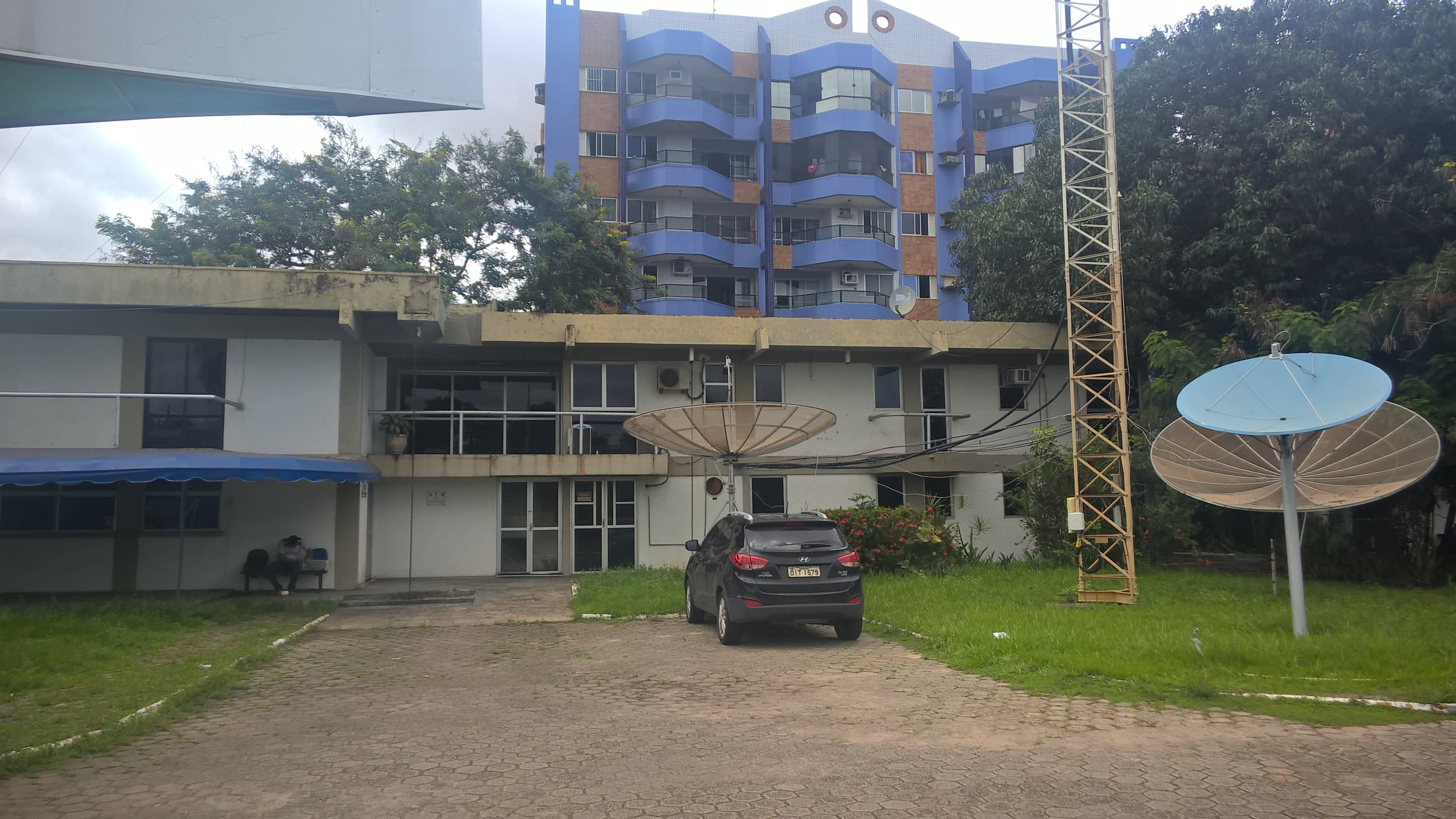
Station headquarters in 2016.

The station opened on 6 December 1989 as a Rede Manchete affiliate, although it was already on air with Manchete in its experimental phase.

In January 1990, it premiered its only local program - Maranhão em Manchete, which aired until 1995. In 1994, a local paid program, Shopping Tudo, produced by Sistema WCS de Comunicação and presented by Wagner Silva, went on air.

Maranhão em Manchete ended in 1995 and was replaced by Aconteceu... Virou Manchete in the weekday afternoon slot. In 1996, the police program Patrulha Policial started airing on weekday mornings, lasting until the end of 1998. It then returned from 2001 to 2005, and again, between May 2007 and May 2008.

Between March and April 1997, according to TV columns on local newspapers, the directorate of Grupo Zildêni Falcão was worried about Manchete's downfall, and, coupled with the mass affiliate exodus since 1995, it decided to no longer continue airing the network, however, they have not decided which network to affiliate two, even if they would leave Manchete. In May, according to local and even national newspapers (including Folha de S. Paulo, from São Paulo) the reports about the end of the Manchete affiliation went true, joining Record.It even published information on the possibility of Edir Macedo buying the station, making it a prospective O&O.

That month, two weeks before changing the network, the station put commercials informing the switch, showing Record's programs.

At the end of May, it was announced that the affiliation switch would happen in early June.

=== Rede Record (1997–2004) ===
On the early hours of 2 June 1997, TV São Luís ceased broadcasting Manchete to air a countdown to its new affiliation: Rede Record (now RecordTV), with music videos of local Bumba-Meu-Boi singers and 30-second promos for Record's programs.

It started at 8am that day with local programming; this also gave Record its first affiliate in the state. One hour later it started airing networked programming with Mundo Maravilha, followed at 12pm by Aconteceu (formerly Aconteceu... Virou Manchete). It was downsized to hourly bulletins in 2001, where it lasted until 2003.

Record took advantage of the downfall of Manchete and even acquired SBT affiliates (such as TV Itapoan and founding stations that already had a construction permit (such as TV Marajoara. Manchete recouped its lost affiliation in 1998 with TV Praia Grande.

In 2001, it started airing Doda Car, presented by Doda from Pernambuco, resposnible for the introduction of kart in Maranhão. On 5 November 2003, the presenter was found dead at his own residence, consequence of a heart attack.

=== RedeTV! (2004–2026) ===
In March 2004, with the end of its contract with Rede Record, it announced that it would join RedeTV! from 1 April. The last program seen under its former affiliation was Jornal da Record 2.ª edição, then it signed off for the night and resumed as an affiliate of the new network.

On 16 April 2007, after eight years on air (since when it was a Record affiliate) São Luís Debate did not air and its presenter Chico Viana was withdrawn. At an Orkut community, Chico Viana said that then-governor Aderson Lago (brother of governador Jackson Lago) was responsible, for pressioning the Falcão Family to take the program off the air, after repercussions the program had of news given by blogger Décio Sá that the governor named, on 12 April, relatives of politician Aderson Lago (his mother at an old age, his wife, son and nephew) to high-ranking posts with wages of over R$6,000 at the Legislative Assembly, where Lago already had a son working there. The presenter also showed coherence from the then-governor, which, in opposition, was against practices from the Sarney family (such as nepotism) and repeated these practices in the government, confessing that while Roseana Sarney was the acting governor, she was never a targed of such persecution. Viewer reactions to the sudden removal were negative and it only returned in May, still presented under Viana.

On 4 February 2026, it was announced that it would end its 22-year partnership with RedeTV! and would join Jovem Pan, with São Luís becoming the second state capital capital to receive the signal of Grupo Jovem Pan's new network, after Cuiabá. According to the station, the transition would take up to ninety days. One of the possible factors presented by the station was dissatisfaction with RedeTV!'s structural changes, affecting its schedule as a whole. This information was confirmed on November 13th during the closing of Estúdio 8 (Studio 8) on the channel, announcing the change of broadcasting rights for the 16th. RedeTV! would then be retransmitted on channel 18.1, also owned by the Grupo Zildêni Falcão (Zildêni Falcão Group), which previously broadcast MTV Brasil, Ideal TV, Loading and Xsports.

Jovem Pan (2026-present)

Around midnight, RedeTV!'s signal was cut off during the broadcast of the Chinese soap opera The Best Thing and replaced with a promotional announcement of the change, while the production finished its broadcast on channel 18.1, which now houses the former station. Jovem Pan's debut took place during the broadcast of Match Gastronômico (Match Gastronomic).

== Technical information ==
Virtual channel	Digital channel	Aspect ratio	Content
8.1	18 UHF	1080i	TV São Luís/Joven Pan's main programming

The station started digital broadcasts through UHF channeL 41 on 23 December 2014, becoming definitive one week later. Since then, it mirrored the analog signal seen on VHF channel 8, in 4:3 widescreen. In 2015, it started producing content in high definition, but due to the transmission method, these were originally not seen in this format.

The analog signal over VHF channel 8 closed on 25 March 2018, three days ahead of the ANATEL roadmap (28 March).
