= Catia Fonseca =

Brazilian television presenter

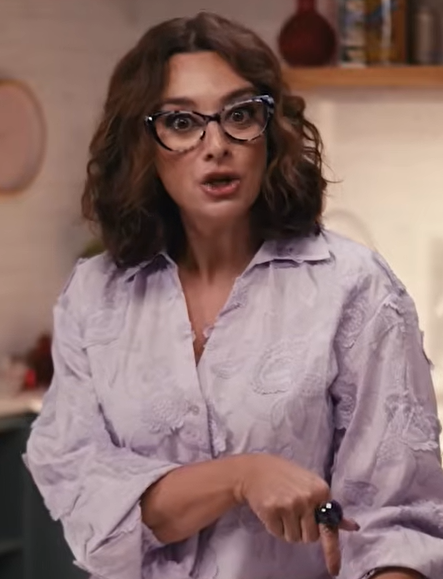
- Fonseca in 2025
- Born: Catia Cilene de Souza Pedreschi; February 1, 1969 (age 57); São Paulo, Brazil
- Occupation: Television presenter
- Spouse: Dafnis da Fonseca (m. 1986; div. 2013)
- Partner: Rodrigo Riccó (2013–present)
- Children: 2
- Website: http://www.tvcatiafonseca.com.br

Catia Cilene de Miranda e Fonseca (née de Souza Pedreschi), better known as Catia Fonseca (born February 1, 1969) is a Brazilian television presenter. Fonseca graduated in Radio and Television by the Serviço Nacional de Aprendizagem Comercial.

== Career ==
In 1986, at the age of 17, Catia saw a newspaper ad looking for a secretary for radio Antena 1, winning the position and staying at the company for six years. At this time, she became interested in the craft and, after studying Radio and TV, took some tests on television and radio, although she did not pass. In 1994, she learned of the opening of a new station in São Paulo, Rede Mulher (currently Record News), which was looking for aspiring presenters to hire. Catia performed the tests and, without receiving a response, went on to go to the station several days in a row to ask the directors to give her a chance. Hired that year, she debuted the cooking show Com Sabor (English: With Taste). In 1995, she joined the morning presenter Universo Feminino (English: Female Universe), which addressed general topics related to women, such as quality of life, positioning in the job market and family issues. At the end of 1997, she left the station, refusing a contract renewal to invest in her own venture, a bakery.

In January 1998, she is invited by Rede Manchete to take over the program Mulher de Hoje (English: Woman of Today) and, after rejecting the invitation first to dedicate herself to bakery, closes an agreement that she would only stay three months while the station tried to find another presenter. In March 1998, she signed with TV Gazeta and took over the program Pra Você (English: To You). In 1999, she signed with RecordTV to lead Note e Anote (English: Note and Note) in place of Ana Maria Braga, after being targeted by the good repercussion with the sponsors. In 2000, she also went on to direct Note e Anote. In September of the same year, she was removed from the program after a year and a half. At the time, Catia explained to Isto É Gente magazine that presenter Claudete Troiano had planned to take her post at Note e Anote: "I wouldn't use the means she used. I heard that she asked a director to tell the station's executives that it was more into account and accepted to earn half of what I did". The station even offered a program in the afternoons for Catia, but the presenter preferred to end her contract because she considered the situation unpleasant and did not want to find the replacement in the corridors of the station.

In 2002, Catia returned to TV Gazeta and took over Mulheres (English: Women), restructuring the program, removing the sensationalism and tragic cases and bringing back the original format with reports aimed at the female audience, cuisine and service provision. On September 4, 2015, she launches her own YouTube channel, TV Catia Fonseca, featuring interviews, recipes and travel videos. On September 30, 2017, she launches her own website, also called TV Catia Fonseca, with recipes, fashion, beauty, travel and other tips. On December 12, 2017, Catia announced her departure from Gazeta after fifteen years in charge of Mulheres and signed a contract with Band to premiere Melhor da Tarde, on March 1, 2018. On August 1, 2020, she made her debut on radio as a presenter on Rádio Bandeirantes, with the program Do Bom e do Melhor (English: Of The Good and The Best), together with Danilo Gobatto, broadcast on Saturday mornings. Fonseca presented the program until August 28, 2021.

== Personal life ==
In 1986, at age 17, she married journalist Dafnis da Fonseca. In 1987, her firstborn, Thiago, was born and, in 1992, her second child, Felipe. Still in 1991, she joined the Radio and Television course by the Serviço Nacional de Aprendizagem Comercial, graduating two years later. In May 2013, after 27 years of marriage, she announced her separation, revealing that she had been putting off the decision for a few years. In November of the same year, she assumes a relationship with director Rodrigo Riccó.

== Works ==
=== Television ===
| Year | Title | Role | Notes |
|---|---|---|---|
| 1994 | Com Sabor (With Taste) | presenter | |
| 1995-97 | Universo Feminino (Female Universe) | presenter | |
| 1998 | Mulher de Hoje (Woman of Today) | presenter | |
| 1998-99 | Pra Você (To You) | presenter | |
| 1999-00 | Note e Anote (Note and Note) | presenter | |
| 2002–2017 | Mulheres (Women) | presenter | |
| 2018–2025 | Melhor da Tarde (Best of the Afternoon) | presenter | |
| 2019 | Noite Feliz (Happy Night) | presenter | End of year special |
| 2020 | Mulheres (Women) | special presenter | Episode: "September 23" |
| 2025 | Dança dos Famosos | contestant (20th place) | Season 22 |
| 2025 | Band Folia | presenter | |

=== Internet ===
| Year | Title | Role | Platform |
|---|---|---|---|
| 2015–present | TV Catia Fonseca | presenter | YouTube |

=== Radio ===
| Year | Title | Role | Radio station |
|---|---|---|---|
| 2020-2021 | Do Bom e do Melhor (Of The Good and The Best) | presenter | Rádio Bandeirantes |

== Awards and nominations ==
| Year | Award | Category | Result | Ref. |
|---|---|---|---|---|
| 2023 | Melhores do Ano NaTelinha | Best Woman Presenter | Nominated | |
