= Ione Borges =

Brazilian television presenter (1951–2025)

- Born: December 15, 1951; São Paulo, São Paulo, Brazil
- Died: November 24, 2025 (aged 73); São Paulo, São Paulo, Brazil
- Occupations: Journalist; television presenter; writer
- Years active: 1963–2020

Ione Borges (December 15, 1951 – November 24, 2025) was a Brazilian television presenter, former model, and actress.

== Early life and career ==
Borges was born in São Paulo on December 15, 1951. She began her career in 1963, at the age of 12, participating in the children's programs Grande Gincana Kibon and Programa Pullman Junior, both on Rede Record, as a freshman in the musical talent boards, inspired by her father who was a musician.

In 1964, she began working as a clothing model. Early in her career, she became a poster girl for Clipper and, in 1969, she was hired by the brand's biggest competitor, Mappin, where she would stay for ten years.

In 1971, she starred in the telenovela Meu Pedacinho de Chão, on TV Globo, as Rosinha. In 1972, she starred in films Voices of Fear, as Cássia, and O Jeca e o Bode, as Jandira. In the same year, she signed with TV Gazeta and started to command a fashion panel on the program Clarice Amaral em Desfile, showing a weekly fashion show with Mappin pieces.

In 1980, after eight years leading fashion shows, she was invited to present her own program after the departure of Clarice Amaral.

== Personal life and death ==
Borges married French businessman Jean François in 1993. She died on November 24, 2025, at the age of 73.
