= Guga Chacra =

Brazilian journalist

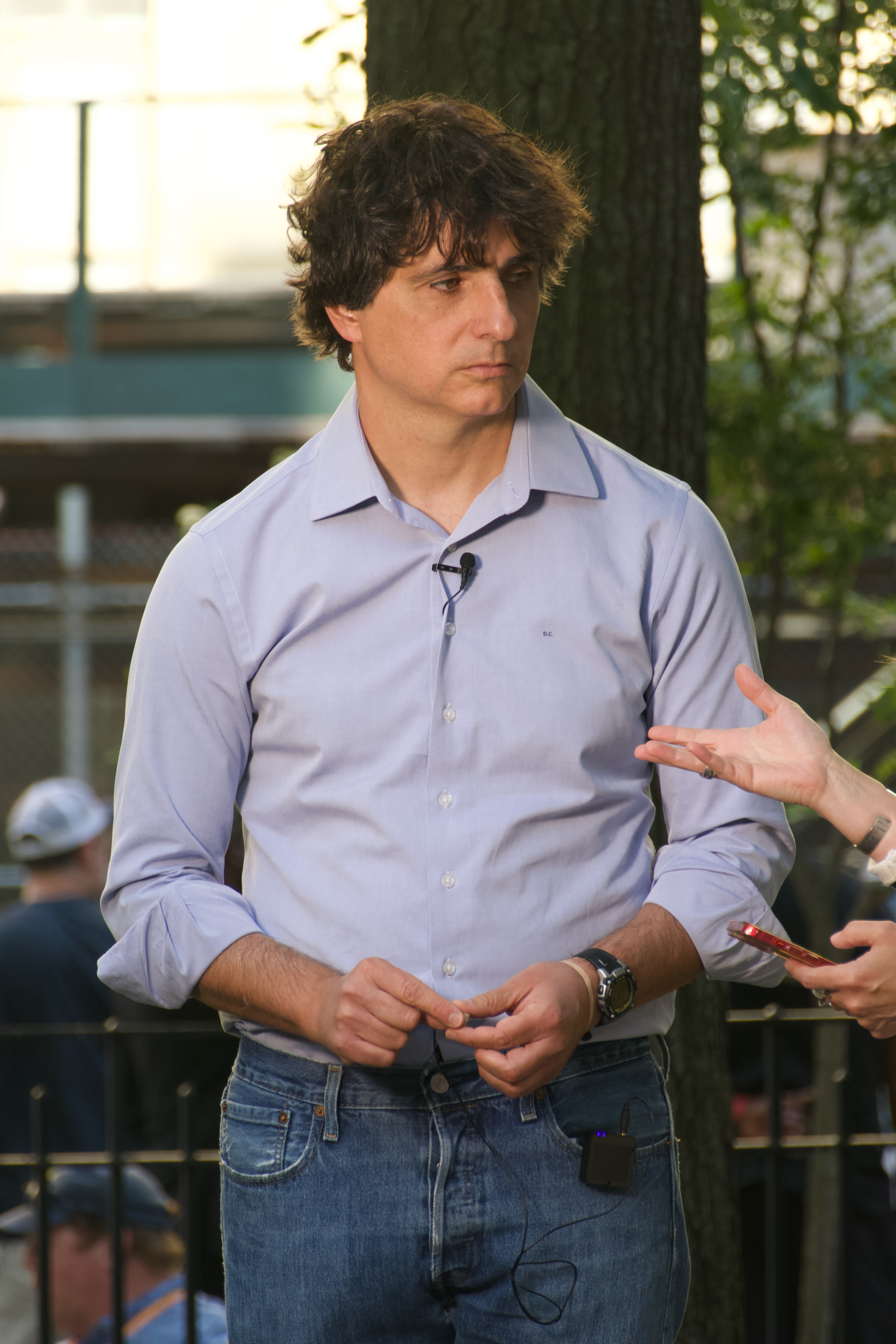
- Chacra in 2024
- Born: Gustavo Cerello Chacra; May 27, 1976 (age 50); São Paulo, Brazil
- Occupations: Journalist, columnist, news anchor

Guga Chacra, also known as Gustavo Cerello Chacra (born 27 May 1976), is a Brazilian journalist. He serves as a commentator on international politics for the GloboNews programs Em Pauta and Jornal das Dez. Additionally, Chacra is a regular anchor on GloboNews Internacional.

Chacra also writes a weekly column in the World section of the newspaper O Globo since May 2017 and worked at Grupo Estado for ten years, until May 2018. He is a correspondent from New York, where he moved in August 2005. He also presented the international news bulletin on the now-defunct Rádio Estadão and was an international correspondent for O Estado de S. Paulo in New York between 2009 and 2014.

== Early life ==
Chacra, born in São Paulo, Brazil, is the grandson of Italian and Lebanese migrants who were Greek-Orthodox Christians. His father, Antonio Roberto Chacra, was a doctor and former vice president of the International Diabetes Federation.

Initially, Chacra was encouraged by his father to pursue a career in medicine. However, he was drawn to journalism from an early age. His passion for sports news gradually expanded to international journalism, particularly due to his interest in the Middle East and the Israeli-Palestinian conflict. He has a master's degree in international relations from Columbia University. He has lived in the cities of Beirut, Boston, Buenos Aires, Columbia and São Paulo, and currently lives in New York.

== Career ==
Chacra graduated from Cásper Líbero College in the late 1990s. He began his journalism career in December 1998 after winning the Folha de S. Paulo trainee competition. In March 1999, he left São Paulo to work as a reporter for Revista ISTOE. He returned to Folha de S. Paulo in August of the same year and served as its international correspondent based in Buenos Aires from January 2000 to January 2002.

Chacra moved to New York City in August 2005 and obtained a master's degree in International Relations from Columbia University. After graduating, he traveled throughout the Middle East from 2007 to 2008, which is said to have marked the beginning of his working relationship with O Estado de S. Paulo, Brazil's largest newspaper. In July 2007, he was officially employed by O Estado de S. Paulo as its international correspondent for the Middle East. He also began publishing a blog for the newspaper's web portal called "From Beirut to New York."

After returning to New York, Chacra was invited to provide commentary for a program on GloboNews, Brazil's largest news broadcaster. Following this stint, he was offered a position as a correspondent at the company's New York studio. Chacra now appears regularly on several GloboNews programs, including Em Pauta, Jornal das Dez, and Jornal GloboNews.

According to Foreign Policy Magazine Chacra's Twitter page is considered one of the most influential in Latin America internationally. He is also an outspoken supporter of Brazilian football, particularly the club SE Palmeiras.

He received the Comunique-se Award as Best International Correspondent in the Written Media category in 2015 and 2017.

=== International coverage ===
Gustavo Chacra specializes in issues related to the Middle East, having developed reports and political and socioeconomic panoramas on the West Bank, Egypt, the United Arab Emirates, the Gaza Strip, Yemen, Israel, Jordan, Lebanon, Oman, Qatar, Syria and Turkey. In the region, he covered important events such as the Lebanon War between July and August 2006 and the conflicts in the Gaza Strip between December 2008 and January 2009. Gustavo also specializes in the issue involving the Israeli-Palestinian conflict, where he seeks to provide a clearer view of the reasons for the impasse, and covered the expansion of the Islamic terrorist group Al-Qaeda in Yemen in December 2009.

On a global scale, he also covered the political crisis in Honduras, which overthrew then-president Manuel Zelaya in June 2009, the 2008–2009 US economic crisis, with the collapse of the Lehman Brothers investment bank in September 2008, and the earthquake in Haiti in January 2010.

=== Books ===
Gustavo is the author of the book "Confined on the Front: Notes on the New World Geopolitics", the first edition of which was released in 2020 by Editora Todavia. He is the co-author of two books. The first is called "Fazendo As Malas", released in August 2012 by Editora Saraiva. The second book is called "Os Hermanos E Nós", written in partnership with journalist Ariel Palacios and released in May 2014 by Editora Contexto.

=== Controversy ===
In November 2017, Chacra tweeted a report from The Guardian newspaper, which stated that "60,000 nationalists marched in Poland to celebrate the country's independence day, shouting xenophobic slogans and displaying far-right symbols, a demonstration that was described by anti-fascists as a rallying cry for far-right groups worldwide." In the message, Chacra commented: "I warn the [sympathizers] in Brazil that Brazilians are not considered white by these Nazis." The statement generated controversy and received criticism, including from the Polish consul in Brazil, Katarzyna Braiter, who claimed that the event was a celebration of Poland's independence and the end of the Nazi occupation.

== Personal life ==
Chacra married Ana Maria Saleme Meirelles in 2014, and together they have two children, Júlia and Antônio. The family also has a dog named Messi, as a tribute to the Argentine soccer player.
