= Ronnie Von =

Brazilian singer

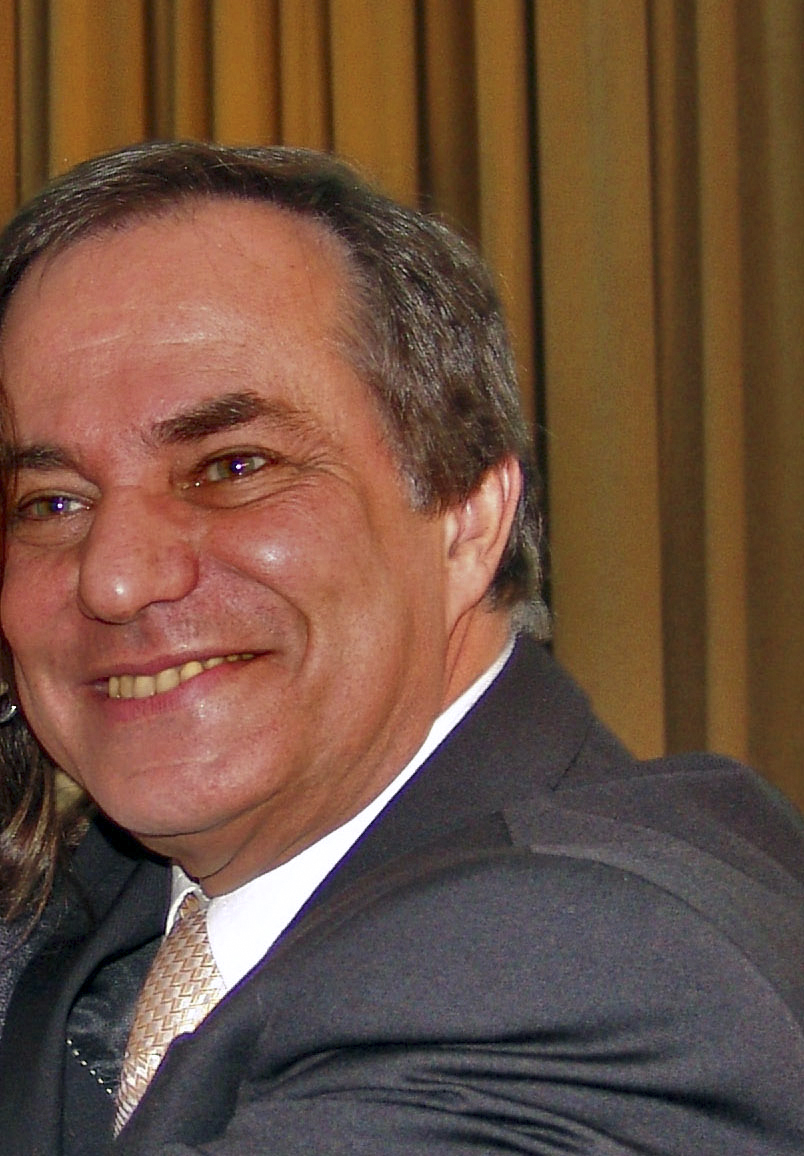
- Ronnie Von in 2014

Background information
- Born: Ronaldo Nogueira; July 17, 1944 (age 82); Niterói, Rio de Janeiro, Brazil
- Origin: Brazil
- Occupations: Singer-songwriter, TV presenter, actor
- Years active: 1965–present

Ronaldo Nogueira (born July 17, 1944), better known as Ronnie Von, is a Brazilian singer-songwriter, TV presenter and actor.

Ronnie became known in the 1960s associated with Brazilian rock, and between 2004 until 2019 presented the TV night show Todo Seu (Portuguese for "All Yours") on TV Gazeta.

== Biography ==
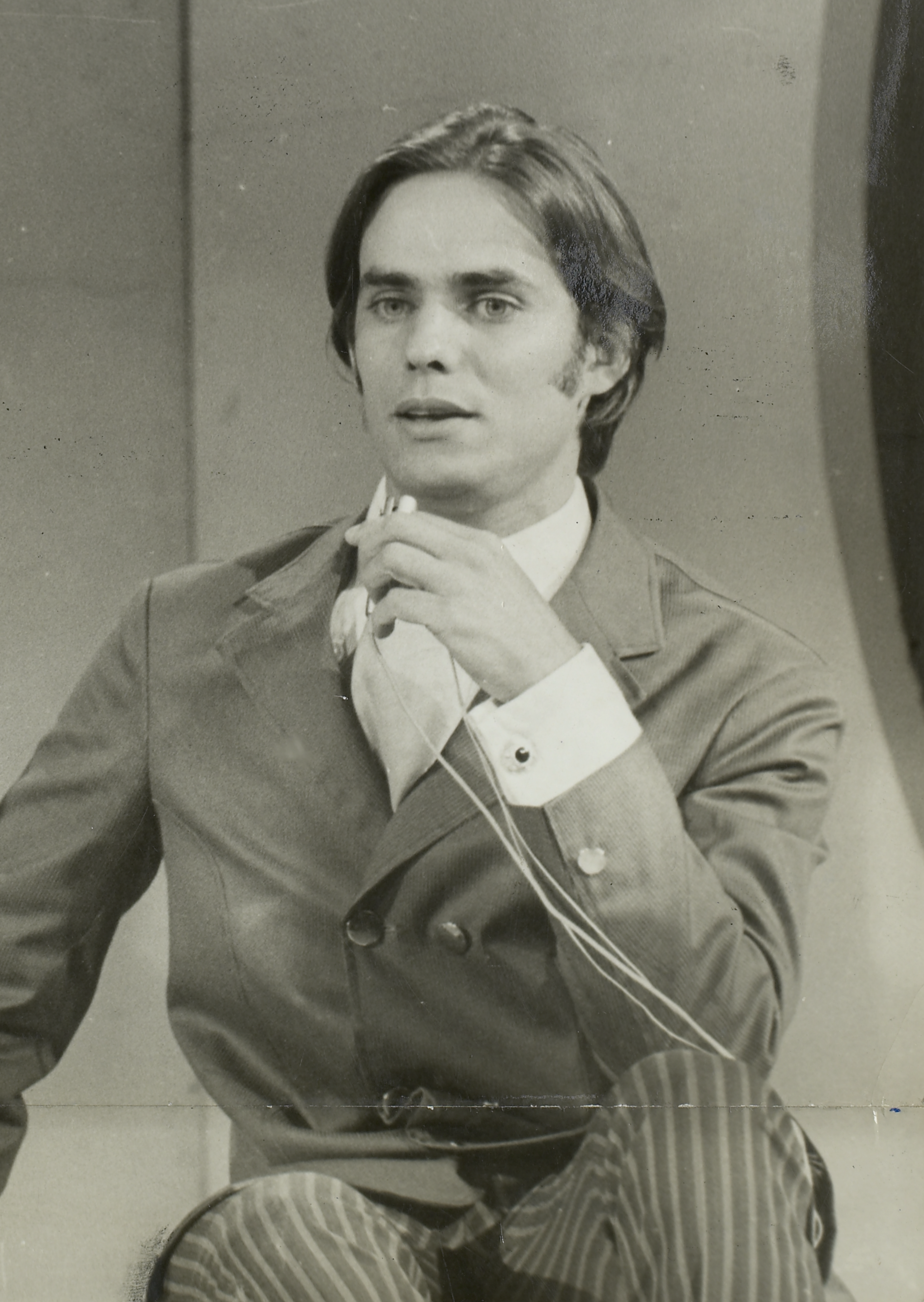
Ronnie Von on an unknown date

Some of his greater successes include the hits Meu Bem – a Portuguese version of The Beatles' Girl – and A Praça. He quickly earned the nickname O pequeno príncipe, or Little Prince, after participating in an interview with Hebe Camargo. Ronnie started hosting his own television program in 1966, O Pequeno Mundo de Ronnie Von. Os Mutantes became a regular guest band on the show. Besides opening the door for the band, Ronnie Von also brought Gilberto Gil and Caetano Veloso to appear on the show regularly, which would be the beginnings of the Tropicália movement, even though he was never part of the movement. During this period, the press tried to create a supposed rivalry between him and Roberto Carlos.

In 1968, he released a self-titled album that broke from the naïveté of his previous work and ventured in more psychedelic and experimental sounds. Following this release came A Misteriosa Luta do Reino de Parassempre Contra o Império de Nuncamais (1969) and Máquina Voadora (1970). Though it did not meet with much success, today Ronnie's experimental work is being rediscovered by a new generation of rock listeners, rendering him a high degree of underground cult status.

== Discography ==
- 1966 – Ronnie Von – Meu Bem
- 1967 – O Novo Ídolo
- 1967 – Ronnie Von nº3
- 1968 – Ronnie Von
- 1969 – A Misteriosa Luta do Reino de Parassempre Contra o Império de Nuncamais
- 1970 – Máquina Voadora
- 1972 – Ronnie Von
- 1973 – Ronnie Von
- 1973 – Ronnie Von
- 1977 – Ronnie Von
- 1977 – Deje mi Vida – in Spanish
- 1978 – Ronnie Von
- 1981 – Sinal dos Tempos
- 1984 – Ronnie Von
- 1987 – Vida e Volta
- 1988 – Ronnie Von
- 1996 – Estrada da Vida
- 2019 – One Night Only
