= Bianca Santana =

Brazilian writer (b. 1984)

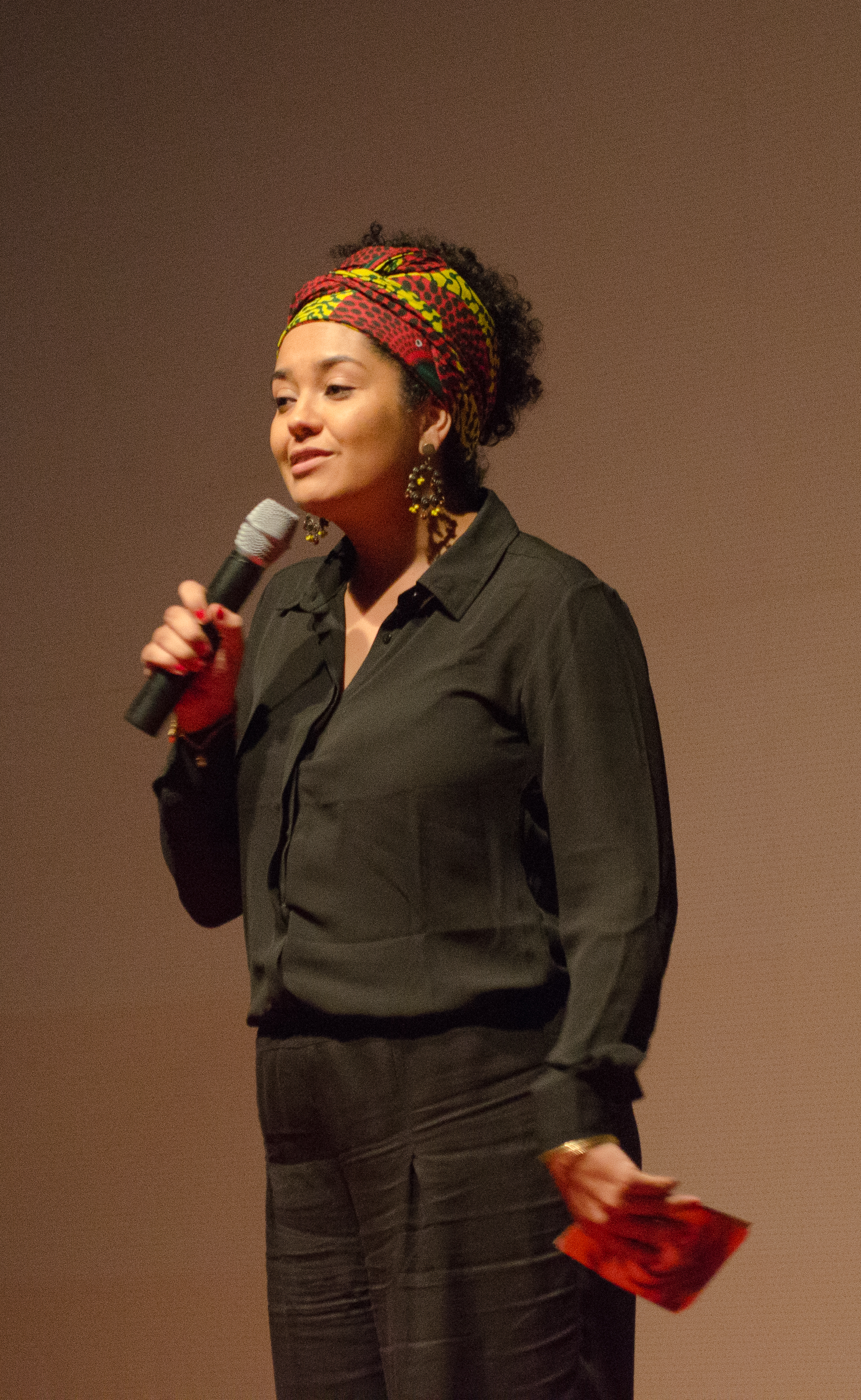
- Born: Bianca Maria Santana de Brito; 1984 (age 41–42); São Paulo
- Education: Master of Education
- Website: biancasantana.info

Bianca Maria Santana de Brito (born 1984) is a Brazilian writer, researcher, journalist, and teacher. In the field of education, she undertook a variety of roles, from teaching to publishing. She authored Quando me descobri negra, a book awarded with a Prêmio Jabuti and made available in public schools across Brazil.

== Education ==
Bianca graduated in journalism at Faculdade Cásper Líbero, where she was a lecturer from 2014 to 2016. She got her master's degree from University of São Paulo in 2011, where she became a Ph.D. candidate in Information Sciences.

== Published works ==
Quando me descobri negra is Bianca's most prestigious work to date and was awarded third place in 2016's Prêmio Jabuti, the illustration category. Bianca's work was selected by the Brazilian government for distribution to public schools across the country. The book explores the experience of black people on the meaning and the consequences of coming to terms with the often veiled racism in Brazil.

She has organized books regarding black women's research and experiences, and the results of her research in open educational resources.

Her journalism was published by Cult Magazine and HuffPost Brazil, amongst others.
