= Clarice Amaral =

Brazilian television presenter (1935–2020)

- Born: October 12, 1935; Arceburgo, Minas Gerais, Brazil
- Died: June 27, 2020 (aged 84); Cunha, São Paulo, Brazil
- Occupation: Television presenter

Clarice José do Amaral, better known as Clarice Amaral (October 12, 1935 — June 27, 2020), was a Brazilian television presenter. Amaral was a pioneer of the television in Brazil, having presented the first Brazilian children's program with audience, Grande Gincana Kibon, on Record, between 1955 and 1969. She also presented the program Clarice Amaral em Desfile, on TV Gazeta, one of the pioneering TV shows of female universe contemporaries, that united home themes, with job market and woman's health. In 1986, after a traumatic assault in her home, Amaral decided to leave the artistic career and change to a little city (Cunha, inland of the state of São Paulo).

== Career ==
Amaral started her career in 1955, at the age of 19, presenting the first live children's program with audience produced in Brazil, Grande Gincana Kibon, on Record, created when the station perceived the strong commercial appeal of children, that had only some series dedicated to themselves, but no audience program. On April 17, Amaral debuted in the program, where she remained for fourteen years, until 1969, when she decided to move on to an adult program. By the program, Amaral was nominated to the 1968 Troféu Imprensa in the category Best Television Animator. In 1969, Amaral debuted on TV Cultura and became presenter of the program São Paulo, Capital Rua Augusta, that showed tourist and gastronomic attractions of the city of São Paulo. In 1970, Amaral signed with TV Gazeta and became presenter of the program Clarice Amaral em Desfile, the pioneering TV show dedicated to the female universe, uniting themes like the woman in the job market, fashion in Brazil with parades of the principal brands and health and beauty topics, being also the first program of the state of São Paulo to be broadcast in color in 1972. After ten years of exhibition, at the age 45, Amaral decided to leave the television, claiming that she did not want to grow old in front of the cameras. In 1981, Amaral passed to present the Programa Clarice Amaral, on Rádio Mulher, remaining for five years.

In 1986, Amaral suffered a traumatic assault in her home, which led her to abandon her artistic career and move to Cunha, a coastal lowland area of São Paulo, deciding to lead an anonymous life away from the spotlight ever since.

== Death ==
Amaral died at age 84, in Cunha, on June 27, 2020.

== Works ==
=== Television ===
Year	Title	Role
1955-69	Grande Gincana Kibon	presenter
1969-70	São Paulo, Capital Rua Augusta	presenter
1970-80	Clarice Amaral em Desfile	presenter

=== Radio ===
Year	Title	Role	Radio station
1981-1986	Programa Clarice Amaral (Clarice Amaral Program)	presenter	Rádio Mulher

== Awards and nominations ==
Year	Award	Category	Result
1968	Troféu Imprensa	Best Woman Presenter	Nominated
