= Rodrigo Rodrigues (TV host) =

Brazilian journalist and musician (1975–2020)

Rodrigo de Oliveira Rodrigues (18 April 1975 — 28 July 2020) was a Brazilian sports journalist, television host, musician and writer.

== Career ==
=== Television ===
Rodrigues was born in Rio de Janeiro, and started his career on TV in 1995, presenting the painting Teentrevista as part of the program Convocação Geral, at the time hosted by Redevida, where he stayed until the end of 1996. In 1997 he attended the UERJ Artistic Education course for Journalism at the Facultade da Cidade, which would become the University Center UniverCidade, now extinct. In the same year, he won a scholarship from the university TV Laboratory to produce and present the program CTV , aired on the campus circuit until the end of 1998.

The following year he moved to Estácio de Sá University, where he presented and produced the program Clip Brasil. He was also editor-in-chief and reporter for Estácio no Ar, elected as the best university news program in the country in the 1999 EXPOCOM. In September of the same year, he started to present the program Caderno U, the weekly communication magazine of UTV, the university channel of Rio de Janeiro.

In 2000 Caderno U, produced by Universidade Gama Filho, became Usina. In the same year and thanks to the program, Rodrigo was invited by the publicist Roberto Medina to join the production of Rock in Rio III, as a producer and reporter for TV Mundo Melhor.

In 2001, he was invited by the journalist and TV critic Gabriel Priolli to be part of the team of Vitrine, a program of TV Cultura, at the time presented by Marcelo Tas. He stayed until 2003; in 2004, he was a reporter for the Cor de Rosa program at SBT, where he participated for the first time in Telethon.

He moved to TV Bandeirantes in 2005, where he acted as a reporter for the program De Olho nas Estrelas, presented by Leão Lobo. In the same year he received an invitation to return to Vitrine, this time as a presenter, alongside Sabrina Parlatore. Also in 2005 he presented Festival Cultura and participated in Telethon for the second time.

In 2006 he was cast by Albino Castro to anchor, alongside Maria Júlia Coutinho, Cultura Meio-Dia at TV Cultura. He left the newspaper in September of the same year, remaining in charge of Vitrine , which he left in December 2010.

On 17 January 2011, he debuted as a presenter for Bate-Bola (second edition) at ESPN Brasil.

In 2014, he signed a contract with TV Gazeta, where he presented Ouça!, a program about music in weekly exhibitions.

In July 2015, he returned to ESPN Brasil to present "Resenha ESPN", a Sunday debate program with names of Brazilian Football. In July 2016, he left ESPN Brasil. In August 2016, he returned again to TV Gazeta, where he presented the program 5 Discos. He also worked at Rádio Globo. In December 2017, he was announced as a new contractor for Esporte Interativo, where he presented a new talk show On 29 January he debuted at the helm of the program De Placa on the channel Esporte Interativo. In December he left Esporte Interativo and on 11 January 2019 he was hired by SporTV. On 27 April he became an occasional presenter for Globo Esporte in São Paulo. and on 27 August he became a presenter of Troca de Passes, on the same channel.

=== Music ===
In 2008 Rodrigo started a band of film soundtracks, The Soundtrackers. The group performed the first show in July 2008 and continued to play at corporate events, private parties and weddings. Once a month The Soundtrackers performed at Na Mata Café, considered the best house with live music in São Paulo. In July 2010, the group released their first live CD / DVD.

=== Literature ===
In 2009, Rodrigues wrote his first book for Ediouro, As Aventuras da Blitz, which tells the story of the group led by Evandro Mesquita, founder of what today is called "Rock Brazil" or "BRock".

In 2012 he published his second book, Almanaque da Música Pop no Cinema, for Leya.

In 2014, he wrote London London, a guide to discover the city of London using the underground. In 2016, he continued this project and wrote Paris Paris aimed at people who want to discover Paris by using the metro.

== Death ==
In mid-July 2020, Rodrigues tested positive for COVID-19 and had to stop his work and isolate at home. On 25 July, two weeks after his diagnosis, he was admitted in a Rio de Janeiro hospital after feeling ill. Clinical examinations revealed cerebral venous thrombosis. He died on 28 July, aged 45. He left a 24-year-old son, whom he had never met. He had also never revealed this to the public, which was made known by the family only after his death.

== Discography ==
With The Soundtrackers

- 2010 - Os Tocadores de Trilhas - Ao Vivo
- 2016 - Os Tocadores de Trilhas: Naked II (EP)
- 2018 - Os Tocadores de Trilhas: Naked III (EP)

== TV work ==
Year	Program	Channel	Position
1995-1996	Convocação Geral	Redevida	Host of Teentrevista
1997-1998	CTV	TV Universitária - circuito interno do campus da UERJ	Producer and host
1998	Clip Brasil	TV Universitária da Universidade Estácio de Sá	Producer and host
1998	Estácio no Ar	TV Universitária da Universidade Estácio de Sá	Editor-in-chief and reporter
1999	Caderno U	UTV, Canal Universitário do Rio de Janeiro	Host
2000	Usina	TV Universitária da Universidade Gama Filho	Host
2000	Rock in Rio	TV Mundo Melhor	Producer and reporter
2001-2003	Vitrine	TV Cultura	Reporter
2004	Cor de Rosa	SBT	Reporter
2004	Telethon	SBT	Participation
2005	De Olho nas Estrelas	Bandeirantes	Reporter
2005	Vitrine	TV Cultura	Host
2005	Festival Cultura	TV Cultura	Host
2005	Telethon	SBT	Participation
2006	Cultura Meio-Dia	TV Cultura	Anchorman
2006-2010	Vitrine	TV Cultura	Host
2011-2014	Bate-Bola (2ª edição)	ESPN Brasil	Host
2014	Ouça!	TV Gazeta	Host
2015-2016	Resenha ESPN	ESPN Brasil	Host
2016	5 Discos	TV Gazeta	Host
2017	De Placa	Esporte Interativo	Host
2019-2020	Troca de Passes	SporTV	Host
2019-2020	Globo Esporte (SP)	Rede Globo	Host
