= Flow chart language =

Programming language

Flow chart language (FCL)
- Paradigm: imperative
- Designed by: Carsten K. Gomard, Neil D. Jones, John Hatcliff
- First appeared: 1989, 1993, 1998

Flow chart language (FCL) is a simple imperative programming language designed for the purposes of explaining fundamental concepts of program analysis and specialization, in particular, partial evaluation. The language was first presented in 1989 by Carsten K. Gomard and Neil D. Jones. It later resurfaced in their book with Peter Sestoft in 1993, and in John Hatcliff's lecture notes in 1998. The below describes FCL as it appeared in John Hatcliff's lecture notes.

FCL is an imperative programming language close to the way a Von Neumann computer executes a program. A program is executed sequentially by following a sequence of commands, while maintaining an implicit state, i.e. the global memory. FCL has no concept of procedures, but does provide conditional and unconditional jumps. FCL lives up to its name as the abstract call-graph of an FCL program is a straightforward flow chart.

An FCL program takes as input a finite series of named values as parameters, and produces a value as a result.

== Syntax ==
We specify the syntax of FCL using Backus–Naur form.

An FCL program is a list of formal parameter declarations, an entry label, and a sequence of basic blocks:

<p> ::= "(" <x>* ")" "(" <l> ")" <b>+

Initially, the language only allows non-negative integer variables.

A basic block consists of a label, a list of assignments, and a jump.

<b> ::= <l> ":" <a>* <j>

An assignment assigns a variable to an expression. An expression is either a constant, a variable, or application of a built-in n-ary operator:

<a> := <x> ":=" <e>
<e> := <c> | <x> | <o> "(" <e>* ")"

Note, variable names occurring throughout the program need not be declared at the top of the program. The variables declared at the top of the program designate arguments to the program.

As values can only be non-negative integers, so can constants. The list of operations in general is irrelevant, so long as they have no side effects, which includes exceptions, e.g. division by 0:

<c> ::= "0" | "1" | "2" | ...
<o> ::= "+" | "-" | "*" | "=" | "<" | ">" | ...

Where =, <, ... have semantics as in C. The semantics of - is such that if x-y<0, then x-y=0.

== Example ==
We write a program that computes the n^{th} Fibonacci number, for n>2:

(n)
(init)

init: x1 = 1
      x2 = 1

fib:  x1 = x1 + x2

      t = x1
      x1 = x2
      x2 = t

      n = -(n 1)

      if >(n 2) then fib else exit

exit: return x2

Where the loop invariant of fib is that x1 is the (i+2-1)^{th} and x2 is the (i+2)^{th} Fibonacci number, where i is the number of times fib has been jumped to.

We can check the correctness of the method for n=4 by presenting the execution trace of the program:

$$\begin{align}
& \left(\mathtt{init},\ \left[ n \mapsto 4,\ x1 \mapsto 0,\ x2 \mapsto 0,\ t \mapsto 0\right]\right) \\
\rightarrow & \left(\mathtt{fib},\ \left[ n \mapsto 4,\ x1 \mapsto 1,\ x2 \mapsto 1,\ t \mapsto 0\right]\right) \\
\rightarrow & \left(\mathtt{fib},\ \left[ n \mapsto 3,\ x1 \mapsto 1,\ x2 \mapsto 2,\ t \mapsto 0\right]\right) \\
\rightarrow & \left(\left\langle\mathtt{halt},\ 3\right\rangle,\ \left[ n \mapsto 2,\ x1 \mapsto 2,\ x2 \mapsto 3,\ t \mapsto 0\right]\right)
\end{align}$$

Where $\left\langle\mathtt{halt},\ v\right\rangle$ marks a final state of the program, with the return value $v$.

== Variants ==
=== Reversible flow chart language ===
Reversible flow chart language (RL) is a simple reversible imperative programming language designed for reversible computing, where each computational process is reversible. RL combines step, test, and assertion in a way that ensures the reversibility of the programs.

RL emphasizes the construction of reversible programs that permit deterministic backward computation, ensuring that no information is lost during processing. This characteristic makes it distinct from traditional flow chart languages, which usually involve irreversible operations. The syntax and example programs for RL would closely resemble traditional flow chart languages but with added constraints to ensure reversibility. These include reversible loops, reversible conditional, and invertibility of atomic computation steps.

Due to the reversibility constraint, RL has less computational power than conventional Turing machines but is equivalent to reversible Turing machines (RTMs), laying the foundation for reversible programming. The reversible variant of the structured program theorem, for instance, can be effectively analyzed using RL, showcasing its significance in the theoretical bases of reversible computing. There is also a structured variant of RL (SRL: structured reversible flow chart language) that combines sequence, selection, and iteration in a way that ensures the reversibility of the programs.
