= Fundação Cásper Líbero =

Brazilian private communication foundation

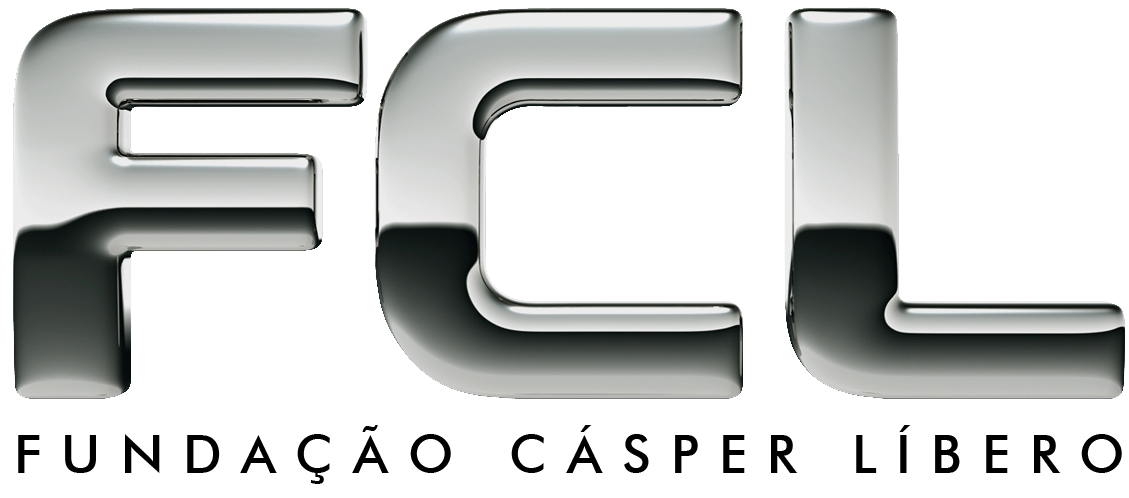
The foundation's logo.

Fundação Cásper Líbero (Cásper Líbero Foundation, also referred to as FCL) is a Brazilian institution that is responsible for a wide communication complex, and is headed in São Paulo. It includes TV Gazeta (TV network), Gazeta AM and Gazeta FM (radio stations, Gazeta Fm is one of the most heard in Brazil), A Gazeta (newspaper), A Gazeta Esportiva (sports website, one of the most viewed in Brazil), GazetaPress (news agency), FCL.net (internet provider), GazetaAdventure.com.br, Faculdade de Comunicação Social Cásper Líbero (which introduced the first journalism college in Latin America), Grupo de Cidadania Empresarial, BestShopTV.com (online store) and Link Interativa.

== History ==
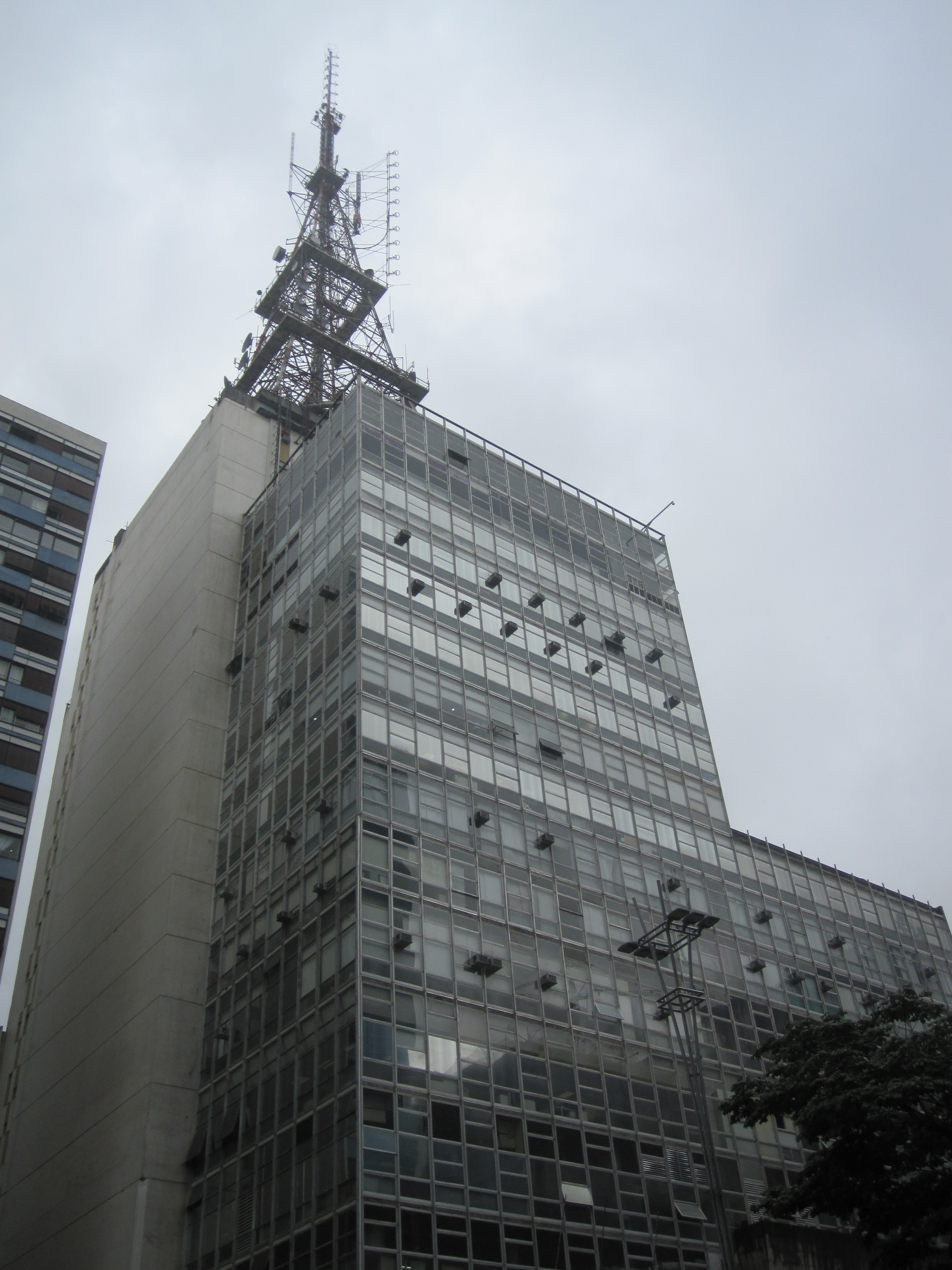
Headquarters of Fundação Cásper Líbero in Paulista Avenue, São Paulo, Brazil.

Fundação Cásper Líbero was created in 1944, after the death of Cásper Líbero (in an airplane crash), an important journalist that was the owner of the newspaper A Gazeta, which was created in 1906. Following his will, the workers decided to create the foundation and the Journalism College, in 1947.
