= Santa Inês =

Santa Inês Maranhão
- Municipality
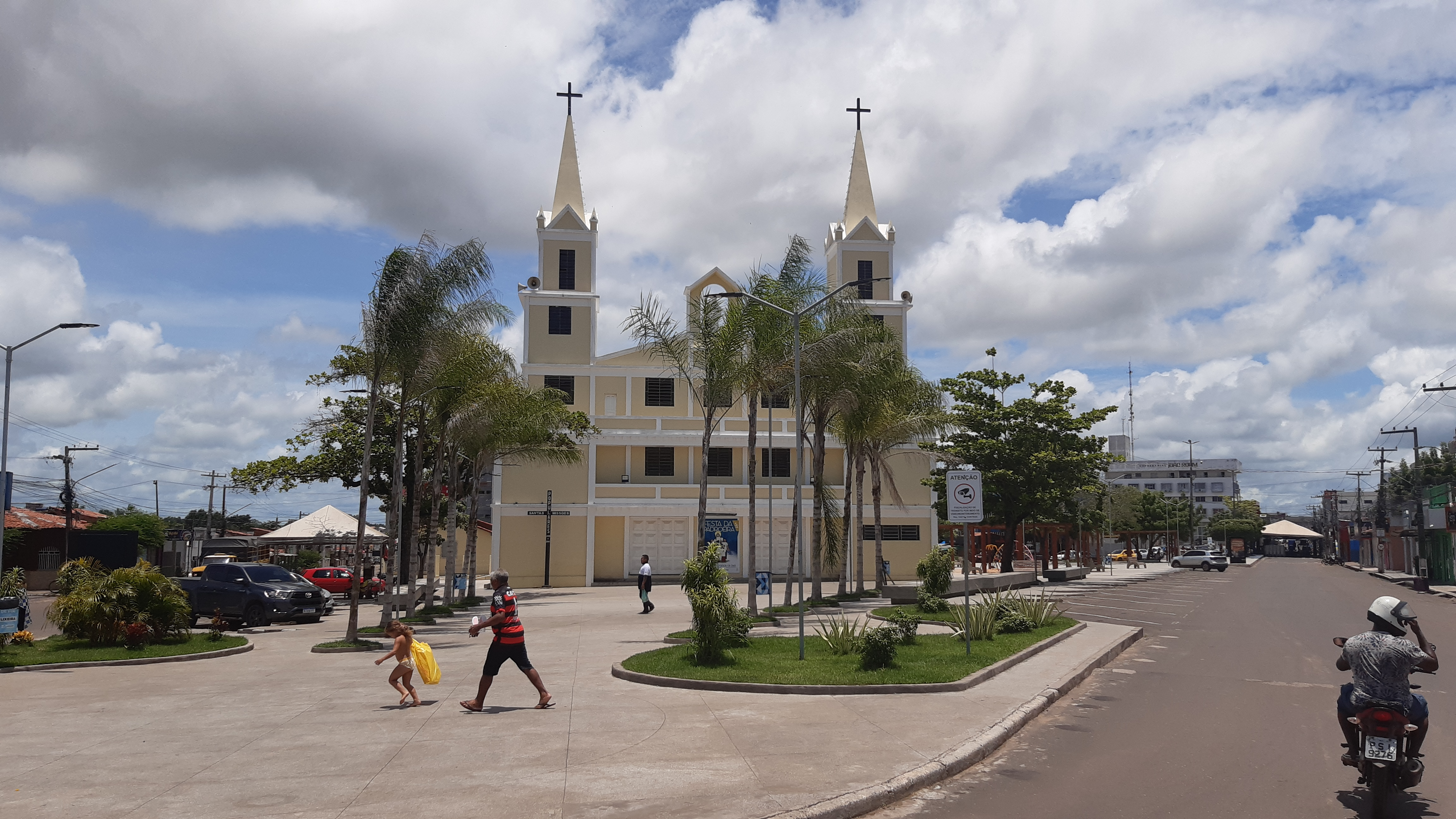
- Praça da Matriz, Santa Inês

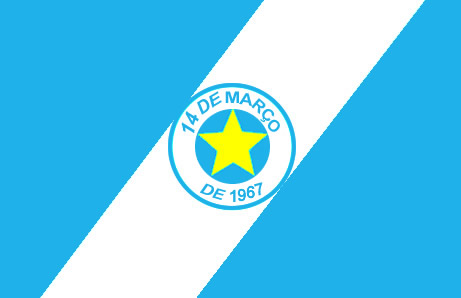
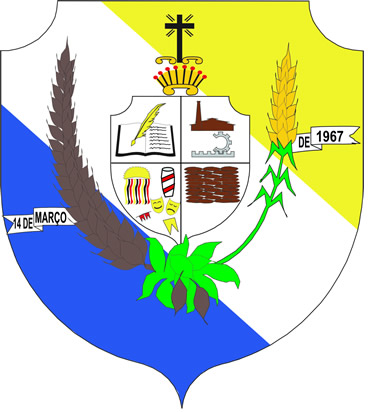
- Flag Coat of arms

- Location in Maranhão

- Location in Brazil
- Coordinates: 3°40′8″S 45°23′2″W
- Country: Brazil
- Region: Nordeste
- State: Maranhão
- Elevation: 79 ft (24 m)

Population (2020)
  - Total: 89,489
- Time zone: UTC−3 (BRT)

Santa Inês is a municipality in the state of Maranhão in the North-East region of Brazil.

The municipality contains a small part of the Baixada Maranhense Environmental Protection Area, a 1,775,035.6-hectare (4,386,208-acre) sustainable use conservation unit created in 1991 that has been a Ramsar Site since 2000. It was emancipated from Pindaré Mirim in 1967.

The city has one of the most important railway stations on the Carajás Railway line.

== Geography ==
The city's climate is tropical with a dry season.

== See also ==
- List of municipalities in Maranhão
