= Faculdade Cásper Líbero =

Coordinates: 23.5654°S 46.6513°W

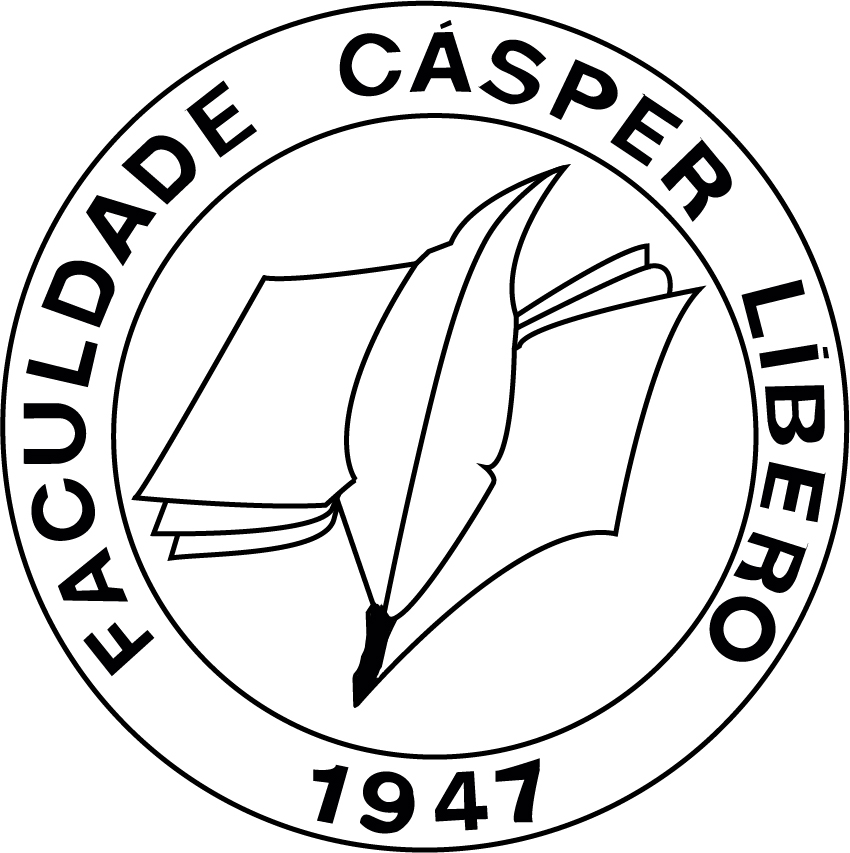
- Type: Private
- Established: May 16, 1947
- President: Welington Andrade
- Location: Av. Paulista, 900, São Paulo, Brazil
- Language: Portuguese
- Website: casperlibero.edu.br

Faculdade Cásper Líbero (FCL) or Cásper Líbero College is a private college in São Paulo, Brazil. Founded in 1947 by Brazilian journalist Cásper Líbero, it is the oldest journalism school in Latin America. The university offers courses on journalism, broadcasting, advertising and public relations. It is located in the Gazeta building at 900 Paulista Avenue.

Faculdade Cásper Líbero also has postgraduate programs at master's and specialization levels, maintains an interdisciplinary research center and promotes the provision of free and university extension courses. Faculdade Cásper Líbero is a leading communications school in Brazil. It ranked as the best private communications school in the country on Folha de S. Paulo's University Ranking.

== History ==
According to the founder, lawyer, journalist and businessman Cásper Líbero, the first school of Journalism in Brazil, Faculdade Cásper Líbero was founded in 1943, but only started operating in 1947, due to legislative and bureaucratic issues. It was the second institution in Latin America to have a journalism course. In 1972, it introduced courses on advertising and public relations. In 2002, it introduced a broadcasting course.

== Admissions ==
All students are admitted through a competitive entrance exam, usually consisting of 90 multiple-choice questions and a written essay. Students may also earn extra points depending on their performance on the ENEM exam.

== Library ==
The José Geraldo Vieira Library opened in 1948, one year after the inauguration of the Journalism school. The collection management system underwent a modernization process in June 2008, making it possible to access online services. With an area of 625 m^{2}, the Library contains a collection of 49,000 books, 580 periodicals, 4,270 films and several online and CD-ROM databases, in addition to having a Documentation and Research Center where you can find the newspaper library, the audiovisual collection, the Gazeta collection of historical newspapers, the collection of books from Cásper Líbero's personal library and other rare materials.

Students have a large historical collection to consult. Several editions of the old Gazeta Esportiva are preserved on site, television materials stored in past formats (Quadruplex videotape, U-matic, Betacam, among others.) and a vast disco with rarities, primarily of Brazilian music.

== Professors ==
- Eugênio Bucci
- José Geraldo Vieira
- Perseu Abramo

== Alumni ==
- Bianca Santana
- Carlos Nascimento
- César Tralli
- Clóvis Rossi
- Clóvis de Barros Filho
- Demian Maia
- Gilberto Dimenstein
- Guga Chacra
- Gugu Liberato
- Maria Inês Nassif
- Maria Julia Coutinho
- Mari Palma
- Mônica Bergamo

== See also ==
- Fundação Cásper Líbero
