= Patati Patatá =

Brazilian children's music duo

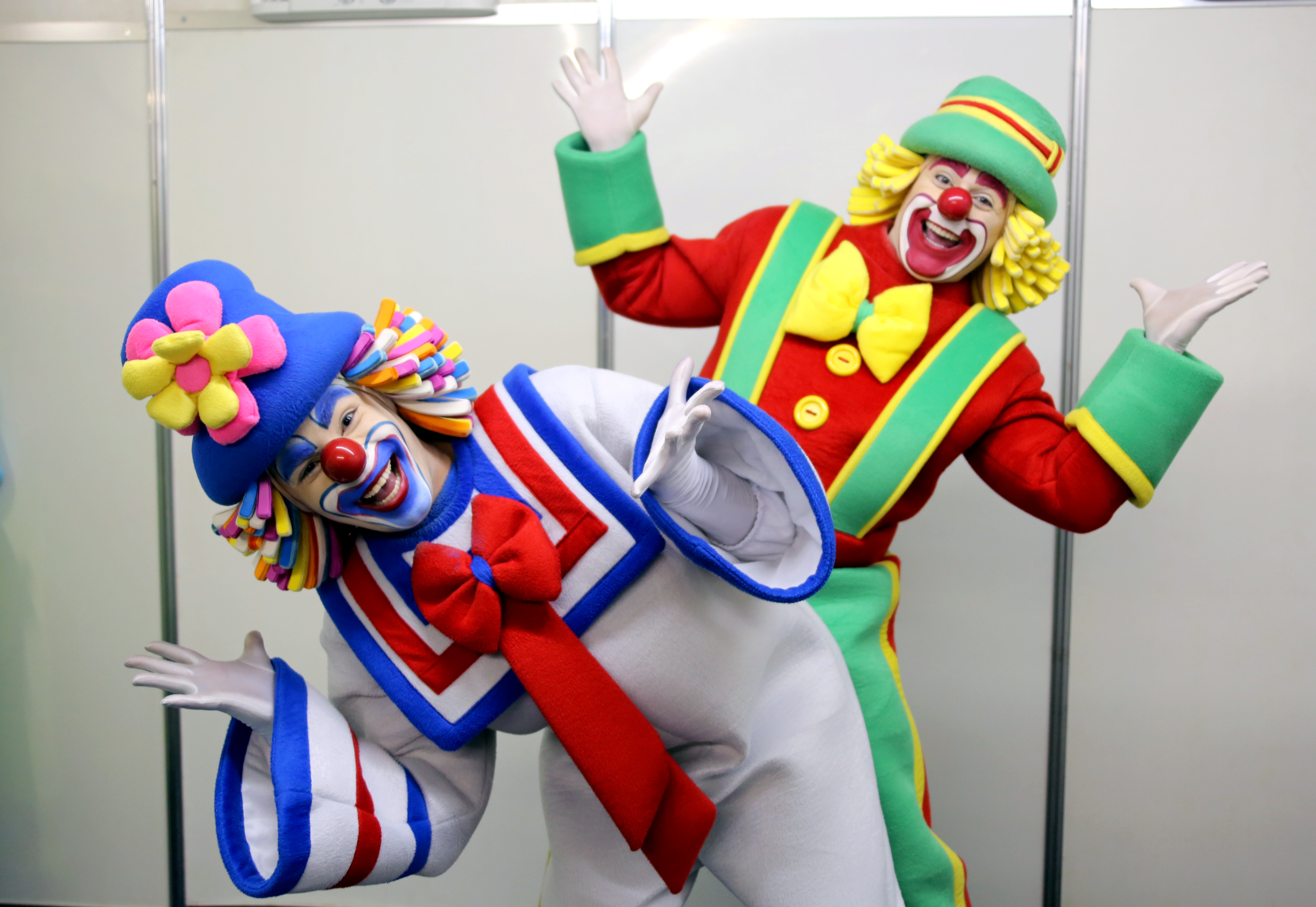
- Patati Patatá in 2016

Background information
- Origin: Brazil
- Genres: Children's music
- Years active: 1983–present
- Labels: Plinta Music (1991-2004); EMI (2004-2010); Som Livre (2010-present); ONErpm (2019-current)
- Members: Wagner Rocha; Henrique Namura; Rinaldi Faria
- Past members: Garota Pupy (deceased); Mágica Alacazam (deceased); Tuti Fruti (deceased); Pirulito (deceased); Ivan Wagner; Márcio Duarte; Binho; Paulo Roberto Teixeira; Junior Silvério Rangel; Flávio Barollo; Rogério Faria
- Website: www.patatipatata.com.br

Patati Patatá are a Brazilian clown duo, with the brand having been active since 1983, and being known throughout Brazil and in some other Latin countries. In 2010, they launched the Brincando com Patati Patatá music collection via Som Livre, which was subsequently certified as a diamond record, with over 300,000 copies sold. In a 2018 interview to the Brazilian TV hostess Eliana, Rinaldi Faria, owner of the Patati Patatá brand, stated that there were then six clown duos actively travelling at the same time. Currently, Wagner Rocha (Patati) and Henrique Namura (Patatá) play the duo.

The duo's debut on television took place in 1995, on the Rinaldi Magic Show program, where they were supporting actors and their creator, Rinaldi was the presenter, but the group's first appearance on television, which is recorded, was in 1991.

The 2010s lead clowns of the duo were also invited to be featured at the Rosas de Ouro samba school's parade with the samba-plot (samba enredo) "Unforgettable", at the 2014 carnival in São Paulo.

The brand Patati Patatá is a registered intellectual property of the company Rinaldi Produções & Publicidade Ltda, belonging to its founder Rinaldi Faria. Rinaldi Produções & Publicidade Ltda is a company specialized in the production and dissemination of events and shows for children, with the main focus on promoting the Patati Patatá characters.

== Background ==
Patati Patatá was a program on the station TVE launched in 1980, reprised by several stations and awarded internationally, in 1983 it was shown on SBT and had three albums released with the name "Turminha Patati Patatá"

Then a group of several artists, Patati Patatá was composed by Garota Pupy, Mágica Alacazam, and clowns Tuti Fruti and Pirulito. They found initial success in 1983 with the album No Reino Encantado dos Animais and in 1984 with the album No Reino Encantado do Circo. Now-manager Rinaldi Faria was a magician and presenter for the group. A car crash in 1985, however, ended up killing three of the group's performers (Tuti Fruti, Pirulito and Garota Pupy); to finish their ongoing tour, Rinaldi and his brother took the place of deceased clowns. The brand then folded its activities.

Rinaldi bought the rights to the Patati Patatá brand in 1989, and started its second iteration, initially replicating the group format. It was soon decided that the focus would be instead on the clown duo, and several DVDs featuring them were released starting from 2003, which progressively drew more attention to their image.

From 2003 to 2006, Paulo Roberto Teixeira and Junior Silvério Rangel played the role of clowns, having recorded the DVDs: No Mundo Encantado, As Histórias Mais Engraçadas da TV and Os Grandes Sucessos, from 2006 to 2009, Flávio Barollo and Rogério Faria interpreted; recorded the DVDs: Na Cidade dos Sonhos and No Castelo da Fantasia.

The duo's breakthrough came with a television debut taking place in 2011, as presenters of the children's program Carrossel Animado broadcast by SBT, shortly after they started to present the program Bom Dia & Companhia on the same station. In 2013, the TV show received a redesign, but ended up being canceled in the same year.

The year of 2014 saw their first international presentations in Europe. In 2015, a new TV show debuted in the Discovery Kids channel, entitled Parque Patati Patatá.

On July 14, 2026, Grupo Patati Patata announced the sale of 50% of the operations of Rede Mais Família to Jovem Pan.

== Discography ==
=== Albums ===
==== Studio albums ====
===== As Turminha Patati Patatá =====
| Year | Title | Label | Formats |
|---|---|---|---|
| 1983 | No Reino Encantado dos Animais | Continental | LP |
| 1984 | No Reino Encantado do Circo | Continental | LP |
| 1986 | Eu Amo os Animais | Continental | LP |

===== As a group =====
| Year | Title | Label | Formats |
|---|---|---|---|
| 1992 | Patati Patatá | Continental | LP |
| 1995 | Patati Patatá | Warner Music | LP and CD |

===== As main artists =====
| Year | Title | Label | Formats |
|---|---|---|---|
| 1996 | Super Sucessos Infantis (Vol. 1) | Plinta Music | CD |
| 2000 | Super Sucessos Infantis (Vol. 2) | Plinta Music | CD |
| 2001 | Super Sucessos Infantis (Vol. 3) | Plinta Music | CD |
| 2002 | Super Sucessos Infantis (Vol. 4) | Rinaldi Music | CD |
| 2003 | Super Sucessos Infantis (Vol. 5) | Rinaldi Music and Plinta Music | CD |
| 2004 | Super Sucessos Infantis (Vol. 6) | Rinaldi Music and Som Livre | CD, VHS, DVD, digital download and streaming |
| 2005 | Na Cidade dos Sonhos (Vol. 7) | Rinaldi Produções and Som Livre | CD, DVD, digital download and streaming |
| 2007 | No Castelo da Fantasia (Vol. 8) | Rinaldi Produções | CD, DVD, digital download and streaming |
| 2010 | Volta ao Mundo (Vol. 10) | Rinaldi Produções | CD, DVD, Blu-ray, digital download and streaming |
| 2012 | Coletânea de Sucessos (Vol. 1) | Som Livre | DVD, CD, Blu-ray, digital download and streaming |
| 2014 | A Vida é Bela | Som Livre and Rinaldi Produções | DVD, CD, Blu-ray, digital download and streaming |
| 2016 | O Melhor da Pré-escola | Som Livre and Rinaldi Produções | Digital download, streaming |
| 2018 | Coletânea de Sucessos (Vol. 2) | Som Livre and Rinaldi Produções | Digital download and streaming |
| 2019 | O Melhor da Pré-Escola (Vol.2) | Rinaldi Produções | Streaming |
| 2020 | O Melhor da Pré-Escola (Vol.3) | Rinaldi Produções | Streaming |

==== Compilation albums ====
| Year | Title | Label | Formats |
|---|---|---|---|
| 2005 | As 100 Mais da Pré-Escola | Rinaldi Music | CD |
| 2006 | Os Grandes Sucessos (Vol. 9) | EMI, Rinaldi Produções and Som Livre | CD, DVD, digital download and streaming |
| 2007 | As 100 Mais da Pré-Escola 2 | Rinaldi Music | CD |
| 2009 | Hora da Folia | Rinaldi Produções | CD |
| 2020 | Hora da Folia Vol.1 (Ao Vivo) | Rinaldi Produções and Som Livre | Digital download and streaming |

==== DVDs of video ====
| Year | Title | Label | Formats |
|---|---|---|---|
| 2006 | As Historias Mais Engraçadas da TV com Patati Patatá | Rinaldi Produções | DVD and streaming |

==== EPs ====
| Year | Title | Label | Formats |
|---|---|---|---|
| 2019 | PP Natal | Som Livre | Digital download and streaming |

==== Box sets ====
| Year | Title | Label | Formats | Sales | Certifications |
|---|---|---|---|---|---|
| 2008 | Patati Patatá - Box Meus Favoritos 1: Edição de Colecionador | EMI | DVD | —N/a | —N/a |
| 2010 | Brincando com Patati e Patatá Vol. 1 | Som Livre | DVD | Brazil: 300,000 | Brazil ABPD: Diamond |
| 2013 | Brincando com Patati Patatá (Vol. 2) | Som Livre | DVD | —N/a | —N/a |

=== Singles ===
| Year | Song | Album |
|---|---|---|
| 2017 | "Amar é" (featuring Thiaguinho) | Non-album single |
| 2019 | "A Dona Aranha" | O Melhor da Pré-Escola (Vol.3) |
| 2019 | "Os Indiozinhos" | O Melhor da Pré-Escola (Vol.3) |
| 2019 | "Chinês" | O Melhor da Pré-Escola (Vol.3) |
| 2019 | "Jacaré Poiô" | O Melhor da Pré-Escola (Vol.3) |
| 2019 | "Ciranda Cirandinha" | O Melhor da Pré-Escola (Vol.3) |
| 2019 | "A Noite Está Tão Linda" | O Melhor da Pré-Escola (Vol.3) |
| 2019 | "Caranguejo Não é Peixe" | O Melhor da Pré-Escola (Vol.3) |
| 2019 | "Noite Feliz" (featuring Tiago Abravanel) | PPNatal |
| 2022 | "Pipoquinha" | Non-album single |
| 2023 | "Amigos Do Peito" | Coletânea de Sucessos (Vol.2) |
| 2023 | "Xô Preguiça" | Coletânea de Sucessos (Vol.2) |
| 2023 | "É Tão Bom" | Coletânea de Sucessos (Vol.2) |
| 2023 | "É Preciso Saber Viver" | Non-album singles |
| 2023 | "Celebrar" | Non-album singles |
| 2024 | "Brilha Brilha Estrelinha'' | O Melhor da Pré-Escola(Vol.4) |

==== As featured artists ====
| Year | Song | Album |
|---|---|---|
| 2011 | "Arca De Noé" (Mara Maravilha featuring Patati Patatá) | Mara Maravilha Para Os Pequeninos Vol.4 |
| 2013 | "Amigos Do Peito" (Atchim & Espirro featuring Patati Patatá) | A Turma Da Casa De Chocolate |
| 2015 | "Amigos Pra Valer" (Bananas in Pyjamas featuring Patati Patatá) | Bananas De Pijamas: O Musical |
| 2019 | "Passa Passa" (Lore Improta featuring Patati Patatá) | Non-album single |
| 2023 | "Festa Maravilhosa" (Thalles Roberto featuring Patati Patatá) | Deixa Vir |

== Secondary characters ==
=== Maluquinhos ===
Maluquinhos do Patati Patatá are characters created to accompany the clown duo in their shows, tours and presentations everywhere. The role of the characters is to act as stagehands and dancers.
