= TV Gazeta =

Brazilian broadcast television network

- Logo used since 2026
- Type: Broadcast television network
- Country: Brazil
- Headquarters: São Paulo, Brazil

Programming
- Picture format: HDTV 1080i

Ownership
- Owner: Fundação Cásper Líbero

History
- Launched: January 25, 1970
- Former names: CNT Gazeta

Links
- Website: www.tvgazeta.com.br

Availability

Terrestrial
- Digital terrestrial television: 17 UHF (São Paulo)

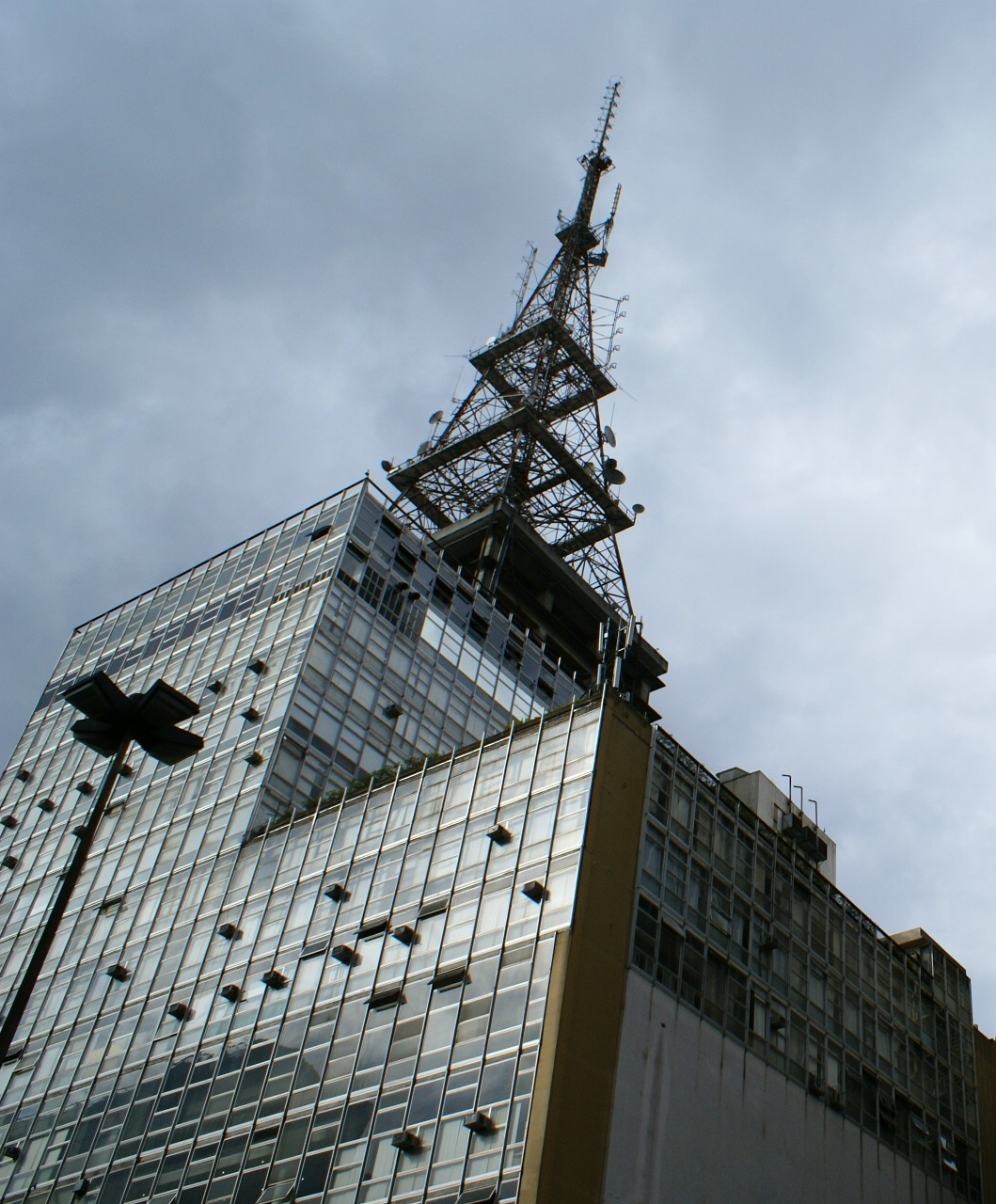
Headquarters of Gazeta TV in São Paulo

Rede Gazeta (Portuguese pronunciation: [ˈʁedʒi ɡaˈzetɐ]), also known as TV Gazeta or only Gazeta (in English, Gazette Network), is a Brazilian television network based in São Paulo.

== History ==
The history of TV Gazeta is intertwined with the history of television in Brazil. Planned since the 1950s, its facilities were oversized. On January 15, 1952, by decree signed by President Getúlio Vargas, channel 2 in São Paulo was granted to the Fundação Cásper Libero (Cásper Líbero Foundation). Due to delays in the inauguration due to technical issues, the Cásper Líbero Foundation lost the concession for channel 2, which was passed on to Assis Chateaubriand, who inaugurated TV Cultura a year later. The concession for channel 11 was given to TV Gazeta. In 1961, the last act of the Juscelino Kubitschek administration was to take the channel away from the Foundation and give it to TV Continental in Rio de Janeiro. One day later, with the inauguration of Jânio Quadros and pressure from the Foundation, the concession returned to its rightful owner.

June 23, 1969, was the deadline for installing São Paulo's seventh and final VHF channel. At 5:45 p.m., the 116-meter tower at the end of Paulista Avenue transmitted its first signals, and TV Gazeta went on the air experimentally. The first image was of Paulista Avenue, accompanied by the song Sá Marina, by Antônio Adolfo and Tibério Gaspar, sung by Wilson Simonal.

TV Gazeta was inaugurated on January 25, 1970, the 416th anniversary of the city of São Paulo, with live images of Paulista Avenue and a commemorative text evoking Cásper Líbero, the station's patron. The first station set up with equipment for color broadcasting, it had the first unit for external color broadcasting in the country.

It was the first station to work with chroma key equipment and introduced slow motion to Brazil, anticipating trends by producing and broadcasting the country's first Formula 1 race (rebroadcast in partnership with Rede Globo).

Gazeta nurtured the dream of becoming a network in the mid-1970s, when the market began to change. Tupi and Record were in decline, Rede Bandeirantes was considering the possibility of becoming a network, while Globo was always competing for audience share.

There was the possibility of the emergence of Rede Jornal do Brasil, but this did not worry Gazeta much, which even put programming on stations in the northern region of the country, in much of the state of São Paulo, and took for granted the concession of channel 11 in Rio de Janeiro. But that's not how the story unfolded. In 1976, broadcaster and presenter Silvio Santos won the concession for the Rio de Janeiro channel that belonged to TVS (TV Studios Silvio Santos de Cinema e Televisão Ltda), (which later became the cornerstone of the future SBT), and Bandeirantes made better offers and took the stations that Gazeta had affiliated in the Amazon region to its network. Over time, the station's equipment began to be scrapped, there was not enough money to replace it, many professionals began to change stations, the audience began to watch less and less programming, and Gazeta entered a phase of ostracism that would last until the mid-1980s. Many people were even unaware that channel 11 in São Paulo was on the air.

But it is important to remember an unforgettable event involving TV Gazeta in 1973: an agreement had been reached between the Argentine Federal Government, under Perón, and the Brazilian Government, establishing that Brazilian television technicians would implement color television in Argentina, meaning that the first color broadcast would be under their care. It was the OTI party (at the Teatro Colón in Buenos Aires). The Brazilian government assigned the team from TV Gazeta, channel 11 in São Paulo, to this task. Rede Tupi simultaneously broadcast the event—even though it was entirely organized by Gazeta—with special flashes of the rehearsals and the show during the live broadcast from Argentina to Brazil via satellite. An emotional moment of the day was when the Gazeta team gave permission for the local professionals to end that first broadcast in Argentine style. Many Argentines hugged the Argentine and Brazilian technicians, and there was constant crying among all the operators, moved by emotion.

In 1978, Gazeta debuted the Japanese-Brazilian program Programa Nelson Matsuda, an paid presentation program by Japan Pop Show Empreendimentos or N.Matsuda TV Produções Ltda. It was broadcast live from the Cásper Líbero Theater on the third floor of the Gazeta building. It was hosted by Nelson Matsuda himself. It was the first Japanese-Brazilian variety show with an audience, thus inaugurating Gazeta's line of shows, which were broadcast in the morning, afternoon, or evening. It was hosted by Rosa Miyake, Mário Okuhara, Ênio Santos, Humberto Marçal, and Alberto Murata. The program mixed information, culture, and entertainment. It featured events from Japan, Miss Nikkei, talent contests, musicals with Brazilians and Japanese, etc.

In 1978, the network even began filming a novela called Zulmira, in an attempt to capitalize on the genre. However, the novela was censored before it premiered due to the appearance of a toilet in one scene.

On September 22, 1980, Clarisse Amaral em Desfile became Mulheres. Initially, the program was hosted by Ângela Rodrigues Alves and Ione Borges. Then, the whole of Brazil began to get to know the duo of “partners,” Ione Borges and Claudete Troiano.

In 1982, reporter and columnist Amaury Jr. made his debut on the network, interviewing famous people and celebrities in São Paulo and other Brazilian cities on the program Flash. The program was so successful that other networks competed for Gazeta's new revelation, until Rede Bandeirantes negotiated a higher salary than Amaury was earning at Gazeta and he left the station in 1986.

In 1983, to make matters worse for TV Gazeta, a major competitor entered the fray: Rede Manchete, channel 9, which, despite not being as big as the others, had plenty of resources, unlike Gazeta. Therefore, it seemed doomed to fall into oblivion once again. TV Gazeta, together with TV Globo, built and inaugurated the Cásper Líbero Tower on April 21, at Avenida Paulista, 900, 13th floor, Bela Vista, in São Paulo.

Also in 1983, TV Gazeta designed a program that could bring the Brazilian circus world to television. Thus, Wandeko Pipoka created, presented, hosted, and conceived the children's program A Turma da Pipoca.

Also in 1983, the future clown duo Atchim & Espirro, played by artists Eduardo dos Reis and Carlos Alberto de Oliveira, appeared in the comedy sketches of the children's program A Turma da Pipoca, created, presented, directed, and conceived by Wandeko Pipoka. Eduardo dos Reis already had a stage name: the clown Atchim. Carlos Alberto de Oliveira, the clown Espirro, with his son, Carlos Júnior, had another name: Janela and Janelinha. Later, only Atchim and Janela remained. Janela, Carlos' character, was renamed Espirro. The duo became known as Atchim & Espirro. However, Wandeko Pipoka had a falling out with Gazeta's management and left the station. Later, in 1985, management handed the duo the continuation of the program A Turma do Pipoca, and thus Brincando na Paulista was born. The duo Atchim & Espirro debuted on the network hosting the children's show Brincando na Paulista. The program aired from 1985 to 1988. The program mixed Hanna-Barbera cartoons, music, raffles, games, musicals, comedy sketches, and attractions for children.

Between 1984 and 1985, the station partnered with Grupo Abril, which had decided to enter the television market. Since the government did not grant a concession to the publisher, Abril Vídeo emerged, buying practically all of Gazeta's nighttime programming, which, presenting quality programs, began to be watched again. Even after Abril left, Gazeta continued to have a reasonable audience, but maintaining truly competitive programming, in line with other networks, was risky and unfeasible. Fausto Silva debuted his Perdidos na Noite (Lost in the Night).

With the debut of Imagens do Japão (Images of Japan) in 1978 or 1979, Nelson's show lost some of its importance at Gazeta and ended up going off the air in 1984.

In 1988, Gazeta debuted the new format of the Nelson Matsuda Program, now under the name Japan Pop Show. Japan Pop Show was modeled after Imagens do Japão. It was a live studio audience program in the format of variety and musical shows, broadcast live from the Cásper Líbero Theater on the 3rd floor of the Gazeta building. Japan Pop Show was an independent production by Japan Pop Show Empreendimentos or N.Matsuda TV Produções Ltda. It was hosted by Nelson Matsuda and Suzana Matsuda until 1992 or 1994, when the program returned to Rede Bandeirantes.

In 1990, due to internal changes, the “televisão desindexada (deindexed television)” project, as it was called, ended up being deactivated, and TV Gazeta began to decline, with a more lackluster programming schedule based mainly on films that were repurchased directly from Rede Globo and shown on Cine Gazeta from Monday to Saturday at 9:30 p.m., and cartoons on the Gazetinha program from Monday to Saturday from 8:00 p.m. to 9:30 p.m., with some cartoons repurchased from SBT and Globo itself, when it no longer had room to show them. The station seemed doomed to continue broadcasting only to São Paulo, with little prospect for growth.

In the early 1990s, a new phase of change began for the station, with the start of a partnership between Rede OM Brasil (Organizações Martinez) and TV Gazeta de São Paulo. The turnaround occurred precisely at the beginning of 1992, when TV Paraná (in Curitiba) and TV Tropical (in Londrina) decided to break their contract with Rede Bandeirantes, which was in a phase of rapid expansion, and thus Rede OM was founded. Gaining affiliates across the country (thanks to then-President Collor, with whom the network owner was a political ally), OM soon began to convince Gazeta of the possibility of affiliation, which was very well received at first.

These were times of rapid growth; the new network had Galvão Bueno on its staff and was the great promise for the decade, with films, studio shows, journalism, and sports, such as the broadcast of the 1992 Copa Libertadores de América, when the channel was the audience leader in broadcasting the final between São Paulo and Newell's Old Boys. In the middle of the year, everyone was betting that TV Gazeta would be to the 1990s what SBT had been to the 1980s. However, Collor was accused of corruption and impeached.

In 1993, Rede OM Brasil became CNT and never grew as before, as Rede Record began to grow again and ended up taking a large part of its affiliates. This was followed by a period of joint operation with CNT. During the decade, it was recognized that most of the programs that were made at the São Paulo station and broadcast on the network were responsible for the largest audiences and, consequently, the highest revenues. TV Gazeta realized that it could stand on its own two feet and start growing again.

The Japan Pop Show program went off the air on TV Gazeta and returned to Rede Bandeirantes.

TV Gazeta suffered another setback, losing the concession for channel 12 in Santos, a station on the coast of São Paulo that it had tried to operate twice. The concession, dating from the 1970s, had expired.

In 1996, TV Gazeta changed its name to CNT Gazeta.

During that decade, CNT and Gazeta broadcast foreign soap operas, audience-oriented programs—such as the popular police shows Cadeia and 190 Urgente, the children's programs Hugo Game, Tudo por Brinquedo, with Mariane Dombrova, and TV Fofão, with Orival Pessini, as well as Hanna-Barbera cartoons, the sports program Mesa Redonda, the variety show Mulheres, with a strong presence in journalism and sports.

The partnership between CNT and Gazeta ended in June 2000, when Gazeta did not renew the contract, leaving Greater São Paulo and several municipalities without CNT's signal until 2001. As a result, TV Gazeta began its network process, with the implementation of repeaters in the interior of São Paulo and in other states. By 2000, TV Gazeta had stopped showing the films, soap operas, series, and cartoons that had been shown during the CNT partnership. On the other hand, programs such as Mesa Redonda, Mulheres, and others responsible for the audience ratings of the two broadcasters remained on Gazeta.

On July 16, 2001, TV Gazeta and the newspaper Gazeta Mercantil joined forces to create the station's new television journalism, which now, in addition to sports and Em Questão (with Maria Lydia Flândoli), incorporates the Primeira Página, Mercado, and Jornal da Gazeta news programs into its programming schedule, which successfully launched journalism on that day. All of the station's news programs were revamped, even Gazeta Esportiva.

Jornal da Gazeta debuted with live coverage from the Argentine capital of Buenos Aires, as the Argentine economic crisis was reaching its peak at that time. Carlos Alberto Sardenberg, Gustavo Camargo, and Camila Teich hosted the first edition of Jornal da Gazeta, with Maria Lídia as a guest. Thus, the two faces of TV Gazeta, the new and the old, came together to relaunch the station's news programming under the direction of former TJ Brasil director Albino Castro.

In the first half of 2001, the station's entertainment programming also underwent changes: the music program Clipper went on the air, and Clodovil and Christina Rocha took over the program Mulheres.

Mulheres is TV Gazeta's most traditional program, along with Em Questão and Mesa Redonda. Mulheres began with Clarisse Amaral under the name Programa Clarisse Amaral. With the arrival of Ione Borges, head of the fashion department at Mappin stores, alongside Clarisse, the program was renamed Clarisse Amaral em Desfile. After the presenter left, the program continued with Ione, now alongside radio announcer Claudete Troiano, giving rise to the “partners” of the program Mulheres em Desfile. With the separation of the duo in the late 1990s, Claudete changed stations and Ione presented the program Pra Você in 2001 (at the time Pra Você began, Ione presented this program while Mulheres was left solely to Claudete). Claudete Troiano presented Note e Anote on Rede Record, and Ione Borges only her eponymous studio program. From then on, Márcia Goldschmidt and Leão Lobo replaced Claudete and the program continued. Over the years, its programming was reformulated, adapting to the demands of the public and advertisers to meet the dynamics of modern television.

However, with the end of the partnership with CNT, part of the programming began to be filled with so-called infomercials.

Since 2006, the São Paulo-based broadcaster has been seeking to revamp its programming schedule with news, entertainment, and commercial programs. The first step was the December debut of BestShop TV, a teleshopping program hosted by Viviane Romanelli, Fernando Fernandez, Carol Minhoto, Pâmela Domingues, Claudia Pacheco, Thiago Oliveira, Paloma Silva, and Regiane Tápias. In 2007, two other in-house productions debuted: Super Ofertas (which provides space for small and medium-sized advertisers) and Papo de Amigos, hosted by Amanda Françozo.

In 2009, presenter Claudete Troiano returned to the station that launched her career after more than 10 years presenting programs on stations such as Rede Manchete, Rede Record, and SBT. She hosted Manhã Gazeta, a morning electronic magazine program, alongside Ione Borges. Initially, the program was divided into two parts, with Claudete presenting one and Ione the other. With the departure of Ione Borges, the station hired Olga Bongiovani to replace her, who stayed for a short time. Since then, Claudete has presented Manhã Gazeta alone.

With the desire to expand its programming schedule, Gazeta ended the BestShopTV teleshopping program, with the show's cast being used in new in-house productions.

After eight years without any major premieres, in June 2010, the station launched Super Esporte, presented by Thiago Oliveira at 10:00 p.m. In October 2010, the station made room for the premiere of three more women's programs: Você Bonita from Monday to Friday at 8:30 a.m. with Carol Minhoto, Falando sobre sexo in the early hours of Saturday morning with psychologist Carla Cecarello, and on Saturday mornings, Mix Mulher with Regiane Tápias.

In 2010, in celebration of TV Gazeta's 40th anniversary, the station aired specials about the channel's history. Journalist Elmo Francfort launched the book “Av. Paulista 900 - A História da TV Gazeta” (Av. Paulista 900 - The History of TV Gazeta), the same author who wrote the book about Rede Manchete.

Another event that caused a stir was the controversial departure of Palmirinha Onofre from Gazeta. The chef, who hosted TV Culinária for years, became famous for the hilarious scenes that were shown on Rede Bandeirantes' Top Five do Custe o Que Custar (CQC) program. TV Culinária was revamped and gained a new host, Viviane Romanelli.

In 2011, presenter Luisa Mell returned to TV with the program Estação Pet, which went off the air due to low financial returns. During the same period, TV Culinária also went off the air due to low audience acceptance of the new presenter. In its place, the station aired Delícias do Chef with Chef Allan Villa Espejo, which until then had only been a segment on Manhã Gazeta.

In February 2011, director Márcio Tavolari was hired by the station to artistically revamp the program Todo Seu, TV Gazeta's first program to debut in HD in celebration of the 1,500th edition of the nighttime show hosted by Ronnie Von. Todo Seu became the first daily HD electronic magazine on Brazilian television in prime time, with new segments and a more refined aesthetic. Ronnie Von was back in the media spotlight with praise from critics, and the program gained prestige among artists and the public.

After more than 20 years at Gazeta, journalist Maria Lydia Flândoli was fired without much explanation. Em Questão goes off the air and Jornal da Gazeta is revamped, bringing in the duo Stella Gontijo and Gabriel Cruz. Shortly thereafter, Maria Lydia returns to the newscast, conducting interviews.

In the same year, Gazeta invested in rerunning some of its programs during the early hours of the morning. The programs Todo Seu, Jornal da Gazeta, Estação Pet and Vambora (part of the Mulheres program) were rerun.

In early 2012, TV Culinária returned, this time with Regiane Tápias at the helm and the programs Os Impedidos (a comedy show aired on Sunday nights before Mesa Redonda), Hoje Tem (a cultural events program aired on Thursdays, hosted by Pâmela Domingues), and A Máquina (a talk show hosted by Fabrício Carpinejar, aired on Tuesday nights).

In April, presenter Claudete Troiano leaves Gazeta, and Revista da Cidade with Regiane Tápias debuts in place of Manhã Gazeta, with the segment Ateliê na TV being spun off from the program to become a program in its own right. During the same period, Super Esporte changed its time slot to 12:00 p.m., with Você Bonita airing immediately after. Jornal da Gazeta - Edição das 10, a 30-minute news program, premiered at 10:00 p.m.

With the end of the partnership with BestShop TV, the programs Gazeta Imóveis, Gazeta Motors and Gazeta Shopping gained more space in the programming.

De Olho na TV (Eye on TV) is the most successful segment on Todo Seu, where Jovem Pan journalist José Armando Vanucci comments on the main topics on Brazilian TV. Due to its success, the segment, which was only aired on Wednesdays, gained two more days of airtime, on Mondays and Fridays. In addition, Vanucci now shows behind-the-scenes footage of TV shows and interviews.

With digital and analog satellite broadcasting, TV Gazeta's programming is now available on the NET and Vivo TV pay TV systems. This station did not benefit from the new pay TV law because it did not meet the necessary requirements.

On November 1, 2013, the station fired the host of “Super Esporte,” Thiago Oliveira, without further explanation, and he immediately signed with Rede Globo. Since November 4, the show has been hosted by Anita Paschkes, who had previously replaced Michelle Gianella, who was on maternity leave, on “Gazeta Esportiva” and “Mesa Redonda.”

In 2014, TV Gazeta made changes to its programming. New programs were created and dedicated to the city and state of São Paulo. Gazeta was once known as the TV station that represented São Paulo and was the most São Paulo-centric of all TV stations.

The programs Ateliê na TV, Revista da Cidade, Super Esporte, Você Bonita, Mulheres, Gazeta Esportiva, Todo Seu and others were kept, but now with a new graphic package.

The new programming debuted on March 10. In the same year, claiming to be renewing its sports team, the station fired commentator Fernando Solera and on June 1st premiered the comedy show Chuchu Beleza, with Felipe Xavier. Series were produced, consisting of four episodes each, always dealing with the theme of São Paulo, including Amor Concreto, Extremos da Cidade, and A Cidade que não Dorme.

In the middle of the year, a new production center was set up to create exclusive content for the internet. Several behind-the-scenes videos were produced for TV programs and series such as Mamma Responde. The videos are hosted by presenter Paula Vilhena.

In 2015, TV Gazeta is promoting drastic changes in its programming. The broadcaster has updated its bumpers and idents with a graphic standard designed entirely in flat design, with simple elements, flat shapes, and solid colors. "As part of the proposal for continuous evolution and seeking even greater proximity to the audience, the package of new finishes focuses on the ‘sensations’ that TV Gazeta's programming, in its different editorial sections and programs, brings to the viewer. To translate these sensations, a color palette was developed that resulted in an even more vibrant, fun, and modern look," says Denise Wuilleumier, Social Communication Manager at Fundação Cásper Líbero.

Gazeta's journalism department made some important hires: Rodolpho Gamberini debuted alongside Stella Gontijo on the new Jornal da Gazeta. Josias de Souza and Denise Campos de Toledo were hired as new commentators. The new programming debuted on March 2, 2015.

In 2016, TV Gazeta invested in the launch of new series. Among them were Projeto 1 Dia (Project 1 Day), which depicts a day somewhere in São Paulo; Humor.Docs, which provides an overview of humor on a wide range of platforms, presented by Paula Vilhena; and Histórias do Rap Nacional (Stories of National Rap), which takes stock of the history of Brazilian rap, presented by Ronald Rios, a former reporter for CQC. Rios was hired by the station on October 29, 2015. On March 11, the program A Semana (The Week) premiered, which covered the events of the past week in a relaxed manner. The program went off the air in July after disagreements between the comedian and TV Gazeta. On March 9, the reality show “Sobremesa Para Dois” (Dessert for Two) premieres with Paula Vilhena, in which two contestants with or without cooking experience will be challenged to prepare a dish and try to win over their suitor through taste. On May 4, A noite convida (The Night Invites) premieres, in which the host explores São Paulo's nightlife with two personalities.

On July 25, after 15 years, the network fired presenter Mamma Bruschetta after she received an irresistible offer from SBT. She was replaced by actor Guilherme Uzeda, who plays the character Tia. On July 30, Leão Lobo also left the network to join Mamma Bruschetta at SBT. In his place, the station hired journalist Gabriel Perline. To strengthen Mulheres, the station rehired Fernando Oliveira, known as Fefito, and also brought in columnist José Armando Vannucci.

On August 1, the station rehired Rodrigo Rodrigues to host the program 5 Discos, in which he will receive a guest who will bring the five most important albums of their life. On August 23, 2016, reporter and journalist Goulart de Andrade, who had been with TV Gazeta since 2012, passed away. The station kept the interviews recorded by the reporter, with the first posthumous report airing on September 11, 2016.

On October 17, the station discontinued its youth programming, eliminating the shows A Máquina, Hoje Tem, Cidade Ocupada, A Noite Convida and 5 Discos.

On March 6, 2017, Cozinha Amiga (Friendly Kitchen) returns, but now each day a chef presents easy recipes for everyday life. On April 24, the station announces the dismissal of Anna Paola Fragni after 21 years at the station working on all programs, as well as Michelle Francine, host of Gazeta Shopping. On May 16, sports team referee commentator Oscar Roberto Godói was fired from the station. On June 27, the station announced that former player and commentator Müller would be joining the Mesa Redonda program.

On July 3, the station announced the hiring of Father Alessandro Campos to host a Sunday auditorium program. The following day, July 4, the station ceased to be retransmitted via satellite, through the satellite dish signal, in order to reduce financial expenses, and on July 21, the station announced that it had also not renewed its contract with TV Ultrafarma for the assignment of programming slots.

On August 1, 2017, presenter Anita Paschkes left the channel after four years. On August 6, Festa Sertaneja with Father Alessandro Campos premiered, initially on Sundays and later moved to Fridays.

On September 3, the Sunday beauty program Sempre Bela (Always Beautiful) premiered, hosted by hairstylist Sylvio Rezende.

On November 10, Gazeta fired 40 employees and outsourced the production of Gazeta Shopping. On December 11, the end of Festa Sertaneja, a program hosted by Father Alessandro Campos, was announced.

On December 12, Cátia Fonseca left the program Mulheres after 15 years, transferring to Rede Bandeirantes. On the 15th of the same month, the station announced the purchase of exclusive rights on open TV for the 2018 season of the LBF.

In January 2018, the Mulheres program has a new host: Regina Volpato, who replaced Cátia Fonseca during her vacation, is now permanent in the role.

In February, Rinaldi Faria, Patati & Patatá's manager, was confirmed to host a daily program in the early hours of the morning on the channel.

On February 1, 2018, in addition to São Paulo, TV Gazeta's signal began to be broadcast by the operator NET in the cities of Brasília and Rio de Janeiro. On March 30, the station stopped airing the program Vitrine do Artesanato na TV. A few days later, Juliana Verboonen also left the station, where she was part of the journalism department. In November, Gazeta practically eliminated journalism, firing 80% of its employees.

On December 8, the station began broadcasting the Superliga 2018/2019 games, but stopped showing them on January 20, 2019, due to conflicting dates and times. Only the men's games were broadcast. In addition, the station did not renew its LBF broadcasting rights.

In March 2019, Laerte Vieira was rehired by Gazeta to anchor Jornal da Gazeta alongside Luciana Magalhães.

On April 1, TV Gazeta's new programming schedule premieres, with the debut of the program De A a Zuca, with Celso Zucatelli, and new features on the station's programs, such as Você Bonita, Revista da Cidade, Todo Seu, Mulheres and Cozinha Amiga. The programs hosted by Regiane Tápias and Ronnie Von get new sets, new idents, new visual packages, and changes in their segments. However, Gazeta News, a mini-news program that aired in the late afternoon, was discontinued. On April 14, the station re-aired Desafio ao Galo, a Várzea soccer tournament that made TV history. However, the broadcasts ended on July 21 and were later transferred to RBTV. On April 22, Maria Lydia Flândoli left Jornal da Gazeta and the station after more than 20 years. In June, Tássia Sena also left Gazeta journalism to become a reporter for TV Globo São Paulo. On July 19, the cancellation of two successful programs was announced: Todo Seu, anchored for over 15 years by Ronnie Von, and De A a Zuca, which had been on the air since April, hosted by Celso Zucatelli. Both presenters were dismissed from the station. In their place, reruns of Você Bonita, Cozinha Amiga, and Mulheres will be aired. On September 4, the premiere of Faça Você Mesmo, with Rogério Chiaravelli, was announced for the 9th, with information and tips on crafts.

On March 8, 2020, after completing 50 years on the air, Gazeta changed its sets, idents, visual packages, graphics, and made changes to its programs. Gazeta also debuted its new slogan: TV Gazeta, você por perto. Tudo certo! and its new ident. However, due to the COVID-19 pandemic, the broadcaster took several safety, prevention, and hygiene measures in its studios and also made adjustments to its programming schedule, including the suspension of programs such as Revista da Cidade, which gave way to Gazeta Shopping and Faça Você Mesmo, as well as Gazeta Esportiva, which gave way to Plantão da Saúde, which provides updates on the pandemic situation in the state, the country, and the world. The following day, the broadcaster premiered the program Fofoca Aí, hosted by Fefito, Tutu (Artur Pires), Tia (Guilherme Uzeda), and Gabriel Perline, contributors to the programs Mulheres and Revista da Cidade.

On June 14, it was announced that the program Faça Você Mesmo had left the station's programming. Plantão da Saúde lasted until July 3, when the station ended the program and returned Gazeta Esportiva on July 6.

On July 12, the station returned with Mesa Redonda. On August 3, the program Revista da Cidade returned, renamed Revista da Manhã. On August 30, the music program Modão do Brasil premiered, presented by Alysson and João Reis, father of singers Felipe Araújo and Cristiano Araújo. On August 4, the station relaunched Ateliê na TV, with Dotan Mayo. On November 30, Jornal do Bóris premiered, simultaneously on YouTube, hosted by Boris Casoy.

On January 6, 2022, it was announced that the programs Fofoca Aí and Cozinha Amiga would go off the air on the 21st, causing changes in the programming, with the increase in the duration of Revista da Manhã, Você Bonita, and Mulheres, which returned to a 4-hour duration. In February 2023, the station did not renew the contract of journalist Flávio Prado, who left Mesa Redonda after 20 years.

Months later, journalists Celso Cardoso, Leão Lobo, and Regina Volpato also left the station, the latter due to a decision by Gazeta's parent company to reduce salaries by 20% as it faces a serious financial crisis. On June 30, after 11 years, the station announced the end of Revista da Cidade, the morning program that opened Gazeta's own programming schedule. Starting on July 3, the time slot will be filled by programming from the Universal Church of the Kingdom of God, which will dominate the station's morning programming and a large part of its daily programming, since the church already rents the time slots from 8 p.m. to 2 a.m. As for the team, there will be layoffs, but another part will be relocated to Mulheres. Another program canceled by the channel due to the sale of airtime to the UCKG was Ateliê na TV, which was in its second run since 2020.

On September 21, 2023, TV Gazeta joined the channel lineup of television operator Sky.

== Branding ==
The first logo of the station was a toucan, a symbol of its Brazilian cultural status, arranged to resemble the letter G, the station's initial. The logo was presented in monochrome format until 1972 when it gained a color version, with a yellow beak and three colors (blue, green, purple) in the eye and feathers.

The toucan was replaced in 1976 by a new one consisting of three pieces in the RGB color pattern (two small pieces, red and green, and a larger piece, blue, forming a sort of four-pointed star) along with the number 11. In 1983, the logo consisted of an orange arch and the number 11 inside a yellow outlined box, with the first 1 forming the G with the arch.

The following year, the logo was an italic number 11 with three bars to the left and right. The logo gained a futuristic aesthetic in 1986, as the network concentrated more on the state of São Paulo, with an abstract representation of the shape of the state formed by two 1s in opposite directions appeared, as well as the return of a Gazeta wordmark.

In 1987, this was replaced by a logo reminiscent of sister newspaper A Gazeta, in an extra bold typeface, in blue and with a segmented appearance. The logo adopted in 1989 was designed by Fernando Cerqueira Lemos in 1978 for the entrance of the building, and represented the company's TV, radio and print (Gazeta Esportiva) outlets.

A new symbol appeared in 1990, three rings, representing the circular dots that made up analog TV images, but following a CMY pattern, a direct reference to the station's roots in the print industry. Beginning in 1995, with the CNT/Gazeta partnership, a new wordmark appears based on the CNT one. Following the end of the partnership, the wordmark remained, whereas the G, this time taken from the wordmark, regained its status as a symbol. The G was made transparent in 2004, but was later made solid again in 2008 with the start of its digital signal.

In 2014, a new logo was adopted, the G used since 1995 (as a separate symbol since 2000) is now shown in a frontal perspective, in line with flat design trends, and the wordmark as a whole uses orange and gray as its colors, with the G in the larger orange piece, the other positioned to the right of the second A.

A new logo was leaked on January 31, 2026, entirely in orange, accompanied by a new Gazeta wordmark and a rehash of the initial toucan logo, except that it solely forms a G.

== Programs ==
Shows

- Nossa Noite com Rinaldi Faria
- 5 Discos
- Amor Concreto
- Cozinha Amiga
- Edição Extra
- Festa Sertaneja
- Gazeta Esportiva (Weekdays, Saturdays, and Sundays, 7AM)
- Jornal da Gazeta (Weekdays and Saturdays, 6AM)
- Jornal da Gazeta Edição das 10 (Sundays, 6AM)
- LBF - Brazilian Women's Basketball League (live sports coverage)
- Argentine Primera División (live sports coverage)
- Supercopa Argentina (live sports coverage)
- Mesa Redonda
- Mulheres
- Revista da Cidade
- Sempre Bela
- Vem Comigo
- Você Bonita
- Hugo Game (Hugo) (1995-1998)
- Captain Power
- ThunderCats
- CinemAção (Weekdays, Saturdays, and Sundays, 12AM)
- K-World
