= Steinkopf =

Steinkopf (/ˈʃtaɪnkɒpf/ SHTYNE-kopf, German: [ˈʃtaɪnkɔpf]) is a German word literally meaning "stone head". Some slightly different spellings such as Steinkopff exist. It may refer to:

== People ==
- Aryane Steinkopf, Brazilian model and MMA ring girl.
- Friedrich Wilhelm Steinkopf (1842–1911), German civil servant, former mayor of the towns of Kleve and Mülheim am Rhein
- Karl Steinkopf (de) (1773–1859), foreign secretary on the British and Foreign Bible Society
- Maitland Steinkopf (1912–1970), Canadian politician of the Progressive Conservative Party of Manitoba
- Max Steinkopf, co-founder of GB Railways
- Pete Steinkopf, guitarist of New Jerseyan punk rock band The Bouncing Souls
- Theodor Steinkopff (1870–1955), German publisher, founder of the Verlag Theodor Steinkopff
- Wilhelm Steinkopf (1879–1949), German chemist, involved in the development of mustard gas during World War I
- Willy Steinkopf (1885–1953), German politician of the Social Democratic Party of Germany

== Places ==
- Steinkopf, Northern Cape, a town in the Northern Cape province of South Africa
- Several hills and mountains in Hesse, Germany:
  - Steinkopf (Fuldatal) in the Fuldatal municipality
  - Steinkopf (Gutsbezirks Reinhardswald) (northwest), part of the Reinhardswald
  - Steinkopf (Hochtaunuskreis) in the Hochtaunuskreis district
  - Steinkopf (Odenwald), part of the Odenwald
  - Steinkopf (Rhön), part of the Rhön Mountains
  - Steinkopf (Südostteil des Gutsbezirks Reinhardswald), part of the Reinhardswald
  - Steinkopf (Wetteraukreis) in the Wetteraukreis district
- Several hills and mountains in Rhineland-Palatinate, Germany:
  - Steinkopf (Pfalz) in the Palatinate Forest
  - Steinkopf (Westerwald), part of the Westerwald

== Other ==
- Verlag J. F. Steinkopf, German publishing company based in Stuttgart, Germany
- Verlag Theodor Steinkopff, German publishing company based in Dresden, Germany
