= Panicats =

Pânico's stage attendants

The Panicats were the stage assistants of the Brazilian comedy TV shows Pânico na TV and Pânico na Band. Over a period of 14 years since the show's debut in 2003, a total of 26 women occupied this position. Recognized as sex symbols, the Panicats appeared in small outfits (such as bikinis) during live TV programs and also recorded participations in segments and helped with reports. Cases of moral and sexual harassment and low pay gained media attention when some of the former Panicats publicly exposed the situations they experienced on the TV show.

The experience as Panicats provided several of these women with media visibility after leaving Pânico, including sensual essays in adult magazines, participation in reality shows and opportunities on other television shows.

| Years | Image | Name | Artistic name |
|---|---|---|---|
| 2004 | | Andressa Zizzari | |
| 2004–2005 | | Valéria Machado | |
| 2004–2005 | | Vanessa Zotth | |
| 2004–2005 | | Mariana Skieres | |
| 2005–2011 | | Dani Bolina | |
| 2005–2008 | | Tânia Oliveira | |
| 2005–2008 | | Gabriela Monteiro | Gabi Fon Fon |
| 2007–2010 | | Lizi Benites | Piu-Piu |
| 2007–2008 | | Regiane Brunnquell | Sandy Capetinha |
| 2008–2011 | | Juju Salimeni | |
| 2009–2012 | Panicat Nicole Bahls | Nicole Bahls | |
| 2010–2013 | | Babi Rossi | |
| 2011 | | Aryane Steinkopf | |
| 2011 | | Jaque Khury | |
| 2012 | | Carol Belli | |
| 2012 | | Carol Narizinho | |
| 2012–2014 | | Renata Molinaro | |
| 2012 | | Thaís Bianca | |
| 2013–2017 | Panicat Carol Dias | Carol Dias | |
| 2013–2014 | | Ana Paula Minerato | |
| 2014–2017 | | Babi Muniz | |
| 2014–2017 | | Fernanda Lacerda | Mendigata |
| 2014–2017 | | Mari Gonzalez | Mari Baianinha |
| 2015–2017 | | Aline Mineiro | |
| 2017 | | Aricia Silva | |
| 2017 | | Wendy Tavares | |
