= Emílio Surita =

Brazilian radio and television presenter

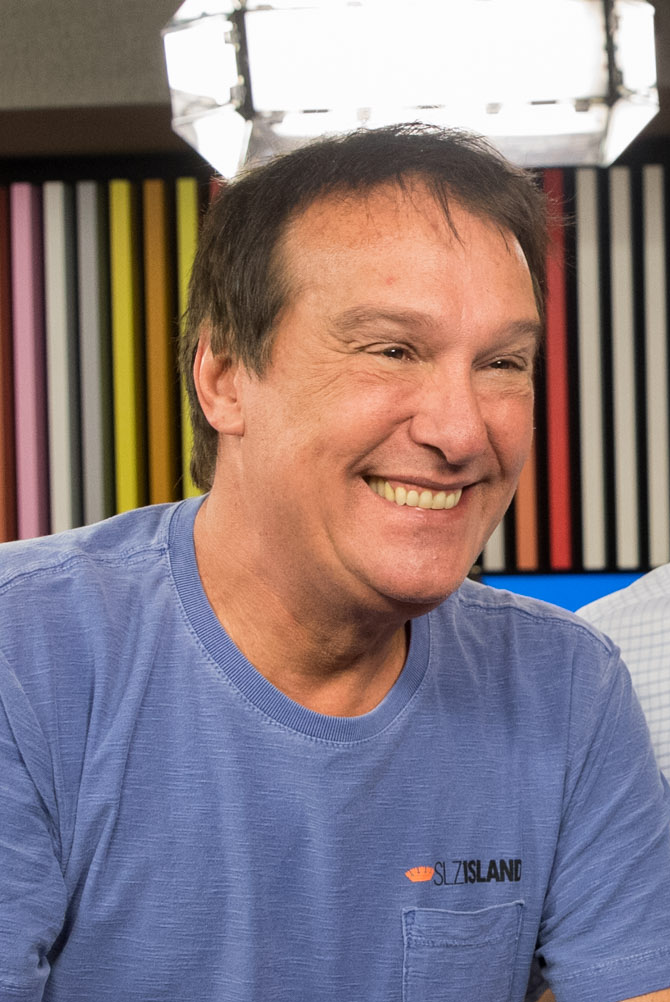
- Surita at the Pânico studio in February 2019
- Born: Antônio Emílio Sáenz Surita; August 17, 1961 (age 65); São Manuel, São Paulo, Brazil
- Citizenship: Brazilian
- Education: Anhembi Morumbi University
- Occupations: Radio host; television presenter; director
- Relatives: Teresa Surita (sister)

Antônio Emílio Sáenz Surita (August 17, 1961) is a Brazilian radio broadcaster, television presenter, and television director.

== Biography ==
=== Early years and education ===
Emílio was born in São Manuel, a city in the interior of São Paulo, where he began his career working at a local radio station. He moved to São Paulo to study law, where he attended Anhembi Morumbi University. Although he graduated, he never worked in the field.

=== Career ===
He began his career in advertising agencies and also worked as a host for TV Mappin, a teleshopping channel belonging to the Mappin network.

Before starting to work in radio, Surita made a few appearances on TV Manchete, presenting youth programs alongside Patrícia Pillar and João Kleber. At Rede Bandeirantes, he participated in the station's coverage of Carnival. Later, at TV Record, he hosted a program with his colleagues Bola and Japonês. He appeared on Ratinho's program on SBT and also on Caldeirão do Huck on TV Globo. In the 1990s, he also hosted the program Siga Bem Caminhoneiro on SBT.

In 1993, he created the program Pânico on Rádio Jovem Pan, a daily comedy show. The radio program was the embryo of two versions of the TV program, one aired on Rede TV for over ten years and a second aired on Bandeirantes for five years. The radio program remains on the air to this day. In 2021, the program also began airing on Jovem Pan News, a television station owned by the Jovem Pan group.

== Controversies ==
In July 2020, his son Eric revealed that Emílio kicked him out of the house for revealing his bisexuality. In an interview with Maurício Meirelles and Renato Albani on the radio program Stand UP Jovem Pan, he stated that he had to live away from home for two years, receiving help only from his mother. However, in June of the following year, Eric denied the expulsion, stating that it was “nothing more than a joke” and that on the morning of the interview, he had agreed to the ‘prank’ to “mess with” his father, who, according to him, was experiencing cancellations during the week; but he did not deny his bisexuality.

On the June 13, 2019 edition of the program Pânico, Surita jokingly claimed that journalist Mônica Bergamo had a tattoo of Luiz Inácio Lula da Silva on her groin. The journalist responded on Twitter with a quote from Chilean poet Nicanor Parra about “silence.” On the July 17, 2020, edition, in which YouTuber Bianca Andrade was interviewed on the same program and the topic was “machismo,” Surita interrupted her several times, which irritated the interviewee.

== Personal life ==
Emílio is married to Anne Ingegerd Sköldberg Luyet Surita, a Swedish woman living in Brazil, and has two children, Eduardo Surita and Eric Surita. He is the brother of Teresa Surita, former mayor of Boa Vista, capital of the state of Roraima, and brother-in-law of former minister Romero Jucá.

In 2023, Emílio Surita was diagnosed with bowel cancer and underwent surgery to remove the cancer.

== Filmography ==
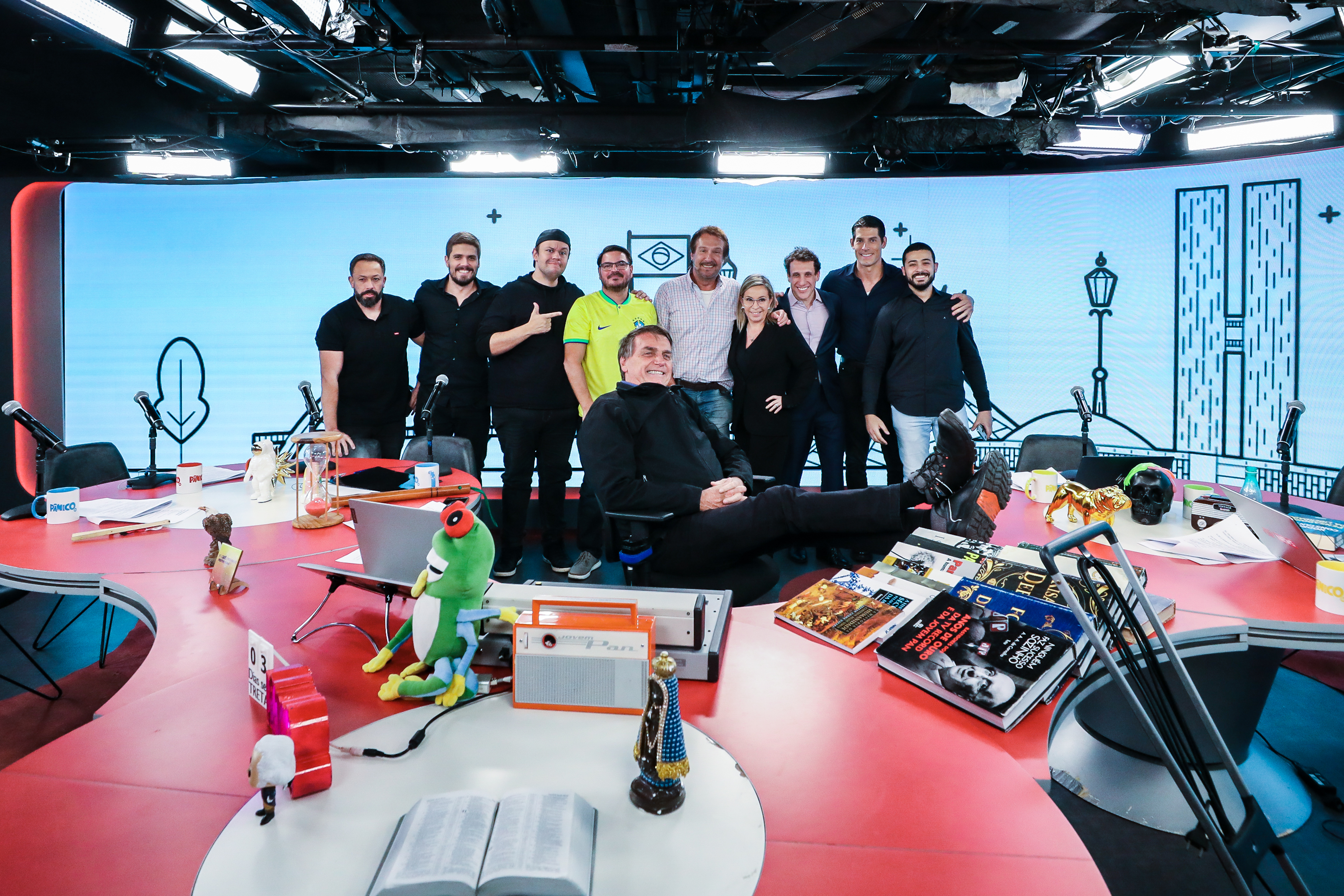
Bolsonaro's appearance on the Pânico program.

=== Television ===
Year	Title	Role	Network	Ref.
1980–1982	Band Folia	Host	Band	
1982–1983	Globo Esporte	Host	Globo	
1983–1984	Jornal da Band	Anchor	Band	
1984–1985	Superspecial	Host	Band	
1985–1988	Batalha 85	Host	Band	
1988–1991	Bis	Host	Rede Manchete	
1995	Telesisan	Host	SBT	
1995–1997	Siga Bem Caminhoneiro	Host	SBT	
1997–1998	TV Mappin	Host	Various networks	
2000–2002	Caldeirão do Huck	Co-host	Globo	
2003–2011	Pânico na TV	Host	RedeTV!	
2012–2017	Pânico na Band	Host	Band	
2021–present	Pânico	Host	Jovem Pan News	

=== Radio ===
Year	Title	Role	Station	Ref.
1979–1990	Clube AM Esporte	Host	Rádio Clube AM	
1993–present	Pânico	Host	Jovem Pan FM	
