= Band Folia =

TV Bandeirantes program that covers the Brazilian carnival every year

- Also known as: Carnaval Band Brasil (1993–1994)
- Genre: Music; Journalism
- Country of origin: Brazil
- Original language: Portuguese

Production
- Running time: Variable
- Production company: Grupo Bandeirantes de Comunicação

Original release
- Network: Rede Bandeirantes
- Release: 19 February 1993 – present

Related
- Globeleza; SBT Folia; Bastidores do Carnaval

Band Folia is Rede Bandeirantes' coverage of Carnival in Brazil. Produced annually since 1993, with a hiatus between 1995 and 1998, the coverage is currently based on live broadcasts and flashes of the Carnival blocks in Salvador, São Paulo, and Rio de Janeiro, during programming and on television news. As part of the programming leading up to the festivities, the network airs the Boletim Band Folia throughout its programming and, through Band Bahia, the special De Olho na Folia. In its regular coverage, Band São Paulo airs Sampa Folia locally, while some of Band's affiliates across the country provide coverage under their local brands.

== History ==
Between 1981 and 1983, Band broadcast the Rio de Janeiro samba school parades, still on Avenida Marquês de Sapucaí. The station also became known for broadcasting carnival balls, especially the Gala Gay at the old Scala, concert hall and party venue in Leblon, in the southern part of the city.

In 1993, Band launched "Carnaval Band Brasil", inaugurating the broadcast of the Salvador carnival. The station continued to present highlights of the festivities in Rio de Janeiro and the São Paulo carnival, in addition to broadcasting the carnival balls.

=== Band Folia ===
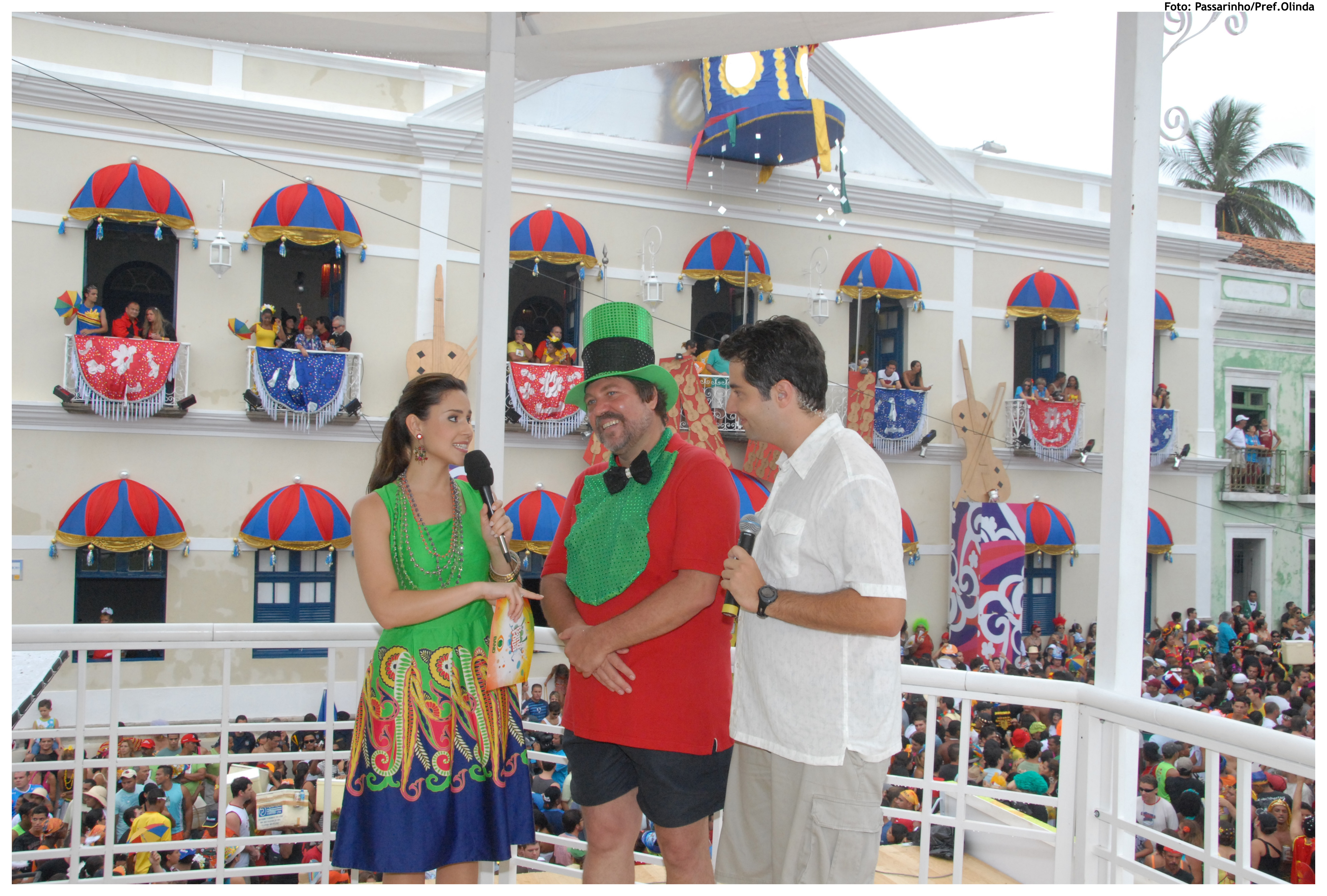
Nadja Haddad and Luiz Megale interview then-mayor Renildo Calheiros during Band Folia's coverage of the Olinda Carnival.

In 1999, Band returned to investing in Carnival coverage, filling the gap left by Rede Manchete, which was already close to bankruptcy. The broadcaster reached a press pool agreement with Rede Globo to broadcast the parades of the Special Group samba schools in Rio de Janeiro. In addition, Band also aired the parades of the Access Group, the Champions' Parade, and maintained its programming of the balls. The broadcasts marked the debut of Luciano do Valle in the Rio carnival, as well as the arrival of Astrid Fontenelle, coming from MTV Brasil.

Starting in 2000, the station focused on the Salvador carnival, showing the parade of trio elétricos. Band continued to broadcast the Champions Parade, which remained part of its programming until 2011. In 2010, it added coverage of the Pernambuco carnival in Recife and Olinda, and in 2013, the Vitória Carnival, capital of the state of Espírito Santo. The latter was the only year in which there were also some flashes of the João Pessoa, capital from Paraíba, Carnival.

Carnival coverage was provided in three ways: with flashes during programming, with live entries on the station's newscasts, and with live broadcasts late at night, in the early hours of the morning, and in the early afternoon of the parades of the electric trios of Salvador, on the "Dodô" (Barra-Ondina) and "Osmar" (Campo Grande) circuits. During the broadcasts in the aforementioned periods, there are also live or recorded segments from carnivals in other cities, such as Recife (Marco Zero) and Olinda, Rio de Janeiro (Marquês de Sapucaí), São Paulo (Anhembi Sambadrome), and Vitória (Sambão do Povo).

In 2018, commemorating Band Folia's 25th anniversary, the station broadcast live from São Paulo during the afternoons. In 2023, the Rio de Janeiro access group returned to the station. In 2024, it was announced that João Paulo Vergueiro and Thaís Dias would take over the Gold Series parades, replacing Sérgio Maurício and Glenda Kozlowski. In 2026, in addition to continuing to broadcast the Gold Series parades, it will now return with the broadcast of the LigaSP Access Group 1 parade.

== Audience ==
In 2012, along with SBT Folia, the program lost its audience to RecordTV's religious programs. Band Folia lost for three consecutive days to Fala que Eu Te Escuto, an evangelical program linked to the Universal Church of the Kingdom of God (IURD). It usually scores between zero and 1 point on IBOPE. The last major audience reported was on February 19, 2007, when it ranked second in audience ratings for 30 minutes. According to RD1, it is common throughout the year for Carnival to bring down "the audience ratings of broadcasters that cover the festivities, whether in Rio-São Paulo or Salvador." When the 2016 Carnival broadcasts began, Band scored 1 rating point, down from 3 with The Simpsons and Pânico na Band.

== Participants ==
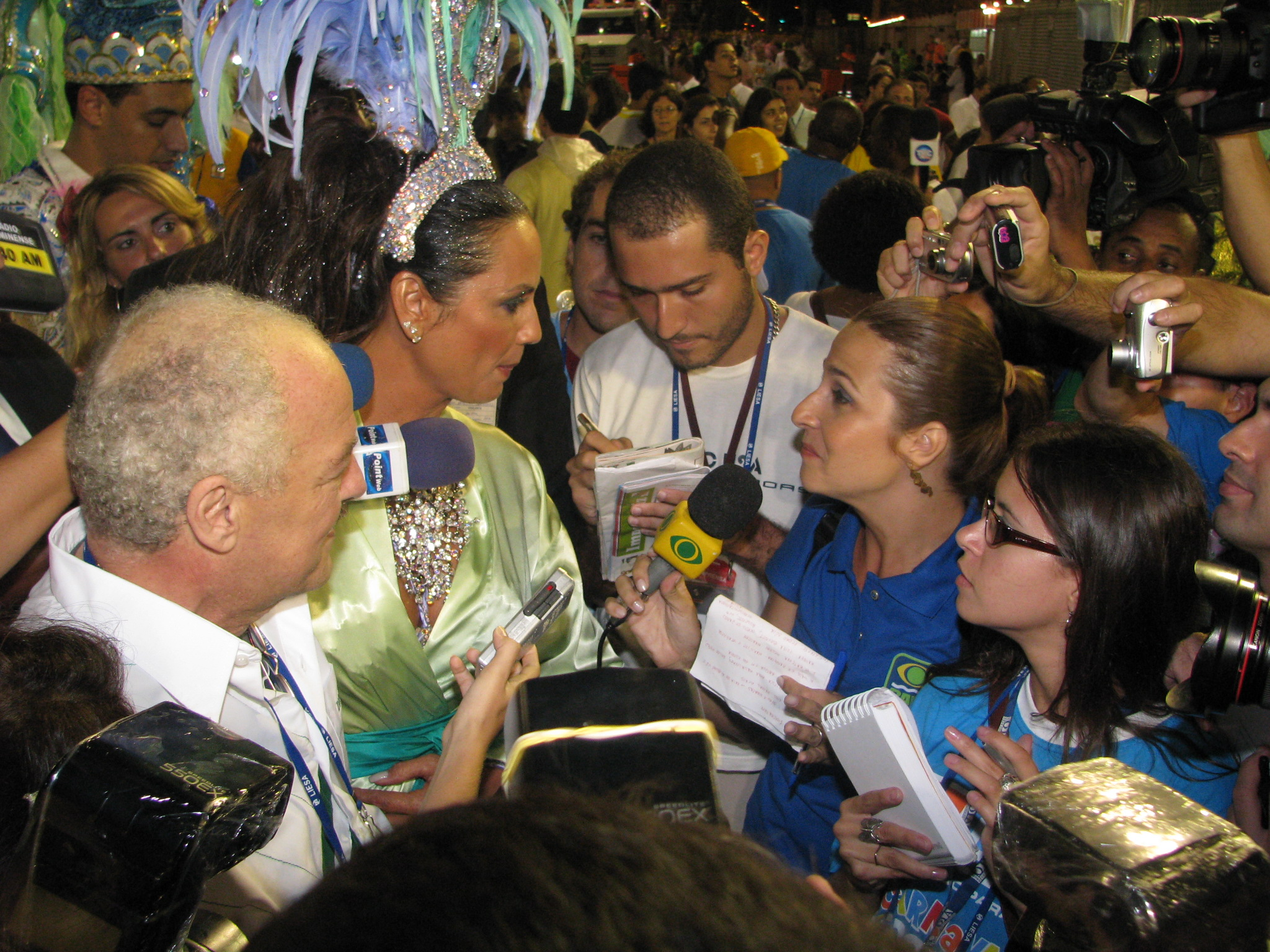
A team from Band Folia interviews Luíza Brunet at the 2008 carnival.

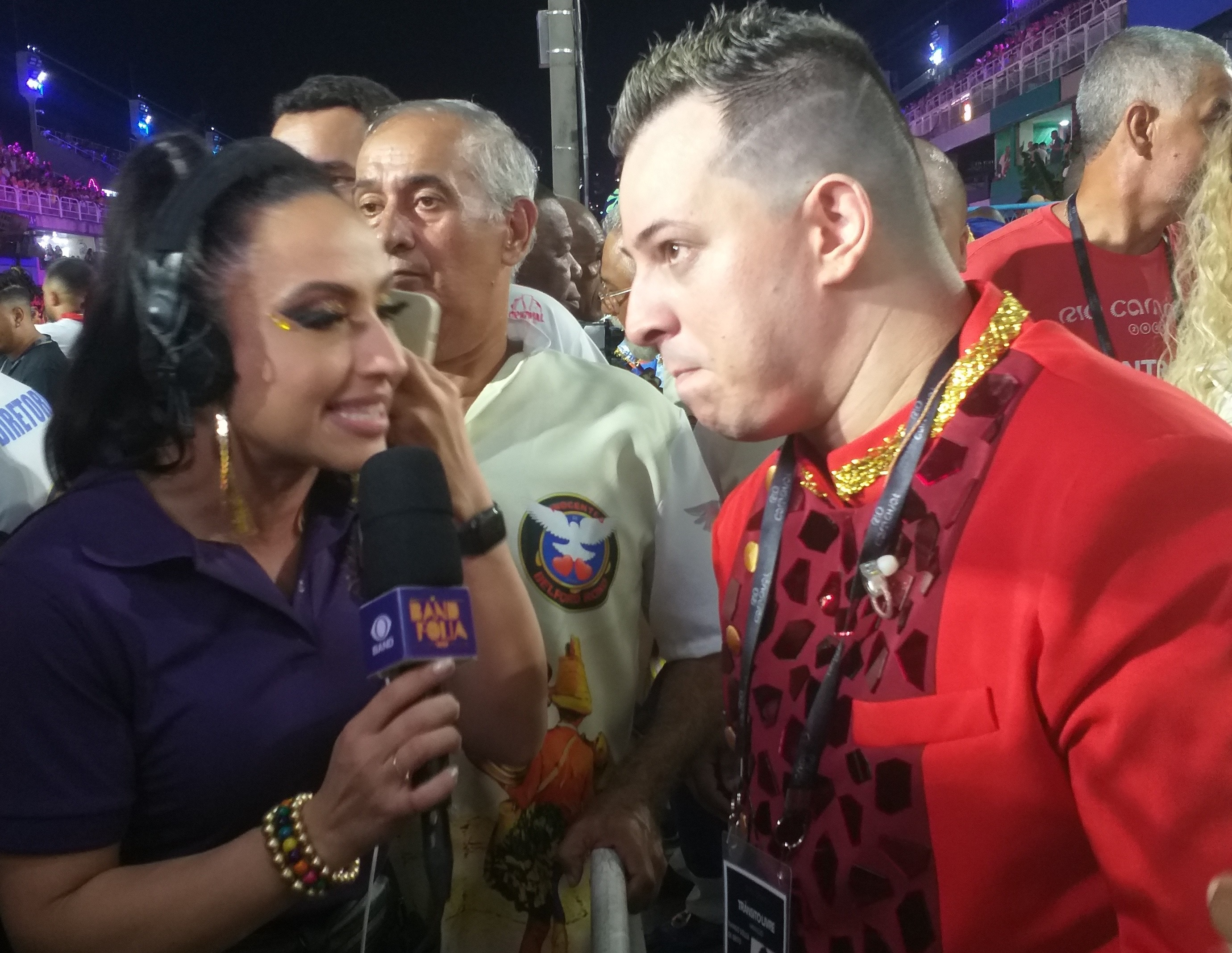
Samba singer Thiago Brito is interviewed by Band Folia during Carnival 2024.

In their roles as reporters and presenters, several well-known Brazilian television personalities have participated in coverage of the Band Folia program:

- Carla Perez
- Zeca Camargo
- Adriane Galisteu
- Lola Melnick
- Astrid Fontenelle
- Emílio Surita
- André Vasco
- Téo José
- Amin Khader
- Nadja Haddad
- Luciano do Valle
- Nivaldo Prieto
- Otávio Mesquita
- Rita Batista
- Mônica Apor
- Luiz Megale
- Leonor Côrrea
- Catia Fonseca
- Patrícia Maldonado
- China
- Silvia Poppovic
- José Luiz Datena
- Fernando Vanucci
- Sabrina Parlatore
- Otaviano Costa
- Joana Prado
- Suzana Alves
- Edgard Piccoli
- Glenda Kozlowski
- Marcos Mion
- Romário

== Band Folia Trophy ==
Since 2000, the program has annually awarded the Band Folia Trophy, which includes among the winners the best of Carnival in the following categories:

- Best Female Singer;
- Best Male Singer;
- Best Band;
- Best Song;
- New Artist;
- Best Carnival Block.
