= Caiado =

Caiado is a surname. Notable people with the surname include:

- David Caiado (born 1987), Portuguese footballer
- Fernando Caiado (1925–2006), Portuguese footballer and manager
- Manoela Caiado (born 1989), Brazilian journalist
- Ronaldo Caiado (born 1949), Brazilian politician
