= Manoela Caiado =

Manoela Caiado de Moura (born July 11, 1989 in Governador Valadares), better known as Manoela Caiado, is a journalist, television presenter and Brazilian reporter. She currently works Influencer Digital.

== Career ==
Manoela holds a degree in journalism from Universidade Estácio de Sá (Rio de Janeiro). She worked for Rádio Jovem Pan Vitória and TV Vitória / Record, where she presented the Weather Forecast and eventually the Jornal da TV Vitória. In 2012 she made Rio + 20 coverage for the Espírito Santo radio station.

In 2013, in Rio de Janeiro, she presented the daily "Pan's Morning" at the Jovem Pan FM Rio de Janeiro and covered Rock in Rio 2013, at Estácio de Sá University.

In 2014 she worked as a producer at Fox Sports Brasil, where she participated in the coverage of the 2014 FIFA World Cup.

In December 2014 she joined Windguru wave prediction and went to Hawaii alone to cover the last stage of the Men's Surfing World Tour, when Gabriel Medina became World Champion.

Since 2015, she has been a member of the Canals Esporte Interativo, where she commanded the Golden Bulletin, eventually the Podium Road, participated in the coverage of the 2016 Summer Olympics. Manoela also presented the Night of the Craques, next to Zico and Rivellino. Nowadays, she is in charge of the Sports Newspaper, which reports on the events of the sports world and covers the major football championships in Brazil and the world, such as the UEFA Champions League, European Championships, Football, Brazil Soccer Cup, Copa Libertadores de América and Northeast Soccer Cup.

== Personal life ==
Manoela was born in Governador Valadares, but grew up in Vitória – ES. In 2013 she moved to Rio de Janeiro where she pursued a career in TV and Radio.

In 2015, Manoela dated Argentine basketball player Nicolás Laprovíttola, who, at the time, defended the Flamengo Regatta Club and the Argentine Men's Basketball Team.

== Awards and nominations ==
year	premium	category	Job	result	Ref
2016	Best of the Telejornalismo	Best Sports Channel Presenter	Sports Notebook	Indicated	
