= Rio Shore =

Brazilian reality television series

- Genre: Reality
- Based on: Jersey Shore
- Country of origin: Brazil
- Original language: Portuguese
- No. of seasons: 4
- No. of episodes: 49

Production
- Running time: 50–59 minutes
- Production companies: Endemol Shine Brasil; VIS; MTV

Original release
- Network: Paramount+
- Release: September 30, 2021 – present
- Network: MTV Brasil
- Release: September 30, 2021 – August 31, 2023

Related
- Acapulco Shore; All Star Shore; De Férias com o Ex; De Férias com o Ex Caribe; De Férias com o Ex Diretoria

Rio Shore is a Brazilian reality television series that premiered on MTV Brasil and Paramount+ on September 30, 2021. It is the Brazilian adaptation of the American program Jersey Shore. It follows the same format as the Mexican version. The show follows the lives of ten participants who live in Rio de Janeiro, Brazil.

== Production ==
The show was announced in May 2021. Because the show was filmed during the COVID-19 pandemic, it followed strict hygiene protocols. In addition to constant COVID-19 testing by both the cast and production members, and everyone involved went through a quarantine period.

=== Cancellation (2024) ===
A fourth season was filmed in Floripa, Brazil from September–October 2023. However, in January 2024 the series was cancelled due to the financial hardship & widespread company layoffs facing Paramount Global. All Brazilian productions were immediately halted and a variety of original content was removed from Paramount+ without notice.

=== Return to the air (2026) ===
In July 2026, the return of the program was announced following the merger between Paramount and Warner Bros. Discovery in Brazil.

== Series ==
Year	Series	Predominant location	Episodes
2021	Series 1	Armação dos Búzios	12
2022	Series 2	Joá	12
2023	Series 3	Joá	12
2026	Series 4	Florianópolis	13

=== Series 1 (2021) ===
The first season was filmed in June and July 2021. In July 2021, the series' first teaser was released. The main cast members were announced in August 2021, including Matheus Crivella, known for participating in De Férias com o Ex and Acapulco Shore, Cristal Felix, Guilherme Evaristo, Jessica Barros, Juliana Casaes, Kevin Jolsan, Natallia Fromaggeri, Patrick Salles, Ricardo Salusse and Vitória Araújo. He also has other supporting cast members, including five contestants from De Férias com o Ex, including Martina Sanzi, Bruno Mooneyhan, Gabriel Aglio, Jarlles Gois and Tainá Felipe.

=== Series 2 (2022) ===
On February 15, 2022, Paramount+ unveiled its new lineup of unscripted series and renewals for MTV Entertainment Studios, including renewing the show's second season. The second season of the show was filmed in January and February 2022. The first sneak peek of the season was released on April 28, 2022. and premiered on June 9, 2022. Four new cast members were announced on May 10, including Aoxi, Cayo Rodrigues, Maryane Valim and William Guimarães. Cristal Félix, Guilherme Evaristo, Juliana Casaes, Kevin Jolsan returned to the show later. Patrick was kicked out of the season during the third episode after he physically assaulted another cast member.

=== Series 3 (2023) ===
The third season premiered on June 15, 2023. It was filmed in February 2023 in Rio de Janeiro. Half of the cast from the second season did not return to the show. It introduces for the first time six new cast members, Beatriz Valença, Helena Steigne, Leonardo Carvalho, Matheus Miranda y Thiago Hippólito.

=== Series 4 (2026) ===
The fourth season premiered on August 6, 2026. It was filmed in September and October 2023 in Florianópolis, Santa Catarina. It features the return of original cast member Patrick Sales and introduces new cast members Day Dakar and Gabriel Ralin.

== Cast ==
=== Main ===
Cast member	Seasons			
Cast member	1	2	3	4
Vitória Araújo	Main	Main	Guest	
Natallia Formaggeri	Main	Main	Guest	
Kevin Jolsan	Main	Main		
Guilherme Evaristo	Main	Main	Main	
Patrick Salles	Main	Main	Guest	Main
Jéssica Barros	Main	Main	Main	Main
Juliana "Mississippi" Casaes	Main	Main	Main	Main
Matheus "Novinho" Crivella	Main	Main	Main	Main
Cristal Felix	Main	Main	Main	Main
Ricardo "Rick" Salusse	Main	Main	Main	Main
Aoxi		Main		
Cayo Rodrigues		Main		
William Guimarães		Main	Main	
Maryane Valim		Main	Main	
Thiago "Thippo" Hippólito			Main	
Matheus Miranda			Main	
Beatriz "Triz" Valença			Main	
Leonardo Carvalho			Main	Main
Daniele Japa			Main	Main
Helena Steigne			Main	Main
Day Dakar				Main
Gabriel Ralin				Main

=== Recurring ===
Throughout the show, the supporting cast was briefly introduced, including former De Férias com o Ex contestants.

Cast member	Seasons			
Cast member	1	2	3	4
Gabriel Aglio	Recurring			
Luana Mandarino	Recurring			
Bruno Manteiguinha	Recurring			
Caíque Meirelles	Recurring		Guest	
Gabriella "Gabi" Boto	Recurring	Recurring		
Clara Ribeiro	Recurring			
Rico Melquiades		Recurring		
Stephanie Nader		Recurring		
Jojo Todynho			Recurring	
Nicole Bahls				Recurring
Leslie Gallardo				Recurring

== Episodes ==
Season	Episodes	Originally released	
Season	Episodes	First released	Last released
1	12	September 30, 2021	December 9, 2021
2	12	June 9, 2022	July 19, 2022
3	12	June 15, 2023	August 31, 2023
4	13	August 6, 2026	September 10, 2026
