= Amaury Dumbo =

- Pânico character
- First appearance: Pânico na TV
- Last appearance: Pânico Na Band
- Based on: Amaury Júnior
- Portrayed by: Rodrigo Scarpa Márvio Lúcio

Amaury Dumbo is a character created and portrayed by Márvio Lúcio on the show Pânico, serving as a parody of television host Amaury Júnior.

== Origin ==
The character first appeared in 2003, in a segment called "Amaury Dumbo Show" on the program Pânico na TV. In it, the character, accompanied by other cast members would attend parties and events, offering food and drinks to guests as a parody of the events hosted by the original presenter. On other occasions, the segments involved pranks played on guests and strangers alike.

== Reception ==
=== Lawsuit ===
In 2014, the actor who played the character faced a lawsuit after being accused of humiliating a participant during the filming of the show Pânico na TV. On that occasion, the comedian allegedly spat into a cup and asked the participant to drink its contents. At the conclusion of the legal proceedings, RedeTV!, the network responsible for the showwas ordered to pay damages.

=== Cameos ===
In 2018, Amaury invited the actor who played the character onto his show as a form of tribute, praising his performance.
