= Rio Shore series 4 =

Rio Shore
- Season 4
- No. of episodes: 13

Release
- Original network: Paramount+
- Original release: 6 August – 10 September 2026

Season chronology
- ← Previous; Series 3

The fourth series of Rio Shore, a Brazilian television programme based in Rio de Janeiro. The season premiered on February 6, 2026, on Paramount+ throughout Latin America. It was filmed in September and October 2023 in Florianópolis, Santa Catarina. Initially scheduled to air sometime in 2024, it was canceled in January of that year following the cessation of operations of the paid streaming service as part of Paramount's restructuring.

It features new cast members Day Dakar and Gabriel Ralin, as well as the return of original cast member Patrick Salles, who had been dismissed from the series during the second season. Brazilian television personality Nicole Bahls was featured as the head of the season. Leslie Gallardo, who was participating in Acapulco Shore when this season was filmed, made a special appearance in several episodes.

== Cast ==
- Jéssica Barros
- Leonardo Carvalho
- Juliana "Mississippi" Casaes
- Matheus "Novinho" Crivella
- Day Dakar
- Cristal Felix
- Daniele Japa
- Gabriel Ralin
- Patrick Salles
- Ricardo "Rick" Salusse
- Helena Steigne

=== Special guest ===
- Leslie Gallardo

=== Duration of cast ===
Name	Episodes												
Name	1	2	3	4	5	6	7	8	9	10	11	12	13
Cristal													
Day													
Gabriel													
Helena													
Japa													
Jéssica													
Juliana													
Leonardo													
Leslie													
Matheus													
Patrick													
Ricardo													

= Cast member is featured in this episode.
= Cast member arrives in the house.
= Cast member returns to the house.
= Cast member leaves the series.
= Cast member returns to the series.
= Cast member does not feature in this episode.
= "Cast member" is not a cast member in this episode.

== Episodes ==
No. overall	No. in season	Title	Original release date
37	1	"Episode 2"	August 6, 2026
38	2	"Episode 2"	August 6, 2026
39	3	"Episode 3"	August 6, 2026
40	4	"Episode 4"	August 13, 2026
41	5	"Episode 5"	August 13, 2026
42	6	"Episode 6"	August 20, 2026
43	7	"Episode 7"	August 20, 2026
44	8	"Episode 8"	August 27, 2026
45	9	"Episode 9"	August 27, 2026
46	10	"Episode 10"	September 3, 2026
47	11	"Episode 11"	September 3, 2026
48	12	"Episode 12"	September 10, 2026
49	13	"Episode 13"	September 10, 2026
