= Iride Semprini =

Brazilian actress and comedian (1931–2022)

- Born: Iride Semprini de Bellis; 10 May 1931; São Paulo, Brazil
- Died: 15 June 2022 (aged 91)
- Occupation: Actress
- Years active: 2013–2019

Iride Semprini de Bellis (10 May 1931 – 15 June 2022) was a Brazilian actress and comedian.

== Life and career ==
Semprini became known between 2013 and 2015 for participating in the segments of the program Pânico na Band as "Vovó Vida Loka",

Semprini died on 15 June 2022, at the age of 91, due to complications from Alzheimer's disease .

== Filmography ==
- Pânico na Band (2013)
- A Dona do Pedaço (2019)
