= Rio Shore series 1 =

Rio Shore - O Rio Tá On
- Season 1
- No. of episodes: 12

Release
- Original network: MTV; Paramount+
- Original release: 30 September – 9 December 2021

Season chronology
- Next → Series 2

The first series of Rio Shore, a Brazilian television programme based in Rio de Janeiro, began airing on September 30, 2021, on MTV. The show follows the lives of ten participants who live in Armação dos Búzios. Cast members were announced ahead of the series, including Cristal Felix, Guilherme Evaristo, Jessica Barros, Juliana Casaes, Kevin Jolsan, Natallia Fromaggeri, Patrick Salles, Ricardo Salusse and Vitória Araújo, and renowned star De Férias com o Ex y Acapulco Shore, Matheus Crivella.

He also has other supporting cast members, including five contestants from De Férias com o Ex, including Martina Sanzi, Bruno Mooneyhan, Gabriel Aglio, Jarlles Gois and Tainá Felipe.

== Cast ==
- Vitória Araújo
- Jéssica Barros
- Juliana "Mississippi" Casaes
- Matheus "Novinho" Crivella
- Guilherme Evaristo
- Cristal Felix
- Natallia Formaggeri
- Kevin Jolsan
- Patrick Salles
- Ricardo "Rick" Salusse

=== Duration of cast ===
Cast members	Episodes											
Cast members	1	2	3	4	5	6	7	8	9	10	11	12
Cristal												
Guilherme												
Jéssica												
Juliana												
Kevin												
Matheus												
Natalia												
Patrick												
Ricardo												
Vitória												

= Cast member is featured in this episode.
= Cast member arrives in the house.
= Cast member leaves the series.

== Episodes ==
No. overall	No. in season	Title	Original release date
1	1	"Episode 1"	September 30, 2021
On the first day of the vacation, ten cariocas meet and discover the house that will be the home of the Rio Shore family. Right away, everyone gets along well and shows a little of what they're going to spend on this vacation: lots of partying and causation.
2	2	"Episode 2"	September 30, 2021
Boss summons four family members for the first day of work at her inn. A friend of Patrick's calls everyone to go to Fishbone for another day of fun, which results in an after-hour full of guests and bartering at the Shore house.
3	3	"Episode 3"	October 7, 2021
The family explores Búzios for an afternoon on the dunes and an evening at the Gipsy bar, where they meet familiar faces. The meeting upsets Juliana and Vitória, who is pushed to the limit after Patrick talks nonsense. Juliana starts to bother some members of the house.
4	4	"Episode 4"	October 14, 2021
Gabriel Aglio calls his friend Novinho and all the Shore family members to a lively party at his house. Juliana proves that she is already in another one, while Vitória is still trying to manage her feelings.
5	5	"Episode 5"	October 21, 2021
After a morning enjoying the beautiful landscapes, the family has a barbecue at home and invites some friends they made during the season. Patrick's guest and her friend annoy many of the Rio Shore home and the night ends in a series of fights.
6	6	"Episode 6"	October 28, 2021
Vitória and Patrick put an end to each other. Patrick is annoyed with Jessica and Crystal and starts a fight involving the whole family. Natallia begins to open her eye to some truths about William.
7	7	"Episode 7"	November 4, 2021
Guilherme and Natallia try to understand their relationship. Jarlles cheers up the house with an invitation to Filipe Ret's concert. At home, the mess is guaranteed by the arrival of a bomb for Jéssica.
8	8	"Episode 8"	November 11, 2021
The arrival of Cristal's friend causes a big fight between her and Jessica. Patrick and Guilherme also disagree. The boss releases a boat trip to the Shores, which makes for another exciting day.
9	9	"Episode 9"	November 18, 2021
Natallia and Guilherme continue to turn the relationship around, as do Vitória and Juliana after a friend of Luana's comes between the two. Patrick calls the family to a nude beach, which doesn't suit everyone.
10	10	"Episode 10"	November 25, 2021
The Shores go to a masked ball and meet new friends from Novinho. Vitória and Patrick fall into an unusual situation. After a night in a couple atmosphere, Vitória fights with Guilherme and ends up spilling more people into the house.
11	11	"Episode 11"	December 2, 2021
Kevin kisses Jessica's enemy, which generates a very tense atmosphere. Between slaps and kisses, Luana and Patrick remain firm and strong, but again a joke ends in a fight.
12	12	"Episode 12"	December 9, 2021
An exciting lunch at the yacht club marks the last day of the vacation. The "Boss" prepares a surprise for his guests and between lemon pie and sex, the last night is well spent.
