= Sex symbol =

Person or character widely regarded as sexually attractive

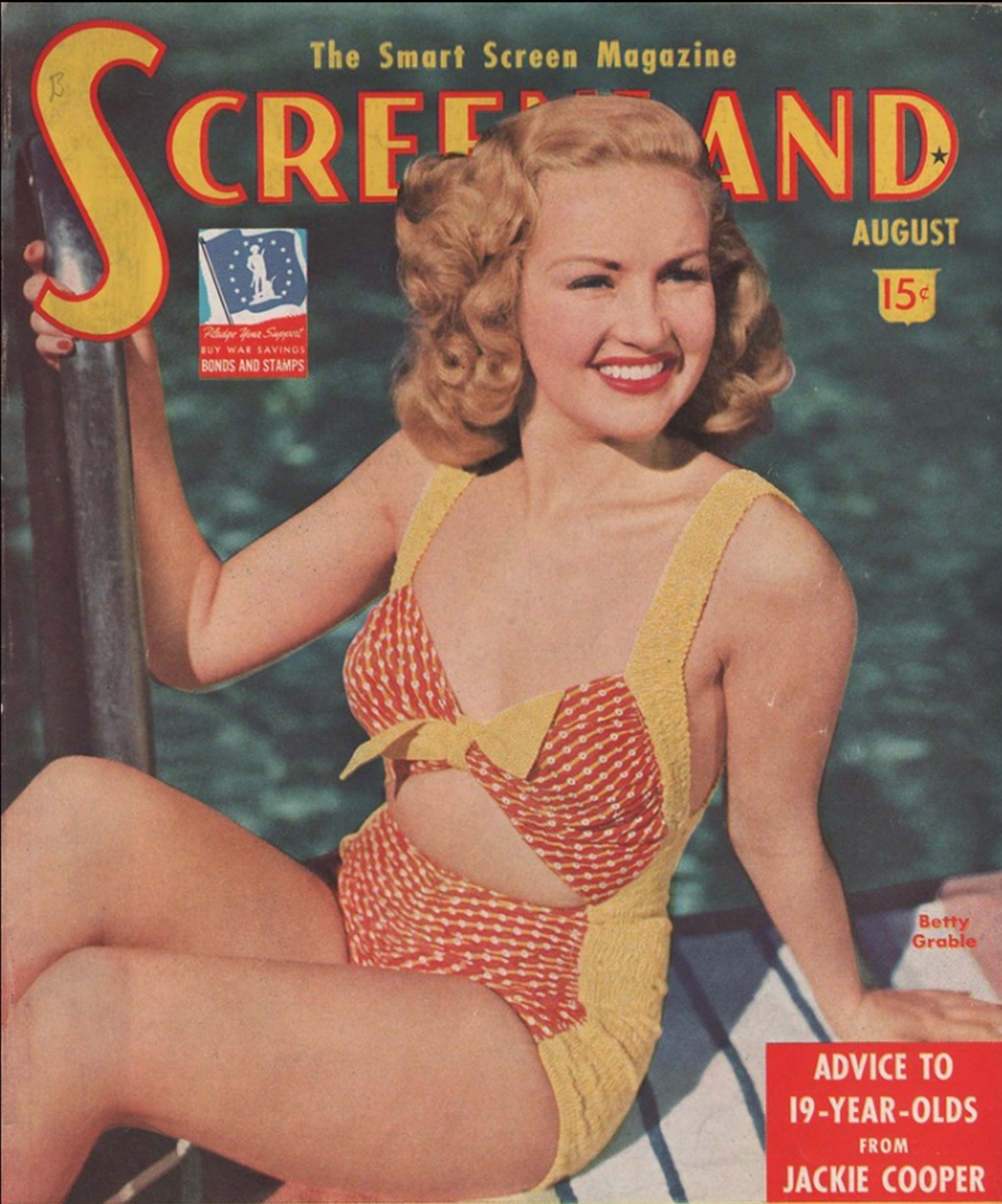
Betty Grable was a prominent sex symbol during her career.

A sex symbol or icon is a person or character widely considered sexually attractive and often synonymous with sexuality.

== History ==
The term sex symbol was first used in the 1910s and 1920s to describe the first emerging film stars. Movie studios have relied heavily on the looks and sex appeal of their actors to attract audiences. The use of this concept increased during World War II. Sex symbols could be male as well as female: actors such as the romantic Sessue Hayakawa and the athletic Douglas Fairbanks were popular in the 1910s and 1920s. Archetypal screen lover Rudolph Valentino's death in 1926 caused mass hysteria among his female fans.

== Film industry ==
Silent film actor Rudolph Valentino is regarded as the first screen sex symbol. His film The Sheik (1921), in which he portrays an Arab sheikh, established his reputation across the world as a major sex symbol. Silent film actress Theda Bara was one of Hollywood's first sex symbols. In the 1950s, Dorothy Dandridge's performance as the seductive Carmen in Carmen Jones made her Hollywood's first African-American sex symbol. The "bad boy" image of the 1950s was epitomized by sex symbols such as James Dean and Marlon Brando, and women like Marilyn Monroe, Jayne Mansfield, Mamie Van Doren and French superstar Brigitte Bardot were seen as the archetype of the blonde bombshell. Other Hollywood actresses that were considered sex symbols include Elizabeth Taylor, Sophia Loren, Audrey Hepburn, and Raquel Welch. Until the 1950s the sex symbol was seen as just a sexual ideal, but in the 1960s it was seen as a symbol of the emancipation of sexuality with the sexual revolution.

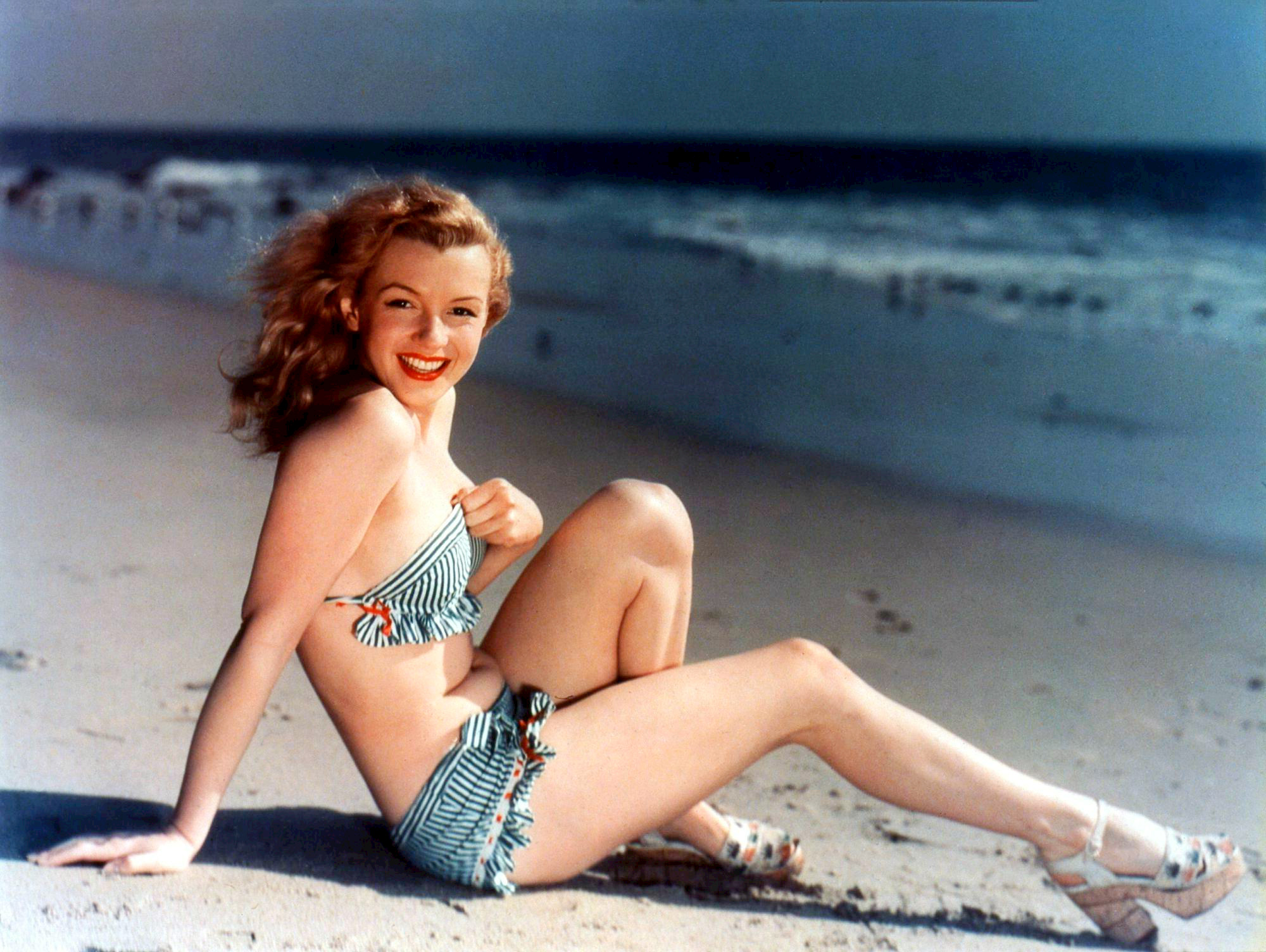
Marilyn Monroe was, according to the BBC, a "most enduring sex symbol" of Hollywood.

Popular Asian stars such as Sessue Hayakawa and Bruce Lee were considered sex symbols in Hollywood. In the late 1980s and 1990s, martial artist and actor Jean-Claude Van Damme was considered a sex symbol. Another popular sex symbol of the 1980s was actor Jon-Erik Hexum. In the 1990s, Pamela Anderson gained international recognition for her starring role of "C.J." Parker on the action drama series Baywatch, further cementing her status as a sex symbol. Similarly, co-star Carmen Electra also became a sex symbol following her fame on Baywatch. Also in the 20th century, actors such as Brad Pitt were considered sex symbols. In the 21st century, Hollywood stars such as Tom Cruise, Johnny Depp, Denzel Washington, Megan Fox, and Jessica Alba have been described as sex symbols.

In the Arab world, Hind Rostom was considered a sex symbol from a golden era of Egyptian cinema. In the late 1980s and early 1990s, Amy Yip was one of the leading sex symbols of Hong Kong cinema. Also in the 1990s, actress Ellen Chan was one of Hong Kong's most iconic sex symbols. In Hispanic media, Mexican actor Fernando Colunga is frequently referred as a sex symbol due to his telenovela roles in the 1990s. In Indian cinema, stars such as Sharmila Tagore, Zeenat Aman, Parveen Babi, Dimple Kapadia, Mallika Sherawat, Sridevi, Madhuri Dixit, and Bipasha Basu were leading sex symbols.

== Music industry ==
Musicians such as Tina Turner, Mick Jagger, Shakira, Maluma and Madonna have been described as sex symbols.

Lebanese singer Haifa Wehbe is regarded as the biggest sex symbol in Arabic pop.

Hungarian pianist Franz Liszt was regarded as a celebrity and sex symbol in the 19th century.

== Sports ==
In sports, many female athletes have become sex symbols. Young males often prioritise female athletes' physiques over their performance. Women are more likely to show more skin than men. With Sports Illustrated (a magazine which had started issuing its annual Sports Illustrated Swimsuit Issue in 1964) being a main competition for ESPN The Magazine, ESPN launched The Body Issue in 2009. The Body Issue caused controversies regarding perceived sexual objectification. Sex appeal of female athletes is often used to promote their sport. During a Dan Patrick interview, Hope Solo expressed her concern over marketing of female athletes after she did The Body Issue.

== Fictional sex symbols ==
Rotten Tomatoes states that the 1930s cartoon character Betty Boop is "the first and most famous sex symbol on animated screen". Jessica Rabbit (voiced by Kathleen Turner) from the 1988 live-action/animation crossover film Who Framed Roger Rabbit has been described as a sex symbol as well. Video games have had several characters who are considered sex symbols, such as Lara Croft, who has had several appearances in mainstream media.

In online fandoms, certain fictional characters may gain great popularity as sex symbols, particularly on the website Tumblr. On Tumblr, these characters are known as "Sexymen", and are notable for having substantially large followings. In addition, they are often the subject of large quantities of fan art and are often shipped with other characters. Examples of Sexymen in Tumblr fandoms include the Once-ler as depicted in the 2012 Lorax film, as well as Sans from the video game Undertale. Sans in particular is considered to be the most popular Sexyman, having beaten other characters such as Arataka Reigen from the manga Mob Psycho 100 in a poll that gained the attention of Toby Fox, the creator of Undertale.

Similarly, in otaku communities, characters from anime or manga that fans find sexually or romantically attractive are referred to as "waifus" (female) or "husbandos" (male).

== See also ==
- Bombshell (slang)
- Sex kitten
- Bimbo
- Himbo
- Pin-up model
- Matinée idol
- Sexual objectification
- Panicats
