= Lola Melnick =

Soviet and Ukrainian dancer (born 1982)

Lola Melnyk
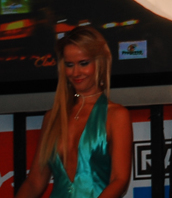
- Melnyk in 2007
- Born: Olga Ivanova Melnyk; 29 October 1982 (age 43); Odessa, Soviet Ukraine, Soviet Union
- Other name: Lola Melnick
- Citizenship: Ukrainian; Chilean (since 2009)
- Occupations: Dancer, TV host, model
- Years active: 1990–present

Olga "Lola" Melnyk (born Olga Ivanova Melnyk; 29 October 1982), is an Ukrainian-Chilean dancer, television personality, and model of Russian background who made most of her career in Argentina, Chile, and currently in Brazil, where she is based since the late 2000s.

== Biography ==
Melnick was born to a Russian family in Odessa, Soviet Ukraine. Her father was a diplomat. When she was 14, the family moved to France, where she learned French and English. She eventually learned to speak Spanish and Portuguese as well.

== Career ==
Early in her career, Melnick was a dancer in Argentina. In the late 2000s, she met Brazilian talk show host Jô Soares in Chile, who invited her for an interview, making her famous in Brazil. She was then hired by Rede Bandeirantes and worked as a reporter in the carnival program Band Folia. From 2011 on, she has worked for SBT as a talent judge, reporter, and interviewer. She was the cover of Issue 475 of Playboy Brazil, from December 2014.
