= Pânico na TV =

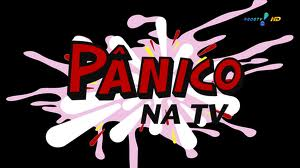
- Also known as: Programa Pânico
- Genre: Comedy
- Created by: Emílio Surita; Marcos Chiesa; Tutinha
- Presented by: Emilio Surita
- Country of origin: Brazil
- Original language: Portuguese
- No. of seasons: 8

Production
- Camera setup: Multi-camera
- Running time: 150 minutes

Original release
- Network: RedeTV!
- Release: September 28, 2003 – March 4, 2012

Related
- Pânico na Band

Pânico na TV (English: Panic on TV) was a Brazilian comedy program shown on RedeTV! on Sundays. It's the television version of the original radio program called Pânico. After its debut on TV (September 28, 2003), the program has become famous throughout Brazil. The show moved to Rede Bandeirantes in 2012 as Pânico na Band, staying on air until its cancellation in 2017.

The program Pânico on the Radio has existed since 1993 on Jovem Pan. The idea of doing a different program came about from the owner of the Jovem Pan radio station Antonio Augusto Amaral de Carvalho, known as Tuta. He thought about doing a radio program inspired by the American broadcaster Howard Stern, and thus created Pragrama Radio Pânico, presented by Emílio Surita,10 years later after its great success with the radio audience estimated at seventeen million listeners, divided among 749 municipalities, which created the program Pânico na TV.

== Cast ==
- Sabrina Sato
- Marcos Chiesa
- Ceará
- Márvio Lúcio (Carioca)
- Daniel Zukerman
- Rodrigo Scarpa (Repórter Vesgo)
- Christian Pior
- Marcelo Harada (Gluglu)
- Charles Henriquepédia

=== Recurring Crew Members ===
A large number of actors participated in the show.

- Rodrigo Pereira - Satirized Amy Winehouse, in the former framework Momento Amy Winehouse
- Robinho - A midget called Nestor and dressed as the soccer player Robinho. Merchan Neves (Carlos Alberto da Silva) used to slap his head and scream "Pedala Robinho!!". The catchphrase became a national phenomenon.
- Tevez - Another midget, José, dressed as the Argentine soccer player Carlos Tevez. Merchan Neves used to slap his head and scream "Samba Tevez!!!". Like "Pedala Robinho", "Samba Tevez" became a phenomenon.
- Homem-Grito - Tyson, a fat black man, assumes the name of Homem-Grito ("The Scream Man"). Tyson loudly screams in people's ears. He is also known as Makelele, and sometimes participates painted all in silver in the sketch of "Amaury Dumbo" alongside César Polvilho and Carioca.
- Amanda Ramalho - Participates only on the Radio Show. She's a thin, depressed and sarcastic young girl. She loves to criticize everyone at every opportunity.
- Vesgo and Silvio - Maybe the most popular segment of the show in which the couple of celebrity reporters Vesgo (Rodrigo Scarpa) and Sílvio Santos (Wellington Muniz) enter (usually, without invitation) celebrity parties and assorted events to interview the famous or wannabes, to ask funny question about them.

One of the show's trademarks, the Crab Dance, was created in this sketch.

- Dramaturgy Pânico - In this sketch, Bola (Marcos Chiesa), Eduardo Sterblitch and Bolinha interprets famous artists dramatizing some odd (and usually painful) famous TV scenes and movie scenes like Avatar, Saw, X-Men and others of varied styles.
- Jô Suado - Parody of the program Jô Soares, played by Márvio Lúcio. In the program, Jô interviews various celebrities, interacts with the waiter Arex (Marcelo Harada), tells jokes sent to the Twitter of the program and still gets a musical guest. The segment is full of puns on the names of the artists concerned and the end is made a play on the catchphrase "Kiss from the Fat", ending the segment. There is the sextet in the frame, being replaced by a pianist, though occasionally an actor dressed as Bira be seen in the segment.

== Panicats ==
The show has on the stage during all the skits and segments a group of women dressed in bikinis and dancing. Some famous Panicats are:

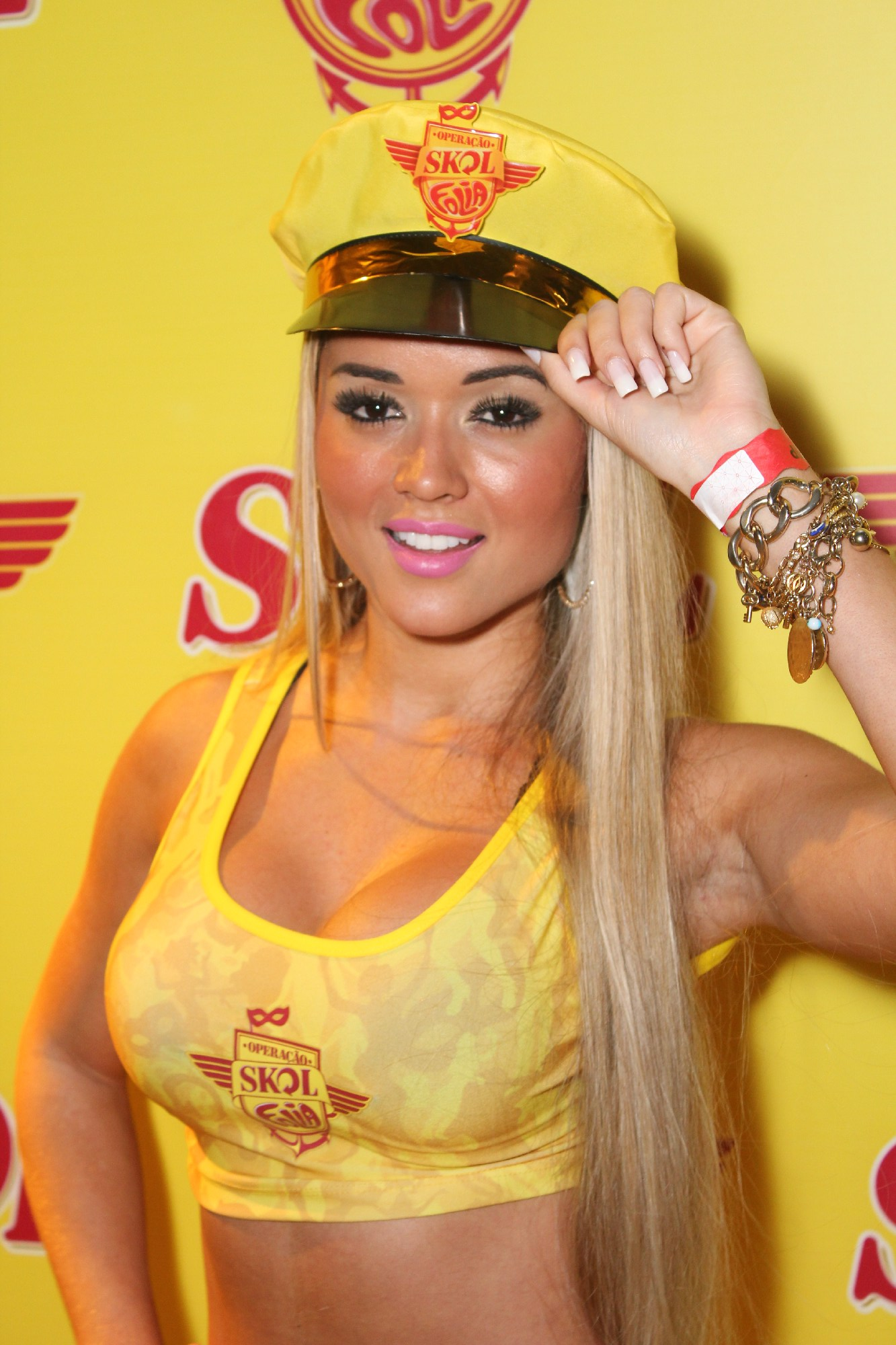
Aryane Steinkopf

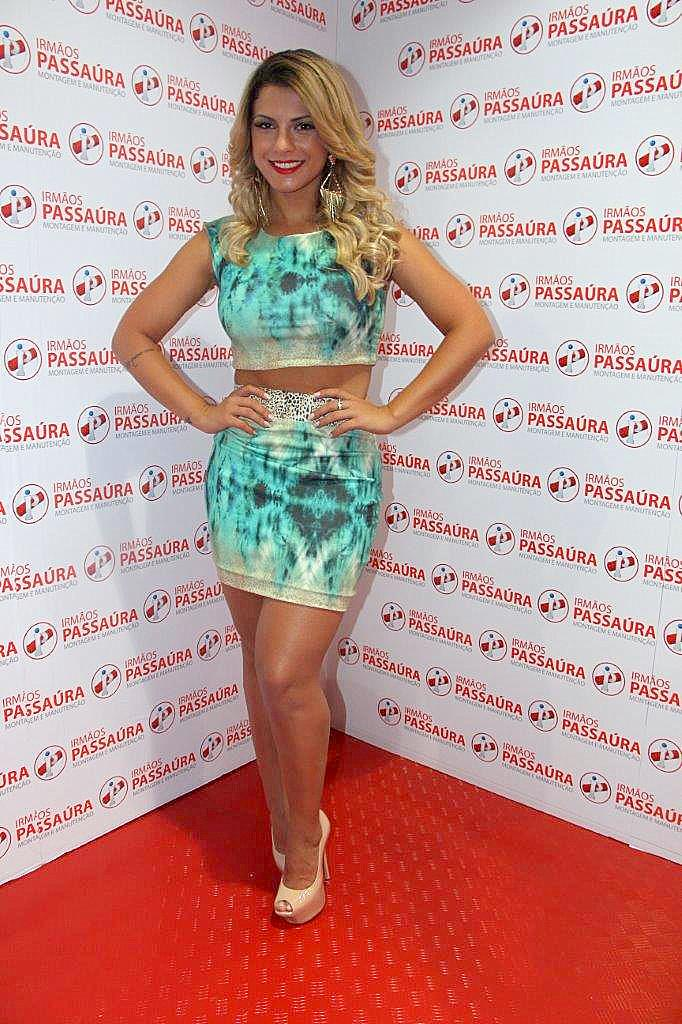
Babi Rossi

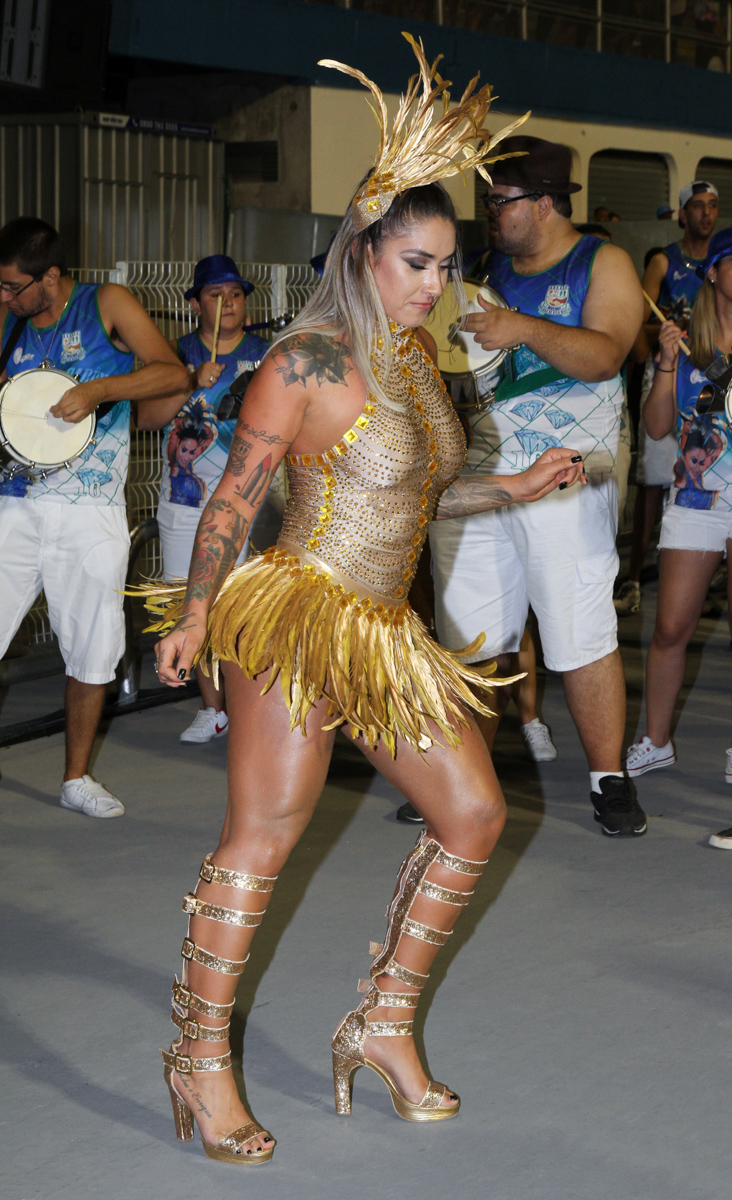
Dani Bolina

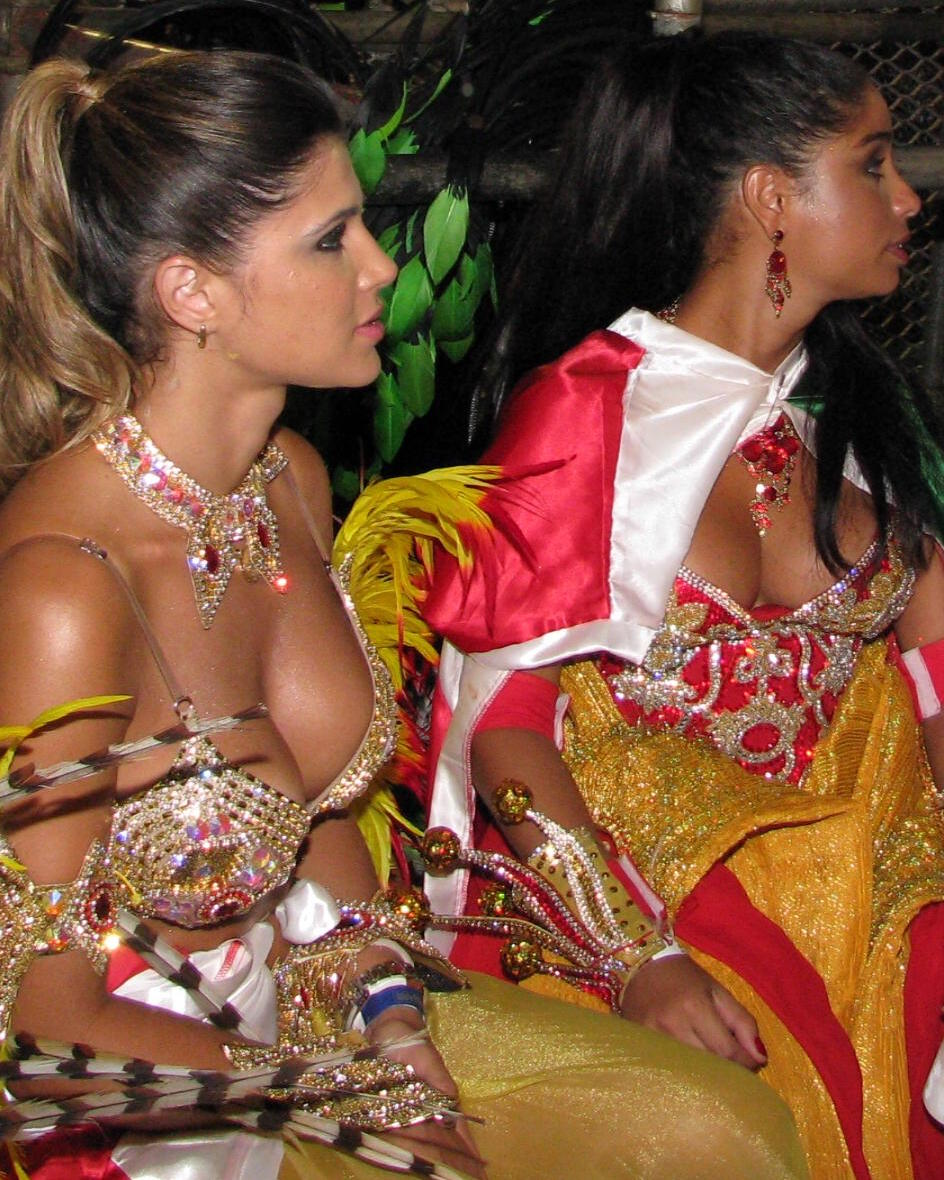
Danielle Souza

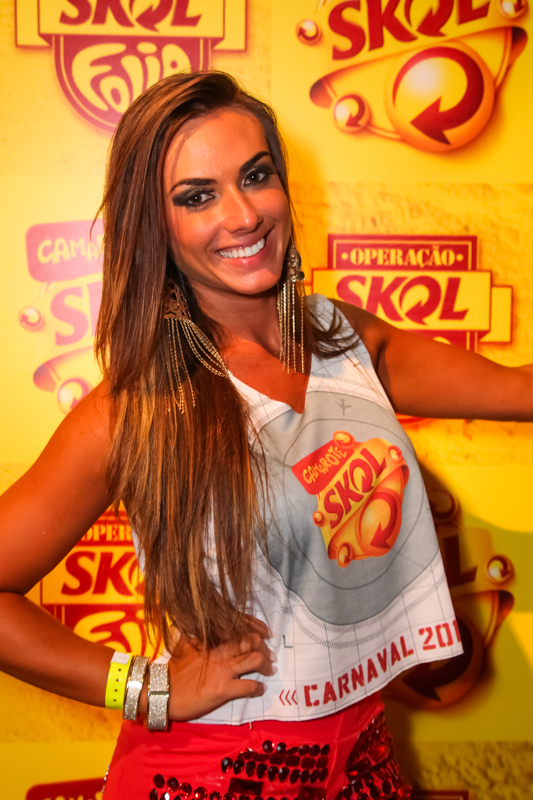
Nicole Bahls

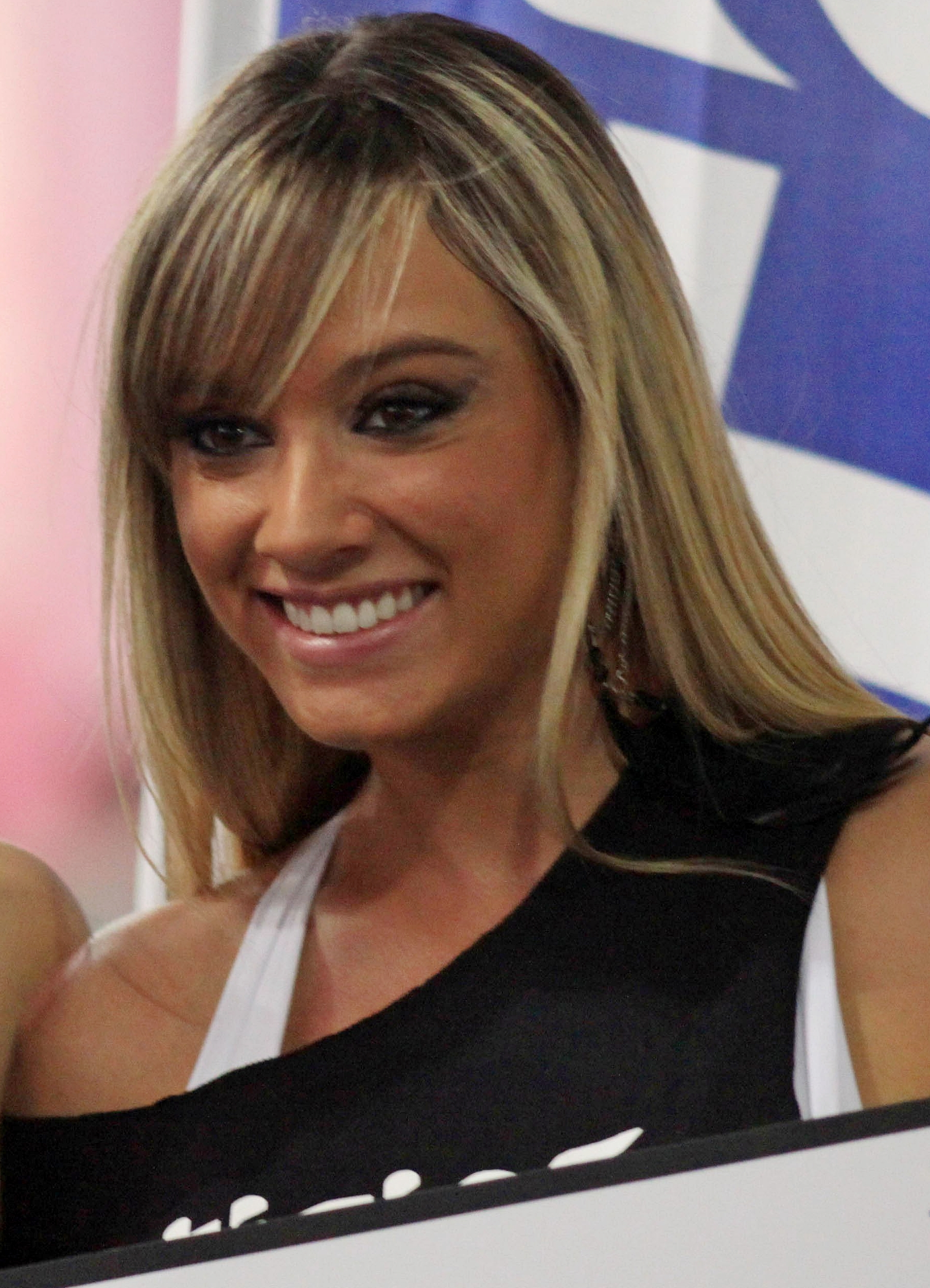
Juju Salimeni

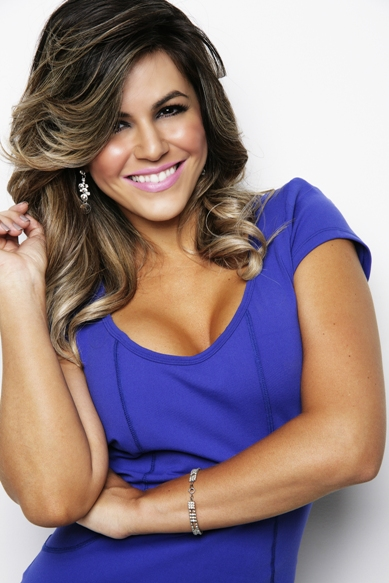
Tânia Oliveira

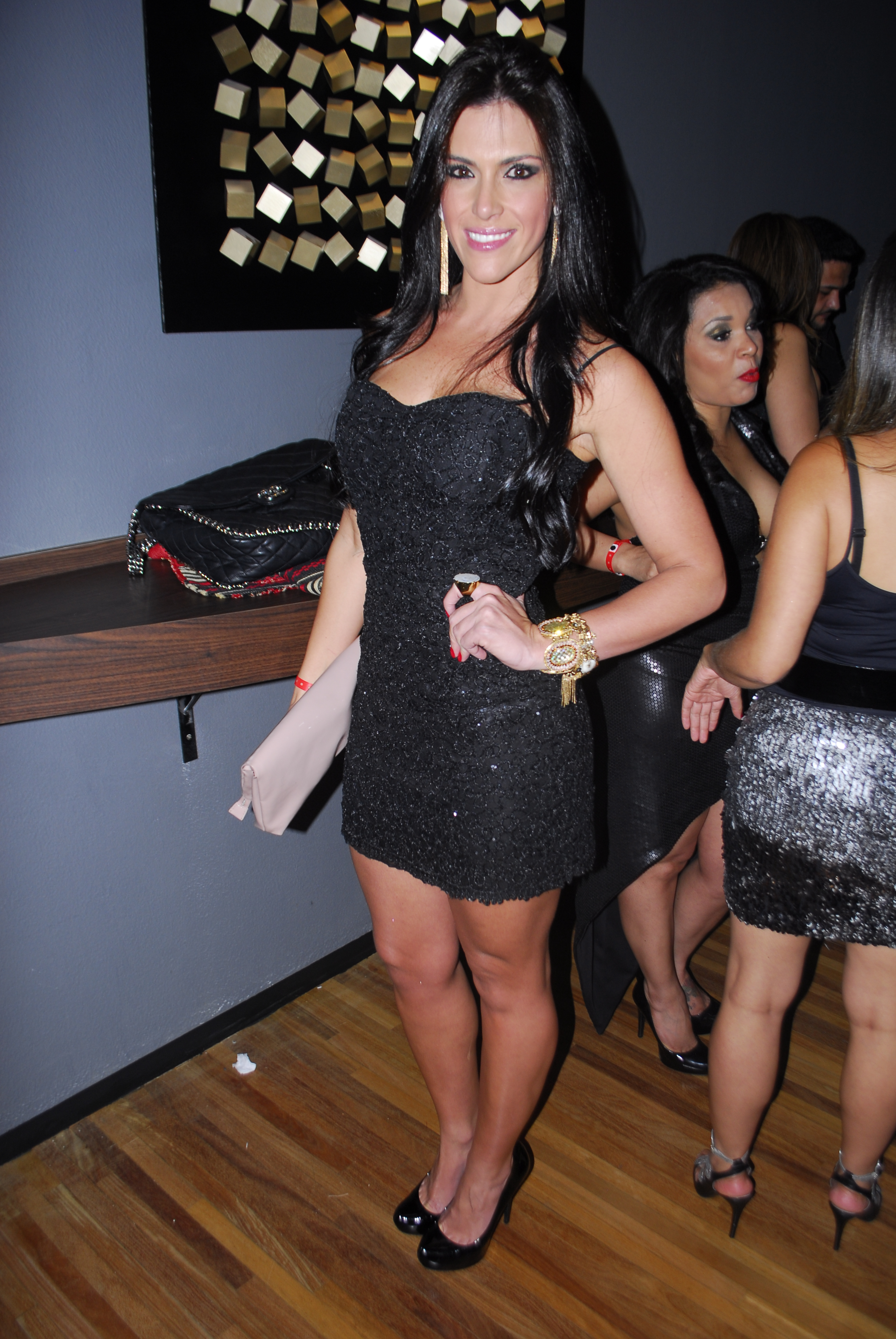
Vanessa Zotth

== Controversy and criticism ==
- Since its inception the program has collected controversy, frequently because of jokes of bad taste and its emphasis on half-naked women, called "stage assistants". For the latter, the program was struck with a lawsuit that forbade it from going on air at its initial timeslot (6 p.m., being pushed to 8 p.m. instead). Other lawsuits include the famous actresses Luana Piovani and Carolina Dieckmann.
- Brazilian soap opera actor Victor Fasano struck a violent blow on reporter Vesgo (Rodrigo Scarpa) after the latter made a pun with the actor's name, saying "it was while since they met." Scarpa was also punched by singer Netinho de Paula after a similar encounter.
- In 2009, RecordTV and SBT fought a long war for celebrities. The dispute started when Record began to negotiate the hiring of Gugu Liberato, host of Domingo Legal. In retaliation, SBT hired 11 professionals at the Barra Funda station, among them, the entrepreneur and presenter Roberto Justus and presenter Eliana. Panico took advantage of the situation and decided to prank other stars. The prank would be applied by Wellington Muniz (as Silvio Santos), who would try to hire these professionals by phone. On this list were Théo Becker (actor), Paulo Henrique Amorim (journalist), Ana Maria Braga and Jô Soares (both presenters on Rede Globo). Ana Maria discovered the scam and wisely decided to successfully prevent the airing of her hazing. Rede Globo requested clarification of the presenter in the scam.
- On October 28, 2009, a member of Panico, Marcos da Silva Heredia (Zina), was arrested for possession of cocaine. The comedian was released the same day.
- On January 16, 2010, Marcos da Silva Heredia was re-arrested for illegal possession of a firearm.

== Notable moments ==
- In 1993 Premiere of the Pânico radio program, broadcast by Jovem Pan. Transmitted Monday to Friday from 12:00 p.m. to 2:00 p.m.
- September 28, 2003 Premiere of the Brazilian television program Pânico na TV, the television station Remember!. Transmitted live on Sundays from 9:00 p.m. to 11:00 p.m.
- In 2005 Ceará and Vesgo interviewed the presenter and businessman Silvio Santos for the first time. Sílvio was interviewed for more than 15 minutes in front of Jassa Coiffeur where he signed an agreement that stated Ceará could imitate him for another two years.
- Sabrina was hospitalized for three months after falling on her back during the segment "Lingerie in Danger". This part of the show was then cancelled. In August 2007, Sabrina returned to the program.
- In 2007 Vesgo and Ceará went to Los Angeles in the United States to meet Silvio Santos, so that Ceará would be allowed to continue using his name in the program. Silvio Santos was interviewed in Los Angeles for more than 20 minutes, then renewed the contract for another two years and also the double Silvio tried to persuade him to join in the "dance of the crab."
- A player from Argentina Varzeano was found guilty of acting violently towards Ceará during a recording. The Argentine took a stand on Ceará, who fell to the ground and while trying to stop his fall, supported the weight of his body on his left wrist, breaking it.
- The gate of the Rede Globo building closed on the head of the Reporter Vesgo cutting deeply into the skin of his ear, which had to be closed with many stitches.
- The eggplant-Man, a character that is characterized by talking on the cell phone in slippers, wearing speedos with an eggplant inside, debuted at the end of 2005 with the task of filling empty spaces in the program. The theme of the framework is called Because I Got High (Afroman).
- The Reporter Vesgo (Rodrigo Scarpa) came to invade the sidelines of the 6th edition of Big Brother Brazil, and entered the house, but for a short time, was soon caught by the security of the station.
- Recently, while running seven-time Formula 1 champion Michael Schumacher was in Brazil for the last Grand Prix of the 2006 season, "Silvio Santos" and the reporter Vesgo handed him a plastic turtle (purchased for R$11.20), naming the turtle Rubens. The scene sparked laughter from Schumacher, and fury from Rubens Barrichello. The episode ran in countries like India, China, Bahrain, Australia, Germany, England, France, Canada and Argentina and brought some fame to the program, at least within Brazil. The British newspaper Daily Telegraph has a short profile of Vesgo Reporter. The manufacturer claimed that the sales of the turtles, after the appearance of the toy in Panico na TV, increased significantly.
- Vesgo and Silvio went to the wedding of Brazilian actress Eliana with the chef and host Edu Guedes. After they were denied entry to the wedding, they managed to hide in the trunk of a car and get in. The only celebrity interviewed was the show host Hebe Camargo, the bride's matron of honor.
- Panico created the "Robert" term, which would be given to a person who does everything to appear.
- In one episode, the Reporter Vesgo showed the backstage dressing room of a hostess also from RedeTV!, Luciana Gimenez. When the door of the dressing room was open, the signal transmission of the station was cut.
- After taking part in the crab dance, the sports journalist Galvão Bueno was criticized by Globo, having pronounced the name of the dance at the Pan American Games in 2007, after the players of the Brazilian National Team basketball interpreted the dance to celebrate their victory.
- In the program of September 21, 2008, Silvio and Vesgo went to Mexico and visited the "Circo de Kiko", belonging to the actor Carlos Villagrán, interpreter of Kiko on the show "El Chavo del 8" (known in Brazil as "Chaves"). The following week, an interview with Villagrán was granted, who won a square ball (always mentioned by Kiko on the show). The cast of the program was characterized as the characters from the Mexican series: Emilio Surita as Prof. Girafales, Wellington Muniz as Kiko, Rodrigo Scarpa as "El Chavo"/"Chaves", Cesar Polvilho as Don Ramón/Seu Madruga, Marcos Chiesa as Don Barriga/Seu Barriga, Danielle Souza as Doña Florinda, Sabrina Sato as Chilindrna/ Chiquinha Márvio Lucio as Doña Clotilde, Daniel Peixoto as Popis and Paulo Serra as "El Chapulín Colorado"/"Chapolin".
- In the episode for the work-related accident prevention day, the entire cast of the program appeared to be injured and patched up: Emilio appeared with a black eye and the other with a dressing, Ball's head was plastered, Fern had one arm broken and in a cast, and Tania Oliveira was in a wheelchair.
- On March 29, 2009, the members of Panico presented the program by the light of lanterns in protest, as what happened two days before in a worldwide event to save the planet, the postcards, the world's most famous lighting was turned off, some of them are: the Statue of Liberty in New York, the Colosseum in Rome and the Taj Mahal in India. Brazil participated for the first time this event turning out the lights of Christ the Redeemer in Rio de Janeiro, and Cable-Stayed Bridge in São Paulo.
- In April 2009, Carioca (Márvio Lucio), characterized as "Molusco", a parody of the then President Luiz Inácio Lula da Silva, spread larvae and eggs of Aedes Aegypti in the Argentinean capital of Buenos Aires, supposedly starting an epidemics of Dengue fever with at least 130 cases.
- The sticker: Ronaldo! (in which appears a Corinthian, Marcos da Silva Heredia the "Zina", which is a tribute to Ronaldo, saying only: Ronaldo! And "Shine on" in "Corinth") made and still thrives. Zina (the Poet of one word, so called by Panico) won one of this program: getting face to face with his idol (Ronaldo himself) in the Pacaembu stadium and realized his dream: a home win. And not to mention that Zina won a contract on Rede TV!.
- On July 12, 2009, under The Impostor, Daniel Zukerman performed the exploit to circumvent security at the funeral of Michael Jackson, entering the gym Staples Center without tickets and without a wrist band and then managed to enter the Forest Lawn cemetery, where the funeral restricted to the family of Michael took place
- Still referring to the table The Impostor, the mission titled Attack of the Mosquitos (which had to inform all participants of the updates, such as the death of Michael Jackson, the departure of Gugu to Record and Roberto Justus and Eliana to SBT), Daniel Zukerman tried to storm the studios of "Farm", on Rede Record, Itu (SP). In the first attempt (by land), Daniel tried to enter through the main gate of the studio fooling the guards, but one of the guards recognized him and called the police. The second attempt (by air), it worked (please note that the airspace is restricted to the farm), but Record was granted an injunction in court prohibiting the display of images of the farm. If the program did not comply with this order, it would pay a fine of R$500,000.00 to Rede Record.
- At the end of 2009 Panico had a contract with RedeTV!, and many other networks were interested in the program. Rede Globo offered Friday nights, SBT offered Sunday night, and Rede Record Sunday afternoons. But the cast of the show decided to renew the contract with Rede TV for an additional three years.

=== Awards ===
- APCA – (2003)
- Melhores e Piores – (2004)
- Troféu Imprensa – (2004)
- Troféu Imprensa – (2005)
- Troféu Imprensa – (2006)
- Troféu Imprensa – (2007)
- Meus Premios Nick – (2009)
- SuperCap de ouro – (2009)
- Capricho Awards 2009 – (2009)
