= Rio Shore series 3 =

Rio Shore - É Coisa De Novela
- Season 3
- No. of episodes: 12

Release
- Original network: MTV; Paramount+
- Original release: 15 June – 31 August 2023

Season chronology
- ← Previous; Series 2 Next → Series 4

The third series of Rio Shore, a Brazilian television programme based in Rio de Janeiro was begun on June 15, 2023, on MTV. It was filmed in February 2023. The cast was revealed in May 2023, half of the cast from the previous season not returning to the show. Six new cast members are introduced for the first time, including Beatriz Valença, Helena Steigne, Leonardo Carvalho, Matheus Miranda and Thiago Hippólito.

This was the last season to feature Maryane Valim after leaving the show. Brazilian television personality Jojo Todynho was featured as the head of the season. Jessica Barros returns to the show after leaving at the end of the previous season.

== Cast ==
- Jessica Barros (Episodes 8–12)
- Leonardo Carvalho
- Juliana "Mississippi" Casaes
- Matheus "Novinho" Crivella
- Guilherme Evaristo
- Cristal Felix
- William Guimarães
- Thiago "Thippo" Hippólito
- Daniele Japa
- Matheus Miranda
- Ricardo "Rick" Salusse
- Helena Steigne
- Beatriz "Triz" Valença
- Maryane Valim (Episodes 1–5)

=== Duration of cast ===
Name	Episodes											
Name	1	2	3	4	5	6	7	8	9	10	11	12
Beatriz												
Cristal												
Daniele												
Guilherme												
Helena												
Jessica												
Juliana												
Leonardo												
Maryane												
Matheus C												
Matheus M												
Ricardo												
Thiago												
William												

= Cast member is featured in this episode.
= Cast member arrives in the house.
= Cast member returns to the house.
= Cast member leaves the series.
= Cast member returns to the series.
= Cast member does not feature in this episode.
= "Cast member" is not a cast member in this episode.

== Episodes ==
No. overall	No. in season	Title	Original release date
25	1	"Episode 1"	June 15, 2023
Veterans and rookies meet at Shore's new mansion, there have been many kisses and some disagreements. The family enjoys the first hangover of summer and is surprised by the arrival of the new Chief.
26	2	"Episode 2"	June 22, 2023
27	3	"Episode 3"	June 29, 2023
The Shores receive a visit from Boss Jojo Todynho and soon after, conflicts escalate in the mansion. After a day and night full of fights, the family discusses an issue that could change the course of the summer.
28	4	"Episode 4"	July 6, 2023
The Shores receive a visit from Boss Jojo Todynho and soon after, conflicts escalate in the mansion. After a day and night full of fights, the family discusses an issue that could change the course of the summer.
29	5	"Episode 5"	July 13, 2023
Mary and Triz leave the tense atmosphere in the house. The party night ends in a fight, after a reckoning, the girls go out to relax. A member comes to the mansion to stay.
30	6	"Episode 6"	July 20, 2023
31	7	"Episode 7"	July 27, 2023
A disagreement between Guilherme and Matheus changes the course of the summer for one of them; one part of the family receives visitors, while the other works; Jojo Todynho appears with unexpected plans.
32	8	"Episode 8"	August 3, 2023
Jessica arrives to shake up the family structures and the Shores enjoy a party at the mansion, with a show by MC Mirella and guests from "De Férias com o Ex".
33	9	"Episode 9"	August 10, 2023
34	10	"Episode 10"	August 17, 2023
Japa creates disagreements at night with the family; Jessica and Novinho flirt and she surprises everyone on a hot night that echoes through the four corners of the mansion.
35	11	"Episode 11"	August 24, 2023
On the last day of work, the family enjoys Pepê's Kiosk after hours and Triz is once again the target of comments in the mansion. The Shores are invited to a lively pool party.
36	12	"Episode 12"	August 31, 2023
The Shores enjoys one of the hottest afternoons of the summer. The last night in the mansion is full of emotions and full of events, such as fights, kisses, reconciliations and even a date request.
