= Rio Shore series 2 =

Rio Shore
- Season 2
- No. of episodes: 12

Release
- Original network: MTV; Paramount+
- Original release: 9 June – 19 July 2022

Season chronology
- ← Previous; Series 1 Next → Series 3

The second series of Rio Shore, a Brazilian television programme based in Rio de Janeiro was confirmed on 15 February 2021. It was filmed in January and February 2022 in Joá. The first sneak peek of the season was released on April 28, 2022. This is the first series to include fourth new cast members, including Aoxi, Cayo Rodrigues, Maryane Valim and William Guimarães. The show began on June 9, 2021.

Patrick was kicked out of the season during the third episode after he physically assaulted another cast member. Kevin Jolsan and Juliana Casaes returned to the show after leaving it in the previous season.

Brazilian television personality Rico Melquiades was featured as the head of the season. He also has other supporting cast members, including Gabriella Boto and Stephanie Nader.

== Cast ==
- Aoxi
- Vitória Araújo
- Jéssica Barros
- Juliana "Mississippi" Casaes (Episodes 5–12)
- Matheus "Novinho" Crivella
- Guilherme Evaristo
- Cristal Felix
- Natallia Formaggeri
- William Guimarães
- Kevin Jolsan (Episodes 8–12)
- Cayo Rodrigues
- Patrick Salles (Episodes 1–3)
- Ricardo "Rick" Salusse
- Maryane Valim

=== Duration of cast ===
Name	Episodes											
Name	1	2	3	4	5	6	7	8	9	10	11	12
Aoxi												
Cayo												
Cristal												
Guilherme												
Jéssica												
Juliana												
Kevin												
Maryane												
Matheus												
Natallia												
Patrick												
Ricardo												
William												
Vitória												

= Cast member is featured in this episode.
= Cast member arrives in the house.
= Cast member returns to the house.
= Cast member leaves the series.
= Cast member is removed from the series.
= Cast member returns to the series.
= Cast member does not feature in this episode.
= "Cast member" is not a cast member in this episode.

== Episodes ==
No. overall	No. in season	Title	Original release date
13	1	"Episode 1"	June 9, 2022
Not all boys meet. The presence of the novices brings joy and strangeness. Jessica is surprised to be in love with her, something that not everyone approves of. Novinho reinforces the hierarchy, Nat and Jéssica avoid inviting Gui and Cristal to the mansion.
14	2	"Episode 2"	June 14, 2022
Jessica and Nat get mad at Cristal and Gui. Rick has a match. Gui and Cristal start a big secret. The new Boss already gives the first work scale. Nat gets involved with Cayo, as well as Novinho and Aoxi. Patrick oscillates between love and hate.
15	3	"Episode 3"	June 16, 2022
Patrick's madness has consequences. Nat celebrates her birthday. Will and Cristal continue with their secret, Aoxi notices Vic's discomfort with Novinho. The house pressures Will, Mary, Cayo and Nat to make up their minds so there is no chaos.
16	4	"Episode 4"	June 21, 2022
Mary is jealous of Will and everyone doesn't give a shit. While some work, others go to walking classes. Novinho and Aoxi have DR, Nat lashes out, irritating Novo. Cayo is jealous of Will and Nat and the family enjoys a Turma do Pagode show.
17	5	"Episode 5"	June 23, 2022
Mary and Will have sex and she has a crush on the boy. Novinho and Aoxi have more DR. Rico wants to meet Rio and the Shores take him to the Salgueiro court, where Rick bumps into the Boss. Mississippi finally arrives, causing horror.
18	6	"Episode 6"	June 28, 2022
Nat and Cayo detach. Mary continues to be jealous of Will, Mississippi shows how sneaky she is. Cristal and Gui are almost discovered, Will and Mary try to define their relationship. Jessica introduces the boy to her family and has a chance to catch up!
19	7	"Episode 7"	June 30, 2022
Groping, shenanigans, and competitions run wild. Mississippi gets attached and worries Will. Gui and Cristal are discovered. The Shores go clubbing, Will and Natallia get jealous, it all ends in a fight, and the family returns home angry at Will.
20	8	"Episode 8"	July 5, 2022
Will goes on a rampage at the most anticipated party, the house turns against him. Mississippi, who gossiped about Mary, tastes her own poison. Cayo gets scared and doesn't know how to deal with Natralha. Kevin invites everyone for a walk, but Jessica is not happy at all.
21	9	"Episode 9"	July 7, 2022
Cayo and Novinho get estranged during their stay in Búzios. Kevin tries to get around Jessica's discomfort with his presence, but Shore is not open to conversation... and neither is work.
22	10	"Episode 10"	July 12, 2022
The family can no longer handle Jessica's emotional roller coaster and decides to take action. Natallia blows up the couple Guilherme & Cristal and also with Cayo, her current crush.
23	11	"Episode 11"	July 14, 2022
Lipe Ribeiro and Beefsteak arrive to rock the Shore family's end of summer and win over Natallia and Will. Mary refuses to give up her bed for Will and Beefsteak to sleep together and Victoria decides to buy the fight.
24	12	"Episode 12"	July 19, 2022
To end the season in style, the Shore family takes a boat ride, eats lunch at their favorite spot, and enjoys the MC Don Juan show at the mansion with their guests.
