= Wilhelm Steinkopf =

German chemist (1879–1949)

Prof. Dr. rer. nat. Georg Wilhelm Steinkopf
- Born: 28 June 1879; Staßfurt, Province of Saxony, Prussia, German Empire
- Died: 12 March 1949 (aged 69); Stuttgart, Württemberg-Baden, Germany
- Education: Technische Hochschule Karlsruhe
- Occupation: Chemist
- Organization: Kaiser Wilhelm Institute for Physical Chemistry and Elektrochemistry
- Known for: Production of mustard gas
- Spouse(s): Anna Petra Eleonore Steinkopf, née. Heizler (1875–1931)
- Children: Sofie Elise Steinkopf (born 1903)
- Parent(s): Gustav Friedrich Steinkopf (1842–1899), merchant Elise Steinkopf, née. Heine (1841–1886)

Georg Wilhelm Steinkopf (28 June 1879 – 12 March 1949) was a German chemist. Today he is mostly remembered for his work on the production of mustard gas during World War I.

== Life ==
Georg Wilhelm Steinkopf was born on 28 June 1879 in Staßfurt, in the Prussian Province of Saxony in the German Empire, the son of Gustav Friedrich Steinkopf, a merchant, and his wife Elise Steinkopf (née Heine).

In 1898 he began studying chemistry and physics at the University of Heidelberg. In 1899 he moved to the Technische Hochschule Karlsruhe (today the Karlsruhe Institute of Technology), where he finished his studies with a degree as Diplomingenieur in 1905. In Karlsruhe, he also met his future colleagues Fritz Haber and Roland Scholl. After receiving his Doctor of Science and eventually his Habilitation in 1909, he worked as an associate professor at the TU Karlsruhe until 1914, when he volunteered for service in World War I.

In 1916 Fritz Haber, who was now the director of the Kaiser Wilhelm Institute for Physical Chemistry and Electrochemistry (KWIPC, today the Fritz Haber Institute of the Max Planck Society) in Berlin, invited Steinkopf to join his institute as the head of a team devoted to research on chemical weapons. Together with chemical engineer Wilhelm Lommel, Steinkopf developed a method for the large-scale production of bis(2-chloroethyl) sulfide, commonly known as mustard gas. Mustard gas was subsequently assigned the acronym LOST (LOmmel/STeinkopf) by the German military.

Steinkopf's work on mustard gas and related substances had a negative impact on his health, which caused him to switch to another department of the KWIPC in 1917, supervising the production of gas ammunition.

Although Fritz Haber wanted him to stay in Berlin, Steinkopf moved to Dresden after the end of World War I. Succeeding Reinhold von Walther as the associate professor in organic chemistry at the Technische Universität Dresden, he worked there from 1919 until his retirement. His research focussed on organic arsenic compounds, thiophene compounds, and the formation of petroleum.

In 1924, Steinkopf became a member of the Beirat des Heereswaffenamts (Heereswaffenamt advisory council), an agency of the German military responsible for weapons research and development. He worked under strict secrecy and most of his friends and colleagues in Dresden did not know about this activity.

After the Machtergreifung of the National Socialists in 1933, Reichswehrminister Werner von Blomberg demanded the Saxonian Volksbildungsministerium (Ministry of the People's Education) to show more recognition for Steinkopf's work during World War I. In 1935, Steinkopf was promoted to full professor, and continued to work at the TU Dresden until his retirement in 1940.

His health being fragile due to his work with mustard gas and related substances, Steinkopf died on 12 March 1949 in Stuttgart.

Aside from his scientific research, Steinkopf wrote several poems, novellas, and novels.

== Notable works ==
=== Scientific ===
- Houben, Heinrich (1921). Methoden der organischen Chemie [Methods of Organic Chemistry] (in German) (2nd ed.). Leipzig: Georg Thieme Verlag. LCCN agr21001067. OCLC 2190257. Steinkopf was a co-author of this book.
- Steinkopf, Wilhelm (1941). Die Chemie des Thiophens [The Chemistry of Thiophene] (in German). Dresden/Leipzig: Verlag Theodor Steinkopff. LCCN 44000009. OCLC 1027347.

=== Fiction ===
- Steinkopf, Wilhelm (1924). Berglieder [Mountain Songs] (in German). Karlsruhe: Badenia Verlag. OCLC 72406011.
- Steinkopf, Wilhelm (1925). Ingeborg von der Linde [Ingeborg of the Linden Tree] (in German). Berlin: M. Warneck. LCCN af47000819. OCLC 635671770.
- Steinkopf, Wilhelm (1928). Die zur Höhe wandern [Those Who Climb to the Heights] (in German). Berlin: M. Warneck. OCLC 55183724.
- Steinkopf, Wilhelm (1930). Der Riedershofbauer (in German). Berlin: M. Warneck. OCLC 250078953.
- Steinkopf, Wilhelm (1938). Eckberg der Flieger [Eckberg the Pilot] (in German). Dresden: Wodni & Lindecke. OCLC 64287157.

=== Non-fiction ===
- Steinkopf, Wilhelm (1932). Vom wunderbaren und sonderbaren Sterben meiner liebsten Frau [About the Miraculous and Curious Death of my Beloved Wife] (in German). Dresden: M. Warneck.
