= Nicole Bahls =

Brazilian model and television presenter

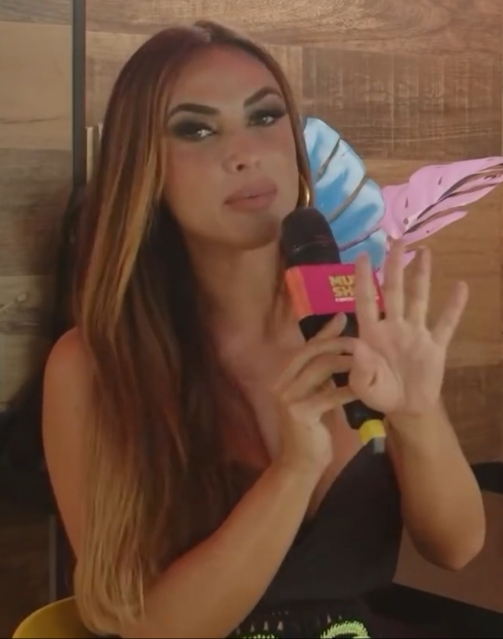
- Bahls in 2022
- Born: Nicole Mariana Bahls; 15 November 1985 (age 40); Londrina, Paraná, Brazil
- Occupations: Model, actress, television presenter
- Spouse: Marcelo Bimbi (m. 2018; div. 2021)
- Modeling information
- Height: 1.75 m (5 ft 9 in)
- Hair color: Brown
- Eye color: Brown
- Website: eunicolebahls.com.br

Nicole Mariana Bahls (born 15 November 1985) is a Brazilian model, actress and television presenter.

== Career ==
Nicole Bahls came to fame after winning a beauty contest of the sports news Globo Esporte (Rede Globo), called "Musa do Brasileirão", where women represented a football team from Brazil. Nicole was a contestant for Paraná Clube.

She achieved further fame debuting as panicat in 2009 on the TV show Pânico na TV. In 2011, Nicole was fired by the show's producers after public fights with her fellow panicat Juliana Salimeni, who was also fired.

In 2010, Nicole did a nude photoshoot for the Brazilian edition of Playboy magazine, being on the cover of the October issue.

In April 2013, Bahls was hired by Band and she joined the Pânico na Band. She worked as a member of the main cast and served as a reporter for the comedy television show, but in early 2015 it was confirmed that she was out.

=== A Fazenda ===
On May 29, 2012, Nicole Bahls was officially announced as one of the sixteen celebrity contestants on the fifth season of A Fazenda, the Brazilian version of reality series The Farm, which aired on Rede Record.

On August 26, 2012, after 90 days, she was evicted from the show against eventual winner Viviane Araújo, finishing in fourth place, in the most anticipated eviction of the season, which was billed by many viewers and critics the "real final" of the season.

== Biography ==
Bahls was born in Londrina, Paraná. She is the daughter of Vera and Sérgio Bahls, a businessman and director of Rede Sanepar.

On February 1, 2016, she got engaged to the model Marcelo Bimbi.

== Filmography ==
=== Television ===
Year	Title	Role	Note
2007	Musa do Brasileirão	Herself (contestant)	
2009–2011	Pânico na TV	Herself (stage assistant)	
2012	A Fazenda 5	Herself (contestant)	
2012	Programa da Tarde	Herself (entertainment reporter)	
2013	Fazenda de Verão	Herself (guest)	
2013–2014	Pânico na Band	Herself (entertainment reporter)	
2015	Corpo em Forma	Herself (host)	
2016–2018	Ferdinando Show	Herself (stage assistant)	
2017	A Fazenda 9	Herself (contestant)	
2018	Dra. Darci	Herself	Episode: "Aqui Nunca"
2019	Samantha!	Herself	Episode: "2.1"
2019	Power Couple Brasil	Participant (Winner)	Season 4
2021	Drag Me as a Queen	Herself	Season 3
2024	Colônia Bahls	Herself (presenter)	Season 1
2025	Scars of Beauty	Herself	Episode 34
2025	Dança dos Famosos	Herself (contestant)	Season 22
2026	Rio Shore	Herself (hostess)	Season 4

=== Film ===
Year	Title	Role
2015	Superpai	Cueca's girlfriend
2019	Correndo Atrás	Kátia
