= Jovem Pan News =

Brazilian news radio network

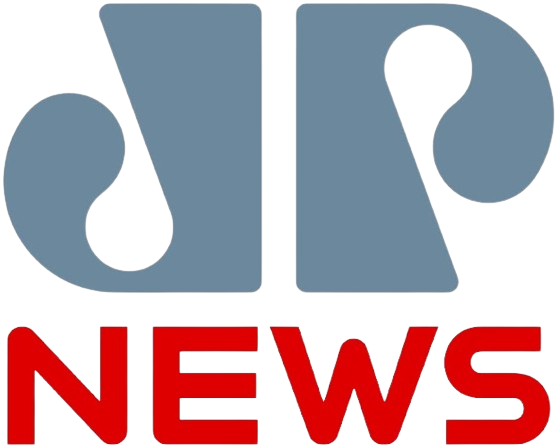
- Type: Broadcast radio network
- Country: Brazil
- Headquarters: São Paulo, São Paulo

Programming
- Language: Portuguese
- Format: All news

Ownership
- Owner: Rádio Panamericana S/A
- Parent: Grupo Jovem Pan
- Sister stations: TV Jovem Pan News; Jovem Pan FM; Classic Pan

History
- Founded: 7 October 2013 by Antônio Augusto Amaral de Carvalho Filho

Links
- Website: jovempan.uol.com.br/jpnews

Jovem Pan News is a far-right, pro-US Brazilian news radio network belonging to the Grupo Jovem Pan. It was created on October 7, 2013, as an all news radio project, with 24-hour journalistic programming, as well as sports and entertainment broadcasts.

== Description ==
Jovem Pan, a radio network based in São Paulo, began broadcasting via satellite in 1994. Jovem Pan radio in São Paulo, a mainly journalistic station, had partial programming broadcast to various affiliates across the country, as well as broadcasting programs in conjunction with Jovem Pan FM, its music radio station. With the announcement that the then President of the Republic, Dilma Rousseff, would sanction a decree in which AM stations would migrate to the FM radio band, Jovem Pan presented a new news radio project, Jovem Pan News, which would expand journalistic programming and create a pattern of affiliates, like its segment competitors CBN and BandNews FM.

Initially, its broadcasts were made in an experimental format via the internet on the Jovem Pan Online portal, which at the time was hosted by UOL. From midnight on December 2, 2013, the project began to gain traction on the Brazilian dial, with the inclusion of AM radio stations in Brasília and São José do Rio Preto, both owned by Jovem Pan.

Over time, the network began to invest more and more in the production of audiovisual content, initially with regular broadcasts via YouTube. In 2020, the entire output of Jovem Pan News was consolidated as video content with the launch of Panflix, its own streaming platform. In 2021, radio programming becomes almost entirely the content of the new TV Jovem Pan News, a news channel initially distributed via pay-TV.
