= Steinkopf (Fulda valley) =

Mountain in Germany

Coordinates: 51°24′15″N 9°33′30″E

Highest point
- Elevation: 250 m (820 ft)

Geography
- Location: Hesse, Germany

Steinkopf is a hill in Hesse, Germany.
