= Aryane Steinkopf =

Brazilian model

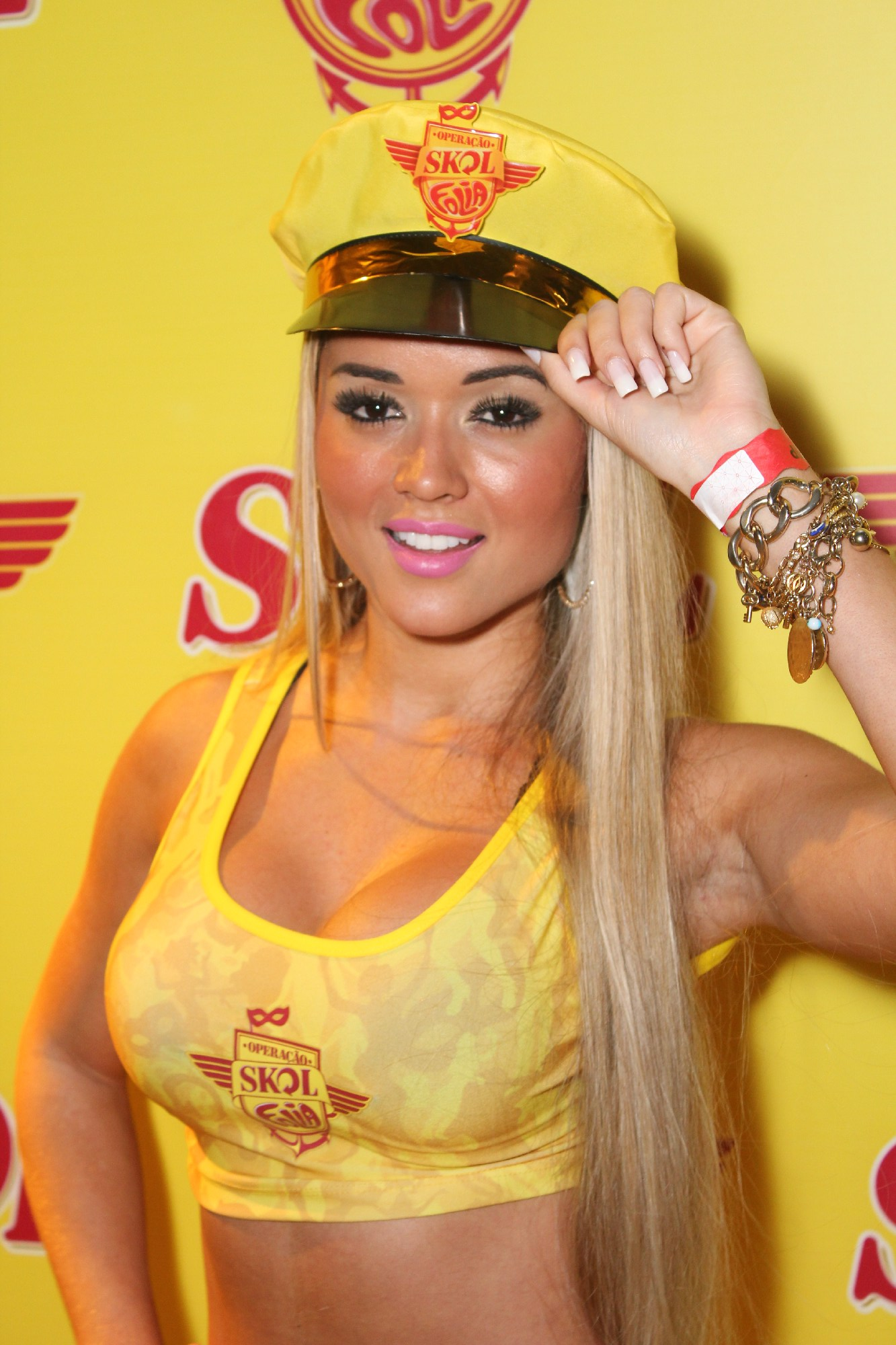
- Born: December 14, 1987 (age 38); Vila Velha, Espírito Santo, Brazil
- Occupation: Model
- Spouse: Beto Malfacini (m. 2014)
- Modeling information
- Height: 1.67 m (5 ft 6 in)
- Hair color: Blonde
- Eye color: Brown

Aryane Steinkopf Malfacini (born December 14, 1987) is a Brazilian model and nutritionist. She became known nationally for being panicat of the Pânico na TV programme.

== Career ==
=== As a model ===
On July 3, 2011, she made her debut as a panicat in the TV show "Pânico na TV" of RedeTV! Before, she had already participated in the program on the board "Xurupita's Farm 2", and reconciled modeling with the career of nutritionist (she graduated in nutrition in 2010 from Vila Velha University). In March 2012, she was fired in the middle of the holidays along with Jaque Khury and Babi Rossi after the change of program to the Band.

In February 2012, she was cover of VIP magazine where it was mentioned as "The most perfect of Pânico". In April 2012, she was cover of Playboy magazine. With sales record of 2012, was chosen to stamp the cover of the special edition of December. Also cover the DVD with the best making of the year (the magazine is sold along with the DVD).

Still in 2012, she was chosen by the Internet users of Portal Virgula as the best butt of the present time. In September, she posed for a Labellamafia brand campaign. In the same month, the Angolan singer Adi Cudz released on YouTube the music video "Já Não Quero Olhar", with the participation of the model.

In 2013, she participated in the sixth season of the reality show A Fazenda, where she was eliminated in the third week with 48% of the votes to stay.

She is currently a post-graduate student in Maternal and Child Health and dedicates herself exclusively to nutrition and the maternal world. She idealized the nutritional plan for pregnant "NutriMama Guide".

=== As ring girl and DJ ===
In December 2011, she was a ring girl at the "WFE Platinum" MMA event in Salvador.

In March 2013, besides being ring girl in the first edition of MMA Champions League, she also was the official DJ of the event.

In March 2014, to commemorate a year in the career of DJ, she did a photo essay.

== Personal life ==
When she entered the reality show Fazenda 6, she had been dating for seven years with her manager Wellington Junior, but ended up engaging a romance with model Beto Malfacini. She married Beto on October 13, 2014, in Espírito Santo. On September 30, 2016, she gave birth to her first child named Aarão.
