= Luciano do Valle =

Brazilian sports commentator, television presenter, journalist and entrepreneur

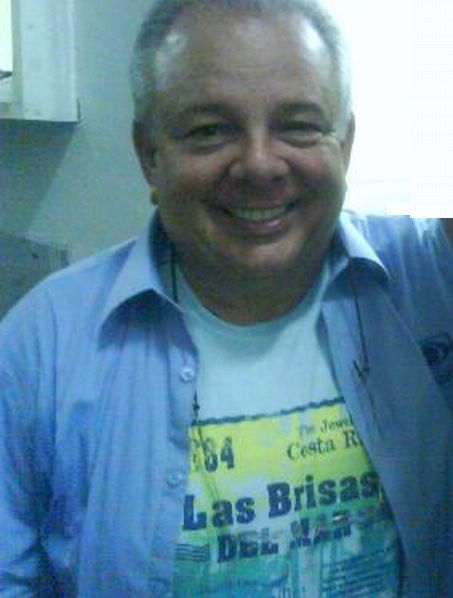
- Luciano do Valle in May 2008.
- Born: Luciano do Valle Queirós; 4 July 1947; Campinas, São Paulo, Brazil
- Died: 19 April 2014 (aged 66); Uberlândia, Minas Gerais, Brazil
- Occupations: sports commentator, television presenter, journalist entrepreneur

Luciano do Valle Queirós (4 July 1947 – 19 April 2014) was a Brazilian sports commentator, television presenter, journalist and entrepreneur. He worked on several broadcasts on television—Rede Globo from 1971 to 1982, Rede Record from 1982 to 1983 and 2003 to 2006, and Rede Bandeirantes from 1983 to 2003 and 2006 to his death. He was born in Campinas, São Paulo.

Luciano do Valle died on the afternoon of 19 April 2014 in Uberlândia, Minas Gerais, aged 66.
