= Campo Grande (square) =

Square in Salvador

Coordinates: 12.98904°S 38.52143°W

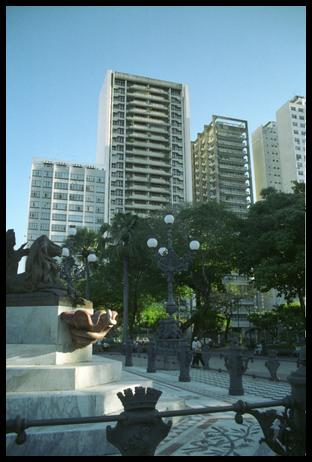
Campo Grande Square.

Campo Grande is a square located in the southern zone of Salvador, Bahia, Brazil.
