= Verlag Theodor Steinkopff =

German publishing company

- Status: Defunct (1978)
- Founded: 1908
- Founder: Theodor Steinkopff
- Defunct: 1978
- Successor: Dietrich Steinkopff
- Country of origin: Germany
- Headquarters location: Dresden
- Distribution: Worldwide
- Publication types: Books, periodicals
- Nonfiction topics: Science, Medicine

The Verlag Theodor Steinkopff was a German publishing company based in Dresden, Germany, that specialised in medical and scientific books and periodicals.

Founded by publisher Theodor Steinkopff on 1 January 1908 in Dresden, the Verlag Theodor Steinkopff put a strong focus on publications on colloid chemistry. Among its earliest publications was the Zeitschrift für Chemie und Industrie der Kolloide, today known as Colloid and Polymer Science.

In 1927, Theodor Steinkopff's son Dietrich Steinkopff entered the company, which was based in the Residenzstraße 32 in the Dresden borough of Blasewitz and had branch offices in Leipzig and Darmstadt. While the Verlag Theodor Steinkopff itself became defunct in 1978, its branch office in Darmstadt became an independent company simply named the Steinkopff Verlag. It continued to exist until 1980, when it was taken over by Springer Verlag (now Springer Science+Business Media).
