= Jovem Pan FM =

Brazilian radio network in format Top40/CHR

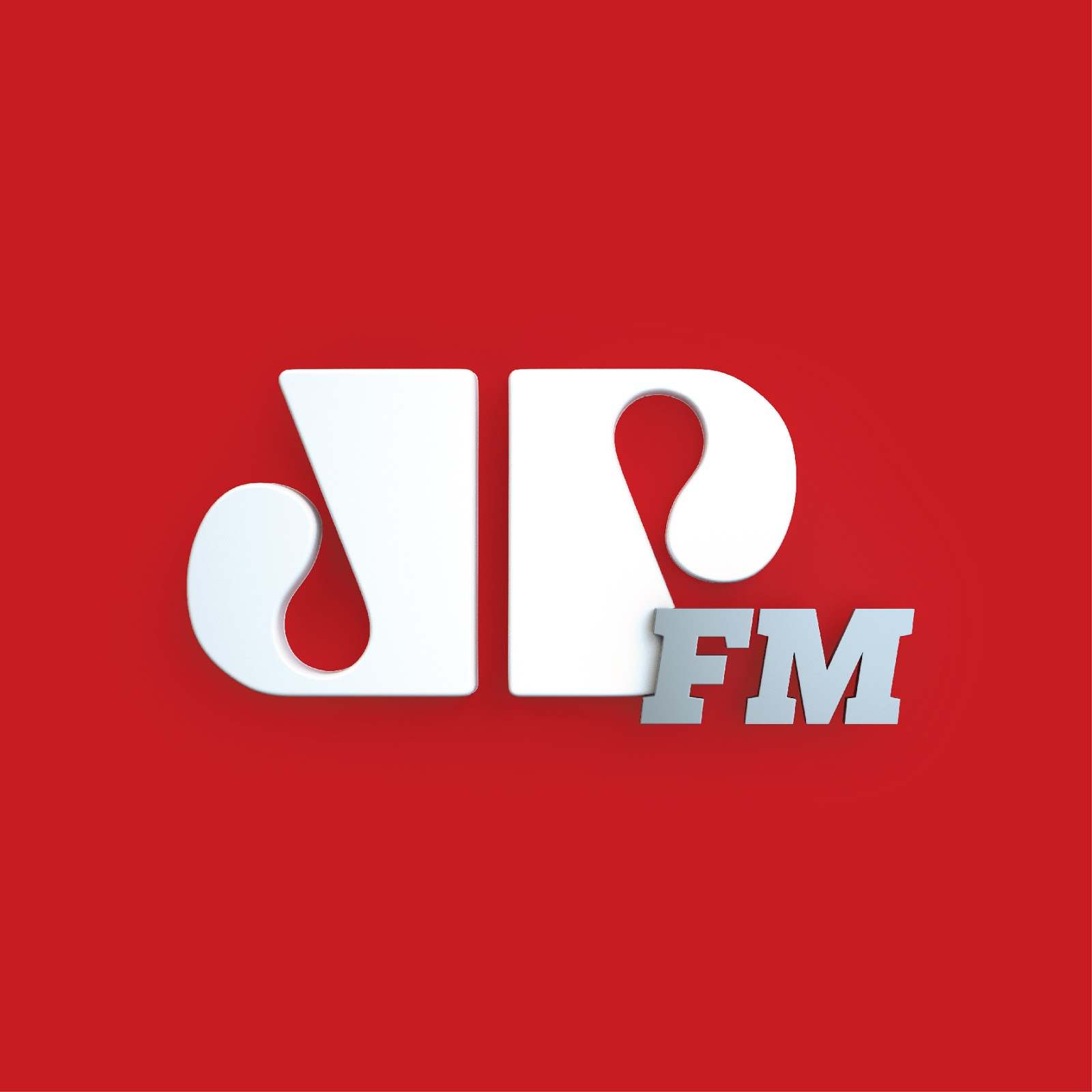
- Type: Radio Network
- Country: Brazil
- Branding: "Jovem Pan"

Programming
- Format: Top 40/CHR

Ownership
- Parent: Jovem Pan Group
- Sister stations: Jovem Pan News

History
- Launch date: April 29, 1975
- Former names: Jovem Pan 2

Links
- Website: jovempanfm.com.br

Jovem Pan FM is a Brazilian radio network with 25 million listeners and 87 broadcasters. It is the largest FM radio network in Brazil, Latin America and the Southern Hemisphere.

The name is derived from the word jovem, which means "young", and Pan-American. The latter comes from the name of Radio Panamerican, which began broadcasting from São Paulo on May 3, 1944 and was purchased in November of the same year by entrepreneur and sports executive Paulo Machado de Carvalho.

== History ==
The idea to start an FM station began with Antonio Augusto Amaral de Carvalho Filho, (better known by his nickname, "Tutinha"), and began transmitting on July 1, 1976. The name "Jovem Pan" was coined in 1965 by Tutinha's father, Paulo.

In July 1994, Jovem Pan started syndicating via satellite. The service (known as Jovem Pan SAT) currently has over 87 affiliated stations.

== Programs on Jovem Pan FM Sat ==
- Pânico: Since 1993, it is broadcast every day at 12:00. A television version was broadcast from 2003 to 2012, soon after signing with another broadcaster of radio until 2017.
- Hit Parade Brazil: Presented every Sunday from noon to 1:00. This show presents the top 20 songs as voted on by the listeners during the past week, the Top 5 current songs (with flashbacks to previous hits), the Top 5 American and European hits, the Top of the Billboard Charts and special promotions.
- The 7 Best: At random times, a block of seven hits will be played. This is followed by a contest called The Better 7 Winning Edition. Listeners who have registered for the contest are called by the DJ and asked to identify the names of the songs or the singers to win prizes. Occasionally, the listeners themselves are asked to call, with the first (or other randomly selected callers) eligible to compete.
- One after another: one hour of commercial-free music, this program is one of the most popular on this station, and is broadcast several times every day.
- In the Ballad (Na Balada): Friday, at 9:00 PM, with contributions from the local DJs. On Saturday, the program is called Special In the Ballad, with DJs from the broadcast division of Jovem Pan.
- Morning on Pan: Every morning, the local announcer presents news and music, with the Best of the Week.
- Youth Connection Pan: A short, recurring feature that presents the latest celebrity gossip.
- Pan News: A short, recurring feature that presents the top stories in Brazilian and world news.
- Jurassic Pan: In two editions, one before and one after the program listed below. The show presents flashbacks to the greatest hits of the past.
- Early Morning Newspaper on Pan: From 5:00 to 6:00 in the morning, the program is presented on both FM and AM. It is also transmitted in the USA as Good Morning América, featuring a summary of world news.
- The Best Of the Week: A promotion on Sunday for Hit Parade Brazil, including spots encouraging the listeners to participate in the various prize giveaways to be offered later in the week, on the station and the website.
- Worst Moments Of Panic: Presenting the best moments of Panic, every Saturday.
- Planet DJ: A dance program featuring house, techno and other genres, every afternoon, following Panic, with a shorter version on Sunday later the Hit Parade Brazil.
