= Joá =

- Neighborhood
- Location in Rio de Janeiro Joá (Brazil)
- Coordinates: 23°00′31″S 43°17′15″W
- Country: Brazil
- State: Rio de Janeiro (RJ)
- Municipality/City: Rio de Janeiro
- Zone: Southwest Zone

Population (2022)
  - Total: 983

Joá is a neighborhood in the Southwest Zone of Rio de Janeiro, Brazil.
