= Pânico na Band =

- Also known as: Programa Pânico
- Genre: Comedy
- Created by: Emílio Surita; Marcos Chiesa; Tutinha
- Directed by: Allan Rapp; Marcelo Picón
- Presented by: Emílio Surita
- Narrated by: Emilio Surita
- Theme music composer: Rick Bonadio
- Opening theme: Você precisa de amor
- Country of origin: Brazil
- Original language: Portuguese
- No. of seasons: 6

Production
- Camera setup: Multi-camera
- Running time: 180 minutes
- Production company: Jovem Pan

Original release
- Network: Band
- Release: April 1, 2012 – December 31, 2017

Related
- Pânico na TV (2003–2012)

Pânico na Band (English: Panic (Note: The translation of Pânico na Band to English is Panic on the Band, but the show is named Panic by Rede Bandeirantes for English reference. Rede Bandeirantes is known as "Band".)) was a Brazilian comedy television show broadcast originally by the Band network from April 1, 2012 until December 31, 2017, produced in a partnership between Band and Jovem Pan, the latter being the owner of the show's format. This is the second television version of the radio show Pânico, succeeding Pânico na TV, which was broadcast by RedeTV! between 2003 and 2011.

== Seasons ==
The Pânico na Band has the same format of the older Pânico na TV, created in 2003, after the cast members of the homonym radio program wanting a greater disclosure of the show. Officially, was idealized by Antônio Augusto Amaral de Carvalho Filho (Tutinha), president of the Jovem Pan radio. Anchored by Emílio Surita, the show has the help of Marcos Chiesa, Wellington Muniz, Rodrigo Scarpa, Márvio Lúcio, Evandro Santo, Eduardo Sterblitch, Daniel Zukerman, Amanda Ramalho, Daniel Peixoto, Guilherme Santana, Fernanda Lacerda.
