= Jovem Pan =

Brazilian media conglomerate

- Type: Media conglomerate
- Country: Brazil
- Headquarters: São Paulo, São Paulo, Brazil

Programming
- Format: Top 40/CHR/All News

Ownership
- Owner: Carvalho family
- Parent: Rádio Panamericana S/A
- Key people: Antônio Augusto do Amaral Carvalho Filho (President); Marcelo Carvalho (Vice President)

History
- Launch date: May 3, 1944

Coverage
- Availability: Brazil

Links
- Webcast: Listen Live
- Website: jovempan.com.br

Jovem Pan (also known as Grupo Jovem Pan) is a Brazilian media conglomerate based in São Paulo, Brazil. It consists of a commercial radio and television network with programming focused on journalism, entertainment, and sports broadcasts. The group operates the radio stations Jovem Pan FM and Jovem Pan News, the television channel Jovem Pan News, and the streaming service Panflix.

Jovem Pan has the largest network of radio stations in Brazil, Latin America, and the southern hemisphere, and it is one of the biggest radio stations in the world. The network has several bureaus, 109 affiliated stations all over Brazil. Jovem Pan broadcasts through satellite digital quality sound reaching more than 25 million listeners, and throughout the world by the Internet. Therefore, Jovem Pan is one of the most important media companies in the history of the communications industry in Brazil.

== History ==
=== 1940s ===
Paulo Machado de Carvalho left the station in 1942, going to Rádio Record. The general direction was then assumed by Antonio Augusto Amaral de Carvalho (Tuta), current director president of REDE JOVEM PAN SAT, that at that time was only 21 years old. In that same year, Panamericana left São Bento Street and went to the 275 Riachuelo Street.

=== 1950s ===
Years later, in 1953, Tuta left the broadcasting station to dedicate himself to TV Record, channel 7 of São Paulo, who were beginning transmissions. In 1954, Panamericana moved again to 713 Avenida Miruna, in the neighborhood of the Airport, where the Group of United Broadcasting stations resided.

=== 1960s ===
In 1964, still linked to TV Record, Antonio Augusto Amaral de Carvalho assumed the direction of the broadcasting station again. The name Jovem Pan appeared in 1965, given by Paulo Machado de Carvalho. The great transformation of Panamericana began in 1966, under the direction of Tuta. Already with the name of Jovem Pan, to radio it began several programs with idols of the Brazilian popular music that, at that time, they made great success in TV Record. The journalistic programs were created in 1970, 71 and 72, period in that they appeared the Team Seven and Thirty, the Newspaper National Integration and, finally, the Newspaper of the Morning, that is a reference in the journalism of radio in every country until today.

=== 1970s ===
In 1973, Antonio Augusto Amaral de Carvalho left TV Record to dedicate himself exclusively to Rádio Jovem Pan. In that same year, he acquired the actions of the siblings' broadcasting station Paulo Machado of Carvalho Filho and Alfredo de Carvalho, becoming its only proprietor. In 1976, Jovem Pan left the avenue Miruna and is now situated at 807 Avenida Paulista. In the same year, Jovem Pan FM was inaugurated, located in the same place.

=== 2020s ===
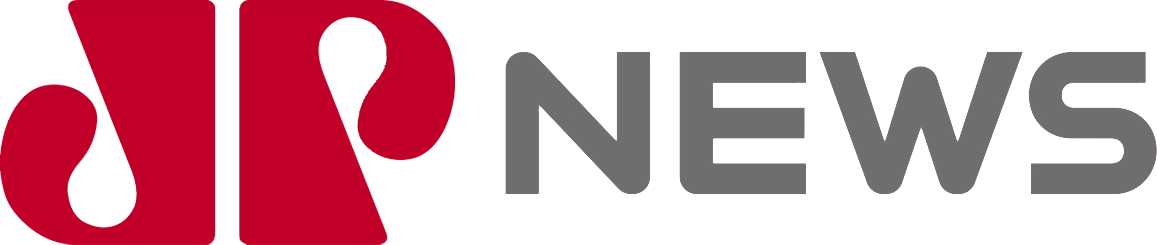
Logo Jovem Pan News TV

It was described in 2021 as Brazil's largest conservative radio station.

On 27 October 2021, the Joven Pan Group launched a pay-TV news channel.

Jovem Pan News has been described as practicing partisan reporting in favor of the Republican Party, the Jair Bolsonaro administration, and conservative causes.

=== Acquisition of 50% of Rede Mais Família ===
On July 14, 2026, the column by Flávio Ricco and Luiz Henrique Oliveira on the LeoDias news portal reported that Grupo Jovem Pan was in the process of acquiring a 50% stake in the operations of Rede Mais Família, a broadcaster owned by businessman Rinaldi Faria, a former consultant and artistic and programming superintendent at SBT. The negotiations, which had been kept confidential for months, represent a strategic step toward transforming Jovem Pan into a nationwide over-the-air television network.

== Jovem Pan FM stations ==
=== Alagoas ===
- Jovem Pan FM - Maceió - 102,7 MHz

=== Amazonas ===
- Jovem Pan FM - Manaus - 104,1 MHz

=== Bahia ===
- Jovem Pan FM - Salvador - 91,3 MHz
- Jovem Pan FM - Barreiras - 89,5 MHz
- Jovem Pan FM - Eunápolis - 90,3 MHz
- Jovem Pan FM - Feira de Santana - 100,9 MHz

=== Ceará ===
- Jovem Pan FM - Fortaleza - 94,7 MHz
- Jovem Pan FM - Jijoca de Jericoacoara - 91,7 MHz

=== Distrito Federal ===
- Jovem Pan FM - Brasília - 106,3 MHz

=== Espírito Santo ===
- Jovem Pan FM - Vitória - 100,1 MHz

=== Goiás ===
- Jovem Pan FM - Goiânia - 106,7 MHz
- Jovem Pan FM - Caldas Novas - 105,7 MHz

=== Maranhão ===
- Jovem Pan FM - São Luís - 102,5 MHz

=== Mato Grosso ===
- Jovem Pan FM - Cuiabá - 90,9 MHz
- Jovem Pan FM - Rondonópolis - 102,9 MHz
- Jovem Pan FM - Barra do Garças - 91,1 MHz
- Jovem Pan FM - Sinop - 93,1 MHz
- Jovem Pan FM - Lucas do Rio Verde - 102,3 MHz

=== Mato Grosso do Sul ===
- Jovem Pan FM - Campo Grande - 95,3 MHz
- Jovem Pan FM - Coxim - 90,3 MHz
- Jovem Pan FM - Três Lagoas - 104,5 MHz

=== Minas Gerais ===
- Jovem Pan FM - Belo Horizonte - 99,1 MHz
- Jovem Pan FM - Araxá - 93,5 MHz
- Jovem Pan FM - Cataguases - 105,7 MHz
- Jovem Pan FM - Ipatinga - 102,3 MHz
- Jovem Pan FM - Montes Claros - 93,5 MHz
- Jovem Pan FM - Muriaé - 98,7 MHz
- Jovem Pan FM - Passos - 96,9 MHz
- Jovem Pan FM - Varginha - 107,3 MHz
- Jovem Pan FM - Uberaba - 103,7 MHz
- Jovem Pan FM - Patos de Minas - 103,3 MHz
- Jovem Pan FM - Poços de Caldas - 90,9 MHz

=== Paraíba ===
- Jovem Pan FM - João Pessoa - 102,5 MHz

=== Paraná ===
- Jovem Pan FM - Curitiba - 103,9 MHz
- Jovem Pan FM - Londrina - 102,9 MHz
- Jovem Pan FM - Maringá - 101,3 MHz
- Jovem Pan FM - Ponta Grossa - 103,5 MHz
- Jovem Pan FM - Foz do Iguaçu - 93,3 MHz
- Jovem Pan FM - Cascavel - 101,5 MHz
- Jovem Pan FM - Arapoti - 103,1 MHz
- Jovem Pan FM - Guarapuava - 96,1 MHz
- Jovem Pan FM - União da Vitória - 98,3 MHz

=== Pernambuco ===
- Jovem Pan FM - Recife - 95,9 MHz
- Jovem Pan FM - Caruaru - 101,3 MHz

=== Rio de Janeiro ===
- Jovem Pan FM - Três Rios - 92,9 MHz
- Jovem Pan FM - Itaperuna - 91,3 MHz

=== Rio Grande do Norte ===
- Jovem Pan FM - Natal - 89,9 MHz

=== Rio Grande do Sul ===
- Jovem Pan FM - Porto Alegre - 90,7 MHz
- Jovem Pan FM - Osório - 103,1 MHz
- Jovem Pan FM - Passo Fundo - 106,9 MHz
- Jovem Pan FM - Bento Gonçalves - 92,5 MHz

=== Santa Catarina ===
- Jovem Pan FM - Florianópolis - 101,7 MHz
- Jovem Pan FM - Rio do Sul - 93,9 MHz
- Jovem Pan FM - Blumenau - 88,7 MHz
- Jovem Pan FM - Chapecó - 94,1 MHz
- Jovem Pan FM - Criciúma - 104,3 MHz
- Jovem Pan FM - Itajaí - 94,1 MHz
- Jovem Pan FM - Joaçaba - 103,9 MHz
- Jovem Pan FM - Joinville - 91,1 MHz
- Jovem Pan FM - Tubarão - 94,9 MHz

=== São Paulo ===
- Jovem Pan FM - São Paulo - 100,9 MHz
- Jovem Pan FM - São José do Rio Preto - 93,1 MHz
- Jovem Pan FM - Apiaí - 92,5 MHz
- Jovem Pan FM - Araçatuba - 104,3 MHz
- Jovem Pan FM - Jaboticabal - 107,3 MHz
- Jovem Pan FM - Itapetininga - 100,7 MHz
- Jovem Pan FM - Itapeva - 91,7 MHz
- Jovem Pan FM - Presidente Prudente - 101,7 MHz
- Jovem Pan FM - Santa Fé do Sul - 92,5 MHz
- Jovem Pan FM - São Carlos - 88,5 MHz
- Jovem Pan FM - Tupã - 89,5 MHz
- Jovem Pan FM - Campinas - 89,9 MHz
- Jovem Pan FM - São José dos Campos - 94,3 MHz
- Jovem Pan FM - Sorocaba - 91,1 MHz
- Jovem Pan FM - Ribeirão Preto - 93,1 MHz
- Jovem Pan FM - Santos - 95,1 MHz
- Jovem Pan FM - Piracicaba - 103,1 MHz
- Jovem Pan FM - Taubaté - 98,3 MHz
- Jovem Pan FM - Marília - 100,9 MHz
- Jovem Pan FM - Matão - 88,1 MHz
- Jovem Pan FM - Catanduva - 91,5 MHz
- Jovem Pan FM - Barretos - 101,5 MHz
- Jovem Pan FM - São João da Boa Vista - 95,9 MHz
- Jovem Pan FM - Barra Bonita - 97,7 MHz
- Jovem Pan FM - Bauru - 95,5 MHz
- Jovem Pan FM - Dracena - 101,5 MHz
- Jovem Pan FM - Avaré - 102,1 MHz
- Jovem Pan FM - Ourinhos - 88,9 MHz

=== Sergipe ===
- Jovem Pan FM - Aracaju - 88,7 MHz

== Jovem Pan News stations ==
=== Ceará ===
- Jovem Pan News - Fortaleza - 92,9 MHz

=== Espírito Santo ===
- Jovem Pan News - Vitória - 90,5 MHz

=== Goiás ===
- Jovem Pan News - Águas Lindas de Goiás - 107,9 MHz

=== Distrito Federal ===
- Jovem Pan News - Brasília - 750 kHz

=== Minas Gerais ===
- Jovem Pan News - Ituiutaba - 1240 kHz

=== Rio Grande do Norte ===
- Jovem Pan News - Natal - 93,5 MHz

=== Rio Grande do Sul ===
- Jovem Pan News - Imbé - 92,3 MHz

=== Santa Catarina ===
- Jovem Pan News - Florianópolis - 103,3 MHz
- Jovem Pan News - Joinville - 1250 kHz
- Jovem Pan News - Rio do Sul - 620 kHz
- Jovem Pan News - Criciúma - 101,5 MHz
- Jovem Pan News - Tubarão - 95,9 MHz

=== São Paulo ===
- Jovem Pan News - Andradina - 101,3 MHz
- Jovem Pan News - Barretos - 103,3 MHz
- Jovem Pan News - Bauru - 97,5 MHz
- Jovem Pan News - Campinas - 100,3 MHz
- Jovem Pan News - Piracicaba - 99,5 MHz
- Jovem Pan News - Pompeia - 105,7 MHz
- Jovem Pan News - Rio Claro - 106,1 MHz
