= 2013–14 Brazilian network television schedule =

2013 in Brazilian television | 2014 in Brazilian television
2011–12 | 2012–13 | 2013–14 | 2014–15 | 2015–16 | 2016–17 | 2017–18

The 2013–14 network television schedule for the five major Brazilian Portuguese commercial broadcast networks in Brazil covers primetime hours from March 2013 to February 2014.

The schedule is followed by a list per network of returning series, new series or telenovelas (soap operas), and series canceled after the 2012–13 season.

Band was the first to announce its schedule on October 16, 2012, followed by Record on March 26, 2013, then Globo on March 27, 2013 with the television special Vem aí and SBT, on March 30, 2013.

== Legend ==
Light blue indicates Local Programming.

Gray indicates Encore Programming.

Light green indicates live sporting events.

Red indicates series being burned off and other irregularly scheduled programs, including specials.

Light yellow indicates the current schedule.

== Schedule ==
- From June 15–30, 2013 part of Globo prime time programming will be preempted in favor of coverage of the 2013 Confederations Cup (something also applied to TV Bandeirantes).

=== Sunday ===
Network		7:00 PM	7:30 PM	8:00 PM	8:30 PM	9:00 PM	9:30 PM	10:00 PM	10:30 PM	11:00 PM	11:30 PM
Globo	Mid-season	Domingão do Faustão			Fantástico					Revenge	
Globo	Fall	Domingão do Faustão			Fantástico					Sai de Baixo	
Globo	Summer	Domingão do Faustão			Fantástico					Junto & Misturado	
Record	Mid-season	Programa do Gugu		Domingo Espetacular						Tela Máxima	
Record	Fall	O Melhor do Brasil		Domingo Espetacular						Tela Máxima	
SBT		Roda a Roda Jequiti		Programa Silvio Santos							
Band	Mid-season	Terceiro Tempo		Polícia 24H		Pânico na Band					
Band	Fall	Terceiro Tempo		Terceiro Tempo		Pânico na Band					
RedeTV!		O Último Passageiro	Ritmo Brasil		Te Peguei			Teste de Fidelidade			Dr. Hollywood

=== Monday ===
Network		8:00 PM	8:30 PM	9:00 PM	9:30 PM	10:00 PM	10:30 PM	11:00 PM	11:30 PM
Globo	Mid-season	Guerra dos Sexos	Jornal Nacional		Salve Jorge		Tela Quente		
Globo	Fall	Sangue Bom	Jornal Nacional		Amor à Vida		Tela Quente		
Record	Mid-season	Local Programming	Jornal da Record		CSI: NY		Balacobaco		
Record	Fall	Local Programming	Jornal da Record		CSI: NY		Dona Xepa		A Fazenda
Record	Summer	Local Programming	Jornal da Record		CSI: NY		Pecado Mortal		A Lei e o Crime
SBT	Mid-season	SBT Brasil	Carrossel		Programa do Ratinho		Astros		
SBT	Follow-up	SBT Brasil	Chiquititas	Carrossel	Programa do Ratinho		Astros		
SBT	Fall	SBT Brasil	Chiquititas		Rebelde	Programa do Ratinho		Supernatural	
Band	Fall	Jornal da Band	Show da Fé		Zoo	The Simpsons	CQC		
RedeTV!		TV Fama	RedeTV! News		International Church of God's Grace		Superpop		

=== Tuesday ===
Network		8:00 PM	8:30 PM	9:00 PM	9:30 PM	10:00 PM	10:30 PM	11:00 PM	11:30 PM
Globo	Mid-season	Guerra dos Sexos	Jornal Nacional		Salve Jorge		Tapas & Beijos		Louco por Elas
Globo	Fall	Sangue Bom	Jornal Nacional		Amor à Vida		Tapas & Beijos		Louco por Elas
Globo	Follow-up	Sangue Bom	Jornal Nacional		Amor à Vida		Tapas & Beijos		Saramandaia
Globo	Summer	Além do Horizonte	Jornal Nacional		Amor à Vida		Tapas & Beijos		Pé na Cova
Record	Mid-season	Local Programming	Jornal da Record		CSI: NY	Balacobaco		Got Talent Brasil	
Record	Fall	Local Programming	Jornal da Record		CSI: NY	Dona Xepa		A Fazenda	
SBT	Mid-season	SBT Brasil	Carrossel		Programa do Ratinho			Cine Espetacular	
SBT	Follow-up	SBT Brasil	Chiquititas	Carrossel	Programa do Ratinho			Cine Espetacular	
SBT	Fall	SBT Brasil	Chiquititas		Rebelde	Programa do Ratinho		Cine Espetacular	
Band	Mid season	Jornal da Band	Show da Fé	Zoo	The Simpsons	The Walking Dead			
Band	Fall	Jornal da Band	Show da Fé	Zoo	The Simpsons	A Liga			
RedeTV!		TV Fama	RedeTV! News		International Church of God's Grace		Feira do Riso	Luciana by Night	

=== Wednesday ===
Network		7:00 PM	7:30 PM	8:00 PM		8:30 PM	9:00 PM	9:30 PM	10:00 PM	10:30 PM	11:00 PM	11:30 PM
Globo	Mid-season	Guerra dos Sexos		Jornal Nacional		Salve Jorge			2013 Wednesday Football Night			
Globo	Fall	Sangue Bom		Jornal Nacional		Amor à Vida			2013 Wednesday Football Night			
Record	Mid-season	Local Programming		Jornal da Record			José do Egito			Balacobaco	Super Tela	
Record	Fall	Local Programming		Jornal da Record			José do Egito			Dona Xepa	A Fazenda	
SBT	Mid-season	SBT Brasil		Carrossel		Programa do Ratinho				Cante Se Puder		
SBT	Follow-up	SBT Brasil		Chiquititas	Carrossel	Programa do Ratinho				Amigos da Onça		
SBT	Fall	SBT Brasil		Chiquititas		Rebelde	Programa do Ratinho				Supernatural	
Band	Fall	Jornal da Band		Show da Fé				Pré-Jogo	2013 Wednesday Football Night			

=== Thursday ===
Network		7:00 PM	7:30 PM	8:00 PM	8:30 PM	9:00 PM	9:30 PM	10:00 PM	10:30 PM	11:00 PM	11:30 PM
Globo	Mid-season	Praça TV	Guerra dos Sexos		Jornal Nacional	Salve Jorge			A Grande Família		Pé na Cova
Globo	Fall	Praça TV	Sangue Bom		Jornal Nacional	Amor à Vida			A Grande Família		Saramandaia
Globo	Spring	Praça TV	Sangue Bom		Jornal Nacional	Amor à Vida			The Voice Brasil (10/3)		
Record	Mid-season	Cidade Alerta		Local Programming	Jornal da Record		CSI: NY	Balacobaco		Cine Maior	
Record	Fall	Cidade Alerta		Local Programming	Jornal da Record		CSI: NY	Dona Xepa		A Fazenda	
SBT	Mid-season	That's So Raven	Local Programming	SBT Brasil	Carrossel		Programa do Ratinho			A Praça é Nossa	
SBT	Follow-up	That's So Raven	Local Programming	SBT Brasil	Chiquititas	Carrossel	Programa do Ratinho			A Praça é Nossa	
SBT	Fall	That's So Raven	Local Programming	SBT Brasil	Chiquititas		Rebelde	Programa do Ratinho		A Praça é Nossa	
Band	Fall	Local Programming	Jornal da Band		Show da Fé	Zoo	The Simpsons	Polícia 24H			

=== Friday ===
Network		7:00 PM	7:30 PM	8:00 PM	8:30 PM	9:00 PM	9:30 PM	10:00 PM	10:30 PM	11:00 PM	11:30 PM
Globo	Mid-season	Praça TV	Guerra dos Sexos		Jornal Nacional	Salve Jorge			Globo Repórter		
Globo	Fall	Praça TV	Sangue Bom		Jornal Nacional	Amor à Vida			Globo Repórter		
Record	Mid-season	Cidade Alerta		Local Programming	Jornal da Record		CSI: NY	Balacobaco		Câmera Record	
Record	Fall	Cidade Alerta		Local Programming	Jornal da Record		CSI: NY	Dona Xepa		A Fazenda	
SBT	Mid-season	That's So Raven	Local Programming	SBT Brasil	Carrossel		Programa do Ratinho			Tela de Sucessos	
SBT	Follow-up	That's So Raven	Local Programming	SBT Brasil	Chiquititas	Carrossel	Programa do Ratinho			Tela de Sucessos	
SBT	Fall	That's So Raven	Local Programming	SBT Brasil	Chiquititas		Rebelde	Programa do Ratinho		Tela de Sucessos	
Band	Fall	Local Programming	Jornal da Band		Show da Fé	Zoo	The Simpsons		Pânico na Band repeat		

=== Saturday ===
Network		7:00 PM	7:30 PM	8:00 PM	8:30 PM	9:00 PM	9:30 PM	10:00 PM	10:30 PM	11:00 PM	11:30 PM
Globo	Mid-season	Praça TV	Guerra dos Sexos		Jornal Nacional	Salve Jorge		Zorra Total		Supercine	
Globo	Fall	Praça TV	Sangue Bom		Jornal Nacional	Amor à Vida		Zorra Total		Altas Horas	
Record	Mid-season	O Melhor do Brasil	Jornal da Record		O Melhor do Brasil					Legendários	
Record	Fall	Ídolos Kids		Jornal da Record		CSI: NY		A Fazenda		Legendários	
SBT	Mid-season	Aventura Selvagem	SBT Brasil		Esquadrão da Moda		Supernanny	Cine Família			
SBT	Fall	Aventura Selvagem	SBT Brasil		Esquadrão da Moda		Supernanny	Festival Sertanejo			
Band	Fall	Local Programming	Jornal da Band		Show da Fé		Encore	Top Cine			

== By network ==
=== Band ===
Returning series:

- CQC
- Pânico na Band
- A Liga
- Mulheres Ricas
- Polícia 24h
- Quem Fica em Pé?

New series:

- Quem Quer Casar com Meu Filho?
- Quem Quer Ser Milionário?

Not returning from 2012-13:

=== Globo ===
Returning series:

- A Grande Família
- The Voice Brasil
- Tapas & Beijos
- Louco por Elas
- Profissão Repórter
- Pé na Cova
- Amor & Sexo
- Big Brother Brasil

Telenovelas

- Lado a Lado
- Guerra dos Sexos
- Salve Jorge

New series:

- O Dentista Mascarado
- A Teia
- Doce de Mãe
- A Mulher do Prefeito
- O Caçador
- A Segunda Dama
- Amores Roubados
- Os Experientes
- Assombrações

Telenovelas

- Flor do Caribe
- Sangue Bom
- Amor à Vida
- Saramandaia
- Joia Rara
- Além do Horizonte
- Em Família

Not returning from 2012-13:

- Casseta & Planeta

=== Record ===
Returning series:

- A Fazenda
- Legendários
- O Aprendiz

Telenovelas

- Balacobaco

New series:

- José do Egito
- Got Talent Brasil
- A Bíblia

Telenovelas

- Dona Xepa
- Pecado Mortal

Not returning from 2012-13:

- Ídolos
- Fazenda de Verão

=== SBT ===
Returning series:

- Amigos da Onça'
- Astros
- A Praça é Nossa
- Esquadrão da Moda
- Supernanny

Telenovelas

- Carrossel

New series:

Telenovelas

- Chiquititas

Not returning from 2012-13:

- Cante se Puder
