= 2012–13 Brazilian network television schedule =

Television schedule for 2012

2012 in Brazilian television | 2013 in Brazilian television
2011–12 | 2012–13 | 2013–14 | 2014–15 | 2015–16 | 2016–17 | 2017–18

The 2012–13 network television schedule for the four major Brazilian Portuguese commercial broadcast networks in Brazil covers primetime hours from March 2012 to February 2013.

The schedule is followed by a list per network of returning series, new series or telenovelas (soap operas), and series canceled after the 2011–12 season.

== Legend ==
- Gray indicates Encore Programming.
- Light green indicates live sporting events.
- Orange indicates movies.
- Light yellow indicates the current schedule.

== Schedule ==
- New series are highlighted in **bold**.
- All times are in Brasília time. Add one hour for Atlantic islands time, subtract one hour for Amazon time and two hours for Acre time.
- Note: From July 27 to August 12, 2014, all Rede Record primetime programming was pre-empted for coverage of 2012 Summer Olympics.

Lime indicates the #1 most watched program of the season.
Yellow indicates the top-10 most watched programs of the season.
Cyan indicates the top-20 most watched programs of the season.
Magenta indicates the top-30 most watched programs of the season.
Orange indicates the top-40 most watched programs of the season.
Silver indicates the top-50 most watched programs of the season.

=== Sunday ===
Network		8:00 PM	8:30 PM	9:00 PM	9:30 PM	10:00 PM	10:30 PM	11:00 PM	11:30 PM
Globo	Fall	Domingão do Faustão		Fantástico				**The Ultimate Fighter**	
Globo	Follow-up	Dança dos Famosos		Fantástico				Domingo Maior	
Globo	Winter	Dança dos Famosos		Fantástico				Domingo Maior	
Globo	Spring	Domingão do Faustão		Fantástico				Domingo Maior	
Globo	Summer	Domingão do Faustão		Fantástico				Big Brother Brasil	
Record	Fall	Programa do Gugu		Domingo Espetacular				Repórter Record	
Record	Winter	A Fazenda		Domingo Espetacular				Repórter Record	
Record	Spring	Programa do Gugu		Domingo Espetacular				Repórter Record	
Record	Summer	Programa do Gugu		Domingo Espetacular				Repórter Record	
SBT		Programa Silvio Santos							
Band		Pânico na Band							

=== Monday ===
Network		8:30 PM	9:00 PM	9:30 PM	10:00 PM	10:30 PM	11:00 PM	11:30 PM	00:00 PM
Globo	Fall	Jornal Nacional		**Avenida Brasil**		Tela Quente			
Globo	Winter	Jornal Nacional		**Avenida Brasil**		Tela Quente			
Globo	Spring	Jornal Nacional		**Avenida Brasil**		Tela Quente			
Globo	Follow-up	Jornal Nacional		**Salve Jorge**		Tela Quente			
Globo	Summer	Jornal Nacional		**Salve Jorge**		Tela Quente			
Record	Fall	Jornal da Record		Vidas Opostas		**Máscaras**		**Show de Humor**	
Record	Winter	Rebelde		Tudo a Ver		A Fazenda		**Máscaras**	
Record	Spring	Jornal da Record		Rebelde		**Balacobaco**		**Câmera em Ação**	
Record	Summer	Jornal da Record		Rei Davi		**Balacobaco**		**Fazenda de Verão**	
SBT		**Carrossel**		Programa do Ratinho		Astros		SBT Repórter	
Band	Fall	Show da Fé		**Quem Fica em Pé?**		CQC			
Band	Summer	Show da Fé		**Os Simpsons**		Mulheres Ricas		O Mundo Segundo os Brasileiros	

=== Tuesday ===
Network		8:30 PM	9:00 PM	9:30 PM	10:00 PM	10:30 PM	11:00 PM	11:30 PM	00:00 PM
Globo	Fall	Jornal Nacional		**Avenida Brasil**		Tapas & Beijos		**Louco por Elas**	Profissão Repórter
Globo	Winter	Jornal Nacional		**Avenida Brasil**		Tapas & Beijos		**Gabriela**	Profissão Repórter
Globo	Spring	Jornal Nacional		**Avenida Brasil**		Tapas & Beijos		**Gabriela**	Profissão Repórter
Globo	Follow-up	Jornal Nacional		**Salve Jorge**		Tapas & Beijos		Louco por Elas	Profissão Repórter
Globo	Summer	Jornal Nacional		**Salve Jorge**		Big Brother Brasil		**O Canto da Sereia**	
Record	Fall	Jornal da Record		Vidas Opostas		**Máscaras**		**Fora de Controle**	
Record	Winter	Rebelde		Tudo a Ver		A Fazenda		**Máscaras**	
Record	Spring	Jornal da Record		Rebelde		**Balacobaco**		Ídolos	
Record	Summer	Jornal da Record		Rei Davi		**Balacobaco**		**Fazenda de Verão**	
SBT		**Carrossel**		Programa do Ratinho		Cine Espetacular			
Band	Fall	Show da Fé		**Quem Fica em Pé?**		A Liga			Agora É Tarde
Band	Summer	Show da Fé		**Os Simpsons**		**The Walking Dead**			Agora É Tarde

=== Wednesday ===
Network		8:30 PM	9:00 PM	9:30 PM	10:00 PM	10:30 PM	11:00 PM	11:30 PM	00:00 PM
Globo	Fall	Jornal Nacional		**Avenida Brasil**	Wednesday Football Night				Jornal da Globo
Globo	Winter	Jornal Nacional		**Avenida Brasil**	Wednesday Football Night				Jornal da Globo
Globo	Spring	Jornal Nacional		**Avenida Brasil**	Wednesday Football Night				Jornal da Globo
Globo	Follow-up	Jornal Nacional		**Salve Jorge**	Wednesday Football Night				Jornal da Globo
Globo	Summer	Jornal Nacional		**Salve Jorge**	Wednesday Football Night				Jornal da Globo
Record	Fall	Jornal da Record		Vidas Opostas		**Máscaras**		**Fora de Controle**	
Record	Winter	Rebelde		Tudo a Ver		A Fazenda		**Máscaras**	
Record	Spring	Jornal da Record		**Ídolos Kids**		**Balacobaco**		Ídolos	
Record	Summer	Jornal da Record		Rei Davi		**Balacobaco**		**Fazenda de Verão**	
SBT	Fall	**Carrossel**		Programa do Ratinho		**Cante Se Puder**		Aventura Selvagem	
SBT	Winter	**Carrossel**		Programa do Ratinho		**Cante Se Puder**		**O Maior Brasileiro**	
SBT	Spring	**Carrossel**		Programa do Ratinho		**Cante Se Puder**		De Frente com Gabi	
SBT	Summer	**Carrossel**		Programa do Ratinho		**Cante Se Puder**		De Frente com Gabi	
Band		Show da Fé		Pre-Game	Wednesday Football Night				Agora É Tarde

=== Thursday ===
Network		8:30 PM	9:00 PM	9:30 PM	10:00 PM	10:30 PM	11:00 PM	11:30 PM	00:00 PM
Globo	Fall	Jornal Nacional		**Avenida Brasil**		A Grande Família		**As Brasileiras**	Globo Mar
Globo	Winter	Jornal Nacional		**Avenida Brasil**		A Grande Família		**Gabriela**	Na Moral
Globo	Spring	Jornal Nacional		**Avenida Brasil**		A Grande Família		**Gabriela**	Amor & Sexo
Globo	Follow-up	Jornal Nacional		**Salve Jorge**		A Grande Família		**Fim do Mundo**	**Suburbia**
Globo	Summer	Jornal Nacional		**Salve Jorge**		Big Brother Brasil		**O Canto da Sereia**	
Record	Fall	Jornal da Record		Vidas Opostas		**Máscaras**		**Fora de Controle**	
Record	Winter	Rebelde		Tudo a Ver		A Fazenda		**Máscaras**	
Record	Spring	Jornal da Record		Rebelde		**Balacobaco**		Ídolos	
Record	Summer	Jornal da Record		Rei Davi		**Balacobaco**		**Fazenda de Verão**	
SBT		**Carrossel**		Programa do Ratinho		A Praça é Nossa		Conexão Repórter	
Band	Fall	Show da Fé		**Quem Fica em Pé?**		Polícia 24h			Agora É Tarde
Band	Summer	Show da Fé		**Os Simpsons**		Polícia 24h			Agora É Tarde

=== Friday ===
Network		8:30 PM	9:00 PM	9:30 PM	10:00 PM	10:30 PM	11:00 PM	11:30 PM	00:00 PM
Globo	Fall	Jornal Nacional		**Avenida Brasil**		Globo Repórter		**Casseta & Planeta**	
Globo	Winter	Jornal Nacional		**Avenida Brasil**		Globo Repórter		**Gabriela**	
Globo	Spring	Jornal Nacional		**Avenida Brasil**		Globo Repórter		**Gabriela**	
Globo	Follow-up	Jornal Nacional		**Salve Jorge**		Globo Repórter		Casseta & Planeta	
Globo	Summer	Jornal Nacional		**Salve Jorge**		Big Brother Brasil		Globo Repórter	
Record	Fall	Jornal da Record		Vidas Opostas		**Máscaras**		Câmera Record	
Record	Winter	Rebelde		Tudo a Ver		A Fazenda		**Máscaras**	
Record	Spring	Jornal da Record		Rebelde		**Balacobaco**		Câmera Record	
Record	Summer	Jornal da Record		Rei Davi		**Balacobaco**		**Fazenda de Verão**	
SBT		**Carrossel**		Programa do Ratinho		Tela de Sucessos			
Band	Fall	Show da Fé		Pânico na Band		**Perdidos na Tribo**			Agora É Tarde
Band	Winter	Show da Fé		**Quem Fica em Pé?**		Pânico na Band			Agora É Tarde
Band	Spring	Show da Fé		**Lol:-)**		Pânico na Band			Agora É Tarde
Band	Summer	Show da Fé		**Os Simpsons**		Pânico na Band			Agora É Tarde

=== Saturday ===
Network		8:30 PM	9:00 PM	9:30 PM	10:00 PM	10:30 PM	11:00 PM	11:30 PM	00:00 PM
Globo	Fall	Jornal Nacional		**Avenida Brasil**		Zorra Total		Supercine	
Globo	Winter	Jornal Nacional		**Avenida Brasil**		Zorra Total		Supercine	
Globo	Spring	Jornal Nacional		**Avenida Brasil**		Zorra Total		Supercine	
Globo	Follow-up	Jornal Nacional		**Salve Jorge**		Zorra Total		Supercine	
Globo	Summer	Jornal Nacional		**Salve Jorge**		Big Brother Brasil		Zorra Total	
Record	Fall	O Melhor do Brasil				O Melhor do Brasil		Legendários	
Record	Winter	O Melhor do Brasil				A Fazenda		Legendários	
Record	Spring	O Melhor do Brasil				O Melhor do Brasil		Legendários	
Record	Summer	O Melhor do Brasil				**Fazenda de Verão**		O Capa	
SBT		Esquadrão		Cine Família			Cine Belas Artes		
Band	Fall	Show da Fé		Acredite Se Quiser		CQC		Prison Break	
Band	Summer	Show da Fé		Acredite Se Quiser		Top Cine			
