= Grace Editorial =

Brazilian gospel publisher

The Grace Editorial (Portuguese: Graça Editorial) is a Brazilian gospel publisher, based in Rio de Janeiro, responsible for publications, books, and disclosures of the products of the International Church of God's Grace. It was purchased in 1984 by the Missionary R. R. Soares. The company has the copyright of Kenneth Hagin books in Brazil.

== Products ==
Grace Editorial produces books by Brazilian and international authors, CDs, DVDs, children books, newspapers, magazines, shirts, bibles, study bibles, dictionaries, atlas and encyclopedias, all in Brazil. In other countries, such as the United States, the company only translates the books of the Missionary R. R. Soares. The publisher publishes books, in Portuguese, English, Spanish, Arabic, French and other languages. One of the most sold books in the country is Healing the sick and casting out devils, of T. L. Osborn, and How to take possession of the blessing, the pioneer of R. R. Soares.

== Some published authors by Grace Editorial ==
R. R. Soares

T. L. Osborn

Daisy W. Osborn

LaDonna Osborn

Gordon Lindsay

Kenneth E. Hagin

Kenneth W. Hagin

Jerry R. O'Dell

Derek Prince

Joyce Meyer

Abraão de Almeida

Carroll Thompson

== See also ==
- R. R. Soares
- International Church of God's Grace
- RIT
- Faith Show
