= 2014–15 Brazilian network television schedule =

2014 in Brazilian television | 2015 in Brazilian television
2011–12 | 2012–13 | 2013–14 | 2014–15 | 2015–16 | 2016–17 | 2017–18

The 2014–15 network television schedule for the four major Brazilian Portuguese commercial broadcast networks in Brazil covers primetime hours from April 2014 to March 2015.

The schedule is followed by a list per network of returning series, new series or telenovelas (soap operas), and series canceled after the 2013–14 season.

== Legend ==
- Gray indicates Encore Programming.
- Light green indicates live sporting events.
- Light yellow indicates the current schedule.

== Schedule ==
- New series are highlighted in **bold**.
- All times are in Brasília time. Add one hour for Atlantic islands time, subtract one hour for Amazon time and two hours for Acre time.
- Note: From June 12 to July 13, 2014 all Rede Globo primetime programming was pre-empted for coverage of 2014 FIFA World Cup.

Lime indicates the #1 most watched program of the season.
Yellow indicates the top-10 most watched programs of the season

=== Sunday ===
Network		8:00 PM	8:30 PM	9:00 PM	9:30 PM	10:00 PM	10:30 PM	11:00 PM	11:30 PM
Globo	Fall	Domingão do Faustão (Dança dos Famosos) (Os Iluminados Domingão)		Fantástico				**SuperStar**	
Globo	Winter	Domingão do Faustão (Dança dos Famosos) (Os Iluminados Domingão)		Fantástico				**24: Live Another Day**	
Globo	Spring	Domingão do Faustão (Dança dos Famosos) (Os Iluminados Domingão)		Fantástico				Domingo Maior	
Globo	**Summer**	Domingão do Faustão (Dança dos Famosos) (Os Iluminados Domingão)		Fantástico				Big Brother Brasil	
Record	Fall	Domingo Espetacular						Spartacus	
Record	Winter	Domingo Espetacular						Tela Máxima	
Record	Spring	Domingo Espetacular						A Fazenda	
Record	**Summer**	Domingo Espetacular						**Repórter em Ação**	
**SBT**		Programa Silvio Santos							
**Band**		Pânico na Band							

=== Monday ===
Network		8:30 PM	9:00 PM	9:30 PM	10:00 PM	10:30 PM	11:00 PM	11:30 PM	00:00 PM
Globo	Fall	Jornal Nacional #3 25.00		**Em Família** #2 29.63			Tela Quente		
Globo	Winter	Jornal Nacional #3 25.00		**Em Família** #2 29.63			Tela Quente		
Globo	**Spring**	Jornal Nacional #3 25.00		**Império** #1 32.67			Tela Quente		
Globo	**Summer**	Jornal Nacional #3 25.00		**Império** #1 32.67			Big Brother Brasil 15		Tela Quente
Record	Fall	Jornal da Record		**Vitória**			Repórter Record		Roberto Justus +
Record	Spring	Jornal da Record		**Vitória**			A Fazenda		Repórter Record
Record	**Summer**	Jornal da Record		**Vitória**			Repórter Record		
SBT	Fall	Chiquititas		Rebelde	Programa do Ratinho		Máquina da Fama		**The Noite**
SBT	Spring	Chiquititas		Rebelde	Programa do Ratinho		**Esse Artista Sou Eu**		**The Noite**
SBT	**Summer**	Chiquititas		Rebelde	Roda a Roda	Programa do Ratinho			**The Noite**
**Band**	2014	Show da Fé		HIMYM	Simpsons	CQC			
**Band**	**Summer**	Glee	Show da Fé		Simpsons	The Walking Dead			

=== Tuesday ===
Network		8:30 PM	9:00 PM	9:30 PM	10:00 PM	10:30 PM	11:00 PM	11:30 PM	00:00 PM
Globo	Fall	Jornal Nacional #3 25.00		**Em Família** #2 29.63		Tapas & Beijos		Pé na Cova	Profissão Repórter
Globo	Winter	Jornal Nacional #3 25.00		**Em Família** #2 29.63		Tapas & Beijos		**O Rebu**	Profissão Repórter
Globo	Spring	Jornal Nacional #3 25.00		**Império** #1 32.67		Tapas & Beijos		**Sexo e as Negas**	Profissão Repórter
Globo	**Summer**	Jornal Nacional #3 25.00		**Império** #1 32.67		Big Brother Brasil			
Record	Fall	Jornal da Record		**Vitória**		Aprendiz Celebridades		Grimm	
Record	Winter	Jornal da Record		**Vitória**		A Fazenda 7		**Plano Alto**	
Record	Spring	Jornal da Record		**Vitória**		Milagres de Jesus			Repórter Record Investigação
Record	**Summer**	Jornal da Record		**Vitória**		**Gugu**			
**SBT**		Chiquititas		Rebelde	Programa do Ratinho		Cine Espetacular		
Band	Fall	Show da Fé		HIMYM	O Mundo Segundo...		A Liga		
Band	Spring	Show da Fé		O Mundo Segundo...		**MasterChef**			
Band	**Summer**	Glee	Show da Fé		Simpsons	O Mundo Segundo os Brasileiros			

=== Wednesday ===
Network		8:30 PM	9:00 PM		9:30 PM	10:00 PM	10:30 PM	11:00 PM	11:30 PM	00:00 PM
Globo	Fall	Jornal Nacional #3 25.00		**Em Família** #2 29.63		2014 Wednesday Football Night 2015 Wednesday Football Night				
Globo	Winter	Jornal Nacional #3 25.00		**Em Família** #2 29.63		2014 Wednesday Football Night 2015 Wednesday Football Night				
Globo	Spring	Jornal Nacional #3 25.00		**Império** #1 32.67		2014 Wednesday Football Night 2015 Wednesday Football Night				
Globo	**Summer**	Jornal Nacional #3 25.00		**Império** #1 (8:57PM)	BBB (9:43PM)	2014 Wednesday Football Night 2015 Wednesday Football Night				
Record	Fall	Jornal da Record		**Vitória**			**Milagres de Jesus**		Câmera Record	
Record	Winter	Jornal da Record		**Vitória**			A Fazenda		**Plano Alto**	
Record	Spring	Jornal da Record		**Vitória**			**Milagres de Jesus**		Câmera Record	
Record	**Summer**	Jornal da Record		**Vitória**			**Gugu**			
**SBT**	2014	Chiquititas		Rebelde		Programa do Ratinho		Conexão Repórter		**The Noite**
**SBT**	**Summer**	Chiquititas		Rebelde		Roda a Roda	Programa do Ratinho			**The Noite**
**Band**		Show da Fé			Pre-Game	2014 Wednesday Football Night; 2015 Wednesday Football Night				

=== Thursday ===
Network		8:30 PM	9:00 PM	9:30 PM	10:00 PM	10:30 PM	11:00 PM	11:30 PM	00:00 PM
Globo	Fall	Jornal Nacional #3 25.00		**Em Família** #2 29.63		A Grande Família		**A Segunda Dama**	**Tá no Ar**
Globo	Winter	Jornal Nacional #3 25.00		**Em Família** #2 29.63		A Grande Família		**O Rebu**	Na Moral
Globo	Spring	Jornal Nacional #3 25.00		**Império** #1 32.67		The Voice Brasil			Amor & Sexo
Globo	**Summer**	Jornal Nacional #3 25.00		**Império** #1 32.67		Big Brother Brasil			Tá no Ar
Record	Fall	Jornal da Record		**Vitória**		Aprendiz Celebridades		Super Tela	
Record	Winter	Jornal da Record		**Vitória**		A Fazenda		**Plano Alto**	
Record	Spring	Jornal da Record		**Vitória**		Milagres de Jesus		CSI: Crime Scene Investigation	
Record	**Summer**	Jornal da Record		**Vitória**		**Gugu**			
**SBT**		Chiquititas		Rebelde	Programa do Ratinho		A Praça é Nossa		**The Noite**
**Band**	2014	Show da Fé		HIMYM	Simpsons		Polícia 24h		Agora é Tarde
**Band**	**Summer**	Show da Fé		Glee	Simpsons		Sessão Especial		

=== Friday ===
Network		8:30 PM	9:00 PM	9:30 PM	10:00 PM	10:30 PM	11:00 PM	11:30 PM	00:00 PM
Globo	Fall	Jornal Nacional #3 25.00		**Em Família** #2 29.63		Globo Repórter		**O Caçador**	
Globo	Winter	Jornal Nacional #3 25.00		**Em Família** #2 29.63		Globo Repórter		**O Rebu**	
Globo	Spring	Jornal Nacional #3 25.00		**Império** #1 32.67		Globo Repórter		**Dupla Identidade**	
Globo	**Summer**	Jornal Nacional #3 25.00		**Império** #1 32.67		Big Brother Brasil		Globo Repórter	
Record	Fall	Jornal da Record		**Vitória**		**Me Leva Contigo**		Bates Motel	
Record	Spring	Jornal da Record		**Vitória**		A Fazenda		**Plano Alto**	
Record	**Summer**	Jornal da Record		**Vitória**		Super Tela			
**SBT**		Chiquititas		Rebelde	Programa do Ratinho		Tela de Sucessos		
**Band**		Show da Fé		HIMYM; Glee	Simpsons	Pânico na Band			Agora é Tarde

=== Saturday ===
Network		8:30 PM	9:00 PM	9:30 PM	10:00 PM	10:30 PM	11:00 PM	11:30 PM	00:00 PM
Globo	Fall	Jornal Nacional #3 25.00		**Em Família** #2 29.63		Zorra Total		Altas Horas	
Globo	Winter	Jornal Nacional #3 25.00		**Em Família** #2 29.63		Zorra Total		Altas Horas	
Globo	Spring	Jornal Nacional #3 25.00		**Império** #1 32.67		Zorra Total		Altas Horas	
Globo	**Summer**	Jornal Nacional #3 25.00		**Império** #1 32.67		Big Brother Brasil		Zorra Total	
Record	Fall	**Programa da Sabrina**				**Programa da Sabrina**		Legendários	
Record	Winter	**Programa da Sabrina**				**Programa da Sabrina**		Legendários	
Record	Spring	**Programa da Sabrina**				A Fazenda		Legendários	
Record	**Summer**	**Programa da Sabrina**				**Programa da Sabrina**		Legendários	
SBT	Fall	**Patrulha Salvadora**		Esquadrão da Moda		**Arena SBT**			
SBT	Winter	**Patrulha Salvadora**		Esquadrão da Moda		Cine Família			
SBT	Spring	**Patrulha Salvadora**		Esquadrão da Moda		Festival Sertanejo			
SBT	**Summer**	**Patrulha Salvadora**		Esquadrão da Moda		Cine Família			
**Band**		Show da Fé		CQC		Top Cine			

== By network ==
=== Band ===
Returning series:

- Pânico na Band
- CQC
- O Mundo Segundo os Brasileiros
- A Liga
- Agora é Tarde
- Wednesday Football Night
- Polícia 24h

New series:

- MasterChef

Not returning from 2013–14:

- Quem Fica em Pé?
- Quem Quer Casar Com Meu Filho?

=== Globo ===
Returning series:

- Domingão do Faustão
- Dança dos Famosos
- Fantástico
- Tela Quente
- Tapas & Beijos
- Pé na Cova
- Profissão Repórter
- Wednesday Football Night
- A Grande Família
- Na Moral
- The Voice Brasil
- Amor & Sexo
- Big Brother Brasil

New series:

- SuperStar
- A Segunda Dama
- Tá no Ar
- O Caçador
- Sexo e as Negas
- Dupla Identidade
- Felizes para Sempre?
- Planeta Extremo

New telenovelas:

- Em Família
- Meu Pedacinho de Chão
- Geração Brasil
- O Rebu
- Império

Not returning from 2013–14:

- O Dentista Mascarado
- A Mulher do Prefeito
- Louco por Elas
- Amores Roubados
- A Teia
- Doce de Mãe

=== Record ===
Returning series:

- Domingo Espetacular
- Repórter Record
- Roberto Justus +
- Aprendiz Celebridades
- Câmera Record
- A Fazenda
- Legendários

New series:

- Milagres de Jesus
- Me Leva Contigo
- Plano Alto
- Programa da Sabrina

New telenovelas:

- Vitória

Not returning from 2013–14:

- Got Talent Brasil
- José do Egito
- O Melhor do Brasil

=== SBT ===
Returning series:

- Programa Silvio Santos
- Programa do Ratinho
- Máquina da Fama
- Conexão Repórter
- A Praça é Nossa
- Esquadrão da Moda
- Festival Sertanejo

Returning telenovelas:

- Chiquititas
- Rebelde

New series:

- Esse Artista Sou Eu
- The Noite
- Cozinha Sob Pressão
- Patrulha Salvadora
- Arena SBT

Not returning from 2013–14:

- Astros
- SBT Repórter
- Cante Se Puder
- Amigos da Onça
- Famoso Quem?

== Renewals and cancellations ==
=== Renewals ===
==== Globo ====
- Pé na Cova—Renewed for a fourth season on June 14, 2014.
- SuperStar—Renewed for a second season on June 5, 2014.
- Tá no Ar—Renewed for a second season on June 5, 2014.
- Tapas & Beijos—Renewed for a fifth and final season on August 21, 2014.

==== Record ====
- Aprendiz Celebridades—Renewed for eleventh season on July 3, 2014.
- Milagres de Jesus—Renewed for a second season on March 18, 2014.

=== Cancellations/Series endings ===
==== Globo ====
- A Grande Família—It was announced on March 17, 2014 that season fourteen would be the final season. The series concluded on September 11, 2014.

==== Record ====
- Me Leva Contigo—Canceled on July 22, 2014.

==== SBT ====
- Arena SBT—Canceled on July 22, 2014.
