= SBT MS =

SBT MS (ZYP 310)
Campo Grande, Mato Grosso do Sul; Brazil
- Channels: Digital: 28 (UHF); Virtual: 8

Programming
- Affiliations: SBT

Ownership
- Owner: Fundação Internacional de Comunicação (R. R. Soares); (Rede Centro Oeste de Rádio e Televisão Ltda.)

History
- Founded: 1976
- First air date: October 11, 1980
- Former call signs: ZYA 944 (1980-2018)
- Former names: TV Campo Grande (1980-2011)
- Former channel numbers: Analog: 8 (VHF, 1980–2017)
- Former affiliations: TVS-Record (1980-1981)

Technical information
- Licensing authority: ANATEL
- ERP: 5 kW
- Transmitter coordinates: 20°28′47.2″S 54°36′59.2″W

Links
- Public license information: Profile
- Website: sbtms.com.br

SBT MS (channel 8) is a Brazilian television station based in Campo Grande, capital of the state of Mato Grosso do Sul. It is owned by Fundação Internacional de Comunicações, owned by the International Grace of God Church, of missionary R. R. Soares, who also owns TV Guanandi. The station is an SBT affiliate.

== History ==
The station was founded on October 11, 1980 as TV Campo Grande, by the owner of the newspaper Correio do Estado, José Barbosa Rodrigues, who obtained the license in 1976. The station became the first to be created after Mato Grosso do Sul was separated from Mato Grosso. Initially it operated with entirely local programming, but in 1981, it became affiliated with the newly created SBT, being one of the network's long-standing affiliates.

In 2000, it began expanding its signal to other municipalities in Mato Grosso do Sul, transmitting via satellite to retransmitters that currently reach 74 municipalities and around 97.5% of the population. In 2003, with the death of José Barbosa Rodrigues, the station began to be managed by his son, Antônio João Hugo Rodrigues.

On March 11, 2019, Rede Centro-Oeste de Rádio e Televisão rented the station to Fundação Internacional de Comunicação, media arm of the International Grace of God Church. In September 2011, TV Campo Grande was acquired by Fundação Internacional de Comunicação. Following the acquisition, the station went through changes to its schedule. The name of the station was changed to the current SBT MS. The changes were made under the guidance of R. R. Soares, the new owner of the station.

== Technical information ==
Virtual channel	Digital channel	Screen	Content
8.1	28 UHF	1080i	SBT MS/SBT

The station shut down its analog signal on October 31, 2018, following ANATEL's official roadmap.
