= WPUT =

WPUT may refer to:

- WPUT (FM), a radio station (90.1 FM) licensed to serve North Salem, New York, United States
- WPUT (AM), a defunct radio station (1510 AM) formerly licensed to serve Brewster, New York
