= WINE (AM) =

- Brookfield, Connecticut; United States
- Broadcast area: Greater Danbury
- Frequency: 940 kHz
- Branding: Nossa Radio

Programming
- Language: Brazilian Portuguese
- Format: Religious

Ownership
- Owner: International Church of the Grace of God; (International Church of the Grace of God, Inc.)

History
- First air date: December 2, 1964

Technical information
- Licensing authority: FCC
- Facility ID: 15389
- Class: D
- Power: 680 watts day; 4 watts night
- Transmitter coordinates: 41°29′35.34″N 73°25′43.44″W

Links
- Public license information: Public file; LMS
- Webcast: Listen live
- Website: nossaradiousa.com

WINE (940 kHz), is a commercial radio station airing Brazilian Portuguese religious programming, licensed to serve Brookfield, Connecticut. The station is owned by the International Church of the Grace of God as part of its "Nossa Radio" network.

By day, WINE transmits with 680 watts. Because 940 AM is a Canadian and Mexican clear-channel frequency, WINE reduces power at night to only four watts to avoid interference. The station's transmitter is located on Carmen Hill Road in Brookfield.

== History ==
On December 12, 1964, WINE signed on the air. Originally it was a daytimer, required to go off the air at sunset. It was simulcast with co-owned FM station 95.1 WGHF, which had gone on the air in 1957. Later, the FM station began using the same call sign as the AM station, WINE-FM. In the 1970s and early 1980s, WINE-AM-FM were Top 40 stations. When the AM had to go off the air, WINE-FM continued playing the Top 40 hits at night. By the 1980s, WINE became a full-service, adult contemporary station, while the FM station became album rock outlet WRKI.

In the 1990s, WINE became part of an all-news network that included WNLK (1350 AM) in Norwalk, Connecticut. Both became news/talk a few years later. After being sold to Cumulus Media, WINE spent a few years as an adult standards station, along with now-defunct sister station WPUT (1510 AM) in Brewster, New York.

Both WINE and WPUT switched to an all sports format. At first, it was part of ESPN Radio. They switched to CBS Sports Radio on January 2, 2013. WINE's nighttime signal is very weak at 4 watts. WPUT operated daytime only.

WINE's longtime competitor is WLAD in Danbury, now a talk radio station. In addition to WRKI, WINE had a second FM sister station, Patterson, New York's WDBY, which has a booster station in Danbury.

On August 30, 2013, a deal was announced in which Townsquare Media would acquire 53 Cumulus stations, including WINE, for $238 million. The deal was part of Cumulus' acquisition of Dial Global; Townsquare and Dial Global were both controlled by Oaktree Capital Management. The sale to Townsquare was completed on November 14, 2013.

The station lost its CBS Sports Radio affiliation in June 2021, and for several weeks, went dark, before returning with a simulcast of WRKI to retain the license.

In January 2023, WINE went silent. That July, Townsquare agreed to sell the station to the International Church of the Grace of God for $150,000; WINE immediately joined its Nossa Rádio network, also heard on WBIX in Boston and WFLL in Fort Lauderdale, Florida, under a local marketing agreement. The sale was consummated on December 12, 2023.
