= Marcos Soares =

Marcos Soares may refer to:

- Marcos Soares (sailor) (born 1961), Brazilian sailor
- Marcos Soares (footballer) (born 1975), Brazilian football manager and former footballer
- Marcos Soares (politician) (born 1978), Brazilian politician

== See also ==
- Marco Soares (disambiguation)
