= Nossa Rádio =

Brazilian radio network

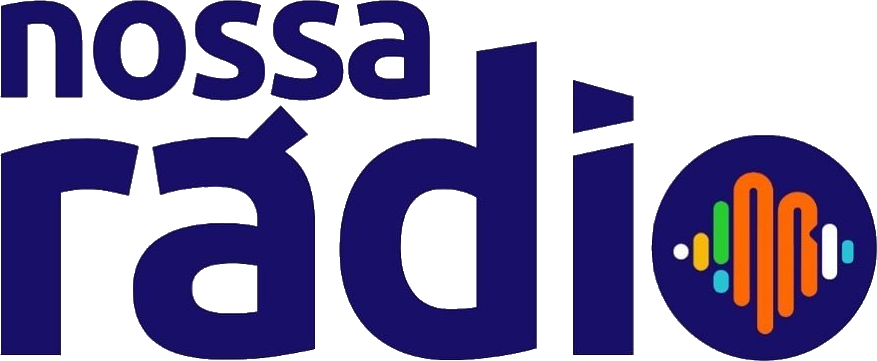
- Type: Broadcast radio network
- Country: Brazil
- Headquarters: São Paulo, São Paulo

Programming
- Language(s): Portuguese
- Format: Evangelism; Christian music

Ownership
- Parent: Fundação Internacional de Comunicação of International Grace of God Church
- Sister stations: RIT

History
- Launch date: 2002

Links
- Website: nossaradio.com.br

Nossa Rádio is a Brazilian Christian radio network belonging to the Fundação Internacional de Comunicação, a media group of the International Grace of God Church, led by the missionary R. R. Soares.

Its programming is dedicated to songs by artists from the Graça Music label, broadcasts of services and preaching by the missionary R. R. Soares, and Pastor Jayme de Amorim Campos presents the program Na Mesa com o Senhor, which is broadcast live simultaneously by the stations of the Nossa Rádio network. The network also has a news program and public participation.

== History ==
In 2002, missionary R. R. Soares already had a presence on the radio through Rádio Relógio in Rio de Janeiro and Rádio Gospel in São Paulo, the latter facing litigation regarding its transmission location. In addition to radios, there was an expansion process of its television network, the RIT. In the second half of the same year, the missionary reached an agreement with businessman Orestes Quércia and leased two FM stations owned by him in Rio de Janeiro and São Paulo. The new project was called "Nossa Rádio."

In Rio de Janeiro, Nossa Rádio went on air on October 1, 2002, replacing the NovaBrasil FM branch. In São Paulo, the station debuted on December 1, 2002, replacing Manchete Gospel FM, which had migrated to its own frequency and was renamed Gospel FM.

Since 2018, Nossa Rádio has had a presence in the United States with the formation of Nossa Rádio USA, with programming similar to that of the Brazilian radio network and content aimed at Portuguese-speaking residents.

== Stations ==
=== Current ===
==== Southeast ====
- Nossa Rádio (São Paulo, SP) 106.9 FM and 700 AM: This is the headquarters station of Rede Nossa Rádio.
- Nossa Rádio (Belo Horizonte, Minas Gerais) 97.3 FM. Radio granted in the municipality of Pedro Leopoldo (MG). Formerly called Rádio Altaneira. Corporate name: Rádio Grande BH LTDA.
- Nossa Rádio (Vitória), ES) 96.5 FM.
- Rádio Relógio (Rio de Janeiro, RJ) 580 AM: Retransmitted at certain times the programming of Nossa Rádio FM 89.3, which was also located in Rio de Janeiro.

==== Northeast ====
- Nossa Rádio (Salvador, Bahia) 103.3 FM. has its transmission antenna located in Vera Cruz (i.e., the location that is granted). The station's address is on Rua Carlos Gomes, in Downtown Salvador, coinciding with the address of a Grace Church. The station's prefix is ZYC 370. In the morning, it broadcasts the program Good Morning Nossa Rádio. License information: CDB, PDF
- Nossa Rádio (Fortaleza, Ceará) 97.7 FM corporate name Rádio Costa do Sol, became Nossa Rádio on March 1, 2010
- Nossa Rádio (Pernambuco, Recife) 106.9 FM.
- Nossa Rádio (Teresina, Piauí)

==== Midwest ====
- Nossa Rádio (Goiânia, Goiás) 94.3 FM. Granted in Bonfinópolis.
- And many other stations spread across Brazil.

=== Former ===
- Nossa Rádio (Rio de Janeiro, RJ) 89.3 FM (From October 2002 until May 3, 2010) At certain times, the programming on Rádio Relógio was retransmitted. It was the first station to be named Nossa Rádio. It is currently Novabrasil FM Rio de Janeiro.
