= WRLZ =

WRLZ may refer to:

- WRLZ (AM), a radio station (1160 AM) licensed to serve St. Cloud, Florida, United States
- WIWA (AM), a radio station (1270 AM) licensed to serve Eatonville, Florida, which held the call sign WRLZ from 1996 to 2019
