= David Soares (Brazilian politician) =

Brazilian politician (born 1973)

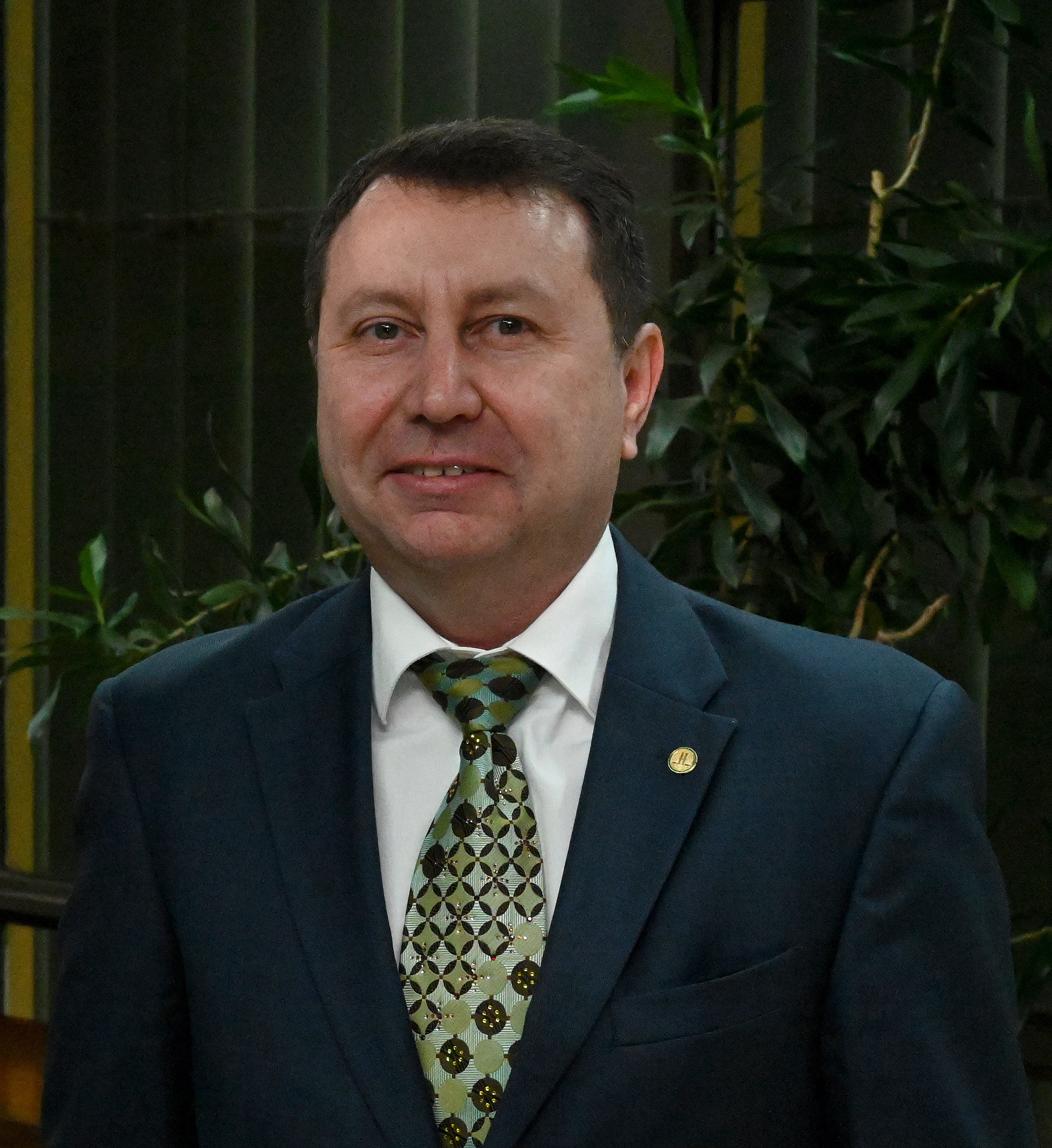
- Soares in 2023

Member of the Chamber of Deputies
- Incumbent
- Assumed office 1 February 2019
- Constituency: São Paulo

Personal details
- Born: 21 December 1973 (age 52)
- Party: Brazil Union (since 2022)
- Parent: R. R. Soares (father)
- Relatives: André Soares (brother); Daniel Soares (brother); Marcos Soares (brother); Filipe Soares (brother)

David Bezerra Ribeiro Soares (born 21 December 1973) is a Brazilian politician serving as a member of the Chamber of Deputies since 2019. He is the son of R. R. Soares and the brother of André Soares, Daniel Soares, Marcos Soares and Filipe Soares.
