= Hell's Kitchen: Cozinha sob Pressão =

- Also known as: Cozinha Sob Pressão
- Genre: Cookery
- Created by: Gordon Ramsay
- Presented by: Carlos Bertolazzi
- Country of origin: Brazil
- No. of seasons: 4

Production
- Running time: 60 minutes
- Production companies: ITV Studios Global Entertainment; Formata Produções

Original release
- Network: SBT
- Release: October 11, 2014 – December 17, 2016

Cozinha Sob Pressão (Kitchen Under Pressure) is a Brazilian competitive cooking reality show airing on SBT during the 2014–15 Brazilian television season. It is based on the British series Hell's Kitchen.

Chefs compete against each other in cooking challenges designated by celebrity chef Carlos Bertolazzi in order to win the R$100,000 cash prize.

The series premiered on October 11, 2014.

== 1st season ==
=== Contestants ===
Biographical information according to SBT's official website.
(ages stated at the start of the contest)

Contestant	Age	Occupation	Hometown	Status	Finish
Manoela Leão	25	Chef	São Bernardo	Eliminated 1st	14th
Francisco Oliveira	28	Chef	Jaú	Eliminated 2nd	13th
Fabricio Guerreiro	31	Food truck owner	Praia Grande	Quit	12th
Lilian Carvalho	54	Buffet Caterer	São Paulo	Eliminated 3rd	11th
Ronaldo Schüller	39	Chef consultant	Curitiba	Eliminated 4th	10th
Diego Gimenez	26	Sub Chef	São Paulo	Eliminated 5th	9th
Marcel Bernardi	29	Personal chef	São Paulo	Eliminated 6th	8th
Samara Martins	32	Chef	São Paulo	Eliminated 7th	7th
Derileusa Rosa	42	Professor of Gastronomy	São Paulo	Eliminated 8th	6th
Marcelo Oliveira	39	Chef	Arujá	Eliminated 9th	5th
Daniele Rocco	28	Chef	São Bernardo	Eliminated 10th	4th
Caroline Chloé	25	Confectioner	Rio de Janeiro	Eliminated 11th	3rd
Beatriz Buessio	27	Chef	São Paulo	Runner-up	2nd
Arthur Sauer	33	Chef	Santo André	Winner	1st

=== Contestant progress ===
No.	Chef	Original teams						Switched teams	Individual					Final
No.	Chef	101	102	103	104	105	106	107	108	109	110	111	112	113
1	Arthur	IN	LOSE	WIN	BoW	LOSE	LOSE	LOSE	NOM	IN	IN	IN	IN	WINNER
2	Beatriz	IN	LOSE	LOSE	BoB	LOSE	LOSE	WIN	IN	IN	IN	IN	IN	RUNNER-UP
3	Caroline	IN	LOSE	LOSE	WIN	LOSE	LOSE	BoB	IN	IN	IN	NOM	OUT	
4	Daniele	IN	LOSE	NOM	WIN	NOM	NOM	WIN	IN	IN	NOM	OUT		
5	Marcelo	IN	LOSE	WIN	NOM	LOSE	NOM	LOSE	IN	NOM	OUT			
6	Derileusa	IN	NOM	BoW	WIN	LOSE	NOM	LOSE	NOM	OUT				
7	Samara	NOM	LOSE	LOSE	WIN	NOM	LOSE	WIN	OUT					
8	Marcel	NOM	LOSE	WIN	NOM	LOSE	LOSE	OUT						
9	Diego	IN	LOSE	WIN	LOSE	NOM	OUT							
10	Ronaldo	IN	LOSE	WIN	LOSE	OUT								
11	Lilian	IN	NOM	OUT										
12	Fabricio	NOM	NOM	LEFT										
13	Francisco	IN	OUT											
14	Manoela	OUT												

Key

Eliminated (after Nomination)	Eliminated (without Nomination)	Withdrew (without Nomination)
Nominated	Winner	Runner-up

== Ratings ==
=== Brazilian ratings ===
All ratings are in points and are provided by IBOPE.

Episode	Air Date	Viewers (in points)	Rank Timeslot	Rating Source
1	October 11	5.2	3	
2	October 18	5.2	3	
3	October 25	5.5	3	
4	November 1	4.7	3	
5	November 15	4.8	3	
6	November 22	6.2	3	
7	November 29	5.1	3	
8	December 6			
9	December 13			
10	December 20			
11	December 27			
12	January 3			
13	January 10			
