= WRLZ (AM) =

- St. Cloud, Florida; United States
- Broadcast area: Orlando
- Frequency: 1160 kHz
- Branding: Nossa Rádio USA

Programming
- Format: Portuguese
- Affiliations: Nossa Rádio

Ownership
- Owner: International Church of the Grace of God, Inc.

History
- Former call signs: WOYE (2002–2006); WIWA (2006–2019)

Technical information
- Licensing authority: FCC
- Facility ID: 135914
- Class: B
- Power: 2,500 watts (day); 500 watts (night)
- Transmitter coordinates: 28°16′15.00″N 81°20′0.00″W

Links
- Public license information: Public file; LMS
- Webcast: Listen live
- Website: nossaradiousa.com

WRLZ (1160 AM) is a radio station broadcasting a Brazilian Portuguese format. Licensed to St. Cloud, Florida, United States, it serves the greater Orlando area. The station is currently owned by the International Church of the Grace of God.

WRLZ has been granted an FCC construction permit to increase day power to 14,000 watts.

Former WRLZ logo
