= WJZZ =

WJZZ may refer to:

- WJZZ (FM), a radio station (88.1 FM) licensed to serve Montgomery, New York, United States
- WPUT (FM), a radio station (90.1 FM) licensed to serve North Salem, New York, which held the call sign WJZZ from 2009 to 2014
- WDMK, a radio station (105.9 FM) licensed to serve Detroit, Michigan, which held the call sign WJZZ from 1974 to 1996
- WEZN-FM, a radio station (99.9 FM) licensed to serve Bridgeport, Connecticut, which held the call sign WJZZ from 1960 to 1973
