= Filipe Soares (politician) =

Brazilian politician (born 1981)

Member of the Legislative Assembly of Rio de Janeiro
- Incumbent
- Assumed office 1 January 2015

Personal details
- Born: 4 December 1981 (age 44)
- Party: Brazil Union
- Parent: R. R. Soares (father)
- Relatives: David Soares (brother); André Soares (brother); Daniel Soares (brother); Marcos Soares (brother)

Filipe Bezerra Ribeiro Soares (born 4 December 1981) is a Brazilian politician serving as a member of the Legislative Assembly of Rio de Janeiro since 2015. He is the son of R. R. Soares and the brother of David Soares, André Soares, Daniel Soares and Marcos Soares.
