= Nossa TV =

Brazilian television service

- Industry: Satellite television
- Founded: September 14, 2007
- Founder: R.R. Soares' International Church of God's Grace
- Headquarters: Brazil
- Key people: R.R. Soares
- Products: Satellite television service
- Services: Direct To Home (DTH) satellite television
- Owner: International Church of God's Grace
- Parent: International Church of God's Grace

Nossa TV (English: Our TV) is a Brazilian satellite television service of R.R. Soares' International Church of God's Grace. The service was officially launched on 14 September 2007 in the metropolitan regions of São Paulo and Rio de Janeiro, but now operates in 26 states and the Federal District.

The service uses the Direct To Home system. After a period of negotiations, BandSports was added on December 3, 2007. It was also the first satellite television operator to negotiate with Turner to carry Tooncast from its December 2008 launch.

In 2010, Nossa TV began to migrate to DVB-S2.
