= Reinaldo Azevedo =

Brazilian political journalist

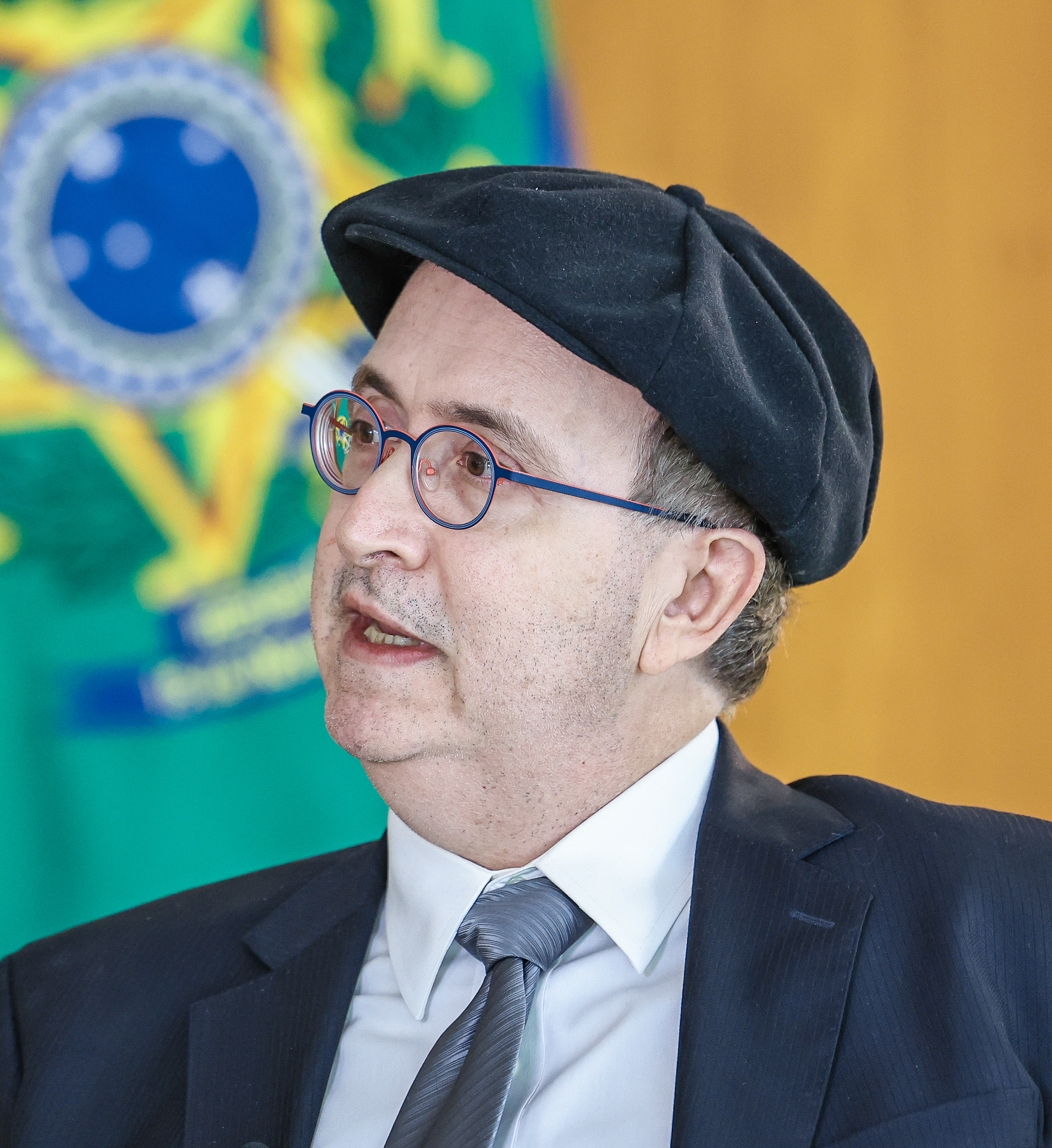
- Reinaldo Azevedo in 2023

Personal details
- Born: José Reinaldo Azevedo e Silva; August 19, 1961 (age 65) Dois Córregos, São Paulo, Brazil
- Spouse: Lilian Mahfud
- Children: 2
- Education: University of São Paulo (BLitt); Methodist University of São Paulo (BJ)
- Profession: Journalist, writer, radio host
- Website: Azevedo's column

José Reinaldo Azevedo e Silva (born August 19, 1961) is a Brazilian journalist. Currently, Reinaldo is a columnist in Folha de S.Paulo newspaper and acts as a commentator on RedeTV! News, of RedeTV! channel, in addition to presenting the program "Pela Ordem" on the platforms of the station. Azevedo's blog was listed in 2014 as one of the top ten political blogs in Brazil.

For 12 years his blog was hosted on the site of Veja, however, on May 23, 2017, he moved his blog to RedeTV! Portal. On the same date, he resigned from the Jovem Pan radio, where he anchored the evening program "Os Pingos nos Is"; and the next day, the journalist made his debut as an anchor in the program "Pela Ordem" on RedeTV! channel, from which he was later fired. That same week, he also signed a contract with Radio BandNews FM, whose new program "O É da Coisa" debuted at 6 pm on May 29, 2017.

== Political views ==
Reinaldo Azevedo has positioned himself as a centrist commentator, sometimes on the left of the political spectrum of Brazilian politics, with economically centrist stances. He is a critic of authoritarianism, and the lack of rule of law, since former right-wing Brazilian president, Jair Bolsonaro, started to attack Brazilian institutions such as the Supreme Court. Due to this, Reinaldo Azevedo, previously a harsh critic of the Workers Party (PT) and the current president, Luiz Inácio Lula da Silva, sided with Lula on the runoffs of the 2022 Brazilian election against Bolsonaro and the right-wing coalition.

The journalist criticizes the Operation Car Wash (Portuguese: Operação Lava Jato), because he believes that there are "excesses the prosecutors of the task force that disregard the laws and threaten the rule of law".

== Works ==
- Contra o Consenso – Ensaios e Críticas (2005)
- O País dos Petralhas (2008)
- Máximas de Um País Mínimo (2009)
- O País dos Petralhas II – O inimigo agora é o mesmo (2012)
- Objeções de um Rottweiller Amoroso (2014)
