= 2015–16 Brazilian network television schedule =

2015 in Brazilian television | 2016 in Brazilian television
2011–12 | 2012–13 | 2013–14 | 2014–15 | 2015–16 | 2016–17 | 2017–18 | 2018–19 | 2017–18

The 2015–16 network television schedule for the four major Brazilian Portuguese commercial broadcast networks in Brazil covers primetime hours from April 2015 to March 2016.

The schedule is followed by a list per network of returning series, new series or telenovelas (soap operas), and series canceled after the 2014–15 season.

== Legend ==
- Gray indicates Encore Programming.
- Light green indicates live sporting events.
- Orange indicates movies.
- Light yellow indicates the current schedule.

== Schedule ==
- New series are highlighted in **bold**.
- All times are in Brasília time. Add one hour for Atlantic islands time, subtract one hour for Amazon time and two hours for Acre time.

=== Sunday ===
Network		8:00 PM	8:30 PM	9:00 PM	9:30 PM	10:00 PM	10:30 PM	11:00 PM	11:30 PM
Globo	Fall	Domingão do Faustão (Dança dos Famosos) (Os Iluminados Domingão)		Fantástico				SuperStar (10.92 rating)	
Globo	Winter	Domingão do Faustão (Dança dos Famosos) (Os Iluminados Domingão)		Fantástico				**Tomara Que Caia**	
Globo	Spring	Domingão do Faustão (Dança dos Famosos) (Os Iluminados Domingão)		Fantástico				TBA (11/1)	
Globo	Summer	Domingão do Faustão (Dança dos Famosos) (Os Iluminados Domingão)		Fantástico				Big Brother Brasil 16 (1/24)	
Record	Fall	Domingo Espetacular						Repórter em Ação	
Record	Winter	Domingo Espetacular						A Fazenda 8	
**SBT**		Programa Silvio Santos							
**Band**		#Top 20			Pânico na Band				
**Rede TV!**		Encrenca					Te Peguei na TV!		

=== Monday ===
Network		8:30 PM	9:00 PM	9:30 PM	10:00 PM	10:30 PM	11:00 PM	11:30 PM	12:00 PM
Globo	Fall	Jornal Nacional		**Babilônia** (27.20 rating)		**Verdades Secretas** (24.62 rating)		Tela Quente	
Globo	Winter	Jornal Nacional		**A Regra do Jogo**			Tela Quente		
Record	Fall	**Os Dez Mandamentos**		Jornal da Record		Gugu			
Record	Winter	**Os Dez Mandamentos**		Jornal da Record		Xuxa Meneghel			A Fazenda 8
Record	Spring	**Escrava Mãe** (11/16)		Jornal da Record		Xuxa Meneghel			TBA
SBT	Fall	Chiquititas		Carrossel		Programa do Ratinho		Máquina da Fama	
SBT	Winter	Cúmplices de um Resgate		Carrossel		Programa do Ratinho		Máquina da Fama	
Band	Fall	**Binbir Gece** (3.21 rating)		Show da Fé		CQC - Custe o Que Custar			
Band	Winter	**Fatmagül**		Show da Fé		CQC - Custe o Que Custar			

=== Tuesday ===
Network		8:30 PM	9:00 PM	9:30 PM	10:00 PM	10:30 PM	11:00 PM	11:30 PM	12:00 PM
Globo	Fall	Jornal Nacional		**Babilônia** (24.62 rating)		Tapas & Beijos (19.59 rating)		**Verdades Secretas** (17.68 rating)	
Globo	Winter	Jornal Nacional		**A Regra do Jogo**			**Mister Brau**		
Record	Fall	**Os Dez Mandamentos**		Jornal da Record		Gugu			
Record	Winter	**Os Dez Mandamentos**		Jornal da Record		A Fazenda 8			
SBT	Fall	Chiquititas		Carrossel		Programa do Ratinho			
SBT	Winter	Cúmplices de um Resgate		Carrossel		Programa do Ratinho			
Band	Fall	**Binbir Gece**		Show da Fé		MasterChef (7.16 rating)			
Band	Winter	**Fatmagül**		Show da Fé		A Liga			
Band	Spring	**Fatmagül**		Show da Fé		MasterChef Júnior (10/20)			

=== Wednesday ===
Network		8:30 PM	9:00 PM	9:30 PM	10:00 PM	10:30 PM	11:00 PM	11:30 PM	12:00 PM
Globo	Fall	Jornal Nacional	**Babilônia** (24.87 rating)		2015 Wednesday Football Night				
Globo	Winter	Jornal Nacional	**A Regra do Jogo**		2015 Wednesday Football Night				
Record	Fall	**Os Dez Mandamentos**		Jornal da Record		Gugu			
Record	Winter	**Os Dez Mandamentos**		Jornal da Record		**Cake Boss Brasil**		A Fazenda 8	
SBT	Fall	Chiquititas		Carrossel		Roda a Roda	Programa do Ratinho		
SBT	Winter	Cúmplices de um Resgate		Carrossel		Roda a Roda	Programa do Ratinho		
Band	Fall	**Binbir Gece**	Show da Fé		2015 Wednesday Football Night				
Band	Winter	**Fatmagül**	Show da Fé		2015 Wednesday Football Night				

=== Thursday ===
Network		8:30 PM	9:00 PM	9:30 PM	10:00 PM	10:30 PM	11:00 PM	11:30 PM	12:00 PM
Globo	Fall	Jornal Nacional		**Babilônia** (26.41 rating)		Chapa Quente (18.72 rating)		**Verdades Secretas**	
Globo	Winter	Jornal Nacional		**A Regra do Jogo**			The Voice Brasil		
Globo	Summer	Jornal Nacional		**A Regra do Jogo**			Big Brother Brasil 16		Tá no Ar
Record	Fall	**Os Dez Mandamentos**		Jornal da Record		Gugu			
Record	Winter	**Os Dez Mandamentos**		Jornal da Record		A Fazenda 8		**Troca de Família**	
SBT	Fall	Chiquititas	Carrossel		Programa do Ratinho		A Praça é Nossa		
SBT	Winter	Cúmplices	Carrossel		Programa do Ratinho		A Praça é Nossa		
Band	Fall	**Binbir Gece**		Show da Fé		Polícia 24h			
Band	Winter	**Fatmagül**		Show da Fé		Polícia 24h			

=== Friday ===
Network		8:30 PM	9:00 PM	9:30 PM	10:00 PM	10:30 PM	11:00 PM	11:30 PM	12:00 PM
Globo	Fall	Jornal Nacional		**Babilônia** (24.95 rating)		Globo Repórter		**Verdades Secretas**	
Globo	Winter	Jornal Nacional		**A Regra do Jogo**			Globo Repórter		
Record	Fall	**Os Dez Mandamentos**		Jornal da Record		Gugu			
Record	Winter	**Os Dez Mandamentos**		Jornal da Record		A Fazenda 8		Movie	
SBT	Fall	Chiquititas	Carrossel		Programa do Ratinho		Movie		
SBT	Winter	Cúmplices (8/3)	Carrossel		Programa do Ratinho		Movie		

== By network ==
=== Band ===
Returning series:

- Agora é Tarde (2015 season lasted only 16 episodes)

New series:

- Masterchef Junior
- Binbir Grace
- Fatmagül

Not returning from 2014–15:

- Sabe ou Não Sabe

Series going into hiatus:

- CQC: Custe o Que Custar

=== Globo ===
Returning series:

- The Voice Brasil
- Na Moral
- Amor & Sexo
- Tá no Ar: A TV na TV
- Superstar

New series:

- Chapa Quente
- Tomara Que Caia
- Verdades Secretas

New telenovelas:

- Além do Tempo (July 13)
- A Regra do Jogo (August 31)
- Totalmente Demais (November 2)

Not returning from 2014–15:

- A Grande Família

=== Record ===
Returning series:

- Prova de Amor (aired 2005)
- Dona Xepa (aired 2013)
- Chamas da Vida (aired 2009)
- Domingo Show
- Hora do Faro
- Programa da Sabrina
- Legendários

New series:

- Xuxa Meneghel

New telenovelas:

- Os Dez Mandamentos
- Escrava Mãe

Not returning from 2014–15:

- Me Leva Contigo

=== SBT ===
Returning series:

- Máquina da Fama
- Cozinha Sob Pressão (Hell's Kitchen)

New series:

- Bake-Off Brasil: Mão na Massa
- Acelerados
- Cúmplices de Um Resgate
- A Dona
- Turismo & Aventura
- Sabadão com Celso Portiolli
- Mundo Disney
- Pequenos Campeões

Not returning from 2014–15:

- Esse Artista Sou Eu
- Supernanny
- Patrulha Salvadora
- Vrum
- Planeta Turismo
- De Frente com Gabi
- Arena SBT
- Menino de Ouro

=== RedeTV! ===
New Series:

- Melhor Pra Você
- Sensacional com Daniela Alburquerque
- Chega Mais
- Documento Verdade
- Mariana Godoy Entrevista

Ongoing Shows:

- Encrenca
- A Tarde é Sua
- Mega Senha
- Você na TV
- Super Pop
- Luciana By Night
- Te Peguei
- Te Peguei na TV
- Ritmo Brasil
- Programa Amaury Jr.
- Leitura Dinâmica
- Operação de Risco
- Viagem Cultural
- É Notícia

Not Returning from 2014-15:

- The Bachelor: Em Busca do Grande Amor
- TV Kids
- Teste de Fidelidade
