= WPUT (AM) =

Brewster, New York; United States
- Frequency: 1510 kHz

Ownership
- Owner: Townsquare Media; (Townsquare Media Danbury License, LLC)

History
- First air date: 1963
- Last air date: November 5, 2014
- Former call signs: WBRW (1963–1967)

Technical information
- Facility ID: 67814
- Class: D
- Power: 1,000 watts day
- Transmitter coordinates: 41°24′34.3″N 73°37′27.5″W

WPUT (1510 AM) was a radio station licensed to Brewster, New York, United States. The station was owned and operated by Townsquare Media. The station operated on a Class D license and was in operation during daytime hours only, to protect Class-A clear-channel station WLAC in Nashville, Tennessee at night.

In December 2012, WPUT and WINE became affiliates of CBS Sports Radio.

On August 30, 2013, a deal was announced in which Townsquare Media would acquire 53 Cumulus Media stations, including WPUT, for $238 million. The deal was part of Cumulus' acquisition of Dial Global; Townsquare and Dial Global are both controlled by Oaktree Capital Management. The sale to Townsquare was completed on November 14, 2013.

WPUT signed off the air on November 5, 2014, at 3:42 PM. Townsquare Media would return WPUT's license to the FCC on May 18, 2015. The WPUT tower was eventually taken down and Townsquare then sold the Prospect Hill Rd property to a tree service company. An FM station in nearby North Salem would take on the WPUT call sign the following month; the two stations are not connected.
