= Marcos Soares (politician) =

Brazilian politician (born 1978)

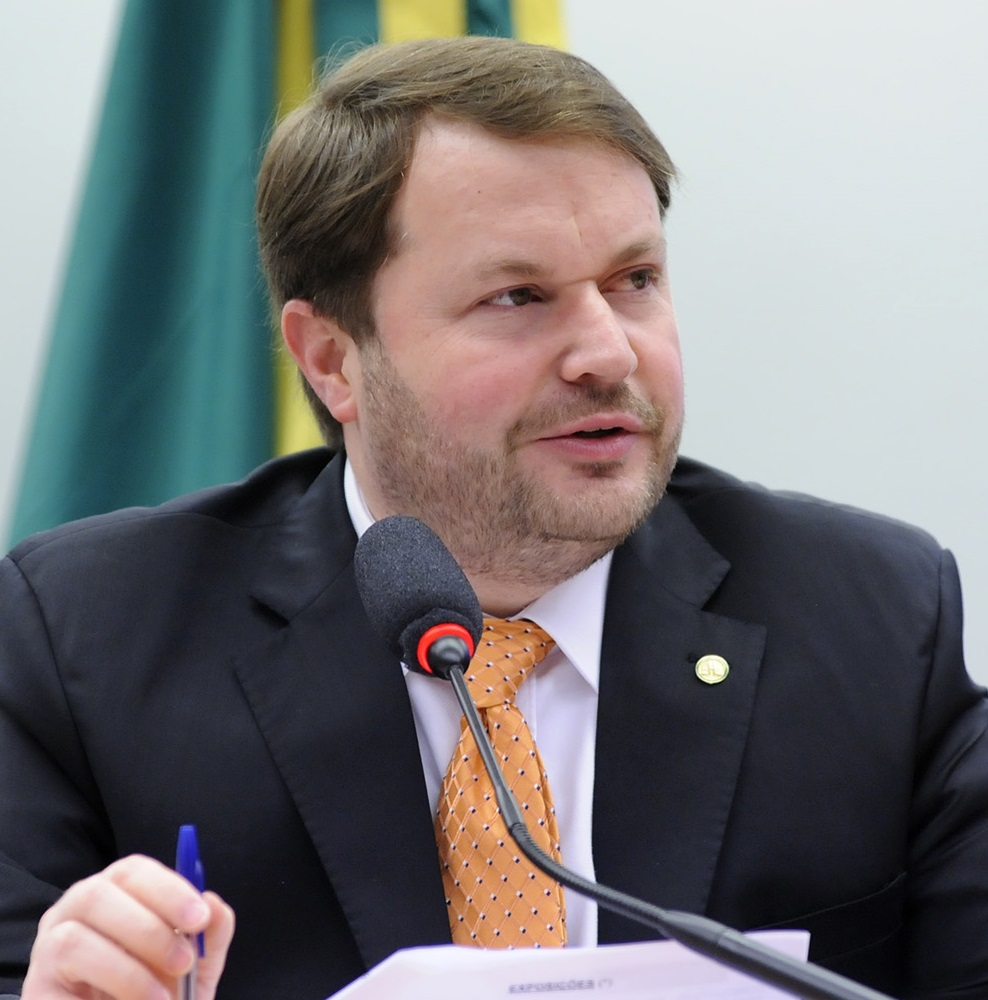
- Soares in 2017

Member of the Chamber of Deputies
- Incumbent
- Assumed office 1 February 2023
- Constituency: Rio de Janeiro
- In office 1 February 2015 – 31 January 2019
- Constituency: Rio de Janeiro

Personal details
- Born: 16 May 1978 (age 48)
- Party: Brazil Union (since 2022)
- Parent: R. R. Soares (father)
- Relatives: David Soares (brother); André Soares (brother); Daniel Soares (brother); Filipe Soares (brother)

Marcos Bezerra Ribeiro Soares (born 16 May 1978) is a Brazilian politician. He has been a member of the Chamber of Deputies since 2023, having previously served from 2015 to 2019. He is the son of R. R. Soares and the brother of David Soares, André Soares, Daniel Soares and Filipe Soares.
