= IBOPE =

Brazilian market research firm

- Type: Privately held company
- Industry: Media market (research)
- Founded: 1942
- Headquarters: São Paulo, São Paulo, Brazil
- Key people: Carlos Augusto Montenegro
- Products: Marketing research Audience measurement Advertising research
- Revenue: U$ 216 milhões (2007)
- Number of employees: 3,000
- Website: Kantar Ibope Media

The Brazilian Institute of Public Opinion and Statistics (IBOPE based on the Portuguese language name, Instituto Brasileiro de Opinião Pública e Estatística) is a Brazilian originated market research company. IBOPE provides data on media consumption and advertising investment across all Latin America.

Established in 1942, the name IBOPE is listed in the Brazilian dictionary as a synonym of audience ratings research.

== History ==
IBOPE was created in 1942 by the radio broadcaster Auricélio Penteado, owner of Radio Kosmos in São Paulo. In that year, he decided to apply research methodologies he had learned while studying in the United States under George Gallup, the founder of the American Institute of Public Opinion, in order to quantify the size of the audience of his broadcast in Brazil.

When he measured the radio audience in São Paulo, Auricélio proved that Radio Kosmos wasn't among the most listened to stations. Therefore, he would dedicate himself exclusively to research. In 1950, Penteado leaves the presidency of the company in charge to a group of directors.

In 1977, Paulo de Tarso Montenegro became the president of the company. One year later, he invited his children, Carlos Augusto Montenegro and Luís Paulo Montenegro, to join the company. IBOPE carried out the first voting intention polls, anticipating with extreme precision the outcome of electoral contests in the late 1970s.

In the 1990s, IBOPE partners with entrepreneurs in Mexico, Colombia, Venezuela, Ecuador, Peru, Chile and Argentina. From these partnerships, the company begins to supply consolidated data for Latin America cable TV. Currently, in addition to Brazil, the company has developed a leadership position across Latin America and a global footprint.

In 2014, IBOPE was acquired by WPP rebranding to Kantar IBOPE Media.

In 2025 H.I.G. acquired Kantar Media for U$1Billion.

== Measurement ==
A pioneer in media measurement, IBOPE revolutionized television audience measurement in 1988 by launching the world's first real-time tracking system.

IBOPE's proprietary 'peoplemeter' technology provides a granular, second-by-second analysis of viewer behavior within a representative sample of households.

The device sends, by cell phone system, the information of all changes made by the viewer channel to a central collection of indices that processes, analyzes and distributes to customers.

The system of television audience measurement in real time is used all around Latin America.

Beyond traditional broadcast, IBOPE's measurement capabilities have evolved to encompass cross-platform viewership.

=== Top-rated programs ===
This table lists all the TV shows with the highest average household IBOPE rating for each television season.

The program with the all-time highest average rating is in bold text
Sports programs have italicized rating numbers
Two or more programs tie for highest average IBOPE rating in the same season

Season	Program	Network	Rating
1985-86	Roque Santeiro	Globo	**67**
1986-87	Selva de Pedra	Globo	60
1987-88	O Outro	Globo	57
1988-89	Vale Tudo	Globo	56
1989-90	Tieta	Globo	63
1990-91	Rainha da Sucata	Globo	59
1991-92	O Dono do Mundo	Globo	47
1992-93	Pedra sobre Pedra	Globo	57.0
1993-94	Renascer	Globo	61
1994-95	Pátria Minha	Globo	45.0
1995-96	A Próxima Vítima; Explode Coração	Globo	47
1996-97	O Rei do Gado	Globo	52.0
1997-98	A Indomada	Globo	48.0
1998-99	Torre de Babel	Globo	44.0
1999-00	Terra Nostra	Globo	44.0
2000-01	Laços de Família	Globo	45.0
2001-02	O Clone	Globo	47.0
2002-03	2002 FIFA World Cup	Globo	45.0
2003-04	Mulheres Apaixonadas	Globo	46.6
2004-05	Senhora do Destino	Globo	50.4
2005-06	América	Globo	49.4
2006-07	Páginas da Vida	Globo	46.8
2007-08	Paraíso Tropical	Globo	43.8
2008-09	A Favorita	Globo	39.5
2009-10	Caminho das Índias	Globo	38.8
2010-11	2010 FIFA World Cup	Globo	38.0
2011-12	Fina Estampa	Globo	39.0
2012-13	Avenida Brasil	Globo	39.0
2013-14	Amor à Vida	Globo	36.0
2014-15	Império	Globo	32.6

== Legacy Divisions ==
IBOPE Inteligência supplied market, behavior, brand, public opinion and internet research, used by clients to develop business strategies in organization, marketing and products development. Additionally, many organizations use research to broaden innovation.

IBOPE Educação was in the market of executive education, training professionals involved in strategic decision making. It integrated in its academic content current and exclusive information from the Group, maximizing the potential of contributions to achieving results.

And IBOPE Ambiental was a business unit performing in the environmental area with services aimed at environmental sustainability

== See also ==
- Kantar Media
- Brazilian Institute of Geography and Statistics
