= List of Louco por Elas episodes =

Louco por Elas is a Brazilian television sitcom that premiered on Rede Globo on March 13, 2012. It stars Eduardo Moscovis, Deborah Secco, Glória Menezes, Laura Barreto, and Luisa Arraes. The second season aired between October 30, 2012 and December 18, 2012 with 8 episodes produced.

The final season premiered on January 22, 2013 and ended on June 25, 2013.

== Series overview ==
Season	Episodes	Originally released	
Season	Episodes	First released	Last released
1	14	March 13, 2012	June 12, 2012
2	8	October 30, 2012	December 18, 2012
3	22	January 22, 2013	June 18, 2013

== Episodes ==
=== Season 1 (2012) ===
No. overall	No. in season	Title	Directed by	IBOPE Rating (São Paulo)	Original release date	Brazil viewers (millions)
1	1	"Pilot" "Léo Se Decepciona ao Descobrir Título de Livro"	Flávia Lacerda, Allan Fiterman and João Falcão	15	March 13, 2012	9,10
2	2	"Léo Fica Encantado com a Beleza de Sofia"	Flávia Lacerda, Allan Fiterman and João Falcão	16	March 20, 2012	9,08
3	3	"Violeta Faz Todos Embarcarem em Sua Loucura"	Flávia Lacerda, Allan Fiterman and João Falcão	14	March 27, 2012	7,96
4	4	"Mãe de Léo Volta para Provar que Mudou"	Flávia Lacerda, Allan Fiterman and João Falcão	15	April 3, 2012	N/A
5	5	"Léo Não Mede Esforços para Reconquistar Giovana"	Flávia Lacerda, Allan Fiterman and João Falcão	16	April 10, 2012	N/A
6	6	"Campeonato de Futebol Enlouquece Léo"	Flávia Lacerda, Allan Fiterman and João Falcão	17	April 17, 2012	N/A
7	7	"Léo Passa Mal e Precisa Ser Operado"	Flávia Lacerda, Allan Fiterman and João Falcão	17	April 24, 2012	N/A
8	8	"Léo Dá Jantar Para Provar Que Não É Ciumento"	Flávia Lacerda, Allan Fiterman and João Falcão	17	May 1, 2012	N/A
9	9	"Léo Vai a Exposição de Arte e se Faz de Culto"	Flávia Lacerda, Allan Fiterman and João Falcão	18	May 8, 2012	N/A
10	10	"Léo Planeja Escalar a Montanha da Morte"	Flávia Lacerda, Allan Fiterman and João Falcão	16	May 15, 2012	N/A
11	11	"Léo Posa Como Modelo e Salva a Família"	Flávia Lacerda, Allan Fiterman and João Falcão	17	May 22, 2012	N/A
12	12	"Giovana Recebe Proposta de Trabalho em Londres"	Flávia Lacerda, Allan Fiterman and João Falcão	15	May 29, 2012	N/A
13	13	"Léo faz Giovana Abrir o Jogo Sobre Passado Para Ajudar Bárbara"	Flávia Lacerda, Allan Fiterman and João Falcão	16	June 5, 2012	N/A
14	14	"Ex-namoradas de Léo Se Reúnem Para Falar Mal do Conquistador"	Flávia Lacerda, Allan Fiterman and João Falcão	16	June 12, 2012	N/A

=== Season 2 (2012) ===
No. overall	No. in season	Title	Directed by	IBOPE Rating (São Paulo)	Original release date	Brazil viewers (millions)
15	1	"Giovana Aparece com Novo Namorado"	Flávia Lacerda, Allan Fiterman and João Falcão	15	October 30, 2012	N/A
16	2	"Léo Lida com Mulheres à Beira de Crise de Identidade"	Flávia Lacerda, Allan Fiterman and João Falcão	16	November 6, 2012	N/A
17	3	"Violeta ganha herança... E duas irmãs de brinde"	Flávia Lacerda, Allan Fiterman and João Falcão	18	November 13, 2012	N/A
18	4	"Giovana arranja garotão e Léo fica se sentindo o maior coroa"	Flávia Lacerda, Allan Fiterman and João Falcão	15	November 20, 2013	N/A
19	5	"Violeta organiza sarau para lançar Santiago"	Flávia Lacerda, Allan Fiterman and João Falcão	16	November 27, 2012	N/A
20	6	"Léo enfrenta ex-rival e atrapalha namoro de Giovana"	Flávia Lacerda, Allan Fiterman and João Falcão	16	December 4, 2012	N/A
21	7	"Léo é apontado como novo affair de celebridade"	Flávia Lacerda, Allan Fiterman and João Falcão	14	December 11, 2012	N/A
22	8	"O Natal"	Flávia Lacerda, Allan Fiterman and João Falcão	14	December 18, 2012	9,67

=== Season 3 (2013) ===
No. overall	No. in season	Title	Directed by	IBOPE Rating (São Paulo)	Original release date
23	1	"Theodora se apaixona e sofre com ciúmes do pai"	Flávia Lacerda, Allan Fiterman and João Falcão	14	January 22, 2012
24	2	"Veruska entra na casa de Léo sem revelar que é seu pai"	Flávia Lacerda, Allan Fiterman and João Falcão	14	January 29, 2013
25	3	"Mãe de Giovana vem da Itália para encontrar a filha"	Flávia Lacerda, Allan Fiterman and João Falcão	14	February 5, 2013
26	4	"Léo reencontra sua primeira namorada"	Flávia Lacerda, Allan Fiterman and João Falcão	17	February 12, 2013
27	5	"O Ursinho de Pelúcia do Léo"	Flávia Lacerda, Allan Fiterman and João Falcão	13	February 19, 2013
28	6	"Namoro de Bárbara causa ciúmes em Léo"	Flávia Lacerda, Allan Fiterman and João Falcão	13	February 26, 2013
29	7	"O Descasamento de Léo e Giovana"	Flávia Lacerda, Allan Fiterman and João Falcão	12	March 5, 2013
30	8	"Os Amigos de Léo e Giovana"	Flávia Lacerda, Allan Fiterman and João Falcão	13	March 12, 2013
31	9	"Amizade Colorida" "Giovana on TV"	Flávia Lacerda, Allan Fiterman and João Falcão	15	March 19, 2013
32	10	"Giovana se mete em briga de casal"	Flávia Lacerda, Allan Fiterman and João Falcão	16	March 26, 2013
33	11	"A Volta de Veruska"	Flávia Lacerda, Allan Fiterman and João Falcão	15	April 2, 2013
34	12	"Maus exemplos?!"	Flávia Lacerda, Allan Fiterman and João Falcão	17	April 9, 2013
35	13	"Léo se sente rejeitado pelo time"	Flávia Lacerda, Allan Fiterman and João Falcão	17	April 16, 2013
36	14	"Partiu Fla-Flu!" "A Fla-Flu problem"	Flávia Lacerda, Allan Fiterman and João Falcão	17	April 23, 2013
37	15	"Giovana posa para calendário"	Flávia Lacerda, Allan Fiterman and João Falcão	15	April 30, 2013
38	16	"O Melhor Dia das Mães de todos"	Flávia Lacerda, Allan Fiterman and João Falcão	15	May 7, 2013
39	17	"O Primo"	Flávia Lacerda, Allan Fiterman and João Falcão	15	May 14, 2013
40	18	"Léo tenta reviver primeira noite com Giovana"	Flávia Lacerda, Allan Fiterman and João Falcão	15	May 21, 2013
41	19	"Léo e Giovana não lembram o que fizeram na noite passada"	Flávia Lacerda, Allan Fiterman and João Falcão	15	May 28, 2013
42	20	"Amados amantes!"	Flávia Lacerda, Allan Fiterman and João Falcão	14	June 4, 2013
43	21	"O Casamento de Dorothy"	Flávia Lacerda, Allan Fiterman and João Falcão	17	June 11, 2013
44	22	"Louco Por Elas" "Series finale"	Flávia Lacerda, Allan Fiterman and João Falcão	15	June 18, 2013
