= Haysam Ali =

Brazilian-American actor and entrepreneur

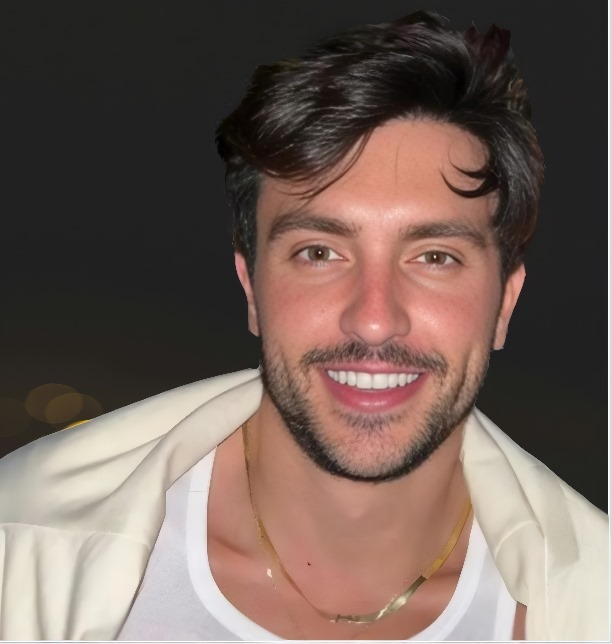
- Born: May 10, 1988 (age 37); São Paulo, Brazil
- Citizenship: Brazilian, American and Italian
- Occupations: Actor, TV presenter and businessman
- Years active: 2009–present

Haysam Ali (born May 10, 1988) is a Brazilian-American actor. He is best known for portraying the serial killer nicknamed the “Vampire of Niteroi” and for his lead role as Henry Costa in Play (2024). In the United States, he played Prior Walter in a theatrical adaptation of Angels in America, a character defined by the AIDS stigma of the 1980s. Early in his career, he worked in event promotions and digital marketing, in addition to participating in the reality show A Fazenda de Verao (2012).

== Early life ==
Haysam Ali was born in São Paulo on May 10, 1988. His father is Lebanese and his mother is Brazilian.

== Education ==
In 2022, he attended Stella Adler Studio of Acting in Los Angeles.

== Career ==
Ali started out his career in event promotions, in 2009. He created a circuit in São Paulo called “Circuito Velvet Club" and held the first LGBTQA+ event at Buddha Bar at the former Daslu Building, which featured Dj Samantha Ronson. Later he transformed the helipad at the Tivoli Mofarrej Hotel into a dance floor.

In 2010, Ali was involved in creating a petition and collecting 100,000 signatures to bring Lady Gaga to Brazil.

In 2012, Ali was invited to be a cast member of the reality TV show Fazenda de Verão. He left the show after 43 days in the house due to mental health concerns that were triggered by the stress and pressure of being bullied during his time on the show.

In 2014, he launched a blog called Sem Censura which featured interviews with Brazilian celebrities such as Ticiane Pinhero. The blog was in a form of a TV show.

In 2017, he moved to New York and ran a digital marketing agency working with brands such AT&T and Frontier Communications.

In 2022, he moved to Los Angeles to invest full time in his acting career. He studied at Stella Adler Studio of Acting.

In 2024, Ali appeared in a short film called Play as the lead actor. The film aims to raise awareness about bullying.

In 2024, it was announced that he would play the murderer Marcelo Costa de Andrade, better known as the 'vampire de Niterói', in a play in Los Angeles.

In 2025, Haysam played the role of Benvolio in a Romeo & Juliet remake in Los Angeles, California. Also in 2025, Haysam Ali played Prior Walter in a Los Angeles production of “Angels in America”, portraying an HIV-positive character whose journey confronts the stigma surrounding the AIDS epidemic of the 1980s and the effects of treatment with AZT. Haysam Ali was the only American-Brazilian actor in the cast.

== Filmography ==
- 2012, Fazenda de Verao as self
- 2024, Play as Henry Costa
