= Louco por Elas =

- English title-card.
- Also known as: Crazy About Them (US/UK); Loco por Ellas (ES)
- Created by: Adriana Falcão; Clarice Falcão; Jo Abdu; Gregório Duvivier
- Starring: Eduardo Moscovis; Deborah Secco; Glória Menezes; Laura Barreto and Luisa Arraes
- Opening theme: Mamãe Passou Açúcar em Mim
- Composer: Tiago Abravanel
- Country of origin: Brazil
- Original language: Portuguese
- No. of seasons: 3
- No. of episodes: 43 (list of episodes)

Production
- Producer: Daniel Vicent
- Production locations: Rio de Janeiro, Brazil
- Editor: Fábio Jordão
- Camera setup: Multi-camera
- Running time: 45 minutes
- Production company: Central Globo de Produção

Original release
- Network: Rede Globo
- Release: March 13, 2012 – June 25, 2013

Louco por Elas (English: Crazy About Them) is a Brazilian television sitcom that premiered on Rede Globo on March 13, 2012. It stars Eduardo Moscovis, Deborah Secco, Glória Menezes, Laura Barreto, and Luisa Arraes. The second season aired between October 30, 2012, and December 18, 2012, with eight episodes produced.

The third season premiered on January 22, 2013, and ended on June 25, 2013.

== Plot ==
Leo (Eduardo Moscovis) is a beach soccer coach of an all-girl team who lives amid women. He lives in a big house with his lighthearted grandmother Violeta (Glória Menezes, witty teenage ex-stepdaughter Barbara (Luisa Arraes), and precocious daughter Theodora (Laura Barreto). Violeta's nutty attitude and open way of speaking keeps everyone in high spirits. She also manages to stage some of her wackiness whenever she finds it necessary in order to get her way. Theodora, the youngest member of the house, absolutely adores her grandmother and is the one who relates the most to her dreamy world. She is also very intelligent and constantly renders unexpected bold comments to everyone. Barbara's sweet nature isn't totally eclipsed by her typical teenage moodiness.

Leo is not only her soccer coach but also her father figure. She ended up living with him instead of with her mother Giovanna (Deborah Secco), but she never loses a chance to pick an argument with her ex-stepfather. As if dealing with all these women under the same roof weren't enough, Leo's ex-wife Giovanna is always around to stir things up. They decided to go their separate ways but hardly succeed in staying away from each other, since they are still in love and both daughters live with him. Giovanna is content with her thriving career as an author but suffers from the occasional guilt of having to juggle it with her role as a dedicated mother. Giovanna and Leo have an unresolved romantic issue between them which accounts for much jealousy and hilarious misconduct when it comes to each other's dating life.

Meanwhile, Leo's patience and sanity is put to test as he tries to deal with the many different women in his life, not to mention their contrasting problems and erratic behaviors. Caught in the middle of a parade of anxious soccer players, wacky family members, and potential girlfriends who come his way, Leo would have it no other way. In a comical attempt to satisfy their every whim, he renders an inside look at the souls of the women he adores in Crazy About Them.

== Cast ==
Actor	Character
Eduardo Moscovis	Leonardo "Léo" Henrique Santiago
Deborah Secco	Giovanna Bianchi
Glória Menezes	Violeta Santiago / Dolores / Gertrudes
Luisa Arraes	Bárbara Bianchi
Laura Barreto	Teodora Bianchi Santiago

=== Recurrent ===
Actor	Character
Luana Martau	Dorothy
Aracy Balabanian	Cândida
Carlos Casagrande	Roberto
Fabrício Belsoff	Felipe
Reginaldo Faria	Geraldo/Veruska (Léo dad's)
Marcella Rica	Sandra (Sandrão)
Bellatrix Serra	Moema
Raquel Bonfante	Carolina (Teodora friend)
Ana Lúcia Torre	Dra. Olga
Gregório Duvivier	Corrector Marcos

== Episodes ==
Season	Episodes	Originally released	
Season	Episodes	First released	Last released
1	14	March 13, 2012	June 12, 2012
2	8	October 30, 2012	December 18, 2012
3	22	January 22, 2013	June 18, 2013

== Reception ==
=== Ratings ===
Season	Episodes	Timeslot (UTC-03)	Original airing			Rank	Rating average
Season	Episodes	Timeslot (UTC-03)	Season premiere	Season finale	TV season	Rank	Rating average
1st	14	Tuesday 11:00 PM	March 13, 2012	June 12, 2012	2012	—	16
2nd	8	Tuesday 11:00 PM	October 30, 2012	December 18, 2012	2012	—	15
3rd	22	Tuesday 11:00 PM	January 22, 2013	June 18, 2013	2013-14	—	TBA

=== Awards and nominations ===
Year	Award	Category	Nomination	Result
2012	Prêmio Extra	Melhor Estreia	Louco por Elas	Nominated
2013	Prêmio Contigo! de TV	Melhor Série	Louco por Elas	Nominated
2013	Prêmio Contigo! de TV	Ator de Série/Minissérie	Eduardo Moscovis	Nominated
2013	Prêmio Contigo! de TV	Atriz de Série/Minissérie	Deborah Secco	Nominated
2013	Prêmio Contigo! de TV	Atriz de Série/Minissérie	Glória Menezes	Nominated
2013	Prêmio Contigo! de TV	Revelação	Luisa Arraes	Nominated
2013	Prêmio Contigo! de TV	Atriz Mirim	Laura Barreto	Nominated
