= Fazenda de Verão =

Brazilian reality television show

- Fazenda de Verão title card.
- Genre: Reality show
- Created by: Strix Television; Sony Pictures Television
- Developed by: 2waytraffic Endemol
- Directed by: Rodrigo Carelli
- Presented by: Rodrigo Faro
- Country of origin: Brazil
- Original language: Portuguese
- No. of seasons: 1
- No. of episodes: 79

Production
- Production locations: Itu, São Paulo, Brazil
- Running time: 60 minutes

Original release
- Network: RecordTV
- Release: October 31, 2012 – January 30, 2013

Related
- A Fazenda

Fazenda de Verão (English: Summer Farm) was a Brazilian reality television show, which premiered on October 31, 2012 during the Southern Hemisphere summer. It was broadcast by RecordTV television network.

The series was a spin-off of A Fazenda, but with ordinary people, instead of the celebrities playing the role of housemates. Rodrigo Faro was the host, replacing Britto Junior from the main celebrity version. The grand prize was R$1 million with tax allowances.

On March 26, 2013, it was confirmed that the series had been canceled and would not be returning for a second season.

== Format ==
The show features 22 contestants who are sequestered in the Farm with no contact to or from the outside world. while having all their steps followed by cameras around-the-clock. Each week, the contestants take part in several compulsory challenges that determine who will win the power in the Farm.

Each housemate must nominate one of their fellow housemates to face the public vote. "Voting to save" was used for the public vote as opposed to the "vote to evict" method generally used in main celebrity series.

== Seasons ==
Season	Winner	Runner-Up	Third Place	Contestants
1	Angelis Borges	Ísis Gomes	Thyago Gesta	22

=== Ratings ===
All numbers are in points and provided by IBOPE.

Season	Timeslot (BRST)	Episodes	Premiered		Ended		TV season	Viewers (in points)
Season	Timeslot (BRST)	Episodes	Date	Premiere viewers (in points)	Date	Finale viewers (in points)	TV season	Viewers (in points)
1	Monday to Saturday; 11:15 pm	79	October 31, 2012	14	January 30, 2013	10	2012	7

- Each point represents 60.000 households in São Paulo.

== Season 1 (2012) ==
Fazenda de Verão
- No. of days: 93
- No. of housemates: 22
- Winner: Angelis Borges
- Runner-up: Ísis Gomes

=== Production ===
National applications run from September 7, 2012 until October 19, 2012. Out of more than 64.000 applicants, 200 were chosen as semi-finalists for an interview during October 2012.

From these semi-finalists, twenty-two were chosen to participate in the show between October 2012 to January 2013.

=== Contestants ===
The cast list was released four different days: the first six contestants (Claudia, Dan, Haysam, Ísis, Karine and Rodrigo S.) were revealed on October 25; another six (Bianca, Flávia, Halan, Nuelle, Rodrigo C. and Sacramento) on October 26; four more (Gabriela, Natália, Thyago and Victor) on October 28. The final four contestants (Angelis, Cacá, Leandro and Raphael) were revealed on November 1, as part of a twist on this season.

Biographical information according to Record official series site, plus footnoted additions.
(ages stated are at time of contest)

Contestant	Age	Background	Hometown	Status	Finish
Leandro Kloppel	29	DJ	São Caetano do Sul	Did not enter on November 6, 2012	22nd/21st
Cacá Werneck	28	DJ	Rio de Janeiro	Did not enter on November 6, 2012	22nd/21st
Claudia Kramer	27	Dancer	Guaíba	1st Out on November 8, 2012	20th
Gabriela Novaes	22	Officer	Juazeiro	2nd Out on November 15, 2012	19th
Rodrigo Simões	32	Personal Trainer	São Paulo	1st Walk Away on November 19, 2012	18th
Halan Assakura	23	Advertiser	São Paulo	2nd Walk Away on November 22, 2012	17th
Bianca Luperini	20	Student	Araras	3rd Out on November 22, 2012	16th
Sacramento	40	Model	Salvador	4th Out on November 29, 2012	15th
Lucas Barreto	24	Model	Rio de Janeiro	Ejected on December 3, 2012	14th
Nuelle Alves	23	Model	Jaraguá	5th Out on December 6, 2012	13th
Haysam Ali	24	Advertiser	São Paulo	3rd Walk Away on December 11, 2012	12th
Raphael Machado	26	Cooling Technician	Rio de Janeiro	6th Out on December 14, 2012	11th
Rodrigo Carril	25	Lawyer	Porto Alegre	7th Out on December 20, 2012	10th
Natália Inoue	26	Model	Curitiba	8th Out on December 27, 2012	9th
Karine Dornelas	19	Student	Japeri	9th Out on January 3, 2013	8th
Flávia Armond	32	Dentist	Mariana	10th Out on January 10, 2013	7th
Dan Waineraich	31	Model	Rio de Janeiro	11th Out on January 17, 2013	6th
Manoella Stoltz	27	Fashion Designer	Curitiba	12th Out on January 24, 2013	5th
Victor Hugo Aviz	21	Model & Student	Balneário Camboriú	13th Out on January 28, 2013	4th
Thyago Gesta	28	Businessman	Rio de Janeiro	Third place on January 30, 2013	3rd
Ísis Gomes	27	Model	Porto Alegre	Runner-up on January 30, 2013	2nd
Angelis Borges	27	Publicist	Uberlândia	Winner on January 30, 2013	1st

==== Guest ====
Name	Age	Background	Days in the farm
Nicole Bahls	26	A Fazenda 5 contestant	Days 68–70

=== Voting history ===
Key
– Contestant is a member of Team Ant and have to do all the work in the farm.
– Contestant is a member of Team Cicada and is not allow to work in the farm.

	Week 1		Week 2	Week 3	Week 4	Week 5	Week 6	Week 7	Week 8	Week 9	Week 10	Week 11	Week 12	Week 13		Total votes
	Day 3	Day 8	Week 2	Week 3	Week 4	Week 5	Week 6	Week 7	Week 8	Week 9	Week 10	Week 11	Week 12	Day 89	Finale	Total votes
1st Nominee (by House Vote)	(none)	Claudia	Rodrigo S.	Angelis	Sacramento	Angelis	Thyago	Rodrigo C.	Natália	Karine	Flávia; Manoella	Dan; Most Votes	Angelis; Challenge	(none)		
Team Nominations	(none)	Sacramento; Bianca	Nuelle; Gabriela	Bianca; Raphael	Nuelle; Angelis	Manoella; Nuelle	Angelis; Raphael	Ísis; Angelis	Dan; Angelis	Victor; Ísis	Flávia; Manoella	(none)		(none)		
2nd Nominee (by 1st Nominee)	(none)	Bianca	Gabriela	Bianca	Angelis	Nuelle	Raphael	Angelis	Angelis	Victor	Flávia; Manoella	Manoella; Not Saved	Manoella; Most Votes	(none)		
Angelis	Barn	Not in the Farm	Haysam; Bianca	Haysam; Rodrigo C.	Sacramento; Rodrigo C.	Rodrigo C. Raphael	Thyago; Victor	Banned	~~Flávia~~; Karine	Karine; Victor	No Voting	Victor	Ísis	Nominated	Winner (Day 93)	39
Ísis	Not eligible	Bianca; Rodrigo C.	Gabriela; Gabriela	Angelis; Raphael	Sacramento; Raphael	Manoella; Manoella	Thyago; Raphael	Angelis; Dan	~~Flávia~~; Dan	Manoella; Manoella	No Voting	Dan	Manoella	Nominated	Runner-up (Day 93)	12
Thyago	Not eligible	Claudia; Bianca	Sacramento; Nuelle	Angelis; Nuelle	Angelis; Nuelle	Angelis; Nuelle	Manoella; Karine	Rodrigo C. Karine	~~Flávia~~; Karine	Flávia; Victor	No Voting	Dan	Manoella	Saved	Third Place (Day 93)	14
Victor	Not eligible	Bianca; Gabriela	Nuelle; Gabriela	Angelis; Raphael	Angelis; Nuelle	Angelis; Nuelle	Manoella; Angelis	Rodrigo C. Angelis	Manoella; Angelis	Manoella; Thyago	Flávia; Manoella	Dan	Manoella	Nominated	Evicted (Day 91)	6
Manoella	Not in the Farm				Thyago; Thyago	Raphael; Raphael	Thyago; Raphael	Rodrigo C. Dan	~~Flávia~~; Dan	Karine; Ísis	Nominated	Victor	Ísis	Evicted (Day 87)		25
Dan	Not eligible	Bianca; Gabriela	Karine; Gabriela	Angelis; Raphael	Angelis; Angelis	Angelis; Manoella	Thyago; Manoella	Angelis; Ísis	Natália; Manoella	Karine; Ísis	No Voting	Thyago	Evicted (Day 80)			8
Flávia	Not eligible	Claudia; Sacramento	Rodrigo S. Sacramento	Angelis; Raphael	Sacramento; Raphael	Manoella; Manoella	Thyago; Raphael	Angelis; Ísis	Natália; Manoella	Karine; Ísis	Nominated	Evicted (Day 73)				3
Karine	Not eligible	Claudia; Bianca	Rodrigo S. Halan	Angelis; Bianca	Sacramento; Nuelle	Manoella; Nuelle	Thyago; Angelis	Rodrigo C. Angelis	~~Flávia~~; Angelis	Manoella; Thyago	Evicted (Day 66)					14
Natália	Not eligible	Claudia; Bianca	Rodrigo S. Nuelle	Angelis; Nuelle	Sacramento; Nuelle	Nuelle; Nuelle	Thyago; Angelis	Rodrigo C. Angelis	~~Flávia~~; Angelis	Evicted (Day 59)						11
Rodrigo C.	Not eligible	Bianca; Ísis	Nuelle; Gabriela	Angelis; Raphael	Angelis; Angelis	Angelis; Manoella	Thyago; Manoella	Angelis; Ísis	Evicted (Day 52)							12
Raphael	Barn	Not in the Farm	Haysam; Flávia	Angelis; Ísis	Dan; Rodrigo C.	Manoella; Manoella	Ísis; Manoella	Evicted (Day 46)								14
Haysam	Not eligible	Claudia; Bianca	Rodrigo S. Karine	Angelis; Bianca	Sacramento; Nuelle	Raphael; Nuelle	Walk Away (Day 43)									6
Nuelle	Not eligible	Claudia; Natália	Natália; Natália	Angelis; Natália	Victor; Thyago	Natália; Natália	Evicted (Day 38)									17
Lucas	Not in the Farm					Ejected (Day 35)										0
Sacramento	Not eligible	Halan; Gabriela	Rodrigo C. Rodrigo C.	Angelis; ~~Ísis~~	Angelis; Angelis	Evicted (Day 31)										16
Bianca	Not eligible	Claudia; Karine	Rodrigo S. Karine	Angelis; Natália	Evicted (Day 24)											13
Halan	Not eligible	Sacramento; Karine	Sacramento; Karine	Angelis; Bianca	Walk Away (Day 24)											2
Rodrigo S.	Not eligible	Claudia; Bianca	Haysam; Haysam	Walk Away (Day 21)												4
Gabriela	Not eligible	Sacramento; Sacramento	Natália; Ísis	Evicted (Day 17)												8
Claudia	Not eligible	Haysam; Sacramento	Evicted (Day 10)													8
Cacá	Barn	Evicted (Day 8)														0
Leandro	Barn	Evicted (Day 8)														0
Notes	1	(none)		2	3	4, 5	6, 7	8	9, 10	11	12	13	14	15	(none)	
Nominated for Eviction	Leandro; Raphael	Bianca; Claudia	Gabriela; Rodrigo S.	Angelis; Bianca	Angelis; Sacramento	Angelis; Nuelle	Raphael; Thyago	Angelis; Rodrigo C.	Angelis; Natália	Karine; Victor	Flávia; Manoella	Dan; Manoella	Angelis; Manoella	Angelis; Ísis; Victor	Angelis; Ísis; Thyago	
Nominated for Eviction	Angelis; Cacá	Bianca; Claudia	Gabriela; Rodrigo S.	Angelis; Bianca	Angelis; Sacramento	Angelis; Nuelle	Raphael; Thyago	Angelis; Rodrigo C.	Angelis; Natália	Karine; Victor	Flávia; Manoella	Dan; Manoella	Angelis; Manoella	Angelis; Ísis; Victor	Angelis; Ísis; Thyago	
Walk Away	(none)			Rodrigo S. Halan	(none)		Haysam	(none)								
Ejected	(none)					Lucas	(none)									
Evicted	Leandro; 29.83% to enter	Claudia; 49.20% to save	Gabriela; 29% to save	Bianca; 26% to save	Sacramento; 29% to save	Nuelle; 27% to save	Raphael; 32% to save	Rodrigo C. 36% to save	Natália; 32% to save	Karine; 26% to save	Flávia; 47% to save	Dan; 46% to save	Manoella; 32% to save	Victor; 12% to save	Thyago; 8% to win	
Evicted	Leandro; 29.83% to enter	Claudia; 49.20% to save	Gabriela; 29% to save	Bianca; 26% to save	Sacramento; 29% to save	Nuelle; 27% to save	Raphael; 32% to save	Rodrigo C. 36% to save	Natália; 32% to save	Karine; 26% to save	Flávia; 47% to save	Dan; 46% to save	Manoella; 32% to save	Victor; 12% to save	Ísis; 23% to win	
Evicted	Cacá; 42.11% to enter	Claudia; 49.20% to save	Gabriela; 29% to save	Bianca; 26% to save	Sacramento; 29% to save	Nuelle; 27% to save	Raphael; 32% to save	Rodrigo C. 36% to save	Natália; 32% to save	Karine; 26% to save	Flávia; 47% to save	Dan; 46% to save	Manoella; 32% to save	Victor; 12% to save	Ísis; 23% to win	
Evicted	Cacá; 42.11% to enter	Claudia; 49.20% to save	Gabriela; 29% to save	Bianca; 26% to save	Sacramento; 29% to save	Nuelle; 27% to save	Raphael; 32% to save	Rodrigo C. 36% to save	Natália; 32% to save	Karine; 26% to save	Flávia; 47% to save	Dan; 46% to save	Manoella; 32% to save	Victor; 12% to save	Angelis; 69% to win	

==== Notes ====
- ^Note 1: During the first week, Angelis, Cacá, Leandro and Raphael lived in the barn and the public voted for two of them (1 man and 1 woman) to enter in the main house. Cacá and Leandro received the fewest votes to enter and therefore, were both evicted on day 8.
- ^Note 2: Sacramento accidentally revealed his secret vote on Isis, so his second nomination was void.
- ^Note 3: For winning the duel, Haysam won the right to open a mystery envelope. It was revealed during the nominations that he won R$10,000. He should also give immunity to someone from his team (including himself). He chose to give immunity to Natália.
- ^Note 4: Lucas entered in the farm after the nominations of week 4 and six days later was ejected for misconduct.
- ^Note 5: Angelis and Manoella received the most nominations in the first round with 4 each. Team Cicada decided as a group, that Angelis would be the first nominee.
- ^Note 6: For winning the duel, Natália won the right to open a mystery envelope. It was revealed during the nominations that she gained an immunity and the power of decide the casting votes. Raphael and Manoella received the most nominations in Team Ant with 3 each and Natália decided that Raphael would be the team nominee. Finally she decided that Raphael would be the second nominee instead of Angelis (the Team Cicada nominee).
- ^Note 7: Exceptionally, this eviction took place on Friday (day 46) due to the Rede Record's broadcast of the Ídolos 2012 two-hour season finale on Thursday night.
- ^Note 8: For winning the duel, Rodrigo C. won the right to open a mystery envelope. It was revealed during the nominations that he gained the power to exclude a participant from voting. He chose Angelis.
- ^Note 9: Dan and Manoella received the most nominations in Team Ant with 2 each. Isis, the immune of the week, chose Dan to be the team nominee.
- ^Note 10: For winning the duel, Dan won the right to open a mystery envelope. It was revealed during the nominations that he gained a power to overthrow the house votes after the nominations. He had the casting vote and chose Natália to replace Flávia as first nominee and the six votes against her did not count.
- ^Note 11: Thyago and Victor received the most nominations in Team Ant with 2 each. Angelis, the immune of the week, chose Victor to be the team nominee.
- ^Note 12: For winning the duel, Victor won the right to open a mystery envelope. It was revealed before the nominations that he gained a power to determine the nominees of the week. He chose Flávia and Manoella for eviction.
- ^Note 13: After Dan was nominated by the house vote, Ísis was saved first by a random draw. Then, Ísis saved Victor, who saved Thyago, who saved Angelis, so Manoella became the second nominee.
- ^Note 14: On day 81, the final five competed in a nomination challenge. Victor finished in first place and won a car, while Angelis became the first nominee after came in last. The second nominee will be decided by the house vote.
- ^Note 15: On day 89, the final four competed in the final immunity challenge for place in the final. Thyago was the winner and became the first finalist of the season, so Angelis, Ísis and Victor were automatically nominated for eviction by default.

== Ratings and reception ==
=== Brazilian ratings ===
All numbers are in points and provided by IBOPE.

First air date	MON	TUE	WED	THU	FRI	SAT	Weekly average
10/31 to 11/03/2012	—	—	14	7	8	8	9
11/05 to 11/10/2012	8	7	5	7	7	9	7
11/12 to 11/17/2012	6	8	6	6	7	7	7
11/19 to 11/24/2012	6	8	6	7	7	9	7
11/26 to 12/01/2012	5	8	9	7	7	9	7
12/03 to 12/08/2012	8	7	8	7	7	7	7
12/10 to 12/15/2012	7	7	5	7	6	7	7
12/17 to 12/22/2012	6	10	5	5	6	8	7
12/24 to 12/29/2012	2	7	7	6	8	9	7
12/31 to 01/05/2013	2	4	5	6	6	7	5
01/07 to 01/12/2013	6	5	5	6	6	8	6
01/14 to 01/19/2013	4	5	7	7	8	7	6
01/21 to 01/26/2013	7	7	6	7	7	7	7
01/28 to 01/30/2013	7	7	10	—	—	—	8
10/31 to 01/30/2013	Season Average						7

- Each point represents 60.000 households in São Paulo.

Notes

- Episodes 47 and 53 aired during Christmas Eve (Monday, December 24) and New Year's Eve (Monday, December 31) respectively, and scored an all-time low number of viewers for A Fazenda series.
