= Marco Soares =

Marco Soares may refer to:

- Marco Soares (footballer) (born 1984), Cape Verdean footballer
- Marco Soares (volleyball) (born 1971), Portuguese volleyball player

== See also ==
- Marco Soares (disambiguation)
