= Mulheres Ricas =

Television series

- Genre: Reality television
- Starring: Narcisa Tamborindeguy; Val Marchiori; Lydia Sayeg; Débora Rodrigues; Brunete Fraccaroli; Aeileen Varejão; Andréa de Nóbrega; Mariana Mesquita; Cozete Gomes
- Country of origin: Brazil
- Original language: Portuguese
- No. of seasons: 2
- No. of episodes: 20

Production
- Executive producer: Diego Barredo
- Production locations: São Paulo, Brazil
- Running time: 90 minutes
- Production company: Eyeworks

Original release
- Network: Band
- Release: 2 January 2012 – 11 March 2013

Mulheres Ricas (Portuguese for Rich Women) is a Brazilian reality television show that aired on the Band television network. It premiered on 2 January 2012 and ran for two seasons until its cancellation in 2013.

== Cast ==
Cast members from Mulheres Ricas
Cast members	Seasons	
Cast members	1	2
Narcisa Tamborindeguy	Main	Main
Val Marchiori	Main	Main
Lydia Sayeg	Main	Recurring
Débora Rodrigues	Main	
Brunete Fraccaroli	Main	Recurring
Aeileen Varejão		Main
Andréa de Nóbrega		Main
Mariana Mesquita		Main
Cozete Gomes		Main
Regina Mansur		Recurring

== Episodes ==
Season	Episodes	Originally released	
Season	Episodes	First released	Last released
1	10	January 2, 2012	March 5, 2012
2	10	January 7, 2013	March 11, 2013

=== Season 1 (2012) ===
No. overall	No. in season	Title	Original release date
1	1	"Episode 1"	January 2, 2012
2	2	"Episode 2"	January 9, 2012
3	3	"Episode 3"	January 16, 2012
4	4	"Episode 4"	January 23, 2012
5	5	"Episode 5"	January 30, 2012
6	6	"Episode 6"	February 6, 2012
7	7	"Episode 7"	February 13, 2012
8	8	"Episode 8"	February 20, 2012
9	9	"Episode 9"	February 27, 2012
10	10	"Episode 10"	March 5, 2012

=== Season 2 (2013) ===
No. overall	No. in season	Title	Original release date	Viewer points
11	1	"Episode 1"	January 7, 2013	4
Andrea and Cozete go to a Fábio Jr. concert, while Aeileen spend her money on country boots and Mariana throws an eletro party at her beach house in Maresias. The four new ladies meet for the first time for tea at Ipiranga Palace, where Narcisa arrives by helicopter to meet her new friends.
12	2	"Episode 2"	January 14, 2013	4
Cozete does a photoshoot with her body paint, while Mariana gets frustrated when her husband Luizão doesn't show up for a romantic dinner. The four ladies fly to Rio to attend Narcisa's birthday party, where Aeileen's poket show ends with criticism and tears. Andrea accompanies her daughter on a fashion show. Val returns.
13	3	"Episode 3"	January 21, 2013	4
Narcisa hang gliding over Rio. Cozete becomes Aeileen's agent and schedule an audition for her with musical producer Rick Bonadio. Regina joins the cast and throws a sophisticated party at her mansion. At the party, Mariana confronts Aeileen about a statement she made about her in a magazine, while Cozete and Val exchange barbs about each other's looks. Aeileen and Cozete travel to Lisbon.
14	4	"Episode 4"	January 28, 2013	4
Val and her friends go to nightclub. Narcisa have fun in paradise island Angra dos Reis, Rio. Fluminense player Deco helps Mariana throws a surprise birthday party for Luizão, where Andrea is courted by former Corinthians player Vampeta. Cozete and Aeileen enjoy the beautiful scenery of the region of Alto Douro, Portugal.
15	5	"Episode 5"	February 4, 2013	5
Narcisa meets famous sweeper Renato Sorriso, as they did an interview for a magazine. All the ladies (minus Aeileen and Narcisa) spend the day at a spa, where Val gets emotional when comes to talk about her brother's betrayal during the Truth or Dare game. Aeileen is criticized for being overweight by Rick Bonadio's assistant. Cozete travels to Paris, France.
16	6	"Episode 6"	February 11, 2013	4
Val invites Aeileen for a day at a spa and shopping. Narcisa buys a birthday present for Cozete. All the ladies (minus Regina and Val) attends Cozete's birthday party, where Narcisa steals the show. The next day, Cozete prepares to samba school Tom Maior's carnaval parade. TV host Palmirinha Onofre teaches Andrea how to cook.
17	7	"Episode 7"	February 18, 2013	3
Val invites Mariana to spend a day in Angra. Then, Mariana asks Val's permission to invite Cozete to join them. Aeileen reunites with Rick to show her improvement. Cozete and Val exchange barbs throughout the whole tour and their argument ends up getting serious. Mariana does a photo shoot for her book as an actress. Cozete travels to Gramado to choose a new furniture for her home.
18	8	"Episode 8"	February 25, 2013	5
Mariana and Luizão attend the soccer's tournament semifinal game that their son Rocco is playing. During Aeileen's choreography rehearsal, Cozete reveals to her that she will serve as an open act for a Leonardo's concert. Andrea throws a controversial and failed arabic-themed birthday party. Mariana auditions for a Delphis Fonseca's play behinds Luizão's back.
19	9	"Episode 9"	March 4, 2013	TBA
20	10	"Episode 10"	March 11, 2013	TBA

* Each point represents 60.000 households in São Paulo. All numbers are provided by IBOPE.
