= Balacobaco (TV series) =

- Genre: Comedy
- Created by: Giselle Joras
- Directed by: Leonardo Miranda; Edson Spinello
- Opening theme: "No Balacobaco" by Brasil Company
- Country of origin: Brazil
- Original language: Portuguese
- No. of episodes: 163

Production
- Camera setup: Multi-camera
- Running time: 45 minutes

Original release
- Network: Rede Record
- Release: October 4, 2012 – May 20, 2013

Balacobaco (Literally English: Mess, International title: Tricky Business or Los Tramposos for Spanish markets) is a Brazilian primetime telenovela created, developed and written by Giselle Joras and directed by Leonardo Miranda and Edson Spinello.

The series premiered on Thursday, October 4, 2012 at 10:15 p.m. (BRT/AMT) on Rede Record, replacing Máscaras, and ended on Monday, May 20, 2013, being replaced by Dona Xepa.

Juliana Silveira and Victor Pecoraro stars the protagonists, while Bruno Ferrari and Bárbara Borges star as the main antagonists.

== Plot ==
Isabel Vilela (Juliana Silveira) is about to fulfill one of her greatest wishes. She's been married for a year with the cheerful Danilo (Roger Gobeth) when she realizes that she's pregnant on the eve of a romantic trip. Isabel's professional life is also booming, with financial help from Danilo, she's about to inaugurate her own architecture firm.

However, all of her dreams vanish when she discovers the truth about her husband: Danilo is a young man who has a gambling addiction and is drowning in debt. Reason for which they have to sell the apartment that they live in, dissolve the architecture firm and cancel the trip they have planned. When thieves threaten Danilo, Isabel sees a side of Danilo that she didn't know. This causes her to lose her baby and with it, puts an end to their relationship.

Eduardo (Victor Pecorato) is a senior partner at Radical Adventure, an ecological tourism agency who is finally breaking even from the initial investment. Part of the company's funding comes from an inheritance that his father left him.

Norberto (Bruno Ferrari), Eduardo's hypocritical partner at Radical Adventure resents the fact that he is a minor partner in the company. His desire is to sell the agency and invest in his personal projects, which are without merit. To top it off, he is madly in love with Eduardo's girlfriend, Fabiana (Alice Assef). Eduardo's successes provoke Norberto's envy, which is now focused on bringing his rival down. At the same time, Eduardo doesn't seem to notice Norberto's ruses against him.

== Cast ==
| Actor | Character |
|---|---|
| Juliana Silveira | Isabel Vilela |
| Bárbara Borges | Diva Paranhos |
| Roberta Gualda | Dóris Paranhos |
| Roger Gobeth | Danilo Godoy |
| Bruno Ferrari | Norberto Botelho |
| Victor Pecoraro | Eduardo Corrêa Júnior |
| Solange Couto | Cremilda Paranhos |
| Juliana Baroni | Teresa Vilela Brandão |
| Victor Fasano | Nestor Brandão |
| Thaís Pacholek | Mirela Jordão |
| Julianne Trevisol | Betina Pontes |
| Simone Spoladore | Violeta Osório |
| Rodrigo Phavanello | Plínio Policarpo |
| Antônia Fontenelle | Marlene Leite Aragão |
| André Mattos | Antônio Osório |
| Thierry Figueira | Patrick Pimenta |
| Léo Rosa | Breno Pedrosa |
| Wagner Santisteban | Lucas Sampaio Botelho |
| Sílvio Guindane | Zé Maria Nunes |
| Lu Grimaldi | Lígia Sampaio Botelho |
| Luiz Guilherme | Arthur Botelho |
| Alice Assef | Fabiana Travassos |
| Sylvia Bandeira | Abigail Teixeira Vilela |
| Umberto Magnani | Genivaldo Aragão |
| Paulo Figueiredo | Adamastor Moura |
| Gabriela Moreyra | Joana Veloso |
| Letícia Medina | Taís Vilela Brandão |
| Vitor Facchinetti | Rafael Fortunato Corrêa |
| Mariah Rocha | Luíza Leite Oliveira |
| Rafael Calomeni | Vicente Corrêa |
| Ingra Liberato | Celina Fortunato Corrêa |
| Joana Balaguer | Catarina Fortunato |
| Stella Freitas | Hilda Batista |
| Cristina Pereira | Josefina Barros |
| Rômulo Estrela | André Aragão |
| André Segatti | Magno |
| Nill Marcondes | Darley |
| Rafael Zulu | Mauro Barreto |
| Júlia Fajardo | Adriana Padilha |
| Leandro Léo | Ivaldo Batista |
| João Camargo | Duílio Osório |
| Daniel Aguiar | Jaime Lemos |
| Giullia Buscacio | Vitória Travassos Porto |
| Gonçalo Diniz | João Paulo Antunes |
| Roberta Almeida | Norma Dias |
| Ciça Banal | Gabriela Fortunato Corrêa |
| Bia Abreu | Laura Moura |
| Malu Pizzatto | Mariana |

== Ratings ==
| Timeslot (BRT/AMT) | Episodes | First aired | | Last aired | |
| Timeslot (BRT/AMT) | Episodes | Date | Viewers (in points) | Date | Viewers (in points) |
|---|---|---|---|---|---|
| Mon–Fri 10:15pm | 163 | October 4, 2012 | 8 | May 20, 2013 | 8 |
