= RedeTV! News =

- Genre: News
- Directed by: Stephanie Freitas
- Presented by: Amanda Klein
- Starring: Felipe Jardini; Igor Silveira; Marcelo do Ó
- Country of origin: Brazil
- Original language: Portuguese

Original release
- Network: RedeTV!
- Release: August 22, 2005 – present

Related
- Jornal da Manchete (1983–1999); Jornal da TV! (1999–2005)

RedeTV! News is the main newscast of RedeTV! anchored by Amanda Klein. It focuses on major events in Brazil and the world.

The superintendent of journalism is the journalist Stephanie Freitas.

== Correspondents ==
- Alisson Negrini (Lisboa)
- Fábio Borges (Los Angeles)
- Patrícia Pinheiro (Paris)
- Renato Senise (Londres)
