= Rede Internacional de Televisão =

RIT
- Type: Free-to-air television network
- Country: Brazil
- Stations: RIT MS; RIT São Luís; TV Boa Ventura; TV Farol; TV Nova Conexão
- Headquarters: São Paulo

Programming
- Language: Portuguese
- Picture format: HDTV 1080i

Ownership
- Owner: Igreja Internacional da Graça de Deus

History
- Launched: August 13, 1999

Links
- Website: www.rittv.com.br

Availability

Terrestrial
- Digital terrestrial television: 15 UHF (Pato Branco); 21 UHF (São Luis); 41 UHF (Dourados); 49 UHF (Rio de Janeiro)

Rede Internacional de Televisão (International Television Network, in English), better known as RIT is a Brazilian religious television network, owned by Igreja Internacional da Graça de Deus, led by the missionary R. R. Soares. The programming of this channel is produced for all ages, and almost all of its programming is self-produced. The TV content is interdenominational, meaning that it is produced for the Protestant public in general. Their programs are varied, with children's shows, religious shows, some music shows and journalism.

In Brazil, RIT owns eight owned-and-operated stations, has more than 170 affiliates and more than 120 million viewers in all Brazilian states. RIT is transmitted in Brazil through systems such as UHF, VHF, cable and satellite.

== History ==
RIT was founded in August 1999. The project was a television channel with quality, but, there were difficulties to do it. The channel succeeded. Time to time, RIT started news and entertainment shows such as "Movimento Jovem", "Consulta ao Doutor", "Zig Zag Show", and others.
