= Na Moral =

- Genre: Talk show
- Directed by: Luiz Gleiser
- Presented by: Pedro Bial
- Opening theme: Na Moral, Jota Quest
- Country of origin: Brazil
- Original language: Portuguese

Production
- Running time: 30 minutes

Original release
- Network: Rede Globo
- Release: July 5, 2012 – present

Na Moral (Portuguese for In Moral) is a Brazilian talk show broadcast by Rede Globo since July 5, 2012 and hosted by Pedro Bial. The show includes the participation of three people which complement the theme, 50 people in an audience and a DJ.
