= Faith Show =

- Presented by: Romildo Ribeiro Soares
- Country of origin: Brazil
- No. of seasons: 22

Production
- Running time: Brazil (60 minutes; Monday, Tuesday, Thursday, Friday and Saturday) and 30 minutes (Wednesday); United States (30 minutes; Monday, Tuesday, Wednesday, Thursday and Friday); Germany (Monday, Tuesday, Wednesday, Thursday and Friday)

Original release
- Network: Rede Bandeirantes, Rede TV! CNT and RIT (Brazil); Zee TV and Subhavarta Telugu TV (U.S.); Rheinmaintv (Germany)
- Release: April 3, 2003 – present

The Faith Show (Portuguese: Show da Fé) is a Brazilian television program presented by Romildo Ribeiro Soares, of the International Church of God's Grace. The journalist Graziela Guerra is the executive producer. The show has aired from Monday to Saturday in the primetime broadcasts of Rede Bandeirantes in Brazil. The show was almost cancelled in 2012, due to reduced ratings.

The program has also been aired by RedeTV!, CNT, and RIT. Other channels, such as IIGD, can only be acquired by the signature of Nossa TV. The channel subscription, Nuestra TV, provides the program dubbed in Spanish.

It is currently the largest program in global extension of Brazilian television, reaching Latin America, Asia, Africa, Middle East, and Europe.

== Theme ==
The Faith Show consists of a presentation of worships recorded at the headquarters of the International Church of God's Grace in São Paulo, Brazil. It is broken up into segments, such as "Real Life Drama", "Missionary R. R. Soares answers" and "Open your Heart". In the end, a prayer of faith is held, in which the missionary, with biblical basis, makes a prayer in Jesus' name.

== Worldwide extension ==
The program reaches across Latin America, Asia, Middle East, and Europe. It is also aired in Angola and India. In the United States, the Faith Show is aired by Zee TV from Monday to Friday at 6:30 am and by Subhavarta Telugu TV from Monday to Wednesday from 09:30 to 10:00 pm. In Germany, the Faith Show is aired by the television channel Rheinmaintv from Monday to Friday at 4:00 pm.

== Segments ==
- Real Life Drama (Portuguese: Novela da Vida Real)
- Missionary R. R. Soares Answers (Portuguese: Missionário Responde)
- Open Your Heart (Portuguese: Abrindo o Coração)

== See also ==
- International Church of God's Grace
