= WPUT (FM) =

- North Salem, New York; United States
- Frequency: 90.1 MHz

Programming
- Format: Jazz; community

Ownership
- Owner: Dennis and Maureen Jackson; (Legacy Foundation, Inc.)

History
- First air date: 2012
- Former call signs: WVWA (2008); WJJZ (2008–2009); WJZZ (2009–2014); WQCD (2014–2015); WPUT-FM (July 1–7, 2015)

Technical information
- Licensing authority: FCC
- Facility ID: 175564
- Class: A
- ERP: 660 watts
- HAAT: −13 meters (−43 ft)
- Transmitter coordinates: 41°23′3.3″N 73°34′33.4″W

Links
- Public license information: Public file; LMS

WPUT (90.1 FM) is a non-commercial educational radio station licensed to serve North Salem, New York, United States. The station is owned by Dennis and Maureen Jackson, through licensee Legacy Foundation, Inc. The station airs a jazz music and community radio format.

== History ==
This station received its original construction permit from the Federal Communications Commission on January 22, 2008. The new station was assigned the call sign WVWA by the FCC on May 29, 2008. While still under construction, the station applied for a new call sign and was assigned WJJZ by the FCC on September 22, 2008. The station was assigned the WJZZ call letters by the FCC on March 31, 2009. The station changed its call sign to WQCD on October 2, 2014, and to WPUT-FM on June 2, 2015; on July 8, 2015, the "-FM" suffix was dropped.
