= R. R. Soares =

Brazilian evangelical

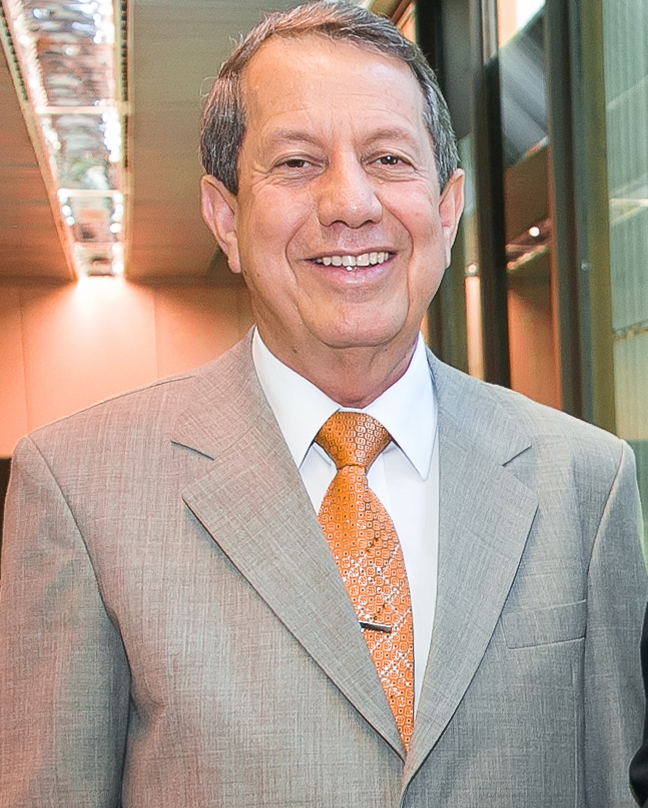
- Soares in 2015
- Born: Romildo Ribeiro Soares; December 6, 1947 (age 78); Muniz Freire, Espírito Santo, Brazil
- Occupations: Televangelist; missionary; theologian; businessman; author; singer; composer

Romildo Ribeiro Soares (born December 6, 1947) is a Brazilian televangelist, missionary, author, singer, businessman, and composer. He became a televangelist and supporter of faith healing in the late 1960s, after reading a book by T. L. Osborn. Related through marriage to another Brazilian preacher, Edir Macedo, he founded the International Church of God's Grace in 1980. This church is among the largest Pentecostal denominations in Brazil. R. R. Soares averages about 100 hours on Brazilian television each week.

== Early life ==
In April 1964 Soares moved to Rio de Janeiro with his family and lived with his uncle Aderbal in São Gonçalo. Soares began his ministry in 1968.

== Ministry ==
Soares had previously been promised a scholarship to study medicine at Patrice Lumumba University in Moscow, but instead founded the International Church of God's Grace (Igreja Internacional da Graça de Deus), opening the first in 1980 in the city of Duque de Caxias, Rio de Janeiro. He remains the church's leader. He is married with Maria Magdalena and is the father of singer David Soares, deputy mayor André Soares, and three other sons.

Soares hosts the program Faith Show (Show da fé) on the networks Rede Bandeirantes and CNT. The show is also broadcast on Rede Internacional de Televisão and Rede TV!. Soares is seen on television around 100 hours per week.

International Church of God's Grace has more than 900 churches throughout Brazil, and in Lisbon, Pompano Beach, Florida, Miami, Orlando, Florida, Brandon, FL, New Jersey, Corona, New York, Somerville, Massachusetts, and Fall River, Massachusetts.

On September 10, 2008, Soares began to send daily messages by e-mail to people registered at ongrace.com. He still continues with this system, with messages translated into English and other languages.

== Business interests ==
Soares is the owner of the Graça Artes Gráficas and Editora Ltda, the gospel record label Graça Music, Grace Editorial (editor), and Graça Filmes (movie distributor). The RIT TV, Nossa Radio, and Nossa TV belong to the International Church of God's Grace.

Soares's net worth was estimated by Forbes at $125m in 2013. His other media interests include radio, publishing and music. He is considered a preacher of the prosperity gospel.

== Books written ==
These books have been translated from Portuguese into English.

- Blessings That Enrich
- Demand Your Rights
- Faith Course
- How to Take Possession of the Blessing
- Seven Virtues of the Conqueror
- Spiritism: The Magic of Illusion
- The Gift That Blesses the Giver
- Three Stages to the Blessing
- Where is God My Maker?
- Your Health Depends on What You Say

== Music CDs produced ==
- Cânticos de Fé
- Acende uma luz
- Grandes Louvores v.1, 2, 3, 4, 5, 6, 7 and 8

== Songs produced and written ==
This list includes CDs with songs written by R. R. Soares.

- "Minhas Canções na voz dos melhores" v.1, 2, 3, and 4
- "Minhas canções na voz do pastor Jayme de Amorim Campos" v.1 and 2
- "Minhas canções na voz de David Soares"
- "Minhas Canções na Voz de André Valadão"
- "Minhas Canções na Voz de Carmem Silva"
- "Minhas canções na voz de Fernandes Lima"
- "Minhas Canções na Voz de David Fantazzini"
