= International Grace of God Church =

Brazilian charismatic evangelical church

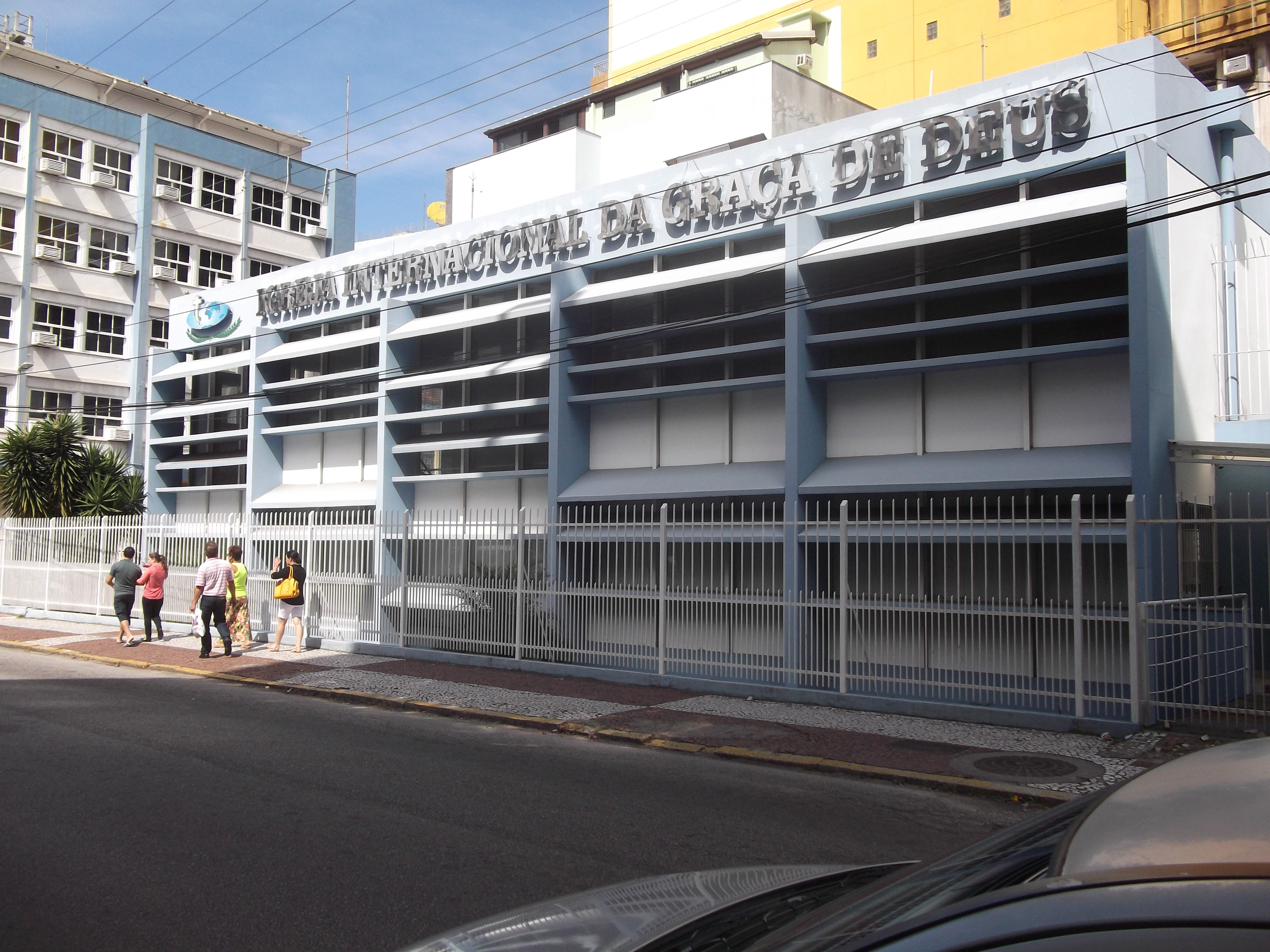
Igreja Internacional da Graça de Deus in Florianópolis

The International Grace of God Church (Portuguese: Igreja Internacional da Graça de Deus) is a Brazilian charismatic evangelical church.

== History ==
Romildo Ribeiro Soares had worked with bishop Edir Macedo of the Universal Church of the Kingdom of God, but they broke off relations in 1978, after disagreements in theology. In 1980, Soares founded the International Grace of God Church, at Rua Lauro Neiva in the city of Rio de Janeiro.

The Church's first temple opened in the city of Duque de Caxias, Rio de Janeiro, followed by others throughout Brazil and in other countries.

The International Church of God's Grace is accepted and recognized as a "Legitimate Christian Fellowship Church" by other denominations and their respective ministers.

== Network ==
As of 2015 there are more than 2,000 International Grace of God churches throughout Brazil, from the north to the south, and churches in Lisbon, Portugal; Durban, South Africa; Pompano Beach, Florida; Miami, Florida; Orlando, Florida; New Jersey; Corona, New York; Somerville, Massachusetts; and Fall River, Massachusetts in the United States.

== Media ==
In 1999, the International Grace of God Church founded a network of television stations called RIT (International Network Television) in major cities in Brazil. They display a daily program on a prime-time network, Bandeirantes, and at night show Faith Show, with Soares as preacher.

As of 2015 the church had a television program called "Faith Show", broadcast during primetime on Rede Bandeirantes and in the mornings and afternoons on Rede TV.

There is daily worship at the international headquarters of the International Grace of God Church in São Paulo, with services performed by Soares.

== Beliefs ==
The denomination has a charismatic confession of faith.
