= Juliana Lohmann =

Brazilian actress (born 1989)

- Born: Juliana Ragghianti Lohmann Cardoso; September 1, 1989 (age 35); Niterói, Rio de Janeiro, Brazil
- Occupation: Actress

Juliana Ragghianti Lohmann Cardoso (born September 1, 1989, in Niterói, Rio de Janeiro) is a Brazilian actress.

== Biography ==
Juliana was discovered in 1998 while watching the World Cup games through a screen on the beach in Icaraí in Niterói. A headhunter invited her to a test model. Three years later she joined Globo as an actress on the show Malhação. Her character was Gabriela Ferreira, Girl Genius and the youngest of the family, remained in the teen series until 2002.

In 2002 participated in the soap opera O Beijo do Vampiro as Pandora, which formed a triangle with the characters of Kayky Brito and Cecília Dassi.

In 2004 after participating in a series Um Só Coração, Juliana returned to soap operas such as Teca, of Começar de Novo, once again playing the girlfriend of the character Kayky Brito. You could say that Juliana consolidated her acting career in this soap opera, because it had an important character from beginning to end of story.

In 2006, after appearances on programs from the Globo, he left home to join the TV Record telenovela through Vidas Opostas in the role of Carla Rocha, daughter played by Luciano Szafir and Babi Xavier.

In 2007 Juliana paraded at Fashion Rio also took part in the new season of Mandrake Channel HBO, playing the character Alice. For a minor to perform recording, Lohmann needed a special permit from the Juvenile Court and a guarantee of a psychologist, because the paper was a teenage prostitute. In the same year, the actress made a test Paparazzo sensual to the site, after completing 18 years, the pictures were inspired by the book Lolita, by Vladimir Nabokov.

In December 2009 Juliana and two friends and colleagues (Lara Gay and Michelly Barros), launched a book called Ela a Outra e Eu, consisting of poems which were united in one book in which the protagonists seem one; three distinct personalities joined by passions. The theater, literature, for life. The book expressing this sensitive unit cemented by the poetry was released by the publisher iVentura.

== Filmography ==
=== Television ===
Year	Title	Role	Notes
2001	Malhação	Gabriela Ferreira (Gabi)	Season 8
2002	O Beijo do Vampiro	Pandora D'Montmatre	
2004	Um Só Coração	Antônia	
2004	Começar de Novo	Teca (Teresa Cristina)	
2005	Malhação	Ciça	Season 12; special participation
2006	A Diarista	Nara	Episode: "Aquele da Chuva"
2006	Vidas Opostas	Carla Rocha	
2007	Mandrake	Alice	Episode: "João Santos"
2008	Chamas da Vida	Manu (Manuela Castelli)	
2011	Sansão e Dalila	Judi	
2011	Malhação	Débora Guimarães de Oliveira	
2013	A Grande Família	Leandra (young)	Episode: "Bebel e Sua Moto"
2013	Joia Rara	Belmira	
2015	As Canalhas	Karen	Episode: "Karen"
2015	I Love Paraisópolis	Neide (Neidinha)	
2016	E Aí... Comeu?	Paola	Episode: "August 29, 2016"

=== Film ===
Year	Title	Role
2011	Malu de Bicicleta	Monique
2011	Teus Olhos Meus	Carla
2013	Faroeste Caboclo	Cris
2017	Motorrad	Bia

=== Theater ===
Year	Title	Role
2005	Courtship	Simone
