= Me Chama de Bruna =

Brazilian television series

- Genre: Drama
- Based on: Bruna Surfistinha
- Starring: Maria Bopp; Carla Rivas; Suzana Kruger; Jonathan Haagensen; Stella Rabello; Luciana Paes; Nash Laila; Maitê Proença; Debora Ozório
- Opening theme: "Dei Um Beijo Na Boca Do Medo" (Férias em Videotape)
- Composer: Simone Mazzer
- Country of origin: Brazil
- Original language: Portuguese
- No. of seasons: 4
- No. of episodes: 32

Production
- Executive producer: Leo Ribeiro
- Production location: São Paulo
- Cinematography: Julio Costantini
- Running time: 45 minutes
- Production companies: TV Zero; Fox Networks Group

Original release
- Network: Fox Premium
- Release: October 8, 2016 – January 31, 2020

Related
- Confessions of a Brazilian Call Girl

Me Chama de Bruna (transl. Call me Bruna) is a Brazilian drama television series loosely based on the real story of Bruna Surfistinha (pen name of Raquel Pacheco), a former sex worker who attracted the attention of Brazilian media by publishing, in a blog, her sexual experiences with clients. The series premiered on Fox Premium on October 8, 2016.

== Premise ==
Before becoming the most famous prostitute in Brazil, Raquel was just a middle-class 17-year-old teen girl with a dream of freedom; but as she leaves her parents house and adopting the pen name of Bruna Surfistinha, she will go through a dangerous underworld of sex, drugs and violence: the pains of growth will create deep marks in her personality.

== Cast ==
- Maria Bopp as Raquel / Bruna
- Carla Rivas as Stella
- Suzana Kruger as Nancy
- Jonathan Haagensen as Zé Ricardo
- Stella Rabello as Georgette
- Luciana Paes as Mónica
- Nash Laila as Jessica
- Maitê Proença as Miranda
- Debora Ozório as Alice

== Episodes ==
Each episode lasts approximately 45 minutes. The television series consists of four seasons:

- Season 1 (8 episodes) - from October 9, 2016, to November 27, 2016
- Season 2 (8 episodes) - from October 22, 2017, to December 10, 2017
- Season 3 (8 episodes) - from December 7, 2018, to January 25, 2019
- Season 4 (8 episodes) - from December 13, 2019, to January 31, 2020
