= Drica Moraes =

Brazilian actress (born 1969)

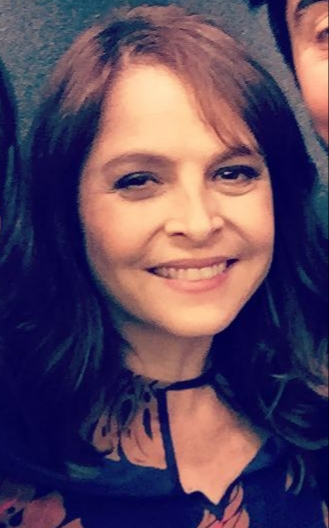
- Moraes in 2018
- Born: Adriana Moraes Rêgo Reis; 29 July 1969 (age 56); Rio de Janeiro, Brazil
- Occupation: Actress
- Years active: 1983–present
- Children: 1

Adriana Moraes Rego Reis (Portuguese: [ˈdɾikɐ moˈɾajks]; born 29 July 1969) is a Brazilian actress.

== Professional life ==
Drica Moraes started doing theater in Andrews College, Zona Sul of Rio de Janeiro with Miguel Falabella. She also studied in Tablado, at the age of 13, and started her first experiences as an actress in theater for children, in Labours of Hercules, adaptation of the book by Monteiro Lobato in 1983. She also took part of the plays Our Town, 1984, and Little Red Riding Hood, written and directed by Maria Clara Machado, in 1985.

Moraes debuted professionally with the show The Secret of Cocachim, as Denise Crispum, in 1989, which earned her the Coca-Cola Award. In television, her first appearance could not have been more discreet. Her debut work took place in Rede Globo in 1986, in the episode O Sequestro de Lauro Corona, in the extinct Teletema, written by Ricardo Linhares. Although she was small, the role played by the actress drew the attention of director Roberto Talma, responsible for the show, which invited her to his first telenovela, Top Model, three years later, where she played the maid Cida.

While working for the author Walcyr Carrasco, she played Machiavellian villains and comic girls. In 1996, she made a special appearance in the drama of Rede Manchete, whereas joining the cast of the novel Xica da Silva, as the terrible and evil Violante, which earned her the APCA award for Best Actress of the year. Four years later, in Rede Globo, she portrayed the selfish Marcela in the telenovela O Cravo e a Rosa. In 2002, she was part of the telenovela Desejos de Mulher. She was also the co-star character as the manicure Márcia in Chocolate com Pimenta. She had also portrayed Olívia in Alma Gêmea.

Prior to becoming an actress, Drica considered to be a designer and participated in the making of a poetry book, creating visual images to illustrate the work. In July 2010, she debuted on the national movie circuit in O Bem Amado, in which she was one of Sisters Cajazeiras. Months later, in January 2011, the film was aired by Rede Globo as a series divided into four chapters.

In 2010, the actress had acute myeloid leukemia and underwent a bone marrow treatment. She acted in Ti Ti Ti as the physical therapist Teresa Batalha, in a cameo role character in the last chapters of the plot. In the same year she had a special appearance in an episode of A Grande Família.

In 2012, she was in the miniseries Dercy de Verdade, playing Clô Prado. In the same year, she returned into telenovelas in the remake of Guerra dos Sexos.

In 2014, enters the cast of Doce de Mãe, playing Rosalinda. Still in 2014, Moraes, played the great villain Cora, in Império, being praised for its interpretation. The actress had to leave the soap opera for health problems, being replaced by Marjorie Estiano, who played the same character in the first phase of the plot. In 2015, was confirmed like protagonist of Verdades Secretas, novel of the 23h, written by Walcyr Carrasco, replacing Deborah Secco.

In 2016, she was in the Justice miniseries, where she played Vânia Ferraz, an unbalanced and emotionally fragile woman, acting with Antônio Calloni and Cauã Reymond. Drica was praised by web surfers.b In 2017 is escalated like protagonist next to Fábio Assunção of the miniseries A Fórmula. The miniseries had negative repercussion, and low hearing, being discarded a second season.

== Personal life ==
In 1994, when recording a show on TV, Drica met director Régis Faria. In the same year they married. In 1998, Drica discovered to be pregnant, for her happiness, but in a few months suffered a miscarriage, getting severely depressed and not wanting to get pregnant again. In 2003, the couple was not getting along, and decided to divorce.

In 2003, Drica met and married the cultural producer Raul Schmidt. In 2009, Drica became a mother, which was her greatest dream: Why not want to get pregnant again for fear of having another miscarriage, she adopted a baby 1 month old, whom she named Mateus. She says she does not want the child to hide the fact that he intends to foster and adopt another baby after Mateus is greater. In 2008, for marital disagreements, Drica and Raul divorced. In early 2009, she began a new relationship with the homeopathic physician Fernando Pitanga.

=== Health ===
In February 2010, after doing many tests, and over one year feeling very bad, with fainting and body aches, Moraes was admitted to the Samaritan Hospital to see what had, until there was a diagnosis of acute myeloid leukemia. Drica began to start chemotherapy. His friends and relatives mobilized a major campaign for blood donation. In July 2010, underwent a bone marrow transplant. Once retrieved, Drica gave an interview on Fantástico. During the interview, she said, "Your life will improve a lot if you do not die." She will make intensive care for another year and will be followed for life, to prevent the disease returning.

In 2014, Drica was removed from the Império novel for a week. She was diagnosed with pharyngitis and was later permanently removed from the Império, where her character is one of the most prominent in the plot, for being a villain. At the time, it was considered among the public that the cancer would have returned, which was denied by the own actress and team of the novel. Pharyngitis, caused by the fragility of her health and being overworked, hurt her voice and made her hoarse, and she could not act in those conditions. According to the author of the novel, Aguinaldo Silva, reveals that he had to catch light with Drica Moraes since the beginning of the novel of the nine of the Globo, in July. The actress maintains special health care because of a cancer she faced in 2010. "Every time I wrote a strong scene I could not help but think that I was doing an enormous harm to Drica's health." Then Aguinaldo Silva again called Marjorie Estiano to replace Drica Moraes, the actress had played the younger Cora in the first phase.

== Filmography ==
=== Television ===
Year	Title	Role	Notes
1986	Teletema		Episode: "O Sequestro de Lauro Corona"
1988	Grupo Escolacho		Special
1989	Top Model	Maria Aparecida (Cida)	
1990	Lua Cheia de Amor	Isabela Souto Maia	
1994	Confissões de Adolescente	Patrícia	Episodes: "Barbara Vai a Luta" / A Lei de Paulo
1994	Quatro por Quatro	Denise	
1996	Xica da Silva	Violante Cabral	
1997	A Comédia da Vida Privada	Cláudia	Episode: "A Voz do Coração"
1998	Era uma Vez...	Madalena Giunquetti	
1999	Você Decide		Episode: "Faça a Coisa Certa"
1999	Mulher	Zilda	Episode: "Maternidade, Mães de Família"
2000	Você Decide	Laurinda	Episode: "Ídolos de Barro"
2000	Garotas do Programa	Various characters	
2000	O Cravo e a Rosa	Marcela de Almeida Leal (Muriel)	
2001	Brava Gente	Catiti	Episode: "Lira Paulistana"
2001	Os Normais	Bete	Episode: "Todos São Normais"
2001	Retrato Falado	Sirleide Lima	Episode: "Joserlane"
2002	Desejos de Mulher	Gilda	
2002	A Grande Família	Sheila	Episode: "Nenê, Esposa Carinhosa"; Episode: "A Mulher Que Botou Chifre"
2002	Os Normais	Rô	Episode: "Tudo Normal Até Que..."
2003	Os Normais	Rejane	Episode: "Nosso Já Famoso Episódio Infame"
2003	Chocolate com Pimenta	Márcia Mariano da Silva	
2004	Os Aspones	Moira	
2005	Alma Gêmea	Olívia Médici	
2006	Pé na Jaca	Pietra	Episodes: ""November 20–December 18, 2006"
2008	Queridos Amigos	Vânia	
2009	Decamerão - A Comédia do Sexo	Tessa	
2009	Norma	Regiane	Episode: "October 11, 2009"
2011	O Bem Amado	Judicéia Cajazeira	
2011	Ti Ti Ti	Teresa Batalha	Special participation
2011	A Grande Família	Margareth	Episode: "Aqui se faz, aqui se paga"
2012	Dercy de Verdade	Clô Prado	
2012	A Grande Família	Silvia	Episode: "A Rosa Púrpura do Bairro"
2012	Guerra dos Sexos	Antonieta Carneiro (Nieta)	
2014	Doce de Mãe	Rosalinda	
2014	Império	Cora dos Anjos	
2015	Verdades Secretas	Carolina Brito	
2016	Justiça	Vânia Ferraz	
2017	Valentins	Dra. Patricia	Special participation
2017	A Fórmula	Angélica	
2018	Mister Brau	Matilde	Episode: "O Musical"
2019–present	Sob Pressão	Dr. Vera Lúcia Veiga	
2020	Amor e Sorte	Fernanda	Episode: "Linha de Raciocínio"; Episode: "A Beleza Salvará"
2022	Travessia	Núbia Fernandes	
2024	Volta por Cima	Joyce Góis de Macedo	

=== Films ===
Year	Title	Role	Notes
1990	Vaidade		Short film
1992	Manôushe		
1995	O Mandarim		
1995	As Meninas	Lia	
1998	Traição	Wife	
2000	Bossa Nova	Nadine	
2001	Amores Possíveis	Carol	
2004	Onde Anda Você	Paloma	
2009	Os Normais 2	Silvinha	
2010	O Bem Amado	Judicéia Cajazeira	
2011	Bruna Surfistinha	Larissa	
2014	Getúlio	Alzira Vargas	

=== Theater ===
Year	Title
1983	Os Doze Trabalhos de Hércules
1984	Nossa Cidade
1985	Chapeuzinho Vermelho
1989	O Segredo de Cocachim
1990	A Bao A Qu
1992	A Morta
1993	Só Eles o Sabem
1993	Pianíssimo
1993	Pixinguinha
1999	O Crime de Dr. Alvarenga
1999	Melodrama
2000	O Rei da Vela
2001	Vítor ou Vitória
2002	Mamãe Não Pode Saber
2004	Noticias Cariocas
2008	A Ordem do Mundo
2012	À Primeira Vista

== Awards and nominations ==
=== Grande Otelo ===
Year	Category	Nominations	Result	Ref
2010	Best Actress in a Supporting Role	Os Normais 2 - A Noite mais Maluca de Todas	Nominated	
2012	Best Actress in a Supporting Role	Confessions of a Brazilian Call Girl	Won	
2015	Best Actress in a Leading Role	Getúlio	Nominated	

=== APCA Awards ===
Year	Category	Nominations	Result	Ref
1996	Best Actress in Television	Xica da Silva	Won	
2014	Best Actress in Television	Império	Nominated	
2015	Best Actress in Television	Verdades Secretas	Nominated	

=== Art Quality Brazil Awards ===
Year	Category	Nominations	Result	Ref
2003	Best Supporting Actress – Television	Chocolate com Pimenta	Nominated	
2004	Best Actress in a TV Series	Os Aspones	Won	
2004	Best Featured Actress in a Play	Noticias Cariocas	Nominated	
2005	Best Supporting Actress – Television	Alma Gêmea	Nominated	
2009	Best Actress in a Minisseries or Telemovie	Decamerão: A Comédia do Sexo	Nominated	
2011	Best Actress in a Minisseries or Telemovie	O Bem Amado	Nominated	

=== Best of the Year – Globe Awards ===
Year	Category	Nominations	Result	Ref
2005	Best Supporting Actress	Alma Gêmea	Nominated	
2014	Best Supporting Actress	Império	Won	
2015	Best Actress	Verdades Secretas	Nominated	

=== Cartagena Film Festival ===
Year	Category	Nominations	Result	Ref
1995	Best Actress	As Meninas	Won	

=== Contigo! Awards ===
Year	Category	Nominations	Result	Ref
2005	Best Supporting Actress – Television	Alma Gêmea	Nominated	
2005	Best Romantic Couple (with Malvino Salvador)	Alma Gêmea	Nominated	
2013	Best Supporting Actress – Television	Guerra dos Sexos	Nominated	
2019	Best Supporting Actress – Television	Sob Pressão	Nominated	

=== Guarani Cinema Awards ===
Year	Category	Nominations	Result	Ref
2001	Best Supporting Actress	Bossa Nova	Nominated	
2012	Best Supporting Actress	Confessions of a Brazilian Call Girl	Nominated	
2015	Best Supporting Actress	Getúlio	Nominated	
2019	Best Supporting Actress	Rasga Coração	Nominated	

=== Mambembe Awards ===
Year	Category	Nominations	Result	Ref
1987	Best Featured Actress in a Play	De Repente, no Recreio	Nominated	
1989	Best Featured Actress in a Play	O Segredo de Cochachim	Won	
1993	Best Featured Actress in a Play	Pianíssimo	Won	

=== Quem Awards ===
Year	Category	Nominations	Result	Ref
2014	Best Supporting Actress	Império	Won	
2015	Best Actress	Verdades Secretas	Nominated	
2016	Best Supporting Actress	Justiça	Nominated	

=== Shell Awards ===
Year	Category	Nominations	Result	Ref
2003	Best Featured Actress in a Play	Mamãe Não Pode Saber	Nominated	
2009	Best Featured Actress in a Play	A Ordem do Mundo	Nominated	
2012	Best Featured Actress in a Play	À Primeira Vista	Nominated	
