= Daniel Dantas (actor) =

Brazilian actor (born 1954)

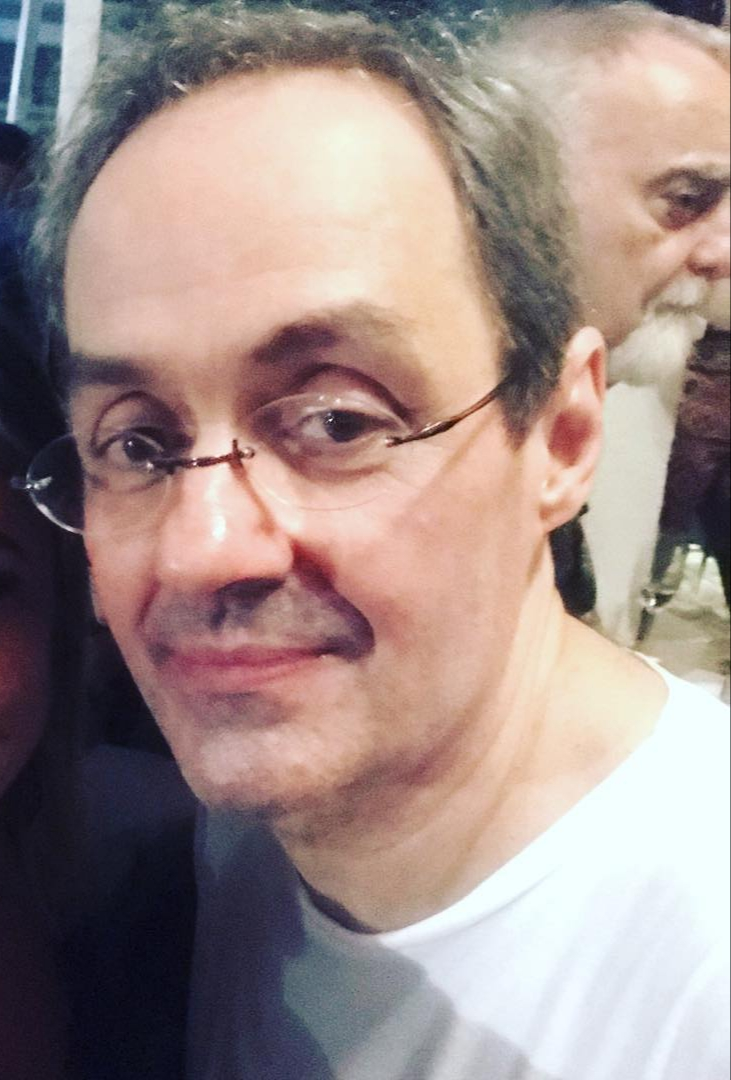
- Dantas in 2020
- Born: Daniel Tunes Dantas; 28 June 1954 (age 71); Rio de Janeiro, Brazil
- Occupation: Actor
- Years active: 1975–present
- Spouse: Zezé Polessa (m. 1979; div. 1988)
- Children: 1
- Father: Nelson Dantas

Daniel Tunes Dantas (Brazilian Portuguese: [dɐniˈɛw ˈdɐ̃tas]; born 28 June 1954) is a Brazilian actor. In 1999, he won the Best Actor award at the Festival de Recife for his role in Traição. He is the son of actor Nelson Dantas.

== Partial filmography ==
- Tudo Bem (1978) as José Roberto's friend
- Chega Mais (1980, TV Series) as Tatá
- Engraçadinha (1981) as Zózimo
- O Sonho Não Acabou (1982) as João Carlos
- Fonte da Saudade (1985)
- Sinhá Moça (1986, TV Series) as Ricardo Fontes
- Sonho de Valsa (1987)
- Brasileiras e Brasileiros (1990-1991, TV Series) as Orlando
- O Dono do Mundo (1991, TV Series) as Júlio
- Mulheres de Areia (1993, TV Series) as Breno Soares de Azevedo
- Quatro por Quatro (1994-1995, TV Series) as Celso
- The Interview (1995) as Editor do Brasilian Tribune
- Explode Coração (1995, TV Series) as Tadeu
- Pequeno Dicionário Amoroso (1997) as Gabriel
- O Homem Nu (1997) as Mendonça
- Anjo Mau (1997-1998, TV Series) as Tadeu Fachini
- Traição (1998) as Geraldo
- Força de um Desejo (1999, TV Series) as Bartolomeu
- Cronicamente Inviável (2000) as Carlos
- Coração Brasileiro (2000) as Jonas
- Sabor da Paixão (2002, TV Series) as Edgar Reis
- Lost Zweig (2002) as Lauro Pontes
- O Vestido (2003) as Fausto
- Celebridade (2003-2004, TV Series) as Ademar Sampaio
- Os Aspones (2004, TV Series)
- Começar de Novo (2004, TV Series) as Wagner
- Mandrake (2005, TV Series) as Baby Machado
- Caixa Dois (2007) as Roberto
- Paraíso Tropical (2007, TV Series) as Heitor
- Forasters (2008) as Alí
- Os Normais 2: A Noite Mais Maluca de Todas (2009) as Iurinei
- Sonhos Roubados (2009) as Tio Peri
- Histórias de Amor Duram Apenas 90 Minutos (2009) as Humberto
- Eu e Meu Guarda-Chuva (2010) as Barão Von Staffen
- Cheias de Charme (2012, TV Series) as Sidney Monteiro
- Sangue Bom (2013, TV Series) as Gilson Rabelo
- Getúlio (2014) as Deputado Afonso Arinos
- Boogie Oogie (2014-2015, TV Series) as Elísio Miranda Romão
- Pequeno Dicionário Amoroso 2 (2015) as Gabriel
- BR 716 (2016) as Felipe's father
- O Amor no Divã (2016) as José
- Novo Mundo (2017, TV Series) as Olinto
- Rúcula com Tomate Seco (2017) as Dr. Marcos Antônio
- Malhação: Vidas Brasileiras (2018-2019, TV Series) as Jairo Kavaco
- Um Lugar ao Sol (2021-2022, TV Series) as Túlio
