= Mário Schoemberger =

Brazilian actor (1952–2008)

- Born: February 5, 1952; Curitiba, Brazil
- Died: May 14, 2008 (aged 56); Curitiba
- Occupation: Actor

Mário Schoemberger (February 5, 1952 - May 14, 2008) was a Brazilian film, television and theater actor.

In his last film role, Schoemberger was personally cast in the 2007 film Drained by its director, Heitor Dhalia. He appeared in the film opposite actor Selton Mello. On television, Schoemberger also appeared in Vidas Opostas as Sérgio Ventura. His other film and television roles included Trair e Coçar É Só Começar, Da Cor do Pecado, Minha Nada Mole Vida and The Aspones.

Mário Schoemberger had been hospitalized in the Nossa Senhora das Graças hospital in Curitiba, Brazil, since December 2007 for treatment of cancer. Several of his friends, including Brazilian comedians Hélio Barbosa, Fábio Silvestre and Diogo Portugal organized a fundraising named Os Amigos do Mário (Mário's Friends) to help to pay for the cost of his medical expenses. Schoemberger died on May 14, 2008, at the age of 56.

== Television roles ==
- 2006 - Vidas Opostas .... Sérgio Ventura
- 2005 - A Grande Família
- 2005 - A Diarista .... Dom Diego
- 2004 - Da Cor do Pecado .... Borja
- 2004 - The Aspones .... Sr. Góes
- 2002 - O Beijo do Vampiro .... Professor Antunes
- 2002 - Desejos de Mulher .... Coelho Leite
- 2000 - Vidas Cruzadas .... Ambrósio
- 1996 - Pista Dupla

== Filmography ==
- 2006 - Drained - Homem do Relógio
- 2006 - Mulheres do Brasil - Rubão
- 2006 - Trair e Coçar É Só Começar - Cristiano
- 2003 - So Normal (Os Normais, o Filme)
- 2002 - Querido Estranho - Carlos Alfredo
