= José Carvalho =

Brazilian screenwriter, script doctor and dramaturgy professor

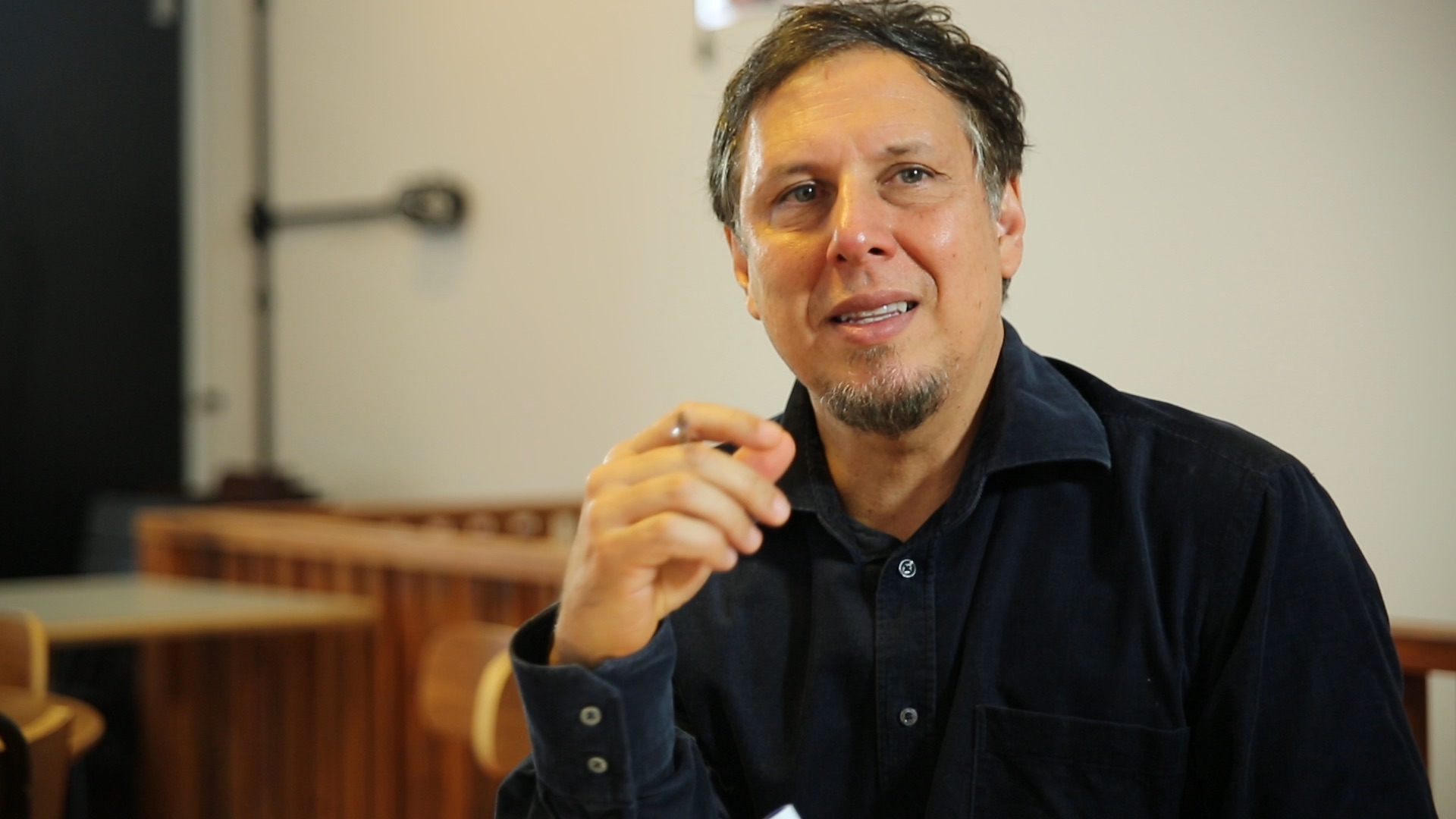
José Carvalho, Brazilian Screenwriter

José Carvalho (born June 11, 1964 in Salvador, Brazil) is a Brazilian screenwriter, script doctor and dramaturgy professor. He has written scripts for the big and small screens since the early 90s. Some of his most well-known works include Castelo Rá-Tim-Bum, Bruna Surfistinha, Faroeste Caboclo and the classic soap opera Xica da Silva. With an MA in Literature from PUC-Rio, Carvalho has taught courses at not only his alma-mater, but also renowned Brazilian production houses such as O2 Filmes (co-owned by Brazilian film director Fernando Meirelles) and Globo.

Carvalho is set to open his own screen/television writing school, Roteiraria, alongside partner Edu Ribeiro in April 2016.

== Feature Length Screenplays ==
Year	Title	Director	Awards	Co-Authors	Starring
1998	O Primeiro Dia	Walter Salles; Daniela Thomas	Winner; Best Original Screenplay — Grande Prêmio do Cinema Brasileiro	João Emanuel Carneiro; Walter Salles; Daniela Thomas	Fernanda Torres; Luiz Carlos Vasconcelos
1999	Castelo Rá-Tim-Bum	Cao Hamburger	Nominated; Best Adapted Screenplay — Grande Prêmio do Cinema Brasileiro	Anna Muylaert	Diego Kozievitch; Rosi Campos; Sérgio Mamberti
2002	Querido Estranho	Ricardo Pinto e Silva	Nominated; Best Adapted Screenplay — Grande Prêmio do Cinema Brasileiro	Ricardo Pinto e Silva; Baseado na peça de Maria Adelaide Amaral	Daniel Filho; Suely Franco
2010	Elvis & Madona	Marcelo Laffitte	Winner; Best Screenplay — Festival do Rio; Nominated; Best Original Screenplay — Grande Prêmio do Cinema Brasileiro	Marcelo Laffitte	Simone Spoladore; Igor Cotrim
2010	Como Esqueçer	Malu de Martino	N/A	Based on novel by Myriam Campello	Ana Paula Arósio
2011	Bruna Surfistinha	Marcus Baldini	Winner; Best Adapted Screenplay — Grande Prêmio do Cinema Brasileiro	Homero Olivetto; Antônia Pellegrino; Based on the biography of Raquel Pacheco	Deborah Secco
2012	Meus Dois Amores	Luiz Henrique Rios	N/A	Adaptation of short story by João Guimarães Rosa	Caio Blat; Maria Flor; Alexandre Borges
2013	Faroeste Caboclo	René Sampaio	Winner; Best Adapted Screenplay — Grande Prêmio do Cinema Brasileiro	Victor Atherino; Marcos Bernstein; Based on a song by Renato Russo	Isis Valverde
2015	A Esperança é a Última que Morre	Calvito Leal	N/A	Patrícia Andrade; Eduardo Caldas	Danton Mello; Dani Calabresa
2015	Beatriz	Alberto Graça	N/A	Marcos Bernstein; Ricardo Bravo; José Pedro Dos Santos; Alberto Graça	Marjorie Estiano; Sérgio Guizé

== Brazilian Television Series ==
Year	Title	Director	Channel
1992	Você Decide	Herval Rossano	TV Globo
1995	Tocaia Grande	Walter Avancini	TV Manchete
1996	Sai de Baixo	Denis Carvalho	TV Globo
1996	Xica da Silva	Walter Avancini	TV Manchete
2003	Carga Pesada	Roberto Naar	TV Globo

== Script Doctoring ==
Year	Title	Director	Type
2009	Cinderelas, Lobos e um Príncipe Encantado	Joelzito Araújo	Feature Length Documentary
2012	A Coleção Invisível	Bernard Attal	Feature Length
2013	Tapas & Beijos	Maurício Farias	TV series produced by TV Globo
2014	Meus Dias de Rock	Bernardo Melo Barreto	TV series for Canal Brasil
2016	O Grande Circo Místico	Carlos Diegues	Feature Length
2016	Malasartes e o Duelo com a Morte	Paulo Morelli	Feature Length
2016	Uma Loucura de Mulher (Depois de Você)	Marcus Ligocki	Feature Length
Pre-production	Marighella	Wagner Moura	Feature Length
Pre-production	A Matriarca	Pedro Morelli	Series Produced by O2 Filmes
Pre-production	As amigas do meu bebê	Luis Pinheiro	Series Produced by O2 Filmes
