= Léo Rosa =

Brazilian actor (1983–2021)

Leonardo Rosa da Silva, best known as Léo Rosa (13 December 1983 – 9 March 2021) was a Brazilian actor. He was most known for his role Miguel Campobello in the telenovela Vidas Opostas. Rosa died on 9 March 2021 from testicular cancer.
