= O Beijo do Vampiro =

Brazilian telenovela

- Created by: Antônio Calmon
- Starring: Flávia Alessandra; Tarcísio Meira; Cláudia Raia; Marco Ricca; Júlia Lemmertz; Alexandre Borges; Deborah Secco; Kayky Brito and big cast
- Opening theme: "Blue Moon" (The Marcels)
- Country of origin: Brazil
- Original language: Portuguese
- No. of episodes: 215

Production
- Running time: 50 min.

Original release
- Network: Rede Globo
- Release: August 26, 2002 – May 3, 2003

O Beijo do Vampiro (A Vampire's Kiss) is a Brazilian telenovela that was produced and aired by Rede Globo from August 26, 2002 to May 3, 2003, totaling 215 chapters, substituting Desejos de Mulher and preceding Kubanacan.

== Plot ==
In the 12th century, the vampire Bóris Vladescu falls in love with Cecília, a beautiful princess betrothed to Count Rogério. Bóris, jealous of their love, fights Rogério in front of the princess in the castle and defenestrates him. Later he kills Cecília's parents and brothers. Depressed after losing her beloved husband and family and forced to marry a vampire, Cecília commits suicide by throwing herself from the same tower where Rogério died.

Almost 800 years later, Bóris has a son with Marie, an English woman who dies in childbirth. In the Maramures city hospital, Bóris to protect his son from his wife Mina d' Montmatre, and hides him by switching him with another baby - the son of Lívia and Bobby, the reincarnations of Cecília and Rogério, respectively. The years pass and his son, Zeca grows up as one of Lívia's children. Her true son, Renato was left in an orphanage and becomes homeless, and also befriends Zeca and his brothers Tetê and Júnior. Zeca lives as an ordinary boy until his vampiric instincts become more evident at the age of 13. Bóris is awakened from his slumber along with Mina, and they need to take Zeca as quickly as possible because Bóris needs an heir, or their family will die and Bóris will be considered responsible. Also, Bobby dies in an airplane crash caused by Bóris.

Other characters that enrich the plot. Augusto, a district attorney, feuds with Armando, because he wants to preserve a historical monument while Armando wants to demolish it to build a shopping center. Augusto also has feelings for Lívia, but she only thinks of him as a friend. Galileo is a clumsy but kind-hearted vampire hunter who belongs to a great line of vampire hunters. His son, Bartô is bitten by Mina's servant Amélie and begins dating her. Galileo falls in love with Zoroastra, Lívia's mother, who is secretly a witch fighting the local vampires. Martha, Augusto's sister-in-law, is blinded by a car accident that killed her sister; she becomes an evil stepmother to Augusto's children. Later, she is bitten by Bóris, mutating into his vampiress bride. The vampiric duo terrorize the city.

Bóris comes to Maramures, under the name Igor Pivomar (his surname Pivomar is an anagram of Vampiro, which is Portuguese for Vampire), a businessman who owns the licensing of everything related to vampires. He possess the body of Rodrigo, a mysterious and lonely man seeking Lívia's attention, initiating a complex battle between Bóris, Rodrigo and Augusto for the love of Lívia. During his stay in Maramures, he mutates a criminal called Godzilla into a vampire and his loyal servant.

In the middle of this conflict, Lara, a sultry and sexy woman who doesn't accept being left over from Rodrigo becomes Lívia's enemy. She is bitten and mutated into a vampiress by Bóris' second in command Victor Victorio, who secretly plots to take over his position in the vampire society. Bóris' son, Zeca becomes a "good vampire" who never attacks people, he falls in love with Augusto's daughter, Liz, and is tempted to bite her and therefore mutate her into a vampiress.

Meanwhile, Lara meets Count Dracula and becomes his concubine, enraging her former lover Victor, who mutated her. Galileo, who was trying to vanquish Victor, infiltrates his domain and stakes Count Dracula, thinking he has destroyed Victor. Lara seduces and bites Armando, who mutates into a vampire.

Rodrigo develops a relationship with Mina, impregnating her with his daughter, who grows quickly to adolescence. She is Pandora, a dhampir, half-human, half-vampire and everybody thinks she is Bóris' daughter, not Rodrigo's. Near the end of the series, a master vampire called Nosferatu, comes to Maramures to destroy Bóris and take his position in the vampire society. The conflict splits the vampire society in half. Martha and Victor betray Bóris and team-up with Nosferatu, while Godzila, Bartô, and Rodrigo choose to remain loyal. Zeca is the only vampire who chooses to protect the humans. In the final battle, Martha and Victor are destroyed by Bóris, but Nosferatu mortally wounds Rodrigo, Godzilla and Bóris. Zeca destroys Nosferatu with help from the angel Ezequiel.

However, Bóris dies in Zeca's arms and his death lifts the curse on the vampires mutated by him. Zeca becomes human again along with Godzilla, Bartô, Lara, and Armando. To save Rodrigo's life, Mina bites him, mutating him into a vampire, and together they take Pandora, Amélie and Petra Van Petra to "live" in Transylvania. After the end, it is revealed that Bóris has survived his death.

== Characters ==
=== Protagonists ===
- Bóris Vladescu

An almost thousand-year-old vampire master and antagonist. He is dark, seductive, elegant and somewhat clumsy at the same time cold, cruel and malevolent. Before the beginning of the series, he fell in love with Princess Cecília but she doesn't recipocrate his feelings for her and in anger, he killed Cecília's husband, Count Rogério but in her sorrow she commits suicide rather than marry a vampire. Her death still haunts him. Several centuries, later he marries several woman in order to create an heir to his legacy since he is already tired of his position. He has a baby son with another vampiress who dies in childbirth, who he hides from his jealous wife Mina d' Montmatre, switches him with another baby and he is raised as the son of Lívia and Bobby.

Bóris is an exceptionally powerful vampire, having been one of the oldest and he claims he cannot even remember how he started. He has superhuman strength, can mesmerize anyone with his eyes, can teleport to great distances, has control over animals, can summon a fiery sword to fight his enemies, can erase people's memories, and has led armies over the centuries. Bóris can shapeshift into a cloud of bats, a giant wolf, and mist. Bóris can control weather and curse other vampires by erasing their fangs, but he is also capable of possessing anyone, however while in somebody else's body, his original body becomes helpless. In the beginning, he was unlikable and harsh, considered the antagonist, but his relationship with the humans and the other characters soften his personality and he becomes more compromising, understandable, and altruistic. He desires Lívia more than anyone and wants to mutate her into his vampiress bride. Bóris bears a strong resemblance to Barnabas Collins from the TV Series Dark Shadows.

- Zeca

Bóris' teenage son and also a vampire. His true name is Attila Vladesco. He is the son of Bóris and the human Marie but she died and in order to protect him from Mina and get close to Lívia, he switched him with Lívia's true son and he was raised as one of her children. When reaching the age of 13, he mutates into one of the undead as the heir of Bóris, however because of his loving personality, he doesn't become evil as his father expected, much to his chagrin and turns into a sort of "good vampire". When learning of each other, Jackie hates Bóris for making him what he is and is distrustful of him because he knows Bóris wants Zeca's adopted mother Lívia, but as the series progressed, Zeca learns to love his father and admire his good personality traits, but still defies him.

Zeca never drinks blood or attacks humans but he has no problem when he uses his vampiric powers to impress anyone. He has super strength, can shapeshift into a bat or a wolf, can control his own shadow, can teleport, has telepathy and knows some few tricks but still his powers are not even a match to his father, but at one point he banished Martha Morta to Hell for a time before she returned a little bit pissed after a few seconds. He is even blessed by the angel Ezekiel, he can withstand sunlight without harm and enter churches or blessed houses. He is perhaps the only vampire who doesn't exhibit the evil behavior of other vampires in the series. Zeca has romantic feelings for a human girl called Liz and is afraid if she finds out about him, when Bóris suggested to mutate her into a vampiress, Zeca becomes disgusted and angry, and refuses to let that happen.

In the final battle, Zeca helps his father who was mortally wounded by Nosferatu, and with the angel Ezekiel's help, they destroy Nosferatu. Zeca takes his father to his crypt, and weeps as he dies in his arms. Zeca tells his father he loved him so much, giving peace to Bóris in his death. Boris told Zeca, with his death, the vampiric power to sustain Zeca would be gone and he would become human. In the end, Zeca resumed his new life with his family to live happily after. His fate is unknown, because it is revealed Bóris survived his death, and it is unknown if Zeca will return to being a vampire.

- Lívia

The main protagonist of the show, she is a woman living in Maramures and the reincarnation of Princess Cecília, the old love of Bóris Vladescu. She has her son Renat, taken away from her without her knowledge and raised Bóris' son, Jackie as one of her own. She becomes a widow when her husband dies, who also was the reincarnation of the princess's husband, ironically both of them died at the hands of Bóris Vladesco, directly or not. Her children are Zeca, Tetê and Júnior, but it is revealed later in the series Zeca is a vampire and the real son of Bóris named Atilla Vladesco, and her real son, Renat, grew up in the orphanage until he became homeless in the streets but he was found by Zeca, who become his friend and later revealed to her, he was her true son.

Lívia has a complex relationship with Bóris Vladescu, because in the beginning, he under the alias of Igor Pivomar, saw himself as a stranger in her life. Bóris then took over Rodrigo's body to have a chance with Lívia and they date for a time until Bóris could no longer stay much in his human body. When she comes to learn the vampire existence and Bóris being the head vampire and Igor Pivomar, she tries to stay away from him and come to hate and despise him for her husband's death. Over three occasions, Bóris tried to bite and mutate her, and failed in all. For the first time, he was interrupted by the angel Ezekiel, the second by Augusto, and in the third, he was interrupted by Princess Cecília's spirit herself, explaining to her she was saved by angels at the last second before hitting the ground. Lívia comes to respect Bóris when he becomes more benevolent and before the final battle against the forces of dark, he bids "Goodbye" and tells her he would love her in death, as he loved her in life and undeath. In response, she says "Goodbye, my darling".

Lívia begun dating district attorney Augusto and marries him at the end of the series. During the final battle, she uses a heavenly dart to destroy Martha Morta and she protects the people from the evil vampires. After the battle, she confronts Zeca about Bóris' death. She reunited Renato with her children, marries Augusto and they have a happy life together.

- Ezequiel

A holy warrior with divine powers and the antagonist to Bóris Vladesco. He disguises himself as one of the citizens of Maramures, and it is also revealed he was the vampire hunter trying to protect Princess Cecília, now reincarnated as Ezequiel. He is kind and gentle, preferring to not fight the vampires and offering the chance of retreat before fighting. Ezequiel sees the people in black, white and shades of gray. He can teleport, control fire, is a skilled swordsman and can heal other people and bless them. He forms a friendship with Zeca knowing he is not an enemy, despite being his rival's son and even helps him withstand sunlight and blessed objects. Ezequiel clashes several times with Bóris but he cannot defeat him. In the final chapter, he fights Nosferatu and kills him with the help of Zeca. With the vampires destroyed or retreating to the darkness, he returns to Heaven having finished his job on Earth.

- Augusto:

A district attorney and one of the main protagonists of the series. He is trying to protect the historical monument of Maramures. He is also in love with Lívia. At first, he is skeptical about the vampires' existence in the city until he witnesses a vampire attack at his house.

- Rodrigo:

Rodrigo is a human being who goes to Maramures after being hired to work by Bóris. Boris actually intended to use the body of Rodrigo to win Livia. Rodrigo and Livia start a relationship, but always needed to face Boris' plots. Later Rodrigo manages the power ring of ownership that leaves the user as powerful as Boris, but slowly transforms into a malignant character. At the end Rodrigo ends up also mutating into a vampire.

=== Antagonists ===
- Mina d'Montmartre

The initial antagonist of the series, she was a French actress bitten by Bóris Vladescu, who mutated her into his vampiress wife. Unfortunately, she could not give him children so Bóris abandoned her. His next vampiress wife, Márie, died giving birth to his son Atilla Vladescu, later to be known as Zeca. She tried to kill the baby, but Bóris staked her and hid the baby. Mina tried to kill Zeca several times, but he was much stronger than her.

In the middle of the series, Mina had a relationship with the human Rodrigo, and was impregnated by him telling everyone it was Bóris' child. When Mina gave birth to a baby girl, she disappeared for a long time, to return with her daughter Pandora, now a teenager. When Rodrigo is mortally wounded in the battle against Nosferatu's forces, she mutates him into a vampire and they both live together and forever.

- Nosferatu

The final antagonist appearing near the end is a master vampire much like Bóris. Despite his name, he is not associated with Count Orlok from the movie of the same name but he bears a strong resemblance to Count Dracula in his aged form in the initial chapters. He wants to destroy Bóris so he can take over his title and then raise an army of vampires to turn Maramures into a Necropolis. He destroys Galileo, and convinces several vampires to join his cause, igniting the final battle between good and evil. He orders the hotel the humans used as a stronghold to be burned and one by one the vampires loyal to him perish, until he confronts Bóris. In a sign of defiance, Bóris throws away his weapons and allows himself to be mortally wounded by Nosferatu. Then Zeca challenged Nosferatu. Empowered by the angel Ezequiel's holy power, Zeca banishes him permanently to Hell.

- Martha Morta

Augusto' sister-in-law was blinded by a car accident that killed her sister and left her nephew handicapped. She abandoned their house and lived with Bóris Vladescu, who mutated her into his vampiress wife. She becomes more mean to everyone including Bóris, who regrets biting her. Eventually she is cursed several times by him, zipping her mouth shut and taking away her fangs. She betrays Bóris and becomes Nosferatu's lover, joining his cause of destroying Bóris Vladescu, but she is destroyed in a confrontation with Lívia. Her name actually is Portuguese for "Dead Martha".

- Lara

Rodrigo's seductive ex-girlfriend, she comes to Maramures to reassure he belongs to her. Heartbroken, she meets the vampire Victor, and asks him to bite her. He obeys and mutates her into a vampiress. She is sexually attractive and seductive, but at the same time she is treacherous and predatory. She always switches sides to her own benefit, even becoming Count Dracula's personal concubine. Due to Victor's destruction, she becomes once again human.

- Victor Victorio

A vampire, he is Bóris' right-hand man. Despite his position, Victor is not loyal to Bóris and tries to overthrow him in secret. He mutates Lara into a vampiress and they become lovers, but she leaves him to be Count Dracula's lover and he in turn stalked Ciça, visiting her in her sleep, ravishing her and drinking her blood, which causes her to fade until she dies, rather than mutate into a vampiress. Victor sided with Nosferatu, in part as revenge against Bóris and in the final battle, he mortally wounds Godzilla and is destroyed by Bóris.

=== Supporting humans ===
- Galileo Van Burguer

A clumsy, absent-minded and lousy vampire hunter. His ancestor tried to destroy Bóris and Mina d'Montmartre decades ago, but they frightened him to death. Galileo belongs to the Van Burguer family, a lineage of vampire slayers bent on destroying Bóris' house. His son Bartô is skeptical about their legacy and doesn't believe in vampires. Unfortunately, Bóris' ex-wife Mina d'Montmartre and her servant Amélie attack Bartô and mutate him into a vampire but still, Galileo spares his son out of affection. Galileo is incompetent when it comes to vampire-hunting. His attempts annoy Bóris and Mina because he always misses the stake in their heart and he has a poor aim when he fires silver bullets at them. Despite his incompetence, he proves to be capable of destroying (unintentionally) Count Dracula by staking him in the heart, however he was trying to destroy Victor Victorio at the time, not Dracula.

Galileo is destroyed by Nosferatu, who incinerates him. His remains are kept inside an urn and after his death, he comes back as a ghost haunting Nosferatu and appearing to Zoroastra in visions. In the end, he joins Zoroastra's spirit in Heaven.

His name is derived from Galileo Galilei, and his family name is a joke on the Belmont family from the popular video game series Castlevania, known for also fighting against evil.

=== Supporting vampires ===
- Pandora

Mina and Rodrigo's hybrid daughter, she is dhampir for her father being human and her mother a vampiress, but she is described as always a vampiress. She is heard inside of her mother's womb, and only make a real appearance as a baby during labor only to disappear without a trace, along with Mina. She reappears, now as a beautiful and attractive teenage girl having aged at an accelerated rate until adolescence where she would hit immortality. She has a romantic relationship with Jackie, but he insisted on having a fraternal relationship with her and he is also attracted to a human girl. Unlike the other vampires, Pandora is very girly and cheerful, and not necessarily evil and cruel.

The character Pandora was created when Cláudia Raia, the actress who played Mina, became pregnant at the time of the running series, and she had to take a license to have her baby, then the author Antônio Calmon had the idea of creating a relationship between Mina and Rodrigo which would result in Pandora.

- Bart Van Burger

Galileo's only son, he is a hardcore punk-like vampire, who was mutated by Mina in order to regain her beauty. This event crushed his father Galileo, who is a vampire hunter, but he lets his son live out of mercy. Bart is quite extroverted and a joking person, but not an evil vampire, as a matter of fact, Bart is exceptionally cowardly and fearful, and rarely engage in battle unless if he came to protect his father or his lover Amélie, but occasionally runs when he is alone or in danger. In the end of the series, he is reverted to a human due to Bóris' power sustaining his vampiric energy gone with his death. His fate is unknown as Bóris survived his destruction, and it is left unclear if he will remain human or return to being a vampire.

- Amélie

Mina's vampiress servant. She is quite sissy and devilish, speaking with an evil tone of voice. She is loyal to Mina and Bóris and had dated Bart Van Burger after his metamorphosis at the fangs of Mina.

- Godzilla

A robber who tried to assault Bóris when he came to Maramures, but he mutated Godzilla into a vampire upon calling Bóris a "good-blood" and Bóris replied before biting him, "I like that, 'good blood'". Godzilla becomes loyal to Bóris alone as his chauffeur, butler and personal security man. Normally, Bóris asked Godzilla how he must curse the other vampires, and Godzilla answered by committing very bizarre acts, such as taking away their fangs, blinding them like bats and petrifying them into talking stone statues. Godzilla never did something to anger Bóris, and always would obey his master. When Bóris is destroyed at the end of the series, Godzilla becomes human again, without the vampiric energy sustained by Bóris' power. His fate is unknown as he chose to live a more good life, but it is shown that Bóris survived his death, and it is unknown if he will mutate into a vampire again though it is likely that he will.

- Dr. Petra van Petra

A vampiress doctor mutated by Mina several centuries ago, she becomes her close friend and helps her when she discovers Mina is impregnated by a human. Petra becomes Godzilla's lover and even offered her own neck for him to give the Vampire Kiss, but he becomes allergic to her perfume. Petra helps Mina give birth to her child and keeps the secret about the child' real father.

- Count Dracula

The best-known vampire in the media, he once was Vlad Tepes (Dracula the Impaler) and he was so evil that he mutated into a vampire. He traveled to Maramures and met the vampiress Lara, falling in love with her and began a relationship with her, turning Lara into his own personal concubine. He sleeps in Victor's coffin and Galileo, determined to kill Victor, staked Dracula to death, thinking he was Victor.

== Cast ==
- Flávia Alessandra - Lívia / Princess Cecília
- Tarcísio Meira - Bóris Vladescu / Igor Pivomar
- Cláudia Raia - Mina d'Montmartre
- Marco Ricca - Augusto
- Júlia Lemmertz - Marta MortaEduardo
- Alexandre Borges - Rodrigo
- Deborah Secco - Lara
- Kayky Brito - Zeca
- Glória Menezes - Zoroastra
- Luís Gustavo - Galileu Van Burger
- Gabriel Braga Nunes - Victor Victório
- Eduardo Galvão - Armando Bananeiras
- Betty Gofman - Amélie Jolie
- Tato Gabus Mendes - Bartô (Bartolomeu Van Burger)
- Ney Latorraca - Nosferatu
- Celso Frateschi - Ezequiel
- Cecília Dassi - Beatriz (Liz)
- Juliana Lohmann - Pandora de Montmatre
- Ana Rosa - Telma / Yolanda
- Claudia Mauro - Matilde
- Rosane Gofman - Dra. Petra Van Pretta
- Mário Frias - Roger
- Bianca Castanho - Ciça
- Maytê Piragibe - Lucinha
- Celso Bernini - André Barata (Baratão)
- Sérgio Menezes - Carlos
- Zezé Motta - Nair
- Mário Schoemberger - Prof. Antunes
- Tony Tornado - Godzilla (Pedrão)
- Maria Clara Mattos - Isaura
- Guilherme Piva - Monster in the mirror / Rodolfo Roberto
- Eloísa Mafalda - Dona Carmem
- Renata Nascimento - Tetê
- Thiago Farias - Renato
- Mauricio Sopif - Pedro
- Guilherme Vieira - Juninho
- Bernardo Castro Alves - Guilherme
- Maria Gladys - Gracinha
- Íris Bruzzi - Mirtes
- Lívia Rossi - Socorro
- Gésio Amadeu - Gentil
- Júlio Braga - Guarujá

=== Guest stars ===
- Thiago Lacerda - Beto / Count Rogério (Bobby)
- Beth Goulart - Marie
- Deborah Evelyn - Laura (Marta's sister)
- Dennis Carvalho - Count Dracula
- Francisco Cuoco - Nogueira
- Jorge Fernando - Vampirão

== Reception ==
=== Ratings ===
Timeslot	Episodes	Premiere		Finale		Rank	Season	Average viewership
Timeslot	Episodes	Date	Viewers (in points)	Date	Viewers (in points)	Rank	Season	Average viewership
Mondays—Saturdays; 7:15pm	215	26 August 2002	36	2 May 2003	41	#1	2002-03	28

== Soundtrack ==
=== National ===
Capa: Alexandre Borges

1. Pelos Ares - Adriana Calcanhotto (theme of Lara)
2. Isso - Titãs (theme of Rodrigo)
3. Cada Segundo - Maurício Manieri (theme of Lucinha)
4. Baya Baya - Safri Duo (theme of location)
5. A Luz Que Acende o Olhar - Deborah Blando (theme of Lívia)
6. Em Cada Amanhecer - Fábio Júnior (theme of Ciça and Carlos)
7. Asas - Maskavo (theme of Roger)
8. Eu Sei Que Vou Te Amar - Alex Guedes and Alcione (theme of Marta and Augusto)
9. Por Perto - Pato Fu (theme of Ciça)
10. Romance - Sandra de Sá (theme of Mina)
11. Puppy Love - João Júnior (theme of Zeca and Bia)
12. Blue Moon - The Marcels (theme of opening)
13. Fairy Tale (Gregorian Version) - Shaman (theme of Bóris)
14. O Beijo do Vampiro - Mú Carvalho (theme of Zeca)
15. Tudo é Possível - Kiko Zambianchi (theme of Baratão and Lucinha)
16. Temporada das Flores - Milena Monteiro (theme of Guilherme)

=== International ===
Capa: Cláudia Raia

1. Extraños Nada Más (Strangers In The Night) - Julio Iglesias (theme of Rodrigo and Lívia)
2. Fool - Shakira (theme of location: Maramores)
3. Padre Nuestro - E Nomine (theme of Ezequiel)
4. Papa Don't Preach - Kelly Osbourne (theme of Mina)
5. Another Brick In The Wall (Part 2) - Arena (theme of Zeca)
6. A Thousand Miles - Vanessa Carlton (theme of Zeca and Bia)
7. When You Say Nothing At All - Ronan Keating and Deborah Blando (theme of Baratão and Lucinha)
8. Come Away With Me - Norah Jones (theme of Marta)
9. Moonlight Serenade - Thelma Houston (theme of Zoroastra)
10. Y Tú Te Vas - Chayanne (theme of Augusto and Matilde)
11. When I Was Cruel N° 2 - Elvis Costello (theme of Victor and Lara)
12. Die For Love - Marc Ferr
13. Fool For Love - Bryan Ferry (theme of Bóris)
14. Hate To Say I Told You So - The Hives (theme of Roger)
15. The Scientist - Coldplay (theme of Roger and Ciça)
16. Give Me Tonight - Flarow (theme of location)
17. Loves Bites - The Hobbeats

=== Complementar - Vampiromania ===
Capa: Logo novel

1. Return Of Halloween - X-Fakktor
2. Nightmare 2 - DJ Zappala
3. Carolina Carol Bela (DJ Marky & Xrs Land Remix) - Toquinho
4. Só Tinha De Ser Com Você (Cosmonautics Remix) - DJ Patife, DJ Marky, Fernanda Porto, Esom
5. Sambassim - Fernanda Porto
6. Round The Corner - London Elektricity
7. Insomnia - Faithless
8. Superstylin' - Groove Armada
9. Musak - Trisco
10. Derb - Derb
11. Will I? - Ian Van Dahl
12. Hide U (Young Offendaz Remix) - Kosheen
13. Sex (Pump and Dance) - The Underground
14. Future Human - Future Human
15. Kubik - Watkins
16. O Beijo do Vampiro - Mú Carvalho (theme of Zeca)
17. Blue Moon - G.E.M.

== See also ==
- Vampire film
- List of vampire television series
