= Blue Eyes (film) =

2009 film directed by José Joffily

- Directed by: José Joffily
- Starring: David Rasche; Irandhir Santos; Cristina Lago; Erica Gimpel; Frank Grillo
- Edited by: Pedro Bronz
- Music by: Jaques Morelenbaum
- Production company: Coevos Filmes
- Distributed by: Imagem Filmes (Brazil); Schröder Media (Germany)
- Release dates: 14 July 2009 (Festival Paulínia de Cinema); 28 May 2010 (Brazil)
- Running time: 111 minutes
- Country: Brazil
- Languages: Portuguese; English; Spanish

Blue Eyes (Portuguese: Olhos Azuis) is a 2009 Brazilian drama film directed by José Joffily and starring David Rasche, Irandhir Santos, Cristina Lago, Erica Gimpel, and Frank Grillo.

== Plot ==
Not satisfied with the retirement and on his last day at the job, a U.S. immigration officer arbitrarily holds Latin American passengers inside a room of a New York airport. There he conducts interrogations that takes a surprising and tragic course.

== Cast ==
- David Rasche as Marshall
- Irandhir Santos as Nonato
- Cristina Lago as Bia
- Frank Grillo as Bob Estevez
- Erica Gimpel as Sandra
- Hector Bordoni as Augustín
- Valeria Lorca as Assumpta
- Branca Messina as Calypso
- Everaldo Pontes as Bia's grandfather
- Pablo Uranga as Martín
