= Cristina Lago =

Brazilian actress

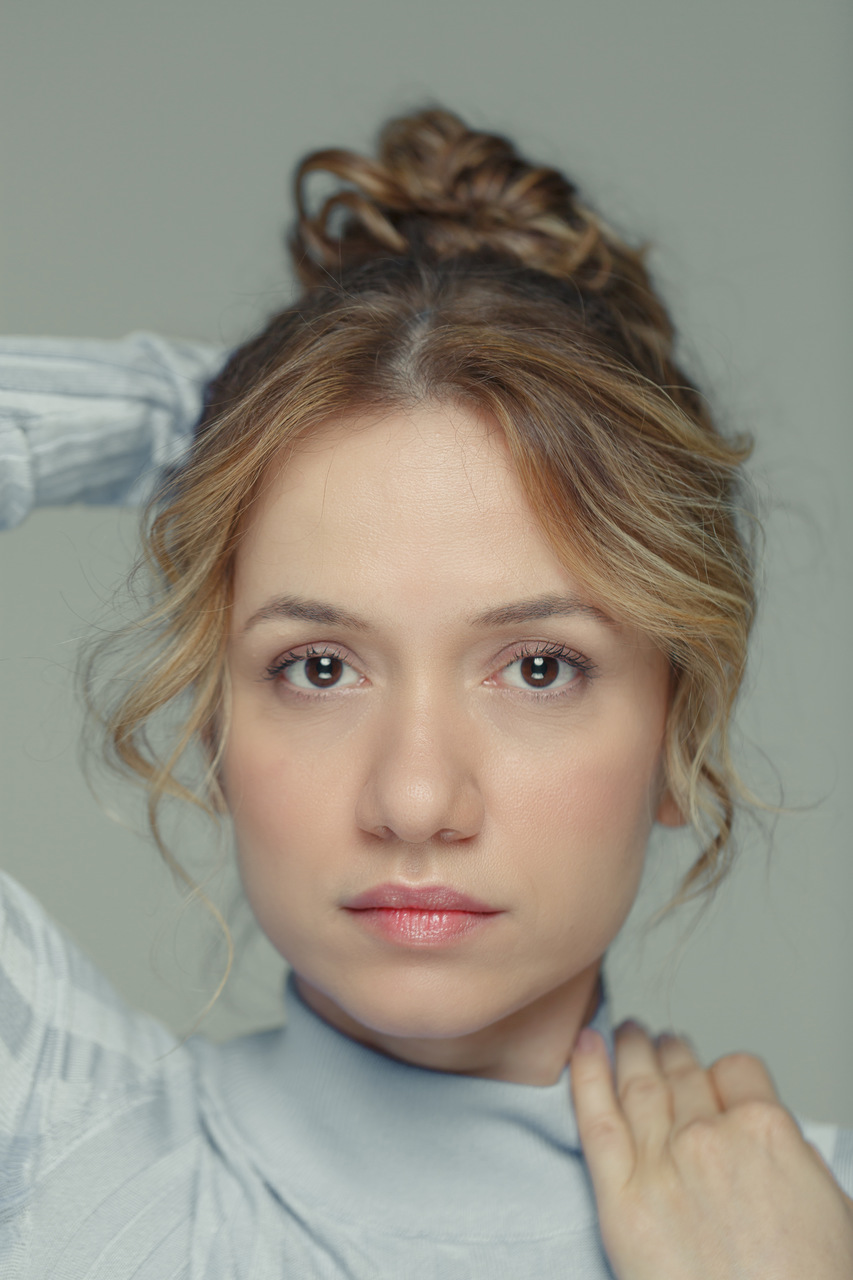
- Born: Cristina Lago; January 10, 1982 (age 43); Foz do Iguaçu, Brazil
- Occupation: Actress
- Years active: 2003–present

Cristina Lago (born January 10, 1982) is a Brazilian cinema and television actress. She played the lead role in five movies.

== Filmography ==
=== Film ===
Year	Movie	Role	Director	Notes
2007	Maré, Nossa História de Amor	Analídia	Lúcia Murat	Indicada: Prêmio Open Doek: Melhor Atriz Coadjuvante
2009	Olhos Azuis	Bia	José Joffily	Troféu Festival Paulínia de Cinema: Best actress; Prêmio 100% Vídeo: Best Actress
2009	Irmãos	Maria	Eduardo Hunter Moura	Short film
2011	Bruna Surfistinha	Gabi	Marcus Baldini	
2011	Um Dia de Maria	Maria	Lucieda Moreda	Short film
2012	O Casamento de Mário e Fia	Fia	Paulo Halm	Short film (producer)
2013	Éden	Vânia	Bruno Safadi	
2020	Silêncio da Chuva	Silvia	Daniel Filho	

=== Television ===
Year	Title	Role	Channel
2010	A Vida Alheia – Ep: O Esquema (The Plan)	Giovana	Tv Globo
2010	Os Gozadores – 1ª season	Joelma	Multishow
2011	Os Gozadores – 2ª season	Joelma	Multishow
2014	Em Família	Janice	Tv Globo
2014	Não Tá Fácil Pra Ninguém	Various characteres	Multishow
2014	Descalço Sobre a Terra Vermelha	Rosa	TV Espanhola, TV3 and TV Brasil
2015	I Love Paraisópolis	Gilda	Tv Globo
2015	PSI	Amanda	HBO
2015	As Canalhas	Julinha	GNT
2016	Malhação	Piedad	TV Globo
2017	Era Uma Vez Uma História	Carlota Joaquina	Band
2017	Sob Pressão	Priscila	Tv Globo
2018	Magnífica 70 – 3º Temporada	Bianca	HBO
2018	Pacto de Sangue	Renata	Space / Netflix
2018	Conselho Tutelar – 3º Temporada	Sheila	RecordTV
2019	Terrorres Urbanos – O Homem do Saco	Jane	RecordTV / PlayPlus

=== Teatro ===
Ano	Peça	Direção
2003–2004	Nosferatu, um pouco de nós	Marcos Henrique Rego
2004–2005	O Alfaiate do Rei	Cacá Mourthé
2007	Ariano	Gustavo Paso
2010	Agora!	Claudia Mele
2012	Chagall, o poeta com asas de pintor	João Batista
2012	Antes que você me toque	Ivan Sugahara
2014	Preciso Andar – Wunderlust	Ivan Sugahara
