= Bruna Surfistinha =

Writer and former sex worker

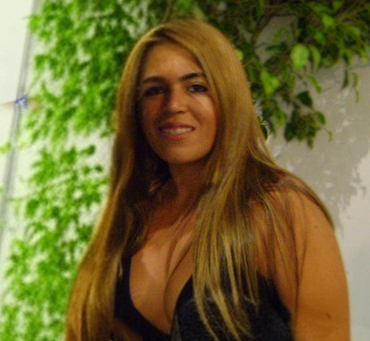
- Surfistinha in 2009
- Born: Raquel Pacheco; 28 October 1984 (age 41); Sorocaba, Brazil
- Occupations: Writer, former sex worker and former pornographic actress
- Writing career
- Pen name: Bruna Surfistinha
- Genre: Biography
- Notable work: The Scorpion's Sweet Venom

Bruna Surfistinha (Portuguese for "Little Surfer Bruna") is the pen name of Raquel Pacheco (born 28 October 1984), a Brazilian writer, disc jockey, and former sex worker who attracted the attention of Brazilian media by publishing, in a blog, her sexual experiences with clients. Bruna explained in television programs that she was a normal girl, who had been adopted by a high/middle-class family but that at around the age of 17 she left her home and her family because of the traditional family oriented views of her father and to start to live on her own. Bruna appeared in various television programs in Brazil and several periodicals and magazines. Her blog attracted more than 50,000 readers per day. She appeared in some pornographic films in Brazil. In 2005, she released a book entitled O Doce Veneno do Escorpião (The Scorpion's Sweet Venom). In just over a month it sold over 30,000 copies in its third edition, and became the best selling book in Brazil. The book was translated into English and published by Bloomsbury Publishing in 2006. Bruna's book also inspired the 2011 Brazilian film Confessions of a Brazilian Call Girl, starring Deborah Secco in the main role, and the 2016 TV series Me Chama de Bruna, starring Maria Bopp in the main role. In 2011, Bruna also appeared in a Brazilian reality show called A Fazenda (local version of The Farm) finishing as the second runner-up (third place). Confessions of a Brazilian Call Girl grossed $12,356,515 in Brazil, first national film after international films in the Brazil 2011 Box Office, thanks to Bruna's popularity with the Brazilian public.

== Biography ==
Raquel Pacheco was born in Sorocaba, the result of a sexual assault her biological mother had suffered. Her mother decided to abandon her, and within a few days the baby was in an orphanage. After a few months, she was adopted by an upper middle class Paulistana family. In interviews, she pointed out that the discovery of her adoption was one of the deciding factors for leaving home at 17, leaving a farewell letter. She also revealed in interviews that she was a very depressed child and adolescent, always socially isolated, and bullied for being withdrawn. She claims that, although she never lacked material goods, and was well educated in private schools, she did not receive much affection and attention from her parents, always being in the company of the nanny and maids. She was always the subject of humiliation by her brother, who never accepted the fact that her parents had adopted her and taken him from the position of only child, and therefore sole heir.

Additionally, the decision that led her to leave home included not wanting not depend on anyone, and to earn her own money. She did not want to wait to graduate from university to start work, as her parents wanted. After leaving home, she lived on the streets. Not wanting to continue like this, and unable to find work, she saw the announcement of a brothel in the newspaper classifieds, and became a prostitute there. Over time, to endure the pain and humiliation of living this life, she became a cocaine user. Her brother discovered her new life and told the family. As a result, the family stopped talking to her, which still makes her very sad. As she states in her blog and book, in the beginning she worked in a poor quality brothel, often serving four clients a day. After a few years she had saved some money, and underwent psychotherapeutic treatment to quit drugs and eventually managed to get out of the brothel. Renting her own apartment, she began serving clients in upscale neighbourhoods of São Paulo. After three years of this activity, she claimed to have serviced 5,000 men.

She revealed that her greatest sadness was that her father had died without talking to her again, and that she resented her mother for not wanting to see her anymore, but that she is very happy with her current life. She was married from 2005 to 2015 to a former client. She revealed that she intends to have children up to the age of forty, but that professional projects always make her postpone motherhood. In 2011, she converted to Umbanda, revealing that through this religion she found a path of healing and spiritual evolution. Surfistinha had a premonitory dream about the death of her father, so a friend took her to a yard, and there an entity confirmed that he had died, which made her desperate. She called her mother, who confirmed the death. This left her shaken and she even attempted suicide, but she has now overcome the loss with the help of spirituality.

== Internet celebrity ==
Pacheco began her literary efforts through a blog, under the name Bruna Surfistinha, where she commented on her routine as a call girl. This blog became popular among internet users, gaining about ten thousand monthly visits to the site. In this blog, she referred to preferences and customs of her nightlife in a way analogous to the ordinary diaries of teenagers. After some time as a prostitute, she met her ex-husband, João Correa de Moraes whom she publicly referred to as "Peter" or "John Paul", and whom she married in 2005. After seeing her as a client about seven times, de Moraea abandoned his then wife to live with Pacheco. In 2006, during her fame, he even made a public appearance on Programa do Jô. On April 27, 2006, The New York Times published an article about the phenomenon by Larry Rohter entitled, The One Who Controls Her Body May Annoy Her Countrymen. The article comments on the popularity of Pacheco's book in Brazil.

== Books ==
In 2005, still under the auspices of the fame of her blog, Surfistinha published an account of her life. The book, titled "O Doce Veneno do Escorpião — O Diário de uma Garota de Programa" (The Scorpion’s Sweet Venom — The Diary of a Call Girl), was a non-fictional description of life as a prostitute, written by journalist Jorge Tarquini, who collected Surfistinha's testimonials to write the work. The only page Raquel herself wrote was the last, where she says she decided to drop prostitution. In the book, the reader finds descriptions of a young prostitute who entered a world, she said, unknown, but became routine to her:

Crazies, surubas, many different men (and women) a day, almost endless nights. What can be exciting for a lot of girls like me in their twenties is routine to me. It's my daily toil.

Once released, the book quickly topped the bestseller list, with crowded book signing and release nights in Portugal and Spain, as well as several print runs. The sales reached a total of 250 thousand copies. In 2006 a second book by Raquel, "O que Aprendi com Bruna Surfistinha" (What I Learned from Bruna Surfistinha), was released by the same publisher, Panda Books, with text written by same journalist Jorge Tarquini. Sales reached 18 thousand copies, considered good for the Brazilian market. In 2007, the third book of the series was released, "Na cama com Bruna Surfistinha" (In bed with Bruna Surfistinha), this time written by Raquel Pacheco. This book has material written especially for the adult audience, and there is an age indication on the cover.

=== Film adaptation ===
The film based on Bruna's story was approved by the Ministry of Culture to receive a state subsidy. The title was to be the same as the first book, "O Doce Veneno do Escorpião" (The Sweet Poison of Scorpio), and would receive about four million reais by means of a tax waiver. The film was directed by Marcus Baldini with screenplay by José Carvalho, Homero Olivetto and Antonia Pellegrino and produced by Rio producer TvZERO. Casting began in October 2007, with the shooting originally scheduled for 2008. and the premiere for April 2010. Deborah Secco was chosen to play Raquel. The film's first teaser was released July 19, 2010. The title was later changed to simply Bruna Surfistinha, and was a box office hit.

== Adult films ==
In 2006, adult movie producer Sexxxy released the DVD 3X com Bruna Surfistinha where Raquel Pacheco participates in three pornographic stories. In an interview in Programa do Jô on Rede Globo, Rachel reported that she regretted having recorded the DVD. She revealed that she received a fee of only R$500 for her participation. Which, according to her, was the same as the fee for seeing three clients and seemed to make sense at the time.

== TV series ==
In 2016, a television series based on the life of Bruna Surfistinha was announced with the title "Me Chama de Bruna" to be shown on Fox1 pay-TV channel. The production is a partnership between FOX Brasil and TV Zero, the producers of the 2011 film. The lead role is played by actress Maria Bopp. In June 2017, FOX confirmed the start of recordings of the second season of the series, which also stars Sérgio Malheiros and Maitê Proença.
