= Vidas Opostas =

- Genre: Telenovela
- Created by: Luiz Carlos Maciel, Antônio Carlos de Fontoura, Joaquim Assis, Paula Richard, Melissa Cabral
- Written by: Marcílio Moraes
- Directed by: Alexandre Avancini; Edgard Miranda
- Starring: Maytê Piragibe; Léo Rosa; Lavínia Vlasak; Heitor Martinez; Marcelo Serrado; Lucinha Lins; Nicola Siri; Tássia Camargo; Cecil Thiré; Jussara Freire; Flávia Monteiro; Luciano Szafir; Raquel Nunes; Raul Gazola; Ana Paula Tabalipa; Babi Xavier; Roger Gobeth
- Music by: Chico Buarque
- Opening theme: "Aquarela do Brasil" (Léo Gandelman)
- Country of origin: Brazil
- Original language: Portuguese
- No. of episodes: 240

Original release
- Network: Record
- Release: November 21, 2006 – August 27, 2007

Vidas Opostas (English: Opposite Lives) is a Brazilian telenovela originally aired on Record.

The series won the Troféu Imprensa for Best Telenovela in 2008, sharing the award with Paraíso Tropical.

== Controversy ==
Because of scenes involving graphic portrayal of nudity, drugs and violence, Vidas Opostas received a 14 rating from the DJCTQ. Reuters and the Wall Street Journal even reported the fact, suggesting that the show has attained considerable success because of violent scenes, unlike most other Brazilian soap operas.

== Main cast ==
- Maytê Piragibe - Joana de Souza
- Léo Rosa - Miguel Campobello
- Lavínia Vlasak - Erínia Oliveira
- Marcelo Serrado - Delegado Dênis Nogueira
- Lucinha Lins - Ísis Campobello
- Nicola Siri - Bóris Sanches (Gennaro Allighieri / Guido Donatti / Frederico Colotti)
- Heitor Martinez - Jacson da Silva
- Jussara Freire - Carmem Laranjeira
- Flávia Monteiro - Maria Lúcia Queiróz
- Luciano Szafir - Leonardo Rocha
- Babi Xavier - Patrícia Rocha
- Raquel Nunes - Maria do Carmo
- Leandro Léo - Carlos Laranjeira (Carlinhos)
- Tássia Camargo - Lucília de Souza
- Cecil Thiré - Mário Carvalho
- Roger Gobeth - Félix Teixeira
- Juliana Lohmann - Carla Rocha
- Andressa Oliveira - Maria Júlia
- Íris Bruzzi - Elisa Rocha (Lizinha)
- Cristina Pereira - Margarida
- João Sabiá - Sílvio
- Ana Paula Tabalipa - Neusa Nogueira
- Sílvia Bandeira - Cilene Oliveira
- Mário Schoemberger - Sérgio Ventura
- Daniel Dalcin - Alfredo Oliveira
- Raul Gazolla - Hélio
- Valquíria Ribeiro - Isabel Lopes
- Alexandre Paternost - Pedro Lopes
- Sílvio Guindane - Cecílio Cristal (Cicio)
- Nill Marcondes - Hermenegildo Torres
- Gabriela Durlo - Daniela Cavalcanti
- Gilson Moura - Genivaldo Cavalcanti (Mofado)
- Leandro Firmino - José Ferreira (Sovaco)
- Phellipe Haagensen - Pavio
- Felipe Martins - Pé de Pato
- Henrique Pires - Zaqueu (Caranguejo)
- Bukassa Kabengele - Marcelo
- Marcelo Escorel - Roberto
- Maria Sílvia - Mercedes
- Blota Filho - Renato Abreu
- Telma Cunha - Sueli
- Dulce Bressane - Rute
- Tila Teixeira - Eneida
- Jonathan Nogueira - Chico
- Renata Quintela - Cristina
- Marise Gonçalves - Amélia
- Valnei Aguiar - Eleutério
- Rafael Queiroga - Inhame
- Alessandro Maciel - Cotia
- Marcos Barreto - Fausto
