= Babi Xavier =

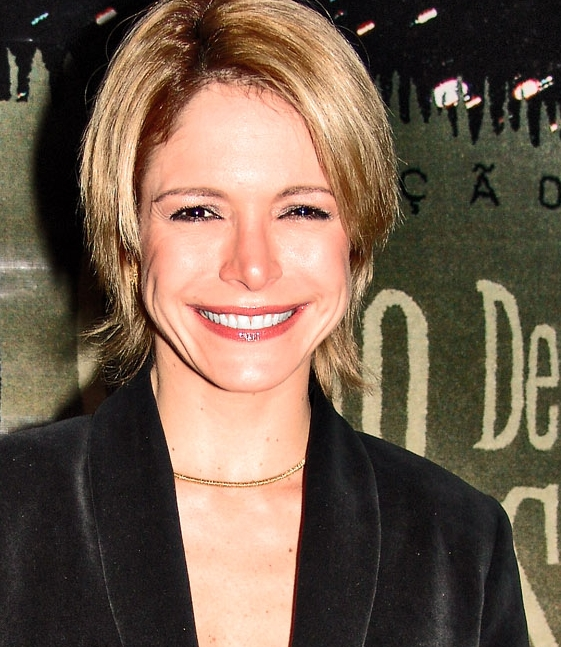
- Born: Anna Bárbara Xavier; July 6, 1974 (age 52); Niterói, Rio de Janeiro, Brazil
- Occupations: Television actress, singer, presenter

Babi Xavier (born Anna Bárbara Xavier; 6 July 1974, in Niterói, Rio de Janeiro) is a Brazilian television actress, Playboy model, singer and TV hostess.

== Career ==
Babi made her TV debut on the soap opera Perdidos de Amor in 1996, which aired on Rede Bandeirantes. Then, in 1997, she acted in the soap opera Por Amor (For Love), on Rede Globo. A year later, she was chosen to present the news program Sintonia Fina, where she learned the trade of hostess and rescued her childhood nickname, Babi. The following year, she added to her work the position of presenter at MTV Brasil, where she had her highlight with the MTV Erótica program, in which she talked together with doctor Jairo Bouer, about sexuality and behavior. At the station she completed her activities ahead of the programs Mochilão Abrolhos and Supermodel.

== Television ==
- Perdidos de Amor (Band, 1996) – Ivea, actress
- Por Amor (Globo, 1997) – Aninha, actress
- Sintonia Fina (SKY Brasil, 1998)
- Erótica MTV (MTV, 1998)
- Mochilão MTV (MTV, 1999)
- Supermodel (MTV, 1999)
- Programa Livre (SBT, 1999)
- Ilha da Sedução (SBT, 2002)
- Bang Bang (Globo, 2005) – Marylin Corroy, actress
- Vidas Opostas (Record, 2006 and 2007) – Patrícia Rocha, actress
- Os Mutantes – Caminhos do Coração (Record, 2008) – Júli di Trevi, actress
- A Fazenda, (Record), 2009.
- José do Egito, (Record), 2013. – Elisa
- Os Dez Mandamentos (RecordTV), 2015. – Tais

== Television – Guest Star ==
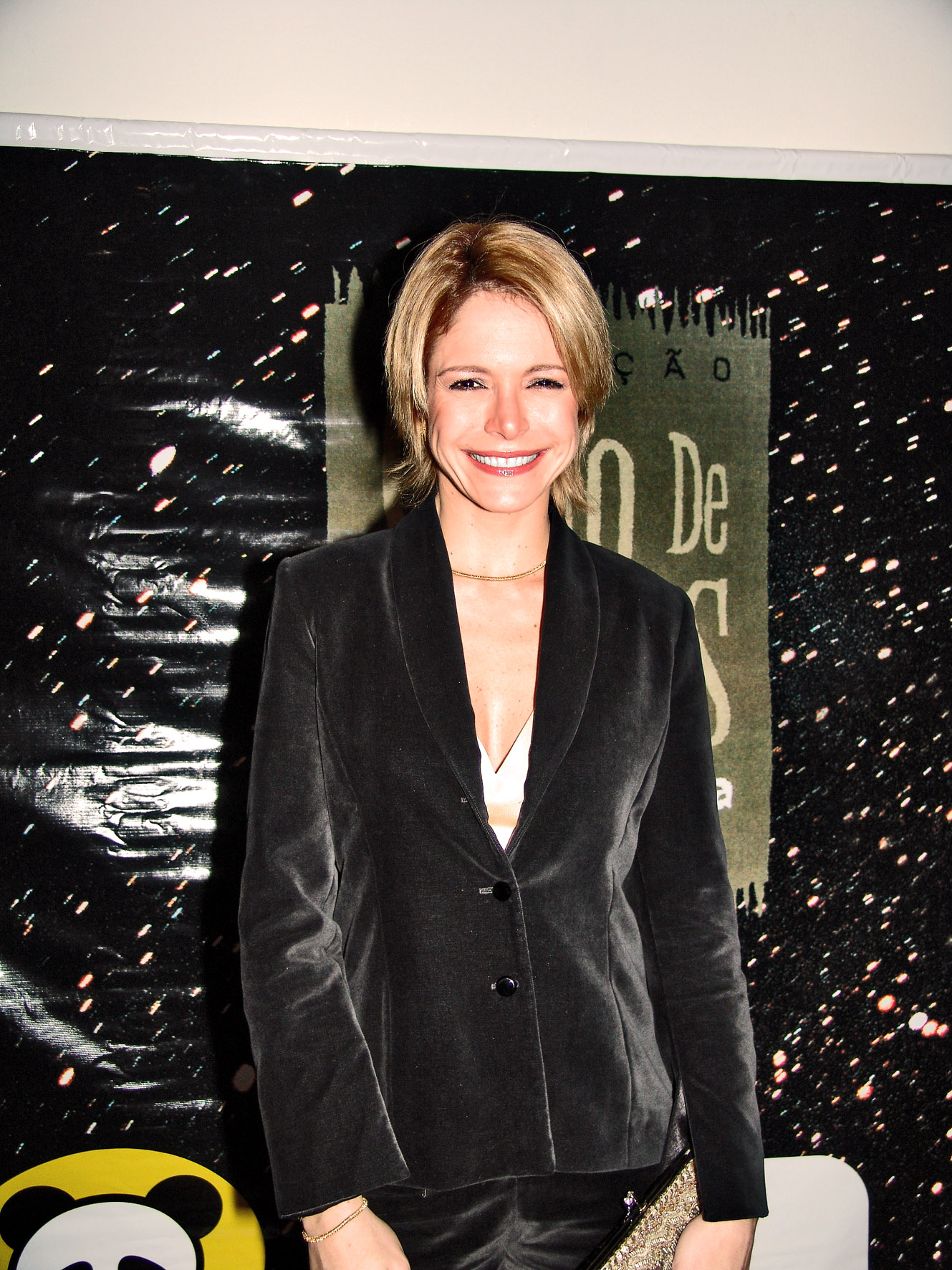
Babi

- Você Decide – (Globo, 1996) – Episode: Véu de Noiva, actress
- A Diarista – (Globo, 2005) – Episode: Aquele do Anão, actress
- Dança dos Famosos, Domingão do Faustão – (Globo, 2006), dancer

Season 3: The third season premiered on May 14, 2006, and ended August 6, 2006. The number of couples expanded from six the previous season to twelve. It was divided in two rounds. In the first, men will dance separated of women. After 4 couples eliminated, the 8 couples left begin the final round where everybody dances together.

=== Couples ===
Celebrity	Occupation	Professional Partner	Status
Robson Caetano	Olimpic Athlete and TV Host	Ivonete Liberatto	Winners on August 6, 2006
Stepan Nercessian	Comedian and Actor	Michelle Cerbino	Runners-Up on August 6, 2006
Babi Xavier	Actress and Singer	Hélio Faria	Third Place – Eliminated 9th on July 16, 2006
Hortência Marcari	Former Basketball Player	Alex de Carvalho	Eliminated 8th on July 9, 2006
Nívea Maria	Actress	Charles Fernandes	Eliminated 7th on July 2, 2006
Preta Gil	Singer	Átila Amaral	Withdrew on June 25, 2006
Guilherme Berenguer	Malhação Star	Thaiza Adaltro	Eliminated 6th on June 18, 2006
Oscar Magrini	Actor	Aline Barbosa	Eliminated 5th on June 11, 2006
Mariana Felício	Big Brother 6 Runner-Up	Guilherme Abilhôa	Eliminated 4th on June 4, 2006
Ricardo Tozzi	Actor	Carol Vieira	Eliminated 3rd on May 28, 2006
Roberta Foster	Comedian	Ari Paulo	Eliminated 2nd on May 21, 2006
Daniel Erthal	Actor	Priscila Marins	Eliminated 1st on May 14, 2006

=== Results ===
Eliminated	Bottom 2	Withdrew	1st Call-Out	Winners

Team	Place	1	2	3	4	5	6	7	8	9	10	12	13
Robson & Ivonete	1	54,0		107,0		53,7	113,3	173,1	226,8	284,5	116,7	118,7	292,8
Stepan & Michelle	2	51,0		110,0		59,5	117,8	176,5	235,1	289,5	116,9	117,3	292,8
Babi & Hélio	3		58,0		117,0	56,5	116,1	166,8	226,5	284,3	112,5		
Hortência & Alex	4		58,0		112,0	59,7	117,3	170,0	224,3	281,4			
Nívea & Charles	5		59,0		117,0	60,0	117,3	170,5	223,5				
Preta Gil & Átila	6		57,0		114,0	56,8	116,5	WD					
Guilherme & Thaiza	7	52,0		112,0		54,8	109,8						
Oscar & Aline	8	53,0		105,0		53,4							
Mariana & Guilherme	9		54,0		106,0								
Ricardo & Carol	10	53,0		103,0									
Roberta & Ari	11		49,0										
Daniel & Priscila	12	50,0											

=== Dances ===
Couple	1+2	3+4	5	6	7	8	9	10		12		13		
Robson & Ivonete	Disco	Merengue	Bolero	Forró	Flamenco	Rock	Lambada	Doble	Country	Maxixe	Foxtrot	Gafieira	Tango	Disco
Stepan & Michelle	Disco	Merengue	Bolero	Forró	Flamenco	Rock	Lambada	Doble	Country	Maxixe	Foxtrot	Gafieira	Tango	Rock
Babi & Hélio	Disco	Merengue	Bolero	Forró	Flamenco	Rock	Lambada	Doble	Country					
Hortência & Alex	Disco	Merengue	Bolero	Forró	Flamenco	Rock	Lambada							
Nívea & Charles	Disco	Merengue	Bolero	Forró	Flamenco	Rock								
Preta Gil & Átila	Disco	Merengue	Bolero	Forró	Flamenco									
Guilherme & Thaiza	Disco	Merengue	Bolero	Forró										
Oscar & Aline	Disco	Merengue	Bolero											
Mariana & Guilherme	Disco	Merengue												
Ricardo & Carol	Disco	Merengue												
Roberta & Ari	Disco													
Daniel & Priscila	Disco													

Highest Scoring Dance
Lowest Scoring Dance
Withdrawn Dance (Not Performed/Scored)

=== Call-Out Order ===
Order	Weeks											
Order	1	2	3	4	5	6	7	8	9	10	12	13
1	Babi	Robson	Nívea	Guilherme	Nívea	Stepan	Stepan	Stepan	Stepan	Stepan	Robson	Robson
2	Hortência	Oscar	Babi	Stepan	Hortência	Hortência	Robson	Robson	Robson	Robson	Stepan	Stepan
3	Mariana	Ricardo	Hortência	Robson	Stepan	Nívea	Nívea	Babi	Babi	Babi		
4	Nívea	Guilherme	Preta Gil	Oscar	Preta Gil	Preta Gil	Hortência	Hortência	Hortência			
5	Preta Gil	Stepan	Mariana	Babi	Babi	Babi	Babi	Nívea				
6	Roberta	Nívea	Guilherme	Nívea	Guilherme	Robson	Preta Gil					
7	Robson	Babi	Stepan	Preta Gil	Robson	Guilherme						
8	Oscar	Hortência	Robson	Hortência	Oscar							
9	Ricardo	Preta Gil	Oscar	Mariana								
10	Guilherme	Mariana	Ricardo									
11	Stepan	Roberta										
12	Daniel											

The celebrity was the first of the week
The celebrity withdrew from the competition
The celebrity was eliminated
The celebrity won the competition

The Farm (TV series) (Record, 2009) – A Fazenda/Reality Show

== Music ==
- Babi - Do Jeito Que Eu Quero (2002), Universal Music

Track list:

1. "Imunização Racional (Que Beleza)"
2. "Só O Que Preciso Ter"
3. "O Que Será (À Flor Da Terra)"
4. "É Tudo Que Eu Tenho Pra Dizer (Revelação)"
5. "Não Quero Lembrar"
6. "Baby, Não Pare"
7. "Chamar Pra Dançar"
8. "Quero Passar"
9. "Só Pra Ser"
