= Kayky Brito =

Brazilian actor (born 1988)

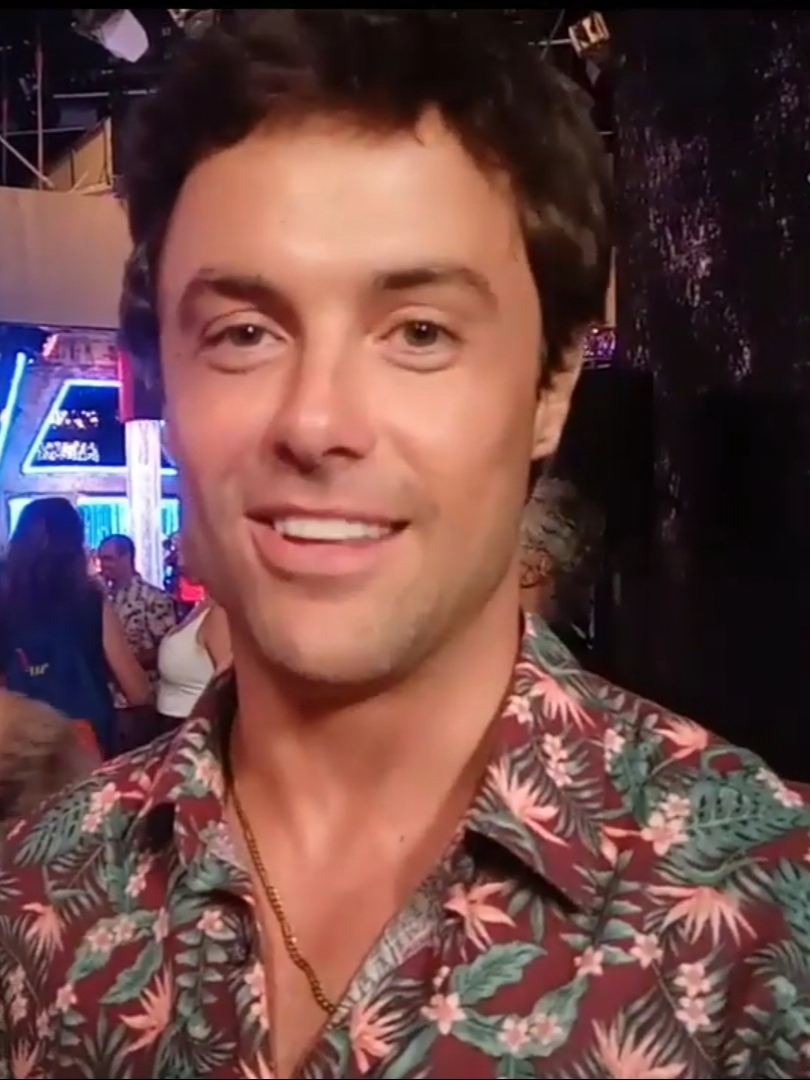
- Kayky Brito in 2019
- Born: Kayky Fernandes de Brito; October 6, 1988 (age 37); São Paulo, Brazil
- Occupation: Actor
- Years active: 1997–present
- Height: 1.82 cm

Kayky Fernandes de Brito (born October 6, 1988) is a Brazilian actor. He is the younger brother of actress Sthefany Brito.

== Career ==
In 2003, he played himself in "Domingão do Faustão". He has played characters in "Chiquititas Brasil", "O Beijo do Vampiro", Xuxa Abracadabra, "Chocolate com Pimenta", "A Diarista", "Começar de Novo", "Alma Gêmea", Socorro, Virei Uma Garota!, "Cobras & Lagartos", and most recently, "Sete Pecados". He also acted in a theater production of "A Ordem Natural das Coisas" in 2003, a TV commercial for Carrefour in 2004, and another commercial in 2006 for Havaianas. He's playing a character in "Passione".

== Awards ==
He was nominated for Contigo's best supporting actor award in 2003, for "Chocolate com Pimenta." In 2004, he won for Contigo's most promising actor award, for his part in "O Beijo do Vampiro."
