= Confessions of a Brazilian Call Girl =

2011 film by Marcus Baldini

- Theatrical release poster
- Portuguese: Bruna Surfistinha
- Directed by: Marcus Baldini
- Screenplay by: José Carvalho; Homero Olivetto; Antônia Pellegrino
- Based on: The Scorpion's Sweet Venom: The Diary of a Brazilian Call Girl by Bruna Surfistinha
- Produced by: Roberto Berliner; Rodrigo Letier; Marcus Baldini
- Starring: Deborah Secco; Cássio Gabus Mendes; Fabiula Nascimento; Cristina Lago; Guta Ruiz; Drica Moraes
- Cinematography: Marcelo Corpanni
- Edited by: Manga Campion; Oswaldo Santana
- Music by: Gui Amabis; Rica Amabis; Tejo
- Production companies: TV Zero; Damasco Filmes; Rio Filmes; Telecine Productions; TeleImage
- Distributed by: Imagem Filmes
- Release date: 25 February 2011 (Brazil)
- Running time: 109 minutes
- Country: Brazil
- Language: Portuguese
- Budget: R$4–6 million
- Box office: $12.4 million

Confessions of a Brazilian Call Girl (Portuguese: Bruna Surfistinha, lit. 'Bruna Little Surfer Girl') is a 2011 Brazilian biographical erotic drama film directed by Marcus Baldini, based on the 2005 autobiographical novel The Scorpion's Sweet Venom: The Diary of a Brazilian Call Girl by Bruna Surfistinha. The film stars Deborah Secco (as Bruna Surfistinha), Cássio Gabus Mendes, Fabiula Nascimento, Cristina Lago, Guta Ruiz and Drica Moraes. Filming began in September 2009 in Paulínia and São Paulo.

== Plot ==
Seventeen-year-old Raquel Pacheco, who is adopted by an upper-middle-class family, decides to leave her adoptive family and studies at a traditional school in São Paulo behind to become a prostitute, and later a call girl. Shortly after starting work, she decides to write a blog about her experiences. Since some clients thought she looked like a surfer, she adopts the name "Surfistinha", which means "little surfer girl". Her blog becomes a sensation, and quickly becomes one of the most popular blogs in Brazil. Becoming famous, her life changes significantly. She goes on to be interviewed on Brazilian talk shows similar to Oprah and David Letterman, all the while continuing her blog about her racy exploits. However, soon afterwards the fame gets to her in the form of a drug addiction, which makes her do almost anything for a hit.

== Cast ==
- Deborah Secco as Bruna Surfistinha
- Cássio Gabus Mendes as Huldson
- Cristina Lago as Gabi
- Drica Moraes as Larissa
- Fabiula Nascimento as Janine
- Guta Ruiz as Carol
- Clarisse Abujamra as Celeste
- Luciano Chirolli as Otto
- Sérgio Guizé as Rodrigo
- Simone Iliescu as Yasmin
- Érika Puga as Mel
- Brenda Lígia as Kelly
- Gustavo Machado as Miguel
- Juliano Cazarré as Gustavo
- Rodrigo Dorado as Rominho
- Roberto Audio as Gian
- Plínio Soares as publicist
- Sidney Rodrigues as Tomás

== Accolades ==
Year	Award	Category	Recipient(s)	Result
2011	Prêmio Contigo Cinema	Best Film	Marcus Baldini	Won
2011	Prêmio Contigo Cinema	Best Director	Marcus Baldini	Nominated
2011	Prêmio Contigo Cinema	Best Actress	Deborah Secco	Won
2011	Prêmio Contigo Cinema	Best Supporting Actress	Fabíula Nascimento	Nominated
2012	Grande Prêmio Brasileiro de Cinema	Best Film	Marcus Baldini	Nominated
2012	Grande Prêmio Brasileiro de Cinema	Best Actress	Deborah Secco	Won
2012	Grande Prêmio Brasileiro de Cinema	Best Actor	Cássio Gabus Mendes	Nominated
2012	Grande Prêmio Brasileiro de Cinema	Best Supporting Actress	Drica Moraes	Won
2012	Grande Prêmio Brasileiro de Cinema	Best Supporting Actress	Fabíula Nascimento	Nominated
2012	Grande Prêmio Brasileiro de Cinema	Best Costume Design	Letícia Barbieri	Nominated
2012	Grande Prêmio Brasileiro de Cinema	Best Makeup and Hairstyling	Gabi Moraes	Nominated
2012	Grande Prêmio Brasileiro de Cinema	Best Visual Effects	Eduardo Souza e Rodrigo Lima	Nominated
2012	Grande Prêmio Brasileiro de Cinema	Best Adapted Screenplay	Antonia Pellegrino, Homero Olivetto e José de Carvalho	Won
2012	Grande Prêmio Brasileiro de Cinema	Best Editing for Fiction	Manga Campion e Oswaldo Santana	Nominated
