= Cecília Dassi =

Brazilian actress

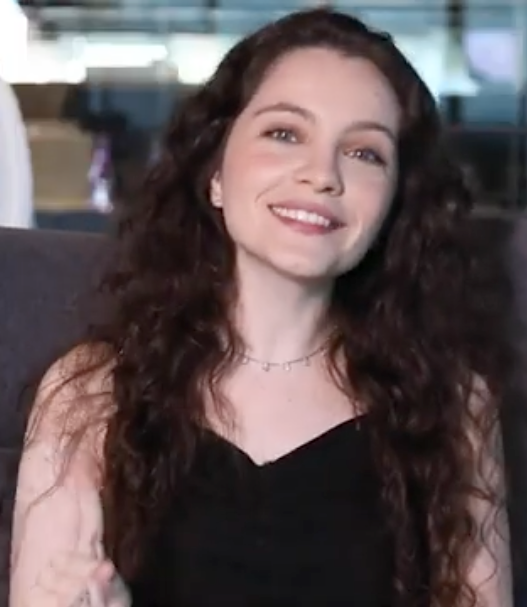
- In a 2022 video
- Born: December 6, 1989 (age 36); Esteio, Rio Grande do Sul, Brazil
- Occupations: Actress (early); Psychologist (now)
- Years active: 1994–2012
- Awards: TV: Troféu APCA Most promising newcomer 1997 Por Amor
- Website: http://www.ceciliadassi.com

Cecília Dassi (born December 6, 1989, in Esteio, Rio Grande do Sul) is a Brazilian retired actress famous for her work on Rede Globo soap operas.

== Career ==
=== On television ===
==== As actress ====
Soap operas

- 1997 - Por Amor .... Sandra/Sandrinha (supporting actress)
- 1999 - Suave Veneno .... Patrícia/Patty (supporting actress)
- 2001 - A Padroeira .... Zoé (supporting actress)
- 2002 - O Beijo do Vampiro .... Beatriz/Bia (supporting actress)
- 2005 - Alma Gêmea .... Mirella (supporting actress)
- 2007 - Sete Pecados .... Estela (supporting actress)
- 2008 - Três Irmãs .... Natália (supporting actress)
- 2009 - Viver a Vida .... Clarissa (supporting actress)

===== Miniseries =====
- 2002 - O Quinto dos Infernos .... princess Maria da Glória (supporting actress)

===== Various =====
- 1996 - A Comédia da Vida Privada - episode: Parece que foi ontem
- 1996 - Você Decide - episode: Um mundo cão (protagonist)
- 2000 - Bambuluá .... Gute
- 2000 - Milênio: Show da Virada - special participation

==== As presenter ====
- 2004/2005 - TV Globinho

=== On cinema ===
- 2008 - A Guerra dos Rochas .... Bebel

=== In theater ===
- 2003 - Branca de Neve .... Branca de Neve
- 2004 - Com Brinquedo só se Brinca

== Awards and nominations ==
Awards

- Prêmio Contigo!
  - 1998 - Best child actress, for Por Amor.
  - 2003 - Best child actress, for O Beijo do Vampiro.
- Prêmio FestNatal
  - 1997 - Most promising actress, for Por Amor.
- Prêmio Master
  - 1997 - Most promising actress, for Por Amor.
- Troféu APCA
  - 1997 - Most promising newcomer, for Por Amor.

Nominations

- Prêmio Contigo!
  - 2006 - Best child actress, for Alma Gêmea.
- Troféu Imprensa
  - 1997 - Revelation of the year, for Por Amor.

== Bibliography ==
- PROJETO MEMÓRIA DAS ORGANIZAÇÕES GLOBO (2003). Dicionário da TV Globo - vol. 1: Programas de Dramaturgia & Entretenimento (in Portuguese). Rio de Janeiro: Jorge Zahar. ISBN 85-7110-722-X.
