= Deborah Secco =

Brazilian actress (born 1979)

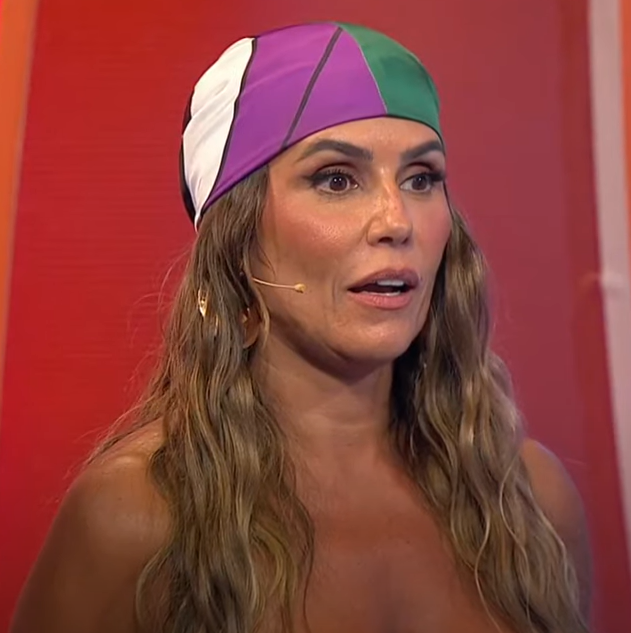
- Secco in 2024
- Born: Deborah Fialho Secco; 26 November 1979 (age 46); Rio de Janeiro, Brazil
- Occupation: Actress
- Years active: 1989–present
- Spouses: Rogério Gomes (m. 1997; div. 2001) Roger Flores (m. 2009; div. 2013) Hugo Moura (m. 2015; div. 2024)
- Children: 1

Deborah Fialho Secco (born 26 November 1979) is a Brazilian actress and model. She became known in 1994 as one of the protagonists of the teen series Confissões de Adolescente. On television, she played successful characters such as Íris in Laços de Família, Darlene in Celebridade, Sol in América, Natalie Lamour in Insensato Coração, Karola in Segundo Sol and Alexia Máximo in Salve-se Quem Puder. In cinema, she stood out as Moema in Caramuru - A Invenção do Brasil, Judite in Boa Sorte and the title character in Bruna Surfistinha.

== Career ==
At the age of 8, she made her TV debut in advertising; at 10 years, staged her first spectacle, Brincando de Era uma Vez; and at 11 years, she acted in her first novel, Mico Preto of Rede Globo. For the next four years, she would dedicate herself to the theater, and would make special appearances in serials and miniseries of Globo.

While playing in theatre, such as Sapatinhos Vermelhos, which earned her the nomination for the Coca-Cola Theater Award, in the category of Best Actress Breakthrough, television participated in the episodes "Tabu" and "Mamãe Coragem", Você Decide program, the children's school of Escolinha do Professor Raimundo, in celebration of Children's Day, both in 1992. She then made a special participation in the miniseries Contos de Verão and was in the assembly of the play O Soldadinho de Chumbo. She then staged A Roupa Nova do Imperador, 1994, when she moved to TV Cultura, where she starred in the series Confissões de Adolescente, in the shoes of the clever Carol, a job that catapulted her to fame, earned her recognition, and earned her the APCA Award in the category of Breakthrough Actress.

In 1995, she returned to Rede Globo, where she remains until the present day with exclusive contract of artist of the first step, and acted in her first novel of prime time, A Próxima Vítima. In 1996, she played Barbara's spirited novel Vira-Lata, who for a good part of the plot pretends to be a boy, given the name Tatu. Later, she appeared in the novel Zazá, like Dora, granddaughter of the protagonist lived by Fernanda Montenegro, and, in 1998, acted in her first novel of the six, Era uma Vez..., like Emília, mischievous girl who lives in the interior.

In 1999, she participated in the novel Suave Veneno, as WAGs. In August of that year, she posed for the first time for the Brazilian edition of Playboy magazine, in the magazine's 24-year anniversary edition. In 2000, she played her first villain in novels, the Iris of Laços de Família. In 2001, she gained her first protagonist in novels, the Cecília de Sá of A Padroeira of Walcyr Carrasco.

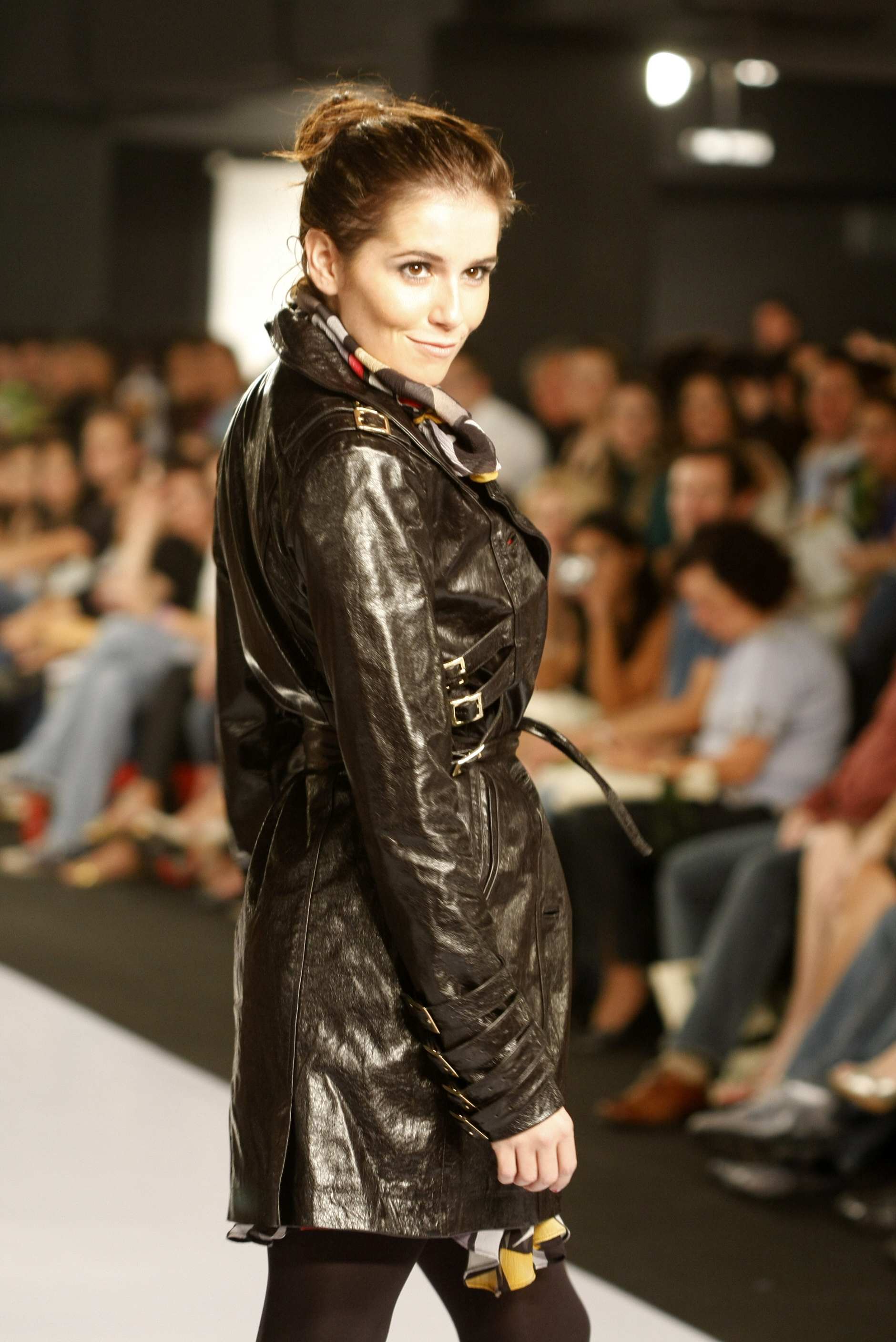
Deborah Secco in 2008.

In 2002, she played a villain on TV again, but different from the other, the vampire Lara, role that played in the novel O Beijo do Vampiro, is comical and clumsy. In that year, she was elected the character of novels most wanted by the viewers. Due to the great sensual appeal and the great prominence in the novel due to the success of Lara, she printed the cover of Playboy in the edition of anniversary of 27 years of the magazine, in August of that year.

In 2003, she integrated the cast of the novel Celebridade, in the skin of Darlene Sampaio, girl obsessed by the fame. In 2005, she played her first primetime character in America – Sol, a woman who tries to make a living in the United States, even if she is an illegal immigrant. The following year, she participated in Dance in the Ice, of the program Domingão do Faustão, being in third place. Halfway through, she broke two ribs. Still this year, she played her third protagonist and at the same time her third villain, the perverse Elizabeth of Pé na Jaca. In 2007 she made a special guest appearance in the soap opera Paraíso Tropical, as prostitute Betina, Bebel's friend, by Camila Pitanga, who appears only to disrupt the marriage of villain Olavo, Wagner Moura, and Guilhermina Guinle's Alice.

In 2008, she co-starred in the novel A Favorita, where she lived the ambitious and disguised recruiter Maria do Céu, a girl of humble origin who does not accept her condition and does everything to rise in life. She has become a girl of the brand Scala since October of that year. With the actress, the sales of the Flip bras increased from 10 thousand to 40 thousand in less than a month. Still in 2008 she made a nude rehearsal for RG Vogue, who chose the actress as the "favorite complete" and "sexiest woman in Brazilian TV".

On March 4, 2010, Folha Online published an article regarding a complaint by the Brazilian Public Prosecutor's Office, accusing Deborah Secco and other 86 people for administrative impropriety. The complaint, upheld by the Rio de Janeiro state court, describes irregularities in Deborah Secco's participation in advertisements by the governments of Anthony and Rosinha Garotinho, with whom five of Deborah's family members would have been involved, according to the complaint, to appropriate irregularly public money. According to the newspaper O Globo, the complaint indicates that Deborah Secco's bank accounts received at least 158 thousand reais in public resources diverted in a scheme commanded by her father. According to the defense of the actress, Deborah Secco, the two brothers and the mother were used by her father, the businessman Ricardo Ribeiro Secco, like "oranges", without their consent; they said they had no knowledge of the bank accounts to which they were diverted R$ 894,000 from the coup. Deborah and her family had all the assets blocked by a court decision.

Also in the same year, she staged the play "Uma Uma Amor Amor", along with Erom Cordeiro, and also participated in the filming of the short film "Como Como Ela" by Flora Diegues. At the end of the year, she returned with the series As Cariocas, being the penultimate protagonist of the series like Alice, a woman who wants to live everything intensely in the episode A Suicida da Lapa.

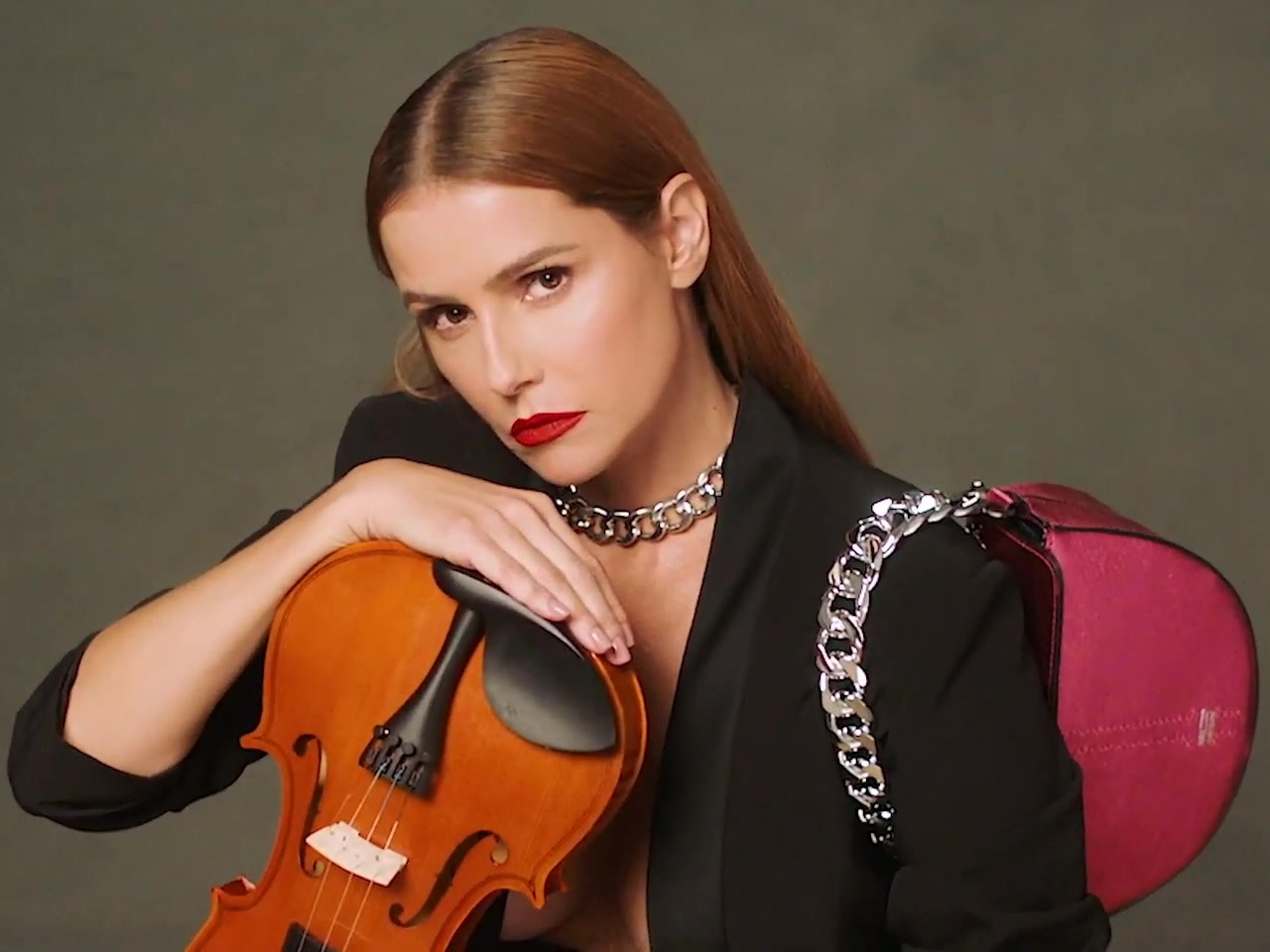
Deborah Secco (2020)

In 2011, she starred in the film of a former prostitute Bruna Surfistinha: O Doce Veneno do Escorpião, also starred in the short film Assim Como Ela Still this year, she interpreted one of the protagonists of the novel Insensato Coração, the comic personage Natalie Lamour. The personage fell in the taste of the public and was praised even by President Dilma Rousseff. The actress was the second most populated Brazilian of the internet, due to the premiere of the film and the personage of the novel, the actress jumped of the ninth place for the second, being behind only the president Dilma, in the month of January. As a result of the sensual appeal that she had in their respective works, she won two awards for her interpretation of Bruna Surfistinha, at the beginning of the year, one by the popular jury and technical jury. also chosen the Woman of the Year, by the magazine Alfa. On November 30, the actress went on to two awards on the same day for her work on the novel Insensato Coração, and she won both, one in the Extra TV Award, for the category of Supporting Actress and another by Veja Rio as actress of the year. On December 6, the actress received another award, the personality of the year in dramaturgy, an event promoted by Editora Três, which was attended by President Dilma Rousseff as well. According to a note released by Veja magazine, Deborah Secco was the most cited Brazilian celebrity in the year 2011 by the press. That same year, she was voted the sexiest woman in the world by readers of VIP magazine.

In 2012, Secco was elected as one of the 100 most influential personalities of the year by IstoÉ magazine. That same year, she was inducted by Steven Spielberg to work in Hollywood, where she represented Brazil at the 40th AFI Life Achievement Awards, which honored actress Shirley MacLaine. At the event she also met actress Meryl Streep.

In 2013 Deborah Secco recorded the feature film Boa Sorte, in which she gives life to the positive serum Judite. To interpret the character, the actress had to lose 12 kg, becoming very underweight, the whole process of weight loss of the actress was accompanied by professionals, the film was scheduled to debut on May 30, 2014.

In 2014, she gained 8 kg for the character from the movie Estrada do Diabo. The feature film has not yet been scheduled for release. Still in 2014, the actress played the stewardess Ines, in Boogie Oogie. She was later cast as the protagonist of Walcyr Carrasco's novel Secret Truths, but left the novel because of pregnancy. In November 2014, Deborah was honored by the 24th Cine Ceará – Ibero-American Film Festival, where she received the Eusélio Oliveira trophy in recognition of her national film career.

In 2015, she would live the protagonist Carolina in the novel Verdades Secretas of Walcyr Carrasco, but during the recordings, she discovered her first pregnancy, fruit of the relationship with the present boyfriend, the Bahian Hugo Moura, consequently left the plot. In 2016, she integrated the cast of Malhação, like the batmanadora Tânia. In 2017, Secco was cast as Karola, the main villain Segundo Sol. In the plot set in Bahia, her character is a former prostitute exploited by her pimp, portrayed by Adriana Esteves.

In 2017, Débora was invited to play another villain: Karola, in Segundo Sol. In the plot set in Bahia, her character is a prostitute exploited by her pimp, played by Adriana Esteves. At the same time, his character is in love and even obsessed with the protagonist, Beto (Emilio Dantas), and does everything to separate him from his great love, Luzia (Giovanna Antonelli). In the plot, she is the lover of Remy (Vladimir Brichta) and has a son called Valentim (Danilo Mesquita). The serial, written by João Emanuel Carneiro, debuted in the first half of 2018 correcting O Outro Lado do Paraíso.

== Personal life ==
Secco was born into a middle-class family, daughter of Sílvia Regina Fialho, a homemaker, and Ricardo Secco, a mathematics teacher of Italian descent. She has two siblings, Ricardo and Bárbara.

In the mid-1990s, Secco was in a relationship with actor Daniel Del Sarto, but they eventually broke up. She was later engaged to Marcelo Faustini, but the relationship ended before the two married.

In 1997, she met director Rogério Gomes, who eventually became her spouse until their divorce in 2001. After the divorce, she began dating Maurício Mattar, but the relationship ended after eleven months. She began dating Dado Dolabella in 2002, and within one month, the two were engaged and living together. Their relationship ended ten months later and she became involved with Marcelo Faria in 2003. She separated from him in 2004 and began a relationship with Erik Marmo. From 2004 to 2006, she was romantically linked with O Rappa vocalist Marcelo Falcão, whose name she later tattooed on her foot, but the relationship ended and she had the tattoo removed.

In 2007, Deborah began dating soccer player Roger Flores, in a few months they lived together. After two years living together, Deborah married Flores on June 6, 2009, in Itaipava, a mountain region of Rio de Janeiro, in a discreet ceremony. They separated amicably in April 2013. after four years of marriage, with a brief breakup in 2010.

On December 4, 2015, after marrying Hugo Moura, Secco gave birth to their first child, Maria Flor.

In September 2022, she admitted she is bisexual and has dated women.

== Filmography ==
=== Television ===
Year	Title	Role	Notes
1990	Mico Preto	Denise Menezes Garcia	
1990	Meu Bem, Meu Mal		Cameo
1992	Você Decide		Episode: "Tabu"
1992	Escolinha do Professor Raimundo	Capituzinha	
1992	Você Decide		Episode: "Mamãe Coragem"
1993	Contos de Verão	Fabíola	
1994	Confissões de Adolescente (Series)	Carol	
1995	A Próxima Vítima	Carina Carvalho Rossi	
1996	Você Decide		Episode: "Justiça"
1996	Vira-Lata	Tatu / Bárbara	
1997	Zazá	Dora Dumont	
1998	Era Uma Vez...	Emilia Zanella	
1999	Suave Veneno	Marina Canhedo	
1999	Você Decide	Socorro	Episode: "A Filha de Maria"
2000	Terra Nostra	Hannah	Cameo
2000	A Invenção do Brasil	Moema	
2000	Laços de Família	Íris Frank Lacerda	
2001	Sítio do Picapau Amarelo	Herself	Episode: "A Festa da Cuca"
2001	A Padroeira	Cecília de Sá	
2002	Festival de Desenhos	Herself	Hoster
2002	Brava Gente	Jane	Episode: "Loucos de Pedra"
2002	Os Normais	Kátia	Episode: "É Nojento, Mas é Normal"
2002	O Beijo do Vampiro	Lara	
2003	Homem Objeto	Eva	
2003	Fantástico	Reporter	Guest Star
2003	Celebridade	Darlene Sampaio	
2004	Casseta & Planeta, Urgente!	Darlene Sampaio	Cameo
2005	América	Sol de Oliveira	
2006	Dança no Gelo	Herself	Reality show of Domingão do Faustão
2006	Pé na Jaca	Elizabeth Aparecida Barra	
2006	Os Sete Pecados Capitais	Lust	
2007	Paraíso Tropical	Betina Monteiro	Cameo
2008	A Favorita	Maria do Céu / Pâmela Queiroz	
2009	Decamerão – A Comédia do Sexo	Monna	
2009	Domingo é Dia	Various characters	
2009	Ó Paí, Ó	Keila Cristina	Ep: "A Outra"
2010	As Cariocas	Alice	Ep: "A Suicida da Lapa"
2011	Insensato Coração	Natalie Lamour	
2012	Louco por Elas	Giovanna Bianchi	
2013	A Grande Família	Bianca	Cameo
2014	Boogie Oogie	Inês	
2014	A Grande Família	Herself / Maria Isabel Silva Carrara (Bebel)	Episode: "Um"
2016	Deborah Secco Apresenta	Herself	Host
2016	Malhação: Pro Dia Nascer Feliz	Tânia Souza	
2017	Segundo Sol	Karola	
2020	Bom Sucesso	Alexia Máximo	Special appearance
2020	Salve-se Quem Puder	Alexia Máximo / Josimara dos Santos	
2022	Rensga Hits!	Marlene Sampaio	
2022	Tá na Copa	Comentarist	
2023	Vai na Fé	Alexia Máximo	Special appearance
2023	Compro Likes	Maira Peterman	
2023	Codex 632	Constança Noronha	
2023	Elas por Elas	Lara Furtado Lopes Pompeu	
2025	Falas Femininas	Presenter	

=== Film ===
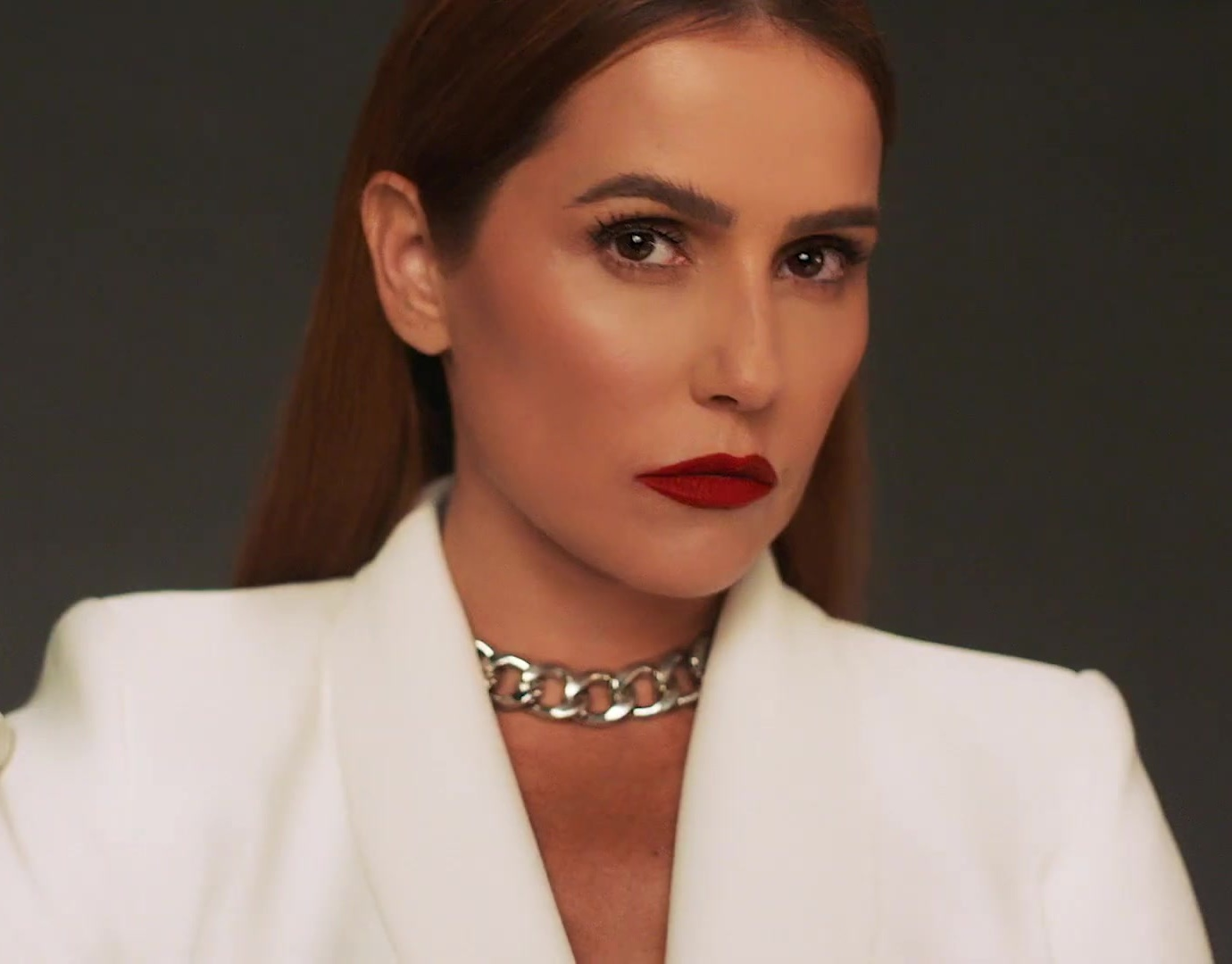
Deborah Secco (2020)

Year	Title	Role
2000	Um Anjo Trapalhão	Mayor's Daughter
2001	Caramuru - A Invenção do Brasil	Moema
2002	Xuxa e os Duendes 2 - No Caminho das Fadas	Epifânia
2003	Casseta & Planeta: A Taça do Mundo É Nossa	Stewardess
2004	A Cartomante	Rita
2004	Tudo Isso é Fado	Thaís
2004	Meu Tio Matou um Cara	Soraya
2009	Flordelis - Basta uma Palavra para Mudar	Simone
2011	Confessions of a Brazilian Call Girl	Bruna Surfistinha
2011	Assim Como Ela	América Muller
2014	Confissões de Adolescente	Felipe's mother
2014	Boa Sorte	Judite
2014	Sorria, Você Está Sendo Filmado	Doctor
2015	Entrando Numa Roubada	Laura
2018	Mulheres Alteradas	Keka
2022	Paws of Fury: The Legend Of Hank	Yuki (voice) Brazilian Dubbing

=== Videoclip ===
Year	Song	Artist
1999	"Ls Jack"	LS Jack
2015	"Somente Nela"	Paulinho Moska
2023	"POCPOC"	Pedro Sampaio

== Stage ==
Year	Title
1989	Brincando de Era uma Vez
1992	Sapatinhos Vermelhos
1993	O Soldadinho de Chumbo
1994	A Roupa Nova do Imperador
1996	Confissões de Adolescente
2001	As Lágrimas Amargas de Petra
2003	O Canto e o Encanto de ser Mulher
2006	Surto
2006	Homens, melhor não tê-los, mas se não tê-los, como sabe-los?
2010	Mais Uma Vez Amor
2017	Uma Noite Dessas

== Awards and nominations ==
Awards and nominations
Year	Awards	Category	Nominated work	Result
1992	Coca-Cola de Teatro Infantil	Actress Revelation	Sapatinhos Vermelhos	Nominated
1995	APCA Television Awards	Actress Revelation	Confissões de Adolescente	Won
2000	Press Trophy	Best Actress	Laços de Família	Nominated
2000	Internet Trophy	Best Actress	Laços de Família	Nominated
2000	Best of the Year Award	Best Supporting Actress	Laços de Família	Nominated
2000	Brazilian Art Quality Awards	Best Supporting Actress	Laços de Família	Nominated
2002	Kids Choice Awards	Beautiful of the year	O Beijo do Vampiro	Won
2003	Contigo! TV Awards	Best Supporting Actress	O Beijo do Vampiro	Nominated
2003	Press Trophy	Best Actress	O Beijo do Vampiro	Nominated
2004	Best of the Year Award	Best Supporting Actress	Celebridade	Nominated
2004	Brazilian Art Quality Awards (SP)	Best Supporting Actress	Celebridade	Nominated
2004	Brazilian Art Quality Awards (RJ)	Best Supporting Actress	Celebridade	Nominated
2004	Contigo! TV Awards	Best Supporting Actress	Celebridade	Nominated
2004	Meus Prêmios Nick	Favorite actress	Celebridade	Won
2005	Contigo! National Cinema Awards	Best Supporting Actress	Meu Tio Matou um Cara	Won
2005	Best of the Year Awards	Best actress	América	Nominated
2005	Extra Television Awards	Best actress	América	Nominated
2006	Contigo! TV Awards	Best Romantic Couple (with Caco Ciocler)	América	Nominated
2008	Natal Film and TV Festival	Best actress	A Favorita	Nominated
2009	Contigo! TV Awards	Best Supporting Actress	A Favorita	Nominated
2009	Brazilian Art Quality Awards	Best Actress in a TV Series	Decamerão – A Comédia do Sexo	Nominated
2011	Cariocas do Ano – Veja Rio	Best actress	Insensato Coração	Nominated
2011	Extra Television Awards	Best Supporting Actress	Insensato Coração	Won
2011	Prêmio Brasileiros do Ano – Isto É	Personality of the Year in Drama	Insensato Coração	Won
2011	Quem Television Awards	Best Television Actress	Insensato Coração	Nominated
2011	Best of the Year Awards	Best Supporting Actress	Insensato Coração	Nominated
2011	Meus Prêmios Nick	Beautiful of the year	Insensato Coração	Nominated
2011	Contigo! TV Awards	Best Novel Actress	Insensato Coração	Nominated
2011	Contigo! National Cinema Awards	Best National Actress	Bruna Surfistinha	Won
2011	Contigo! National Cinema Awards(Júri Técnico)	Best National Actress	Bruna Surfistinha	Won
2012	SESC Film Festival	Best Actress	Bruna Surfistinha	Won
2012	Grande Prêmio Brasileiro de Cinema	Best Actress	Bruna Surfistinha	Won
2012	ACIE Cinema Awards	Best Actress	Bruna Surfistinha	Won
2013	Contigo! TV Awards	Best Actress in a Series or Miniseries	Louco por Elas	Nominated
2014	Cine Ceará (Troféu Eusélio Oliveira)	Tribute	Film career	Won
2014	Extra Television Awards	Best National Actress	Boogie Oogie	Nominated
2014	Quem Cinema Awards	Best Actress	Boa Sorte	Won
2015	APCA Cinema Awards	Best Actress	Boa Sorte	Won
2015	Fiesp/Sesi-SP Cinema Awards	Best Actress	Boa Sorte	Nominated
2015	Grande Prêmio Brasileiro de Cinema	Best Actress	Boa Sorte	Nominated
