= The Aspones =

- Genre: Sitcom
- Created by: Fernanda Young; Alexandre Machado
- Starring: Selton Mello; Andréa Beltrão; Pedro Paulo Rangel; Marisa Orth; Drica Moraes
- Opening theme: "Coração de Papel" by Taryn Szpilman
- Country of origin: Brazil
- Original language: Portuguese
- No. of episodes: 7

Production
- Producer: José Alvarenga Jr.
- Running time: 24 minutes
- Production company: Ta Rio Filme

Original release
- Network: Rede Globo
- Release: November 5 – December 17, 2004

The Aspones (Portuguese: Os Aspones) is a Brazilian television sitcom that aired on Rede Globo from November 5 to December 17, 2004. It was created by Fernanda Young and Alexandre Machado. The series, which portrayed a group of white-collar workers at a governmental department lost in Brazilian bureaucracy in Brasília which actually has no function at all, starred Selton Mello, Andréa Beltrão, Pedro Paulo Rangel, Marisa Orth and Drica Moraes. The show's title is a Portuguese blend word formed from the phrase "assessor de porra [or porcaria] nenhuma" (lit. 'legal advisor of nothing').

== Synopsis ==
The series begins as Leda Maria ( Andréa Beltrão ) is hired to be Tales' ( Selton Mello ) assistant, while training Leda Maria, Tales catches his boss red-handed with top secret documents. Tales' boss dismisses it all as a test and "promotes" Tales to the chief of FMDO, which we soon find out is a part of the bureaucratic machine that became obsolete and unnecessary with time, and Tales, who is implied to be neurodivergent, gladly goes with it and takes his new assistant with him. The series then explores the daily life of a brazilian public worker and office workplace relationship in an exaggerated optic. After episode 3, they repurpose their obsolete office and jobs into getting petty revenge on people who misbehaved such as people who committed tax fraud, flashers and ex-lovers of some of the characters. As is commonplace with Fernanda Young's works, the it includes many nitpicks on daily life situations buried under a large amount of erotica humor.

== Cast and characters ==
- Selton Mello as Tales
- Andréa Beltrão as Leda Maria
- Pedro Paulo Rangel as Caio
- Marisa Orth as Anete
- Drica Moraes as Moira
