= APCA Television Award =

Brazilian award

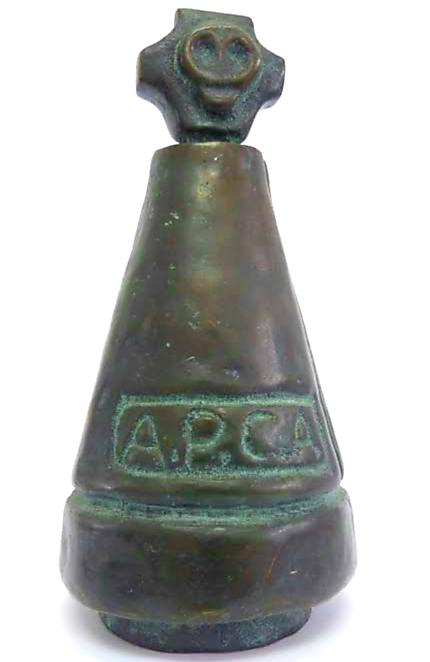
- APCA Award statuette.
- Awarded for: Excellence in Brazilian television drama.
- Sponsored by: APCA
- Country: Brazil
- First award: 1972

The APCA Television Award (Portuguese: Prêmio APCA de Televisão) is one of the areas covered by the APCA Award, a traditional Brazilian award created in 1956 by the São Paulo Association of Theater Critics (now the São Paulo Association of Art Critics). Television became part of the APCA Awards in 1972. Until then, it only awarded theater and classical music. In the same year, film, literature and popular music were also recognized. New areas were incorporated into the competition over the following years.

The winners of the APCA Award are chosen between the end of November and the beginning of December during a meeting of APCA member critics. Some categories may include a six-monthly pre-selection of finalists according to demand. Each critic votes exclusively within their area of expertise, selecting a maximum of seven categories in each area, which may change each year according to the critics' perception of the most pertinent in each period. There is also a requirement that a minimum of three critics from each area be present at the vote, which can mean that certain categories are not awarded in some years due to a lack of quorum. In 2020, due to the COVID-19 pandemic, the winners of the 65th edition of the APCA Awards were determined in January 2021. Each area had fewer categories than in previous years. The television area had six categories instead of seven, while in most areas the reduction was to three categories.

== Main categories ==
- APCA Award for Best Telenovela;
- APCA Award for Best Television Actress;
- APCA Award for Best Television Actor;
- APCA Award for Best Breakthrough Actor;
- APCA Award for Best Breakthrough Actress;
- APCA Award for Best Supporting Actor;
- APCA Award for Best Supporting Actress.

== Winners by Year ==
=== 1970s ===
==== 1972 ====
Category	Winner	Program
Best Comedy Show	Dom Camilo e os Cabeludos	
Best Director	Walter Avancini	Selva de Pedra
Best Screenwriter	Dias Gomes	Selva de Pedra
Best Actor	Paulo Gracindo	Bandeira 2
Best Actress	Dina Sfat	Selva de Pedra

==== 1973 ====
Category	Winner	Program
Best Telenovela	O Bem-Amado	
Best Actor	Gianfrancesco Guarnieiri	Mulheres de Areia
Best Actor	Paulo Gracindo	O Bem-Amado
Best Actress	Eva Wilma	Mulheres de Areia
Best Actress	Lélia Abramo	Uma Rosa com Amor

==== 1974 ====
Category	Winner	Program
Best Telenovela	O Espigão	
Best Telenovela	Os Inocentes	
Best Telenovela	Os Ossos do Barão	
Best Actor	Antônio Fagundes	O Machão
Best Actor	João José Pompeo	O Machão
Best Actor	Cláudio Corrêa e Castro	Os Inocentes
Best Actress	Betty Faria	O Espigão
Best Actress	Susana Vieira	O Espigão
Best Actress	Cleyde Yáconis	Os Inocentes
Best Actress	Elza Gomes	Os Ossos do Barão
Best Actress	Neuza Amaral	Os Ossos do Barão

==== 1975 ====
Category	Winner	Program
Critics' Grand Prix	Gabriela	
Best Actor	Rolando Boldrin	A Viagem
Best Actor	Tarcísio Meira	Escalada
Best Actress	Eva Wilma	A Viagem
Best Actress	Irena Ravache	Escalada
Best Actress	Susana Vieira	Escalada
Breakthrough Actor	Jaime Barcelos	Gabriela
Breakthrough Actress	Elizabeth Savalla	Gabriela

==== 1976 ====
Category	Winner	Program
Critics' Grand Prix	Lauro César Muniz	O Casarão
Best Director	Daniel Filho	Pecado Capital
Best Actor	Lima Duarte	Pecado Capital
Best Actor	Mário Lago	O Casarão
Best Actress	Betty Faria	Pecado Capital
Best Actress	Laura Cardoso	Os Apóstolos de Judas
Best Actress	Renata Sorrah	O Casarão
Best Actress	Yara Côrtes	O Casarão
Breakthrough Actress	Kate Hansen	Os Apóstolos de Judas
Breakthrough Actress	Pepita Rodrigues	Anjo Mau
Breakthrough Screenwriter	Renata Pallotini	O Julgamento

==== 1977 ====
Category	Winner	Program
Best Telenovela	Espelho Mágico	
Best Telenovela Theme	O Profeta	
Best Screenwriter	Walter George Durst	Nina
Best Actor	Antônio Fagundes	Nina
Best Actor	Carlos Augusto Strazzer	O Profeta
Best Actor	Lima Duarte	Espelho Mágico
Best Actor	Mário Lago	Nina
Best Actress	Nicette Bruno	Éramos Seis
Best Actress	Rosamaria Murtinho	Nina
Breakthrough Actress	Lídia Brondi	Espelho Mágico

==== 1978 ====
Category	Winner	Program
Best Telenovela	Sinal de Alerta	
Best Telenovela Theme	Aritana	
Best TV Show	Cidanda Cirandinha	
Best Actor	Carlos Alberto Riccelli	Aritana
Best Actor	Jaime Barcelos	Aritana
Best Actress	Cleyde Yáconis	Aritana
Best Actress	Gracinda Freire	Dancin' Days
Best Actress	Joana Fomm	Dancin' Days
Best Actress	Yara Amaral	Dancin' Days
Breakthrough Actor	Eduardo Conde	Sinal de Alerta
Breakthrough Actor	Lauro Corona	Dancin' Days
Breakthrough Actress	Glória Pires	Dancin' Days

==== 1979 ====
Category	Winner	Program
Best Telenovela	Cabocla	
Best Series	Malu Mulher	
Best Screenwriter	Jorge Andrade	Gaivotas
Best Actor	Paulo Autran	Pai Herói
Best Actor	Roberto Bonfim	Cabocla
Best Actor	Rubens de Falco	Gaivotas
Best Actress	Cleyde Yáconis	Gaivotas
Best Actress	Fernanda Montenegro	Cara a Cara
Best Actress	Nicete Bruno	Como Salvar Meu Casamento
Best Actress	Regina Duarte	Malu Mulher
Breakthrough Actor	José Dumont	Plantão de Polícia
Breakthrough Actress	Narjara Turetta	Malu Mulher

=== 1980s ===
==== 1980 ====
Category	Winner	Program
Best Series	O Bem-Amado	
Best Actor	Jardel Filho	Coração Alado
Best Actor	Stênio Garcia	Carga Pesada
Best Actress	Dercy Gonçalves	Cavalo Amarelo
Best Actress	Regina Duarte	Malu Mulher
Best Actress	Tônia Carrero	Água Viva

==== 1981 ====
Category	Winner	Program
Best Telenovela	Os Imigrantes	
Best Series	O Bem-Amado	
Best Screenwriter	Benedito Ruy Barbosa	Os Imigrantes
Best Director	Atílio Riccó	
Best Director	Nilton Travesso	TV Mulher
Best Actor	Fernando Torres	Baila Comigo
Best Actor	Tony Ramos	Baila Comigo
Best Actor	Rubens de Falco	Os Imigrantes
Best Actress	Fernanda Montenegro	Brilhante
Best Actress	Kate Hansen	Brilhante
Breakthrough Actor	Flávio Guarnieri	Os Adolescentes
Breakthrough Actor	Ulisses Bezerra	Os Imigrantes
Breakthrough Actress	Maitê Proença	As Três Marias

==== 1982 ====
Category	Winner	Program
Best Telenovela	Elas por Elas	
Best Screenwriter	Cassiano Gabus Mendes	Elas por Elas
Best Actor	Luís Carlos Arutin	Os Imigrantes
Best Actor	Luiz Gustavo	Elas por Elas
Best Actor	Reginaldo Faria	Elas por Elas
Best Actor	Roberto Bonfim	Paraíso
Best Actress	Cleyde Yáconis	Ninho da Serpente
Best Actress	Irene Ravache	Sol de Verão
Best Actress	Marilia Pêra	Quem Ama Não Mata
Best Actress	Tânia Alves	Lampião e Maria Bonita
Breakthrough Actor	Aguinaldo Silva	Lampião e Maria Bonita
Breakthrough Actor	Doc Comparato	Lampião e Maria Bonita
Breakthrough Actress	Débora Bloch	Sol de Verão

==== 1983 ====
Category	Winner	Program
Critics' Grand Prix	O Bem-Amado	
Best Telenovela	Guerra dos Sexos	
Best Series	Bandidos da Falange	
Best Screenwriter	Sílvio de Abreu	Guerra dos Sexos
Best Director	Jorge Fernando	Guerra dos Sexos
Best Director	Guel Arraes	Guerra dos Sexos
Best Actor	Mário Gomes	Guerra dos Sexos
Best Actor	Paulo Autran	Guerra dos Sexos
Best Actor	Stênio Garcia	Bandidos da Falange
Best Actress	Fernanda Montenegro	Guerra dos Sexos
Best Actress	Yara Amaral	Guerra dos Sexos
Breakthrough Actor	José Mayer	Bandidos da Falange

==== 1984 ====
Category	Winner	Program
Critics' Grand Prix	Rabo de Saia	
Best Telenovela	Verera Tropical	
Best Series	Santa Marta Fabril	
Best Screenwriter	Carlos Lombardi	Vereda Tropical
Best Screenwriter	Sílvio de Abreu	Vereda Tropical
Best Director	Jorge Fernando	Vereda Tropical
Best Director	Guel Arraes	Vereda Tropical
Best Director	Walter Avancini	Rabo de Saia
Best Actor	Ary Fontoura	Amor com Amor se Paga
Best Actor	Ney Latorraca	Rabo de Saia
Best Actor	Nuno Leal Maia	Vereda Tropical
Best Actress	Débora Duarte	Anarquistas
Best Actress	Geórgia Gomide	Vereda Tropical
Best Actress	Marieta Severo	Vereda Tropical
Best Actress	Lucinha Lins	Rabo de Saia
Best Actress	Miriam Pires	Meus Filhos, Minha Vida
Best Actress	Nathalia Timberg	Santa Marta Fabril
Breakthrough Actor	Marcos Frota	Vereda Tropical
Breakthrough Actress	Dora Pelegrino	Livre Para Voar

==== 1985 ====
Category	Winner	Program
Best Telenovela	Roque Santeiro	
Best Screenwriter	Dias Gomes	Roque Santeiro
Best Screenwriter	Aguinaldo Silva	Roque Santeiro
Best Actor	Lima Duarte	Roque Santeiro
Best Actress	Regina Duarte	Roque Santeiro
Breakthrough Actress	Cláudia Raia	Roque Santeiro

==== 1987 ====
Category	Winner	Program
Best Telenovela	Corpo Santo	
Best Screenwriter	José Louzeiro	Corpo Santo
Best Director	Jayme Monjardim	Direito de Amar
Best Actor	Carlos Vereza	Direito de Amar
Best Actress	Marilia Pêra	Brega e Chique
Supporting Actor	Sérgio Viotti	Corpo Santo
Supporting Actress	Ângela Vieira	Corpo Santo
Breakthrough Actor	Chico Diaz	Corpo Santo
Breakthrough Actress	Giulia Gam	Mandala

==== 1988 ====
Category	Winner	Program
Critics' Grand Prix	O Primo Basílio	
Best Telenovela	Vale Tudo	
Best Director	Daniel Filho	O Primo Basílio
Best Actor	José Mayer	O Pagador de Promessas
Best Actress	Glória Pires	Vale Tudo
Supporting Actor	Sérgio Mamberti	Vale Tudo
Supporting Actress	Louise Cardoso	O Primo Basílio
Breakthrough Actor	Paulo Reis	Vale tudo

==== 1989 ====
Category	Winner	Program
Best Telenovela	Que Rei Sou Eu?	
Best Series	O Cometa	
Best Set Design	Kananga do Japão	
Best Costumes	Que Rei Sou Eu?	
Best Costumes	Kananga do Japão	
Best Soundtrack	Kananga do Japão	
Best Opening	Kananga do Japão	
Best Screenwriter	Cassiano Gabus Mendes	Que Rei Sou Eu?
Best Director	Tizuka Yamasaki	Kananga do Japão
Supporting Actor	Jorge Dória	Que Rei Sou Eu?
Supporting Actress	Suzana Faini	Vida Nova
Breakthrough Actor	Marcos Winter	Vida Nova
Breakthrough Actress	Cristiana Oliveira	Kananga do Japão

=== 1990s ===
==== 1990 ====
Category	Winner	Program
Best Telenovela	Pantanal	
Best Children's Show	Rá Tim Bum	
Best Director	Jayme Monjardim	Pantanal
Best Actor	Cláudio Marzo	Pantanal
Best Actress	Jussara Freire	Pantanal
Breakthrough Actor	Ângelo Antônio	Pantanal
Breakthrough Actress	Marisa Orth	Rainha da Sucata

==== 1991 ====
Category	Winner	Program
Best Telenovela	Vamp	
Best Children's Show	Mundo da Lua	
Best Actor	Otávio Augusto	Vamp
Best Actress	Glória Pires	O Dono do Mundo
Supporting Actor	Cláudio Corrêa e Casro	O Dono do Mundo
Supporting Actress	Ângela Leal	A História de Ana Raio e Zé Trovão
Breakthrough Actor	Flávio Silvino	Vamp

==== 1992 ====
Category	Winner	Program
Critics' Grand Prix	Anos Rebeldes	
Best Actor	Armango Bógus	Pedra Sobre Pedra
Best Actress	Cláudia Abreu	Anos Rebeldes
Supporting Actor	Jorge Dória	Deus Nos Acuda
Supporting Actress	Neusa Borges	De Corpo e Alma

==== 1993 ====
Category	Winner	Program
Best Telenovela	Renascer	
Best Actor	Antônio Fagundes	Renascer
Best Actress	Glória Pires	Mulheres de Areia
Supporting Actor	Osmar Prado	Renascer
Supporting Actress	Regina Dourado	Renascer
Breakthrough Actor	Jackson Antunes	Renascer

==== 1994 ====
Category	Winner	Program
Critics' Grand Prix	Memorial de Maria Moura	
Best Telenovela	Éramos Seis	
Best Children's Show	Castelo Rá-Tim-Bum	
Best Actor	José Wilker	Fera Ferida
Best Actress	Irene Ravache	Éramos Seis
Supporting Actor	Tarcísio Filho	Éramos Seis
Supporting Actress	Marieta Severo	Pátria Minha
Supporting Actress	Zezé Polessa	Memorial de Maria Moura
Breakthrough Actor	Murilo Benício	Fera Ferida
Breakthrough Actress	Deborah Secco	Confissões de Adolescente

==== 1995 ====
Category	Winner	Program
Critics' Grand Prix	A Comédia da Vida Privada	
Best Telenovela	A Próxima Vítima	
Best Director	Denise Saraceni	Engraçadinha
Best Actor	Edson Celulari	Decadência
Best Actress	Aracy Balabanian	A Próxima Vítima
Best Actress	Laura Cardoso	Irmãos Coragem
Supporting Actor	Flávio Migliaccio	A Próxima Vítima
Supporting Actress	Rosi Campos	Cara & Coroa
Breakthrough Actor	Luís Melo	Cara & Coroa
Breakthrough Actress	Alessandra Negrini	Engraçadinha

==== 1996 ====
Category	Winner	Program
Special Award	Tarcísio Meira	O Rei do Gado
Best Telenovela	Salsa e Merengue	
Best Children's Show	Cocoricó	
Best Director	Daniel Filho	A Vida Como Ela É...
Best Actor	Raul Cortez	O Rei do Gado
Best Actress	Arlete Salles	Salsa e Merengue
Best Actress	Drica Moraes	Xica da Silva
Supporting Actor	Leonardo Brício	O Rei do Gado
Supporting Actress	Walderez de Barros	O Rei do Gado
Breakthrough Actor	Caco Ciocler	O Rei do Gado
Breakthrough Actress	Tereza Sequerra	Xica da Silva

==== 1997 ====
Category	Winner	Program
Best Telenovela	Por Amor	
Best Children's Show	Agente G	
Best Director	Daniel Filho	A Justiceira
Best Actor	Ary Fontoura	A Indomada
Best Actress	Eva Wilma	A Indomada
Supporting Actor	Mauro Mendonça	Anjo Mau
Supporting Actress	Ana Lúcia Torre	A Indomada
Breakthrough Actress	Cecília Dassi	Por Amor

==== 1998 ====
Category	Winner	Program
Best Production	Hilda Furação	
Best Children's Show	Vila Esperança	
Best TV Show	Mulher	
Best Director	Wolf Maya	Hilda Furacão
Best Actor	Tony Ramos	Torre de Babel
Best Actress	Adriana Esteves	Torre de Babel
Supporting Actor	Rogério Cardoso	Hilda Furação
Supporting Actor	Cleyde Yáconis	Torre de Babel
Breakthrough Actor	Matheus Nachtergaele	Hilda Furação

==== 1999 ====
Category	Winner	Program
Critics' Grand Prix	O Auto da Compadecida	
Best Telenovela	Terra Nostra	
Best Actor	Matheus Nachtergaele	O Auto da Compadecida
Best Actress	Débora Duarte	Terra Nostra
Breakthrough Actress	Lu Grimaldi	Terra Nostra

=== 2000s ===
==== 2000 ====
Category	Winner	Program
Critics' Grand Prix	A Muralha	
Best Actor	Tarcísio Meira	A Muralha
Best Actress	Marieta Severo	Laços de Família
Breakthrough Actress	Júlia Feldens	Laços de Família

==== 2001 ====
Category	Winner	Program
Critics' Grand Prix	Brava Gente	
Best TV show	Os Normais	
Best Actor	Tony Ramos	As Filhas da Mãe
Best Actress	Christiane Torloni	Um Anjo Caiu do Céu

==== 2002 ====
Category	Winner	Program
Critics' Grand Prix	Cidade dos Homens	
Best Comedy Show	A Grande Família	
Best Actor	Marco Nanini	A Grande Família
Best Actress	Eliane Giardini	O Clone
Breakthrough Actress	Sthefany Brito	O Clone

==== 2003 ====
Category	Winner	Program
Critics' Grand Prix	A Casa das Sete Mulheres	
Best TV show	Cena Aberta	
Best Actor	Dan Stulbach	Mulheres Apaixonadas
Best Actress	Nívea Maria	A Casa das Sete Mulheres

==== 2004 ====
Category	Winner	Program
Best Telenovela	Celebridade	
Best TV Adaptation	Contos da Meia-Noite	
Best Actor	Tony Ramos	Cabocla
Best Actress	Renata Sorrah	Senhora do Destino
Breakthrough Actor	João Emanuel Carneiro	Da Cor do Pecado
Best Comedian	Cláudia Rodrigues	A Diarista

==== 2005 ====
Category	Winner	Program
Critics' Grand Prix	Hoje é Dia de Maria	
Best Actor	Fúlvio Stefanini	Alma Gêmea
Best Actress	Fernanda Montenegro	Belíssima
Breakthrough Actor	Tiago Santiago	A Escrava Isaura
Breakthrough Actor	Tiago Santiago	Prova de Amor

==== 2006 ====
Category	Winner	Program
Critics' Grand Prix	Os Filhos do Carnaval	
Best Actor	Lázaro Ramos	Cobras & Lagartos
Best Actress	Lília Cabral	Páginas da Vida
Best Comedian	Dira Paes	A Diarista

==== 2007 ====
Category	Winner	Program
Best Telenovela	Paraíso Tropical	
Best Actor	Marcelo Serrado	Vidas Opostas
Best Actor	Marcelo Serrado	Mandrake
Best Actor	Wagner Moura	Paraíso Tropical
Best Actress	Camila Pitanga	Paraíso Tropical
Best Actress	Jussara Freire	Vidas Opostas

==== 2008 ====
Category	Winner	Program
Best Series	9mm: São Paulo	
Best Screenwriter	João Emanuel Carneiro	A Favorita
Best Actor	Guilherme Weber	Queridos Amigos
Best Actress	Patrícia Pillar	A Favorita

==== 2009 ====
Category	Winner	Program
Critics' Grand Prix	Maysa, Quando Fala o Coração	
Best Series	Som & Fúria	
Best Actor	Felipe Camargo	Som & Fúria
Best Actress	Larissa Maciel	Maysa, Quando Fala o Coração

=== 2010s ===
==== 2010 ====
Category	Winner	Program
Best Series	A Cura	
Best Actor	Murilo Benício	Ti Ti Ti
Best Actor	Murilo Benício	Força Tarefa
Best Actress	Irene Ravache	Passione

==== 2011 ====
Category	Winner	Program
Best Telenovela	Cordel Encantado	
Best TV Show	Chegadas e Partidas	
Best Series	Tapas & Beijos	
Best Children's Show	Julie e os Fantasmas	
Best Actor	Gabriel Braga Nunes	Insensato Coração
Best Actress	Gloria Pires	Insensato Coração
Breakthrough Actress	Elisa Volpatto	Mulher de Fases

==== 2012 ====
Category	Winner	Program
Critics' Grand Prix	Avenida Brasil	
Best Series	(fdp)	
Best Comedy Show	Porta dos Fundos	
Best Actor	José de Abreu	Avenida Brasil
Best Actress	Adriana Esteves	Avenida Brasil
Breakthrough Actor	Filipe Miguez	Cheias de Charme
Breakthrough Actress	Izabel de Oliveira	Cheias de Charme
Best Comedian	Marcelo Adnet	

==== 2013 ====
Category	Winner	Program
Best Variety Show	Amor & Sexo	
Best Series	Latitudes	
Best Children's Show	Historietas Assombradas	
Best Journalistic/Documentary Show	Presidentes Africanos	
Honorable Mention	Sai de Baixo	
Best Director	Felipe Hirsch	A Menina Sem Qualidades
Best Actor	Mateus Solano	Amor à Vida
Best Actress	Bianca Comparato	A Menina Sem Qualidades
Best Actress	Elizabeth Savala	Amor à Vida

==== 2014 ====
Category	Winner	Program
Best Variety Show	O Infiltrado	
Best Series	Amores Roubados	
Best Comedy Show	Tá no Ar: a TV na TV	
Best Children's Show	Quintal da Cultura	
Honorable Mention	A Grande Família	
Best Actor	Irandhir Santos	Meu Pedacinho de Chão
Best Actress	Cássia Kiss	Amores Roubados
Best Actress	Cássia Kiss	O Rebu

==== 2015 ====
Category	Nominees	Winner
Critics' Grand Prix	Sílvio Santos	
Honorable Mention	Mulheres	
Best Telenovela	Verdades Secretas (TV Globo)	Verdades Secretas (TV Globo)
Best Telenovela	Além do Tempo (TV Globo)	Verdades Secretas (TV Globo)
Best Telenovela	I Love Paraisópolis (TV Globo)	Verdades Secretas (TV Globo)
Best Telenovela	Os Dez Mandamentos (Record)	Verdades Secretas (TV Globo)
Best Telenovela	Sete Vidas (TV Globo)	Verdades Secretas (TV Globo)
Best Series	Os Experientes (TV Globo)	Os Experientes (TV Globo)
Best Series	Amorteamo (TV Globo)	Os Experientes (TV Globo)
Best Series	Felizes para Sempre? (TV Globo)	Os Experientes (TV Globo)
Best Series	Magnífica 70 (HBO Brazil)	Os Experientes (TV Globo)
Best Series	Pé na Cova (TV Globo)	Os Experientes (TV Globo)
Best TV Show	Masterchef (Bandeirantes)	Masterchef (Bandeirantes)
Best TV Show	Lucky Ladies (Star Life)	Masterchef (Bandeirantes)
Best TV Show	Que Monstro te Mordeu? (TV Cultura)	Masterchef (Bandeirantes)
Best TV Show	Todas as Manhãs do Mundo (Nat Geo)	Masterchef (Bandeirantes)
Best TV Show	Zorra (TV Globo)	Masterchef (Bandeirantes)
Best Director	Mauro Mendonça Filho for Verdades Secretas (TV Globo)	Mauro Mendonça Filho for Verdades Secretas (TV Globo)
Best Director	Cláudio Torres for Magnífica 70 (HBO Brazil)	Mauro Mendonça Filho for Verdades Secretas (TV Globo)
Best Director	Fernando Meirelles for Os Experientes (TV Globo)	Mauro Mendonça Filho for Verdades Secretas (TV Globo)
Best Director	Jayme Monjardim for Sete Vidas (TV Globo)	Mauro Mendonça Filho for Verdades Secretas (TV Globo)
Best Director	Rogério Gomes for Além do Tempo (TV Globo)	Mauro Mendonça Filho for Verdades Secretas (TV Globo)
Best Actress	Grazi Massafera for Verdades Secretas (TV Globo)	Grazi Massafera for Verdades Secretas (TV Globo)
Best Actress	Drica Moraes for Verdades Secretas (TV Globo)	Grazi Massafera for Verdades Secretas (TV Globo)
Best Actress	Irene Ravache for Além do Tempo (TV Globo)	Grazi Massafera for Verdades Secretas (TV Globo)
Best Actress	Marieta Severo for Verdades Secretas (TV Globo)	Grazi Massafera for Verdades Secretas (TV Globo)
Best Actress	Simone Spoladore for Magnífica 70 (HBO Brazil)	Grazi Massafera for Verdades Secretas (TV Globo)
Best Actor	Alexandre Nero for A Regra do Jogo (TV Globo)	Alexandre Nero for A Regra do Jogo (TV Globo)
Best Actor	Domingos Montagner for Sete Vidas (TV Globo)	Alexandre Nero for A Regra do Jogo (TV Globo)
Best Actor	Juca de Oliveira for Os Experientes (TV Globo)	Alexandre Nero for A Regra do Jogo (TV Globo)
Best Actor	Rafael Cardoso for Além do Tempo (TV Globo)	Alexandre Nero for A Regra do Jogo (TV Globo)
Best Actor	Tony Ramos for A Regra do Jogo (TV Globo)	Alexandre Nero for A Regra do Jogo (TV Globo)
Best Host	Mônica Iozzi for Vídeo Show (TV Globo)	Môniza Iozzi for Vídeo Show (TV Globo)
Best Host	Dan Stulbach for Custe o Que Custar (Bandeirantes)	Môniza Iozzi for Vídeo Show (TV Globo)
Best Host	Fátima Bernardes for Encontro com Fátima Bernardes (TV Globo)	Môniza Iozzi for Vídeo Show (TV Globo)
Best Host	Mariana Godoy for Mariana Godoy Entrevista (RedeTV)	Môniza Iozzi for Vídeo Show (TV Globo)
Best Host	Sarah Oliveira for Calada Noite (GNT)	Môniza Iozzi for Vídeo Show (TV Globo)

Voting: Bárbara Sacchitiello, Edianez Parente, Fabio Maksymczuk, Flávio Ricco, José Armando Vanucci, Leão Lobo, Neuber Fischer and Nilson Xavier.

==== 2016 ====
Category	Nominees	Winner
Critics' Grand Prix	Domingos Montagner (in memoriam)	
Best Telenovela	Velho Chico (TV Globo)	Velho Chico (TV Globo)
Best Telenovela	Escrava Mãe (TV Globo)	Velho Chico (TV Globo)
Best Telenovela	Êta Mundo Bom (TV Globo)	Velho Chico (TV Globo)
Best Telenovela	Liberdade, Liberdade (TV Globo)	Velho Chico (TV Globo)
Best Telenovela	Totalmente Demais (TV Globo)	Velho Chico (TV Globo)
Best Series	Justiça (TV Globo)	Justiça (TV Globo)
Best Series	Ligações Perigosas (TV Globo)	Justiça (TV Globo)
Best Series	Me Chama de Bruna (Fox Brazil)	Justiça (TV Globo)
Best Series	Supermax (TV Globo)	Justiça (TV Globo)
Best Series	A Garota da Moto (SBT)	Justiça (TV Globo)
Best Children's Show	Detetives do Prédio Azul - D.P.A. (Gloob)	Detetives do Prédio Azul (Gloob)
Best Children's Show	Cúmplices de um Resgate (SBT)	Detetives do Prédio Azul (Gloob)
Best Children's Show	Galinha Pintadinha	Detetives do Prédio Azul (Gloob)
Best Children's Show	O Irmão do Jorel (Cartoon Network)	Detetives do Prédio Azul (Gloob)
Best Children's Show	Show da Luna (Discovery Kids	Detetives do Prédio Azul (Gloob)
2016 Summer Olympics coverage	SportTV	SporTV
2016 Summer Olympics coverage	ESPN Brazil	SporTV
2016 Summer Olympics coverage	Fox Sports	SporTV
2016 Summer Olympics coverage	TV Globo	SporTV
2016 Summer Olympics coverage	Rede Bandeirantes	SporTV
Best Director	Luiz Fernando Carvalho for Justiça (TV Globo)	Luiz Fernando Carvalho for Justiça (TV Globo)
Best Director	Breno Silveira for 1 Contra Todos (Fox Brazil)	Luiz Fernando Carvalho for Justiça (TV Globo)
Best Director	José Alvarenga Júnior for Supermax (TV Globo)	Luiz Fernando Carvalho for Justiça (TV Globo)
Best Director	Luiz Fernando Carvalho for Velho Chico (TV Globo)	Luiz Fernando Carvalho for Justiça (TV Globo)
Best Director	Vinícuis Coimbra for Liberdade, Liberdade (TV Globo)	Luiz Fernando Carvalho for Justiça (TV Globo)
Best Actress	Selma Egrei for Velho Chico (TV Globo)	Selma Egrei for Velho Chico (TV Globo)
Best Actress	Adriana Esteves for Justiça (TV Globo)	Selma Egrei for Velho Chico (TV Globo)
Best Actress	Débora Bloch for Justiça (TV Globo)	Selma Egrei for Velho Chico (TV Globo)
Best Actress	Lucy Alves for Velho Chico (TV Globo)	Selma Egrei for Velho Chico (TV Globo)
Best Actress	Fabíula Nascimento for Velho Chico (TV Globo)	Selma Egrei for Velho Chico (TV Globo)
Best Actor	Marco Ricca for Liberdade, Liberdade (TV Globo)	Marco Ricca for Liberdade, Liberdade (TV Globo)
Best Actor	Chico Diaz for Velho Chico (TV Globo)	Marco Ricca for Liberdade, Liberdade (TV Globo)
Best Actor	Enrique Diaz for Justiça (TV Globo)	Marco Ricca for Liberdade, Liberdade (TV Globo)
Best Actor	Rodrigo Santoro for Velho Chico (TV Globo)	Marco Ricca for Liberdade, Liberdade (TV Globo)
Best Actor	Sergio Guizé for Êta Mundo Bom (TV Globo)	Marco Ricca for Liberdade, Liberdade (TV Globo)

Voting: Bárbara Sacchitiello, Cristina Padiglione, Edianez Parente, Fábio Maksymczuk, Flávio Ricco, José Armando Vanucci, Neuber Fischer, Leão Lobo, Nilson Xavier and Paulo Gustavo Pereira.

==== 2017 ====
Category	Nominees	Winner
Best Telenovela	A Força do Querer (TV Globo)	A Força do Querer (TV Globo)
Best Telenovela	Os Dias Eram Assim (TV Globo)	A Força do Querer (TV Globo)
Best Telenovela	Malhação: Viva a Diferença (TV Globo)	A Força do Querer (TV Globo)
Best Telenovela	Novo Mundo (TV Globo)	A Força do Querer (TV Globo)
Best Telenovela	Rock Story (TV Globo)	A Força do Querer (TV Globo)
Best Series	3% (Netflix)	3% (Netflix)
Best Series	Dois Irmãos (TV Globo)	3% (Netflix)
Best Series	Filhos da Pátria (TV Globo)	3% (Netflix)
Best Series	Sob Pressão (TV Globo)	3% (Netflix)
Best Series	1 Contra Todos (TV Globo)	3% (Netflix)
Best TV Show	Terra Dois (TV Cultura)	Terra Dois (TV Cultura)
Best TV Show	Bipolar Show (Canal Brasil)	Terra Dois (TV Cultura)
Best TV Show	Estudio I (GloboNews)	Terra Dois (TV Cultura)
Best TV Show	Papo de Segunda (GNT)	Terra Dois (TV Cultura)
Best TV Show	Profissão Repórter (TV Globo)	Terra Dois (TV Cultura)
Best Director	Luiz Fernando Carvalho for Dois Irmãos (TV Globo)	Luiz Fernando Carvalho for Dois Irmãos (TV Globo)
Best Director	Andrucha Waddington and Mini Kerti for Sob Pressão (TV Globo)	Luiz Fernando Carvalho for Dois Irmãos (TV Globo)
Best Director	Maria de Médicis and Dennis Carvalho for Rock Story (TV Globo)	Luiz Fernando Carvalho for Dois Irmãos (TV Globo)
Best Director	Rogério Gomes and Pedro Vasconcelos for A Força do Querer (TV Globo)	Luiz Fernando Carvalho for Dois Irmãos (TV Globo)
Best Director	Vinicius Coimbra for Novo Mundo (TV Globo)	Luiz Fernando Carvalho for Dois Irmãos (TV Globo)
Best Actress	Juliana Paes for A Força do Querer and Dois Irmãos (TV Globo)	Juliana Paes for A Força do Querer and Dois Irmãos (TV Globo)
Best Actress	Carol Duarte for A Força do Querer (TV Globo)	Juliana Paes for A Força do Querer and Dois Irmãos (TV Globo)
Best Actress	Elizângela for A Força do Querer (TV Globo)	Juliana Paes for A Força do Querer and Dois Irmãos (TV Globo)
Best Actress	Marjorie Estiano for Sob Pressão (TV Globo)	Juliana Paes for A Força do Querer and Dois Irmãos (TV Globo)
Best Actress	Paolla Oliveira for A Força do Querer (TV Globo)	Juliana Paes for A Força do Querer and Dois Irmãos (TV Globo)
Best Actor	Júlio Andrade for Sob Pressão (TV Globo)	Júlio Andrade for Sob Pressão (TV Globo)
Best Actor	Daniel de Oliveira for Os Dias Eram assim (TV Globo)	Júlio Andrade for Sob Pressão (TV Globo)
Best Actor	Marco Ricca for Os Dias Eram assim (TV Globo)	Júlio Andrade for Sob Pressão (TV Globo)
Best Actor	Tonico Pereira for A Força do Querer (TV Globo)	Júlio Andrade for Sob Pressão (TV Globo)
Best Actor	Tony Ramos for Vade Retro (TV Globo)	Júlio Andrade for Sob Pressão (TV Globo)
Best Host	Tatá Werneck for Lady Night (Multishow)	Tatá Werneck for Lady Night (Multishow)
Best Host	Fábio Porchat for Programa do Porchat (Record)	Tatá Werneck for Lady Night (Multishow)
Best Host	Pedro Bial for Conversa com Bial (TV Globo)	Tatá Werneck for Lady Night (Multishow)
Best Host	Fátima Bernardes for Encontro com Fátima Bernardes (TV Globo)	Tatá Werneck for Lady Night (Multishow)
Best Host	Fernanda Lima for Popstar and Amor & Sexo (TV Globo)	Tatá Werneck for Lady Night (Multishow)

Voting: Cristina Padiglione, Edianez Parente, Fabio Maksymczuk, Flávio Ricco, José Armando Vanucci, Leão Lobo, Neuber Fischer, Nilson Xavier and Paulo Gustavo.

==== 2018 ====
Category	Nominees	Winner
Best Production	Onde Nascem os Fortes (TV Globo)	Onde Nascem os Fortes (TV Globo)
Best Production	Assédio (Globoplay)	Onde Nascem os Fortes (TV Globo)
Best Production	O Negócio (HBO Latin America)	Onde Nascem os Fortes (TV Globo)
Best Production	O Tempo Não Para (TV Globo)	Onde Nascem os Fortes (TV Globo)
Best Production	Sob Pressão (TV Globo)	Onde Nascem os Fortes (TV Globo)
Best TV Show	Amor & Sexo (TV Globo)	Amor & Sexo (TV Globo)
Best TV Show	Conversa com Bial (TV Globo)	Amor & Sexo (TV Globo)
Best TV Show	Drag Me As a Queen (E! Entertainment)	Amor & Sexo (TV Globo)
Best TV Show	Fábrica de Casamentos (SBT)	Amor & Sexo (TV Globo)
Best TV Show	Lady Night (Multishow)	Amor & Sexo (TV Globo)
Comedy	Marcelo Adnet for Parodies of the Presidential Candidates	Marcelo Adnet for Parodies of the Presidential Candidates
Comedy	Choque de Cultura (Omelete)	Marcelo Adnet for Parodies of the Presidential Candidates
Comedy	Fábio Porchat (Record)	Marcelo Adnet for Parodies of the Presidential Candidates
Comedy	Tá no Ar: A TV na TV (TV Globo)	Marcelo Adnet for Parodies of the Presidential Candidates
Comedy	Tatá Werneck (Multishow)	Marcelo Adnet for Parodies of the Presidential Candidates
Sports	Fernanda Gentil (TV Globo)	Fernanda Gentil (TV Globo)
Sports	Luís Roberto (TV Globo)	Fernanda Gentil (TV Globo)
Sports	Mulheres na Copa (Fox Sports)	Fernanda Gentil (TV Globo)
Sports	Seleção SporTV during the 2018 FIFA World Cup with André Rizek and Marcelo Barreto (SporTV)	Fernanda Gentil (TV Globo)
Sports	Sportscenter with Paulo Soares and Antero Greco (ESPN)	Fernanda Gentil (TV Globo)
Best Director	Amora Mautner for Assédio (Globoplay)	Amora Mautner for Assédio (Globoplay)
Best Director	Jayme Monjardim for Tempo de Amar (TV Globo)	Amora Mautner for Assédio (Globoplay)
Best Director	José Eduardo Belmonte for Carcereiros (Globoplay)	Amora Mautner for Assédio (Globoplay)
Best Director	José Luiz Villamarim for Onde Nascem os Fortes (TV Globo)	Amora Mautner for Assédio (Globoplay)
Best Director	José Padilha for O Mecanismo (Netflix)	Amora Mautner for Assédio (Globoplay)
Best Actress	Marjorie Estiano for Sob Pressão (TV Globo)	Marjorie Estiano for Sob Pressão (TV Globo)
Best Actress	Adriana Esteves for Assédio (Globoplay)	Marjorie Estiano for Sob Pressão (TV Globo)
Best Actress	Alice Wegmann for Onde Nascem os Fortes (TV Globo)	Marjorie Estiano for Sob Pressão (TV Globo)
Best Actress	Letícia Colin for Segundo Sol (TV Globo)	Marjorie Estiano for Sob Pressão (TV Globo)
Best Actress	Patrícia Pillar for Onde Nascem os Fortes (TV Globo)	Marjorie Estiano for Sob Pressão (TV Globo)
Best Actor	Fabio Assunção for Onde Nascem os Fortes (TV Globo)	Fabio Assunção for Onde Nascem os Fortes (TV Globo)
Best Actor	Antônio Calloni for Assédio (Globoplay)	Fabio Assunção for Onde Nascem os Fortes (TV Globo)
Best Actor	Edson Celulari for O Tempo Não Para (TV Globo)	Fabio Assunção for Onde Nascem os Fortes (TV Globo)
Best Actor	Jesuíta Barbosa for Onde Nascem os Fortes (TV Globo)	Fabio Assunção for Onde Nascem os Fortes (TV Globo)
Best Actor	Júlio Andrade for Sob Pressão and 1 Contra Todos (TV Globo/Fox Brasil)	Fabio Assunção for Onde Nascem os Fortes (TV Globo)

Voting: Cristina Padiglione, Edianez Parente, Fabio Maksymczuk, Flávio Ricco, Leão Lobo, Neuber Fischer, Nilson Xavier and Paulo Gustavo Pereira.

==== 2019 ====
Category	Nominees	Winner
Best Telenovela	Bom Sucesso (TV Globo)	Bom Sucesso (TV Globo)
Best Telenovela	Éramos Seis (TV Globo)	Bom Sucesso (TV Globo)
Best Telenovela	Espelho da Vida (TV Globo)	Bom Sucesso (TV Globo)
Best Telenovela	Órfãos da Terra (TV Globo)	Bom Sucesso (TV Globo)
Best Telenovela	Topíssima (Record)	Bom Sucesso (TV Globo)
Best Series	Segunda Chamada (TV Globo)	Segunda Chamada (TV Globo)
Best Series	A Divisão (Globoplay)	Segunda Chamada (TV Globo)
Best Series	Coisa Mais Linda (Netflix)	Segunda Chamada (TV Globo)
Best Series	Filhos da Pátria (TV Globo)	Segunda Chamada (TV Globo)
Best Series	Sob Pressão (TV Globo)	Segunda Chamada (TV Globo)
Best TV Show	Que História É Essa, Porchat? (TV Globo)	Que História É Essa, Porchat? (TV Globo)
Best TV Show	Cultura, o Musical (TV Cultura)	Que História É Essa, Porchat? (TV Globo)
Best TV Show	Pesadelo na Cozinha (Rede Bandeirantes)	Que História É Essa, Porchat? (TV Globo)
Best TV Show	Provocações (TV Cultura)	Que História É Essa, Porchat? (TV Globo)
Best TV Show	Zorra (TV Globo)	Que História É Essa, Porchat? (TV Globo)
Journalism	Roda Viva (TV Cultura)	Roda Viva (TV Cultura)
Journalism	Conexão Repórter (SBT)	Roda Viva (TV Cultura)
Journalism	Painel WW (William Waack on YouTube)	Roda Viva (TV Cultura)
Journalism	Profissão Repórter (TV Globo)	Roda Viva (TV Cultura)
Journalism	Segunda Chamada (My News Channel on YouTube)	Roda Viva (TV Cultura)
Best Director	Andrucha Waddington for Órfãos da Terra (TV Globo)	Andrucha Waddington for Órfãos da Terra (TV Globo)
Best Director	Carlos Araújo for Éramos Seis (TV Globo)	Andrucha Waddington for Órfãos da Terra (TV Globo)
Best Director	Joana Jabace for Segunda Chamada (TV Globo)	Andrucha Waddington for Órfãos da Terra (TV Globo)
Best Director	José Eduardo Belmonte for Carcereiros (Globoplay)	Andrucha Waddington for Órfãos da Terra (TV Globo)
Best Director	Vicente Amorim for A Divisão (Globoplay)	Andrucha Waddington for Órfãos da Terra (TV Globo)
Best Actor	Flávio Migliaccio for Órfãos da Terra (TV Globo)	Flávio Migliaccio for Órfãos da Terra (TV Globo)
Best Actor	Antônio Fagundes for Bom Sucesso (TV Globo)	Flávio Migliaccio for Órfãos da Terra (TV Globo)
Best Actor	Herson Capri for Órfãos da Terra (TV Globo)	Flávio Migliaccio for Órfãos da Terra (TV Globo)
Best Actor	Júlio Andrade for Sob Pressão (TV Globo)	Flávio Migliaccio for Órfãos da Terra (TV Globo)
Best Actor	Silvio Guidane for A Divisão (Globoplay)	Flávio Migliaccio for Órfãos da Terra (TV Globo)
Best Actress	Débora Bloch for Segunda Chamada (TV Globo)	Débora Bloch for Segunda Chamada (TV Globo)
Best Actress	Fabíula Nascimento for Sessão de Terapia (Globoplay)	Débora Bloch for Segunda Chamada (TV Globo)
Best Actress	Grazi Massafera for Bom Sucesso (TV Globo)	Débora Bloch for Segunda Chamada (TV Globo)
Best Actress	Maria Casadevall for Coisa Mais Linda (Globoplay)	Débora Bloch for Segunda Chamada (TV Globo)
Best Actress	Marjorie Estiano for Sob Pressão (TV Globo)	Débora Bloch for Segunda Chamada (TV Globo)

Voting: Cristina Padiglione, Edianez Parente, Fabio Maksymczuk, Flávio Ricco, Leão Lobo, Neuber Fischer, Nilson Xavier and Tony Goes.

=== 2020s ===
==== 2020 ====
Category	Nominees	Winner
Best Production	Bom Dia, Verônica (Netflix)	Bom Dia, Verônica (Netflix)
Best Production	Amor de Mãe (TV Globo)	Bom Dia, Verônica (Netflix)
Best Production	Desalma (Globoplay)	Bom Dia, Verônica (Netflix)
Best Production	Hebe: A Estrela do Brasil (Globoplay)	Bom Dia, Verônica (Netflix)
Best Production	Sob Pressão (TV Globo)	Bom Dia, Verônica (Netflix)
Comedy	Marcelo Adnet for Sinta-se em Casa (Globoplay)	Marcelo Adnet for Sinta-se em Casa (Globoplay)
Comedy	Diário de Um Confinado (Globoplay)	Marcelo Adnet for Sinta-se em Casa (Globoplay)
Comedy	CAT BBB with Rafael Portugal (TV Globo)	Marcelo Adnet for Sinta-se em Casa (Globoplay)
Comedy	Maria Bopp	Marcelo Adnet for Sinta-se em Casa (Globoplay)
Comedy	Paulo Vieira (TV Globo)	Marcelo Adnet for Sinta-se em Casa (Globoplay)
Best TV Show	Conversa com Bial (TV Globo)	Conversa com Bial (TV Globo)
Best TV Show	A Fazenda 12 (Record)	Conversa com Bial (TV Globo)
Best TV Show	Big Brother Brasil 20 (TV Globo)	Conversa com Bial (TV Globo)
Best TV Show	Combate ao Coronavírus (TV Globo)	Conversa com Bial (TV Globo)
Best TV Show	Guia Politicamente Incorreto - Season 2 (History Channel)	Conversa com Bial (TV Globo)
Highlight	CNN Brazil	CNN Brazil
Highlight	Márcio Gomes (TV Globo and CNN Brazil)	CNN Brazil
Highlight	Daniela Lima (CNN Brazil)	CNN Brazil
Highlight	Em nome de Deus (Globoplay)	CNN Brazil
Highlight	Falas Negras (TV Globo)	CNN Brazil
Best Actor	Eduardo Moscovis for Bom Dia, Verônica (Netflix)	Eduardo Moscovis for Bom Dia, Verônica (Netflix)
Best Actor	Antônio Grassi for Bom Dia, Verônica (Netflix)	Eduardo Moscovis for Bom Dia, Verônica (Netflix)
Best Actor	Chay Suede for Amor de Mãe (TV Globo)	Eduardo Moscovis for Bom Dia, Verônica (Netflix)
Best Actor	Júlio Andrade for Sob Pressão (TV Globo)	Eduardo Moscovis for Bom Dia, Verônica (Netflix)
Best Actor	Marcelo Melo Jr. for Arcanjo Renegado (Globoplay)	Eduardo Moscovis for Bom Dia, Verônica (Netflix)
Best Actress	Camila Morgado for Bom Dia, Verônica (Netflix)	Camila Morgado for Bom Dia, Verônica (Netflix) / Tatiana Tirburcio for Falas Negras (TV Globo)
Best Actress	Tatiana Tirburcio for Falas Negras (TV Globo)	Camila Morgado for Bom Dia, Verônica (Netflix) / Tatiana Tirburcio for Falas Negras (TV Globo)
Best Actress	Andréa Beltrão for Hebe: a Estrelha do Brasil (Globoplay)	Camila Morgado for Bom Dia, Verônica (Netflix) / Tatiana Tirburcio for Falas Negras (TV Globo)
Best Actress	Marjorie Estiano for Sob Pressão (TV Globo)	Camila Morgado for Bom Dia, Verônica (Netflix) / Tatiana Tirburcio for Falas Negras (TV Globo)
Best Actress	Regina Casé for Amor de Mãe (TV Globo)	Camila Morgado for Bom Dia, Verônica (Netflix) / Tatiana Tirburcio for Falas Negras (TV Globo)

Voting: Edianez Parente, Fabio Maksymczuk, Leão Lobo, Neuber Fischer, Paulo Gustavo Pereira and Tony Goes.

==== 2021 ====
Category	Nominees	Winner
Best Telenovela	Nos Tempos do Imperador (TV Globo)	Nos Tempos do Imperador (TV Globo)
Best Telenovela	Amor de Mãe (TV Globo)	Nos Tempos do Imperador (TV Globo)
Best Telenovela	Gênesis (Record)	Nos Tempos do Imperador (TV Globo)
Best Telenovela	Um Lugar ao Sol (TV Globo)	Nos Tempos do Imperador (TV Globo)
Best Series	Passaporte para Liberdade (TV Globo)	Passaporte para Liberdade (TV Globo)
Best Series	Dom (Prime Video)	Passaporte para Liberdade (TV Globo)
Best Series	Manhãs de Setembro (Prime Video)	Passaporte para Liberdade (TV Globo)
Best Series	Os Ausentes (HBO Max)	Passaporte para Liberdade (TV Globo)
Best Series	Cidade Invisível (Netflix)	Passaporte para Liberdade (TV Globo)
Best Series	Sob Pressão (TV Globo)	Passaporte para Liberdade (TV Globo)
Best Series	Onde Está Meu Coração (Globoplay)	Passaporte para Liberdade (TV Globo)
Best Attraction/TV Show/Documentaries	Missão Cabul (Record)	Missão Cabul (Record)
Best Attraction/TV Show/Documentaries	O Caso Evandro (Globoplay)	Missão Cabul (Record)
Best Attraction/TV Show/Documentaries	Doutor Castor (Globoplay)	Missão Cabul (Record)
Best Attraction/TV Show/Documentaries	Ismael Vivo (TV Cultura)	Missão Cabul (Record)
Best Attraction/TV Show/Documentaries	Projeto Identidade (TV Globo)	Missão Cabul (Record)
Best Attraction/TV Show/Documentaries	João de Deus-Cura e Crime (Netfli)	Missão Cabul (Record)
Best Actor	Juan Paiva for Um Lugar ao Sol (TV Globo)	Juan Paiva for Um Lugar ao Sol (TV Globo)
Best Actor	Gabriel Leone for Dom (Prime Video)	Juan Paiva for Um Lugar ao Sol (TV Globo)
Best Actor	Alexandre Nero for Nos Tempos do Imperador (TV Globo)	Juan Paiva for Um Lugar ao Sol (TV Globo)
Best Actor	Cauã Reymond for Um Lugar ao Sol (TV Globo)	Juan Paiva for Um Lugar ao Sol (TV Globo)
Best Actor	Chay Suede for Amor de Mãe (TV Globo)	Juan Paiva for Um Lugar ao Sol (TV Globo)
Best Actor	Marco Pigossi for Cidade Invisível (Netflix)	Juan Paiva for Um Lugar ao Sol (TV Globo)
Best Actress	Letícia Colin for Onde Está Meu Coração (Globoplay)	Letícia Colin for Onde Está Meu Coração (Globoplay) / Paula Cohen for Nos Tempos do Imperador (TV Globo)
Best Actress	Paula Cohen for Nos Tempos do Imperador (TV Globo)	Letícia Colin for Onde Está Meu Coração (Globoplay) / Paula Cohen for Nos Tempos do Imperador (TV Globo)
Best Actress	Regina Casé for Amor de Mãe (TV Globo)	Letícia Colin for Onde Está Meu Coração (Globoplay) / Paula Cohen for Nos Tempos do Imperador (TV Globo)
Best Actress	Débora Bloch for Segunda Chamada (TV Globo)	Letícia Colin for Onde Está Meu Coração (Globoplay) / Paula Cohen for Nos Tempos do Imperador (TV Globo)
Best Actress	Letícia Sabatella for Nos Tempos do Imperador (TV Globo)	Letícia Colin for Onde Está Meu Coração (Globoplay) / Paula Cohen for Nos Tempos do Imperador (TV Globo)
Best Actress	Mariana Ximenes for Nos Tempos do Imperador (TV Globo)	Letícia Colin for Onde Está Meu Coração (Globoplay) / Paula Cohen for Nos Tempos do Imperador (TV Globo)

Voting: Edianez Parente, Fabio Maksymczuk, Leão Lobo, Neuber Fischer, Paulo Gustavo Pereira and Tony Goes.

==== 2022 ====
Category	Nominees	Winner
Best Telenovela	Pantanal (TV Globo)	Pantanal (TV Globo)
Best Telenovela	Além da Ilusão (TV Globo)	Pantanal (TV Globo)
Best Telenovela	Mar do Sertão (TV Globo)	Pantanal (TV Globo)
Best Telenovela	Todas as Flores (TV Globo)	Pantanal (TV Globo)
Best Telenovela	Um Lugar ao Sol (TV Globo)	Pantanal (TV Globo)
Best Drama Series	Manhãs de Setembro (Prime Video)	Manhãs de Setembro (Prime Video)
Best Drama Series	Bom Dia, Verônica (Netflix)	Manhãs de Setembro (Prime Video)
Best Drama Series	Rensga Hits (Globoplay)	Manhãs de Setembro (Prime Video)
Best Drama Series	Rota 66 - A Polícia que Mata (Globoplay)	Manhãs de Setembro (Prime Video)
Best Drama Series	Sob Pressão (Globoplay)	Manhãs de Setembro (Prime Video)
Best Comedy Series	Encantado's (Globoplay)	Encantado's (Globoplay)
Best Comedy Series	Cine Holliúdy (TV Globo)	Encantado's (Globoplay)
Best Comedy Series	Eleita (Prime Video)	Encantado's (Globoplay)
Best Comedy Series	Tô de Graça (Multishow)	Encantado's (Globoplay)
Best Comedy Series	Vai que Cola (Multishow)	Encantado's (Globoplay)
Best Variety Show	Altas Horas (TV Globo)	Altas Horas (TV Globo)
Best Variety Show	1001 Perguntas (Rede Bandeirantes)	Altas Horas (TV Globo)
Best Variety Show	Caldeirão com Mion (TV Globo)	Altas Horas (TV Globo)
Best Variety Show	Domingão com Huck (TV Globo)	Altas Horas (TV Globo)
Best Variety Show	Lady Night (Multishow)	Altas Horas (TV Globo)
Best Documentary Series	Escola Base - Um Repórter Enfrenta o Passado (Globoplay)	Escola Base - Um Repórter Enfrenta o Passado (Globoplay)
Best Documentary Series	Brasil em Constituição (TV Globo)	Escola Base - Um Repórter Enfrenta o Passado (Globoplay)
Best Documentary Series	Missão Ucrânia (Record)	Escola Base - Um Repórter Enfrenta o Passado (Globoplay)
Best Documentary Series	O Canto Livre de Nara Leão (Globoplay)	Escola Base - Um Repórter Enfrenta o Passado (Globoplay)
Best Documentary Series	Pacto Brutal - O Assassinato de Daniela Perez (Globoplay)	Escola Base - Um Repórter Enfrenta o Passado (Globoplay)
Best Actor	Osmar Prado for Pantanal (TV Globo)	Osmar Prado for Pantanal (TV Globo)
Best Actor	Antonio Calloni for Além da Ilusão (TV Globo)	Osmar Prado for Pantanal (TV Globo)
Best Actor	Daniel de Oliveira for Independências (TV Cultura)	Osmar Prado for Pantanal (TV Globo)
Best Actor	Marcos Palmeira for Pantanal (TV Globo)	Osmar Prado for Pantanal (TV Globo)
Best Actor	Murilo Benício for Pantanal (TV Globo)	Osmar Prado for Pantanal (TV Globo)
Best Actress	Isabel Teixeira for Pantanal (TV Globo)	Isabel Teixeira for Pantanal (TV Globo)
Best Actress	Dira Paes for Pantanal (TV Globo)	Isabel Teixeira for Pantanal (TV Globo)
Best Actress	Letícia Colin for Todas as Flores (Globoplay)	Isabel Teixeira for Pantanal (TV Globo)
Best Actress	Paloma Duarte for Além da Ilusão (TV Globo)	Isabel Teixeira for Pantanal (TV Globo)
Best Actress	Sophie Charlotte for Todas as Flores (Globoplay)	Isabel Teixeira for Pantanal (TV Globo)

Voting: Cristina Padiglione, Edianez Parente (except for the Best Documentary Series category), Fabio Maksymczuk, Leão Lobo and Tony Goes.

==== 2023 ====
Category	Nominees	Winner
Best Telenovela	Vai na Fé (TV Globo)	Vai na Fé (TV Globo)
Best Telenovela	Amor Perfeito (TV Globo)	Vai na Fé (TV Globo)
Best Telenovela	Elas por Elas (TV Globo)	Vai na Fé (TV Globo)
Best Telenovela	Terra e Paixão (TV Globo)	Vai na Fé (TV Globo)
Best Telenovela	Todas as Flores (TV Globo)	Vai na Fé (TV Globo)
Best Fiction Series	Os Outros (Globoplay)	Os Outros (Globoplay)
Best Fiction Series	Cangaço Novo (Prime Video)	Os Outros (Globoplay)
Best Fiction Series	DNA do Crime (Netflix)	Os Outros (Globoplay)
Best Fiction Series	Dom (Prime Video)	Os Outros (Globoplay)
Best Fiction Series	Fim (Globoplay)	Os Outros (Globoplay)
Best Variety Show	Avisa Lá Que Eu Vou (GNT)	Avisa Lá Que Eu Vou (GNT)
Best Variety Show	Altas Horas (TV Globo)	Avisa Lá Que Eu Vou (GNT)
Best Variety Show	Domingão com Huck (TV Globo)	Avisa Lá Que Eu Vou (GNT)
Best Variety Show	Programa Sílvio Santos (SBT)	Avisa Lá Que Eu Vou (GNT)
Best Variety Show	Manhã do Ronnie (RedeTV)	Avisa Lá Que Eu Vou (GNT)
Best Documentary Series	Vale o Escrito - A Guerra do Jogo do Bicho (Globoplay)	Vale o Escrito - A Guerra do Jogo do Bicho (Globoplay)
Best Documentary Series	A Superfantástica História do Balão (Star+)	Vale o Escrito - A Guerra do Jogo do Bicho (Globoplay)
Best Documentary Series	Isabella: O Caso Nardoni (Netflix)	Vale o Escrito - A Guerra do Jogo do Bicho (Globoplay)
Best Documentary Series	JK: Reinventor do Brasil (TV Cultura)	Vale o Escrito - A Guerra do Jogo do Bicho (Globoplay)
Best Documentary Series	Línguas da Nossa Língua (Max)	Vale o Escrito - A Guerra do Jogo do Bicho (Globoplay)
Best Actor	Milhem Cortaz for Os Outros (Globoplay)	Milhem Cortaz for Os Outros (Globoplay)
Best Actor	Bruno Mazzeo for Fim (Globoplay)	Milhem Cortaz for Os Outros (Globoplay)
Best Actor	Eduardo Sterbllitch for Os Outros (Globoplay)	Milhem Cortaz for Os Outros (Globoplay)
Best Actor	Emílio Dantas for Vai na Fé (TV Globo)	Milhem Cortaz for Os Outros (Globoplay)
Best Actor	Thomás Aquino for DNA do Crime and Os Outros	Milhem Cortaz for Os Outros (Globoplay)
Best Actress	Sophie Charlotte for Todas as Flores (TV Globo)	Sophie Charlotte for Todas as Flores (TV Globo)
Best Actress	Adriana Esteves for Os Outros (Globoplay)	Sophie Charlotte for Todas as Flores (TV Globo)
Best Actress	Letícia Colin for Todas as Flores (TV Globo)	Sophie Charlotte for Todas as Flores (TV Globo)
Best Actress	Maeve Jinkings for DNA do Crime and Os Outros	Sophie Charlotte for Todas as Flores (TV Globo)
Best Actress	Marjorie Estiano for FIm (Globoplay)	Sophie Charlotte for Todas as Flores (TV Globo)
Breakthrough	Alice Carvalho for Cangaço Novo (Prime Video)	Alice Carvalho for Cangaço Novo (Prime Video)
Breakthrough	Amaury Lorenzo for Terra e Paixão (TV Globo)	Alice Carvalho for Cangaço Novo (Prime Video)
Breakthrough	Clara Moneke for Vai na Fé (TV Globo)	Alice Carvalho for Cangaço Novo (Prime Video)
Breakthrough	Diego Martins for Terra e Paixão (TV Globo)	Alice Carvalho for Cangaço Novo (Prime Video)
Breakthrough	Levi Asaf for Amor Perfeito (TV Globo)	Alice Carvalho for Cangaço Novo (Prime Video)

Voting: Cristina Padiglione, Edianez Parente, Fabio Maksymczuk, José Armando Vannucci, Leão Lobo, Neuber Fischer, Paulo Gustavo Pereira and Tony Goes.

== See also ==
- Melhores do Ano Troféu Domingão
- Meus Prêmios Nick
- Troféu Imprensa
