= Bruno Mazzeo =

Brazilian comedian and screenwriter

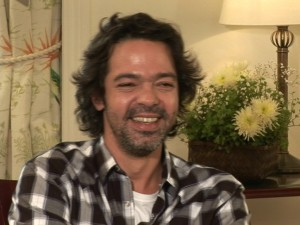
- Mazzeo in an interview with ‘’Conexão Roberto D'Avila‘’ in 2011
- Born: Bruno Mazzeo de Oliveira Paula; 3 May 1977 (age 49); Rio de Janeiro, Rio de Janeiro, Brazil
- Citizenship: Brazilian
- Occupations: writer; actor; comedian
- Years active: 1988–present
- Height: 1.83 m (6 ft 0 in)
- Spouse(s): Renata Castro Barbosa (m. 2004; div. 2008) Joana Jabace (m. 2016)
- Parents: Chico Anysio (father); Alcione Mazzeo (mother)
- Relatives: Nizo Neto, Lug de Paula (brothers); Cininha de Paula, Marcos Palmeira, Maria Maya (cousins)

Bruno Mazzeo de Oliveira Paula (May 3, 1977) is a Brazilian screenwriter, actor, television producer, and comedian. Bruno was part of the writing teams for successful comedy shows on Brazilian TV, such as Sai de Baixo, A Diarista, and Escolinha do Professor Raimundo.

== Biography ==
Bruno Mazzeo, the son of comedian Chico Anysio and actress Alcione Mazzeo, was born in Rio de Janeiro in 1977. In 2005, he wrote and starred in the series Cilada, which aired on Multishow; it was the first comedy show produced by a Brazilian cable television network, and it is now in its sixth season. In April 2009, the program became a segment of the Sunday show Fantástico.

In 2006, he played Rick Lacerda, the boss of Heloísa Perissé’s character in the comedy series Sob Nova Direção from TV Globo. In 2008, he played the scheming lawyer José Henrique in the soap opera Beleza Pura. In 2010, he appeared in the film Muita Calma Nessa Hora, for which he was one of the screenwriters and an associate producer. In 2012, he appeared in the soap opera Cheias de Charme, playing the role of music executive Tom Bastos.

In 2015, he played Teacher Raimundo Donato in the revival of the series Escolinha do Professor Raimundo. The role was played by his father, Chico Anysio, for over four decades. The series ran for six seasons.

In 2020, during the COVID-19 pandemic, he created and starred in two seasons of the series Diário de Um Confinado on the streaming service Globoplay. The series was nominated for a 2021 International Emmy Award. In 2022, he appeared in the second season of the series Arcanjo Renegado. Also on Globoplay, he was part of the cast of the series The End, from 2023. In 2023, after 38 years with the network, he announced his departure from TV Globo.

In 2024, he starred in the play Gostava Mais dos Pais alongside Lúcio Mauro Filho, the son of actor Lúcio Mauro. The play is a comedy about being the children of famous actors and the prospects of pursuing a career in the arts. In the miniseries O Século do Globo, from 2025 produced to celebrate the 100th anniversary of the newspaper O Globo, he played the playwright Nelson Rodrigues.

After an 11-year hiatus from soap operas, in 2026, he appeared in a few episodes of the soap opera Coração Acelerado, where he reprised his role as Tom Bastos. That same year, he was cast to play Mário Zagallo in the Netflix series Brasil 70: A Saga do Tri.

== Filmography ==
=== Cinema ===
Year	Title	Character	Note(s)	Ref.
2010	Muita Calma Nessa Hora	Renan		
2011	Cilada.com	Bruno		
2012	E Aí... Comeu?	Fernando		
2013	Vai que Dá Certo	Paulo		
2014	Muita Calma Nessa Hora 2	Renan		
2017	Chocante	Téo		
2024	Voltando a ler Graúna	Himself	Documentary	

=== Television ===
Year	Title	Character	Note(s)	Ref.
1988	Caso Especial	Kiko's friend	Episode "O Dia Mais Quente do Ano"	
1992	Escolinha do Professor Raimundo	Mazaritinho	Children's Day Special	
2004	Sítio do Picapau Amarelo	Aladdin	Episodes: "2 de agosto–8 de novembro"	
2005–2009	Cilada	Bruno		
2006	Sob Nova Direção	Rick Lacerda		
2007	Pé na Jaca	Merlim (young)	Episode "17 de maio"	
2008	Casos e Acasos	Jonas		
2008	Casos e Acasos	Zé	Episode "O Presépio"	
2008	Beleza Pura	José Henrique Pinto		
2009	Malhação	Marciano		
2009	Chico e Amigos	Paulo Pindorama	Year-End Special	
2010	Junto & Misturado	Bruno		
2011	É Pai, É Pedra	Eduardo	Fantástico Segment	
2012	Cheias de Charme	Antônio Bastos (Tom Bastos)		
2013	Junto & Misturado	Bruno		
2013	A Grande Família	Director	Episode "Como Não Ser Solteiro no Rio de Janeiro"	
2014	A Grande Família	Silveira	Episode "Multar ou Correr"	
2015	A Regra do Jogo	Rui Villar		
2015–2021	Escolinha do Professor Raimundo	Professor Raimundo Nonato		
2017	Tá no Ar	Bruno Mazzeo	Episode "6 de março"	
2018	Tá no Ar	Bruno Mazzeo	Episode "30 de janeiro"	
2017–2019	Filhos da Pátria	Narrator		
2020	Diário de Um Confinado	Murilo Barros		
2022	Arcanjo Renegado	Joel Fontoura	Season 2	
2023	The End	Sílvio Batista		
2024–2025	Cilada	Bruno		
2025	O Século do Globo	Nelson Rodrigues	Episode "1"	
2025	Os Donos do Jogo	Renzo		
2026	Coração Acelerado	Antônio Bastos (Tom Bastos)	Episodes: "28 de fevereiro–3 de março"	
2026	Juntas e Separadas	Márvio Gonçalves		
2026	Brazil 70: The Third Star	Mário Zagallo		

=== Theater ===
Year	Title	Note(s)	Ref.
1996	O Piauí É Aqui - Ou Não	Co-author	
2002	Meninas de Rua		
2002–2007	Os Segredos do Pênis - Os Segredos Que Só os Homens Têm	Author	
2003	Balada	Actor	
2003	Nós Dois e Grande Elenco		
2003–2004	Os Famosos Quem?	Actor, co-author e producer	
2006–2009	Enfim, Nós	Actor, co-author e co-producer	
2007	A Volta das que Não Foram	Co-author	
2010	Alucinadas	Co-author	
2013	Sexo, Drogas e Rock’n'Roll	Actor	
2024–2025	Gostava Mais dos Pais	Actor	

=== As a screenwriter ===
==== Cinema ====
Year	Title	Ref.
2010	Muita Calma Nessa Hora	
2011	Cilada.com	

==== Television ====
Year	Title	Ref.
1985–1990	Chico Anysio Show	
1991–1994	Escolinha do Professor Raimundo	
1996	Chico Total	
1997–2000	Sai de Baixo	
1998–1999	Vida ao Vivo Show	
2003	Carol & Bernardo	
2004–2007	A Diarista	
2005–2009	Cilada	
2017	Filhos da Pátria	
2020	Diário de Um Confinado	

== Personal life ==
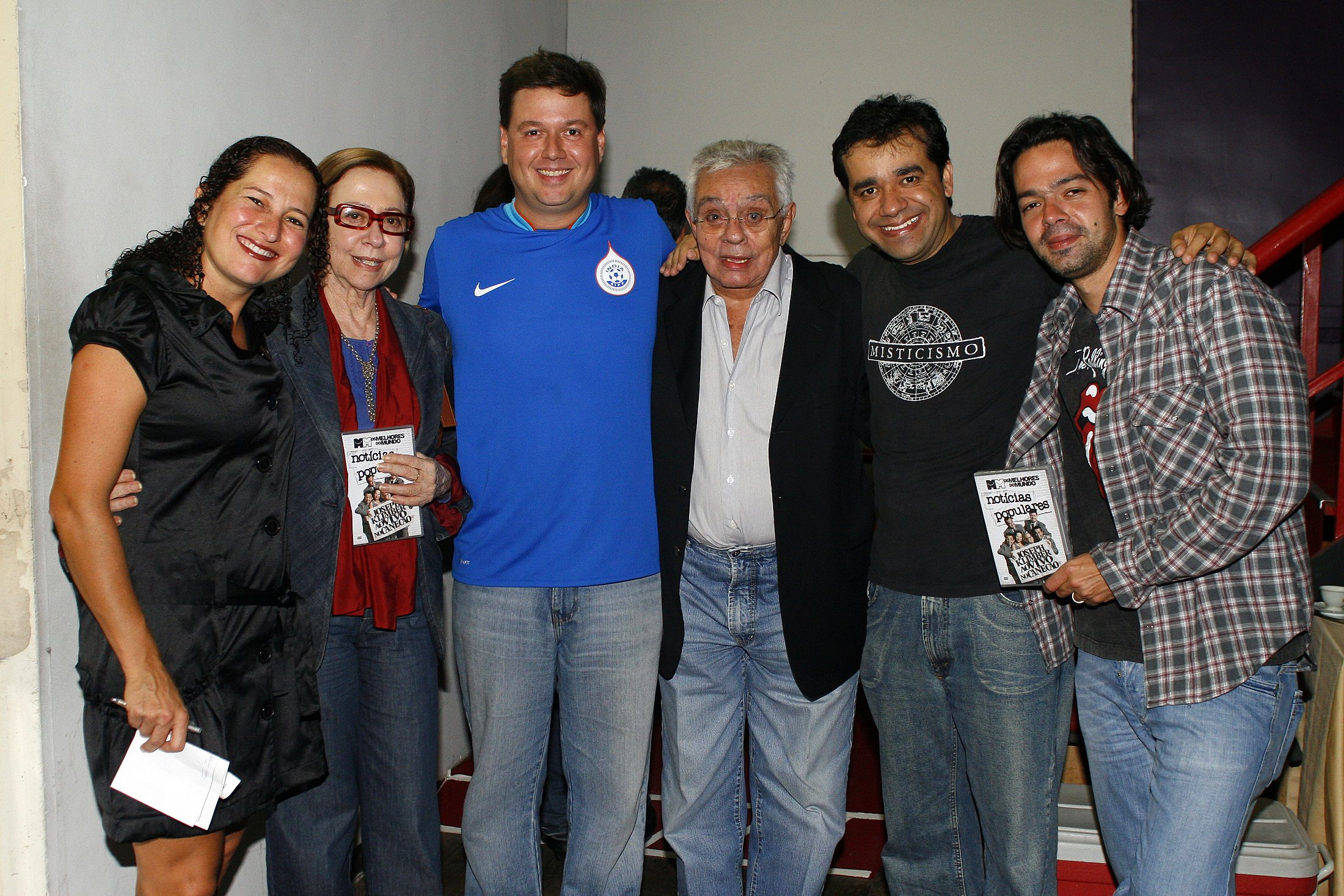
Bruno on the right, with his father, Chico Anysio, in the center, and actress Fernanda Montenegro on the left.

He is the brother of comedians Nizo Neto and Lug de Paula, the cousin of actress Cininha de Paula and actor Marcos Palmeira, and the second cousin of actress Maria Maya.

He was married to actress Renata Castro Barbosa from 2004 to 2008, with whom he has a son named João. He is currently married to director Joana Jabace, with whom he has twins named José and Francisco.

He is a CR Vasco da Gama fan. In an interview with the journalist Elena Côrrea from Quem Acontece magazine, he said he had smoked marijuana as a teenager, but that after that he stuck to beer. He used to smoke cigarettes. The actor lives in the South Zone from Rio de Janeiro.

== Prizes ==
Year	Awards Ceremony	Category	Work	Result	Ref.
2008	Prêmio Arte Qualidade Brasil	Best Supporting Actor in a Television Drama	Beleza Pura	Nominated	
2008	Prêmio Arte Qualidade Brasil	Best Pay-TV Program	Cilada	Won	
2010	Prêmio Arte Qualidade Brasil	Best Actor in a Comedy Series	Junto & Misturado	Won	
2010	Prêmio Arte Qualidade Brasil	Best Comedy Show	Junto & Misturado	Nominated	
2011	Grande Prêmio do Cinema Brasileiro	Best Original Screenplay	Muita Calma Nessa Hora	Nominated	
2012	Meus Prêmios Nick	Favorite Comedian	Cilada.com	Nominated	
2012	Grande Prêmio do Cinema Brasileiro	Best Original Screenplay	Cilada.com	Nominated	
2017	Prêmio APCA de Televisão	Best Series/Miniseries	Filhos da Pátria	Nominated	
2019	Prêmio APCA de Televisão	Best Series/Miniseries	Filhos da Pátria	Nominated	
2020	Prêmio APCA de Televisão	Humor	Diário de Um Confinado	Nominated	
2021	International Emmy Awards	Best Short-Form Series	Diário de Um Confinado	Nominated	
2023	Prêmio APCA de Televisão	Best Actor	The End	Nominated	
2024	Grande Prêmio do Cinema Brasileiro	Best Actor in a Drama Series on Broadcast TV, Pay TV, or Streaming	The End	Nominated	

== Books ==
- Brasil 2020 - Socorro!!! O Futuro Chegou. Rio de janeiro: Frente Editora, 1996. (with a foreword by Luis Fernando Verissimo)
