= Nizo Neto =

Brazilian actor (born 1964)

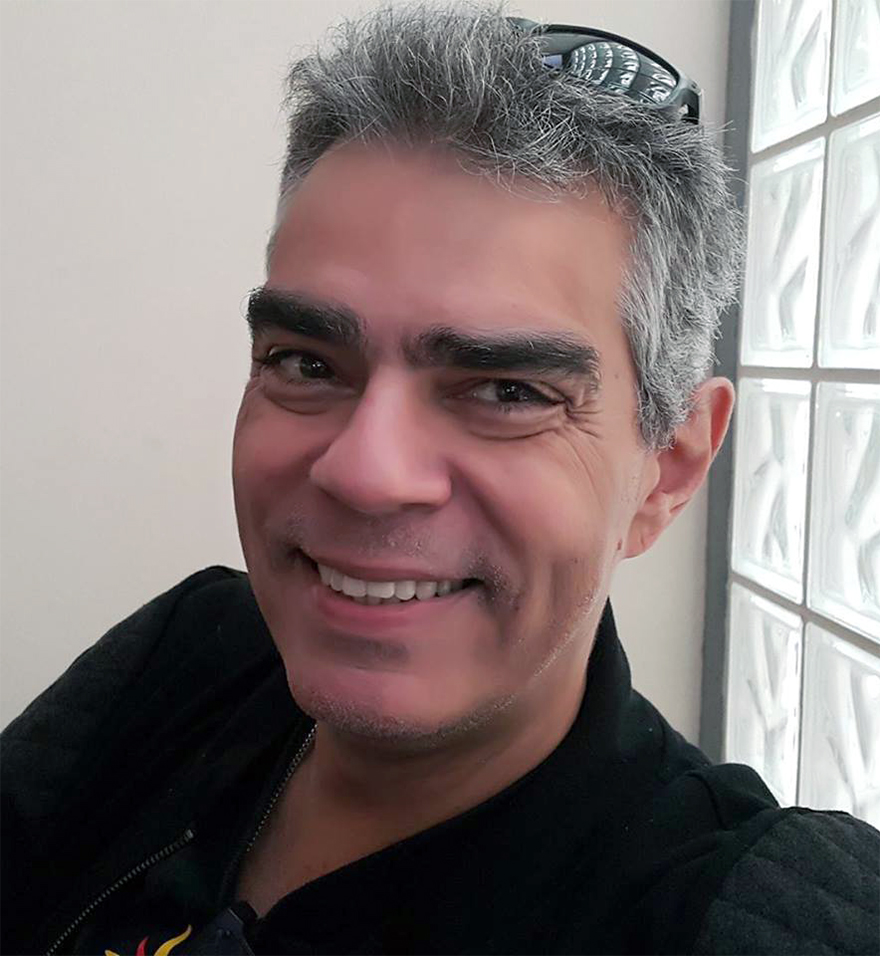
- Nizo in 2015
- Born: Francisco Anízio de Oliveira Paula Neto; 27 April 1964 (age 61); Rio de Janeiro, Brazil
- Occupations: Actor, voice-over specialist
- Spouse(s): Nádia Carvalho (m. 1984–1989) Tatiana Presser (m. 2002)
- Children: Rian (deceased), Isabela, Sofia

Nizo Neto (born 27 April 1964 in Rio de Janeiro) is a Brazilian stage, television and film actor best known as Mr. Ptolomeu in the series Escolinha do Professor Raimundo. He is the son of actor and humorist Chico Anysio and actress Rose Rondelli. He's also a respected voice actor and radio personality.

== Personal life ==
Born in Rio de Janeiro in 1964, Neto studied theater at the Teatro O Tablado and started acting in 1971.

Neto is working with the comedy magazine like MAD and O Mágico (The Magician) for magicians, while also appearing as an actor on Zorra on number one Brazilian TV network Rede Globo. Aside from his acting career, he has also been lending his voice to several Portuguese speaking movies, series and cartoons broadcast in Brazil. His dubbing work includes, among others, voice acting for Michael J. Fox, Seann William Scott, Matthew Broderick and Patrick Dempsey as like as several cartoons including Dungeons & Dragons (Presto), Thundercats (Willycat), Ben 10 (Heatblast), Muppet Babies (Fozzie), Up (Dug) and many others. He also directed the Circulo Brasileiro de Ilusionismo (Brazilian Illusionists Circle).

He is married to psychologist/sex coach Tatiana Presser, with whom he has two children: Isabela and Sofia. Together they work in the lecture/comedy theater show Vem Transar Com a Gente.

At March 3, 2016, Neto experienced the tragic early death of his 25 years old son Rian Brito, found on a beach in the city of Quissamã, in the state of Rio de Janeiro. According to the local police, the cause of death was drowning.

== Career ==
=== Television ===
Year	Title	Role	Notes
1971	Chico em Quadrinhos		
1972	Linguinha	Carêta	
1973/80	Chico City	Negritim, Carêta and Sérvio Tulio	
1974	Azambuja & Cia	Himself	
1982	Chico Anysio Show	Ptolomeu, Gato	
1982	Chico Total	Various characters	
1985	Sítio do Picapau Amarelo	Raulzinho	
1986	Sinhá Moça	Nino	
1990 - 1996	Escolinha do Professor Raimundo	Ptolomeu	
1991	Estados Anysios de Chico City	Mail man Japeri	
1995	A Próxima Vítima	Marco	
1996	A Vida Como Ela É	Friend 2	
1999	Malhação	Detective Penalva	Season 6
2000	O Cravo e a Rosa	François	
2001	Estrela-Guia	Elesbão	
2002	Brava Gente	Captain Mário	
2002/05	Sítio do Picapau Amarelo	Nestor / Frankeinstein	
2004	A Diarista	Pedro Paulo / Magician	
2004	Sob Nova Direção		
2004	Cabocla	Irineu	
2004	Um Só Coração	Camilo	
2005	Malhação	Vicente Bruno	Season 12
2006	Carga Pesada	Antenor	
2007	Eterna Magia	Brasil	
2008	Faça Sua História	Gadelha	Episode: "Bandeira 5"
2008	Guerra & Paz	Valtinho	
2008	Dicas de um Sedutor	Carlos	
2008 - 2014	Zorra Total	Various	
2009	Chico e Amigos	Cadelo	
2012	Dercy de Verdade	Chico Anysio	
2013	Gentalha	White Hair Columnist	
2015/17	Zorra	Various characters	
2018/19	Impuros	Anselmo	
2018	Power Couple Brasil	Himself	Season 3
2018	Dancing Brasil	Himself	Season 4
2019	Multitom	Congressman Chico	

=== Film ===
Year	Title	Role	Notes
1980	Insomnia		
1984	Johnny Love	Serginho	
2006	Beaultiful Night To Fly	Lieutenant Estopim	
2009	Up	Dug	Brazilian voice
2013	Vendo ou Alugo	Lieutenant Gomide	
2014	Muita Calma Nessa Hora 2	Otávio Pederneiras	
2015	The Mayor	Mayor	
2015	My Hindu Friend	Norman	
2017	The Indigo Girl	Psiquiatrist	
2017	Duas de Mim	Zé	
2017	Nobody Gets In, Nobody Gets Out	Joel	
2019	Haunted Love	Buttler	
2019	Couch	Mayor	
2020	My Last Wish	Judge	

=== Theater ===
Year	Title	Role	Notes
1980	O Diamante do Grão-Mogol	Badé Relâmpago	
1980/84	Grupo Civelu Espetáculos Infantis	Various characters	
1984	A Tocha na América	Various characters	
1985	Um Toque de Hitchcock	Various characters	
1985	Como a Lua	Payá	
1985	Encouraçado Botequim	Various characters	
1985	Rocky Stallone	Various characters	
1989	Plumas & Paletós	Various characters	
1991	Oh, Que Gracinha de Escola	Ptolomeu	
1992	Os Saltimbancos	The Donkey	
1993	Ed Mort – Um Detetive Brasileiro	Ed	
1993	Teatro de Terror	Various characters	
1994	Dom Quixote & Sancho Pança	Dom Quixote	
1995	Band-Age	Diniz	
1995	A Menina e o Vento	Comissário Plácido	
2000	Rio’s Cabaret Musical	Himself (magic)	
2000/01	Tudo de Bom!	Ricardo	
2002	Descontrole Remoto	Various characters	
2003	Os Famosos Quem?	Various characters	
2003	Tem Um Psicanalista na Nossa Cama	Dr. Felipe	
2003	Segredos do Pênis		
2006	Memórias Póstumas de Brás Cubas	Brás Cubas	
2008	Natal na Praça (Globo's Live Christmas Show)	Melchior	
2012/14	Vem Transar Com a Gente	Himself	

=== Radio ===
Title	Notes
I Always Wanted To Do Radio	Rádio Globo
Globo's Mornings (Debates Populares)	Rádio Globo, with Roberto Canázio
The Life of Christ - Life of Christ	EMI-Odeon
Stories of Life	Rádio Globo RJ
The Maré Mansa Gang	Rádio Globo / Tupi
Humor para Valer	São Paulo
