= Paulo Silvino =

Brazilian comedian, composer, and actor

- Born: Paulo Ricardo Campos Silvino; 27 July 1939; Rio de Janeiro, Brazil
- Died: August 17, 2017 (aged 78); Rio de Janeiro, Brazil
- Occupation(s): Composer, comedian, actor
- Years active: 1957 - 2017
- Spouse: Diva Plácido (1967-1983; divorced)

Paulo Ricardo Campos Silvino (27 July 1939 – 17 August 2017) was a Brazilian comedian, composer and actor.

== Biography ==
Silvino worked for 52 years on television Rede Globo and Sistema Brasileiro de Televisão (SBT).

He also worked in soap operas and in the cinema, in the film Muita Calma Nessa Hora 2. In 1988, he presented the TV program "Cassino do Chacrinha" until the death of the presenter, Chacrinha.

Silvino died of stomach cancer in Rio de Janeiro on August 17, 2017, aged 78.

== Filmography ==
=== Film ===
- Sherlock de Araque (1957)
- Minha Sogra É da Polícia (1958)
- O Rei da Pilantragem (1968)
- Com a Cama na Cabeça (1972)
- Um Edifício Chamado 200 (1973)
- Muita Calma Nessa Hora 2 (2014)
- Até que a Sorte nos Separe 3: A Falência Final (2015) - Padre Elias
- Gostosas, Lindas e Sexies (2017) - Gilson (final film role)

=== TV shows ===
==== At Globo TV ====
- Balança Mas Não Cai (pt) (1968)
- Faça Humor, Não Faça Guerra (pt) (1970)
- Planeta dos Homens (pt) (1976)
- Viva o Gordo (pt) (1981)
- Zorra Total (2006-2016) - Severino

==== At SBT TV ====
- A Praça É Nossa (1987) - Homem do Açucareiro (1989-1992)
