= Brazil 70: The Third Star =

Brazilian miniseries

- Also known as: Brasil 70: A Saga do Tri
- Genre: Historical drama Sports; Historical fiction
- Created by: Naná Xavier; Rafael Dornellas
- Written by: Felipe Sant’Angelo; Maíra Oliveira; Naná Xavier; Rafael Dornellas; Álvaro Mamute; Leonardo Ortiz
- Directed by: Paulo Morelli; Pedro Morelli; Quico Meirelles
- Starring: Rodrigo Santoro; Bruno Mazzeo; Lucas Agrícola; Marcelo Adnet; Bruna Mascarenhas; Gui Ferraz; Ravel Andrade; Maicon Rodrigues; Caio Cabral; Daniel Blanco; Val Perré; Lara Tremouroux; Felipe Frazão; Fillipe Soutto; José Beltrão
- Country of origin: Brazil
- Original language: Portuguese
- No. of seasons: 1
- No. of episodes: 5

Production
- Producer: O2 Filmes
- Production locations: Brazil; Mexico
- Camera setup: Cinematographic
- Running time: 45 minutes
- Production companies: Netflix; O2 Filmes

Original release
- Network: Netflix
- Release: May 29, 2026

Brazil '70: The Third Star (Portuguese: Brasil 70: A Saga do Tri) is a Brazilian Netflix miniseries, produced in partnership with O2 Filmes. Directed by Paulo Morelli, Pedro Morelli, and Quico Meirelles, this series created by Naná Xavier and Rafael Dornellas explores the behind-the-scenes story and most iconic moments of the Brazilian national team’s victorious campaign to win its third FIFA World Cup title in 1970 in Mexico, set against the political backdrop of Brazil’s military dictatorship.

The series was written by Felipe Sant’Angelo, Maíra Oliveira, Naná Xavier, and Rafael Dornellas, with assistance from Leonardo Ortiz and consulting by Álvaro Mamute.

The cast includes Rodrigo Santoro, Bruno Mazzeo, and Lucas Agrícola in the lead roles, and Marcelo Adnet, Ravel Andrade, Val Perré, Lara Tremouroux, and José Beltrão in supporting roles.

== Plot ==
In the midst of the military dictatorship, while the country was living under censorship, repression, and political tension, a group of football players set off for Mexico with the weight of a nation on their shoulders and a mission to prove that football could still be a source of pride and unity for the Brazilian people.

The series follows the internal conflicts, the changes in leadership, the controversial departure of João Saldanha, linked to the Brazilian Communist Party (PCB), the arrival of Mário Zagallo as coach just a few months before the 1970 FIFA World Cup, and the personal and political dilemmas that marked the path to glory. Pelé, Jairzinho, Tostão, Rivellino, Carlos Alberto Torres, and other stars come to life not only as sports idols but as men living through one of the most complex periods in Brazilian history.

== Cast ==
- Rodrigo Santoro as João Saldanha
- Bruno Mazzeo as Zagallo
- Lucas Agrícola as Pelé
- Gui Ferraz as Jairzinho
- Ravel Andrade as Tostão
- Maicon Rodrigues as Paulo Cézar Caju
- Caio Cabral as Carlos Alberto Torres
- Daniel Blanco as Rivellino
- Fillipe Soutto as Gérson
- Hugo Haddad as Félix
- José Beltrão as Carlos Alberto Parreira
- Victor Salomão as Dadá Maravilha
- Val Perré as Mário Américo
- Marcelo Adnet as Eusébio Teixeira
- Lara Tremouroux as Rosa
- Julia Stockler as Thereza Bulhões
- Felipe Frazão as Leo
- Bruna Mascarenhas as Rosemeri
- Nelson Baskerville as João Havelange
- Vanderley Bernardino as Brigadeiro Braga
- Rogério Brito as Dondinho
- Fania Espinosa as Celeste Arantes
- Fabiano Heves as Enrico Albertosi.

== Production ==
On February 25, 2025, Netflix officially announced the development of a dramatized miniseries about the Brazilian national team’s campaign in the 1970 FIFA World Cup. The project was conceived and directed by Pedro Morelli and Paulo Morelli. The series aimed to reconstruct the behind-the-scenes story of the historic third World Cup victory in Mexico, blending the sporting, political, and social elements of the era, including the impact of the military dictatorship in Brazil.

Filming took place in the second half of 2025, with locations in Brazil and Mexico, the host country of the 1970 World Cup. Even in the early stages of pre-production, several names were considered for the cast. One of them was actor Marcelo Serrado, who was being considered to play coach Zagallo. However, negotiations did not progress, and the role was ultimately given to Bruno Mazzeo months later. This marked his second role in streaming productions following Os Donos do Jogo after his departure from TV Globo.

On July 17, 2025, Netflix officially announced the series’ main cast, including lead actors Rodrigo Santoro as journalist and former coach João Saldanha, Bruno Mazzeo as Zagallo, and Lucas Agrícola as Pelé. Other cast members confirmed for supporting roles include Marcelo Adnet, Ravel Andrade, Val Perré, Lara Tremouroux, and José Beltrão. The working title of the production was revealed as “Brasil 70 – A Saga do Tri.”

== Episodes ==
Temporada 1 (2026)
N.º	T.	Title	Original display
1	1	"Pelé, jogai por nós"	May 29, 2026
After the traumatic 1966 FIFA World Cup in England, where Brazil was eliminated in the group stage, Pelé was hesitant to return to the national team. Coach João Saldanha’s revolutionary tactics convinced him to give playing for the national team one more chance.
2	2	"Os 11 de Zagallo"	May 29, 2026
Shortly before the tournament, coach João Saldanha was fired. Zagallo took over as the new coach, stepping into a volatile situation with the team as they headed to the heat of Mexico.
3	3	"Que rei sou eu?"	May 29, 2026
Brazilian players need to overcome internal political tensions to stay focused and take on a highly skilled opponent.
4	4	"O fantasma do Maracanazo"	May 29, 2026
As the final approaches, the team is overcome by fear and anxiety, haunted by Brazil’s defeat to Uruguay in the 1950 FIFA World Cup, a match that became known as the Maracanazo.
5	5	"Eu não morri"	May 29, 2026
With the final match against Italy approaching and enormous pressure to bring the trophy back to Brazil, the star player isn't in peak physical condition, but he's proving to be a decisive force.

== Release ==
The series premiered on Netflix on May 29, 2026.

== Critical reception ==
At least five columnists from the São Paulo newspaper Folha de S. Paulo wrote about the series, offering differing opinions. Writer Tati Bernardi praised the series, writing: “‘Brasil 70’ had me frantically rooting for historic plays, including shots I already knew wouldn’t go in. I’m sure there’s another Brazilian goal to come,” in addition to praising the direction by Paulo and Pedro Morelli and the “glorious” performances by Rodrigo Santoro and Bruno Mazzeo, as well as noting that Lucas Agrícola “did a great job.” Journalist Mauricio Stycer, on the other hand, offered a mixed review of the series, noting, “The miniseries is often sensationalist, ignores real facts, distorts situations, and portrays its protagonists in a caricatured manner.” Journalist Thiago Uberreich, author of five books on Brazil’s achievements, including one on the 1970 World Cup, saw “a Mexican soap opera” on screen. [...] “Brasil 70” gets it right in trying to appeal to young people and/or foreigners, but falls short for those who, like Eduardo Galeano, understand that “soccer is the only religion that has no atheists.” Luís Curro also noted, "The blend of imagination and truth pays off. It makes the five-episode series appealing to those who are familiar with the events and want to revisit them in an emotional and passionate way. And it’s inviting to those who know little or nothing about them, since it doesn’t simply involve soccer, but soccer’s relationship with the military dictatorship in the late 1960s and early 1970s. This backdrop is very much present.” Gustavo Alonso gave the series a positive review, noting, “Soccer isn't the opium of the people, and Netflix has just proven it,” and adding that the series “lends cinematic dignity to a legend that was already part of the national identity, transcending governments and ideologies. A must-watch that will move you and get you pumped up for the World Cup.” In his newspaper column, former soccer player Tostão, played by Ravel Andrade, praised the series: “The series is well-made, enjoyable to watch, and exciting; it features great actors and excellent recreations of key plays and goals, but there are many made-up and sensationalized scenes intended to dramatize a major sporting achievement.” and noted, “The pressure exerted by Pelé and other players on Zagallo to select me wasn’t explicit, as the series shows [...] If there was pressure, it was silent, through glances, between the lines, and in whispered conversations. Gerson, who played for Botafogo under Zagallo, talked a lot with the coach. I didn’t go to Zagallo to say that I had to be a starter, as the series shows. Contrary to what is shown, Pelé was a conscientious, balanced, good-humored, and very emotionally strong athlete.”

Alexandre Almeida, from the pop culture website Omelete, gave the series 5 out of 5 stars and wrote, "Brasil 70: A Saga do Tri is a pop culture masterpiece with a frenetic pace that strongly resembles Senna at times, but proves to be even more successful in achieving its goals. The series is moving not only because of Pelé and his teammates’ victory, but because it revives a feeling that was taken from us after the 7-1 loss to Germany and the political period that followed.” Alan Pinheiro, of the Correio newspaper, gave a positive review: “The miniseries, like Brazilian soccer, isn't perfect in every aspect, but it has enough sparkle, history, and heart to win over audiences and do justice to the jersey it wears.” Angelo Cordeiro of Rolling Stone magazine also wrote in a laudatory tone that “the result is a blockbuster that recreates the Mexico World Cup with cinematic energy, without letting the trophy's brilliance overshadow the conflicts and tensions of the era.” Eduardo Tironi, writing for the sports newspaper Lance!, gave the series a mixed review: "The series is far, very far, from being a masterpiece. Don’t expect a brilliantly crafted script, spectacular cinematography, or some new, untold story about what is considered the greatest team of all time. [...] That is the magic of “Brasil 70: a saga do Tri”: showing soccer as a form of entertainment capable of captivating even those who don’t like the game. If you watch the series with an open mind, you may well get drawn in and start looking at the upcoming World Cup in a whole new light."

Mattheus Goto, writing for Veja São Paulo magazine, gave the series 4 out of 5 stars and noted, “The series is technically and thematically rigorous, with excellence in cinematography and direction. It masterfully presents memorable moments from that year, including matches against countries such as Czechoslovakia, England, and Peru.” Luciano Buarque de Holanda, writing for the business newspaper Valor Econômico, gave it a rating of three out of five, noting that "it’s more compelling than most soccer movies [...] The on-field scenes are surprisingly well-filmed, with the help of drones and tracking shots, but above all, with choreography strictly based on plays from the 1970 World Cup. Not that everything is perfect: the use of slow motion is excessive and gets worse when the camera freezes on the actors’ astonished faces, tracking the ball’s path as if in an episode of ‘Captain Tsubasa'.’”
