= Dani Calabresa =

Brazilian comedian and actress

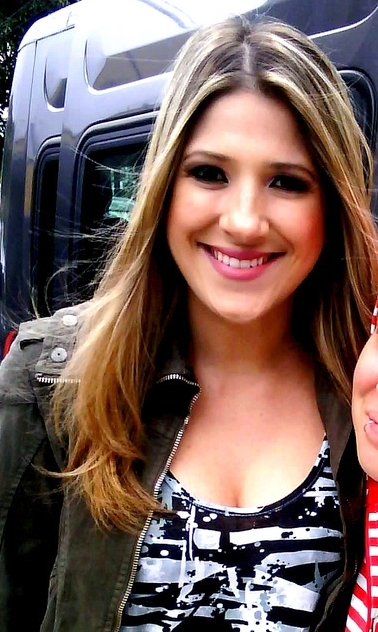
- Calabresa in 2010
- Born: Daniella Maria Giusti Barra; 12 November 1981 (age 44); São Bernardo do Campo, São Paulo, Brazil
- Occupations: Comedian; actress; screenwriter; television presenter
- Years active: 1990, 2005–present
- Spouse: Marcelo Adnet (m. 2010; div. 2017) Richard Neuman (m. 2022)

Daniella Maria Giusti Barra (born 12 November 1981), known professionally as Dani Calabresa, is a Brazilian comedian, actress, screenwriter, and television presenter. She is best known for being a cast member of the APCA award winner show Comédia MTV as well as the host, alongside the actor Bento Ribeiro, of Furo MTV.

She was married to the comedian Marcelo Adnet. They divorced in 2017.

On March 18, 2013, Calabresa made her official debut on the weekly show Custe o Que Custar (a Brazilian version of the Argentine comedic news program Caiga Quien Caiga) aired on Band and TBS.

== Career ==
Dani Calabresa is currently part of Globo TV's Zorra, a comedy show mainly composed of short sketches.

== Filmography ==
=== Television ===
Year	Title	Role	Notes
2007	Pânico na TV	Reporter	
2007	Sem Controle	Various	Main cast
2008	Quinta Categoria	Herself	Main cast (improvisational comedy show)
2009	Furfles on the Beach	Various	Main cast
2009	Furfles MTV	Various	Main cast
2009–2012	Furo MTV	Host	Main role
2010–2011	Comédia MTV	Various	Main cast
2012	Comédia Ao Vivo	Various	Main cast (live show)
2013	Verão de Casal	Various	Main role
2013–2014	Custe o Que Custar	Reporter	Main cast
2015–present	Zorra	Various	Main cast (comedy show)

=== Movies ===
Year	Title	Role
2011	Cilada.com	Regina Kelly
2011	Onde Está a Felicidade?	Tiana
2015	Superpai	Júlia
2015	Inside Out	Disgust (voice)
2015	A Esperança é a Última que Morre	Hortência Jardim
2016	The Angry Birds Movie	Matilda (voice)
2016	Desculpe o Transtorno	Viviane
2018	O Homem Perfeito	Paula Varjão
2018	Maybe a Love Story	Lisa
2018	Exterminadores do Além Contra a Loira do Banheiro	Caroline
2019	O Amor Dá Trabalho	Atena
2019	The Secret Life of Pets 2	Daisy (voice)
2019	The Angry Birds Movie 2	Matilda (voice)
2022	O Palestrante	Denise
2024	Inside Out 2	Disgust (voice)
