= Os Penetras =

- Theatrical Release Poster
- Directed by: Andrucha Waddington
- Written by: Marcelo Vindicato
- Story by: Andrucha Waddington
- Produced by: Andrucha Waddington; Eliana Soárez
- Starring: Marcelo Adnet; Mariana Ximenes; Eduardo Sterblitch
- Cinematography: Ricardo Della Rosa
- Edited by: Sérgio Mekler
- Music by: Dudu Marote
- Production companies: Conspiração Filmes; Globo Filmes; Teleimage
- Distributed by: Warner Bros. Pictures
- Release date: 30 November 2012
- Country: Brazil
- Language: Portuguese
- Box office: $12.8 million

Os Penetras (English: Party Crashers) is a 2012 Brazilian comedy film directed by Andrucha Waddington and released on November 30, 2012. A sequel, Os Penetras 2 – Quem Dá Mais? was released in 2017.

== Plot ==
Marcos and Beto meet when crashing a private New Year's Eve party, and subsequently go on a three-day adventure.

== Cast ==
- Marcelo Adnet as Marco Polo
- Mariana Ximenes as Outra Laura
- Eduardo Sterblitch as Beto
- Stepan Nercessian as Nelson
- Elena Sopova as Svetlana
- Susana Vieira as Ivone
- Luis Gustavo as Anchieta
- Luís Carlos Miele as Cordeiro
- Andrea Beltrão as Falsa Laura
- Xando Graça as Guarda Valdeci
- Babu Santana as Guarda Adelair
- Eduardo Dussek as Helinho Zambuja
- Kate Lyra as Mãe Estrangeira
- Kristina Hem Bollingmo as Filha Estrangeira
