= Cilada.com =

2011 Brazilian film

- Film poster
- Directed by: José Alvarenga Jr.
- Written by: Rosana Ferrão; Bruno Mazzeo
- Produced by: Augusto Casé
- Starring: Bruno Mazzeo
- Cinematography: Nonato Estrela
- Edited by: Marcelo Moraes
- Music by: Plinio Profeta
- Distributed by: Downtown Filmes
- Release date: 8 July 2011
- Running time: 95 minutes
- Country: Brazil
- Language: Portuguese
- Box office: $14.58 million

Cilada.com is a 2011 Brazilian comedy film directed by José Alvarenga Jr. and starring Bruno Mazzeo, who also co-wrote the screenplay. Inspired by the sitcom Cilada which also starred Mazzeo, it was released on 8 July 2011 in Brazil. Earning over $14.5 million, Cilada.com is the highest-grossing Brazilian film of 2011. However, it did not reach the year's top fifteen highest grossing films overall in the country.

== Cast ==
- Bruno Mazzeo as Bruno
- Fernanda Paes Leme as Fernanda
- Augusto Madeira as Sandro
- Carol Castro as Mônica
- Fabiula Nascimento as Suzy
- Fúlvio Stefanini as Dr. Leoni
- Sérgio Loroza as Marco 'Marconha' André (as Serjão Loroza)
- Thelmo Fernandes as Gerson
- Dani Calabresa as Regina Kelly
- Luis Miranda as Pai Amâncio
- Alexandre Nero as Henrique
- Fernando Caruso as himself
- Marcos Caruso as Camargo
- Rita Elmôr as Ferrari

== Release ==
=== Box office ===
The film grossed $13,874,130 in Brazil, and $14,576,408 worldwide. It was the highest-grossing Brazilian film released in 2011, though it was not able to reach the top fifteen highest-grossing films overall in Brazil, with the country's box office dominated by foreign films.

== Home media ==
Cilada.com was released on both DVD and Blu-ray in Brazil on 13 February 2012.
