= Juacas =

Brazilian television series

- Genre: Action comedy
- Created by: Carina Schulze
- Directed by: Juliana Vonlanten
- Starring: André Lamoglia; Bruno Astuti; Marino Canguçú; Eike Duarte; Juan Ciancio; Rafael Castro
- Country of origin: Brazil
- Original language: Portuguese
- No. of seasons: 2
- No. of episodes: 52

Production
- Running time: 30 Minutes
- Production companies: Chatrone; Cinefilm

Original release
- Network: Disney Channel
- Release: 3 June 2017 – 30 August 2019

Related
- High School Musical: A Seleção

Juacas is a Brazilian television series created by Carina Schulze and produced by Chatrone and Cinefilm and broadcast by Disney Channel Brazil. It is the second original national series produced by Disney Channel in Brazil, after Que Talento!. The story combines comedy, action, and romance. The series premiered on July 3, 2017 in Latin America and Italy, through closed channels on Disney Channel and Disney XD. The series was shown from October 21, 2017 to January 14, 2018, in the children's programming block Mundo Disney, on SBT. In Portugal, it debuted on May 14, 2018 through the closed channel SIC K. Shortly after the end of the series, it was made available on the service of Claro and Net, Now. On August 4, 2018, the series was made available on Netflix.

== Synopsis ==
Every year, in the middle of the Brazilian holiday season, CAOSS is held, a surfing championship that attracts thousands of tourists and hundreds of young people dreaming of becoming professional surfers. The team that wins the tournament gets a passport to compete professionally. At the beginning of the series, Rafa (André Lamoglia) escapes from the summer course imposed by his businessman father to try to win the CAOSS tournament. He forms his team including Billy (Bruno Astuti) and Jojo (Marino Cangucu) and that will eventually be called Juacas. The Red Sharks team is the main rival.

== Cast ==
=== Main ===
- André Lamoglia as Rafael Santos Moreira (Rafa Smor)
- Bruno Astuti as Bernardo de Souza (Billy)
- Marino Canguçú as João Joilton Mineiro (Jojó)
- Eike Duarte as Marcelo Mahla (season 1)
- Juan Ciancio as Sebastián López (Seba)
- Rafael Castro as Mario de Lima (Minhoca)
- Larissa Murai as Leilane Villanova
- Isabela Souza as Brida Januário (season 1; guest season 2)
- Mari Azevedo as Viviane Leme (Vivi)
- Nuno Leal Mai as Augusto Juaca
- Suzy Rêgo as Janice Januário (Juma)
- Teco Padaratz as Cézar Maral (Cezinha)
- Clara Caldas as Kátia Kameha Juaca (Kika)
- Guilherme Seta as Toco Maral
- Mateus Mahmoud as Guga
- Eduardo Gil as Pigmeu
- Fellipe Guadanucci as Robert Nisson
- Gabriel Chadan as Marcelo Mahla (season 2)
- Carolina Oliveira as Nanda (season 2)
- Gabriel Falcão as Enzo (season 2)
- Branca Previliato as Giuliana (season 2)
- Iran Malfitano as Marcondes Juaca / Kaike Gazin (season 2)
