= Chico Anysio =

Brazilian actor and comedian (1931–2012)

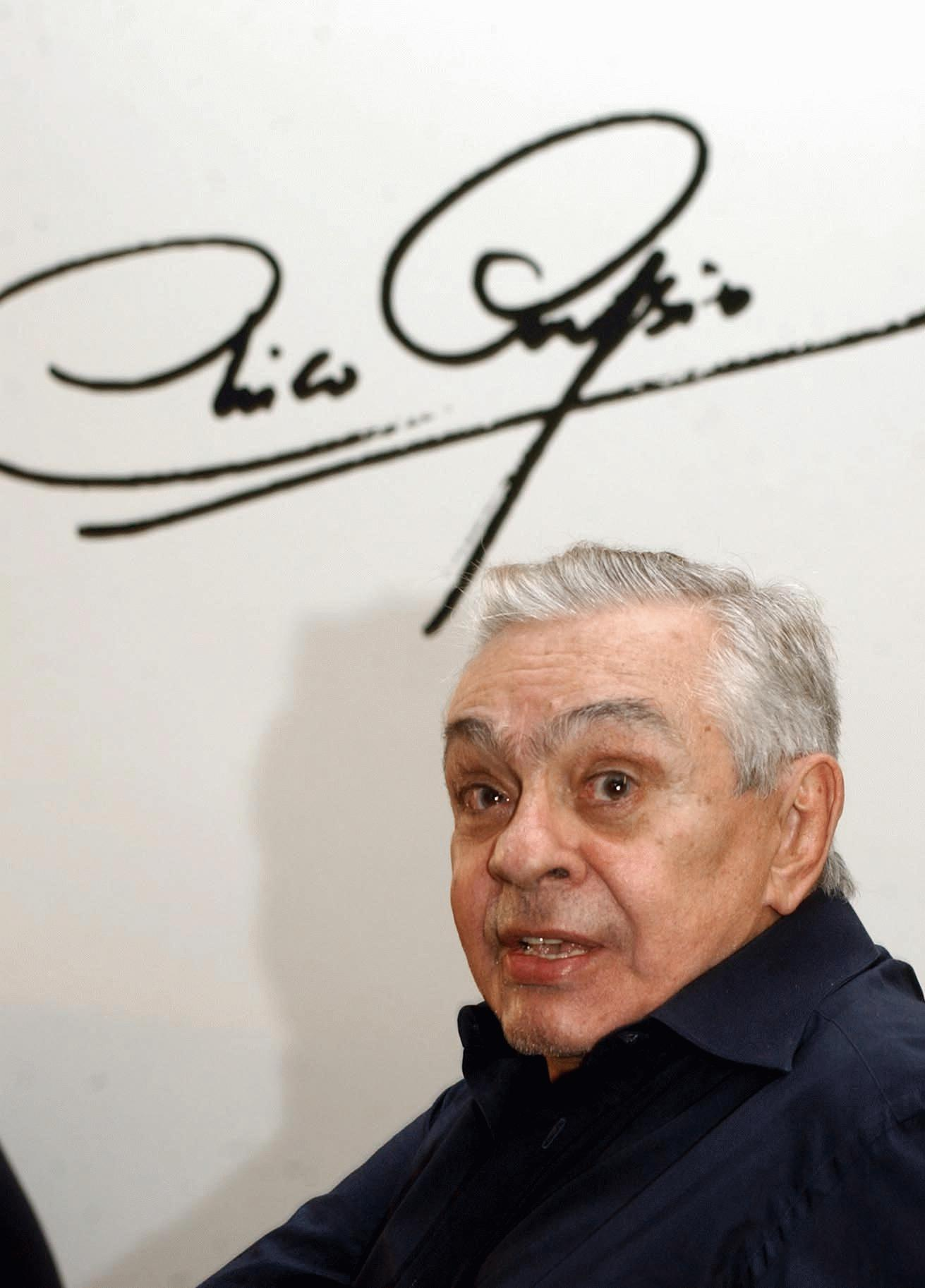
- Born: Francisco Anysio de Oliveira Paula Filho; 12 April 1931; Maranguape, Ceará, Brazil
- Died: 23 March 2012 (aged 80); Rio de Janeiro, Brazil
- Occupation(s): Actor, comedian, writer, humorist and composer
- Known for: Chico City; Chico Total; Chico Anysio Show; Escolinha do Professor Raimundo
- Spouses: Nancy Wanderley, Rose Rondelli, Regina Chaves, Alcione Mazzeo, Zélia Cardoso de Mello, Malga Di Paula

Chico Anysio (born Francisco Anysio de Oliveira Paula Filho, 12 April 1931 – 23 March 2012) was a Brazilian actor, comedian, writer and composer.

== Biography ==
Anysio was born in Maranguape, Ceará. He moved with the family to Rio de Janeiro when he was 7 years old, and tried to work on Rádio Guanabara. He joined Rede Globo in 1969, which achieved the status of a star cast that boasted the most famous artists of Brazil.

Anysio was one of the most famous Brazilian comedians of all time and is considered the greatest Brazilian comedian ever. He died on 23 March 2012, aged 80, in Samaritano Hospital, Rio de Janeiro, from multiple organ failure.

=== Private life ===
He was the brother of actress Lupe Gigliotti, of director Zelito Viana and composer and Radio-producer Elano de Paula and father of actors Lug de Paula, Nizo Neto and DJ Cícero Chaves, born from marriage with Regina Chaves. His last wife was the manager Malga Di Paula. Regarding religion Anysio was a vocal atheist.

== Filmography ==
=== Film ===
Year	Title	Role	Notes
1959	O Primo do Cangaceiro	Cincinato	
1959	Mulheres à Vista		
1959	Eu Sou o Tal	Dr. Republicano Nepomuceno	
1959	Entrei de Gaiato	Januário's friend	
1960	Pequeno por Fora		
1960	O Palhaço O Que É?		
1960	Cacareco Vem Aí	Entrevistador	
1971	O Doce Esporte do Sexo	Various roles	
1981	O Mundo Mágico dos Trapalhões	Narrator	
1987	Tanga		
1996	Tieta of Agreste	Zé Esteves	
2001	Trepa nas Estrelas	Jumbo Culano	
2009	Se Eu Fosse Você 2	Olavo	
2009	Hermanoteu na Terra de Godah	God	
2009	Up	Carl Fredricksen	Voice in Brazilian dubbing
2009	Simonal – Ninguém Sabe o Duro que Dei	Entrevistador	
2010	Os Sonhos de um Sonhador: A História de Frank Aguiar	Alemão	
2010	Uma Professora Muito Maluquinha	Monsenhor Aristides	
2011	A Hora e a Vez de Augusto Matraga	Major Consilva	Final film role

=== Television ===
Year	Title	Role	Notes
1973–1980	Chico City	Various	
1982–1990	Chico Anysio Show	Various	
1984–1993	Os Trapalhões	Himself	Guest appearances
1989	Que Rei Sou Eu?	Taji Namas	
1990–1991	Os Trapalhões	Himself	Creation supervisor
1990–1992	Som Brasil	Himself	
1990–2002	Escolinha do Professor Raimundo	Professor Raimundo	
1991	Estados Anysios de Chico City	Various	
1995	Chico Total	Various	
1995	Engraçadinha, Seus Amores e Seus Pecados	Vendor	
1999–2002	Zorra Total	Alberto Roberto / Professor Raimundo / Dr. Rosseti	
1999	Terra Nostra	Josué Medeiros	
1999	O Belo e as Feras	Various	
2002	Brava Gente	Detective Brito / Cego	
2002	Trepa nas Estrelas	Mulambo Jambo	
2004	A Diarista	Rúbio	
2005	Sítio do Picapau Amarelo	Dr. SaraIva	
2006	Sinhá Moça	Everaldo Mathias	
2007	Pé na Jaca	Ezequiel de Jesus "Cigano"	
2008	Cilada	Dep. Sandoval	
2008	Guerra e Paz	Padre Santo	
2009	Caminho das Índias	Namit Batra	
2009	Chico e Amigos	Various	
2009–2010	Zorra Total	Alberto Roberto / Justo Veríssimo / Bento Carneiro	
2011	Chico e Amigos	Various	
2011	Zorra Total	Salomé	
