= André Lamoglia =

Brazilian actor (born 1997)

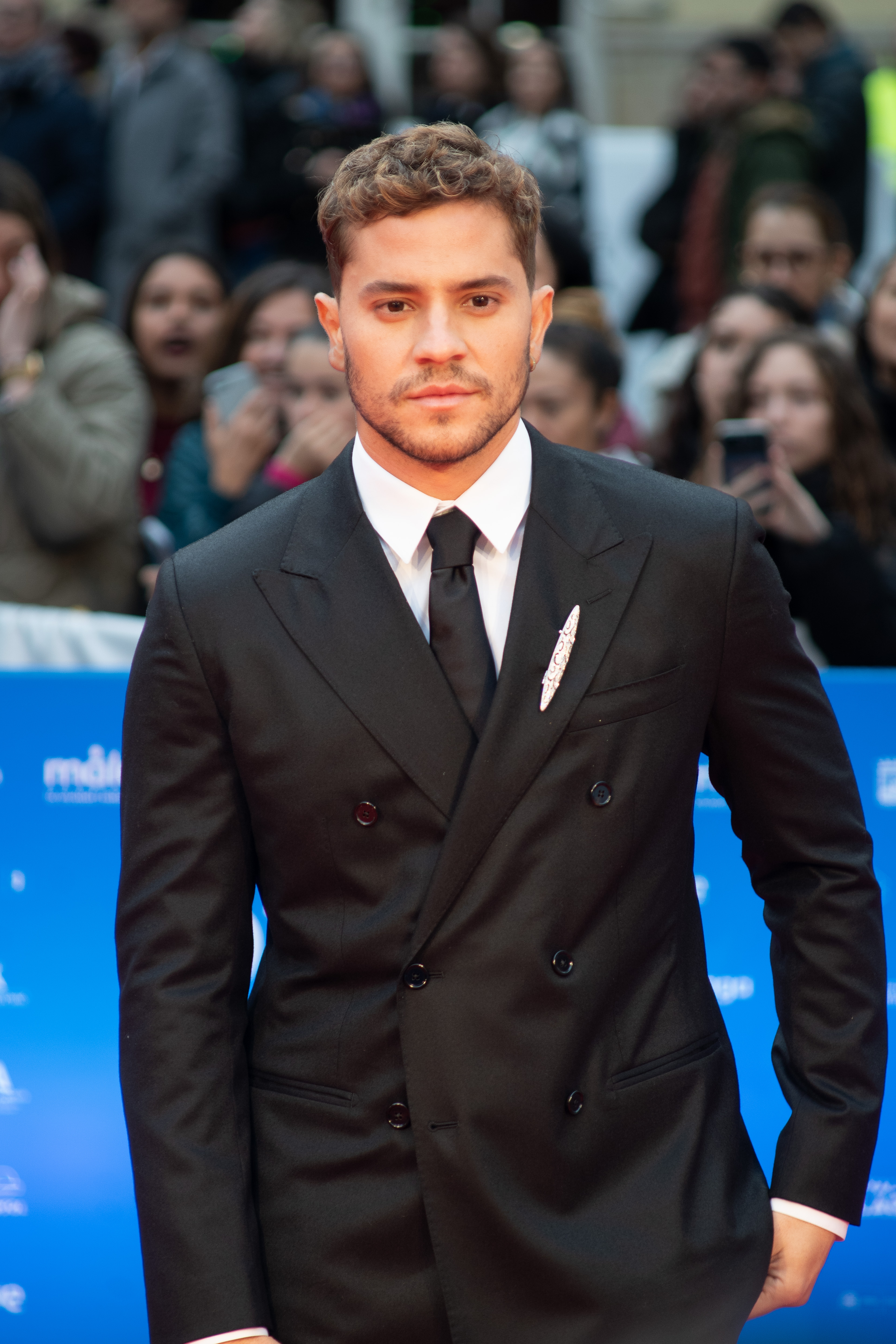
- Lamoglia in 2024
- Born: André Lamoglia Agra Gomes; 4 August 1997 (age 29); Rio de Janeiro, Brazil
- Occupation: Actor
- Years active: 2016–present

André Lamoglia Agra Gomes (born 4 August 1997) is a Brazilian actor, known for playing Rafael Smor in the Disney Channel Brazil series, Juacas and Luan in the second season of Bia. He's best known worldwide as Iván in Netflix's Elite. Since 2025, he's starred in the Brazilian Netflix drama Os Donos do Jogo; and has been praised for both his acting and on-screen chemistry with co-star Mel Maia.

== Filmography ==
=== Television ===
Year	Title	Role	Comments
2016	Segredos de Justiça	Tomáz Pachá	Supporting character
2017	1 Contra Todos	Zévio's friend	Participation
2017	Detetives Do Prédio Azul	Bóris	Participation
2017	Rock Story	Boy at party	Participation
2017–2019	Juacas	Rafa Smor	Main character
2020	Bia	Luan	Main cast (season 2)
2021	Bia: Un mundo al revés	Luan	Main cast (special episode)
2022–2024	Élite	Iván Carvalho	Main cast (season 5–8); 32 episodes
2024	Blood & Water	Iván Carvalho	Main cast (season 4); 3 episodes
2025	Rulers of Fortune	Profeta	Main cast; 8 episodes

=== Movies ===
Year	Title	Role	Director
2019	Eu Sou Mais Eu	Vítor	Pedro Amorim
2019	The Traitor	Felipe	Marco Bellocchio

=== Music videos ===
Year	Title	Role	Artist
2020	"Inolvidable"	Giulia Be's love interest	Giulia Be
