= Agamenon: The Film =

2012 film by Victor Lopes

- Based on: Casseta e Planeta
- Production company: Globo
- Distributed by: Globo
- Release date: 2012
- Country: Brazil

Agamenon: The Film (Portuguese: As Aventuras de Agamenon, o Repórter) is a 2012 Brazilian comedy film directed by Victor Lopes. It stars Marcelo Adnet, Luana Piovani, Fernanda Montenegro, Hubert, and Cláudio Tovar.
