= The End (Brazilian TV series) =

Brazilian TV show

- Fim
- Genre: Drama
- Created by: Fernanda Torres
- Based on: Fim by Fernanda Torres
- Written by: Fernanda Torres
- Directed by: Andrucha Waddington
- Starring: Fábio Assunção; Marjorie Estiano; Emilio Dantas; David Junior; Heloísa Jorge; Bruno Mazzeo; Laila Garin; Débora Falabella; Thelmo Fernandes
- Opening theme: Instrumental
- Ending theme: Divino Maravilhoso by Gal Costa
- Country of origin: Brazil
- Original language: Portuguese
- No. of seasons: 1
- No. of episodes: 10

Production
- Camera setup: Single-camera
- Running time: 30–40 minutes
- Production company: Globoplay

Original release
- Network: TV Globo; Globoplay
- Release: 25 October 2023

The End (Portuguese: Fim) is a Brazilian miniseries produced by Globoplay based on the book of the same name written by actress and writer Fernanda Torres. The production premiered on October 25, 2023, on the streaming service.

Created and written by Fernanda Torres, with adaptation supervision by Maria Camargo. Directed by Andrucha Waddington and Daniela Thomas.

The series features performances by Fábio Assunção, Marjorie Estiano, Emilio Dantas, Débora Falabella, Thelmo Fernandes, Bruno Mazzeo, David Junior, Heloísa Jorge, and Laila Garin in the leading roles.

== Plot ==
The plot takes place between 1968 and 2012 and is divided into four phases covering the characters' youth, maturity, and old age. Over the decades, they share loves, betrayals, heartbreaks, joys, quirks, follies, and frustrations.

== Cast ==
Actor	Role
Fábio Assunção	Ciro Alcântara de Moraes
Marjorie Estiano	Ruth Alcântara
Emilio Dantas	Marco Ribeiro
Débora Falabella	Irene
Bruno Mazzeo	Silvio
Thelmo Fernandes	Álvaro
David Junior	Neto
Heloísa Jorge	Célia
Laila Garin	Norma
Fernanda Torres	Celeste Ribeiro
João Vitor Silva	Inácio
Javier Drolas	Padre Graça

=== Special appearances ===
Actor	Role
Valentina Herszage	Maria Clara
Zezé Motta	Dona Neusa
Ary Fontoura	Seu Vitor
Samuel Melo	Murilo
Stepan Nercessian	Sampaio
Giovanna Rispoli	Sandra
Amanda de Godoi	Nina
Guilhermina Libanio	Cinira
Marcos Pasquim	Jairo
Othon Bastos	Padre Marcos
Lara Tremouroux	Rita
Viviane Santos	Dalva
Mayana Neiva	Milena
João Fenerich	Carlos
Marina Provenzzano	Brites
Joelson Medeiros	Júlio
Pedro Nercessian	Ricardinho
Tainá Medina	Suzana
Joaquim Waddington	João
Márcio Regaleira	Juliano

== Production ==
In August 2018, the series was first mentioned in the press. It was in November of that year that the first names began to surface, with Otávio Müller being invited to appear in Fim*, a Globo miniseries. However, the negotiations did not move forward.

In 2019, rumors about the series began circulating again. At the time, Marjorie Estiano was set to star in O Selvagem da Ópera, a miniseries by Maria Adelaide Amaral about the Brazilian opera composer Carlos Gomes, but the actress left the cast to star in Fim, becoming the first confirmed cast member for the project. While still in negotiations for the second season of the series Filhos da Pátria, Bruno Mazzeo was cast in the series.

In early 2020, Valentina Herszage, fresh off the miniseries Hebe, and David Junior, who was still appearing in soap opera Bom Sucesso, were confirmed for the cast. Shortly thereafter, Zezé Motta and Alessandra Negrini were also cast in the production. Fábio Assunção took on the role of Ciro, the protagonist, even beginning to prepare for the role by losing 27 kilograms. Already on the air with the miniseries Todas as Mulheres do Mundo, Emilio Dantas was also confirmed for the series.

In April 2020, Fim was already in its second week of filming when production was suspended due to the COVID-19 pandemic in Brazil, leading to the postponement of production until 2021. However, after several delays, the series’ crew filmed the scenes in 2022, taking 14 weeks and covering approximately 290 locations.

Due to delays, Alessandra Negrini left the production because of a scheduling conflict between the Globoplay series and the filming of Netflix’s, Invisible City, and was replaced by actress Débora Falabella in the role of Irene.

== Reception ==
=== Critics ===
Journalist Joyce Pascowitch, in a post on her blog on Universo Online, gave the series a mixed review, saying, “Amid all that frustration and those dysfunctional couples, I found myself sinking deeper and deeper into a state of distress. I kept thinking about those passions, those orgies, that unbridled snorting of cocaine, all that whiskey. [...] I celebrate ‘Fim’ as a work of art. But the truth is too harsh to be viewed that way". Danilo Casaletti, writing for the newspaper O Estado de S. Paulo, gave the series a positive review, saying that it “captured the book’s ‘Rodriguean’ atmosphere”.

Celia Musilli, writing in the Folha de Londrina newspaper, gave the series a positive review, noting that “Fim explores love and loss, friendship and rivalry, freedom and risk, life and death. I highly recommend it!”. Walter Félix, from the website NaTelinha, praised the series and said it is a major asset for Globoplay: “It’s a sign that the platform is improving with every new release and has long since ceased to be merely an online archive of past TV shows.”

=== Prizes ===
Year	Awards Ceremony	Category	Nomine(es)	Result	Ref.
2023	APCA Television Award	Series – Fiction	Fernanda Torres	Nominated	
2023	APCA Television Award	Best Actor	Bruno Mazzeo	Nominated	
2023	APCA Television Award	Best Actress	Marjorie Estiano	Nominated	
2024	ABC Prize (Brazilian Cinematography Association)	Best Cinematography in a TV Series	Fernando Young, ABC, Lula Cerri, ABC and Paulo Brakarz	Nominated	
2024	ABC Prize (Brazilian Cinematography Association)	Best Sound in a TV Series	Jorge Saldanha, ABC, Gabriela Bervian, Pedro Saldanha, Alessandro Laroca, Guilherme Marinho and Eduardo Virmond	Nominated	
2024	Brazilian Academy Film Awards	Best Fiction Series	Fernanda Torres	Nominated	
2024	Brazilian Academy Film Awards	Best Actor in a Drama Series	Bruno Mazzeo	Nominated	
2024	Brazilian Academy Film Awards	Best Actor in a Drama Series	Fábio Assunção	Nominated	
2024	Brazilian Academy Film Awards	Best Actress in a Drama Series	Marjorie Estiano	Nominated	
2024	Melhores do Ano	Series of the Year	Fim	Nominated	
2024	Melhores do Ano	Best Actress in a TV Series	Marjorie Estiano	Won	
2024	SEC Awards	National Series of the Year	Fim	Nominated	
2024	SEC Awards	Best Actress in a Domestic Series	Marjorie Estiano	Nominated	
