= Heloísa Jorge =

Angolan actress and film director (born 1984)

- Born: 1 July 1984 (age 42); Chitato, Lunda Norte, Angola
- Education: Federal University of Bahia
- Occupations: Actress, film director
- Years active: 2012–present

Heloísa Jorge (born 1 July 1984) is an Angolan actress and film director.

== Biography ==
Born in the municipality of Chitato, in Lunda Norte Province, Jorge is the daughter of a Brazilian father and Angolan mother, and she has a brother. She described herself as a shy child who had difficulty with public speaking. At the age of 12, she moved to Brazil with her family to escape the Angolan Civil War, first settling in Montes Claros. Jorge began taking theater classes at school and became part of a group. When she took the Brazilian university entrance examination at age 18, she decided to study performing arts. Jorge moved to Salvador, Bahia to attend the Federal University of Bahia.

While taking her theater courses, Jorge began to learn about social movements and improve her self-esteem. In 2007, she was nominated for the Braskem Award for her performance in the play O Dia 14, directed by Ângelo Flávio. Also in 2007, Jorge wrote the play Uma Mulher Vestida de Sol, in honor of Ariano Suassuna. She graduated with a performing arts degree in 2008. In 2009, Jorge was again nominated for the Braskem Award for her performance in A Farsa da Boa Preguiça, directed by Harildo Deda. She returned to Angola in 2009 with her theater group, performing the play Amêsa by José Mena Abrantes.

In 2012, Jorge was cast as Fabiana in the TV series Gabriela. She was invited to join the Angolan TV series Jikulumessu, which promoted black power, in 2014. The same year, Jorge hosted the Globo International Connections program. In 2016, she played the slave Luanda in the show Liberdade, Liberdade. Jorge portrayed the dying mother Gilda Cunha Matheus in the 2019 soap opera A Dona do Pedaço.

== Filmography ==
=== Television ===
Year	Title	Role	Notes
2012	Gabriela	Fabiana	
2014	Jikulumessu	Djamila Pereira	
2016	Liberdade, Liberdade	Luanda dos Santos	
2017	A Lei do Amor	Laura Correia da Silva	Episodes: "16 de janeiro–31 de março"
2017–18	Sob Pressão	Jaqueline Vaz	Seasons 1–2
2019	A Dona do Pedaço	Gilda Cunha Matheus	
2023	The End	Célia	

=== Films ===
Year	Title	Role	Notes
2015	Se te Queres Matar, Mata-te		
2017	Casca de Baobá	Maria	
2018	Bate Coração	Dr. Claudia	
TBA	Sujeito Oculto		
