= Galinha Pintadinha =

Brazilian children's music project

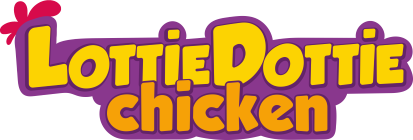
- Logo Lottie Dottie Chicken 2022
- Created by: Juliano Prado, Marcos Luporini
- Original work: Brazil
- Owner: Bromelia Produções
- Years: 2006–present

Official website
- Official website

Galinha Pintadinha, (English translation: Little Dappled Chicken) also known in English-speaking territories as "Lottie Dottie Chicken" is a Brazilian media franchise for children's music, created by Juliano Prado and Marcos Luporini, and animated by Bromelia Produções. The songs are originally in Portuguese and receive millions of views on YouTube. Some of the songs have been translated into Spanish, English, French, Italian, German, Chinese and other languages. There will also be an upcoming movie, scheduled this year for release in Brazil.

== History ==
On December 28, 2006, Juliano Prado and Marcos Luporini added a children's animation to the YouTube website for presentation to some producers of a children's channel in São Paulo, as they would not be able to attend the meeting. Executives did not approve the video and the initial idea did not come to fruition. However, six months later, the duo, who had not removed the video from the website, realized that the number of views was quite significant on their video, around 500 thousand.

In 2013, the animated music videos premiered on Netflix in several countries including in the Brazil, United Kingdom, United States, Canada and Spanish Latin American countries. In 2015, its studio occupied the 89th position as one of the 150 biggest licensed brands in the world, ranking published by the British magazine License! Global.

In 2017, an animated webseries called Lottie Dottie Mini was released on their own Youtube channel, separate from main channel. This webseries was later added to the Netflix catalog, and also the TV channels TV Cultura and SBT. Parts of the series have also been released in Brazilian movie theaters, while still being uploaded online.

== Media ==
Following the release of their second album, the franchise experienced exponential growth within Brazilian children's media. This surge sparked a massive merchandising wave, including toys, backpacks, albums, books, and infant care products. Expansion quickly moved into the digital space, capturing young audiences via interactive smartphone apps and mobile games like PoChickenPo.
