= Marcelo Adnet =

Brazilian actor, comedian and VJ (born 1981)

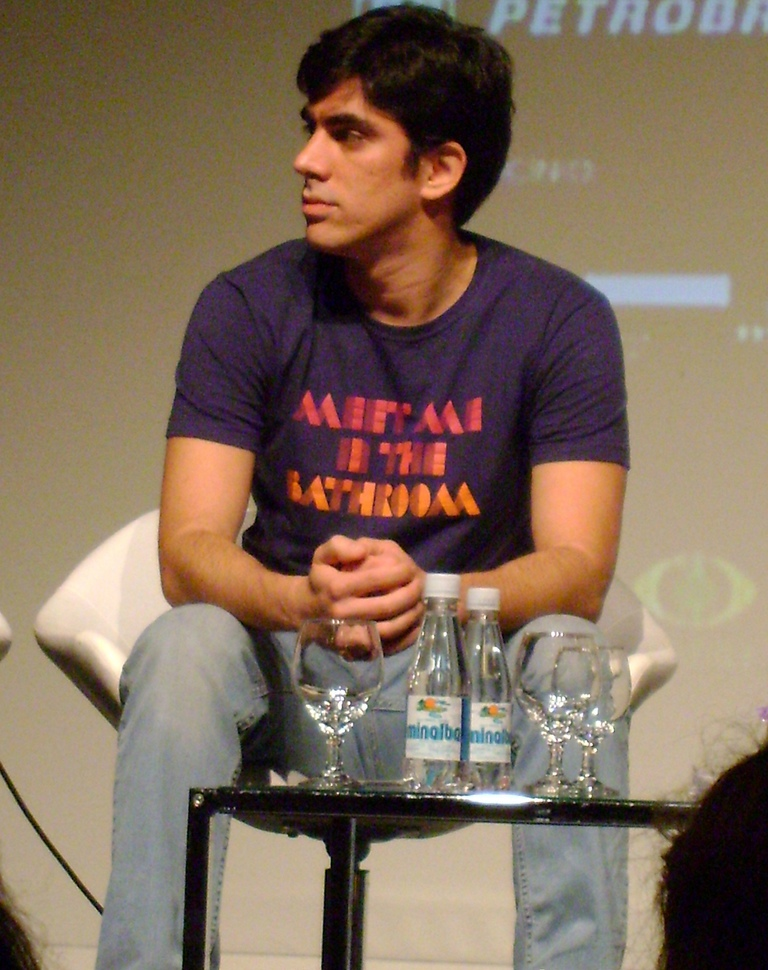
- Born: Marcelo França Adnet; September 5, 1981 (age 44); Rio de Janeiro, RJ, Brazil
- Known for: Actor, comedian, presenter
- Spouse: Dani Calabresa (m. 2010-2017)

Marcelo França Adnet (born September 5, 1981, in Rio de Janeiro) is a Brazilian actor, comedian and former VJ. He has been on many TV shows such as Adnet viaja ("Adnet travels") (2012), Adnet ao vivo ("Adnet live") (2011) and Comédia MTV ("MTV Comedy") (2010-2012). He was named by Época magazine as one of the 100 most influential Brazilians in 2009.

Adnet has a degree in journalism from PUC-Rio. His career as a comedian began while in college when a friend, the actor Fernando Caruso, invited him to make an improvisation play, Z.E. Zenas Emprovisadas, which debuted in 2003 and ran until 2012. He stands out for the imitations he often creates around famous personalities. He worked on the Multishow cable television channel, owned by Rede Globo, before going to MTV as a result of his performance in Rockgol. Marcelo was married to his former co-worker, the MTV VJ and comedian Dani Calabresa. In January 2013, Adnet was hired by TV Globo.

== Filmography ==
=== Films ===
Year	Title	Role	Notes
2006	Pé na Jaca	Doutor	Brazilian soap opera
2007	Podecrer!	Tavico	Brazilian movie
2007	Xuxa Em Sonho de Menina	Elói	Brazilian movie
2008	O Diário de Tati	Maurinho	Brazilian movie
2008	Polaróides Urbanas	Taxi Driver	Brazilian movie
2008	Apenas o Fim	-	Uncredited
2009	A Mulher Invisível	Jeferson	Brazilian movie
2010	Muita Calma Nessa Hora	Augusto Henrique	Brazilian movie
2011	Heleno	-	Brazilian movie
2011	Onde Está A Felicidade?	Nestor	Brazilian movie
2011	Zookeeper	Donald, Bernie, Joe, Barry and Bruce	Voice on the Brazilian dub
2012	As Aventuras de Agamenon, o Repórter	Agamenon	Brazilian movie
2012	Os Penetras	Marco Polo	Brazilian movie
2014	Muita Calma Nessa Hora 2	Augusto Henrique	Brazilian movie
2016	Tô Ryca	Falácio Fausto	Brazilian movie
2016	The Angry Birds Movie	Red	Voice on the Brazilian dub
2017	Os Penetras 2 – Quem Dá Mais?	Marco Polo Azevedo	Brazilian movie
2019	The Angry Birds Movie 2	Red	Voice on the Brazilian dub
2022	The Amazing Maurice	Maurice	Voice on the Brazilian dub
2023	Nas Ondas da Fé	Hickson	Also screenwriter
2023	Fervo	Marcelo (Clerk)	Brazilian movie
2023	Wish	Valentino	Voice on the Brazilian dub

=== Television ===
Year	Title	Role	Notes
2025	Pablo & Luisão	Bigode	Episode: "Avestruz Maxx"
2026	Brazil 70: The Third Star	Eusébio Teixeira	
