= Quem (magazine) =

Brazilian magazine

- Editorial director: Camila Borowsky
- Categories: Entertainment
- Publisher: Editora Globo
- First issue: 2000
- Country: Brazil
- Based in: Rio de Janeiro
- Language: Portuguese
- Website: Quem

Quem (also called Quem Acontece) is a magazine published in Brazil by Editora Globo, a magazine focusing on subjects about celebrities in evidence from the national and even international scene.

The magazine was published in print until July 2017, when Editora Globo announced its end. The last print edition was 878, published on June 28, 2017. From that date, Quem started to focus on its online portal, publishing weekly interviews with entertainment personalities. With the creation of the Globo + app, which brings together all Infoglobo publications, Quem has been published again in magazine format.
