= Os Donos do Jogo =

Brazilian television series

Os Donos do Jogo (Rulers of Fortune) is a Brazilian drama and crime series that was launched at Netflix on October 29, 2025. This series follows a rising crime lord named Profeta, who wants to control the illegal gambling sector in Rio de Janeiro.

== Cast ==
- André Lamoglia as Jefferson Moraes Guerra (a.k.a. "Profeta"), a rising bicheiro (an illegal gambling operator who controls the Jogo do Bicho, a Brazilian illegal gambling game) from Campos dos Goytacazes and heir of the Moraes Family (a gambling dynasty from Rio de Janeiro's countryside) who goes to Rio de Janeiro with the goal of dominating the Rio de Janeiro's Jogo do Bicho's scene and becoming the most powerful Jogo do Bicho's boss in the state.
- Juliana Paes as Leila Fernandez, a powerful gambling boss who is considered the most powerful woman in Rio de Janeiro's Jogo do Bicho scene. Married to Galego Fernandez, a powerful gambling boss of foreign origin and head of Fernandez Family, hides a huge secret that could change the things in the Jogo do Bicho scene forever.
- Fabien Caleyre as Laurent La Croix, a French businessman who travels to Brazil interested in the Brazilian betting scene.
- Chico Díaz as Galego Fernandez, a powerful gambling boss of foreign origin, patriarch/head of the Fernandez Family (one of the most powerful families in the Rio de Janeiro's Jogo do Bicho scene) and leader of the top echelons of the Rio de Janeiro's Jogo do Bicho operation.
- Xamã as Victor Guerra (a.k.a. "Buffalo"), a ruthless former fighter and bicheiro who becomes a member of the Guerra Family (one of the most powerful families in the Jogo do Bicho scene) by marrying Susana Guerra, the eldest daughter of Jorge Guerra, head of the Guerra Family. He also becomes the Prophet's archenemy as both begin to fight hand-to-hand for the control of several Jogo do Bicho places.
- Giullia Buscacio as Susana Guerra, the eldest daughter of Jorge Guerra, older sister of Mirna Guerra, sister-in-law of Profeta, and wife of Bufalo. Married to Bufalo and with ambitions of her own, she finds herself in a delicate position amidst the dispute between her husband and her brother-in-law, in addition to becoming the arch-rival of her own younger sister.
- Mel Maia as Mirna Guerra Moraes, the sexy youngest daughter of Jorge Guerra, younger sister of Susana Guerra, sister-in-law of Bufalo, and girlfriend-turned-fiancée of Profeta. Considered the most ambitious member of the Guerra family, she will do anything to become the most powerful woman in the Jogo do Bicho scene, which puts her in conflict with her older sister, Susana Guerra. She falls in love with Profeta (the heir of Moraes Family) and ends up starting a romance that will change the rules of the Jogo do Bicho forever.
- Bruno Mazzeo as Renzo Saad.
