= Lucy (footballer) =

Brazilian footballer

Personal information
- Full name: Maria Lúcia Alves Feitosa
- Date of birth: 24 August 1960 (age 66)
- Place of birth: Triunfo, Pernambuco, Brazil
- Position: Midfielder

International career
Years	Team	Apps	(Gls)
- Brazil

Maria Lúcia Alves Feitosa (born August 24, 1960), better known by her nickname Lucy, is a Brazilian former international football Midfielder who last played for A.C.F. Trani 80. During her career she has played in the Brazilian and Italian leagues.

== International career ==
Feitosa represented Brazil at the 1988 FIFA Women's Invitation Tournament.
