= 9mm: São Paulo =

Brazilian crime drama television series

- Genre: Crime drama
- Starring: Norival Rizzo; Luciano Quirino; Clarissa Kiste; Nicolas Trevijano; Vinícius Ricci
- Country of origin: Brazil
- Original language: Portuguese
- No. of seasons: 2
- No. of episodes: 20

Production
- Production location: São Paulo
- Cinematography: Pedro Molinos
- Running time: 45 minutes
- Production companies: Moonshot Pictures; Fox Networks Group

Original release
- Network: Fox Channel (Latin America)
- Release: June 10, 2008 – July 26, 2011

9mm: São Paulo is a Brazilian crime drama television series produced by Fox Networks Group in partnership with Moonshot Pictures and released on June 10, 2008.

The series was created by Roberto D'avila, Newton Cannito and journalist Carlos Amorim, author of the book "CV PCC - A Irmandade do Crime" and is the first Fox Channel Latin America original series produced in Brazil.

== Premise ==
Inspired by real police cases the series follows the daily life of the homicide division of São Paulo and the police team formed by the protagonists Horácio, Eduardo, Luísa, Tavares and 3P.

== Cast ==
- Norival Rizzo as Horácio Pereira
- Luciano Quirino as Eduardo Vilaverde
- Clarissa Kiste as Luísa Camargo
- Nicolas Trevijano as 3P (Pedro Paulo Pacheco)
- Vinícius Ricci as Gilson

== Interesting facts ==
- Some episodes from the series were used in Envydust music video "Senhoras e Senhores".
