= A Diarista =

- Created by: Aloísio de Abreu; Bruno Mazzeo
- Directed by: José Alvarenga Jr.
- Starring: Cláudia Rodrigues; Dira Paes; Cláudia Mello; Helena Fernandes; Sérgio Loroza; Renata Castro Barbosa; Leandro Firmino
- Opening theme: "Dona da Banca" by Aleh
- Country of origin: Brazil
- Original language: Portuguese
- No. of seasons: 4
- No. of episodes: 119

Production
- Production locations: Rio de Janeiro, Brazil
- Running time: 30 minutes

Original release
- Network: Globo Network; Globo International
- Release: 13 April 2004 – 31 July 2007

A Diarista (in Portuguese, literally "The Daily Help") is a Brazilian television sitcom directed by José Alvarenga Jr. and written by Aloísio de Abreu and Bruno Mazzeo. The series aired from 13 April 2004 to 31 July 2007 on Rede Globo.

== Plot ==
It shows the life and problems of Marinete (Cláudia Rodrigues), a cleaning lady with a short temper. She always ends up depending on her friends, who are distracted by any stupid thing and leave her to solve things on her own.

== Cast ==
- Claúdia Rodrigues as Marinete / Maria Elizabeth
- Dira Paes as Solineuza / Sônia Neiva
- Sérgio Loroza as Figueirinha
- Helena Fernandes as Ipanema de Jesus (seasons 2–4)
- Cláudia Mello as Dalila
- Renata Castro Barbosa as Gislene (seasons 1–3)
- Leandro Firmino as Figueira (season 1)

== Pilot ==
The pilot episode was written by Glória Perez and was aired on 21 December 2003 on Sunday at 11:00 PM.

== Seasons ==
Season	Timeslot	Season premiere	Season finale	Episodes	TV season
1	Tuesday; 11:00 PM	13 April 2004	21 December 2004	37	2004
2	Tuesday; 11:00 PM	5 April 2005	20 December 2005	36	2005
3	Tuesday; 11:00 PM	4 April 2006	19 December 2006	31	2006
4	Tuesday; 11:00 PM	10 April 2007	31 July 2007	15	2007
