= Zorra Total =

- Genre: Comedy; Sketch comedy
- Directed by: Maurício Sherman (1999–2015); Maurício Farias (2015)
- Country of origin: Brazil
- No. of seasons: 15
- No. of episodes: +600

Production
- Running time: 55—70 minutes (with commercials)

Original release
- Network: Rede Globo
- Release: March 25, 1999 – May 2, 2015

Related
- Os Caras de Pau; A Praça é Nossa

Zorra Total was a Brazilian television comedy broadcast by TV Globo. It was launched on March 25, 1999, and has been shown on Saturdays at 10 p.m. since May 1999.

Despite being popular, Zorra is heavily criticized for its style of foolish humor, and is considered by many as one of the worst programs on Brazilian television.

== Current parts ==
=== Zorra Brasil Subway ===
This part was created based in the Brazilian president, Dilma Rousseff. Here, a parody, called "Dilmaquinista" (Fabiana Karla) (a pun in Dilma and Maquinista [Portuguese for machinist]) drives a subway train. In the subway, there are a lot of people, representing the Brazilian people. Among them are the couple Valéria (Rodrigo Sant'Anna) and Janete (Thalita Carauta) (who is often called by Valéria a baboon, weird or American [since she always says some English phrases during the comedy]). At the very end of the episode, she says, "Eu sou maquinista de primeira viagem, mas já estou pegando o jeito!" (I'm a beginner machinist, but I'm getting the hang of this!).

==== Subparts ====
- Valéria and Janete: Apparently the main part of the subway, they are two friends that are always chatting and finding new people in the subway.
- Shoo, dengue!: In this part, a young boy sprays insecticide every time someone says something that remembers dengue. This part ends with the boy saying "Shoo, dengue!".
- She's Crazy!: In this part, a woman is sitting in one of the subway's seat, when a man arrives and sits in her side. Despite the mans being totally innocent, the woman thinks they want to date her. She tells them an absurd history about how dating her will be. The mans get annoyed and go away, calling her a crazy. Then, the woman repents and try to sweetly call them back, however, this never works.
- What do you think?: In this part, two men always find a weird person in the subway, called Darci (a name for both men and women). They try to discover their gender. They tells a history that confuses the men, looking like a man and a woman, respectively. At the end, they ask a question, but the answer never answers their question. At the very end of the part, the weird person says to the audience, "And you? What do you think?"
- Who sings, the evils amazes!: This part happens in Dilmaquinista's cabin, where a reporter wants Dilmaquinista to answer some questions. She does not want to talk. However, she likes singing. She answers the questions by singing some famous song that fits with it. At the end, she says to the audience, "Who sings, the evils amaze!"
- Can't remember: In this part, two men are chatting, when one of them have something to say that the other one remembers of that. The first man needs to leave the subway, however, he remembers what it is when he leaves and screams to the other from the door. The thing shames the other man.
- Mumps Woman: A singer who always travels to other places by the subway.
- Ruan Santana: A parody of the famous Brazilian singer Luan Santana, Ruan is always trying to be unnoticed in the subway. However, a reporter always finds him.
- Song: In every episode of Zorra Total, a different person is visiting the subway (like a street-sweeper or a fortune-teller). This causes all the subway people to sing and dance a song about the person.
- Visiting the Machinist Cab: In all episodes, Valéria and Janete go to the machinist cab with a different person to help Dilmaquinista.
- Accept a Friendly Shoulder?: During this skit, there are two women chatting, and one of them tells a problem. Ombro Amigo (Friendly Shoulder) comes near the woman, just to her lean her head on his shoulder. When she does that, he says "Não perco uma!" ("I don't miss even one!")
- Lula: The ex-president Lula is in the machinist cab and tells policy and government jokes.
- The Cleaner: Lucicreide, a cleaner, is always with her friend and co-worker, talking about their lives.
- You thought wrong: Two women are chatting and one is talking about her job and how she were fired.
- Double Sense: A man says to some friends that he has gone to a funeral. He explains why the person died, however, it is not what the friends think, but another thing that is the reason of death.
- Talking to the Phone: In the women's wagon, a woman is talking to her boyfriend and four nosy women hear the talk. They start to mock her boyfriend and convince the woman to break up, not intentionally.
- Now That the Talk Was Getting Fun?!: A girl from the Four Kids skit is in the subway with her mother, when she is near a strange woman. They start to talk, but when the mother thinks the girl cannot hear something, she says that their station is coming, and they leave.
- TV in Subway: Lucicreide watches some programs with other woman, but disagrees with the host's instructions.
- Dona Santinha: Lady Kate and the Indian Tapioca finds Dona Santinha in the subway. Dona Santinha mocks her.
- Sitting and Standing: A rich man is sitting on a seat, while a poor man is standing near him. They start to talk about being poor or rich.

=== Fernandinho and Ofélia ===
In this part, a man called Fernando (Lucio Mauro) always receives visitors (which are famous people). They start to talk when his wife, Ofélia, shames him, telling offensive things for them, but not on purpose. At the end, the celebrity gets angry and goes out, making Fernandinho lose one more friend. At the very end, Ofélia says, "Eu só abro a boca quando eu tenho certeza!" (I talk only when I'm sure!).

=== Four Kids ===
In this part, there is an eight-people family (four of them are a wife, a husband and two sons, and the other part is a wife, a husband and two daughters). While the adults play cards, the kids think in something to play and start to talk. During the playing, they call their parents, to confirm something their parents said, but, on the back on the other family. The kids reveal this says and shame their parents.

=== Lady Kate ===
Lady Kate is a rich woman with a hard past. The main comedy starts when her ex-boyfriend and her enemy invade her house and mess up with her. At the very end of each episode, she says, "Eu tenho a grana, só me falta me glamour! O que que é? Eu tô pagando!" (I have all the money, missing just the glamour. What's up? I'm paying it!). She's always talking some words in wrong way.

=== Salomé and Dilma ===
Salomé (Chico Anysio) is always talking with Dilma in a telephone, just to claim about the government. At the very end of the episode, she says, "Desligou! Eu não quis ofender! Eu juro, juro..." (Hung it up! I haven't wanted to offend! I swear it, I swear it...).

== Reception ==
Mentions in lists of "worst shows".
List creator	Position
Acidez Mental	#2
Lista 10.org	#3
Questões Insanas	#9

=== Criticism ===
The show is often criticized for its style of humor, considered foolish. Since its debut in 1999, critics noted that some sketches depict controversial stereotypes about race and sexual or religious orientation of the characters, with a style considered particularly offensive.
