= Senhora (telenovela) =

- Genre: Romance
- Created by: Gilberto Braga
- Based on: Senhora by José de Alencar
- Directed by: Herval Rossano
- Starring: Norma Blum; Cláudio Marzo; Fátima Freire; Alberto Pérez; Zilka Salaberry; Osmar Prado; Paulo Ramos; Miriam Pires
- Opening theme: "Aurélia" by Orquestra Waltel Branco
- Ending theme: "Aurélia" by Orquestra Waltel Branco, and others
- Country of origin: Brazil
- Original language: Portuguese
- No. of episodes: 80

Production
- Running time: 45 minutes

Original release
- Network: TV Globo
- Release: 30 June – 17 October 1975

Senhora is a Brazilian telenovela produced and broadcast by TV Globo between 30 June and 17 October 1975, running 80 episodes. It succeeded O Noviço and preceded A Moreninha, being the sixth 6 PM telenovela broadcast by TV Globo.

It is an adaptation of the homonymous novel, by José de Alencar, being adapted by Gilberto Braga with Herval Rossano as director. It was the first color 6 pm telenovela.

It features Norma Blum, Cláudio Marzo, Fátima Freire, Alberto Pérez, Zilka Salaberry, Osmar Prado, Paulo Ramos and Miriam Pires as the main characters.

== Reruns ==
It reran for the first time between 5 April and 23 July 1976, on 3:30 pm, succeeding Helena and being preceded by its original preceder, O Noviço.

It reran for the second time on the program TV Mulher between 1 December 1980 and 6 March 1981 succeeding Uma Rosa com Amor and being preceded by Anjo Mau.

== Other adaptations ==
This is the fourth Brazilian adaptation of the novel, as TV Paulista broadcast an adaptation in 1953 and Rede Tupi broadcast two, in 1962 and 1971. The 1971 version had as director Ody Fraga with the title O Preço de um Homem. Arlete Montenegro and Adriano Reys portrayed the main characters on the 1971 version.

In 2005 Marcílio Moraes and Rosane Lima adapted Senhora, Lucíola and Diva to write the telenovela Essas Mulheres, produced by Record. Christine Fernandes and Gabriel Braga Nunes portrayed Aurélia Camargo and Fernando Seixas in this version.

In 2025, TV Globo adapted the novel, however as a plot on Garota do Momento. On it, "TV Ondas do Mar" broadcast a version of Senhora in which the characters Beatriz (Duda Santos) and Cássio Cavalcanti (Daniel Rangel) portrayed the characters Aurélia and Fernando, respectively.

== Soundtrack ==
1. "Quem Sabe?" by Francisco Petrônio and Dilermando Reis
2. "Ontem Ao Luar" by Paulo Tapajós
3. "Aurélia" by Orquestra Waltel Branco
4. "Recordando" by Orquestra Romanza

The sound design is by Paulo Ribeiro.
