= Essas Mulheres =

2005 Brazilian telenovela produced by RecordTV

- Genre: Telenovela; Drama; Romance
- Created by: Marcílio Moraes
- Based on: Senhora, Lucíola and Diva by José de Alencar
- Written by: Bosco Brasil, Cristianne Fridman and Rosane Lima
- Directed by: Flávio Colatrello Jr.
- Starring: Christine Fernandes; Carla Cabral; Miriam Freeland; Gabriel Braga Nunes; Adriana Garambone; Paulo Gorgulho; Ana Beatriz Nogueira; João Vitti
- Opening theme: "Pop Zen" by Nana Caymmi, Dori Caymmi and Danilo Caymmi
- Country of origin: Brazil
- Original language: Portuguese
- No. of episodes: 149

Production
- Production locations: São Paulo, Brazil
- Running time: 60 minutes

Original release
- Network: Record (TV network)
- Release: 2 May – 21 October 2005

Esses Mulheres (English: These Women) is a Brazilian telenovela produced by RecordTV and aired between May 2 and October 21, 2005, for a total of 149 episodes, replacing A Escrava Isaura and being replaced by Prova de Amor. It was the second soap opera produced by the broadcaster since it resumed drama in 2004. It was based on three classic works by José de Alencar: Senhora, Lucíola, and Diva. Written by Marcílio Moraes, with the collaboration of Bosco Brasil, Cristianne Fridman and Rosane Lima, under the direction of Fábio Junqueira and João Camargo, general direction by Flávio Colatrello Jr. and core direction by Hiran Silveira.

The production features Christine Fernandes, Carla Cabral, Miriam Freeland, Gabriel Braga Nunes, Adriana Garambone, Paulo Gorgulho, Ana Beatriz Nogueira, and João Vitti in the main roles.

== Background ==
Brazilian writer José de Alencar wrote the three novels on which the soap opera was based: Senhora, Diva, and Lucíola. The novel Senhora had already been adapted four other times: the first by TV Paulista in 1953; twice by the now-defunct TV Tupi, once in 1962 and again in 1971, under the title O Preço de um Homem; and in the telenovela of the same name, shown on Rede Globo in 1975. The decision to adapt them came from the author Marcílio Moraes, uniting them in the same telenovela. Herval Rossano, initially slated to direct the soap opera after the end of A Escrava Isaura, left the network, and Flávio Colatrello Jr. took over the direction.

== Plot ==
In Rio de Janeiro in 1880, Aurélia (Christine Fernandes), Maria da Glória (Carla Cabral), and Mila (Miriam Freeland) are three friends whose lives take them in completely different directions. Aurélia is a poor girl who is orphaned and evicted from her home when her uncle Lemos (Paulo Gorgulho) mercilessly sells the property, as well as losing the great love of her life, journalist Fernando Seixas (Gabriel Braga Nunes), to the arrogant Adelaide (Adriana Garambone), for whom she worked as a maid when the latter offers her a millionaire's dowry that would save his family from bankruptcy. With her father bedridden, Maria da Glória sells her virginity to pay for his medication but is thrown out of the house when the patriarch finds out, deciding to fake her death so as not to embarrass the family and become the greatest courtesan in Rio de Janeiro under the name Lúcia Bicallo. She is venerated by Ferreira (Daniel Boaventura), who liquidates his fortune for her. However, she is romantically involved with the diplomat Paulo (João Vitti), who dreams of getting her out of this life, much to the annoyance of the pimp Cunha (Roberto Bomtempo).

From a traditionalist family, Mila is a girl with abolitionist ideals who falls in love with the black doctor Augusto (Alexandre Moreno) and dreams of becoming a painter, creating paintings that explore sexuality. She lives in conflict with her Machiavellian and conservative mother Leocádia (Ana Beatriz Nogueira), who won't accept her daughter deviating from the standards of high society. Meanwhile, Aurélia receives an unexpected inheritance from her paternal grandfather, who leaves her one of the largest fortunes in Brazil. She returns to Rio de Janeiro a year later to take revenge on Fernando by having him offer her a large dowry to marry a supposed stranger, revealing the whole truth on the day of the wedding and showing him all the bitterness of wasted love.

== Rebroadcasting ==
It was first rebroadcast by Record between October 9 and 31, 2007, replacing the Colombian soap opera Zorro: A Espada e a Rosa, at 5 pm. It was removed from the schedule after 17 chapters, reportedly due to low ratings, and was not concluded. Between October 21, 2007, and March 14, 2008, it was rebroadcast on the Fox Life subscription channel at 7 am with a rebroadcast at 1 pm.

It was a rebroadcast on Rede Família between June 24, 2013, and January 17, 2014, in 150 chapters. It was rebroadcast for the second time on Fox Life. The show was rebroadcast for the second time by the original broadcaster between July 30, 2018, and March 26, 2019, in 167 chapters, replacing Bicho do Mato and was replaced by Caminhos do Coração at 4 pm time slot.

== Cast ==
Actor	Character
Christine Fernandes	Aurélia Lemos Camargo
Carla Cabral	Maria da Glória Assunção / Lúcia
Miriam Freeland	Emília Duarte (Mila)
Gabriel Braga Nunes	Fernando Rodrigues de Seixas
Adriana Garambone	Adelaide Tavares do Amaral
Paulo Gorgulho	Manoel Lemos
Ana Beatriz Nogueira	Leocádia Duarte
João Vitti	Paulo Silva de Macedo
Daniel Boaventura	Guilherme Ferreira Pinto
Alexandre Moreno	Dr. Augusto Pereira
Marcos Winter	Eduardo Abreu
Petrônio Gontijo	Dr. Torquato Ribeiro
Roberto Bomtempo	Mário Cunha
Tânia Alves	Firmina Mascarenhas
Ewerton de Castro	Minister Heródoto Duarte
Ana Rosa	Camila Rodrigues de Seixas
Leonardo Miggiorin	Pedro Lemos Camargo Filho (Pedrinho)
Camila dos Anjos	Ana Assunção (Aninha)
Nathália Rodrigues	Nicota Rodrigues de Seixas
Cássio Reis	Tadeu Chaves Brito
Maria Stella Tobar	Marocas Rodrigues de Seixas (Mariquinha)
Marcos Breda	Alfredo Moreira
Carlo Briani	Police Chief Rodrigo Assunção
Maria da Paixão de Jesus	Damiana
Ingra Liberato	Marli Lemos
Luiz Carlos de Moraes	Artur Tavares do Amaral
Luciene Adami	Ordália
Theodoro Cochrane	Geraldo Duarte
Raquel Nunes	Júlia Duarte (Julinha)
Talita Castro	Bela Lemos
Gésio Amadeu	Sebastião Pereira
Mariana Clara	Nina de Pádua
Maristane Dresch	Laura Marques
Valquíria Ribeiro	Jesuína
Luciano Quirino	Simão dos Anjos
Fernando Oliveira	Martim dos Anjos
Lena Roque	Raimunda dos Anjos
Milhem Cortaz	Lobato
Rômulo Estrela	Romualdo
Luciano Faria	Teodoro
Tércio Gennari	Hermes
Lívia Graciano	Germana
Rodolfo Valente	Mateus Bicallo

=== Special guests ===
Actor	Character
Sílvia Salgado	Emília Lemos Camargo
Celso Frateschi	Pedro Lourenço Camargo
Sérgio Mamberti	Colonel Vigário Lourenço Camargo
Antônio Petrin	Minister Inácio Silva de Macedo
Rejane Arruda	Lúcia Bicallo (real)
Daniel Alvim	Marcos Bicallo
Selma Egrei	Sister Carolina
Stella Freitas	Eunice Camargo
Cida Mendes	Eudóxia Camargo
Daniela Duarte	Princess Isabel of Brazil
Josmar Martins	Dr. Feijó
Tácito Rocha	Haroldo Dias, Baron of Alcobaça
Ariel Moshe	Dr. Bráz
Pascoal da Conceição	Dr. Peçanha
Clemente Viscaíno	Judge
Bruno Giordano	Police Chief Téo

== Soundtrack ==
Esses Mulheres is a soundtrack to the soap opera of the same title, aired by RecordTV. The album was released on June 3, 2005.

Essas Mulheres

Soundtrack album by Various artists
- Released: June 3, 2005
- Genre: MPB
- Length: 40:02
- Label: Record Music

No.	Title	Writer(s)	Character	Length
1.	"Pop Zen"	Nana Caymmi, Dori Caymmi e Danilo Caymmi	Opening	3:43
2.	"Essas Mulheres"	Joanna	Adelaide	3:25
3.	"Uma Chance em Mil"	J. Neto	Aurélia and Fernando	3:31
4.	"Corações Animais"	Zé Ramalho	Lemos	3:16
5.	"Duas em Mim"	Sandra de Sá	Lúcia	3:42
6.	"Motivos Banais"	Raimundo Fagner	Torquato	3:20
7.	"Contigo um Pouquinho"	Alex Cohen	Eduardo	3:47
8.	"É pra Sempre Te Amar"	Guilherme & Santiago	Lúcia and Paulo	3:45
9.	"Vida"	Cláudio Nucci	General	3:45
10.	"Lugar de Cobra é no Chão"	Chico Buarque	Simão	4:31
11.	"Suave é a Noite"	Sylvinha Araújo	Lúcia and Ferreira	4:44
12.	"A Janela da Cidade"	Alexandre Leão	General	4:15
13.	"Agora Sei que Te Amo"	M. Pop	Ana and Pedrinho	4:31
14.	"Valsa Brasileira"	Luiz Melodia	Aurélia	4:44
15.	"Eu Amo"	Alvinho e da Matta	Aurélia and Fernando	4:15
16.	"O Meu Jeito de Agir"	Yasmin	Mila	4:31
17.	"Com Você, Sem Você"	Banda Interativa	Nicota and Tadeu	4:44
18.	"Valsinha"	Cantrix	Arthur and Ordália	4:15
19.	"Oratio"	Corciolli	Mila and Augusto	4:15

== Audience ==
=== Original broadcast ===
The opening chapter had an audience of 10 points and peaks of 13, as it was a 70-minute special, but during the week it dropped to 7 on Friday and 6 on Saturday. On May 23, the soap reached its highest rating with a peak of 17 points in the chapter showing Maria da Glória's transformation into Lúcia when she received her first client as a courtesan. The last chapter, on October 21, scored 12 audience points with peaks of 14 and a 21% share. Essas Mulheres had an overall average of 8.73 points. The numbers were reported by the broadcaster as lower compared with the numbers of its predecessor, as well as reports of lower press coverage to Essas Mulheres compared to two of the broadcaster's biggest hits: A Escrava Isaura and Prova de Amor.

=== Second rebroadcast ===
In its second rerun, the soap opera premiered with 5.7 points, placing third in Greater São Paulo. However, in some of its chapters, the soap opera maintained similar ratings, occasionally trailing Band and TV Cultura in its first few months. It set a record on August 6, 2018, with 7.3 points, which coincided with the airing of the last chapter of Luz do Sol. It recorded its lowest rating on December 25, registering 3 points. However, as specific scenes aired, the soap opera's ratings increased and approached the ratings of Fofocalizando and Casos de Família, both from SBT. On October 31, it was runner-up with 6 points and peaks of 7 in São Paulo. On January 4, 2019, the soap again had higher audience numbers than the competitor's gossip show, registering 5 points with peaks of 6, a trend not observed during its first rerun. On March 21, 2019, it registered its highest audience: 8.5 points and secured the runner-up position. The last chapter had an average of 7 points and achieved the runner-up position. It closed with an overall average of 5.3 points, aligned with the average ratings for the 4 pm slot.

== See also ==
- A Escrava Isaura (2004 TV series)
