= 3rd Golden Eagle Awards =

Chinese TV awards ceremony in 1985

The 3rd Golden Eagle Awards were held April 3, 1985, in Hangzhou, Zhejiang province. Nominees and winners are listed below, winners are in bold.

== Best Television Series ==
not awarded this year

- Huo Yuanjia/霍元甲
- Harbin Under The Curtain/夜幕下的哈尔滨
- Blizzard Tonight/今夜有暴风雪

== Best Mini-series ==
not awarded this year

- Captain and His Wife/远洋船长和他的妻子
- Blue House/蓝屋
- Chen Yi and Assassin/陈毅与刺客
- Hua Sheng A Gou/花生阿狗

== Best Lead Actor in a Television Series ==
- **Ren Zhiyu for Xu Beihong**

== Best Lead Actress in a Television Series ==
- **Ren Meng for Blizzard Tonight**

== Best Supporting Actor in a Television Series ==
- **Lv Yi for Blizzard Tonight**

== Best Supporting Actress in a Television Series ==
- **Hong Xuemin for Soldier**

== Best Dubbing Actor ==
- **Jian Zhaoqiang for The Blood Doubts**

== Best Dubbing Actress ==
- **Yao Xijuan for The Blood Doubts**

== Best Foreign Actor ==
- **Yamazaki Tsutomu for The Blood Doubts**

== Best Foreign Actress ==
- **Lucélia Santos for Escrava Isaura**
