= A Sucessora (TV series) =

- Based on: A Sucessora by Carolina Nabuco
- Written by: Manoel Carlos
- Directed by: Herval Rossano, Gracindo Júnior and Sérgio Mattar
- Starring: Susana Vieira; Rubens de Falco; Nathalia Timberg
- Opening theme: "Odeon" (Nara Leão)
- Country of origin: Brazil
- Original language: Portuguese
- No. of episodes: 125

Production
- Running time: c. 45 minutes

Original release
- Network: Rede Globo
- Release: 9 October 1978 – 2 March 1979

A Sucessora is a Brazilian telenovela written by Manoel Carlos based on the homonym novel written by Carolina Nabuco in 1934. It was aired from 9 October 1978 to 2 March 1979, comprised 125 episodes and starred Suzana Vieira, Rubens de Falco, and Nathalia Timberg.

== Synopsis ==
The story follows the experiences of protagonist Marina, a young country bumpkin who marries the mysterious and charismatic widower Roberto Stein, a fabulously wealthy businessman living in 1920s Rio de Janeiro. As Marina attempts to acclimate to her new marriage and responsibilities, she discovers that Stein's late wife, Alice, still seems to have a strong hold over the household. Despite her new husband's affection for her, Marina is nonetheless threatened by Alice's presence, which is made conspicuous through her old maid Juliana's obsessions and her intimidating portrait.

== Cast ==
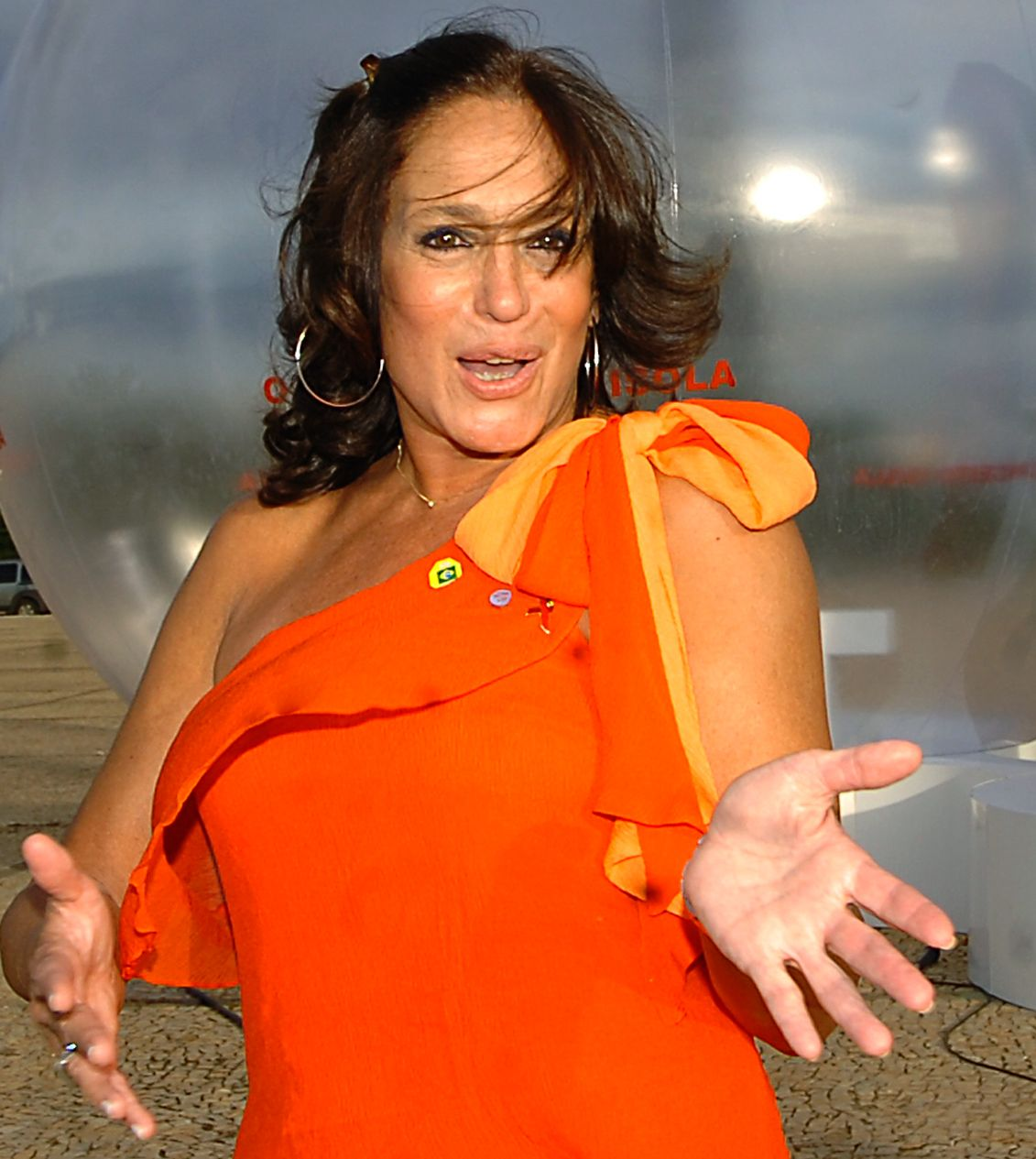
Suzana Vieira

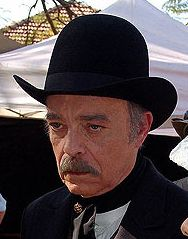
Rubens de Falco

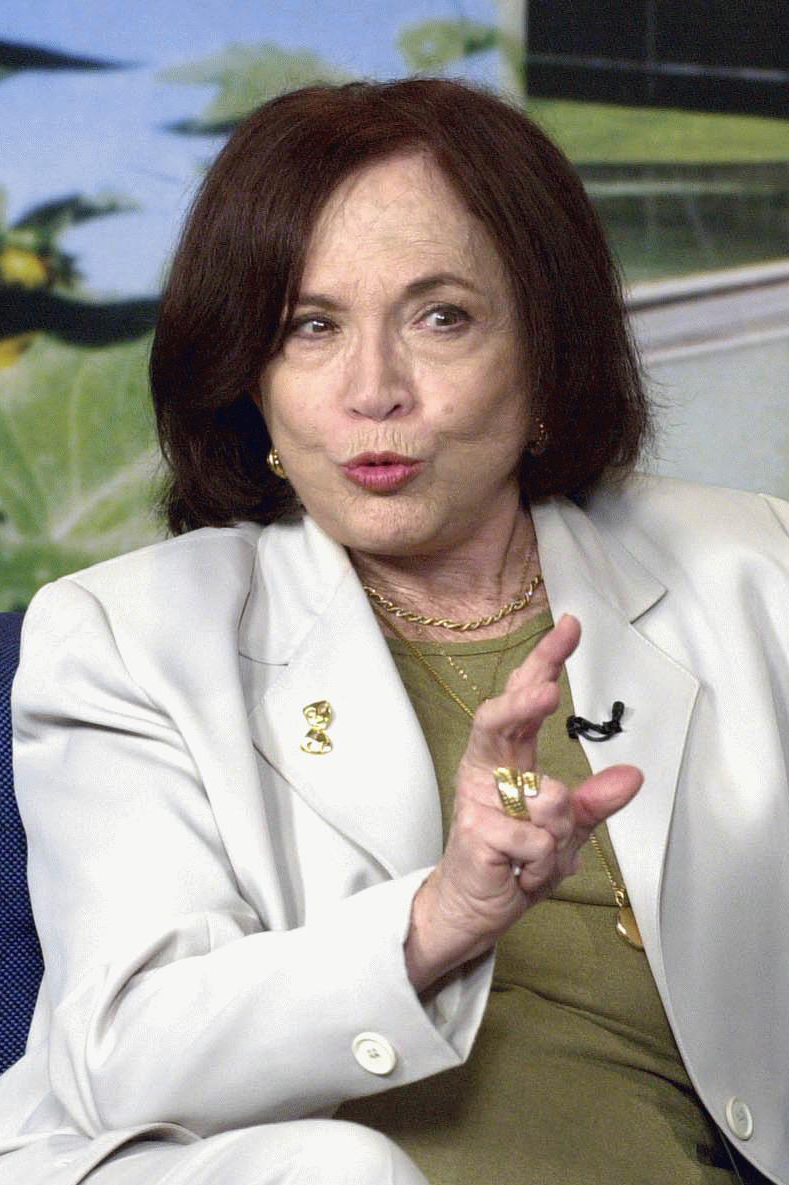
Nathalia Timberg

| Actor/Actress | Character |
|---|---|
| Susana Vieira | Marina Stein |
| Rubens de Falco | Roberto Stein |
| Nathalia Timberg | Juliana |
| Arlete Salles | Germana |
| Liza Vieira | Adélia |
| Mário Cardoso | Pedro Monte |
| Célia Biar | Filomena |
| Beatriz Veiga | Emília |
| Heloísa Helena | Madame Sanches |
| Ary Coslov | Munhoz |
| Patrícia Bueno | Laurita |
| Sônia de Paula | Isabel |
| Kadu Moliterno | Vasco |
| Carmen Monegal | Vanice |
| Ankito | Edmundo Macedo |
| Jorge Cherques | Mr. Lopes |
| Munira Haddad | Ondina |
| Paulo Pinheiro | Antônio |
| Sidney Marques | Tião |
| Cahuê Filho | Father Manfredo |
| Rosana Penha | Lúcia de Góes |
| Dartagnan Mello | José |
| Jotta Barroso | Benedito |
| Reginaldo Daniel | Edu |
| Patrícia Parker | Branca |
| Luís Vasconcelos | Pedro |
| Tetê Pritzl | Luísa |
| Miriam Pires | Guilhermina |
| Francisco Dantas | Dr. Moretti |
| Marcos Toledo | Arthur Neves |
| Pietro Mário | Padre Eládio |
| Apolo Correia | Carlos |
| Alessandra Vieira | Alice Stein |
| Telma Lima | Leonor |
| Joana Rocha | Ana |
| Alcebíades Bandeira | Júlio |
| Celi Peterson | Aparecida |
| Lony Nunes | Olívia |
| Gracindo Júnior | Epaminondas |
| Paulo Figueiredo | Miguel |

== Soundtrack ==
- "Ontem ao Luar" - Fafá de Belém
- "Santa Maria" - Hermes Aquino
- "Odeon" - Nara Leão
- "Mal-me-quer" - Maria Creusa
- "Como Se Fosse" - Lucinha Araújo
- "Gadu Namorando" - Os Carioquinhas
