= Rubens de Falco =

Brazilian actor (1931–2008)

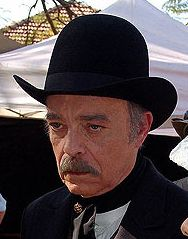
- Falco in 2004
- Born: Rubens de Falco da Costa; October 19, 1931; São Paulo, Brazil
- Died: February 22, 2008 (aged 76); São Paulo, Brazil
- Occupation: Actor
- Years active: 1952–2008

Rubens de Falco da Costa (October 19, 1931 – February 22, 2008) was a Brazilian actor best known for his work in telenovelas, specifically his portrayal as a slave owner in the 1976 telenovela Escrava Isaura (The Slave Isaura) and the 1986 telenovela Sinhá Moça (Little Missy).

== Career ==
De Falco was born in São Paulo, Brazil on October 19, 1931. He began his acting career in the local theater. In 1955, he joined the group "Os Jograis", of São Paulo, and performed beside such actors as Ruy Afonso, Italo Rossi and Felipe Wagner. He made his cinema debut in 1952 in the film Apassionata, for the Companhia Cinematográfica Vera Cruz.

In television, he had prominent parts in telenovelas such as O Rei dos Ciganos (1967), A Rainha Louca (1967), O Passo dos Ventos (1968), Gabriela (1975), O Grito (1975), Escrava Isaura (1976), Dona Xepa (1977), A Sucessora (1978) and Sinhá Moça (1986).

Perhaps his best-known work came in 1976, when he portrayed the cruel villain Leôncio Almeida, a powerful farm owner and ruthless slave owner in the telenovela Escrava Isaura. De Falco's character, Leôncio Almeida, falls in love with one of his slaves, played by Brazilian actress Lucélia Santos.

Escrava Isaura was extremely well received globally and became a hit in Africa, Eastern Europe and Latin America. Escrava Isaura was the first soap opera ever broadcast in Poland and the Soviet Union and became the first television series to air in China with foreign actors in the lead role. Rubens de Falco, who played Leôncio Almeida as one of his trademark villains, was called "the great villain of Brazilian television drama" by Lucélia Santos.

He again portrayed a powerful farm owner and ruthless slave owner, the cruel villain Baron de Araruna, in the 1986 telenovela Sinhá Moça alongside Lucélia Santos who starred this time as his rebellious daughter.

De Falco's last television role was as Almeida in 2004 in the Rede Record remake of A Escrava Isaura, and his last film role was as Deputado Ernesto Alves in 2008 in Fim da Linha.

== Death ==
Rubens de Falco died on February 22, 2008, of heart failure at the CIAI Center for the Aged in São Paulo, Brazil. He was not married and left no descendants.

== Filmography ==
=== On television ===
Year	Title	Role	Broadcaster
1961	Maria Antonieta		TV Cultura
1966	O Rei dos Ciganos	Claude Ludenwerg	Rede Globo
1967	A Rainha Louca	Emperor Maximiliano	Rede Globo
1968	Demian, o Justiceiro	Anderson	Rede Globo
1968	Passo dos Ventos	René Antoine	Rede Globo
1969	A Última Valsa	Emperor Francisco José	Rede Globo
1973	Tempo de Viver	Maurício	Rede Tupi
1974	Supermanoela	Diógenes	Rede Globo
1975	Gabriela	Pimentel	Rede Globo
1975	Escalada	Commander	Rede Globo
1975	O Grito	Agenor	Rede Globo
1976	Escrava Isaura	Leôncio Almeida	Rede Globo
1977	Dona Xepa	Heitor Camargo	Rede Globo
1977	O Astro	Samir Hayala	Rede Globo
1978	A Sucessora	Roberto Steen	Rede Globo
1979	Gaivotas	Daniel	Rede Tupi
1979	Os Maias		RTP
1980	Cabaret Literário		TV Cultura
1980	Drácula, uma História de Amor	Drácula	Rede Tupi
1980	Um Homem Muito Especial	Conde Vladimir "Drácula"	Rede Bandeirantes
1981	Os Imigrantes	Antonio di Salvio	Rede Bandeirantes
1982	Campeão	Jorge Salém	Rede Bandeirantes
1982	La Bruja	Venacio Do Santos	Venevision
1983	Maçã do Amor	Daniel e Paulo Cardoso	Rede Bandeirantes
1984	Padre Cícero	Floro Bartolomeu	Rede Globo
1984	Viver a Vida	Rodolfo	Rede Manchete
1985	Grande Sertão Veredas	Joca Ramiro	Rede Globo
1986	Sinhá Moça	Colonel Ferreira "Barão de Araruna"	Rede Globo
1987	Bambolê	Nestor Barreto	Rede Globo
1989	Pacto de Sangue	Abílio Mendonça	Rede Globo
1990	Brasileiras e Brasileiros	Ramiro	SBT
1991	Salomé	McGregor	Rede Globo
1994	Memorial de Maria Moura	Colonel Tibúrcio do Garrote	Rede Globo
1994	Confissões de Adolescente	Dr. Rogério (Episode: "Essa Tal de Virgindade")	TV Cultura
1995	Sangue do Meu Sangue	Mário Albuquerque Soares	SBT
1997	Os Ossos do Barão	Cândido Caldas Penteado	SBT
1998	Brida	Vargas	Rede Manchete
2004	A Escrava Isaura	Leopoldo Almeida	Record TV

=== On film ===
Year	Title	Role
2008	Fim da Linha	Deputy Ernesto Alves (posthumous release)
2001	Sonhos Tropicais	General Travassos
1996	O Monge e a Filha do Carrasco	Master Salineiro
1985	Un hombre de éxito	Iriarte
1985	Na Hora Texaco	Julio
1984	Macho y hembra	Vicente
1981	Pixote, a Lei do Mais Fraco	Judge
1980	A Dama de Branco	Maurício
1979	Os Foragidos da Violência	Pedreira
1978	Colonel Delmiro Gouveia	Colonel Delmiro Gouveia
1977	Este Rio Muito Louco	—N/a
1976	O Homem da Cabeça de Ouro	Daniel
1976	Deixa Amorzinho... deixa	—N/a
1975	O Sósia da Morte	Narciso
1975	Nós, Os Canalhas	Herculano "Tatá"
1974	O Mau Caráter	Moreira Silva
1973	Café na Cama	Flávio
1972	Missão Matar	John Dorcas
1972	A Difícil Vida Fácil	Ricardo
1971	Uma Pantera em Minha Cama	Renato Lira
1970	Anjos e Demônios	Lawyer on Tribunal
1969	Tempo de Violência	"F"
1969	O Impossível Acontece	—N/a
1968	O Homem que Comprou o Mundo	Emperor Maximiliano
1966	Engraçadinha — Depois dos Trinta	—N/a
1966	Essa Gatinha É Minha	—N/a
1958	O Pão Que o Diabo Amassou	—N/a
1957	O Capanga	—N/a
1954	Floradas na Serra	Moacir
1953	Esquina da Ilusão	Rubens
1952	Apassionata	—N/a

=== Narration ===
Year	Title	Notes
1959	Moral em Concordata	documentary
