= Neschling =

Neschling is a surname. Notable people with the surname include:

- John Neschling (born 1947), Brazilian conductor
- Pedro Neschling (born 1982), Brazilian actor
