= Brasileiras e Brasileiros =

- Created by: SBT
- Country of origin: Brazil
- Original language: Portuguese

Original release
- Network: SBT
- Release: November 5, 1990 – May 14, 1991

Brasileiros e Brasileiras is a Brazilian telenovela that was in some schedules for SBT between November 5, 1990, and May 14, 1991. The show was written and directed by Walter Avancini. The show was a co-production of the Miksom.

== Plot ==
In the São Paulo suburbs, Ângelo is thinking about coming back to practice wrestling. Later on, he and Totó decide to promote a women's wrestling gym called Duras Na Queda (Hard on the Fall). They then participate at Tereza de Ogum. Alma and Arlete are always surrounded by the Limovi (Liga pela Moral e Virtude-League for the Moral and the Virtue), which is led by Coriolano.

== Cast ==
- Edson Celulari as Totó
- Fúlvio Stefanini as Ângelo
- Carla Camurati as Catarina
- Lucélia Santos as Paula
- Rubens de Falco as Ramiro Borges
- Ney Latorraca as Brás Cubas
- Daniel Dantas as Orlando
- Rosi Campos as Clarisse
- Walderez de Barros as Cândida
- Ana Lúcia Torre as Clara
- Marcelo Serrado as Boca
- Antônio Calloni as Plinio
- Isadora Ribeiro as Tereza de Ogum
- Mário Cardoso as Bruno
- Zezeh Barbosa as Edilaine
- Alexandra Marzo as Alma
- Andréa Avancini as de Lourdes
- Consuelo Leandro as Tia Ju
- Jacqueline Laurence as Antoinette
- Arlete Montenegro as Suzana
- Adilson Branches as Pernambucano
- Josmar Martins as Vasco
- Paulo Autran as Special participation
- Irene Ravache as Special participation
- Juca de Oliveira as Special participation
- Fábio Júnior as Special participation
- Laerte Morrone as Coriolano
