= A Escrava Isaura (2004 TV series) =

- Title card
- Also known as: La Esclava Isaura o Isaura, La Esclava
- Genre: Drama, romance, telenovela
- Created by: Bernardo Guimarães
- Developed by: Thiago Santiago
- Starring: Bianca Rinaldi; Leopoldo Pacheco; Théo Becker
- Country of origin: Brazil
- Original language: Portuguese
- No. of seasons: 1
- No. of episodes: 167

Production
- Producer: Henrique Daniel
- Production locations: Campos dos Goytacazes, Rio de Janeiro
- Camera setup: Multi-camera
- Running time: 60 min

Original release
- Network: Rede Record
- Release: October 18, 2004 – April 29, 2005

Related
- Escrava Isaura (1976 TV series); Escrava Mãe

A Escrava Isaura (The Slave Isaura) is a 2004 Brazilian telenovela based on A Escrava Isaura, an 1875 abolitionist romance novel by Bernardo Guimarães. The series tells the story of a coffee-plantation owner's passion for one of his slaves. Herval Rossano directed both this and the 1976 version.

Rede Record, run by televangelist Edir Macedo, produced this expanded remake of a serial that aired in 1976 on Rede Globo. The series drew high ratings among Brazilian viewers and was expanded from 100 to 167 episodes. It aired in Europe and the Middle East on Zone Romantica.

== Story ==
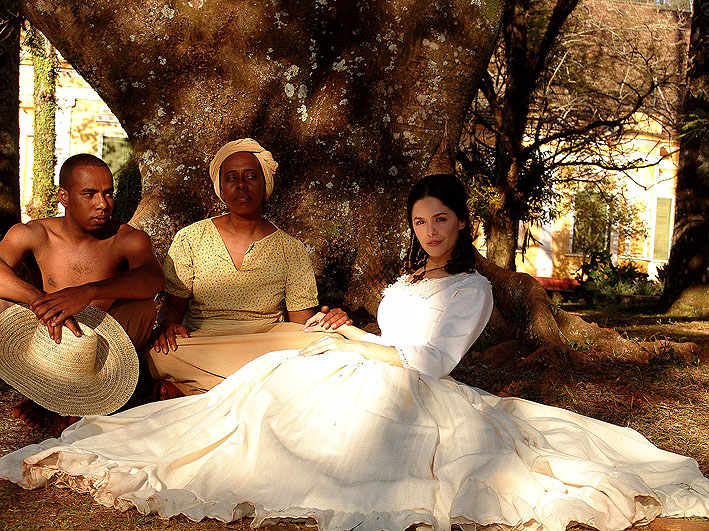
Bianca Rinaldi in costume as the main character Isaura

This melodrama focuses on the conflict between the beautiful light-skinned slave woman Isaura (Bianca Rinaldi, originally, Lucélia Santos) and her cruel, lecherous master Leôncio (Leopold Pacheco, originally Rubens de Falco) in 1855 Brazil. The heroine is the 20-year-old daughter of a white father and a mulatto mother. She was born and raised on the coffee plantation of Commander Almeida (Rubens de Falco) in the village of Goitacaces. When Juliana, Isaura's mother (Valquiria Ribeiro), dies shortly after giving birth, Gertrudes (Norma Blum), the commander's wife, treats the child as her own daughter, giving her an education and fine manners.

Isaura is devoutly religious; she prays often, avoids the witchcraft practiced by some other slaves and often wears a prominent cross around her neck. Her father, a free laborer, repeatedly begs for her freedom and makes offer after offer to buy her from the commander. Despite promises to set her free one day, every offer is rejected. Isaura remains a slave because she is a slave's daughter—and freedom always seems to be just beyond her reach. When commander realizes his fault, it is too late.

In 1854, when Isaura is a young adult, the commander’s son Leôncio returns to the fazenda after piling up enormous debts. He soon marries Malvina (Maria Ribeiro), daughter of Colonel Sebastiao (Paulo Figueiredo). Nevertheless, he develops a dangerous fixation with Isaura and determines to make her his mistress.

The commander and Gertrudes protect Isaura from Leôncio for a while, but they become ill and pass away before setting her free. The sweet young woman winds up at the mercy of an obsessed, depraved man, fighting to maintain her dignity and integrity. As Isaura desperately struggles to keep her dreams alive, she discovers true love for the first time.

== Cast ==
- Bianca Rinaldi as Isaura dos Anjos, the slave girl
- Leopoldo Pacheco as Leôncio Almeida, Commander Almeida's evil son, obsessed with Isaura
- Maria Ribeiro as Malvina, Leôncio's jealous wife
- Jackson Antunes as Miguel, Isaura's father
- Rubens de Falco as Almeida, the commander
- Norma Blum as Gertrudes, the commander's wife
- Theo Becker as Álvaro Medonça (Mendoza), the suitor
- Paulo Figueiredo as Col. Sebastião Cunha, Malvina's father
- Valquiria Ribeiro as Juliana, Isaura's mother
- Mayara Magri as Countess Tomásia de Melo Albuquerque de Sousa Javier, Leôncio's major enemy
- Patrícia França as Rosa, illegitimate daughter of Col. Sebastião (later becomes his slave), Leôncio's slave that is jealous of Isaura
- Déo Garcez as André, Leôncio's slave, in love with Isaura
- Míriam Mehler as Gioconda, Tomásia's mother
- Ewerton de Castro as Belchior, humped ugly gardener in Leôncio's house, in love with Isaura
- Jonas Mello as Francisco [or Seu (Señor) Chico], Leoncio's foreman
- Fernanda Nobre as Helena, Malvina's sister
- Lugui Palhares as Diogo, Tomásia's cousin
- André Fusko as Gabriel, Tomásia's brother
- Gabriel Gracindo as Henrique, Malvina's brother
- Paula Lobo Antunes as Aurora, Sebastião's second cousin
- Silvia Bandeira as Perpétua, Álvaro's mother
- Renata Dominguez as Branca, Geraldo's sister in love with Álvaro; she later becomes crazy
- Aldine Müller as Estela, Perpétua's friend
- Ivan De Almeida as João, André's father
- Chica Lopes as Joaquina, André's aunt
- Christovam Neto as Bernardo, Tomasia's freed slave
- Bárbara Garcia as Lipanesa [or Moleca], Bernardo's love
- Fábio Junqueira as Dr. Paulo Pereira, Helena's arranged husband
- Caio Junqueira as Geraldo Villela, Estela's son, Álvaro's friend
- Cláudio Curi as Cap. Martinho, Slave hunter
- Rômulo Delduque as Raimundo, Leôncio's foreman
- Rodrigo Zanardi as Aloíso Guimarães, sergeant
- Maria Cláudia as Serafina, owner of a bar and prostitute
- Lígia Fagundes as Flor-de-Lís, prostitute
- Thaís Lima as Margarida, prostitute
- Daniela Duarte as Violeta, prostitute

Cast notes

- Rubens de Falco, who played Commander Almeida, played Leôncio (the role played here by Leopoldo Pacheco) in the original 1976 version of this novela. Likewise, Norma Blum, who played Getrudes, played Malvina (played here by Maria Ribeiro) in the original 1976 version.

== International broadcast ==
Spanish title card

Telemundo started airing the series dubbed into Spanish as La Esclava Isaura in the US on May 7, 2007. It temporarily aired for two hours per night from 9 to 11 p.m. (ET/PT) from July 24 until August 3, 2007. The finale aired December 3, 2007.

In June, 2007, Isaura's time slot (which included one soccer preemption) averaged 680,000 core adult viewers (ages 18 to 49). That was a 16 percent increase over the year before, when Decisiones aired during that hour, according to Nielsen Media Research. During November, the show averaged 587,000 core viewers.
