= Carolina Nabuco =

Brazilian writer (1890–1981)

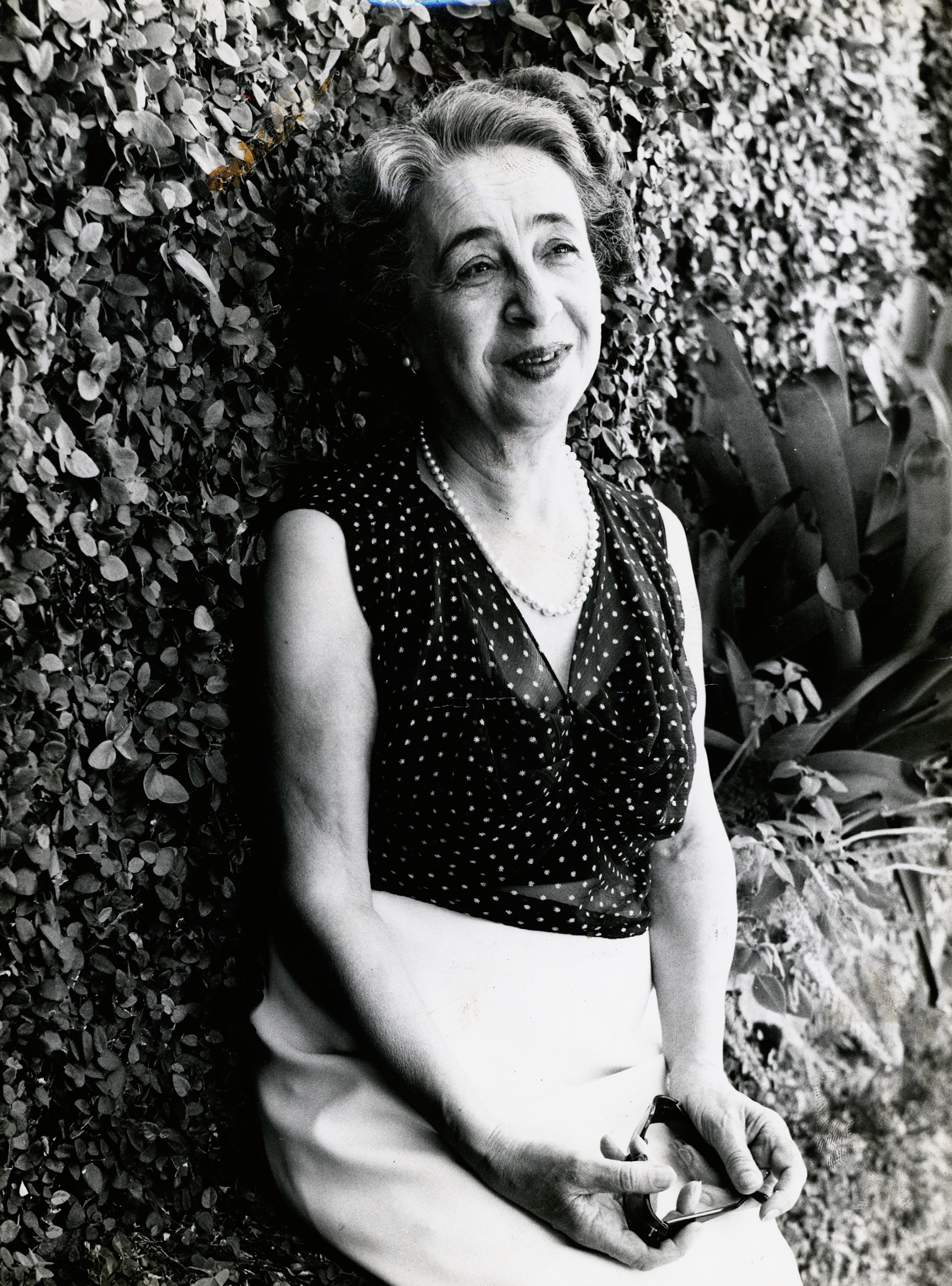
- Carolina Nabuco, in 1959
- Born: Maria Carolina Nabuco de Araújo; February 9, 1890; Rio de Janeiro
- Died: August 18, 1981 (aged 91); Rio de Janeiro
- Occupations: Writer, translator

Carolina Nabuco (February 9, 1890 – August 18, 1981), born Maria Carolina Nabuco de Araújo, was a Brazilian writer and translator.

In 1978, Carolina received the Machado de Assis Award, from the Brazilian Academy of Letters, for her body of work.

== Life ==
Carolina was born in the city of Rio de Janeiro, in 1890. She was the daughter of Evelina Torres Ribeiro Nabuco and Joaquim Nabuco, writer, diplomat and general deputy of the Empire of Brazil, co-founder of the Brazilian Academy of Letters She spent her childhood in Petrópolis, and her adolescence in the United States, where her father was an ambassador for Brazil.

In 1928, she published her first book, the biography of her father, Joaquim Nabuco, awarded with the Essay Prize of the Brazilian Academy of Letters. She worked as a translator and writer.

== A Sucessora and Rebecca ==
In 1934 she published the novel A Sucessora. The novel was involved in a controversy scandal, after the release of Daphne du Maurier's novel Rebecca, dealing with the latter's supposed plagiarism of Nabuco's book. Nabuco was accused of plagiarizing the novel Encarnação by Brazilian author José de Alencar, when she wrote A Sucessora.

Following the release of the film version of Rebecca, the New York Times Book Review published an article highlighting the similarities between the two novels. prompting an immediate rebuttal from du Maurier in a letter to the editor.

No one suggests that du Maurier could read Brazilian Portuguese, so the case that she was influenced by Nabuco's novel rests on her having access to the Brazilian author's manuscript translations of A Sucessora into English and French, which Nabuco and her champions say she submitted to publishers in the United States, the United Kingdom, and France, although neither was ever published. Different sources speculate that du Maurier was given access to both the English and French translations in identical but unconnected circumstances. No evidence has been produced to support this.

Though there were repercussions in Brazil, Nabuco did not consider suing the English publishers. Nabuco says that when the Alfred Hitchcock film Rebecca was released in Brazil, United Artists' lawyers approached her to sign a term (with financial compensation) agreeing that there had been "coincidence", but Nabuco refused.

This information, declared by Carolina herself in her memoirs, corrects a mistake by the writer Nelly Novaes Coelho, who states, in her Dicionário Crítico de Escritoras Brasileiras (1711–2001), that Carolina would have sued the English writer for plagiarism.

A Sucessora was adapted as a telenovela, in 1978, written by Manoel Carlos and aired on TV Globo.

== Death ==
Carolina died on August 18, 1981, in the city of Rio de Janeiro, at 91, due to a cardiac arrest.

== Works ==
- A Vida de Joaquim Nabuco (1929, biography)
- A Sucessora (1934, novel)
- Chama e Cinzas (1947, novel)
- Meu Livro de Cozinha (1977, cookbook)
- O Ladrão de Guarda-Chuva e Dez Outras Histórias (short stories)
- Oito décadas (memoirs)
- Santa Catarina de Siena (biography)
- Virgílio de Melo Franco (biography)
- Retrato dos Estados Unidos à luz da sua literatura (essay)
