= Timor Lorosae: The Unseen Massacre =

2001 film by Lucélia Santos

- Directed by: Lucélia Santos
- Written by: Pedro Neschling; Lucélia Santos
- Starring: Lucélia Santos
- Release date: 28 October 2001 (Brazil)
- Running time: 80 minutes
- Country: Brazil
- Language: Portuguese

Timor Lorosae: The Unseen Massacre (Portuguese: Timor Lorosae - O Massacre Que o Mundo não Viu) is a 2001 Brazilian documentary film directed by actress and director Lucélia Santos. The film shows the situation in East Timor, a year after the ballot that decided its independence.

== Awards and nominations ==
The film won the Audience Award at the 2002 Recife Cinema Festival.
