= O Rei dos Ciganos =

- Genre: Telenovela
- Created by: Moysés Weltman
- Directed by: Ziembinski
- Starring: Carlos Alberto; Sônia Clara; André Villon
- Country of origin: Brazil
- Original language: Portuguese
- No. of episodes: 120

Original release
- Network: TV Globo
- Release: 12 September 1966 – 20 February 1967

Related
- O Ébrio; A Sombra de Rebecca

O Rei dos Ciganos is a Brazilian telenovela produced and broadcast by TV Globo. It premiered on 12 September 1966 and ended on 20 February 1967. It is the second "novela das oito" to be aired on the timeslot.

== Cast ==
Actor	Character
Carlos Alberto	Wladimir
Sônia Clara	Wanda
André Villon	Conde Fernando Racozy
Jaime Barcellos	Miguel
Theresa Amayo	Svetlana
Rubens de Falco	Claude Ludenwerg
Rosita Thomaz Lopes	Yara Racozy
Ziembinski	Steiner
Glauce Rocha	Gerdora
José de Arimathéa	Ivan
Renata Fronzi	Tânia
Riva Blanche Baronesa	Von Grauben
