= Norma Blum =

Brazilian actress (born 1939)

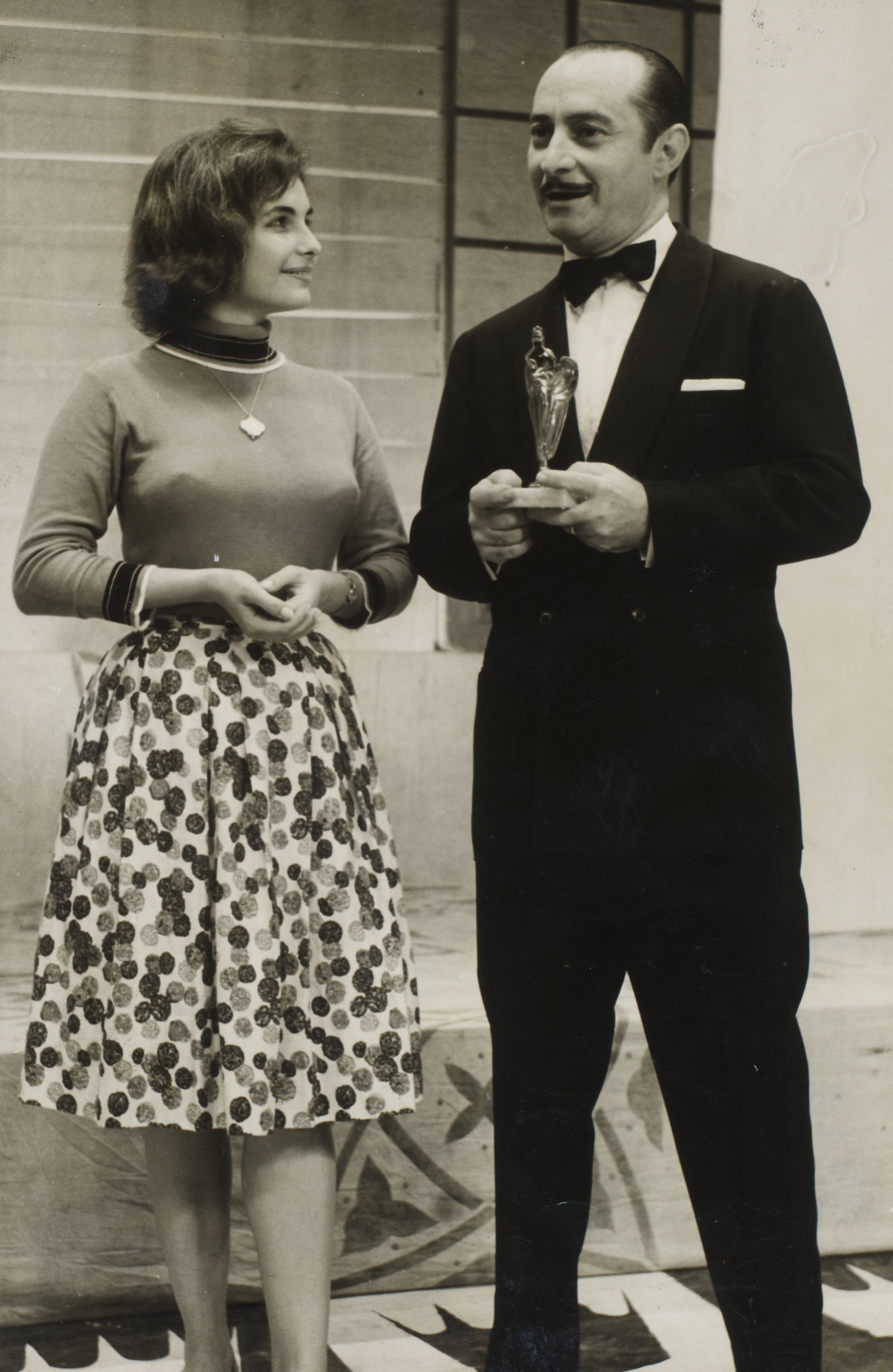
- Norma Blum with Carlos Galhardo in 1960
- Born: Norma de Lacerda Blum; 11 October 1939 (age 86); Rio de Janeiro, Brazil
- Occupations: Television, film and theatre actress
- Notable work: Muitas Vidas: Vida e Carreira de Norma Blum (autobiography)

Norma de Lacerda Blum (born 11 October 1939) is a television, theatre and film actress and television presenter. She also works as a motivational therapist, having published several books.

== Early life ==
Blum was born in Rio de Janeiro on 11 October 1939. She first worked in 1951, at the age of twelve, on the now defunct TV Tupi as script assistant to her father, who was responsible for translating texts to be transformed into television programmes. In 1954, she joined the permanent staff of TV Tupi actors, participating in several programmes, such as Teatro de Comédia, led by Maurício Sherman, Grande Teatro Tupi, directed by Sérgio Britto and Fernando Torres, and Teatrinho Troll, by Fábio Sabag. She was also in the cast of soap operas, such as A Canção de Bernadete (Bernadette's song), in the role of Our Lady of Lourdes. In addition to TV Tupi, Blum worked for TV Excelsior, TV Rio and TV Continental. In 1957, she participated in the New York Herald Tribune World Youth Forum and took part in a television show on the public broadcaster, WNET, in which she revealed that she spoke eight languages.

== TV Globo ==
In 1964 Blum was invited to join the new TV Globo network. In her first job, she participated in the program Romance na Tarde, where she presented films and conducted interviews with actors and singers. She also participated in shows featuring Dercy Gonçalves and soap operas, such as A Gata de Mink in 1968. Along with Hilton Gomes, she led the presentation of Brazil's Festival Internacional da Canção (International Song Festival) in 1968 and in 1969. In 1975 she returned to TV Globo and starred in the soap opera, Senhora, written by Gilberto Braga and directed by Herval Rossano. She was subsequently in the cast of many TV Globo soap operas such as Bravo!, in 1975; Elas por Elas, in 1982; Sinhá Moça (Little Missy), in 1986; and Lua Cheia de Amor (Moon full of love) in 1990. Her most famous soap opera roles were as Malvina, in Escrava Isaura, in 1976, and as Herta in Ciranda de Pedra, in 1981.

== Resumption of career ==
In 1992, Blum decided to retire for health reasons. However, she resumed her career in 2003 in Pícara Sonhadora (The Mischievous Dreamer), an SBT production. In 2004 she appeared in a remake of Escrava Isaura. In 2011, she joined the cast of the soap opera by Gilberto Braga, Insensato Coração (Irrational Heart), on TV Globo. In addition to her television work, Blum appeared in 17 plays, between 1959 and 2003 and 17 films between 1956 and 2017. In 2020 she was working on a film about four 80-year-old women who had been schoolmates, when filming was interrupted by COVID-19.

== Work as a therapist ==
Blum has worked in the area of self-transformation for several decades, giving motivational talks and participating in workshops. Her first publication on the topic was a self-help guide using Neuro-linguistic programming (NLP) techniques. This was followed by two pocketbooks designed to be used on a daily basis, and three stories for children.

== Autobiography ==
In 2010, Blum published an autobiography, entitled Muitas Vidas: Vida e Carreira de Norma Blum (Many lives: Life and Career of Norma Blum).

== Filmography ==
=== Television ===
Year	Title	Role	Notes	Broadcaster
1955	Nossa Cidade	Emily		TV Rio
1955-60	Bailes de Carnaval	Presenter		TV Rio
1956-59	Noite de Gala	Presenter		TV Rio
1957	A Canção de Bernadette	Our Lady of Lourdes		TV Rio
1957	A Pequena Sereia	Little Mermaid		TV Rio
1958	Grande Teatro Tupi	Various characters	1958–1962	Rede Tupi
1958	Turandot	Su-hir		Rede Tupi
1958	A Bruxinha que Era Boa	Good Little Witch		Rede Tupi
1958	O Preço do Erro			Rede Tupi
1959	O Príncipe Pássaro	Olga girl		Rede Tupi
1960	O Colar das Vontades	Queen		Rede Tupi
1960	O Barba Azul	Helena		Rede Tupi
1961	O Pintor e a Florista	Florist		Rede Tupi
1961	O Dono da Bola	Eva		Rede Tupi
1962	Os Três Cisnes	Princess Sirene		Rede Tupi
1962	O Príncipe e o Mendigo	Princess		Rede Tupi
1962	O Sino da Capela	Girl		Rede Tupi
1962	Dona Felicidade	Felicidade		Rede Tupi
1962	A Esposa de Marco Pólo	Marco Pólo's wife		Rede Tupi
1963	A Bela e a Fera	Belle		Rede Tupi
1963	O Lago dos Cisnes	Princess Odete		Rede Tupi
1963	A Escrava da Judeia	Princess Neferere		Rede Tupi
1964	O Acusador			Rede Tupi
1965	Romance na Tarde	Presenter		Rede Tupi
1965	Ilusões Perdidas	Dora		TV Globo
1966	Os Irmãos Corsos	Isabella		Rede Tupi
1967	O Homem Proibido	Pamela Abbott		TV Globo
1967–68	Dercy de Verdade	Various characters		TV Globo
1968	Festival Internacional da Canção	Presenter		TV Globo
1968	A Gata de Vison	Helen Brown		TV Globo
1969	A Última Valsa	Clara de Olemberg		TV Globo
1969	Festival Internacional da Canção	Presenter		TV Globo
1975	Pluft, o Fantasminha	Maribel		TV Globo
1975	Senhora	Aurélia Camargo		TV Globo
1975	Bravo!	Elvira	Special appearance	TV Globo
1976	Vejo a Lua no Céu	Suzana		TV Globo
1976	Escrava Isaura	Malvina Fontoura		TV Globo
1980	Marina	Sônia		TV Globo
1981	Ciranda de Pedra	Frau Herta		TV Globo
1982	Caso Verdade	Nadir	Episode: "O Menino do Olho Azul"	TV Globo
1982	Caso Verdade		Episode: "Um Peixe Fora D'água"	TV Globo
1982	Elas por Elas	Marieta Ferreira		TV Globo
1982	Caso Verdade	Ivone	Episode: "A Caçadora de Vampiros"	TV Globo
1983	Maçã do Amor	Countess Lílian		Rede Bandeirantes
1984	Caso Verdade	Helena	Episode: "Renúncia"	TV Globo
1984	Caso Verdade		Episode: "Blumenau, Tudo Azul"	TV Globo
1984	Caso Verdade	Janete	Episode: "Não Roubarás"	TV Globo
1985	Caso Verdade		Episode: "Os Gêmeos"	TV Globo
1985	Caso Verdade	Célia	Episode: "Vivendo e Aprendendo"	TV Globo
1986	Sinhá Moça	Nina Teixeira		TV Globo
1987	Bambolê	Carmem		TV Globo
1989	O Cometa	Teresa Ribeiro		Rede Bandeirantes
1989	Cortina de Vidro	Clarisse		SBT
1990	Lua Cheia de Amor	Maria Cecília		TV Globo
1992	Anos Rebeldes	Valquíria Galvão		TV Globo
1992	Você Decide	Lisa	Episode: "Na Marca do Pênalti"	TV Globo
2001	Pícara Sonhadora	Leonor Lucchini		SBT
2003	Celebridade	Hercília Prudente da Costa		TV Globo
2004	A Escrava Isaura	Gertrudes Almeida		RecordTV
2005	Floribella	Corina Bittencourt	Season 1	Rede Bandeirantes
2006	Alta Estação	Ms Sofia	Special appearance	RecordTV
2007	Malhação	Dionísia Pimenta	Season 14–15	TV Globo
2009	Tudo Novo de Novo	Ms Luci	Episode: "Evasões"	TV Globo
2009	Cama de Gato	Irmã Andréia		TV Globo
2011	Insensato Coração	Olga Brandão		TV Globo
2012	As Brasileiras	Glédis	Episode: "A Culpada de BH"	TV Globo
2012	Carrossel	Ruth Soares	Special appearance	SBT
2013	Joia Rara	Mama Francesca Baldo		TV Globo
2013	Malhação Casa Cheia	Nun	Season 21	TV Globo
2015	Além do Tempo	Sister Lúcia	First phase	TV Globo
2015	Além do Tempo	Matilde	Second phase	TV Globo
2018	Amigo de Aluguel	Ida	Episódio: "Os Canastrões"	Universal TV

=== Films ===
Year	Title	Role
1956	Sai de Baixo	The Young Lady
1959	Minervina Vem Aí	Nini
1960	Cala a boca, Etelvina	The Young Lady
1961	O Dono da Bola	Eva
1961	Mulheres e Milhões	Girlfriend
1962	Assassinato em Copacabana	Lalá
1962	Carnival of Crime	Secretary
1965	O Beijo	Dália
1968	As Sete Faces de Um Cafajeste	Lilian
1968	Vidas Estranhas	Marina
1976	O casamento	Glorinha
1982	Amor de Perversão	Sílvia
1984	Jeitosa, um Assunto Muito Particular	Ms Rosa
1987	Sonhos de menina-moça	Clarisse
1987	Vera	Isolda
2014	Operação Orquídea	Adélia Junqueira
2017	Entre Amores	Malva
2023	As Aparecidas	Otília's friend
2024	Evidências do Amor	Ms Aurélia

== Stage ==
- 1959 – Nossa cidade, by Thornton Wilder
- 1962 – Você pode ser pai, by Alexandre Bisson and Vast Ricouard
- 1962 – Oscar, by Claude Magnier
- 1962/1963 – A terceira pessoa, by Andrew Rosenthal
- 1964 – A quinta cabeça, by Marcel Aymé
- 1964 – Weekend, by Noël Coward
- 1965 – Electra, by Sophocles
- 1966 – As inocentes do Leblon, by Barillet and Gredy
- 1976/1978– Cinderela do petróleo, by João Bethencourt
- 1981/1982 – A bomba de Elizabeth, by Álvaro Valle
- 1982/1983 – Adorável Júlia, by Somerset Maugham
- 1988 – Os amores de Casanova
- 1989 – Tutti buona gente
- 1989/1992 – Além da vida, by Chico Xavier
- 1996/1998 – Francisco e Clara
- 2000/2001 – E a Vida Continua, by Chico Xavier
- 2003 – O despertar dos anjos, by Gabriel Veiga Castellani
- 2005 – Show Coração Seresteiro
- 2019 – Quatro Atrizes e um Personagem
- 2023 – O que vamos fazer com o Walter?
