= O Seminarista =

1872 novel by Bernardo Guimarães

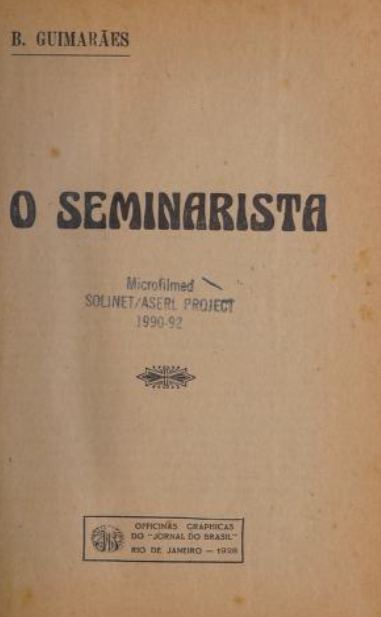
- Title page for O Seminarista (1928 edition)
- Author: Bernardo Guimarães
- Language: Portuguese
- Genre: Romance
- Publication date: 1872
- Publication place: Brazil
- Media type: Hardcover

O Seminarista (in English: The Seminarian) is a novel by Brazilian writer Bernardo Guimarães, first published in 1872. It heavily criticizes celibacy, and the authoritarianism and patriarchy in 19th-century Brazilian families.

== Plot ==
The book is set in the city of Itapecerica (then called Vila de Tamanduá), in Minas Gerais. Eugênio and Margarida are two childhood friends who love each other, but following orders of his father, Eugênio is sent to a seminary, in order to become a priest. However, he is not able to forget Margarida, and feels torn between religiosity and the pleasures of flesh.

Despite his numerous inner conflicts, he finally receives his ordination and becomes a priest. Returning to his hometown in order to celebrate his first mass, he discovers that Margarida is very sick and nearly dying. Unable to restrain himself, he and Margarida engage in sexual intercourse. Unbeknownst to him, she dies shortly after he leaves.

Later on, Eugênio goes on celebrating his first mass – a requiem mass. However, when he discovers that the mass is being made in honor of a deceased Margarida, he has a mental breakdown and, taking off his priest vests, runs away of the church, in a frenzy and completely naked.

== Characters ==
- Eugênio — the main protagonist of the novel.
- Margarida — Eugênio's childhood friend and love interest.
- Francisco Antunes — Eugênio's father. A very austere military man.
- Mrs. Antunes — Eugênio's mother. She has no autonomy on the house, doing only what Francisco tells her to do.
- Mrs. Umbelina — Margarida's mother, and a widow.
