= O Noviço =

- Genre: Drama; Romantic comedy
- Created by: Mário Lago
- Based on: O Noviço by Martins Pena
- Directed by: Herval Rossano
- Starring: Pedro Paulo Rangel; Jorge Dória; Isabel Ribeiro; Maria Cristina Nunes; André Valli; Marilu Bueno
- Country of origin: Brazil
- Original language: Portuguese
- No. of episodes: 20

Production
- Running time: 50 minutes

Original release
- Network: TV Globo
- Release: 2 June – 27 June 1975

O Noviço is a Brazilian telenovela produced and broadcast by TV Globo between 2 June and 27 June 1975, running 20 episodes. It succeeded Helena and preceded Senhora, being the fifth 6 PM telenovela broadcast by TV Globo, being produced in black and white.

Created by Mário Lago and based on the homonymous play by Martins Pena, it was directed by Herval Rossano.

It starred Pedro Paulo Rangel in the role of Carlos.

== Cast ==
Interprete	Personagem
Pedro Paulo Rangel	Carlos
Jorge Dória	Ambrósio
Isabel Ribeiro	Florência
Maria Cristina Nunes	Emília
Fábio Mássimo	Juca
Marilu Bueno	Rosa
Luís Linhares	Flávio
Haroldo de Oliveira	Josué
Germano Filho	Abade
André Valli	Master Priest
Luiz Magnelli	Meirinho Xenxém
Lajar Muzuris	Zé Piaba
Jotta Barroso	Sebastião
Pedro Veras	Novice
Eliano Medeiros	Novice
Marcelo Heleno	Novice
Jacy Nascentes	Novice
Luiz Carlos Buruca	Novice

== Production ==
This was the second mininovela produced by TV Globo. The goal was to have the 6 pm timeslot for telenovelas on TV Globo.

It had scenes recorded on the Pontal of Barra da Tijuca, on the Largo do Boticário and on Globo studios on Rio de Janeiro. For the flashback scenes, some special sets were built, with the production of Arlindo Rodrigues. These had a neutral background and were framed in the main set.

It was the last 6 PM telenovela to be broadcast in black and white by TV Globo. Of all 20 episodes only a few scenes and the opening were preserved in TV Globo's collection.

== Broadcasting ==
It was rerun between 26 July and 20 August 1976, on 1:30 pm, succeeding its original succeeder Senhora and being preceded by A Moreninha.
