= Senhora (novel) =

Novel by José de Alencar

Senhora is a novel written by the Brazilian writer José de Alencar. It was first published in 1875, two years before the author's death. It was the third book by the author about the position of women in Brazil's 19th century Rio de Janeiro society (the other two being Diva and Lucíola), published under the pseudonym G.M.

== Synopsis ==
Aurélia Camargo, daughter to a poor family, falls in love with an ambitious man named Fernando Seixas, to whom she had been engaged. Nevertheless, Fernando ends up breaking up the relationship, wanting to marry into a wealthy estate instead, deciding for a certain Adelaide Amarala, from whose father he would be given a large dowry according to the law. After the death of Aurelia's father, however, Aurélia receives a large inheritance from her grandfather (of whom she wasn't aware of having been wealthy), thus rising in social rank. Due to being of a great beauty, she then turns into a great sensation on the parties and events frequented at the time. Thus, torn between the love she feels and her injured pride, she then places her uncle Lemos in charge of an offer negotiation to Fernando Seixas that includes a large amount of money intended for him to marry her. The deal states however, that the identity of the bride should remain secret until the day after the Wedding, effectively impeding the husband to know for sure whom he shall marry. Finally, when he finds out that Aurélia is his bride, Fernando becomes elated, for he had actually never really stopped loving her. He then opens up his heart to Aurelia and confesses his love for her. Young Aurelia, however, on their first night together, makes a very clear point: He had been "purchased" by her to become a husband that a woman of her social position should have, doing just as she should wish. They sleep in different rooms. She doesn't want to be his and takes every opportunity she has to criticize him with sarcasm and irony.

== See also ==
- 1875 in literature
- Senhora (telenovela), a 1975 Brazilian adaptation of this novel
