= Seus Olhos =

Brazilian soap opera

- Genre: Drama, romance
- Created by: Aimar Labaki
- Based on: La Gata by Inés Rodena
- Written by: Inés Rodena; Ecila Pedroso; Mário Viana; Marcos Lazarini
- Screenplay by: Aimar Labaki; Fabio Brandi Torres; Noemi Marinho
- Directed by: Jacques Lagôa; Henrique Martins
- Starring: Carla Regina; Juan Alba; Thierry Figueira; Petrônio Gontijo
- Opening theme: " Este seu Olhar" by Adryana Ribeiro
- Country of origin: Brazil
- Original language: Portuguese
- No. of seasons: 1
- No. of episodes: 173

Production
- Cinematography: Augusto Black
- Running time: 45 minutes
- Production company: SBT

Original release
- Network: SBT
- Release: 18 May – 4 December 2004

Related
- La gata

Seus Olhos ("your eyes") is a Brazilian soap opera produced by SBT from 18 May 2004 to 4 December 2004, comprising 173 episodes. Based on the Mexican telenovela La gata, written by Inés Rodena, it was adapted to the Portuguese language.

== Plot ==
Seus Olhos is the story of two young people in love who experience prejudice and intolerance due to an unknown past. The series is divided into three phases.

=== Phase one ===
The first phase takes place in São Paulo in the 1980s. Marina, a 21-year-old aspiring painter whose father died when she was young, lives with her mother, Edite. She is pursued by Vítor, a successful lawyer for a shipbuilding company whose heir, Tiago, is also in love with her. Marina doesn't know that Vítor is married to Elaine and has a two-year-old son, Artur.

Edite dies, leaving Marina orphaned, and the young girl turns to Vítor. After finding out about his wife, however, she immediately breaks up with him. She grows closer to Tiago instead, and the friendship turns into love and eventually marriage. Flávia, Marina's friend, marries Sérgio, the company's vice president, at the same time, and they both become pregnant.

During the subsequent nine months, Vítor embezzles the company's money. When Sérgio finds out, he fights with Vítor, who ends up killing him and blaming the death on Tiago. He then confesses everything to Marina and gives her newborn daughter, Renata, all the money he stole. Marina is outraged. The two fight and, in the end, Vítor murders Marina. Desperate, he looks for evidence to blame Tiago, who, despite being innocent, is tried and sentenced to thirty years in prison.

Flávia also gives birth to a girl, Cibele. The fates of Cibele and Renata will cross twenty years later. Renata is kidnapped by Dirce, who uses her as a servant.

=== Phase two ===
The second phase begins eight years later. Renata still lives with Dirce, who exploits her as much as she can. Vítor gives up working at the shipbuilding company to set up his own law firm, in addition to working for organized crime. Dirce's social worker, Norma, meets Renata and is moved by the girl's condition. She decides to file a legal case against Dirce, after which Renata is removed from the abusive woman's care. Cibele is raised by her grandparents in São Paulo, far from her mother. Renata forms a friendship with Artur, who soon falls in love with her. He teaches her to read and write, and she discovers a passion for drawing, which she inherited from her late mother.

=== Phase three ===
Twelve more years pass. Due to their class differences, Renata and Artur date in secret. Vítor and Elaine celebrate their 25th wedding anniversary. On the occasion, Artur finally introduces Renata to his family as his future bride. His mother freaks out, however, and kicks her future daughter-in-law out of the house.

Vítor is amazed at the resemblance between Renata and Marina, and immediately suspects that she is the girl who disappeared many years ago. The passion he once felt for Marina is rekindled in the figure of Renata, who is identical to her mother. A love triangle subsequently forms between Vítor, Artur, and Renata. Elaine fears that the story of more than twenty years before is repeating itself, and she is willing to do whatever it takes not to lose Vítor.

Renata moves to the loft that belonged to her mother and, when she finds a portrait of Marina taken at the maternity hospital, she gradually learns the truth. She and Artur will have to overcome the traumas of the past and the obstacles of the present in order to have a happy romance.

== Cast and characters ==
- Carla Regina as Marina / Renata (adult)
- Juan Alba as Tiago
- Thierry Figueira as Artur Meirelles
- Françoise Forton as Elaine Meirelles
- Petrônio Gontijo as Vítor Meirelles
- Bete Mendes as Edite
- Adriana Londoño as Flávia
- Carmo Dalla Vecchia as Sérgio
- Thávyne Ferrari as young Renata
- Christina Dieckmann as Cibele
- Lu Grimaldi as Dirce
- Bete Coelho as Norma

== Soundtrack ==
- Adryana Ribeiro – "Este Seu Olhar"
- Paula Lima – "O Olhar Do Amor"
- LS Jack – "Aquele Olhar"
- Flávio Venturini – "Sonhos E Pedras"
- Alcione – "Enquanto Houver Saudade"
- Lucinha Lins – "Jura Secreta"
- Josee Koning – "Coração Saudade"
- Bezerra da Silva – "Malandro Rife"
- Ana Carolina – "Vox Populi"
- Rouge – "Blá Blá Blá"
- Jackson do Pandeiro – "Sebastiana"
- Luis Miguel – "Tu Me Aconstumbraste"
