= Carla Cabral =

Brazilian actress

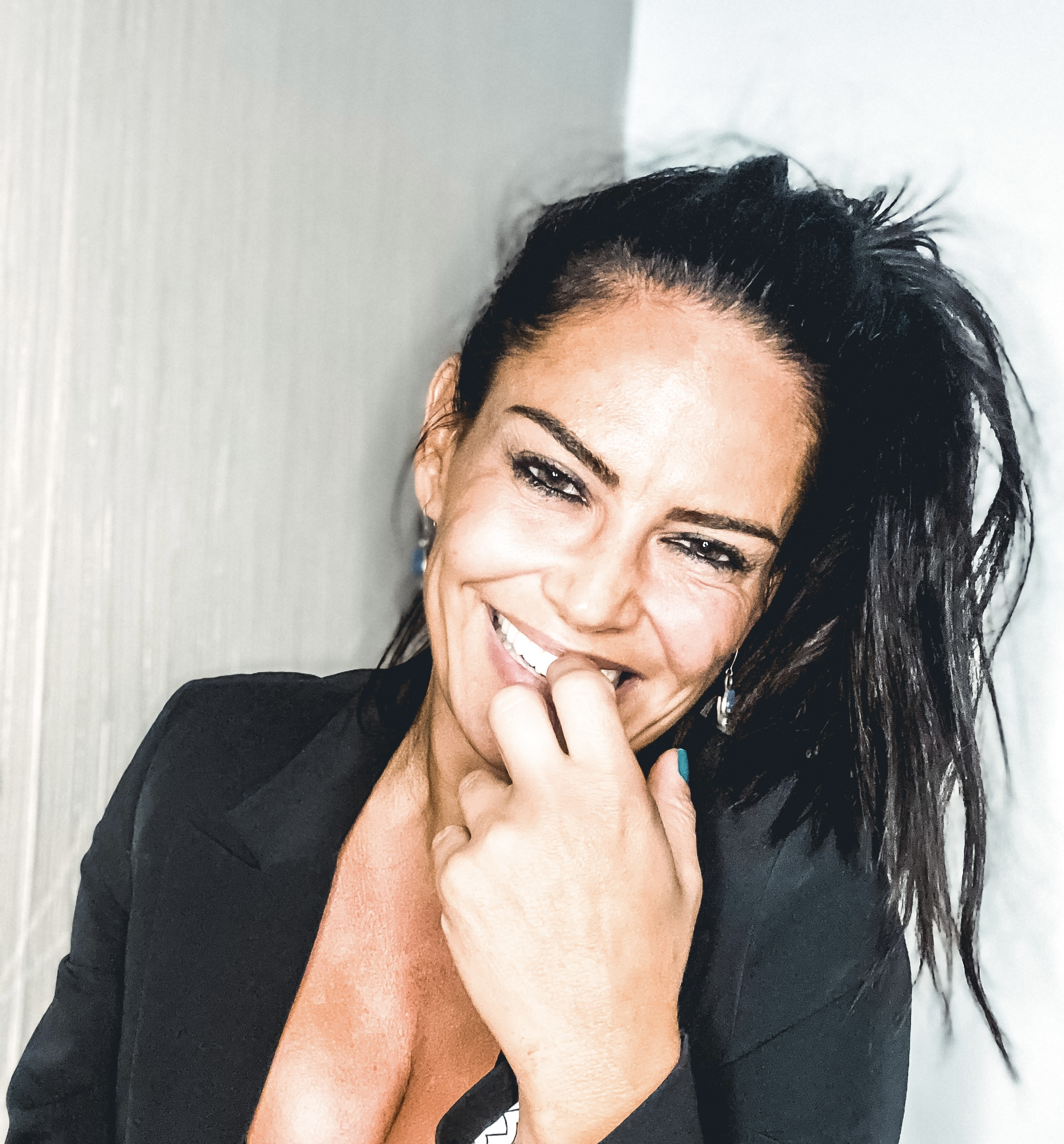
- Born: Carla Regina Freitas Cabral; 21 October 1976 (age 48); Limeira, Brazil
- Other names: Carla Regina
- Occupation: Actress
- Spouse: Malcolm Montgomery

Carla Regina Freitas Cabral (born 21 October 1976) is a Brazilian actress.

== Career ==
Carla was discovered by Walter Avancini and appeared in four novels by the director in the Rede Manchete, usually in the main cast, being a romantic heroine in Xica da Silva and protagonist in Mandacaru.

Participated in some work at Rede Globo, such as O Clone, A Casa das Sete Mulheres, among others. She was the protagonist of the soap opera Seus Olhos, at the SBT in 2004. In soap operas at Rede Record, she participated in Essas Mulheres, playing the beautiful courtesan Lúcia, a character freely inspired by a novel by José de Alencar. In Cidadão Brasileiro, was the wife of the protagonist Antônio Maciel (Gabriel Braga Nunes).

In 2004 he starred opposite Fábio Assunção, his first feature Espelho D’Água, directed by the renowned Carla Camurati. The actress was in the cast of the feature film Pedaço de Santo, by Marco Simas, filmed in 2009.

In 2009 the actress was part of the cast of Bela, a Feia, of Record, like Cíntia.

She changed her stage name of Carla Regina to Carla Cabral. The first TV job on which he was credited like this was José do Egito. And in the same year (2013) the actress is listed in the cast of Pecado Mortal of Carlos Lombardi, in the film the actress will be Laura Leblon. The year 2016 marks his exit from Rede Record.

== Filmography ==
=== Television ===
| Year | Title | Role | Notes |
|---|---|---|---|
| 1994 | Quatro por Quatro | Jussara | Participation |
| 1995 | Malhação | Jane | Season 1; Support cast |
| 1995 | Tocaia Grande | Diva | |
| 1996 | Xica da Silva | Maria das Dores Gonçalo | |
| 1997 | Mandacaru | Juliana Guedes | |
| 1998 | Brida | Elisa | |
| 1999 | Chiquinha Gonzaga | Alice | |
| 1999 | Andando nas Nuvens | Ana Paula | |
| 1999 | Você Decide | Laila | Episode: "Liberdade" |
| 2000 | Você Decide | Sílvia | Episode: "Golpe de Mestre" |
| 2000 | Marcas da Paixão | Margarida Pereira Maia (Guida) | |
| 2002 | O Clone | Dora | Support cast |
| 2003 | A Casa das Sete Mulheres | Tina | |
| 2003 | Malhação | Ana Paula | Season 10 |
| 2004 | Seus Olhos | Marina / Renata | |
| 2005 | Essas Mulheres | Maria da Glória Assunção / Lúcia Bicallo | |
| 2006 | Cidadão Brasileiro | Carolina Castanho | |
| 2007 | Guerra e Paz | Dorinha | Television pilot |
| 2008 | Casos e Acasos | Carol | Episode: "O Flagra, a Demissão e a Adoção" |
| 2008 | Os Mutantes - Caminhos do Coração | Queen ant | Participation |
| 2009 | Bela, a Feia | Cíntia Alcântara | |
| 2013 | José do Egito | Bilhah | |
| 2013 | Pecado Mortal | Laura Leblon | |

=== Films ===
| Year | Title | Role |
|---|---|---|
| 2003 | O Caminho das Nuvens | Mexican actress |
| 2004 | Espelho D'água - Viagem ao Rio São Francisco | Celeste |
| 2011 | As Doze Estrelas | Ângela Vésper |
| 2012 | O Grande Kilapy | Beldade |
