= Bianca Rinaldi =

Brazilian actress (born 1974)

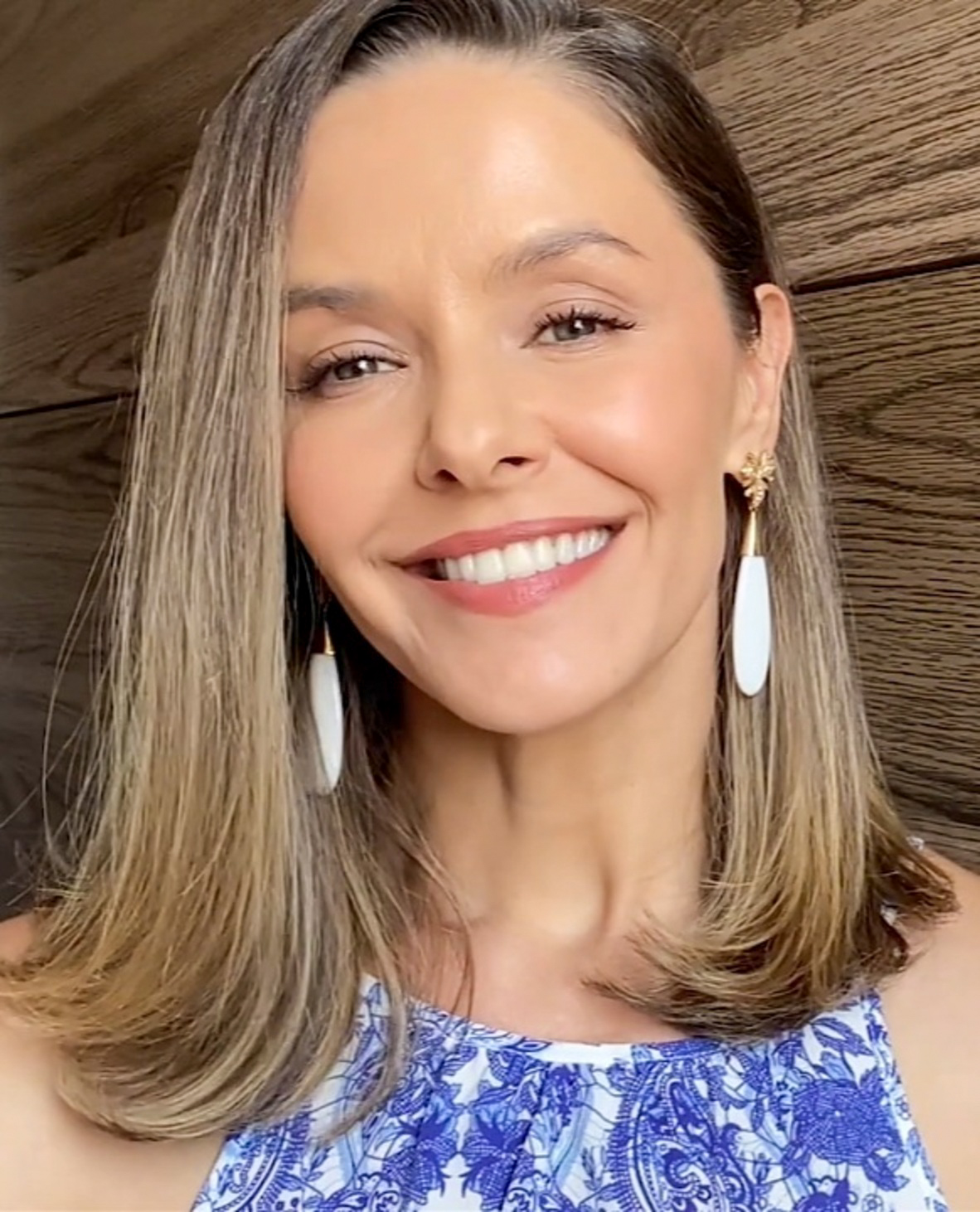
- Rinaldi, 2020
- Born: Bianca de Carvalho e Silva Rinaldi; October 15, 1974 (age 51); São Paulo, Brazil
- Occupation: Actress
- Years active: 1990–present
- Spouse: Eduardo Menga (m. 2002)
- Children: 2
- Website: http://www.biancarinaldi.com.br/

Bianca de Carvalho e Silva Rinaldi (born October 15, 1974) is a Brazilian actress. She is best known for her roles in telenovelas, especially A Escrava Isaura.

== Biography ==
Rinaldi was born in São Paulo, Brazil. She trained as a gymnast from age 8 to 13. She began her TV career in 1990 when she was chosen to be a "Paquita" for Xuxa's Show. She left the show in 1995 to pursue an acting career in Brazilian TV and theater.

At 19, she decided to study the art of interpretation, thus beginning her work in television and theater. In Malhação, still in Rede Globo, the teacher played Úrsula.

She received critical acclaim from the Brazilian media for her work on Pícara Sonhadora and A Escrava Isaura.

In 2010, Arminda was the protagonist in the novel Ribeirão do Tempo. In 2013, lived Tany character of José do Egito.

In March 2013, Rinaldi did not renew her contract with Rede Record, where she worked at since 2004.

With the non-renewal of this contract with Rede Record, the role she would play in the novel Pecado Mortal, Carlos Lombardi, was awarded to Simone Spoladore.

In the second half of 2013, the actress signed a contract with Rede Globo. She was cast in the soap opera Em Família.

== Personal life ==
Rinaldi has been married to Eduardo Menga since January 1, 2002. They have twin daughters, Beatriz Menga and Sofia Menga (born on May 10, 2009).

== Career ==
=== Television ===
Year	Title	Role	Notes
1990	Xou da Xuxa	Xiquita Bibi	
1993	Programa Xuxa	Xiquita Bibi	
1994	Xuxa Park	Xiquita Bibi	
1995	Cara & Coroa	Mari	Cameo
1995	Explode Coração	Daniela	Cameo
1995	Xuxa Especial de Natal - Deu a louca na Fantasia	Princess	Christmas special
1997	Malhação	Teacher Úrsula	
1998	Você Decide		Episode: "Desencontro"
1998	Você Decide		Episode: "Vida"
1998	Chiquititas	Andréa	
1999	Terra Nostra	Adele	Cameo
2001	Xuxa no Mundo da Imaginação	Witch	Picture: "A Bruxa Keka"
2001	Pícara Sonhadora	Ludmilla "Mila" Lopes	
2001	SBT Palace Hotel	Laraiáh (Neta de Dercy Gonçalves)	Cameo
2002	Pequena Travessa	Júlia/Júlio	
2004	Meu Cunhado		Cameo
2004	A Escrava Isaura	Isaura dos Anjos	
2005	Prova de Amor	Joana Marinho	
2005	Ressoar	Herself	Host
2007	Caminhos do Coração	Maria Beatriz dos Santos Luz Mayer	
2008	Os Mutantes: Caminhos do Coração	Maria Beatriz/Samira Mayer	
2010	Ribeirão do Tempo	Arminda Caligari	
2011	O Madeireiro	Laura	Special End of Year
2012	Extreme Makeover Social	Herself	Host
2013	José do Egito	Tany	
2013	Se Eu Fosse Você: A Série	Giovanna	
2014	Em Família	Sílvia	
2023	A Infância de Romeu e Julieta	Vera Monteiro	

=== Film ===
Year	Title	Role	Notes
1990	Lua de Cristal	Student music and Fairy	
1990	Sonho de Verão	Bianca	
2004	Didi Quer Ser Criança	Owner of the raffle	Cameo
2007	Turma da Mônica - Uma Aventura no Tempo	Voice of black hair	Animation
2013	Sinal	Laura	Short film

=== Theater ===
Year	Title
1999	As Meninas
2001	Aluga-se um Namorado
2003	Tudo de Mim
2004	A Pedra Mágica
2005	Jeitinho Brasileiro
2006	A Vida Intima de Laura
2007	Amor de Comédia
2012	Eu, Tu, Eles
2013	A Falecida

== Film ==
- An Adventure on time (Uma aventura no tempo) (2007)
- Didi Wanna be child (Didi quer ser criança) (2004)
- Summer Dream (Sonho de Verão) (1994)
- Crystal Moon (Lua de Cristal) (1990)
