= Martins Pena =

Brazilian playwright

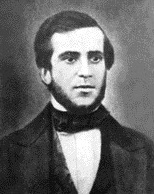
- A photograph of Pena
- Born: Luís Carlos Martins Pena; November 5, 1815; Rio de Janeiro, Kingdom of Brazil
- Died: December 7, 1848 (aged 33); Lisbon, Kingdom of Portugal
- Education: Escola Nacional de Belas Artes
- Occupation: Playwright
- Writing career
- Notable works: O Noviço, Quem Casa Quer Casa, O Juiz de Paz na Roça
- Movement: Romanticism

Luís Carlos Martins Pena (November 5, 1815 – December 7, 1848) was a Brazilian playwright, famous for introducing to Brazil the "comedy of manners", winning the epithet of "the Brazilian Molière".

He is patron of the 29th chair of the Brazilian Academy of Letters.

== Life ==
Martins Pena was born in Rio de Janeiro, to João Martins Pena and Francisca de Paula Julieta Pena. Losing his father when he was 1 year old, and his mother when he was 10, he was delivered to the care of tutors, who ingressed him at the world of commerce. However, seeing that it was not what he wanted, he entered at the Escola Nacional de Belas Artes in 1835, learning Architecture, Statuary, Drawing and Music. Entering at the Ministry of Foreign Affairs in 1838, he travelled to many countries, such as England, where he contracted tuberculosis. Moving to Lisbon in an unsuccessful attempt of mitigating the disease, he died in 1848.

== Works ==
- O Juiz de Paz na Roça (1838)
- Itaminda, ou O Guerreiro de Tupã (1839)
- A Família e a Festa na Roça (1840)
- Vitiza, ou O Nero de Espanha (1841)
- O Judas no Sábado de Aleluia (1844)
- O Namorador, ou A Noite de São João (1845)
- Os Três Médicos (1845)
- A Barriga do Meu Tio (1846)
- Os Ciúmes de um Pedestre, ou O Terrível Capitão do Mato (1846)
- As Desgraças de uma Criança (1846)
- O Diletante (1846)
- Os Meirinhos (1846)
- Um Segredo de Estado (1846)
- O Caixeiro da Taverna (1847)
- Os Irmãos das Almas (1847)
- Quem Casa Quer Casa (1847)
- O Noviço (1853; posthumous)
- Os Dois e o Inglês Maquinista (1871; posthumous)

== See also ==
- 1838 in literature

Preceded by New creation	Brazilian Academy of Letters – Patron of the 29th chair	Succeeded by Artur Azevedo (founder)
