= A Sucessora =

Novel by Carolina Nabuco

- Book cover of the 3rd edition (1940s)
- Author: Carolina Nabuco
- Publication date: 1934
- Media type: Print

A Sucessora is a novel written by the Brazilian writer Carolina Nabuco. It was first published in 1934 and was later adapted into the 1978 telenovela A Sucessora.

== Synopsis ==
The story revolves around the character of Mariana, a young woman who has married the widower Roberto Steen. As Mariana attempts to acclimatise to her new marriage and responsibilities, she discovers that Steen's dead wife, Alice, still seems to have a hold over the household.

== Controversy ==
Nabuco's A Sucessora (The Successor), published in 1934, has a main plot similar to Rebecca, for example a young woman marrying a widower and the strange presence of the first wife—plot features also shared with the far older Jane Eyre.

A Sucessora received international attention after the publication of Daphne du Maurier's 1938 novel Rebecca, which presented striking similarities to Nabuco's novel. Critic Álvaro Lins remarked in 1941 that there was little difference between the two novels. In the wake of the film, The New York Times Book Review published an article highlighting the novels' many similarities prompting du Maurier to rebuff claims of plagiarism in a Letter to the Editor, where she wrote that she had not heard of Nabuco or A Sucessora until the previous year. Du Maurier's publishers also denied any intentional similarities between the two works, although Nabuco herself believed that her work had been plagiarized. Nabuco also claimed that producers of the theatrical version of Rebecca came to her with a contract that would state that the similarities between the two books were coincidental and that she would be "compensated with a quantity described as 'of considerable value'" if she signed.
