= Pedro Neschling =

Brazilian actor (b. 1982)

- Born: 28 June 1982 (age 43); Rio de Janeiro, Brazil
- Occupations: Actor; director; writer
- Years active: 2000–present
- Spouses: Luiza Possi (m. 2007; div. 2009) Vitória Frate (m. 2010; div. 2020)
- Children: 1
- Parents: John Neschling (father); Lucélia Santos (mother)
- Website: nesch.com.br

Pedro Henrique dos Santos Neschling (born 28 June 1982) is a Brazilian actor, director and writer.

== Personal life ==
Neschling is the son of John Neschling, composer and conductor, and of Lucélia Santos, actress and director. He has Jewish roots on his paternal side.

His first television role was in the TV series Sítio do Picapau Amarelo in 2003.

== Filmography ==
=== Television ===
As actor
Year	Title	Role
2003	Sítio do Picapau Amarelo	Percival
2004	Da Cor do Pecado	Dionísio Sardinha
2004	As Cartas de Chico Xavier	
2004	Correndo Atrás	Pena
2005	A Lua Me Disse	Murilo Queiroz (Murilinho)
2005	Na Trilha da Fama	
2005	Clara e o Chuveiro do Tempo	Elvis Presley
2006	Se Liga na Busca	
2006	Páginas da Vida	Rafael Salles Martins de Andrade
2007	Desejo Proibido	Diogo Boticário
2008	Casos e Acasos	
2008–11	Aline	Pedro
2012	As Brasileiras	Maurício
2013	Joia Rara	Arlindo Pacheco Leão Filho (Arlindinho)
2024	Renascer	Eriberto Ramos

As writer
Year	Title	Notes
2020–21	Salve-se Quem Puder	Telenovela

=== Film ===
As actor
Year	Title	Role
2005	Um Lobisomem na Amazônia	
2006	O Diário de Tati	
2007	Um Homem Qualquer	

As director
Year	Title	Notes
2000	Vou Zoar Até Morrer	Short-film
2002	As Vozes da Verdade	Short-film

As writer
Year	Title	Notes
2000	Vou Zoar Até Morrer	Short-film
2001	Timor Lorosae: The Unseen Massacre	Documentary
2002	As Vozes da Verdade	Short-film

== Theater ==
Year	Title	Role	Notes
2001	De Caso Com a Vida		
2003–05	Sem Vergonhas		
2004	Apenas Uma Noite		As writer
2006	O Livro Secreto		
2007	Trindade		
2008	A Forma das Coisas		As director
2010	Estragaram todos os meus sonhos, seus cães miseráveis!		As director
2011	Alguém Acaba de Morrer Lá Fora		As director
2012	Como Nossos Pais		As writer, director and actor
