= O Preço de um Homem =

- Created by: Ody Fraga
- Directed by: Henrique Martins
- Starring: Arlete Montenegro; Adriano Reys; Elaine Cristina; Carlos Alberto Riccelli
- Country of origin: Brazil
- Original language: Portuguese
- No. of episodes: 192

Production
- Running time: 50 minutes

Original release
- Network: Rede Tupi
- Release: 15 November 1971 – 24 June 1972

O Preço de um Homem is a Brazilian telenovela produced and broadcast by Rede Tupi, between 15 November 1971 and 24 June 1972 in 192 episodes. It was broadcast on 8 pm.

It was created by Ody Fraga based on the novel Senhora by José de Alencar, and it was directed by Henrique Martins.

This is the third Brazilian adaptation of the novel, as TV Paulista broadcast an adaptation in 1953, and Rede Tupi broadcast another in 1962.

Of the 192 originally shown episodes, only 2 were preserved, being under the guard of Cinemateca Brasileira.

== Cast ==
- Arlete Montenegro as Rosa
- Adriano Reys as Mário
- Elaine Cristina as Celeste
- Carlos Alberto Riccelli as Lucas
- Jayme Barcellos as Roberval
- Yara Lins as Marcinha
- Flávio Galvão as Carlos
- Silvio Francisco as João
- Eleonor Bruno as Sofia
- Aldo César as Maneco
- Júlia Miranda as Maura
- Eudósia Acuña as Santa
- Rildo Gonçalves as Azevedo
- Araquem Saldanha as Jofre
- Paulo Figueiredo as Ricardo
- Elísio de Albuquerque as Joaquim
- Maria Helena Dias as Marisa
- Olívia Camargo as Ema
- Selma Egrei as Léa
- Cleyde Ruth as Júlia
- José Parisi Jr. as Cuca
- Procópio Ferreira as Marcelo
- Henrique Martins as Buyer
- Graça Mello as Romero
- Aracy Cardoso as Dinorah
