= A Escrava Isaura (novel) =

Novel by Bernardo Guimarães

- Author: Bernardo Guimarães
- Language: Portuguese
- Genre: romance novel, propaganda
- Published: 1875 (Casa Garnier)
- Publication place: Brazil

A Escrava Isaura (Portuguese pronunciation: [a (i)ʃˈkɾavɐ iˈzawɾɐ], Isaura, The Slave Girl) is a novel written by the Brazilian writer Bernardo Guimarães. It was first published in 1875 by Casa Garnier publishers in Rio de Janeiro. With this novel, Bernardo Guimarães became very famous throughout that country, even said to be admired by Brazil's last Emperor Dom Pedro II.

In 1976, a Brazilian telenovela adaptation produced by Rede Globo was titled Escrava Isaura. It was a worldwide success.

In 2004, a second Brazilian telenovela was produced by TV Record. It was also titled A Escrava Isaura. This adaptation also aired on Telemundo in the United States. This version was dubbed into Spanish and titled La Esclava Isaura.

The title character is so pale-skinned that she is "almost white", making her the Brazilian equivalent of Eliza, from Harriet Beecher Stowe's Uncle Tom's Cabin.

== Story ==
Isaura, the daughter of a Portuguese worker and a freed black woman, is an enslaved girl who endures hard times before she is freed and finally marries her star-crossed lover, Álvaro. Meanwhile, she suffers greatly at the hands of Leôncio Almeida, the owner of a plantation and main villain in the plot, who wants to make her a concubine. She even becomes briefly engaged to the humpback dwarf Melchior and almost marries him to avoid prostitution, before Álvaro comes in her aid.
