= Pietro Mário =

Brazilian actor (1939–2020)

Pietro Mário (1939 – August 31, 2020) was an Italian-born Brazilian actor, who was known for dubbing the role of Yoda.

Mário died from post-COVID-19 causes in 2020, aged 81.
