= Escrava Isaura (1976 TV series) =

1976–1977 Brazilian telenovela

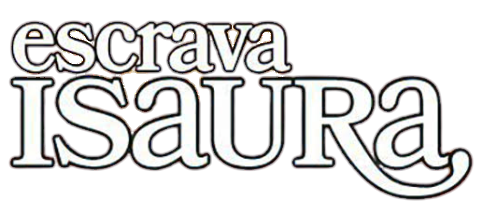
- Genre: Telenovela; Romance; Drama
- Created by: Bernardo Guimarães
- Developed by: Gilberto Braga
- Starring: Lucélia Santos; Rubens de Falco
- Country of origin: Brazil
- Original language: Portuguese
- No. of episodes: 100

Production
- Producer: Henrique Daniel
- Production locations: Campos, Rio de Janeiro
- Running time: 60 min

Original release
- Network: TV Globo
- Release: 11 October 1976 – 5 February 1977

Escrava Isaura (Isaura: Slave Girl) is a 1976 Brazilian telenovela produced by TV Globo, originally broadcast between 11 October 1976 and 5 February 1977. Based on the 1865 novel of the same name by 19th century abolitionist writer Bernardo Guimarães, it tells the story of the struggles of Isaura, a white-skinned slave, to find happiness during the Brazilian Empire. It starred Lucélia Santos in the title role and Rubens de Falco as slave owner Leôncio Almeida, the main antagonist. It was adapted by Gilberto Braga and directed by Herval Rossano and Milton Gonçalves, running 100 episodes.

== Plot ==
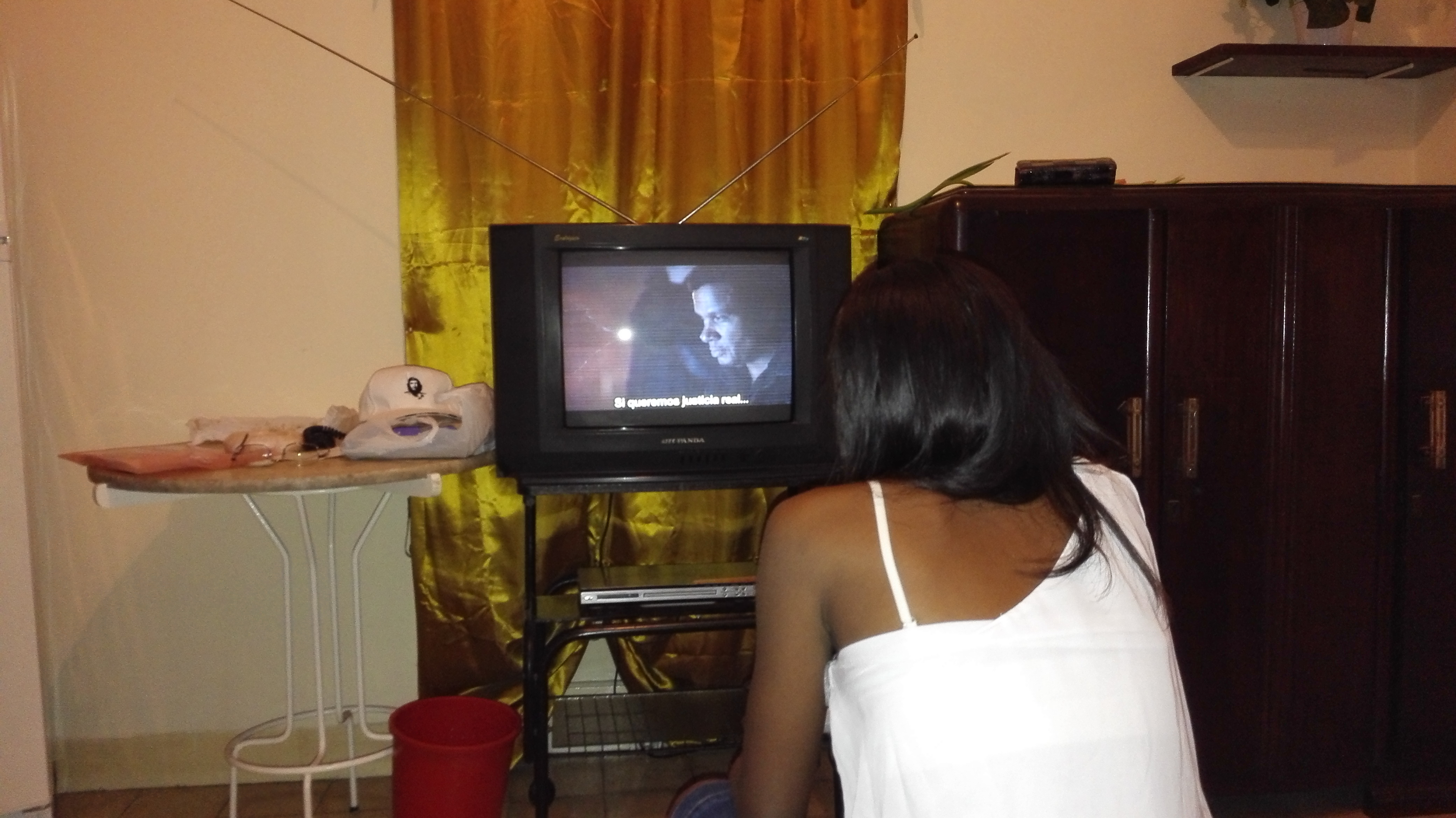
Young woman watching Escrava Isaura. Havana, Cuba. 2015

The story is set in Brazil in the 1860s, 20 years before the emancipation of slaves. Isaura, a white-skinned slave, the daughter of a mixed-race slave and a white overseer, lives in the house of Comendador Almeida and his wife Dona Ester in Rio de Janeiro. Dona Ester raised her as her own daughter. She is educated and beautiful but very modest. Almost everyone likes her, especially Januaria, the cook, who is a mother figure to her. However, her master, the Comendador, is not particularly fond of Isaura and forbids Dona Ester from letting her dine with them like a family member. Another person who hates her is the black slave Rosa, who detests the privileged life Isaura leads.

At the beginning of the story Leôncio, the Comendador's son arrives home from Paris where he attended university but did not acquire a degree as he was more interested in debauchery. He takes a liking to Isaura and tries to seduce her but she resists. Dona Ester, Leôncio and Isaura soon move to the Almeidas' countryside residence in Campos, where we meet new characters: Francisco the cruel overseer who led the plantation in its owner's absence, André, the newly bought slave who incites Francisco's hatred by his dignity and bravery, and neighbour plantation owners Dona Alba and her children Tobias and Thais. Tobias and Leôncio start to hate each other when Tobias witnesses Leôncio's cruel treatment of a sick slave. Later Tobias meets Isaura who is taking a walk, and they fall in love, but Tobias doesn't know she is a slave. Also, Miguel, the overseer at Tobias's plantation confesses to Isaura that he is her father.

Almeida arrives and introduces Leôncio to Malvina, the daughter of a friend of his. Malvina doesn't know how evil Leôncio is, and she marries him. She is very kind to Isaura. Her maidservant Santa is happy because now she can be close to her beloved André. Dona Ester dies, her last wish is that the Comendador manumits Isaura, which he promises but then he doesn't keep his promise and doesn't give the signed document to Isaura. Tobias learns that Isaura is a slave, and offers to buy and marry her. Leôncio doesn't agree but Dona Carmen, the Comendador's new wife steals the emancipation document and gives it to him. Isaura is now free and preparing for her wedding, but Leôncio kidnaps Tobias and keeps him in an abandoned mill, planning to kill him, and he burns the document that granted Isaura's freedom. Later Malvina discovers Tobias in the mill and frees him, but before they could exit the mill, Leôncio and Francisco – who believe it's Isaura in the mill with Tobias – close the doors and set the mill on fire. Santa witnesses this, but is threatened by Francisco. Leôncio, pretending to be in mourning, goes on a travel, but not before condemning Isaura to regular slave work, in spite of the fact that his friends, including Malvina's brother Henrique, all believe he set her free.

When Leôncio comes back, he's still obsessed with Isaura and offers her a choice: either to become his mistress, or to go to a plantation, where she'll cut sugar cane 14 hours a day. Isaura repeatedly refuses, and Leôncio orders her to be tied out and orders her to be whipped in the morning. When André learns about this he attacks Leôncio, so they tie him out too. Santa alerts Miguel who helps Isaura and André escape.

Isaura, Miguel, André and Santa are on the run, and Leôncio sends slave hunters after them. They settle down on Dona Carmen's estate in a small town in Minas Gerais, Barbacena. Isaura, who now pretends to be a white lady named Dona Elvira, meets and falls in love with Dom Álvaro, who is one of the richest men in Brazil. He is also very modern, and already set all his slaves free. But she knows she can't stay with him as they aren't safe in Brazil, Miguel already bought the ship tickets to the United States where slavery has been abolished three years previously. Before they would leave, Isaura agrees to attend a ball with Álvaro. Here a man called Martinho, who read Leôncio's newspaper ads about his runaway slaves, recognizes her and makes a scandal. Despite help from Álvaro and his lawyer friend, Leôncio manages to take Isaura, André and Santa home, and sends Miguel to prison. He promises Isaura that he will let Miguel be released from prison and sets her free if she marries a man of his choosing – Beltrao, the hunchbacked gardener, whom she doesn't love. Isaura accepts, to set her father free, and also because Rosa wrote a fake letter that makes her believe Álvaro forgot her and married. At the wedding before she marries Beltrão, Álvaro arrives, and reveals that in the past months he managed to pay all those to whom Leôncio owed money, and since the money he owed was way more than his whole property, Leôncio is destitute, and the house, the plantation and everything belongs to Álvaro now. While Leôncio is trying to run away, he meets the overseer Francisco, who has decided to reveal how Leôncio murdered Malvina and Tobias. After a fight with Álvaro, desperate Leôncio shoots himself, and Álvaro, the new master frees all the slaves and asks for Isaura's hand. Rosa tries to poison Isaura but accidentally drinks the poisoned drink herself.

== Cast ==
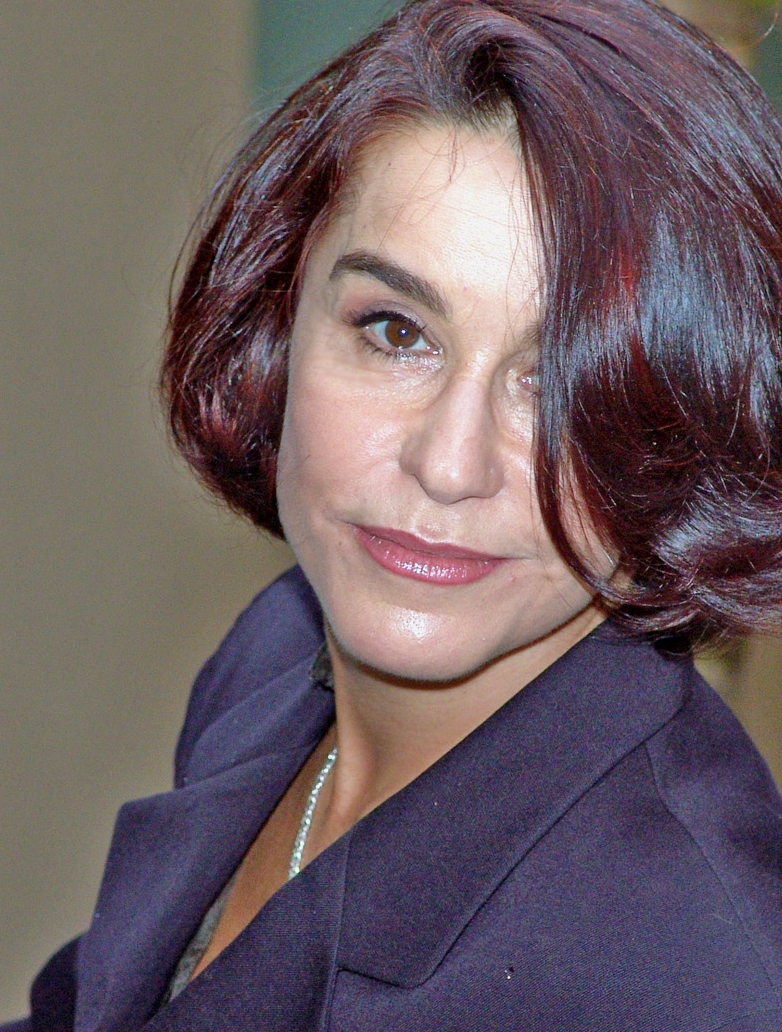
Lucélia Santos

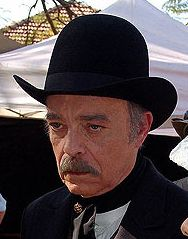
Rubens de Falco

- Lucélia Santos as Isaura/Elvira the slave, main character.
- Rubens de Falco as Leôncio Corea de Almeida, Isaura's master.
- Edwin Luisi as Álvaro, Isaura's second beloved, finally her husband.
- Léa Garcia as Rosa, a slave at the Almeidas who hates Isaura.
- Gilberto Martinho as Comendador Almeida, Leôncio's father. He leaves his countryside mansion and plantation to Leôncio after his marriage, and retires in Rio. At first hostile to Isaura but later becomes sympathetic to her as he witnesses his son's cruel treatment of her.
- Roberto Pirillo as Tobias, Isaura's first love, from the nearby Ibituba Plantation. Killed by Leôncio.
- Norma Blum as Malvina, Leôncio's wife, who is very kind to Isaura. She is accidentally killed by Leôncio.
- Mário Cardoso as Henrique, Malvina's brother, who tries to help Isaura several times.
- Haroldo de Oliveira as André, a slave who is cruelly treated, and later runs away with Miguel and Isaura.
- Maria das Graças as Santa, Malvina's maidservant, later André's wife, runs away with him and Miguel and Isaura.
- Isaac Bardavid as Francisco, the overseer of Leôncio's plantation. Cruel to slaves.
- Zeni Pereira as Januária, the cook. A friend of Isaura and Miguel, she convinced Miguel to reveal to Isaura that he is her father.
- Beatriz Lyra as Ester, Leôncio's mother. Isaura's godmother who raised her.
- Átila Iório as Miguel, the overseer at Ibituba Plantation, and Isaura's father.
- Elisa Fernandes as Taís, sister of Tobias. Later marries Henrique.
- Dary Reis as Conselheiro Fontoura, father of Malvina and Henrique. An old friend of the Comendador's.
- Ângela Leal as Carmen, the Comendador's second wife. Used to be an actress, and is despised by Leôncio.
- Ítalo Rossi as José Matoso, Leôncio's friend who is eager to marry off his sister Aninha, because until then he won't receive his inheritance which he needs because he's in debt.
- Francisco Dantas as Mr. Matoso, Aninha's uncle.
- Myrian Rios as Aninha Matoso, Leôncio's second wife.
- Carlos Duval as Beltrão, gardener, almost Isaura's husband.
- André Valli as Martinho, who betrayed Isaura.
- Clarisse Abujamra as Lúcia, a girl in Barbacena. Her parents wanted her to marry Álvaro and were angry at Isaura, but Lúcia married a doctor and was happy with him.
- Henriette Morineau as Madeleine Besançon, a famous French actress who stages Racine's Phoedra in Rio. Gets to know Isaura and asks her if she wants to escape from Brazil with her help.

== Soundtrack ==
An EP containing the original soundtrack of the telenovela was released in 1976 by Som Livre. It contained the following tracks:

1. "Prisioneira" – Elizeth Cardoso (Isaura's theme)
2. "Amor Sem Medo" – Francis Hime (Álvaro's theme)
3. "Retirantes" – Dorival Caymmi (opening theme)
4. "Nanã" – Orquestra Som Livre
5. "Banzo" – Os Tincoãs
6. "Mãe Preta" – Coral Som Livre

== Background ==
Bernardo Guimarães wrote his novel during Brazilian's Second reign, when slavery was the main engine of the economy. Slavery's end was one of the main debates at that time. Women had not the same rights as men. Many of them found in fiction books a scape from sexism and patriarchy in real life.

Brazilian racial classification system, differently from the American one, takes into account only the skin color, not the ethnic background. However, children of slaves were considered slaves by Law. Then, Isaura finds herself in this situation: she is White as Rio de Janeiro's high society, but is threatened as a Black slave as her mother was a slave.

As a big part of novel readers were White women, Guimarães made his book's protagonist to be a white-skinned woman instead of a Black one, as readers could put themselves in the slaves' shoes and understand the unacceptable cruelty of slavery and human captivity. The book is an articulation of the author's abolitionist views. Emperor Pedro II, whose daughter Princess Isabel was responsible for the signature of Áurea law which abolished slavery in Brazil, visited Guimarães to congratulate him for the book's repercussion.

Eneida do Rego Monteiro, a Literature teacher in Colégio Dom Pedro II, Rio de Janeiro, suggested to Gilberto Braga to adapt Guimarães' novel to a soap opera. He added more characters and plots to have enough material for 100 chapters, as he concluded that being totally accurate to the book would give him material for only 30.

== Escrava Isaura around the world ==
Escrava Isaura achieved worldwide success, being broadcast in over 80 countries. According to a research conducted by Good Morning America, it is the most dubbed program in the history of world television. It was a major hit in South America, the Eastern Bloc, Portugal, Italy, Greece, Turkey, countries in Africa, Indonesia, and the People's Republic of China.

Escrava Isaura is one of the only foreign-language telenovelas aired in the United Kingdom, being broadcast on Channel 4 in 1985 as Isaura the Slave Girl. There, it started in a teatime slot on 15 April 1985 and was even coupled at times with musical highlights from Fantástico from 16 April. The run on S4C started on the same day, carrying the previous day's episode at an early afternoon timeslot. The final airing was on 24 May on Channel 4 and the following Monday (27 May) on S4C. It was also the first show broadcast dubbed into Galician when Galician-language channel TVG was launched in 1985.

It was the first telenovela broadcast in Hungary under the title Rabszolgasors ("Fate of the slaves"). It was picked up by János Horvát, a Magyar Televízió executive, who started the telenovela craze with Escrava Isaura. According to an urban legend, Hungarian viewers collected money before the happy ending of the telenovela to free Isaura. Later Lucélia Santos visited the country. After the success of the series in Hungary, other communist countries also aired the show. In 1984, it became the most popular program in the history of Polish television, achieving an 81 share. Since then, it was aired at least two other times in the country.

Lucélia Santos became the first non-Chinese leading actress of a television show broadcast in the People's Republic of China. She received the China TV Golden Eagle Award for Best Foreign Actress in 1985. The Mandarin dub was produced by Beijing Television in 1984. This dub made it to Singapore where it was broadcast by SBC's Channel 8 in 1986, where it gained an original theme song for the Singaporean broadcast, composed by Tony Song, SBC's music director. It was the first soap opera aired in the Soviet Union in 1988–1989 (reduced to 15 hour-long episodes) and in Poland in 1985. The word fazenda (farm/hacienda) jokingly became a synonym for the small land plots used for dachas. In the show, fazenda is used as a synonym for plantation.

It was broadcast in communist Albania in the 1980s, many parts of the series put together. Izaura is a famous name among babies born at that time, and so are few more names from the cast. Small FIAT police vans were for a while called "Isaura", a reference to the slave-like treatment that awaited most of those that were unlucky enough to ever be dragged into one. A running joke was that Tefta Cami, the minister of public instruction, went to the national TV station to see the last part of the series before anyone else.

Escrava Isaura was also first telenovela broadcast in the former Socialist Federal Republic of Yugoslavia. It was broadcast with unexpected success in Serbia, Slovenia and Croatia in 1988. Although the series has been extremely successful, the telenovela craze in former Yugoslavian countries did not continue until ten years later with Kassandra in 1997.

It was also broadcast in TVRI in Indonesia around 1986, and became the first ever telenovela program in Indonesian television industry.

The series was also the first telenovela broadcast in Algeria, where it aired under the title إيزورا (Isaura) dubbed to Arabic in a summer of the 1980s at 6 p.m. (AST) on RTA. It has been extremely successful in the country at that time, especially among women.

== See also ==
- List of films featuring slavery
