= Herval Rossano =

Brazilian actor (1935–2007)

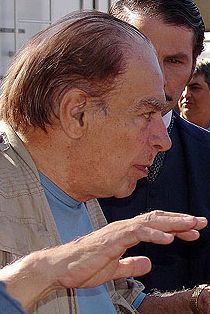
- Born: Herval Abreu Pais; April 23, 1935; Campos dos Goytacazes, Rio de Janeiro, Brazil
- Died: May 8, 2007 (aged 72); São Paulo, Brazil
- Occupation: Actor • Director

Herval Abreu Pais (April 23, 1935 – May 8, 2007), better known by his stage name Herval Rossano, was a Brazilian TV actor and director from Campos dos Goytacazes. He directed both the original 1976 version and the 2004 remake of Isaura the Slave.

He was a cinema actor and his first movie was Luzes nas Sombras in 1952, in which he played a very small role. Despite the small roles in movies and of the little payment he received for them, he participated in two productions every year. Soon he became part of the permanent cast of Multifilmes, becoming the leading man in Eva Wilma, and working with Procópio Ferreira and Maria Vidal.

== Filmography ==
=== As actor ===
Cinema

- 1952: Luzes nas sombras
- 1952: Destino
- 1953: O homem dos papagaios
- 1953: O craque - Dr. Mário
- 1953: Balança mas não cai
- 1954: A sogra
- 1959: Maria 38 - Henrique
- 1959: Titio não é sopa - Paulo
- 1959: Eu sou o tal
- 1959: Dona Xepa
- 1959: Trágica mentira
- 1960: A Viúva Valentina - Mário
- 1961: Samba em Brasília - Valdo
- 1962: Assassinato em Copacabana - Germano
- 1962: Quiero morir en carnaval
- 1962: Três colegas de batina - Aloisio
- 1963: Sonhando com Milhões - Gervásio
- 1963: Quero essa mulher assim mesmo
- 1965: No tempo dos bravos
- 1975: O casal - Doctor
- 1975: Amantes, amanhã se houver sol

TV

- 1968: El litre
- 1970: Pigmalião 70 - Fábio
- 1970: Assim na Terra como no Céu - Otto
- 1973-1974: Carinhoso - Santiago
- 1974: A Cartomante
- 1974: Fogo sobre Terra - Artur Braga
- 1975: Cuca Legal - Fausto
- 1975: Na Roda Viva da Vida
- 1977: À Sombra dos Laranjais - Pedro Lemos
- 1980: As Três Marias
- 1984: Padre Cícero - Adolfo
- 1985: A Gata Comeu
- 1986: Dona Beija
- 1987: Bambolê - Antenor
- 1989: República
- 1991: Salomé
- 1997: A Justiceira (Episode: Balas perdidas) - Armando Sien Fuegos
- 1998: Era uma Vez... - Jorge (final appearance)

=== As director ===
- 1958: Uma produção musical de Herval Rossano
- 1959: Grande teatro leões
- 1963: Praça onze (TV Rio)
- - Teleteatro de los lunes UCTV
- - Antologia del cuento (153 episodes)
- - Teatro del cuento Calaf
- 1966: Esta mujer eres tú
- 1967: Los dias jóvenes
- 1968: Altitud 3200 metros
- 1975: Helena
- 1975: O noviço
- 1975: Senhora
- 1975: A Moreninha
- 1976: Vejo a lua no céu
- 1976: O Feijão e o Sonho
- 1976: Escrava Isaura
- 1977: À Sombra dos Laranjais
- 1977: Dona Xepa
- 1977: Sinhazinha Flô
- 1978: Maria, Maria
- 1978: A Sucessora
- 1979: Super Bronco
- 1979: Cabocla
- 1980: Marina
- 1980: Olhai os Lírios do Campo
- 1981: Ciranda de Pedra
- 1981: Terras do Sem-Fim
- 1982: La gran mentira
- 1982: Vanessa
- 1983: El juego de la vida
- 1985: A gata comeu
- 1986: Dona Beija
- 1986: Novo amor
- 1986: Tudo ou nada
- 1986: Mania de querer
- 1989: Pacto de Sangue
- 1991: Salomé
- 1991: O Portador
- 1994: Caminhos cruzados
- 1996: Quem É Você?
- 2004: A Escrava Isaura
- 2006: Cristal

Director supervisor

- Gina - 1978
- Você Decide - 1994-1998
- Brava Gente - 2001

=== As Libreto author ===
- 1975: Na roda viva da vida - Caso especial.
- 1991: O portador - mini series - with José Antonio de Souza.
