= Mário Cardoso =

Portuguese actor

Mário Manuel Cardoso de Araújo (born 24 January 1950 in Lisbon) is a Portuguese actor who specializes in films and telenovelas as well in Brazilian Portuguese-language dubbing.

== Career ==
Early in his career he also worked as a model. The first major television appearance was as Robin Hood in O Trapalhão da Floresta (1974). He won international fame in the supporting role of Henrique Fontoura in the telenovela Escrava Isaura (1976). From the late 80s, he regularly took time out from television and worked in his original profession as a psychologist.

== Selected filmography ==
TV
Year	Title	Role	Notes
1976	Escrava Isaura		
2005	Alma Gêmea		
2005	América		
2007	Sete Pecados		
2008	Caminhos do Coração		
