= Lucíola =

Novel by José de Alencar

Lucíola is an urban fiction novel written by the Brazilian writer José de Alencar. It was first published in 1862. It treats mainly of the late-nineteenth century Rio de Janeiro society, exploring its deficient morality. This novel is said to be influenced by Alexandre Dumas' novel The Lady of the Camellias.
