= Diva (Alencar novel) =

Novel by José de Alencar

Diva is a novel written by the Brazilian writer José de Alencar. It was first published in 1864.

Emilia is a rich and cultured girl that, with a hint of cruelty, enjoys the courtship of young men, but makes them suffer for that. In this love story between Augusto and the divine - but fatal - Emilia, the world of conventions and human relationships is portrayed as based on convenience.

There is strong evidence that the society girl Francisca Vale Calmon Nogueira da Gama was the model for Emilia, the almost-unattainable diva in Jose Alencar's third work of fiction. He courted the girl, but being rejected during a waltz, left the halls to never bespeak Francisca again. She ended up travelling to Europe and marrying a nobleman. As a result, in 1864, it came to light another of his reflections on the female personality. And, in the novel, Alencar immortalized his lost love's black eyes. Emilia is a rich girl, well-educated and aware of her seducing powers. Likes to win the boys and then reject them. Augustus, the narrator, is one of them.
