= Bernardo Guimarães =

Brazilian poet and novelist (1825–1884)

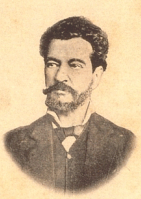
- Born: Bernardo Joaquim da Silva Guimarães; 15 August 1825; Ouro Preto, Minas Gerais, Brazil
- Died: 10 March 1884 (aged 58); Ouro Preto, Minas Gerais, Brazil
- Education: University of São Paulo
- Occupations: Poet, novelist
- Spouse: Teresa Maria Gomes de Lima
- Writing career
- Notable works: A Escrava Isaura, O Seminarista, O Garimpeiro
- Movement: Romanticism

Bernardo Joaquim da Silva Guimarães (Portuguese pronunciation: [beʁˈnaʁdu ɡimaˈɾɐ̃js]; August 15, 1825 – March 10, 1884) was a Brazilian poet and novelist. He is the author of the famous romances A Escrava Isaura and O Seminarista. He also introduced to Brazilian poetry the verso bestialógico (Portuguese: [ˈvɛʁsu beʃtʃjaˈlɔʒiku], roughly silly verse), also referred to as pantagruélico (in a reference to Rabelais's character Pantagruel) — poems whose verses are very nonsensical, although very metrical. Under the verso bestialógico, he wrote polemical erotic verses, such as "O Elixir do Pajé" (The Witchdoctor's Elixir) and "A Origem do Mênstruo" (The Origin of Menstruation). A non-erotic poem written in verso bestialógico is "Eu Vi dos Polos o Gigante Alado" (From the Poles I Saw the Winged Giant).

He is patron of the fifth chair of the Brazilian Academy of Letters.

== Biography ==
Bernardo Joaquim da Silva Guimarães was born in the city of Ouro Preto, in Minas Gerais, to João Joaquim da Silva Guimarães (a poet) and Constança Beatriz de Oliveira Guimarães.

He graduated himself at the Faculdade de Direito da Universidade de São Paulo in 1847, where he befriended the poets Álvares de Azevedo and Aureliano Lessa. With those and others, he founded the "Sociedade Epicureia" ("Epicurean Society") in the same year, and also planned with them an unsuccessful collection of poetry called As Três Liras (in English: The Three Lyres).

In 1852, he became a judge in the city of Catalão, Goiás, a post he held until 1854. He moved to Rio de Janeiro in 1858, and, in the following year, worked as a literary critic in the newspaper Atualidade. He returned to his duty of judge of Catalão in 1861, but returned once again to Rio de Janeiro in 1864. In 1866, he became teacher of Rhetoric and Poetics in Ouro Preto. He got married in 1867. In 1873, he became teacher of Latin and French in the city of Queluz (now known as Conselheiro Lafaiete), in Minas Gerais. He is honored by the Brazilian monarch Pedro II in 1881. Bernardo died poor, in Ouro Preto, in 1884.

Some of his most famous descendants were José Armelim Bernardo Guimarães and Alphonsus de Guimaraens.

== Works ==
- Cantos da Solidão (Solitude Songs — 1852)
- O Ermitão de Muquém (The Hermit of Muquém — 1868)
- Lendas e Romances (Legends and Romances — 1871)
- O Garimpeiro (The Prospector — 1872)
- Histórias da Província de Minas Gerais (Stories from the Minas Gerais Province — 1872)
- O Seminarista (The Seminarist — 1872)
- O Índio Afonso (Afonso the Indian — 1873)
- A Morte de Gonçalves Dias (Gonçalves Dias' Death — 1873)
- A Escrava Isaura (Isaura the Slave — 1875)
- Novas Poesias (New Poems — 1876)
- Maurício, ou; Os Paulistas em São João Del-Rei (Maurício, or; The Paulistas in São João Del-Rei — 1877)
- A Ilha Maldita (The Damned Island — 1879)
- O Pão de Ouro (The Golden Bread — 1879)
- Rosaura, a Enjeitada (The Neglected Rosaura — 1883)
- Folhas de Outono (Autumn Leaves — 1883)
- O Bandido do Rio das Mortes (The Bandit of the Death River — 1904, posthumous)

Preceded by New creation	Brazilian Academy of Letters - Patron of the 5th chair	Succeeded by Raimundo Correia (founder)
