= Beatriz Lyra =

Brazilian actress

- Born: Beatriz Alcina de Lyra Andrade; May 2, 1933; Canhotinho, Pernambuco, Brazil
- Other names: Beatriz Lyra
- Occupation(s): Actress (television, film, theatre)
- Years active: 1952–2016
- Notable work: Ester in Escrava Isaura; Virgínia in Novo Amor

Beatriz Alcina de Lyra Andrade (born May 2, 1933) is a Brazilian actress.

== Biography ==
=== Early years ===
Beatriz Lyra was born in Canhotinho, a small town in the Pernambuco's interior. She moved to Rio de Janeiro to pursue her acting career. She began her career at the Teatro Experimental da Ópera de Pascoal, directed by Pascoal Carlos Magno, in Rio de Janeiro’s Santa Teresa neighborhood.

=== Career ===
She made her debuted in 1969 in the soap opera A Ponte dos Suspiros written by Dias Gomes, on TV Globo. Two years later, she appeared in her first film Lua de Mel e Amendoim, directed by Fernando de Barros and Pedro Carlos Rovai. Since then, she acted in several soap operas, most notably in Escrava Isaura, playing the sick and lonely Ester, the owner of the slave Isaura.

Beatriz Lyra took on other memorable roles for TV Globo, including the noble Anita in Marina, the widowed Letícia in Baila Comigo, the humorous Irene Rock in Sol de Verão, the villainous socialite Helena in Amor com Amor Se Paga and, the sweet Almerinda in O Dono do Mundo.

Beatriz Lyra appeared in almost all the soap operas written by Manoel Carlos, her long-time friend and a key figure in his work, including roles in, Baila Comigo, Sol de Verão, Novo Amor on Rede Manchete, Felicidade, História de Amor, Por Amor and Laços de Família, as well as a role in Mulheres Apaixonadas. Manoel Carlos revealed in interviews that some actors work as a kind of 'lucky charm' in his telenovelas. To ensure a large audience for his soap operas, Manoel Carlos often casts three actors: Beatriz Lyra, Marly Bueno, and Umberto Magnani.

Her last recurring role in a soap opera was in 2000 in Laços de Família, playing Cleide, friend of the sophisticated Alma, played by Marieta Severo). Since then, she played only minor roles: Marta's friend in Mulheres Apaixonadas, Haydé in Senhora do Destino, a mother in O Profeta, and a nurse in Haja Coração.

== Filmography ==
=== Television ===
Ano	Título	Personagem	Notas
1969	A Ponte dos Suspiros	Beatriz D´ Ávila	Special participation
1975	A Moreninha	Luiza	
1976	Escrava Isaura	Ester Almeida	
1977	À Sombra dos Laranjais	Marta Caldas	
1978	Ciranda Cirandinha	Marta	
1980	Marina	Anita	
1981	Baila Comigo	Letícia Maia Rodrigues	
1981	Brilhante	Carmem	
1982	Elas por Elas	Márcia's friend	Special participation
1982	Sol de Verão	Irene Kock	
1983	Guerra dos Sexos	Gertrudes	
1983	Caso Especial	Anita	Episode: "Domingo em Família"
1984	Amor com Amor Se Paga	Helena	
1985	Ti Ti Ti	Samantha	Special participation
1986	Novo Amor	Virgínia Monteiro	
1987	Mandala	Estela	
1988	Bebê a Bordo	Dra. Silvia	
1990	Barriga de Aluguel	Social worker	Special participation
1990	Rainha da Sucata	Olga	Special participation
1990	Araponga	Neusa	Special participation
1991	Felicidade	Idalina	
1991	O Dono do Mundo	Almerinda	
1992	Você Decide	—	Episode: Águas Passadas
1994	Você Decide	—	Episode: Flor de Outono
1995	História de Amor	Silvana Furtado	
1996	Você Decide	Diana	Episode: "Véu de Noiva"
1997	Por Amor	Mafalda Andrade	
1999	Você Decide	Dirce	Episode: "Ninguém é Perfeito"
1999	Mulher	Neide	Episode: "O Acidente"
2000	Laços de Família	Cleide	
2003	Mulheres Apaixonadas	Marta's friend	Special participation
2004	Senhora do Destino	Nurse	Special participation
2007	O Profeta	Mother Superior	Special participation
2016	Haja Coração	Dionice	Special participation

=== Cinema ===
Ano	Título	Personagem
1971	Lua de Mel e Amendoim	Serginho's mother
1977	Esse Rio Muito Louco	—
1978	J.J.J., O Amigo do Super-Homem	Owner of the emerald

=== Theatre ===
Year	Title	Theatre	Ref.
1967	Nicolette Contra 009	Cine Pax, Ipanema, Rio de Janeiro	
1967	O Gol de Tia Candoca	Teatro Casagrande, Ipanema, Rio de Janeiro	
1968	Luz de Gás	Teatro Dulcina de Moraes, Centro, Rio de Janeiro	
1969	Chantagem	Teatro Mesbla, Centro, Rio de Janeiro	
1969	Antigone	Teatro Opinião, Centro, Rio de Janeiro	
1970	A Teia da Aranha	Teatro Mesbla, Centro, Rio de Janeiro	
1971	Senhorita Julia	Recife, Pernambuco	
1971	Um Vizinho em Nossas Vidas	Teatro Glaucio Gill, Copacabana, Rio de Janeiro	
1972	Via Crúcis ou a Humanidade de Cristo	Igreja Santa Margarida, Gávea, Rio de Janeiro	
1973	Crimeterapia	Teatro Glória, Glória, Rio de Janeiro	
1974	Chiquinha Gonzaga	Teatro Dulcina de Moraes, Centro, Rio de Janeiro	
1975	Bonifácio Bilhões	Teatro da Praia, Copacabana, Rio de Janeiro	
1975	A Venerável Madame Goneau	Teatro Mesbla, Centro, Rio de Janeiro	
1977	Divórcio, Cupim da Sociedade	Teatro Casagrande, Ipanema, Rio de Janeiro	
1979	Como Testar a Fidelidade das Mulheres (production assistant)	Teatro Copacabana, Copacabana, Rio de Janeiro	
1980	Campeões do Mundo	Teatro Villa-Lobos, Copacabana, Rio de Janeiro	
1983	Caixa de Sombras	Funarte, Rio de Janeiro	
1988	O Preço	Teatro Copacabana, Copacabana, Rio de Janeiro	
1996	A Dama do Cerrado	Teatro Leblon, Leblon, Rio de Janeiro	
2000	Jornada de Um Poema	Teatro FAAP, Higienopolis, São Paulo	

== Personal life ==
Unmarried and without children, she lives in Catete neighborhood of Rio de Janeiro with her niece.
