= Véu de Noiva =

Brazilian telenovela

- Genre: Telenovela
- Created by: Janete Clair
- Directed by: Daniel Filho
- Starring: Regina Duarte; Cláudio Marzo; Betty Faria; Myriam Pérsia; Geraldo Del Rey
- Country of origin: Brazil
- Original language: Portuguese
- No. of episodes: 221

Original release
- Network: TV Globo
- Release: 14 October 1969 – 6 June 1970

Related
- Rosa Rebelde; Irmãos Coragem

Véu de Noiva is a Brazilian telenovela produced and broadcast by TV Globo. It premiered on ,"RJ" October 14, 1969 to June 6, and "SP" 1970 10 November 1969 and ended on 18 July 1970, with a total of 221 episodes in black and white. It's the eight "novela das oito" to be aired on the timeslot. It was created and written by Janete Clair, and directed by Daniel Filho.

== Cast ==
- Regina Duarte - Andréa / Roberta / Maria Célia
- Cláudio Marzo - Marcelo Montserrat
- Myriam Pérsia - Flor
- Geraldo Del Rey - Luciano
- Betty Faria - Irene
- Cláudio Cavalcanti - Renato Madeira
- Márcia Rodrigues - Tatiane
- José Augusto Branco - Sérgio
- Ênio Santos - Eugênio
- Glauce Rocha - Helena
- Paulo José - Zé Mário
- Carlos Eduardo Dolabella - Armando
- Djenane Machado - Maria Eduarda
- Gilberto Martinho - Felício
- Ana Ariel - Rosa
- Neuza Amaral - Lurdes
- Álvaro Aguiar - Dr. Albertini
- Oswaldo Loureiro - Chico
- Suzana Faini - Dulce
- Emiliano Queiroz - Tomaz
- Suzana de Moraes - Suzana
- Darlene Glória - Leda
- Miriam Pires - Mariana
- Zilka Salaberry - Tia Cora
- Lourdinha Bittencourt - Olga
- Mary Daniel - Mariana
- Paulo Gonçalves - Seu Lorena
- Jorge Cherques - Wilson
- Júlio César - Antônio Lopes
