= Por Amor (1997 TV series) =

Brazilian telenovela

- Genre: Telenovela; Family drama; Slice of life
- Created by: Manoel Carlos
- Written by: Manoel Carlos; Maria Carolina; Vinícius Vianna; Letícia Dornelles
- Directed by: Alexandre Avancini; Ary Coslov; Roberto Naar; Edson Spinello; Paulo Ubiratan; Ricardo Waddington
- Starring: Regina Duarte; Gabriela Duarte; Antônio Fagundes; Fábio Assunção
- Opening theme: "Falando de Amor" by Quarteto em Cy & MPB4, "Per Amore" by Zizi Possi
- Composer: Alberto Rosenblit
- Country of origin: Brazil
- Original language: Portuguese
- No. of episodes: 191

Production
- Producer: Ruy Mattos
- Production locations: Rio de Janeiro; Venice
- Cinematography: Chico Boya; Carlos Botelho
- Editors: César Chaves; Aníbal Veiga; Rosimeire Barros
- Camera setup: Multi-camera
- Running time: 35–63 minutes
- Production company: Central Globo de Produção

Original release
- Network: Rede Globo
- Release: 13 October 1997 – 23 May 1998

Por Amor (English: Anything For Love) is a Brazilian telenovela created by Manoel Carlos, starring Regina Duarte and Gabriela Duarte in the main roles. It replaced A Indomada and preceded Torre de Babel, and was the 55th telenovela to be aired by Rede Globo.

== Production ==
"What would you be able to do for love?" it was the motto of the advertising campaign for the release of the novel.

For the second time, Regina Duarte was a Helena de Manoel Carlos - the first out in História de Amor (Love History), in 1995. For the actress, even Por Amor would have been História de Amor 2 – because of the approach of the mother-daughter relationship. The actress's third Helena would come later, in Páginas da Vida (Pages of Life), in 2006. The name, used by the author in almost all of his novels since Baila Comigo (1981), has become a mark of style and gives unity to his work, creating a bond between the strong and charming "middle-class heroines" as he usually does. characterize their Helenas. Only in Sol de Verão (1982) did the author not include a Helena in his story.

Manoel Carlos tells that he wrote the synopsis of Por Amor in 1983, but, involved with other projects, postponed the plot. For this story, the author was inspired by the only love he believes to be absolutely unquestionable: the maternal.

The author says that he relied on common people and personal dramas to write the plots and characters of Por Amor. Orestes (Paulo José), for example, was born from a conversation with a friend of his. The two concluded that every family has an alcoholic, a former alcoholic or a potential alcoholic.

Director Paulo Ubiratan died during the novel on March 28, 1998. Ricardo Waddington, who already directed the plot, took over the general direction of Por Amor.

== Plot ==
Helena is the divorced mother of Maria Eduarda, a spoiled young woman, and they both live in Leblon, where most of the story happens. Helena does her best to make Eduarda accept her alcoholic father, Orestes. But Eduarda has eyes only for her great love, Marcelo. The boy suffers from a persecution of his former girlfriend, Laura, distraught at having been neglected. Marcelo's mother, Branca Leticia, also disagreed with her son's choice. Branca is a fierce and strong-willed woman, who likes to manipulate other people. Branca worships Marcelo, her eldest son, but doesn't care for her other children, the modern middle daughter Milena and the shy youngest son, Leonardo. Branca controls the life of her friend Isabel, who has an affair with Atilio, a man who is looking for a great love. Branca has long been in love with Atilio and angry to learn that he fell in love with Eduarda's mother, Helena.

After a brief romance, and to Branca's disgust, as well as Isabel's and Laura's, Helena marries Atilio and Eduarda marries Marcelo. Mother and daughter get pregnant at the same time and give birth on the same day at the hospital in Rio de Janeiro, under the care of young doctor Cesar, a man who has always been in love with Eduarda. Helena's son is born healthy, but Eduarda has complications during the birth and the baby is stillborn. To complicate the situation of the younger woman, she can never be a mother due to the loss of her uterus. Helena can not bear the suffering this will bring to her daughter, and begs Cesar do help her. She proposes that they switch the babies, and Caesar is reluctant but accedes and agrees to the exchange. So Eduarda thinks her baby brother is her son, whom she named Marcelinho, and that it was her mother's baby who died. Cesar is the only person who knows this secret besides Helena. Helena, however, suffers with the secret, and must treat her baby as a grandchild, and sees her marriage to Atilio deteriorate, despite the great love that unites them.

To cope, she writes all the events in a diary, which is eventually discovered by Eduarda. In the midst of it all, Eduarda, having been so spoiled by her mother, refuses to help her father Orestes' alcoholism, and he is taken care of by his young daughter Sandra instead. Branca despises her daughter Milena's romantic involvement with Nando, Eduarda's stepbrother via Orestes, who is a helicopter pilot. Laura pursues Marcelo and poisons him against Eduarda, with Branca's support. It is ultimately discovered that Branca thought all along that Marcelo was Atilio's son, and that is why he was her favorite child; she was wrong, however, as her youngest son Leonardo is revealed to be Atilio's son, as he and Branca had an affair for many years. Marcelo and Milena are Arnaldo's children, Branca's womanizer husband, who has an affair with Isabel afterwards.

In the end, Atilio leaves, feeling betrayed after finding out the truth about his and Helena's baby. Laura, who gets pregnant by Marcelo, goes on a helicopter flight with Nando, and the two suffer an accident. Only Nando is found alive, and Marcelo and Eduarda reconcile, deciding to raise Laura's twins. Atilio ultimately comes back and gets back together with Helena. The last scene shows Marcelinho walking his first steps from Eduarda and Marcelo to Helena and Atilio, in the Rio de Janeiro Botanical Garden.

== Cast ==
Actor	Character
Regina Duarte	Helena Viana
Gabriela Duarte	Maria Eduarda Viana Greco
Antônio Fagundes	Atílio Novelli
Fábio Assunção	Marcelo de Barros Mota
Susana Vieira	Branca Letícia de Barros Mota
Vivianne Pasmanter	Laura Saboya Trajano
Carolina Ferraz	Milena de Barros Mota
Eduardo Moscovis	Fernando "Nando" Gonzaga
Paulo José	Orestes Greco
Regina Braga	Lídia Gonzaga
Cecília Dassi	Sandra "Sandrinha" Gonzaga Greco
Murilo Benício	Leonardo "Léo" de Barros Mota
Vera Holtz	Sirléia Batalha
Marco Ricca	Nestor Pereira
Carolina Dieckmann	Catarina "Caty" Batalha Pereira
Eloísa Mafalda	Leonor Batalha
José Carlos Sanches	Fausto Ribeiro
Marcelo Serrado	Dr. César Andrade
Flávia Bonato	Dr. Anita Duarte
Françoise Forton	Margarida "Meg" Saboya Trajano
Ricardo Petraglia	Trajano
Maria Ceiça	Márcia
Maria Zilda Bethlem	Flávia
Carlos Eduardo Dolabella	Arnaldo de Barros Mota
Cássia Kiss	Isabel Lafayette
Ângela Vieira	Virgínia
Odilon Wagner	Rafael
Ângelo Paes Leme	Rodrigo
Júlia Almeida	Natália Saboya Trajano
Karina Perez	Rose
Stella Maria Rodrigues	Zilá
Larissa Queiroz	Juliana
Beatriz Lyra	Mafalda Andrade
Umberto Magnani	Antenor Andrade
Sebastião Vasconcelos	Priest at Marcelo and Maria Eduarda's wedding
Claudia Mauro	Liza
Jorge Cherques	Lourenço
Ilva Niño	Dalva

== Reception ==
=== Ratings ===
Timeslot	Episodes	Premiere		Finale		Rank	Season	Average viewership
Timeslot	Episodes	Date	Viewers (in points)	Date	Viewers (in points)	Rank	Season	Average viewership
Weeknights; 8:45pm	191	13 October 1997	48	22 May 1998	57	#1	1997-98	43
