= Duse =

Duse or Dusé may refer to:

== People ==
=== Surname ===
- Carlo Duse (1898–1956), Italian film actor
- Eleonora Duse (1858–1924), Italian actress (see also the film below)
- Eugenio Duse (1889–1969), Italian stage and film actor
- Vittorio Duse (1916–2005), Italian actor, screenwriter and film director

=== Given name ===
- Duse Nacaratti (1942–2009), Brazilian actress and comedian
- Dusé Mohamed Ali (1866–1945), Sudanese-Egyptian actor and political activist

== Other uses ==
- Duse Bay, Antarctica
- Duse (film), a 2025 biographical film about the actress Eleonora Duse
