= Miguel Thiré =

Brazilian actor (born 1982)

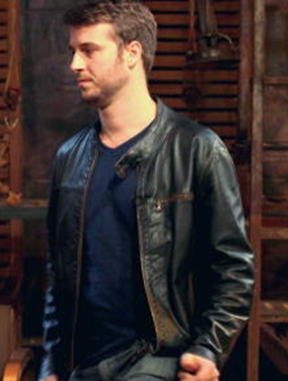
- Thiré (2015)
- Born: July 8, 1982 (age 43); Rio de Janeiro, Brazil
- Occupation: Actor
- Years active: 2000–present

Miguel Pesce Thiré (born July 8, 1982) is a Brazilian actor.

== Biography ==
Thiré was born in Rio de Janeiro, Brazil. He is the son of actor Cecil Thiré with theater producer Norma Thiré, brother of the actors Luísa Thiré and Carlos Thiré and also of the musician João Thiré, grandchildren of the actress Tônia Carrero and the artist Carlos Arthur Thiré.

He currently lives in Portugal since the beginning of the 2016 recording of the telenovela "A Impostora" on TVI, the leading audience channel in Portugal.

== Filmography ==
=== Television ===
Year	Title	Role	Notes
2000	Malhação	Jacaré	Season 7
2001	Porto dos Milagres	Alfredo Henrique	
2002	O Quinto dos Infernos	Augusto de Beauharnais	
2002	Desejos de Mulher	Diogo (young)	
2002	Malhação	Charles Junior	Season 9
2004	Sob Nova Direção	Bruno	Episode: "Seu Filho, Meu Tesouro"
2006	Cobras & Lagartos	Otaviano Pacheco (young)	
2006	Paixões Proibidas	Simão de Azevedo	
2008	Mateus, o Balconista	—N/a	
2008	Casos e Acasos	Adriano	Episode: "O Carro, o E-mail e o Rapper"
2009	Poder Paralelo	Douglas Arno (Dog)	
2011	Sansão e Dalila	Faruk	
2013	Copa Hotel	Frederico Gonzales (Fred)	
2014	Em Família	Gabriel	
2016–present	A Impostora	Lucas Accioly	

=== Film ===
Year	Title	Role
2006	Didi – O Caçador de Tesouro	Lukas Walker
2009	Vida de Balconista	Miguel
2012	A Memória Que Me Contam	Eduardo
2013	O Inventor de Sonhos	Luís Bernardo
2016	Atira-te ao Rio (Short film)	

== Stage ==
Year	Title
2000	Tango, Bolero e Chá-Chá-Chá
2003	Balada
2004	Beijo na Boca
2006	Superiores (actor, author e director)
2008	2 p/ Viagem (actor, author e director)
2008	Otelo
2011–12	Os Altruístas
2012	O que você gostaria que ficasse? (author e director)
2014–15	Selfie
2015	Os Ordinários (actor, author e director)
2016	O Cara (director)
