= Yara Amaral =

Brazilian actress

Yara da Silva Amaral
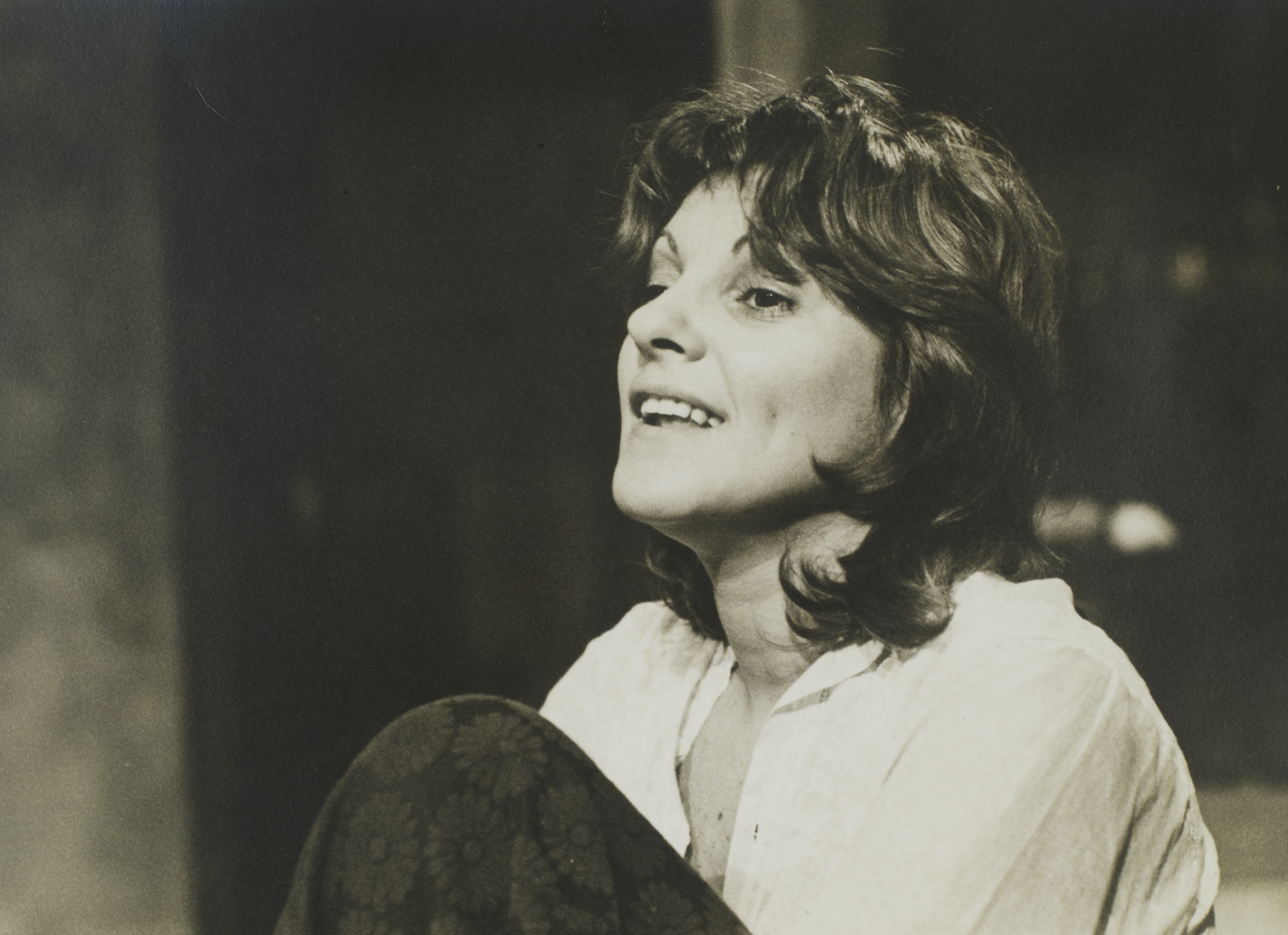
- Born: September 16, 1936; Jaboticabal
- Died: December 31, 1988 (aged 52); Rio de Janeiro
- Occupation: Actress

Yara da Silva Amaral (September 16, 1936 – December 31, 1988) was a Brazilian actress.

== Early life ==
Born to a Portuguese father and a Brazilian mother, Yara was born in the interior of São Paulo, however she grew up in the neighborhood of Belenzinho since she was one year old.

She graduated from the University of São Paulo in the Dramatic Arts department in 1964.

== Career ==
In 1968, she participated in the show Arena Conta Tiradentes by Gianfrancesco Guarnieri at the Teatro de Arena.

She also worked at the Teatro Oficina where she won her first major acting award for her role in the 1970s, a Moliére, as the best actress for her work in Réveillon, by Flávio Márcio, alongside Regina Duarte and Sérgio Mamberti.

At the theater, she participated in thirty shows and won three Moliere awards as best actress. In cinema, she debuted in 1975 with O Rei da Noite, by Héctor Babenco, and made other important films such as Lady on the Bus, Mulher Objeto, and Leila Diniz.

On television she debuted in the telenovela O Décimo Mandamento, on TV Tupi, in 1968, written by Benedito Ruy Barbosa. She started for TV Globo in the 1970s, and found fame as she starred in works such as Dancin' Days, O Amor É Nosso, Sol de Verão, Guerra dos Sexos, Um Sonho a Mais, Cambalacho, Anos Dourados, and Fera Radical.

== Personal life ==
She married the Brazilian director and producer, Luis Fernando Goulart. They had two children together, Bernardo and João Mário.

At 11:50 pm on December 31, 1988, a Saturday, the boat Bateau Mouche IV ended up sinking, resulting in Yara's death along with her mother and 54 other people on board. Despite not knowing how to swim, her cause of death was a heart attack. The artist's remains lie in the São Joāo Batista Cemetery, in the neighborhood of Botafogo, Rio de Janeiro.

== Filmography ==
=== "Telenovelas" ===
- 1968 - A Pequena Órfã - Raquel (TV Excelsior)
- 1968 - A Última Testemunha - Maria Sofredora (TV Record)
- 1968 - O Décimo Mandamento - Luzia (TV Tupi)
- 1968 - O Direito dos Filhos - Margareth (TV Excelsior)
- 1970 - E Nós, Aonde Vamos? - Leila (TV Tupi)
- 1970 - Irmãos Coragem - Tula
- 1977 - Espelho Mágico - Suzete Calmon
- 1978 - Dancin' Days - Áurea
- 1981 - O Amor É Nosso - Maria Helena
- 1982 - Sol de Verão - Sofia
- 1983 - Guerra dos Sexos - Nieta
- 1984 - Viver a Vida - Germana (Rede Manchete)
- 1985 - Um Sonho a Mais - Beatriz
- 1986 - Anos Dourados - Celeste
- 1986 - Cambalacho - Dinorah Melina Sousa e Silva
- 1987 - Helena - Dorzinha (Rede Manchete)
- 1987 - Mandala - Salma
- 1988 - Fera Radical - Joana Flores

=== Cinema ===
- 1973 - Tati
- 1975 - O Rei da Noite
- 1977 - Parada 88, o Limite de Alerta
- 1978 - Lady on the Bus
- 1978 - Nos Embalos de Ipanema
- 1980 - Mulher Objeto
- 1981 - Prova de Fogo
- 1985 - Tropclip
- 1987 - Leila Diniz
