= Espelho Mágico =

- Genre: Telenovela
- Created by: Lauro César Muniz
- Directed by: Daniel Filho; Gonzaga Blota; Marco Aurélio Bagno
- Starring: Juca de Oliveira; Glória Menezes; Tarcísio Meira; Yoná Magalhães; Lima Duarte; Sônia Braga; Mauro Mendonça; Tony Ramos; Vera Fischer; Carlos Eduardo Dolabella
- Opening theme: "Vai Levando" by Tom Jobim and Miúcha
- Country of origin: Brazil
- Original language: Portuguese
- No. of episodes: 150

Production
- Running time: 50 minutes
- Production company: Sistema Globo de Novelas

Original release
- Network: Rede Globo
- Release: 14 June – 5 December 1977

Espelho Mágico (The Magic Mirror) is a Brazilian telenovela produced and broadcast by Rede Globo. It premiered on 14 June 1977 and ended on 5 December 1977, with a total of 150 episodes. It's the nineteenth "novela das oito" to be aired on the timeslot. It is created and written by Lauro César Muniz and directed by Daniel Filho, Gonzaga Blota and Marco Aurélio Bagno.

== Plot ==
The soap opera talks about the daily lives, successes, and conflicts of media professionals: actors, directors, writers, and journalists. The stories are told through the behind-the-scenes of Coquetel de Amor, a soap opera within the plot.

Diogo Maia and Leila Lombardi are the main couple in the story. Famous for their work on television, the two are cast to star in Coquetel de Amor, written by Jordão Amaral and directed by João Gabriel. Jordão is an unknown playwright who also works as a journalist to supplement his income. In love with Leila Lombardi, he declares his love for the actress through the text he writes for her character in Coquetel de Amor.

However, Jordão is married to Norma Pelegrine, a veteran actress who has spent years away from television. Accustomed to being the protagonist, Norma returns to work in Coquetel de Amor, but playing a supporting character. And the situation makes her very unhappy.

While these individuals are already established in life, there are figures who are attempting to change their career paths, such as Cynthia Levy, an ambitious actress willing to climb the social ladder, or former pornographic actress Diana Queiroz, who was seeking new directions for her career. Also in this milieu are Nestor Rey, who came from the countryside to try his luck in Rio de Janeiro; and Paulo Morel, who is called in at the last minute to replace one of the protagonists in Cyrano de Bergerac, adapted by Gastão Cortez and starring Diogo Maia.

=== Coquetel de Amor's plot ===
The love between Ciro (Diogo Maia) and Rosana (Leila Lombardi) is threatened by the presence of the beautiful Débora (Diana Queiroz), who returns from Europe on the day the couple celebrates their wedding anniversary. To make Ciro jealous, Rosana gets close to tennis player Roberto (Newton Viana), causing her husband's anger. But Roberto was more interested in the young Camila (Cynthia Levy), his fiancée. Meanwhile, Débora demands that Ciro reveal his mother's identity. The young woman has no idea that she is very close: it is Assunta (Nora Pelegrini), the housekeeper at Ciro's house.

Ciro is a composer who was once famous and devises a mysterious plan involving Rosana. On a trip, Ciro's yacht is sabotaged and explodes at sea, but earlier than planned. Ciro is presumed dead, but he survives: he ends up on a deserted beach and is taken in by a family of fishermen. Ciro's associates, even though they believe he is dead, continue with the plan, introducing the young Cristiano (Paulo Morel) into Ciro's family, hired to be the composer's front man. But Ciro contacts Benito to find out who betrayed him. Meanwhile, Cristiano becomes involved with Rosana.

== Cast ==
- Juca de Oliveira - Jordão Amaral (author of Coquetel de Amor) (meaning Cocktail of Love)
- Tarcísio Meira - Diogo Maia (Ciro in Coquetel de Amor)
- Glória Menezes - Leila Lombardi (Rosana in Coquetel de Amor)
- Mauro Mendonça - Nelson Novaes
- Sônia Braga - Cínthia Levy (Camila in Coquetel de Amor)
- Tony Ramos - Paulo Morel (Cristiano in Coquetel de Amor)
- Vera Fischer - Diana Queiroz (Débora in Coquetel de Amor)
- Carlos Eduardo Dolabella - Edgar Rabello
- Milton Moraes - Vicente Drummond
- Pepita Rodrigues - Bruna Maria Novaes (Kátia in Coquetel de Amor)
- Lídia Brondi - Beatriz Lombardi Amaral
- Jorge Cherques - Alfredo Barbosa
- Kito Junqueira - Nestor Rey
- Heloísa Millet - Luiza Barbosa
- Djenane Machado - Lenita (Neide in Coquetel de Amor)
- Jorge Botelho - Jorge Maya (Eduardo in Coquetel de Amor)
- Maria Lúcia Dahl - Lúcia Mendes (Paula in Coquetel de Amor)
- Nélson Caruso - Newton Viana (Roberto in Coquetel de Amor)
- Yara Amaral - Suzete Calmon (Ernestina in Coquetel de Amor)
- Daniel Filho - João Gabriel (director in Coquetel de Amor)
- Lima Duarte - Carijó
- Yoná Magalhães - Nora Pellegrine (Assunta in Coquetel de Amor)
- Sérgio Britto - Gastão Cortez (Benito in Coquetel de Amor)
- Walter D'Ávila
