= Romeo and Juliet Get Married =

2005 film directed by Bruno Barreto

- Original film poster
- Portuguese: O Casamento de Romeu e Julieta
- Directed by: Bruno Barreto
- Written by: Marcos Caruso; Jandira Martini
- Produced by: Paula Barreto
- Starring: Luana Piovani; Marco Ricca; Luís Gustavo; Martha Mellinger; Berta Zemmel; Mel Lisboa; Leonardo Miggiorin
- Music by: Guto Graça Mello
- Production company: Globo Filmes
- Distributed by: Buena Vista International
- Release date: 18 March 2005
- Running time: 93 minutes
- Country: Brazil
- Language: Portuguese

Romeo and Juliet Get Married (Portuguese: O Casamento de Romeu e Julieta; lit. 'The marriage of Romeo and Juliet') is a 2005 Brazilian film directed by Bruno Barreto and starring Luana Piovani and Marco Ricca. The film is loosely based on the William Shakespeare play, Romeo and Juliet, set in São Paulo amid two feuding soccer clubs, Palmeiras and Corinthians.

== Plot ==
The film takes place in 1999. The tomboyish, outgoing Julieta is the daughter of a member of the Palmeiras soccer club board. She is constantly frustrated by what she sees as institutional bias against women in soccer. One day while watching her beloved Palmeiras, she is struck by a handsome man, Romeu, whom she sees rooting for the Palmeiras' chief rivals, the Corinthians. After meeting the same man again in the middle of an eye exam, Julieta and Romeu quickly become a couple. However, in order to avoid incurring the wrath of her parents, Romeu is forced to pretend to be an adoring Palmeiras fan, an increasingly difficult task for the die-hard Corinthiano.

Finally, Romeu is forced to admit his true allegiance to Julieta's father on a turbulent plane flight following the Palmeiras' disastrous defeat in an international match in Tokyo (the 1999 Intercontinental Cup). Romeu and Julieta are shunned by both members of their family, including Romeu's spry grandmother. Eventually the two families face off in a heated confrontation outside Romeu's apartment, an argument that is escalated particularly after it is revealed that Julieta is pregnant.

Eventually, the two feuding families are able to rally around their love for both Romeu and Julieta, even if they are unable to look past their different sport affiliations.
