= Carlos Kroeber =

Brazilian actor

Carlos Henrique Kroeber
- Born: 20 September 1934; Belo Horizonte, MG, Brazil
- Died: 12 June 1999; Rio de Janeiro, RJ, Brazil
- Years active: 1968–1998

Carlos Henrique Kroeber (1934–1999) was a Brazilian film and television actor.

== Filmography ==
=== Movies ===
| Year | Film | Role | Notes | Ref |
|---|---|---|---|---|
| 1968 | O Homem que Comprou o Mundo | | | |
| 1969 | Navalha na Carne | | | |
| 1970 | É Simonal | | | |
| 1971 | A Casa Assassinada | Timóteo | | |
| 1971 | Rua Descalça | | | |
| 1972 | Os Inconfidentes | Alvarenga Peixoto | | |
| 1972 | Som Amor e Curtição | | | |
| 1973 | Os Primeiros Momentos | | | |
| 1973 | Joanna Francesa | Aureliano | | |
| 1974 | Um Homem Célebre | | | |
| 1974 | O Marginal | Marcito | | |
| 1974 | Motel | | | |
| 1974 | O Filho do Chefão | | | |
| 1974 | Guerra Conjugal | João Bicha | | |
| 1975 | Quem Tem Medo de Lobisomem? | Leão | | |
| 1975 | O Casamento | Padre Bernardo | | |
| 1975 | O Padre que Queria Pecar | | | |
| 1975 | As Loucuras de um Sedutor | | | |
| 1975 | A Extorsão | Machado | | |
| 1976 | Um Brasileiro Chamado Rosaflor | | | |
| 1976 | Tem Alguém na Minha Cama | | | |
| 1976 | Soledade, a Bagaceira | | | |
| 1976 | Gordos e Magros | Carlão / Carlinhos | | |
| 1976 | Feminino plural | | | |
| 1977 | Gente Fina É Outra Coisa | | | |
| 1977 | Anchieta, José do Brasil | | | |
| 1978 | O bandido Antonio Do | | | |
| 1979 | Muito Prazer | | | |
| 1979 | Massacre em Caxias | | | |
| 1980 | Bye Bye Brazil | Caminhoneiro | | |
| 1981 | Bonitinha mas Ordinária | Dr. Werneck | | |
| 1982 | Luz del Fuego | Trancoso | | |
| 1982 | Tessa, a Gata | Raul | | |
| 1984 | Quilombo | Tourinho | | |
| 1984 | Noites do Sertão | Sô Liodoro | | |
| 1984 | O Cavalinho Azul | Gigante | | |
| 1985 | Chico Rei | Governador | | |
| 1986 | Vera | Director of the Institution | | |
| 1986 | Por Incrível que Pareça | | | |
| 1987 | Running Out of Luck | | | |
| 1988 | Jardim de Alah | | | |
| 1989 | Minas-Texas | Dr. Rodrigo | | |
| 1990 | The 5th Monkey | Mr. Garcia | | |

=== Television ===
| Year | Shoe | Role | Notes | Ref |
|---|---|---|---|---|
| 1976 | Estúpido Cupido | Frei Damasceno | | |
| 1978 | O pulo do gato | Pacheco | | |
| 1979 | Pai Herói | Tiago | | |
| 1980 | As três Marias | Olímpio | | |
| 1981 | Baila Comigo | Gerente de banco | | |
| 1981 | Terras do sem fim | Sinhô Badaró | | |
| 1982 | Sétimo Sentido | Antônio Rivoredo | | |
| 1982 | Sol de Verão | Hilário | | |
| 1983 | Guerra dos Sexos | Moisés | | |
| 1984 | Transas e caretas | Dom Manuel | | |
| 1984 | Amor com Amor Se Paga | Anselmo | | |
| 1985 | Um Sonho a Mais | Pedro Ernesto | | |
| 1985 | O Tempo e o Vento | Nepomuceno | | |
| 1986 | Roda de Fogo | Werner Benson | | |
| 1986 | Cambalacho | Delegado | | |
| 1987 | Mandala | Dr. Henrique | | |
| 1988 | Fera Radical | Dr. Nogueira | | |
| 1989 | Que Rei Sou Eu? | Dom Curro de la Grana | | |
| 1989 | O Sexo dos Anjos | Nascimento | | |
| 1989 | República | Dom Pedro II | | |
| 1990 | Barriga de Aluguel | Ramiro | | |
| 1990 | Rainha da Sucata | Conde Giacomo di Lampedusa | | |
| 1992 | Perigosas Peruas | Michelângelo | | |
| 1992 | Deus nos acuda | Alberto | | |
| 1992 | Glückliche Reise | | | |
| 1993 | Sonho Meu | Varela | | |
| 1994 | Pátria Minha | Cristiano | | |
| 1994 | A Viagem | Juiz | | |
| 1995 | História de Amor | Remador | | |
| 1995 | Engraçadinha... seus amores e seus pecados | | | |
| 1997 | Anjo Mau | Conrado Medeiros | | |
| 1998 | Torre de Babel | Dr. Navarro | | |
| 1998 | Labirinto | Juiz | | |
