= Bia Nunnes =

Brazilian actress

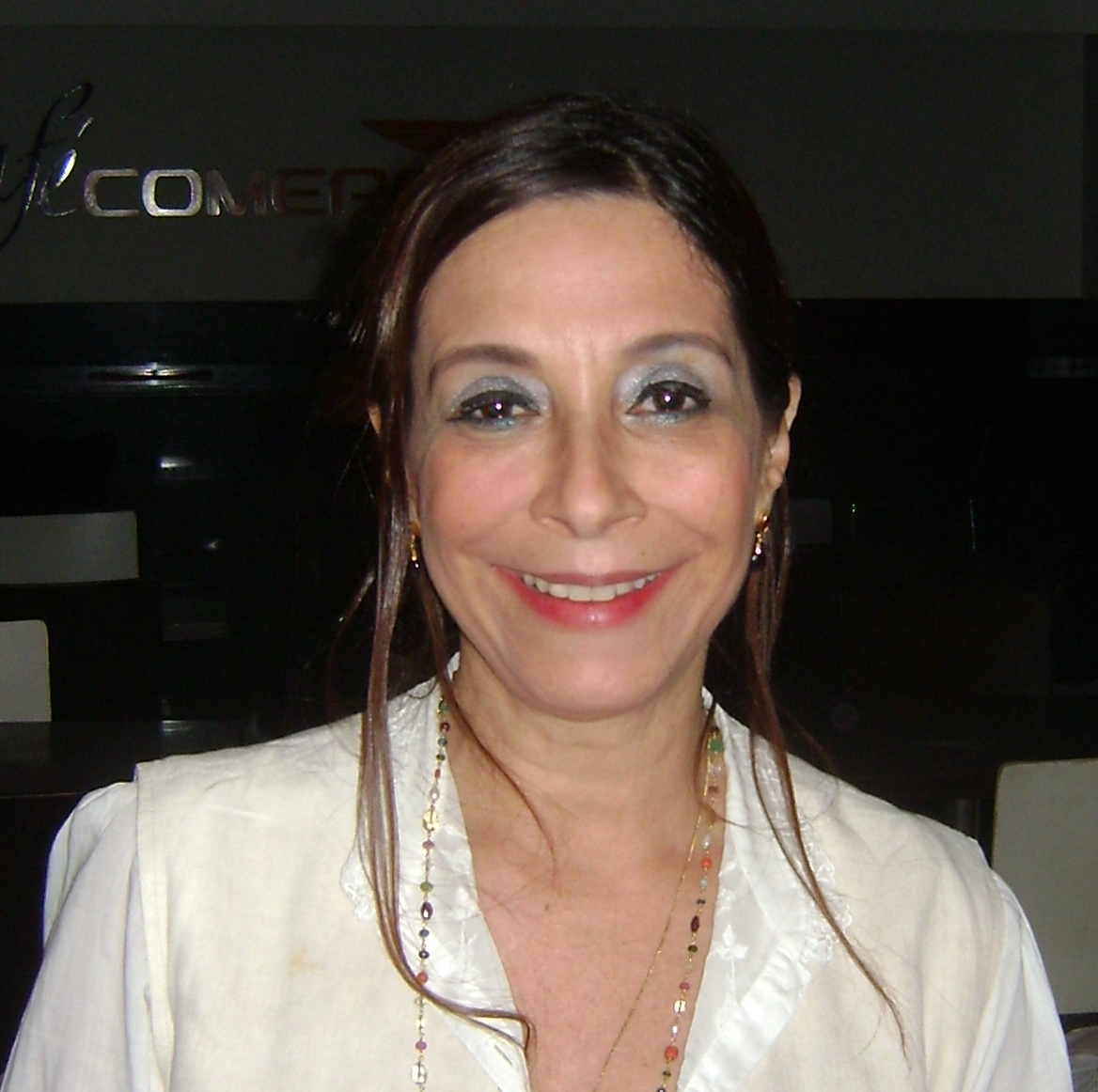
- Bia Nunnes in April 2011.
- Born: Beatriz Alexim Nunes; April 4, 1958 (age 67); Rio de Janeiro, Brazil
- Occupation: Actress
- Spouse: Fernando Berditchevsky (m. 1982)
- Parent: Max Nunes
- Relatives: Maria Cristina Nunes (sister)

Beatriz Alexim Nunes (born April 4, 1958 in Rio de Janeiro, Brazil) better known as Bia Nunnes, is a Brazilian actress. She is the sister of actress Maria Cristina Nunes and daughter of the writer and humorist Max Nunes. She has been married to Fernando Berditchevsky since 1982.

== Career ==
Owner of a very personal style of humor, Bia Nunnes became widely known for his comic turns in the program as the Viva o Gordo, Jô Soares in the success of Rede Globo in the early 1980s. In that same decade, debuted as the protagonist in the novel Amor com Amor Se Paga, Ivani Ribeiro in 1984.

Partner Miguel Falabella, she was featured on the first novel signed by him and Maria Carmen Barbosa in 1996, Salsa e Merengue.

The actress also developed career in the theater, emphasizing, among others, the play The Vagina Monologues. On stage he has worked with Marília Pêra, Marco Nanini, Miguel Falabella, Jorge Fernando, Wolf Maya and Aderbal Freire Jr, among other prestigious names in the panorama of the Brazilian theater.

Bia debuted in film in the film O Cavalinho Azul, Eduardo Escorel in 1984. The following year was cast by Júlio Bressane the beautiful Brás Cubas, a very personal vision of the filmmaker on the classic character of Machado de Assis. Bia fit like a glove in the proposed scenic and aesthetic Júlio Bressane and ended up working in three major films of the filmmaker: Sermões - A História de Antônio Vieira, Miramar and São Jerônimo.

In 2009, the actress shows up in Portugal with the number Humor a Vapor, which is also producing. This is a comedy that also shows the influence of the Portuguese theater and magazine in Brazil since the past decades. During the 75 minutes of play, Bia Nunnes shares the stage with Beto Coville, actor and director who works in Brazil and Portugal, where he has lived for 16 years, couples playing in unusual situations. Directed by director Fernando Berditchevsky, Bia Nunnes who is married since 1982. Humor a Vapor is based on texts and music of humorists Artur Azevedo, Max Nunes and Luis Fernando Verissimo, with the final text of the authorship of the actress and director of the show.

In 2011, Bia Nunnes is playing with the play Igual a Você, alongside Camila Morgado and Anderson Müller. That same year, is cast in the soap opera Aquele Beijo of Miguel Falabella.

== Filmography ==
=== Television ===
Year	Title	Role	Notes
1976	Planeta dos Homens		
1978	Ciranda Cirandinha	Bel	Episode: "O Momento da Decisão"
1981	Viva o Gordo	Various characters	
1984	Amor com Amor Se Paga	Elisa Corrêa	
1985	Armação Ilimitada		Episode: "Nas Malhas da Rede"
1989	Veja o Gordo	Various characters	
1992	Você Decide		Episode: "Coração Partido"
1995	História de Amor	Marta Xavier	
1996	Salsa e Merengue	Remédios Muñoz	
1998	Meu Bem Querer	Jacira Ferreira de Souza	
2000	O Cravo e a Rosa	Dalva Lacerda Pinto	
2002	Coração de Estudante	Drª Selma	Special participation
2005	A Lua Me Disse	Adail Goldoni	
2008	Toma Lá, Dá Cá	Lurdinha	Episode: "Em Pratos Limpos"; Episode: "Errados pra cachorros"
2008	A Grande Família	Dona Carmem	Episode: "De Veterinário e Louco, Todo Mundo Tem Um Pouco"
2008	Negócio da China	Matilde Fontanera	
2010	A Vida Alheia	Dalva	Episode: "Porque Temos Fé"
2010	Ti Ti Ti	Madame Clérrie Benetazi	Special participation
2011	Aquele Beijo	Maria Antônia (Toinha) / fake Damiana Barbosa	
2013	Pé na Cova	Maria Isabel	Episode: "O Voo da Borboleta Monarca"
2013	Malhação Casa Cheia	Marinalva	Season 21; Special participation
2014	Sexo e as Negas	Leonor Canhoto	

=== Films ===
- 1984 - O Cavalinho Azul... Teacher
- 1985 - Brás Cubas
- 1989 - Sermões - A História de Antônio Vieira
- 1997 - Miramar
- 1999 - São Jerônimo... Paula
