= Muito Prazer =

1979 film by David Neves

Muito prazer
- Directed by: David Neves
- Written by: David Neves; Joaquim Vaz de Carvalho
- Starring: Ítala Nandi; Antônio Pedro; Cecil Thiré; Otávio Augusto
- Production company: Embrafilme
- Release date: 25 September 1979
- Running time: 94 minutes
- Country: Brazil
- Language: Portuguese

Muito Prazer is a 1979 Brazilian film directed by David Neves.

== Cast ==
- Ítala Nandi .... Nádia
- Antônio Pedro .... Chico
- Cecil Thiré .... Aquino
- Otávio Augusto .... Ivan
- Vera Barroso
- Carlos Kroeber
- Ângela Leal
- Irving São Paulo

== Awards ==
1979: Festival de Brasília

1. Best Picture (won)
2. Best Actor (Otávio Augusto) (won)
3. Best Cinematography (Jom Tob Azulay) (won)
