= Júlia Almeida =

Brazilian actress

- Born: Júlia Gonçalves de Almeida; 5 January 1983 (age 43); Rio de Janeiro, Brazil
- Occupation: Actress
- Years active: 1991–2012, 2018
- Spouse: Sebastian Bailey (m. 2014)
- Father: Manoel Carlos

Júlia Gonçalves de Almeida (born 5 January 1983) is a Brazilian actress.

== Biography ==
Julia Almeida is an actress born in Rio de Janeiro, and the daughter of the writer Manoel Carlos. She is best known for her solid television career at Rede Globo.

In 2001, Julia moved to New York City to study acting at the Lee Strasberg Theatre and Film Institute, and directing at the New York Film Academy.

In late 2006, Almeida returned to Brazil to shoot Duas Caras, in which she played the seductive character Fernanda. The actress has played several roles including the headstrong cinematographer Leinha in Caminho das Índias. The character was noted for making the boho chic trend popular in Brazil.

In December 2011, Almeida launched the global lifestyle and fashion online magazine, The Mark Magazine, with husband Sebastian Bailey.

Almeida divides her time between Rio de Janeiro, New York and London.

== Career ==
Júlia Almeida started her acting career in 1991, in the Rede Globo telenovela Felicidade. She played Duda in the 1995 telenovela História de Amor. Almeida participated in three other telenovelas, Por Amor in 1997, Laços de Família in 2000, and Mulheres Apaixonadas in 2003. Almeida played Luísa in the 2001 miniseries Presença de Anita. She participated in the 2004 miniseries Um Só Coração, and in the 2006 miniseries JK, both by Maria Adelaide Amaral. Almeida played the journalist Helô Machado in JK. In Duas Caras, in 2007, she played the role of a seductive character named Fernanda. In 2009, Almeida played an aspiring cineaste named Leinha in India – A Love Story. Almeida played the role of Lorena in the 2011 Rede Globo telenovela A Vida da Gente.

== Filmography ==
Year	Title	Role
1991	Felicidade	Fernanda
1995	História de Amor	Duda (Eduarda)
1997	Por Amor	Natália Saboya Trajano
2000	Laços de Família	Estela Monteiro Fernandez
2001	Presença de Anita	Luísa
2003	Mulheres Apaixonadas	Vida "Vidinha" Ribeiro Alves Nogueira
2004	Um Só Coração	Adelaide Guerrini de Almeida
2006	JK	Helô Machado
2007	Duas Caras	Fernanda Carreira
2009	Caminho das Índias	Léia "Leinha" Félix
2011	Divã	Magali
2011	A Vida da Gente	Lorena
2018	Tempo de Amar	Eva
