= Roberto Alvim =

Brazilian theatre director

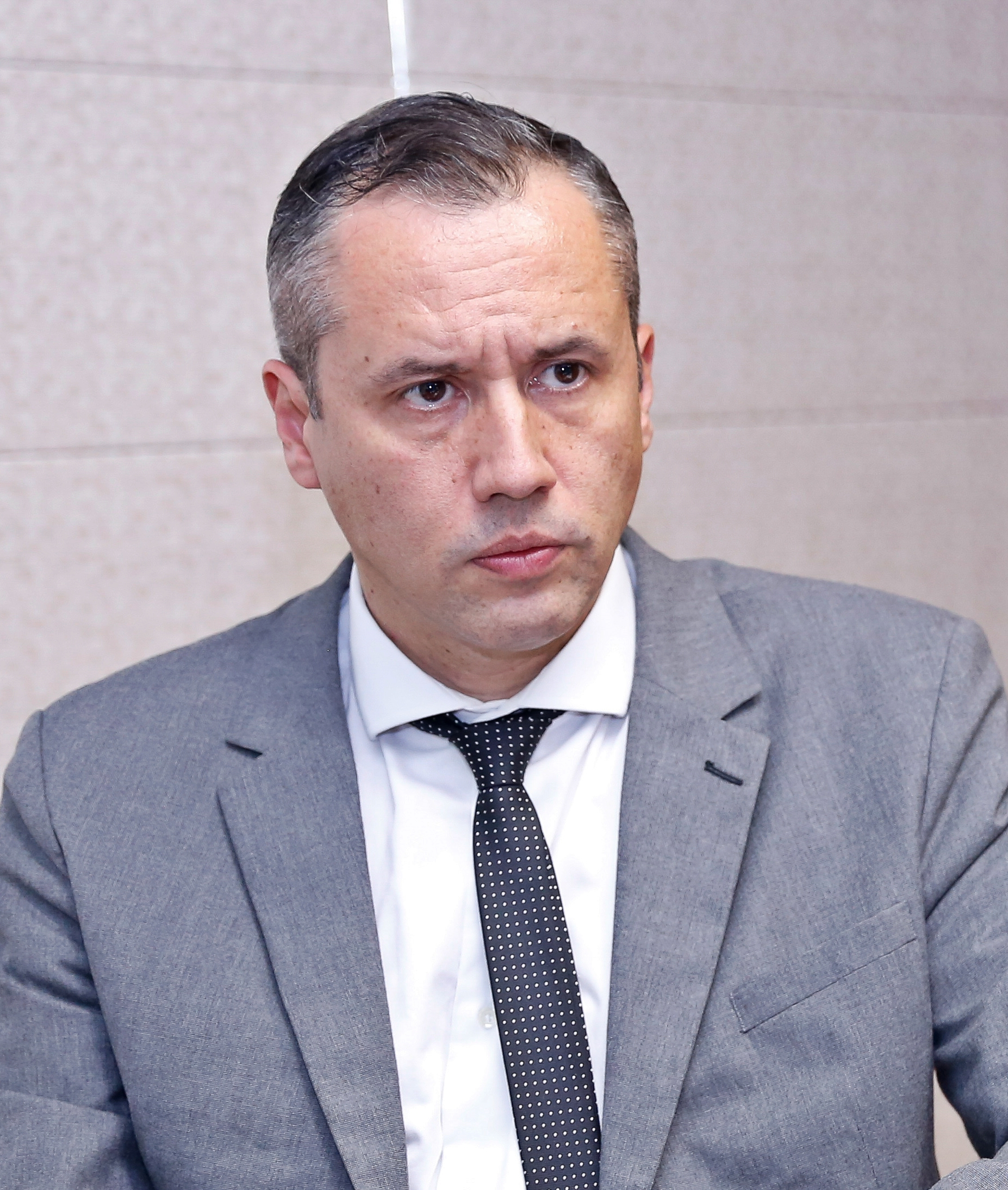

Special Secretary of Culture
- In office 7 November 2019 – 17 January 2020
- President: Jair Bolsonaro
- Minister: Marcelo Álvaro Antônio
- Preceded by: Henrique Pires
- Succeeded by: Regina Duarte

Personal details
- Born: Roberto Rego Pinheiro; 1973 (age 52–53)

Roberto Alvim is a Brazilian theatre director. He was the founder and director of the Club Noir theatre in São Paulo from 2006 to 2019. Since June 18, 2019, he has served as head director of Ceacen, Center of Performing Arts, in the National Foundation of the Arts (Funarte). On November 7, 2019 he was nominated Special Secretary for Culture under the auspices of the Ministry of Tourism, only to be fired on January 17, 2020, after plagiarizing a speech by German Nazi politician Joseph Goebbels in a government-sanctioned video.

== Controversy ==
=== Fernanda Montenegro incident ===
In September 2019, there was push-back against his verbal attack against the actress Fernanda Montenegro. Roberto Alvim called her "dirty" and "liar" in a Facebook post.

=== Goebbels' speech ===
On 16 January 2020, while holding the office of Special Culture Secretary from the Ministry of Tourism, Alvim published a video on the Secretary's official Twitter account in which he paraphrases excerpts from a speech by Joseph Goebbels, Nazi Germany's Reichsminister of Propaganda. The fact that excerpts from Wagner's Lohengrin were used as the soundtrack for his video was taken by some commentators as an allusion to Nazism. The video soon after caused public uproar, and was deleted the following day. In response, Alvim posted a Facebook update in which he states he "hasn't cited anyone" and that the whole incident was a mere "rhetorical coincidence".

The German art of the next decade will be heroic, it will be steely-romantic, it will be factual and completely free of sentimentality, it will be national will great pathos and binding, or it will be nothing.

— Joseph Goebbels

The Brazilian art of the next decade will be heroic and will be national, will be endowed with great capacity for emotional involvement... deeply linked to the urgent aspirations of our people, or else it will be nothing.

— Roberto Alvim

Following the public's reaction, on 17 January 2020, Alvim was fired. Addressing the controversy, president Jair Bolsonaro stated: "I repeat our rejection of totalitarian and genocidal ideologies, as well as any allusion to it". Regina Duarte was subsequently invited to be Special Secretary of Culture, succeeding Alvim, but she did not immediately accept the job.

== Personal life ==
Alvim became a born-again Christian during a struggle with cancer.

Political offices
| Preceded by Henrique Pires | Special Secretary of Culture; 2019–2020 | Succeeded by Regina Duarte |
