= Carinhoso =

- Genre: Telenovela
- Created by: Lauro César Muniz
- Based on: Sabrina Fair by Samuel Taylor
- Directed by: Daniel Filho; Walter Campos
- Starring: Regina Duarte; Cláudio Marzo; Marcos Paulo; Débora Duarte; Herval Rossano
- Opening theme: "Carinhoso" by Márcio Montarroyos
- Country of origin: Brazil
- Original language: Portuguese
- No. of episodes: 173

Production
- Running time: 45 minutes

Original release
- Network: TV Globo
- Release: 2 July 1973 – 18 January 1974

Related
- Uma Rosa com Amor; Supermanoela

Carinhoso is a Brazilian telenovela produced and broadcast by TV Globo. It premiered on 2 July 1973 and ended on 18 January 1974, with a total of 173 episodes. It's the twelfth "novela das sete" to be aired at the timeslot. It is created by Lauro César Muniz and directed by Daniel Filho with Walter Campos.

== Cast ==
Actor	Character
Regina Duarte	Cecília
Marcos Paulo	Eduardo Vasconcelos
Cláudio Marzo	Humberto Vasconcelos Filho
Débora Duarte	Marisa
Herval Rossano	Santiago Morales
Rosamaria Murtinho	Ivone
Fúlvio Stefanini	Sérgio
Cláudio Cavalcanti	Paulo
Lúcia Alves	Leda Maria
Lícia Magna	Esmeralda
Gilberto Martinho	Felipe
Célia Biar	Hermínia Vasconcelos
Jorge Cherques	Humberto Vasconcelos
Mauro Mendonça	Vicente
Suzana Faini	Renata
Germano Filho	Arquimedes
Zeni Pereira	Donana
Marco Nanini	Faísca
Riva Blanche	Mariana
Irma Alvarez	Clara Morales
Reinaldo Gonzaga	Júlio (Julinho)
Arthur Costa Filho	Ramon
Mary Daniel	Marieta Morales
Juan Daniel	José Morales
Anilza Leo	Luzia
Hélio Ary	Dr. João Cláudio
Lídia Vani	Isaura
Ademir Rocha	Gastão
