= Duse Nacaratti =

Brazilian actress and comedian

- Born: 22 June 1942; Cataguases, MG
- Died: 23 July 2009 (aged 67); Rio de Janeiro, RJ
- Occupation: Actress

Duse Nacaratti (22 June 1942 – 23 July 2009) was a Brazilian actress and comedian, known for roles in films, theater productions and telenovelas. She was nicknamed the "Soberana da comédia" by fellow actors.

== Biography ==
She was born in Cataguases, Minas Gerais, on 22 June 1942.

Many of the theater productions in which Nacaratti appeared during her career were written by playwright and dramatist, Nelson Rodrigues. She appeared in two productions of Beijo no asfalto in 1967 and 2001. Nacaratti later appeared opposite actress Malu Mader in "Vestido de noiva" (Wedding Dress). Her last theatrical performance came in the 2008 production of A falecida, which was directed João Fonseca and written by playwright Nelson Rodrigues.

Nacaratti's film credits included O grande mentecapto in 1989, Romance de empregada in 1988, Com licença, eu vou à luta in 1986 and Bete balanço in 1984. Her last film was 2008's Elvis & Madona.

Her television roles included parts in the Brava gente, Site Picapau Yellow and the Chico Anysio Show television series. Other notable performances included Corpo a corpo in 1984, Sol de verão in 1982, Cambalacho in 1986 and Desejos de mulher in 2002. Nacaratti's last television role was in the 2008 television movie, Negócio da China (Business in China) in which she portrayed the character, Aunt Saudade.

Duse Nacaratti died of respiratory failure on 23 July 2009, around 9 A.M. at the Hospital Ipanema Plus in southern Rio de Janeiro, Brazil, at the age of 67.

== Filmography ==
=== Film ===
Year	Title	Role	Notes
1984	Bete Balanço	Witness	
1985	Areias Escaldantes	No banco	
1986	Com Licença, Eu Vou à Luta	Teresa	
1986	Vento Sul		
1987	The Story of Fausta	Amiga de Fausta	
1989	O Grande Mentecapto		
2009	Dzi Croquettes	Herself	
2010	Elvis & Madona	Jura	Final film role

=== Television ===
- 1982: Chico Anysio Show - Tiete
- 1982-1983: Sol de Verão - Madalena
- 1984: Corpo a Corpo - Virgínia Mercier
- 1986: Cambalacho - Cibele Sampaio
- 2001: Brava Gente - Mãe de Marcilene
- 2002: Desejos de Mulher - Iracema
- 2005: Alma Gêmea - Bruxa
- 2007: Sítio do Picapau Amarelo - Velha Firinfiféia
- 2008: Faça sua História - senhora que apresenta o novo táxi a Oswaldir
- 2008-2009: Negócio da China - Tia Saudade
