= Sansão e Dalila =

- Genre: Miniseries; Biblical epic
- Based on: Book of Judges
- Written by: Gustavo Reiz
- Directed by: João Camargo
- Starring: Fernando Pavão; Mel Lisboa; Rafaela Mandelli; Marcelo Escorel; Roberto Pirillo; Lu Grimaldi; João Vitti
- Country of origin: Brazil
- Original language: Portuguese
- No. of episodes: 18

Production
- Camera setup: Multi-camera
- Production company: RecordTV

Original release
- Network: RecordTV
- Release: January 4 – February 2, 2011

Sansão e Dalila (English: Samson and Delilah) is a Brazilian miniseries produced and broadcast by RecordTV. It premiered on January 4, 2011 and ended on February 2, 2011. The series is based on the Book of Judges.

== Plot ==
Sansão is a strong and courageous Hebrew man. From birth, he was dedicated to the liberation of his people, who were oppressed and persecuted. He fights against wild animals and enemy armies of his people. He keeps the source of his strength a mystery.

Meanwhile, Dalila, an ambitious Philistine woman, is chosen by Inarus, the prince of Gaza, to be a courtesan in his palace. In search of power, Dalila draws attention to her exuberant beauty and very soon becomes the favorite among all the courtesans.

Sansão is unsurpassed, wins many battles and provokes the wrath of his main enemy, the Philistines. His triumph reaches the ears of those in Inarus's court. Prince Inarus is so infuriated by every victory of the Hebrew warrior against his powerful and well-equipped army that he allows Dalila to try to persuade Sansão to reveal to her the secret of his strength.

== Cast ==
- Fernando Pavão as Sansão
- Mel Lisboa as Dalila
- Thais Fersoza as Samara
- Rafaela Mandelli as Ieda
- Milhem Cortaz as Abbas
- Marcelo Escorel as Inarus
- Rogério Fróes as Alían
- Roberto Pirillo as Simas
- Claudio Gabriel as Heber
- Lu Grimaldi as Zila
- Juliana Lohmann as Judi
- Miguel Thiré as Faruk
- Karen Junqueira as Tais
- Luiza Curvo as Myra
- Leandro Léo as Carid
- Emilio Dantas as Nora/Aron
- Noemi Gerbelli as Ama
- Ittala Nandi as Zaira
- Nina de Pádua as Agar
- João Vitti as Mensageiro
- Roberto Frota as Manoa
- Valéria Alencar as Hannah
- Livia Rossy as Ayla
- Luli Miller as Jana
- Joana Balaguer as Yunet
- Cássio Ramos as Alexis
- Camilo Bevilacqua as Rudiju
- Felipe Cardoso as Jidafe
- Luiz Nicolau as Bak
- Rodrigo Costa as Gadi
