= Jorge Cherques =

Brazilian actor

- Born: July 25, 1928; Rio de Janeiro, Brazil
- Died: March 11, 2011 (aged 82); Rio de Janeiro, Brazil
- Occupation: Actor
- Years active: 1943–2010

Jorge Cherques (July 25, 1928 – March 11, 2011) was a Brazilian actor of Jewish origin.

== Biography ==
Born in Rio de Janeiro, of Jewish descent, Jorge began his theatrical career while still in his youth. In 1943, he was part of the cast of Nelson Rodrigues' play Vestido de Noiva. He had an extensive career in theater, winning awards for great performances, including in Um bonde chamado desejo and Ratos e Homens.

In the 1950s, he was invited to participate in Grande Teatro Tupi, presented on the now defunct TV Tupi, and later joined the cast of TV Globo, where he made his debut in Janete Clair's soap opera Véu de Noiva in 1969. His film debut was in the 1964 movie O Beijo, directed by Flávio Tambellini, based on Nelson Rodrigues' play O Beijo no Asfalto.

In the 1980s, he made several films with Os Trapalhões, a popular Brazilian comedy group. At the end of the 1990s, he began to devote himself to theater and training actors. On TV, the actor participated in important soap operas such as Carinhoso, Gabriela, A Sucessora, Paraíso, Dona Beija, Vamp, História de Amor, Alma Gêmea, as well as the children's series Sítio do Pica-Pau Amarelo. In the field of comedy, he participated in the series A Diarista. His last role on television was in the comedy show Zorra Total, in 2008.

His last acting role was in 2010, in Thomas Edward Hale's medium-length film Viver Outra Vez, whose proceeds were donated to Retiro dos Artistas, a Brazilian charity that shelters elderly artists who are experiencing financial and emotional difficulties, have been abandoned by their families, or have nowhere to live.

== Personal life ==
A Jew, he always encouraged the Jewish community in São Paulo to create a theater group of Jewish actors. He was married to Estela Cheques from 1951 until 1985, with whom he had two daughters, Cecília and Gilda.

=== Death ===
Cherques died at the age of 82, victim of multiple organ failure, after being admitted to the intensive care unit at Copa D'Or Hospital in Copacabana on March 11, 2011. The actor's body was laid in state at the Chevra Kadisha Israeli Religious Society, located in the Praça da Bandeira neighborhood of Rio. The burial took place at the Israeli Cemetery of Vilar dos Teles, in São João de Meriti, in the Baixada Fluminense region.

== Filmography ==
=== Television ===
| Year | Title | Role | Notes |
|---|---|---|---|
| 1969 | Véu de Noiva | Wilson | |
| 1971 | O Homem Que Deve Morrer | Werner Von Müller | |
| 1972 | Jerônimo, o Herói do Sertão | | |
| 1972 | Uma Rosa com Amor | Hugo Lombardi | |
| 1973 | Carinhoso | Vasconcelos Lima | |
| 1975 | Gabriela | Priest Basílio | |
| 1977 | Espelho Mágico | Alfredo Barbosa | |
| 1978 | A Sucessora | Lopes | |
| 1978 | Sítio do Picapau Amarelo | Pericles | Episode: "O Minotauro" |
| 1980 | As Três Marias | Police officer Damasceno | |
| 1981 | Ciranda de Pedra | Casemiro Garcia | |
| 1982 | Elas por Elas | Jurandir | |
| 1982 | Paraíso | Bertoni | |
| 1983 | Parabéns pra Você | Lucas | |
| 1984 | Livre para Voar | Max | |
| 1984 | Meu Destino É Pecar | Borborema | |
| 1984 | Padre Cícero | Bishop Arcoverde | |
| 1985 | Antônio Maria | Doutor Adalberto Dias Leme | |
| 1986 | Dona Beija | John IV of Portugal | |
| 1986 | Sinhá Moça | Priest Cesário | |
| 1987 | Bambolê | Jorge Bernardo Jó da Silva | |
| 1988 | Caso Especial | | Episode: "Jorge, Um Brasileiro" |
| 1988 | O Pagador de Promessas | Don Romário | |
| 1989 | O Salvador da Pátria | | |
| 1990 | Rainha da Sucata | Ciro Laurenza | |
| 1991 | Vamp | Friar Bartholomeu | |
| 1992 | Tereza Batista | | |
| 1993 | Mulheres de Areia | Abílio Vasquez | |
| 1993 | Sonho Meu | Mr. Ivan | |
| 1994 | Incidente em Antares | Egon Sturm | |
| 1995 | Explode Coração | Father of Salgadinho's lover | |
| 1995 | Irmãos Coragem | Sousa | |
| 1995 | História de Amor | Noé | |
| 1997 | Por Amor | Lourenço | |
| 1998 | Torre de Babel | Dr. Jorge | |
| 1998 | Você Decide | Colonel | Episode: "O Feitiço da Lua da Arábia" |
| 1999 | Chiquinha Gonzaga | | |
| 2006 | Alma Gêmea | Alexandra's gynecologist | |
| 2006 | A Diarista | | Episode: "Aquele do Papagaio" |
| 2008 | Zorra Total | Various characters | |

=== Film ===
| Year | Title | Role | Notes | Ref. |
|---|---|---|---|---|
| 1965 | O Beijo | Chief of Arandir | | |
| 1967 | A Espiã Que Entrou em Fria | Uncle | | |
| 1967 | Carnaval Barra Limpa | | | |
| 1968 | Massacre no Supermercado | Detective Elias | | |
| 1968 | A Compadecida | Bisp | | |
| 1970 | O Enterro da Cafetina | Magazine Editor | | |
| 1971 | Como Ganhar na Loteria sem Perder a Esportiva | Police officer | | |
| 1971 | Pra Quem Fica, Tchau | Maria's husband | | |
| 1971 | Rua Descalça | | | |
| 1971 | Vale do Canaã | | | |
| 1972 | Salve-se Quem Puder – Rally da Juventude | Aníbal | | |
| 1973 | A Filha de Madame Betina | Jorge, the neighbor | | |
| 1973 | Aladim e a Lâmpada Maravilhosa | Commissioner | | |
| 1973 | Um Virgem na Praça | | | |
| 1974 | O Filho do Chefão | Detective | | |
| 1974 | Robin Hood, o Trapalhão da Floresta | João Crimério | | |
| 1975 | Deixa, Amorzinho... Deixa | | | |
| 1975 | Uma Mulata Para Todos | Fausto | | |
| 1976 | Simbad, o Marujo Trapalhão | Duarte | | |
| 1979 | O Caso Cláudia | Drug dealer | | |
| 1979 | Teu Tua | | | |
| 1979 | Vamos Cantar Disco Baby | Dr. Sérgio Pancada | | |
| 1980 | Consórcio de Intrigas | Farmer | | |
| 1980 | Os Três Mosqueteiros Trapalhões | Dr. Luís Rocha Cerqueira Lima | | |
| 1981 | A Gostosa da Gafieira | Mauro | | |
| 1982 | Dôra Doralina | | | |
| 1984 | A Filha dos Trapalhões | Gang leader | | |
| 1984 | Atrapalhando a Suate | Scientist | | |
| 1984 | Memórias do Cárcere | Dr. Goldberg | | |
| 1985 | Pedro Mico | Dr. Goldman | | |
| 1988 | Moon Over Parador | Family member | | |
| 1997 | O Que É Isso, Companheiro? | | | |
| 1999 | O Trapalhão e a Luz Azul | King Emir | | |
| 2000 | A Terceira Morte de Joaquim Bolívar | Pedro Ernesto | | |
