= Mulher Objeto =

1981 film directed by Silvio de Abreu

- Directed by: Silvio de Abreu
- Written by: Jayme Camargo
- Produced by: Aníbal Massaini Neto
- Starring: Helena Ramos; Nuno Leal Maia
- Cinematography: Antônio Meliande
- Edited by: Luiz Elias
- Music by: Francis Lai
- Production companies: Cinedistri; Cinearte
- Distributed by: Cinedistri; União Cinematográfica Brasileira; Embrafilme
- Release date: October 1, 1981 (São Paulo)
- Running time: 125 minutes
- Country: Brazil
- Language: Portuguese

Mulher Objeto is a 1981 Brazilian erotic drama directed by Silvio de Abreu.

== Synopsis ==
Story about the fantasies of a married woman who lives in a dream several experiences with partners of both sexes.

== Cast ==
- Helena Ramos as Regina
- Nuno Leal Maia as Hélio
- Kate Lyra as Helen
- Maria Lúcia Dahl as Maruska
- Hélio Souto as Fernando
- Yara Amaral as Carmem
- Wilma Dias as Lúcia
- Karin Rodrigues as Analista
- Carlos Koppa as Genésio

== Production ==
Helena Ramos was pregnant during filming. Director Silvio de Abreu recalls: "She never complained about anything, she was always on time, knew the text, obeyed the markings, followed the intonations and responded to the stimuli. We only had one problem in the last scene shot. It was a very naughty sex sequence, she was naked with her body covered in oil so that her beautiful forms would shine in the sun, on top of a horse with Danton Jardim, also naked. I told her to repeat it many times and she ended up losing patience: 'I can't ride anymore, I'm pregnant, I'll lose my son'. No one knew about her condition, and so, once again, she proved her professionalism, putting up with it as much as she could to do the scene in the best possible way."
