= Mel Lisboa =

Brazilian actress

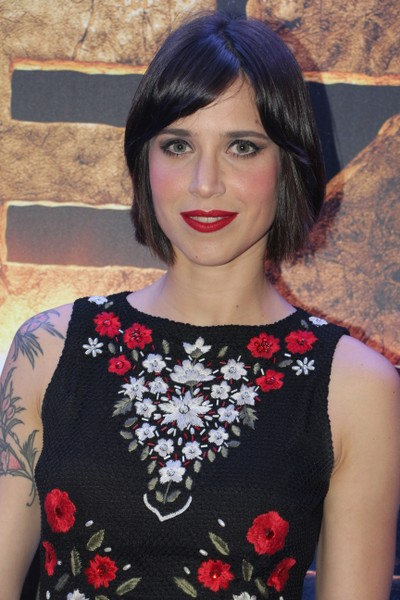
- Lisboa at the premiere of the film The Ten Commandments in 2016
- Born: Mel Lisboa Alves; 17 January 1982 (age 44); Porto Alegre, Rio Grande do Sul, Brazil
- Education: Fluminense Federal University (dropped out)
- Occupation: Actress
- Years active: 2001–present
- Spouse: Daniel Alvim (m. 2004; div. 2008) Felipe Rosseno (m. 2008)
- Children: 2

Mel Lisboa Alves (born 17 January 1982) is a Brazilian actress.

== Biography ==
Lisboa was born in Porto Alegre, Rio Grande do Sul. She is the daughter of the astrologer Cláudia Lisboa Alves and the musician Bebeto Alves. She studied cinema at the Fluminense Federal University (UFF), in Niterói, but left the course to pursue acting. She has no direct degree of kinship with the gaúcho musician Nei Lisboa.

== Career ==
She debuted as an actress in 2001, starring in the miniseries, Presença de Anita, playing Anita, a mysterious and seductive young woman. Due to the great sexual appeal of this character, she participated in a sensual essay for the Paparazzo site. The mini-series earned an average of 30 IBOPE points and was broadcast in full in 2002 on TV Globo.

In 2002, in the soap opera Desejos de Mulher, she played Gabriela, a young woman from the interior with aspirations of becoming a model. This project was not as successful as Presença de Anita, due to Lisboa’s association with her previous role and the low ratings of the pilot. The actress, at the time, acknowledged that she was dazzled by the success of such a prominent role, but that the experience of playing another role with little acceptance allowed her to mature.

In 2003, she participated in a second sensual essay, this time for Trip magazine. The following year she posed naked for the Brazilian edition of Playboy magazine, in its 29th anniversary edition. In the same year, after signing a contract with SBT which failed to go ahead, she returned to Rede Globo and worked on the soap opera Como uma Onda, playing Lenita Paiva, a spoiled rich girl.

In 2007 she became a television presenter at GNT / Sat TV Globo and released the book Mundo Afora – Diário de Bordo de Mel Lisboa, which included stories and photographs from her program. The same year she joined the cast of the soap opera Sete Pecados ("Seven Sins"), in which she played the role of Carla, a young, humble, but extremely ambitious girl with a questionable personality.

In 2011 she signed with Rede Record TV. Her first role was in the series Sansão e Dalila ("Samson and Deliah"), playing the female protagonist.

In October 2012, she was admitted to the hospital with an intestinal virus and had to cancel espetáculo.

In 2013, the actress returned to the stage in a theater play, Homem Não Entra, bringing the Western genre to the stage. She also returned to television in a new GNT show, As Canalhas, and a telenovela written by Carlos Lombardi, Pecado Mortal in the Rede Record.

In 2014, Mel Lisboa portrayed the singer Rita Lee in the play Rita Lee Mora ao Lado – O Musical, directed by Márcio Macena and Débora Dubois, based on the book Rita Lee Mora ao Lado – Uma biografia alucinada da rainha do rock, written by Henrique Bartsch.

In 2015 she played Henutmire in Os Dez Mandamentos, her most recent work on Rede Record.

== Personal life ==
Mel Lisboa was married to Brazilian actor Daniel Alvim from 2004 to 2008, and on November 8 of that same year, married musician Felipe Rosseno. The couple has been together since then and they have two children.

In 2009, she declared herself an atheist in an interview given to Tpm magazine.

== Filmography ==
=== Television ===
Year	Title	Role	Notes
2001	Presença de Anita	Anita (Cíntia)	
2001	Os Normais	Taty	Episode: "Tentações São Normais"
2002	Desejos de Mulher	Gabriela Diniz	
2004	Como uma Onda	Lenita Paiva	
2005	Casseta & Planeta, Urgente!	Melanie	Episode: "July 12, 2005"
2006	Oi Mundo Afora	Presenter	
2007	Sete Pecados	Carla da Silva	
2008	Casos e Acasos	Júlia	Episode: "O Ex, a Promoção e o Vizinho"
2011	Sansão e Dalila	Delilah	
2013	As Canalhas	Mariana	Episode: "Mariana"
2013	Pecado Mortal	Márcia Figueiredo (Marcinha)	
2015	Os Dez Mandamentos	Hanutmire (young)	Episodes: "March 23–30, 2015"
2016	Lili, a Ex	Nadine	Episode: "Fantasma!"
2017	Prata da Casa	Marina Sampaio	Episode: "Fama"
2017	Pacto de Sangue	Gringa	
2019	Girls from Ipanema	Thereza Soares	
2022	Cara e Coragem	Regina	
2024	Astronauta	Ritinha	Voice

=== Film ===
Year	Title	Role	Notes
2004	A Cartomante	Vitória	
2004	Gasolina Comum	Regina	Short film
2005	O Casamento de Romeu e Julieta	Joana	
2006	Sonhos e Desejos	Cristiana	
2007	A Última Contravenção	Joana	
2008	Ao Vivo	Sofia	Short film
2015	Memórias da Boca		
2016	The Ten Commandments: The Movie	Hanutmire	First phase
2016	Cães Famintos	Ana	
2016	G.A.D.O	Daniela	
2016	The Young Messiah	Mary	Brazilian voice dubbing
2016	Magal e os Formigas	Sandra	
2017	The Killer		

=== Internet ===
Year	Title	Role
2017	A Herança	Luciana Ferreira Reis

== Theater ==
Year	Title	Role	Notes
2002	Confissões de Adolescente	Natália	
2003	Há Vaga Para Moças de Fino Trato	Lúcia	
2003	Brutal	Sol	
2003	Luluzinhas	Agnes	
2006	Mordendo Os Lábios	Eleonora	
2008	A Mulher do Candidato	Silvia	
2009	Cyrano	Roxanne	
2010	Após A Chuva	Agnes	
2010	Mulheres Alteradas	Lisa	
2012	Cine Camaleão – A Boca do Lixo	Wanda Scarlatti	
2013	Homem Não Entra	Brigitte	
2013	Superadas	Patrícia	
2014	Rita Lee Mora ao Lado – O Musical	Rita Lee	2014–2016
2015	Cenas de Uma Execução		
2015	Otelo	Desdemona	2015–2016
2015	Luz Negra	Vanda Marchetti	2015–2016
2016	Peer Gynt	Solveig	
2017	Roque Santeiro – O Musical	Santinha	
2017	Pescadora de Ilusão	Eu	
2022	Misery	Annie Wilkes	
