= Manoel Carlos =

Brazilian screenwriter (1933–2026)

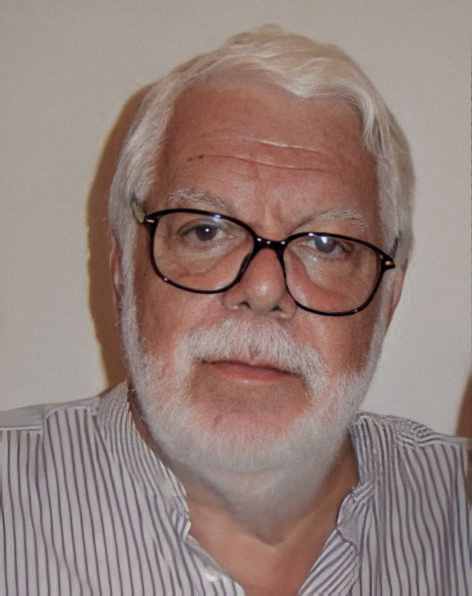
- Manoel Carlos in 2004
- Born: Manoel Carlos Gonçalves de Almeida; 14 March 1933; São Paulo, Brazil
- Died: 10 January 2026 (aged 92); Rio de Janeiro, Brazil
- Occupations: Screenwriter, director, producer, actor
- Years active: 1950–2015
- Children: 5 (3 deceased)

Manoel Carlos Gonçalves de Almeida (14 March 1933 – 10 January 2026), popularly known as Maneco, was a Brazilian screenwriter, director, producer and actor. He was the father of actress Júlia Almeida.

From the 1990 decade on, his telenovelas became known for portraiting the lives of the upper middle-class Rio de Janeiro society, especially in the Leblon neighborhood. Another of his marks is that several of his works have a different protagonist named '"Helena"; Carlos said he drew inspiration on Helen of Troy, finding the name more appropriate to a character than to a real-life person.

Carlos died in Rio de Janeiro on 10 January 2026, at the age of 92.

== Filmography ==
=== Screenplays ===
- 1956–1959: Grande Teatro Tupi (16 episodes)
- 1978: Maria, Maria (125 episodes)
- 1978–1979: A Sucessora (124 episodes)
- 1979–1980: Malu Mulher (2 episodes)
- 1980: Água Viva (160 episodes)
- 1981: Baila Comigo (163 episodes)
- 1982–1983: Sol de Verão (137 episodes)
- 1984: Joana
- 1984: Viver la Vida (209 episodes)
- 1986: Novo Amor (65 episodes)
- 1989: O Cometa (4 episodes)
- 1990: El magnate (136 episodes)
- 1991: Manuela (228 episodes)
- 1991–1992: Felicidade (203 episodes)
- 1993: Caso Especial (1 episode)
- 1995–1996: História de Amor (209 episodes)
- 1997–1998: Por Amor (60 episodes)
- 1999: Isabella (1 episode)
- 2000: Laços de Família (209 episodes)
- 2001: Presença de Anita (5 episodes)
- 2001: Presença de Anita - O Filme (TV film)
- 2003: Mulheres Apaixonadas (Women in love in English; 197 episodes)
- 2006: Páginas da Vida (Pages of Life in English; 201 episodes)
- 2009: Maysa: Quando Fala o Coração (Maysa: When the Heart Sings in English; 2 episodes)
- 2009-2010: Viver a Vida (Seize the Day in English; 209 episodes)
- 2014: Em Famíla (Helena's Shadow in English; 139 episodes; also Producer)
- 2015: Luz, Câmera, 50 Anos (1 episode)

=== Directed by him ===
- 1967: A Família Trapo (189 episodes)
