= Vera Holtz =

Brazilian actress

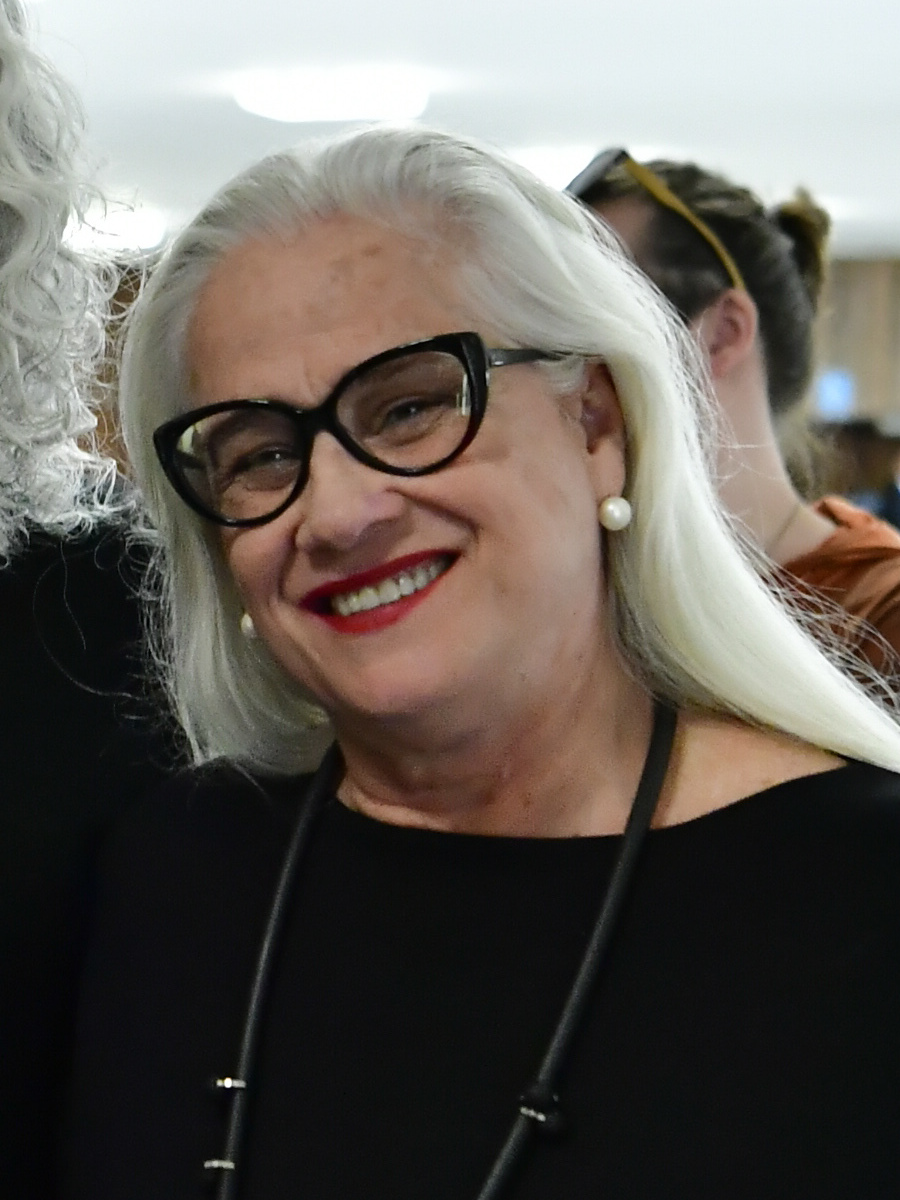
- Holtz in 2023
- Born: Vera Lúcia Fraletti Holtz; 7 August 1953 (age 72); Tatuí, São Paulo, Brazil
- Occupation: Actress
- Years active: 1975–present

Vera Lúcia Fraletti Holtz (born 7 August 1953) is a Brazilian television, film and stage actress.

== Filmography ==
=== Television ===
- 1983 - Parabéns pra Você .... saleswoman
- 1989 - Top Model .... Irma Lamer
- 1989 - Que Rei Sou Eu? .... Fanny
- 1990 - Barriga de Aluguel .... Dos Anjos
- 1990 - Desejo .... Angélica
- 1991 - Vamp .... Ms. Alice Penn Taylor
- 1992 - De Corpo e Alma .... Simone Guedes
- 1993 - Fera Ferida .... Querubina Praxedes de Menezes
- 1995 - A Próxima Vítima .... Quitéria Quarta-Feira (Quitéria Bezerra)
- 1996 - O Fim do Mundo .... Florisbela Mendonça
- 1996 - Você Decide, A Troca
- 1997 - Por Amor .... Sirléia Pereira
- 1999 - Chiquinha Gonzaga .... Dona Ló
- 2000 - Uga-Uga .... Santa
- 2000 - A Muralha .... Mãe Cândida Olinto
- 2001 - Presença de Anita .... Marta
- 2002 - Desejos de Mulher .... Bárbara Toledo
- 2003 - Mulheres Apaixonadas .... Santana Gurgel
- 2004 - Cabocla .... Generosa
- 2005 - Belíssima .... Ornela Sabattini
- 2005 - Carga Pesada .... Catarina
- 2006 - O Profeta .... Ana
- 2007 - Paraíso Tropical .... Marion Novaes
- 2008 - Dilemas de Irene - Dona Célia
- 2008 - Três Irmãs .... Violeta Áquila
- 2010 - Passione - Maria Candelária Lobato (Candê)
- 2012 - Avenida Brasil - Lucinda
- 2013 - Saramandaia - Dona Redonda
- 2016 - A Lei do Amor - Maria Magnólia Costa Leitão (Mág)
- 2019 - Amor de Mãe - Kátia

=== Cinema ===
Year	Title	Role	Notes
1991	Assim na Tela como no Céu		
1992	Meu Nome é João		Short film
1993	Capitalismo Selvagem		
1993	Diário Noturno		Short film
1994	Mil e Uma		
1995	Vicente		Short film
1995	O Menino Maluquinho		
1995	Carlota Joaquina, Princess of Brazil		
1996	Nos Tempos do Cinematógrapho		Short film
2000	Tônica Dominante		
2003	Apolônio Brasil, Campeão da Alegria		
2005	Bendito Fruto		
2006	Anjos do Sol	Nazaré	
2006	O Cavaleiro Didi e a Princesa Lili		
2011	Família Vende Tudo		
2023	Aunt Virginia	Aunt Virginia	
