= Amor com Amor Se Paga =

- Genre: Telenovela
- Created by: Ivani Ribeiro
- Based on: Camomila e Bem-me-quer by Ivani Ribeiro
- Directed by: Gonzaga Blota
- Starring: Ary Fontoura; Yoná Magalhães; Carlos Eduardo Dolabella; Berta Loran; Fernando Torres; Bia Nunnes; Edson Celulari; Cláudia Ohana; Caíque Ferreira; Flávio Galvão; Wanda Stefânia; Arlete Salles; Milton Moraes; Adriano Reys; Beatriz Lyra; Mayara Magri; Matheus Carrieri; Narjara Turetta
- Opening theme: "Levantar o Astral"
- Composer: Edinho Santa Cruz
- Country of origin: Brazil
- Original language: Portuguese
- No. of episodes: 155

Production
- Producer: Marcílio Dias

Original release
- Network: TV Globo
- Release: March 19 – September 14, 1984

Amor com Amor Se Paga is a Brazilian telenovela produced and displayed at the time of 18 hours by TV Globo, March 19 to September 14, 1984, in 155 chapters. Substitute Voltei pra Você and be succeeded by Livre para Voar.

Written by Ivani Ribeiro, with collaboration of Solange Castro Neves, was inspired by the plot Camomila e bem-me-quer, and was directed by Gonzaga Blota, Atílio Riccó and Jayme Monjardim.

It was one of the most seen novels of the time of the 18 hours of the Globo. Decades after the first showing of the novel, Ary Fontoura claims to be still called his Nonô on the street, because of the great success of the plot.

== Cast ==
Actor	Character
Ary Fontoura	Nonô Correia
Yoná Magalhães	Grace (Maria da Graça)
Carlos Eduardo Dolabella	Bruno
Fernando Torres	Tio Romão
Berta Loran	Frosina Maria de Jesus
Edson Celulari	Tomás Correia
Cláudia Ohana	Mariana Correia
Bia Nunnes	Elisa Correia
Caíque Ferreira	Gustavo
Flávio Galvão	Tito Mourão
Wanda Stefânia	Santusa Mourão
Arlete Salles	Sílvia
Matheus Carrieri	Johnny (João Paulo)
Mayara Magri	Rosemary (Rose)
Adriano Reys	Vinicius
Beatriz Lyra	Helena
Narjara Turetta	Bel (Isabel)
Milton Moraes	Antonio Barreto
Miguel Falabella	Renato
Júlia Lemmertz	Ângela
Carlos Kroeber	Anselmo
Wanda Kosmo	Elvira
Ana Ariel	Leonor
Chica Xavier	Judite
Paulo César Grande	Sérgio Barreto
Darcy de Souza	Filó (Filomena)
Mário Cardoso	Rogê
Lajar Muzuris	Antonio (Tonicão)
Andréa Avancini	Odete
Oberdan Júnior	Zezinho (José Mourão)
Graziela Di Laurentis	Dóris
Vera Gimenez	Zélia Barreto
Paulo Gonçalves	Priest Inácio
Hugo Gross	Cacá
Yaçanã Martins	Magali
José Carlos Sanches	Eduardo (Edu)
