= Presença de Anita =

2001 Brazilian drama television miniseries

- Also known as: The Presence of Anita
- Genre: Drama
- Based on: Presença de Anita by Mário Donato
- Screenplay by: Manoel Carlos
- Directed by: Ricardo Waddington; Alexandre Avancini
- Starring: Mel Lisboa; José Mayer; Helena Ranaldi; Leonardo Miggiorin; Vera Holtz
- Theme music composer: Jacques Brel
- Opening theme: "Ne me quitte pas", performed by Maysa
- Country of origin: Brazil
- Original language: Portuguese
- No. of episodes: 16

Production
- Producer: Ruy Mattos
- Production locations: Vassouras, Rio de Janeiro; Valença, Rio de Janeiro
- Cinematography: Elton Menezes
- Editors: Gilson Câmara; Willian Alves Correia Jr.
- Running time: 29–71 minutes

Original release
- Release: 7 August – 31 August 2001

Presença de Anita (English: The Presence of Anita) is a 2001 Brazilian drama television miniseries based on the 1948 novel of the same name by Mário Donato. Directed by Ricardo Waddington and Alexandre Avancini, the series aired on Rede Globo from 7 to 31 August 2001, consisting of 16 episodes.

It is a story about obsession, seduction, and death, centering around an 18-year-old girl named Anita, and a 45-year-old family man, Fernando. The miniseries stars Mel Lisboa and José Mayer as the main characters. Lisboa, who was 19 at the time, had her acting debut in this series, playing her most famous role to date.

== Synopsis ==
The plot begins with a couple, Lucia Helena (Helena Ranaldi) and Fernando (José Mayer), who are going through a marital crisis. He is an architect with literary aspirations who wants to finish his first book. She is a woman whose main concern is rescuing the love of her husband and saving her marriage. They live in the urban chaos of São Paulo. Lucia Helena decides to invest in a trip with the family, her son Luiz, and her stepdaughter Luiza (Júlia Almeida), to her hometown Florence, in the state of São Paulo, where the family gathers for Christmas and New Year.

In order to save her marriage, Lucia tries to please her husband by accepting his rages, encouraging his literary projects, and participating in his fantasies. Fernando wants to enjoy the end of the year by pursuing an old dream: to write a novel. In search of inspiration, he ends up finding Anita (Mel Lisboa), the ideal character for his novel.

Anita moves into a house where a crime of passion had occurred in the past. Anita lives in the most intense way, luring Fernando and awakening the first passion of Zezinho (Leonardo Miggiorin), a boy who lives across the way. Thus, she ends up forming a love triangle that forever changes the lives of everyone involved.

== Cast ==
- Mel Lisboa as Anita / Cíntia Ribeiro
- José Mayer as Fernando Reis (Nando)
- Helena Ranaldi as Lúcia Helena Reis
- Leonardo Miggiorin as José (Zezinho)
- Vera Holtz as Marta
- Carolina Kasting as Julieta
- Lineu Dias as Venancio
- Júlia Almeida as Luisa
- Taigu Nazareth as Andrés
- Clarisse Abujamra as Cecília
- Alexandre Barros as Hector Piña
- Daisy Braga as Claudia
- Walter Breda as Antonio
- Umberto Magnani as Eugênio
- Briani as Celeste

== International broadcasts ==
Peru - Panamericana Televisión - 2002

Chile - Televisión Nacional de Chile - 2003, 2006

Colombia - RCN Televisión - 2003

Dominican Republic - Teleantillas

Paraguay - Sistema Nacional de Televisión - 2004
