= Gata Velha Ainda Mia =

2013 film directed by Rafael Primot

- Theatrical release poster
- Directed by: Rafael Primot
- Written by: Rafael Primot
- Produced by: Rafael Primot
- Starring: Regina Duarte; Bárbara Paz; Gilda Nomacce
- Edited by: Dácio Pinheiro
- Production companies: Piloto Cinema e Televisão; Canal Brasil
- Distributed by: Polifilmes
- Release dates: October 2013 (Festival do Rio); 15 May 2014 (Brazil)
- Running time: 89 minutes
- Country: Brazil
- Language: Portuguese

Gata Velha Ainda Mia (English: Never Too Old to Meow) is a 2013 Brazilian drama thriller film written and directed by Rafael Primot and starring Regina Duarte, Bárbara Paz and Gilda Nomacce. The film showed as hors-concours at the 2013 Festival do Rio and showed at the LA Indie Film Fest.

== Plot ==
Gloria Polk (Regina Duarte) is a decadent bitter old writer, who decides at last to open her house to Carol (Bárbara Paz), a young journalist who lives in the same apartment building, and give her an interview about her return to literature after a long break. The film portrays a feminine drama which slowly becomes a thriller, with suspense and a surprising ending. The film talks about women and their difficulties concerning relationship, ageing and also writers' maddening creation process.

== Cast ==
- Regina Duarte as Gloria Polk
- Bárbara Paz as Carol
- Gilda Nomacce as Dida
