= Teatro Villa-Lobos =

Theater in Rio de Janeiro, Brazil

Villa-Lobos Theater
- Teatro Villa-Lobos

General information
- Architectural style: Modern
- Location: Rio de Janeiro, Rio de Janeiro, Brazil
- Coordinates: 22°57′39″S 43°10′30″W
- Inaugurated: March 8th, 1979

Other information
- Seating capacity: 463

The Villa-Lobos Theater (Portuguese: Teatro Villa-Lobos) is located in the Brazilian city of Rio de Janeiro. It opened in 1979 and belongs to the Anita Mantuano Foundation for the Arts of the State of Rio de Janeiro (Fundação Anita Mantuano de Artes do Estado do Rio de Janeiro - FUNARJ), which is linked to the Rio de Janeiro State Department of Culture (Secretaria Estadual de Cultura do Rio).

== History ==
=== Construction and inauguration ===
Located in Copacabana, the theater was designed by Raphael Matheus Peres, whose main concern was to adapt the structure to the site, located over an ocean interceptor. Financed by the Rio de Janeiro State Theater Foundation (Fundação Estadual de Teatros do Rio de Janeiro - Funterj) and conceived by Adolfo Bloch and Geraldo Matheus, construction began in 1978 and finished thirteen months later. It was named after maestro Heitor Villa-Lobos, one of the greatest composers in Brazilian history. It opened on March 8, 1979 with the play Pato com laranja, starring Paulo Autran and Marília Pêra, staged the following day. The house had three stage spaces: the main stage, the Monteiro Lobato room (Space II) and the Arnaldo Niskier room (Space III).

The building's facade consisted of concrete arcades, with marble and granite cladding on the inside. The risk of fire was reduced by installing fireproof coverings, such as synthetic velvet in the audience. A set of dressing rooms, three rehearsal rooms, a canteen for the artists, two kitchens, a doctor's office and a pharmacy were built in a four-storey block. It included a children's area whose main attraction was a puppet show created in a miniature room.

=== 1980s-1990s: Revitalization ===
After being closed for some time, the theater reopened in 1984 with a musical program in honor of the 25th anniversary of Villa-Lobos' death. It also announced the creation of a music room and two bars on the site to occupy the space. In 1987, it underwent conservation work coordinated by the same team responsible for the construction. In 1990, Ítalo Rossi assumed the management of the venue and, four years later, began a project to restore it.

=== 2010s-2020s: Renovation and fires ===
In 2010, the Villa-Lobos Theater underwent an extensive renovation. In April 2011, a fire broke out in the engine room, but was contained by the fire department and did not cause any major damage. Another fire broke out in September of the same year and destroyed the recently refurbished performance hall and stage. Three explosions from a transformer on the top floor are suspected to have caused the fire, which did not reach the point of compromising the building's structure.

In 2013, the Rio de Janeiro State Government announced the renovation of the theater, which had been closed since 2011. The project would cost R$36.7 million and included modernization and the creation of new performance areas. However, the work has not progressed. In 2023, the Anita Mantuano Foundation for the Arts of the State of Rio de Janeiro (Fundação Anita Mantuano de Artes do Estado do Rio de Janeiro - FUNARJ) announced the resumption of renovation, scheduled to begin in 2024.

== See also ==
- Municipal Theater of Rio de Janeiro
