= Sol de Verão =

- Genre: Telenovela
- Created by: Manoel Carlos
- Directed by: Roberto Talma; Jorge Fernando; Guel Arraes
- Starring: Irene Ravache; Jardel Filho; Tony Ramos; Débora Bloch; Cecil Thiré; Beatriz Segall; Yara Amaral; Paulo Figueiredo; Miguel Falabella
- Opening theme: "Tô que tô" by Simone
- Country of origin: Brazil
- Original language: Portuguese
- No. of episodes: 137

Production
- Running time: 50 minutes

Original release
- Network: Rede Globo
- Release: 11 October 1982 – 18 March 1983

Sol de Verão (The Summer Sun in English) is a Brazilian telenovela produced and broadcast by Rede Globo. It premiered on 11 October 1982 and ended on 18 March 1983. The death of lead actor Jardel Filho, when only 120 episodes out of the originally planned 155 were finished, caused the production to be cut short. The telenovela still ran for a further 17 chapters to wrap up the plot, for a total of 137 episodes. Since the telenovela that would succeed it in the timeslot, Louco Amor, hadn't yet begun production at that point, a truncated rerun of 1976's O Casarão was shown in the timeslot until Louco Amor's debut.

It was the twenty ninth "novela das oito" to be aired on the timeslot. It was created and written by Manoel Carlos and directed by Roberto Talma, Jorge Fernando and Guel Arraes.

== Cast ==
Actor	Character
Irene Ravache	Rachel
Jardel Filho	Heitor
Cecil Thiré	Virgílio
Gianfrancesco Guarnieri	Caetano
Beatriz Lyra	Irene
Tony Ramos	Abel
Débora Bloch	Clara
Carla Camurati	Olívia
Nelson Xavier	Zito
Beatriz Segall	Laura
Mário Gomes	Miguel
Yara Amaral	Sofia
Paulo Figueiredo	Horácio
Isabel Ribeiro	Flora
Miguel Falabella	Romeu
Mônica Torres	Mônica
Carlos Kroeber	Hilário
Maria Helena Pader	Irmã Luzia
Ivan Mesquita	Gilberto
Maria Alves	Matilde
Edson Silva	Gaspar
Ana Maria Sagres	Irmã Alzira
Duse Nacaratti	Madalena
Ísis de Oliveira	Beatriz
Helber Rangel	Germano
Camila Amado	Noêmia
Jorge Botelho	Tássio
Tânia Scher	Lola
Gésio Amadeu	Pedrinho
Márcia Rodrigues	Geni
Oberdan Júnior	Rogério
Monique Curi	Glorinha
