= Malu Mulher =

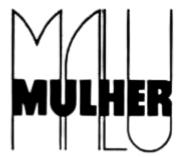
Malu Mulher logo

Malu Mulher is a TV series broadcast by Rede Globo from May 24, 1979 to December 22, 1980, written and directed by Daniel Filho. The theme song, Começar de novo, was a great hit in the voice of one of Brazil's greatest popular female singer, Simone.

== Plot ==
The premiere episode deals with Malu and Pedro Henrique's separation process, the fights, with physical and verbal aggression, the insecurity and fear of the couple's teenage daughter, Elisa, and the obvious disharmony in the home. The first year of the series shows Malu's departure from home, and her difficulties in trying to support herself, the new house and her daughter. In the second year, Malu is more mature and gets a permanent job at a research institute. A new phase begins, where she is ready to start her love life all over again.

== Censorship ==
Before the episodes were finished, there was a presentation of the Brazilian series to the press, in which Regina Duarte spoke about her character and female emancipation in Brazilian society. It was a risky interview, as it was not known whether the Federal Censorship would release Malu Mulher, Carga Pesada and Plantão de Polícia by the end of the presentation. In any case, the series ended up receiving their screening certificates. Author Walther Negrão says that he even wrote an episode that was vetoed by the Federal Censorship. In Malu, Rainha da Boca do Lixo, the sociologist was hired by an institute to carry out research into prostitution in São Paulo. She then disguised herself as a prostitute and went to Rua do Triunfo, where she ended up being arrested. The delegate, however, realized that she was an educated woman and feared that she was a journalist. At the time, one of the most talked about cases in the newspapers was that of a deputy who beat up prostitutes. The episode was subject to action by the Federal Censorship: initially vetoed, it was released, but not in time to be shown in the final season of Malu Mulher.

== Cast ==
Main roles

- Regina Duarte .... Malu
- Dennis Carvalho .... Pedro Henrique
- Narjara Turetta .... Elisa
- Antônio Petrin .... Gabriel Fonseca
- Sônia Guedes .... Elza
- Ricardo Petraglia .... Amorim
- Lúcia Alves .... Amorim's wife
- Ruthinéia de Moraes .... Vera
- Elza Gomes .... Alice
- Natália do Vale ....Malu's friend

Supporting roles

- Dina Sfat
- Mário Lago
- Lucélia Santos
- Ângela Leal
- Paulo Figueiredo
- Ney Latorraca

== International repercussions ==
Malu Mulher was broadcast to some 50 television channels in several countries. In 1979, it won the Ondas Award from the Spanish Broadcasting Society and Radio Barcelona. In 1980, he received the Iris Award for best foreign production shown on television in the United States. In the same year, it was broadcast in Sweden and exceeded in audience several BBC programmes in England. In 1982, it was considered the best television programme of the year in Portugal and Greece. The series continued to be exported even after it ended in Brazil. In Latin America, it faced problems with the censorship of some countries. In 1983, it went on air in Cuba. At the time, Brazilian entertainment productions for that country were still forbidden. In 1988, it was broadcast in France by Antenne 2 under the title Maria Lúcia. Regina Duarte won an award in the former Czechoslovakia for the episode "Parada Obrigatória". In the Netherlands, over one million viewers watched the first episode and about three million during six weeks.
