= Regina Duarte =

Brazilian actress (born 1947)

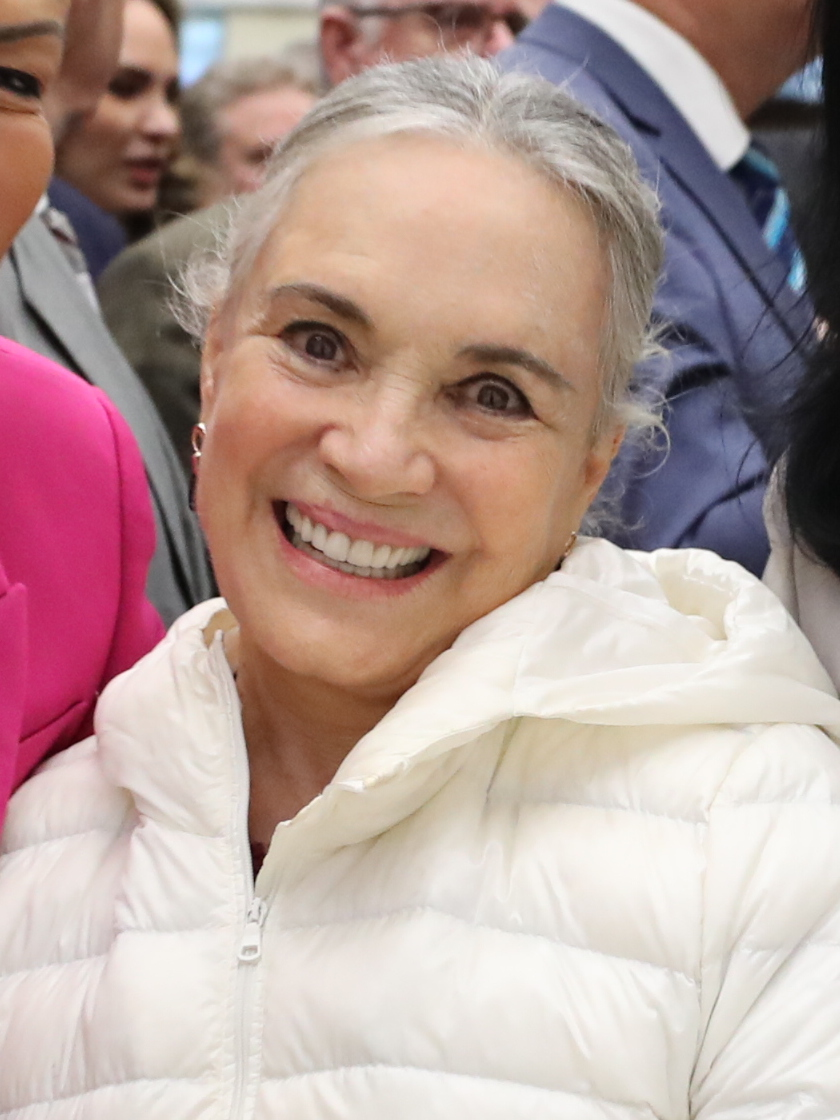
- Duarte in 2024

Special Secretary of Culture
- In office 4 March 2020 – 10 June 2020
- President: Jair Bolsonaro
- Minister: Marcelo Álvaro Antônio
- Preceded by: Roberto Alvim
- Succeeded by: Mário Frias

Personal details
- Born: Regina Blois Duarte; 5 February 1947 (age 79) Franca, São Paulo, Brazil
- Spouses: Marcos Flávio Franco Cunha (m. 1969; sep. 1975) Daniel Filho (m. 1978; div. 1979) Del Rangel (m. 1983; div. 1995) Eduardo Lippincott (m. 2002; div. 2019)
- Children: 3 (including Gabriela)
- Occupation: Actress
- Other names: A Namoradinha do Brasil ("Brazil's little girlfriend"); Regidu
- Years active: 1965–2018
- Employers: Rede Excelsior (1965–1969); Rede Globo (1969–2020)
- Notable work: Irmãos Coragem; Selva de Pedra; Sétimo Sentido; Roque Santeiro; Vale Tudo; Rainha da Sucata; Malu Mulher; História de Amor; Por Amor; Páginas da Vida

Regina Blois Duarte (born 5 February 1947) is a Brazilian actress who briefly served as Special Secretary of Culture, a cabinet position in President Jair Bolsonaro's federal administration, from March to May 2020.

== Political activities ==
Her efforts against former Brazilian president Luiz Inácio Lula da Silva (of the Workers' Party) in the 2002 elections caused considerable controversy. Duarte appeared in a TV advertisement saying that she was afraid of what could happen to Brazil if Lula won:

I'm afraid. It's been a long time since I had this feeling. Because I feel that Brazil in this election is at the risk of losing all the stability that has already been conquered.

She was also involved in the short-lived polemic organization Cansei.

=== Special Secretary of Culture ===
Following Roberto Alvim's controversy and subsequent removal from office in January 2020, Duarte was invited to be Special Secretary of Culture. At first, she did not accept the job, but on January 29, Duarte announced after a meeting that she had decided to accept the position. On March 4, 2020, she took office as the fourth Special Secretary of Culture in Jair Bolsonaro's government.

Duarte's time as secretary had no shortage of controversies, the most recent of which happened on May 7. During an interview with CNN Brazil, Duarte minimized the negative aspects of the Military dictatorship in Brazil, such as assassination and torture. When questioned by a fellow actress, Maitê Proença, about her plans to help artists during the COVID-19 pandemic, Duarte abruptly ended the interview.

On May 20, 2020, Bolsonaro posted a video to Twitter in which, alongside Duarte, he announces her transfer from Special Secretary of Culture to president of Cinemateca Brasileira, an institution in São Paulo responsible for the preservation of Brazilian audiovisual production. In the video, Duarte states that, while living in Brasília, she misses her family, and that a transfer to São Paulo would mean she could live with her relatives again. Her successor as Special Secretary of Culture was Mário Frias, who took office on June 23, 2020.

== Filmography ==
=== Television ===
Year	Title	Role	Notes
1965	A Deusa Vencida	Malu	
1965	A Grande Viagem	Isabel	
1966	As Minas de Prata	Inesita	
1966	Anjo Marcado	Lilian	
1967	Os Fantoches	Bete	
1968	Legião dos Esquecidos	Regina	
1968	O Terceiro Pecado	Carolina	
1969	Os Estranhos	Melissa	
1969	Dez Vidas	Pom Pom	
1969	Véu de Noiva	Andréa / Roberta / Maria Célia	
1970	Irmãos Coragem	Rita "Ritinha" de Cássia Maciel Coragem	
1971	Minha Doce Namorada	Patrícia	
1971; 1972	Caso Especial	Rosana; Leah ben Henie	Episode: "1"; Episode: "Dibuk (O Demônio)"
1972	Selva de Pedra	Simone Marques / Rosana Reis	
1973	Carinhoso	Cecília	
1974	Fogo sobre Terra	Bárbara	
1977	Despedida de Casado	Estela	
1977	Nina	Nina	
1979–80	Malu Mulher	Maria Lúcia "Malu" Fonseca	
1979	Mulher 80	Presenter	
1982	Sétimo Sentido	Luana Camará / Priscila Capricce	
1983	Guerra dos Sexos	Alma	
1984–85	Joana	Joana Martins	
1985	Roque Santeiro	Widow Porcina da Silva	
1986	Caso Especial	Eldest daughter of Negro Léo	Episode: "Negro Léo"
1988	Vale Tudo	Raquel Accioli	
1989	Top Model	Florinda Kundaro	
1990	Rainha da Sucata	Maria do Carmo Pereira	
1993	Retrato de Mulher	Various characters	
1994	Incidente em Antares	Shirley Terezinha	
1995	Irmãos Coragem	Scarlett O'Hara	
1995	História de Amor	Helena Soares	
1996	Visita de Natal	Girl with cold	Telefilm
1997–98	Por Amor	Helena Viana	
1999	Chiquinha Gonzaga	Chiquinha Gonzaga	
1999	O Belo e as Feras	Lídia	Episode: "Só o Amor Destrói"
2002	Desejos de Mulher	Andréa Vargas	
2003	Kubanacan	Maria Félix	7 episodes
2005	Sob Nova Direção	Dona Irene	Episódio "A Mensalista"
2006	Páginas da Vida	Helena Camargo Varela	
2008	Três Irmãs	Waldete Maria de Nascimento Bezerra / Verônica Ramos	
2010	Araguaia	Antoninha Rangel	2 episodes
2010	As Cariocas	Maria Elisa	Episodes: "A Adúltera da Urca"
2011	O Astro	Clotilde "Clô" Sampaio Hayalla	
2012	A Grande Família	Judge Noêmia	Episode: "Só Lineu Salva"
2014	Império	Maria Joaquina Braga	3 episodes
2015	Sete Vidas	Esther Viana	
2016	A Lei do Amor	Suzana Rivera	2 episodes
2017	Pega Pega	Herself	1 episode
2017	Tempo de Amar	Madame Lucerne / Catarina do Espírito Santo	

=== Film ===
Year	Title	Role	Notes
1968	Lance Maior	Cristina	
1969	A Compadecida	Mary, mother of Jesus	
1976	Chão Bruto	Sinhana	
1977	Parada 88, o Limite de Alerta	Ana	
1978	Daniel, Capanga de Deus	Beatriz / Sandra	
1981	El Hombre del Subsuelo	Luisa dos Santos	
1982	O Homem do Pau-Brasil	Lalá	
1983	O Cangaceiro Trapalhão	Aninha	
1984	São Bernardo	Madalena	Telefilm
1985	Happily Ever After	Fernanda	
1995	La Lona	Boxer	Short film
2000	Um Anjo Trapalhão	Girl with cold	
2012	Astro - Uma Fábula Urbana em um Rio de Janeiro Mágico	Neighbor	
2014	Gata Velha Ainda Mia	Glória Polk	
2018	As Herdeiras	Odilia	

== Stage ==
=== As actress ===
Year	Title	Role
1965	A Megera Domada	
1967	Black-Out	
1969	Romeu e Julieta	Julieta Capuleto
1971	Dom Quixote Mula Manca e seu Fiel Companheiro	
1975	Réveillon	Janete
1978	O Santo Inquérito	Branca Dias
1986	Miss Banana	Bela Vieira
1992	A Vida É Sonho	Segismundo
1999–01	Honra	Norah
2004–09	Coração Bazar	Various characters
2012–13	Raimunda, Raimunda	Raimunda
2013–16	Bem vindo-estranho	Jaki
2018	O Leão no Inverno	Eleanor da Aquitânia

=== As director ===
Year	Title
2012–13	Raimunda, Raimunda
2014	A Volta para Casa
2017–18	A Volta ao Lar

== Awards and nominations ==
Year	Awards	Category	Work nominated	Results	Ref.
1966	Troféu Imprensa	Best Female Newcomer	A Deusa Vencida	Won	
1968	Troféu Imprensa	Best Actress	Os Fantoches	Won	
1971	Troféu Imprensa	Best Actress	Irmãos Coragem	Won	
1971	Prêmio Globo	Best Actress	Minha Doce Namorada	Won	
1972	Troféu Imprensa	Best Actress	Minha Doce Namorada	Nominated	
1973	Troféu Imprensa	Best Actress	Selva de Pedra	Won	
1974	Troféu Imprensa	Best Actress	Carinhoso	Won	
1975	Troféu Imprensa	Best Actress	Fogo Sobre Terra	Nominated	
1976	Troféu Imprensa	Best Actress	Selva de Pedra	Nominated	
1979	Prêmio APCA	Best Actress	Malu Mulher	won	
1980	Prêmio APCA	Best Actress	Malu Mulher	won	
1985	Prêmio APCA	Best Actress	Roque Santeiro	won	
1986	Troféu Imprensa	Best Actress	Roque Santeiro	won	
1987	Troféu Imprensa	Best Actress	Roque Santeiro	Nominated	
1989	Troféu Imprensa	Best Actress	Vale Tudo	Nominated	
1991	Troféu Imprensa	Best Actress	Rainha da Sucata	Nominated	
1996	Troféu Imprensa	Best Actress	História de Amor	Nominated	
1998	Troféu Imprensa	Best Actress	Por Amor	Nominated	
1998	Prêmio Contigo! de TV	Set of Work		won	
2002	Prêmio Qualidade Profissional	Set of Work		won	
2003	Prêmio Contigo! de TV	Best Actress	Desejos de Mulher	Nominated	
2003	Prêmio Contigo! de TV	Best Romantic Couple	Desejos de Mulher	Nominated	
2006	Prêmio IstoÉ Gente	Set of Work		Won	
2011	Prêmio Quem de Televisão	Best Actress	O Astro	Nominated	
2011	Prêmio Qualidade Brasil	Best Supporting Actress	O Astro	Nominated	
2011	Prêmio Melhores da Revista da TV - O Globo	Best Actress	O Astro	Won	
2011	Prêmio TV Press	Best Actress	O Astro	Won	
2011	Troféu Mário Lago	Set of Work		won	
2014	LA Indie Film Fest	Best Actress	Gata Velha Ainda Mia	won	
2015	Prêmio Guarani de Cinema Brasileiro	Best Actress	Gata Velha Ainda Mia	Nominated	
2015	Prêmio Extra de Televisão	Best Supporting Actress	Sete Vidas	Nominated	
2018	Prêmio Shell de Teatro	Best Actress	O Leão no Inverno	Nominated	

Awards
APCA Awards
Preceded by Fernanda Montenegro	APCA Awards for Best Actress in Television; 1980; 1985	Succeeded by Fernanda Montenegro; Lílian Lemmertz
Preceded by Débora Duarte	APCA Awards for Best Actress in Television; 1980; 1985	Succeeded by Marília Pêra
Troféu Imprensa
Preceded by Débora Duarte	Troféu Imprensa for Best Actress; 1971; 1973–1974	Succeeded by Marília Pêra
Preceded by Marília Pêra	Troféu Imprensa for Best Actress; 1971; 1973–1974	Succeeded by Dina Sfat
Political offices
Preceded by Roberto Alvim	Special Secretary of Culture; 2020	Succeeded by Mário Frias
