= Leonardo Miggiorin =

Brazilian actor, musician and psychologist (born 1982)

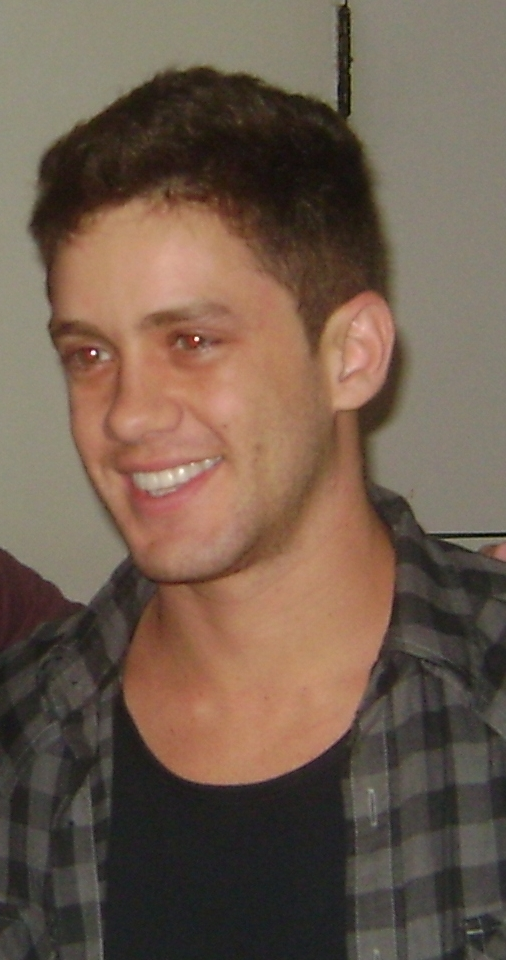
- Miggiorin in 2011
- Born: Leonardo Moreira Miggiorin; 17 January 1982 (age 44); Barbacena, Minas Gerais, Brazil
- Occupations: actor; musician; psychologist
- Years active: 1999–present
- Partner: João Victor Amado (2022–present)

Leonardo Miggiorin (born 17 January 1982) is a Brazilian actor, musician, and psychologist.

== Biography ==
Miggiorin was born on 17 January 1982 in Barbacena, in the state of Minas Gerais. His father was a member of the Brazilian Air Force, which made his family move frequently. As a result, Miggiorin lived in Brasília and São Paulo. He began with theater at the age of 12, and went on to study arts and dancing in Curitiba, in the state of Paraná. He started his acting career on Brazilian television in 1999 as part of a young cast. Miggiorin later studied psychology, graduating in 2015 and founding his own private clinic in São Paulo.

Aside from his acting career, Miggiorin was part of a music band between 2006 and 2013, which came as a direct result of a character that he portrayed in a soap opera. His musical and acting career also took him to the United States before permanently settling in Rio de Janeiro.

Miggiorin is openly gay. He currently dates producer João Victor Amado.

== Selected credits ==
The following are some of Miggiorin's cast roles.

Year	Title	Role
1999–2000	Flora Encantada	Gafa
2001	Presença de Anita	Zezinho
2003	Mulheres Apaixonadas	Rodrigo Andrade de Melo
2004	Senhora do Destino	Shao Lin
2005	Essas Mulheres	Pedro Lemos Camargo
2006	Cobras & Lagartos	Tomás Pasquim Montini
2007	Sob Nova Direção	Apolo
2008	Toma Lá, Dá Cá	Dirceuzinho
2009	Viver a Vida	Flávio Vilela (Flavinho)
2012	Malhação	Leandro Maciel
2025	Beleza Fatal	Rafuda

== Awards and nominations ==
Year	Award	Category	Work	Result	Ref.
2002	Prêmio Contigo! de TV	Best revealing actor	Presença de Anita	Nominated	
2002	Festival de Cinema de Gramado	Best actor	Em Nome do Pai	Won	
2003	Prêmio Jovem Brasileiro	Best actor	Mulheres Apaixonadas	Won	
2005	Troféu Top of Business	Revealing actor of the year	Senhora do Destino	Won	
2008	Prêmio Magnífico	Revelation of the year		Won	
2009	Cine PE - Festival do Audiovisual	Best supporting actor	Mistéryos	Won	
2011	Prêmio Jovem Brasileiro	Best supporting actor	Insensato Coração	Won	
2021	Prêmio Bibi Ferreira	Best supporting actor	O Ovo de Ouro	Nominated	
