= Desejos de Mulher =

2002 Brazilian telenovela

- Genre: Telenovela
- Created by: Euclydes Marinho
- Directed by: Dennis Carvalho; José Luiz Villamarim
- Starring: Regina Duarte; Alessandra Negrini; Glória Pires; Eduardo Moscovis; Herson Capri; José de Abreu; Cássio Gabus Mendes; José Wilker; Mel Lisboa; Renata Sorrah; Deborah Evelyn; Paulo Betti; Drica Moraes; Daniel Del Sarto; Regiane Alves; Sílvia Pfeifer; Evandro Mesquita; Chris Couto; Otávio Müller; Vera Holtz
- Opening theme: "Façamos"
- Composers: Chico Buarque and Elza Soares
- Country of origin: Brazil
- Original language: Portuguese
- No. of episodes: 185

Production
- Running time: 50 minutes

Original release
- Network: TV Globo
- Release: January 21 – August 24, 2002

Related
- As Filhas da Mãe; O Beijo do Vampiro

Desejos de Mulher is a Brazilian telenovela that was produced and aired by TV Globo from January 21, 2002, to August 24, 2002, totaling 185 chapters, replacing As Filhas da Mãe and replaced by O Beijo do Vampiro.

It stars Regina Duarte, Glória Pires, Eduardo Moscovis, Herson Capri, Alessandra Negrini and José de Abreu as the main characters of the plot. Freely based on the book Fashionably Late from Olivia Goldsmith.

== Plot ==
Andréa Vargas (Regina Duarte) is an internationally renowned fashion designer whose life is torn apart when her sister, Júlia, discovers and reveals to her that she is not Atilio and Mercedes' biological daughter, on the day she was going to receive the biggest award of her career. Júlia appears to be a good person, but harbors a great deal of bitterness towards her sister, since in their youth they fell in love with the same boy, Diogo. The boy went his separate way in life, misunderstood by Andréa, but many years later is back, ready to regain his love.

Andrea, the eldest, dedicated herself to her professional life and is a famous stylist, owner of an important and influential brand in the Brazilian fashion world. Despite the large shock to have spent her whole life without knowing her real mother, Andréa has another problem. Her husband, Bruno (José de Abreu), manager of his own company, has a lover, Selma (Alessandra Negrini), and is not at all reliable. The two plan to get hold of all of Ándrea's assets and branding. In reality Selma is most interested in the demoralization of Andréa. Jealous and envious, Selma has a reason: she's her sister, daughter of Isaura, the mother who never met Andréa.

Julia is married to Renato Moreno (Cassio Gabus), a businessman who seems above suspicion. At the beginning of the story, he finds himself involved in a counterfeiting scandal and is arrested. Julia's struggle to prove her husband's innocence drives her back into the profession to support the household. In the struggle to clear him and his entire family is the reporter Chico Maia, with whom Julia gets involved.

There is also the subplot of Ariel. The beauty Virginia, played by Silvia Pfeifer, decides to turn him into a target of harassment. The problem is that Ariel is an openly gay man, who has lived with his partner Tadeu (Otávio Muller) for years. The two spend cozy evenings watching Barbra Streisand movies.

== Cast ==
Actor	Character
Regina Duarte	Andréia Vargas
Alessandra Negrini	Selma Dumont (Selminha/Karen/Vânia)
Herson Capri	Diogo Valente
José de Abreu	Bruno Vargas
Glória Pires	Júlia Moreno
Eduardo Moscovis	Francisco "Chico" Maia
Cássio Gabus Mendes	Renato Moreno
Drica Moraes	Gilda
Mel Lisboa	Gabriela Diniz
Regiane Alves	Letícia Miranda Moreno
Daniel Del Sarto	Nicolau Toledo Valente
Deborah Evelyn	Fernanda Monteiro Maia
José Wilker	Ariel Britz
Vera Holtz	Bárbara Toledo
Sílvia Pfeifer	Virgínia
Otávio Müller	Tadeu Borges
Renata Sorrah	Rachel Vonnegut
Hugo Carvana	Atílio Miranda
Miriam Pires	Isaura
Luiza Mariani	Xana
Evandro Mesquita	Bill
Rosi Campos	Marlene Motta
Vanessa Gerbelli	Gongon (Gonçala)
Paulo Betti	Alexandre Müller (Alex)
Mariana Lima	Antônia Donaggio
João Camargo	Afrânio
Walderez de Barros	Judite Moreno
Alice Borges	Frida
Nathália Rodrigues	Patrícia "Paty" Vonnegut Britz
Amélia Bittencourt	Mercedes Miranda
Bernardo Marinho	Bernardo Miranda Moreno
Nelson Dantas	Ubaldo Moreno
Betty Gofman	Nair
Stepan Nercessian	Apolinário
Tonico Pereira	Kléber
Chris Couto	Sophie
Roberto Bataglin	Gianni
Ada Chaseliov	Luíza
Cassiano Carneiro	Hélio Roque
Pedro Brício	Juca
David Herman	Mr. David
Cristina Amadeo	Meire
Thereza Piffer	Euzeni
Bruno Bezerra	Pirulito
Juliana Didone	Tati
Joana Motta	Olívia
Rocco Pitanga	Joaquim
Rodrigo Hilbert	Pablo
Marcelo Laham	Vavá
Paulo Vespúcio	Xavier
Márcio Kieling	Beto
Aline Aguiar	Camila
Sérgio Rufino	Cristiano
