= Djenane Machado =

Brazilian actress (1951–2022)

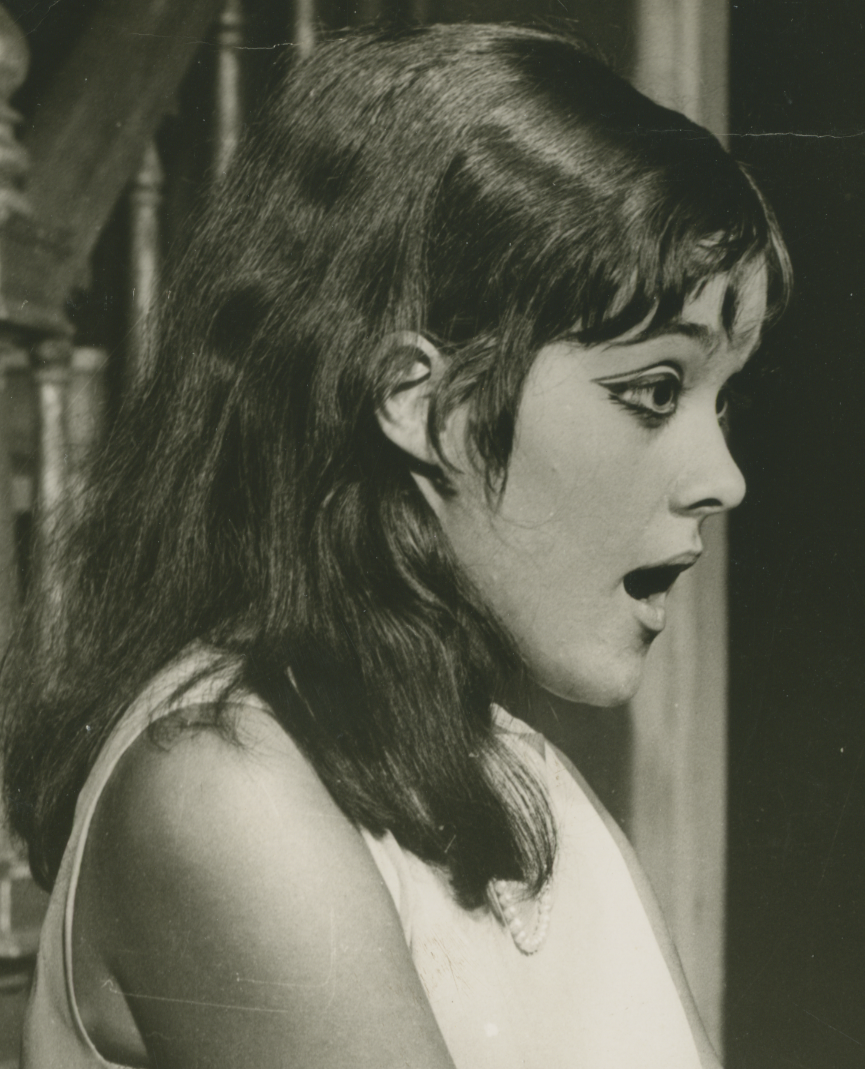
- Machado on stage (1967)
- Born: 10 June 1951; Rio de Janeiro, Brazil
- Died: 23 March 2022 (aged 70); Rio de Janeiro, Brazil
- Occupation: Actress

Djenane Machado (10 June 1951 – 23 March 2022) was a Brazilian actress.

== Life and career ==
Born in Rio de Janeiro, the daughter of an impresario and of a costume designer, Machado began her career as a child actress taking part in a stage adaptation of The Sound of Music, and at 17 she made her television debut in the telenovela Passo dos Ventos. Her breakout role was Branca in the 1969 telenovela A Ponte dos Suspiros, and the same year she made her film debut in A Penúltima Donzela.

Machado continued working in numerous Rede Globo telenovelas until the early 1980s, when she started appearing in several Rede Manchete and TV Cultura series. Married and divorced twice, in 1992 after the death of her father she retired from showbusiness and disappeared from the public scene. Machado died on 23 March 2022, at the age of 70.
