= Meu Pé de Laranja Lima (disambiguation) =

Meu Pé de Laranja Lima is a 1968 novel by José Mauro de Vasconcelos.

Meu Pé de Laranja Lima may also refer to:

- Meu Pé de Laranja Lima (film), the 1970 film adaptation of the nove
- Meu Pé de Laranja Lima, also known as My Sweet Orange Tree, the 2012 film adaptation of the novel
- Meu Pé de Laranja Lima (TV series), the 1998 telenovela adaptation of the novel
- O Meu Pé de Laranja Lima (1970 TV series), a telenovela adaptation of the novel
- O Meu Pé de Laranja Lima (1980 TV series), a telenovela adaptation of the novel
