= Chediak =

Chediak is a surname. Notable people with the surname include:

- Almir Chediak (1950–2003), Brazilian musical producer, entrepreneur, publisher, guitarist, teacher, composer, writer and researcher
- Braz Chediak (born 1942), Brazilian actor, screenwriter and filmmaker
- Enrique Chediak (born 1967), Ecuadorian cinematographer
- Jesus Chediak (d. 2020), Brazilian film producer and theatre director
- Jorge Chediak (born 1951), Uruguayan lawyer and judge
