= List of programs broadcast by Rede Bandeirantes =

This is a list of programs broadcast by Rede Bandeirantes (also known as "Band"), a Brazilian television network. Part of the Bandeirantes Group, it aired for the first time in 1967. Currently it is the fourth TV network in Brazil by the ratings.

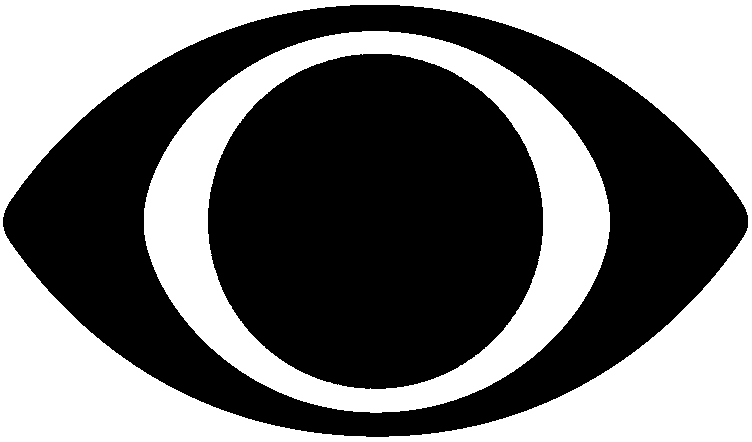

== Current programs ==
=== Dramaturgy ===
Title	Run
Guerra das Rosas	2026–present
Café com Aroma de Mulher	2026–present

=== Series ===
Title	Run
The Blacklist	2021–present

=== Reality shows ===
Title	Presenter	Run
MasterChef Brasil	Helena Rizzo; Érick Jacquin; Henrique Fogaça	2014–present
MasterChef Junior	Helena Rizzo; Érick Jacquin; Henrique Fogaça	2015, 2022–present
MasterChef Profissionais	Helena Rizzo; Érick Jacquin; Henrique Fogaça	2016–2018, 2022–present
MasterChef +	Helena Rizzo; Érick Jacquin; Henrique Fogaça	2022–present
Largados e Pelados	—N/a	2021-2022, 2023-present
Pesadelo na Cozinha	Érick Jacquin	2017, 2019, 2021, 2015-present
Mestres do Drywall	André Vasco	2025-present

=== Variety ===
Title	Presenter	Run
Melhor da Tarde	Chris Flores; João Paulo Vergueiro; Léo Dias	2001-2005, 2018-presente
Chama no Privé	—N/a	2022-present
Perrengue na Band	Tatola Godas; Denys Motta; Ângelo Campos; Ricardinho Mendonça	2021-present
Jantar o Quê?*	Larissa Januário	2024-present
Estilo Arte 1*	variety	2025-present

- Rerun of Sabor & Arte.
- Rerun of Arte 1.

=== News and information ===
Title	Main Hosts	Run
Jornal da Band	Eduardo Oinegue; Adriana Araújo	1977–present
Canal Livre	Rodolfo Schneider	1980–present
Jornal da Noite	Felipe Vieira; Thaís Dias	1982–1988, 1989-present
Brasil Urgente	Joel Datena	2001–present
Band Cidade (Note: From 6:50 pm until 7:20 pm, the programming space is intended for local programming of its own and affiliated broadcasters, except for the coverage region in São Paulo.)	—N/a Regional program	1999-present
Jornal BandNews (Note: From 6:45 am until 7:00 am, in network with BandNews TV.)	Thalyta Almeida	2015-2020; 2024-present
+Info	—N/a	2018-present
Bora Praça (Note: Form 6:00 am until 8:00 am, the programming space is intended for local programming of its own and affiliated broadcasters.)	—N/a Regional program	2019-present
Bora Brasil	Cynthia Martins; Felipeh Campos; Patrícia Rocha	2020-present
Linha de Combate	João Paulo Vergueiro	2020-presente
Documento Band	—N/a	2020, 2023-present
Planeta Selvagem	—N/a	2021-present
Economia pra Você*	Juliana Rosa	2025-present

- Rerun of BandNews TV.

=== Sports ===
==== Programming ====
Title	Main Hosts	Run
Jogo Aberto	Renata Fan	2007–present
Show do Esporte	Elia Junior; Glenda Kozlowski	1983-2004, 2018, 2020-present
Os Donos da Bola*	—N/a Regional program	2012–present
Esporte Total*	Fernando Fernandes	1986-2007, 2021-present
Band Esporte Clube	Kalinka Schütel	2007-2020, 2021-present
Fórmula Band*	Kalinka Schütel	2024-present
Você Torceu Aqui	Fernando Fernandes	2020-present
Band Esporte	—N/a	1994-2000, 2023-present
Resenha do Galinho*	Zico	2024-present
Alma de Gigante*	—N/a	2025-present

- Rerun of Fish TV.

==== Coverage ====
Football

- Campeonato Brasileiro Série C (2019-2022, 2025-present)
- Saudi Pro League (2023–present)**

Motorsports

- IndyCar Series (1996–2001, 2004-2020, 2026–present)
- Stock Car Brasil (1994-1999, 2020–present)**
- Porsche Cup Brasil (2014-2018, 2021-present)**
- Copa Truck (2021–present)**
- Formula E (2023–present)*
- TCR South America Touring Car Championship (2024–present)**
- FIA World Endurance Championship (2024–present)**

Combat Sports

- Standout Fighting Tournament (2018–present)*
- Brazilian Wrestling Federation (2024–present)*

*(also aired on BandSports)

**(aired on both BandSports, in their website and YouTube channel)

=== Special ===
- Band Folia (Brazilian Carnival coverage) (1999–present)
- Festival da Virada (1996-present)
- Natal Feliz (2019-present)
- Verão Maior Paraná (2024-present)

=== Children's programming ===
- Band Kids (2000–present)

=== Movie blocks ===
- Cinema na Madrugada (1979–present)
- Sessão Especial (1978–present)
- Cine Privé (1995-2010, 2019-present)
- Sábado no Cinema (2026-present)
- Domingo no Cinema (1996-present)
- Estação Cinema (2020-present)
- Cine Clube (2009-present)

== Former programs ==
=== Late night ===
- Agora É Tarde (2011–2015)
- Amaury Jr. (1996-1997, but in the morning; 2018-2019)
- A Noite é uma Criança (2002-2011, there was too an A Noite é uma Super Criança, in the night saturdays, in between 2009 and 2011)
- Circulando (1996-1997)
- Claquete (2011–2013)
- Comando da Madrugada (1983-1985; 2002-2007)
- Flash (1983-2001)

=== Variety ===
- Agora é Domingo (before, Agora é com Datena and also Brasil da Gente) (2018)
- A Grande Chance (2007-2008)
- Além, Muito Além do Além (1967-1968)
- Aqui na Band (2019-2020)
- Atualíssima (2007-2009)
- Bem Família (2005-2009)
- Boa Noite Brasil (1982-1985, 2003-2007)
- Bom Apetite (1999-2000)
- Buzina do Chacrinha (1978-1982)
- Caravela da Saudade (1980-1983)
- Clipmania (2001-2004)
- Clodovil (1983)
- Clodovil Soft (1998)
- Clube do Bolinha (1974-1994)
- Conversa de Gente Grande (2012)
- Cozinha Maravilhosa da Ofélia (1968-1998)
- Cozinha do Bork (2018)
- CQC (2008-2015)
- De Olho nas Estrelas (2004-2007)
- Descontrole (after, Sob Controle) (2002)
- Dia Dia (1987-2005, 2009-2018)
- Discoteca do Chacrinha (1978-1982)
- Ela (1985-1987)
- É Verdade ou é Mentira? (2007)
- Falcão na Contramão (1998-1999)
- Faustão na Band (2022-2023)
- G4 Brasil (2003-2004)
- H (1996-2000)
- Homenagem ao Artista (2007-2008)
- Hora da Verdade (2001-2005)
- Jogo Aberto com Marta Suplicy (1999)
- Jogo da Vida (2003-2005)
- Mais Geek (2020-2021)
- Manhã Mulher (1998-1999)
- Márcia (2005-2010)
- Melhor da Noite (2023-2026)
- Memória Band (1996-1997; 2000)
- Muito+ (2012)
- Mulheres do Brasil (1998-1999)
- O Formigueiro (2010)
- Pânico na Band (2012-2017)
- Paulo Lopes na TV (1999-2000)
- Perdidos na Noite (1986-1988)
- Popcorn TV (2010)
- Pra Valer (2005-2007)
- Programa do João (2023-2025)
- Programa Jota Silvestre (1983-1987)
- Programa Olga Bongiovanni (1999-2001)
- Programa Raul Gil (2006-2010)
- Programa Silvia Poppovic (1992-2001)
- Raul Gil Tamanho Família (2008-2009)
- Receita Minuto (2009 -2009
- Sabadaço (2002-2007)
- Sabadão de Todos (2024-2026)
- Safenados e Safadinhos (1987-1988)
- Sobcontrole (2002-2003)
- Superpoderosas (2018)
- Superpositivo (also O Positivo) (2000-2001)
- Tagarelas (2000)
- Terceira Visão (1987-1989)
- Terra Nativa (2007-2009)
- The Chef (2020-2024)
- Toda Sexta (2009-2010)
- Viagens ao Redor do Mundo (2018-2020)
- Video News (2009-2012, 2018)
- Warner Play (2022-2023)
- Xênia e Você (1984-1987)
- Zoo (2013–2015)

=== News ===
- Ação e Investimento (1984-1987)
- Acontece (1990-1999, 2012)
- Agrojornal (1989-1992)
- A Liga (2010-2016)
- Band Economia (1999-2000)
- Band Notícia (1999-2001)
- Band Notícias (2019-2021)
- Bandeira 1 (1987-1990)
- Boa Tarde (2007 -2010)
- Brasil Hoje (1986-1988)
- Café com Jornal (2014-2020)
- Cara a Cara (1986-1994)
- Dia a Dia News (1997-2001)
- Dia D (1986-1989)
- Diário Rural (1994-2001)
- Dinheiro (1986-1989)
- Documento Especial (1998-1999)
- Domingo com Márcia (2001-2002)
- Entrevista Coletiva (1992-1997)
- Fatos de Domingo (2001)
- Fogo Cruzado (1997-1999)
- Força Verde (1986-1990)
- Jornal de Domingo (1993-1997)
- Na Linha de Frente (1997-2001, 2020)
- Notícias de Domingo (2000-2001)
- Primeiro Jornal (2005 -2008
- Raio-X (2001-2002)
- Realidade (1999-2000)
- Realidade Rural (1991-1992)
- Rede Cidade (1993-1998)
- Tempo Quente (1998)
- Titulares da Notícia (1967-1977)
- TV Informátika (1983-1985)
- TV Trânsito (2009)

=== Sports ===
- Auto Mais (2012-2016)
- Apito Final (1986-1999 2002, 2006, 2009-2010 2023-2026)
- Band Clássicos (2011-2012)
- Band Mania (2010-2011, 2013)
- Bandeirantes Esporte (1980-1983)
- Bola no Chão (2007)
- Bola na Mesa (1980-1982)
- Desafio (1986-1991)
- Deu Olé (2012–2013)
- Esporte Agora (2000-2002)
- Esporte Total na Geral (2005)
- Faixa Especial do Esporte (1992-1997)
- Faixa Nobre do Esporte (1991-1998)
- Futebol Compacto (2007-2009)
- Galvão e Amigos (2025)
- Gol: O Grande Momento do Futebol (1983–2004; 2009-2016)
- Magazine da Liga (2005-2006; 2009-2018)
- O Melhor da Liga (2005-2006; 2009-2018)
- O Melhor do UFC (2023-2024)
- Por Dentro da Bola (2007) 2008
- Show de Bola (2004)
- Super Domingo Esportivo (1980-1983)
- Super Técnico (1999-2001)
- Terceiro Tempo (2008-2023)
- The Ultimate Fighter (2023-2024)
- Valle Tudo (1990-1996)
- Vídeo Gol (2004-2005)

==== Coverage ====
- FIFA Confederations Cup (tournament abolished after the end of 2017)
- Campeonato Carioca (1977–1983, 1991–1999, 2009–2016, 2023)
- UEFA Champions League (1989-1990; 2005-2006; 2009-2018)
- UEFA Europa League (2024-2025)
- Intercontinental Cup (1985-1993)
- FIFA Club World Cup (2000, 2009, 2012-2013, 2022)
- Copa do Brasil (1989, 1999-2000, 2007-2013, 2015)
- Brazilian Soccer Championship A-Series (1967-1985, 1989-1999, 2007-2015)
- Campeonato Brasileiro Série B (1992, 1997, 2011-2013, 2023-2024)
- Soccer States championships (1967-1999, 2007-2016)
- Copa Libertadores (1976, 1993, 1995, 2000-2001, 2008)
- Copa Sudamericana (2007-2012)
- Copa Mercosur (1999-2001)
- CART/Indy Car World Series (1984-1992)
- Formula One (1980, 2021–2025)
- Formula 2 (2022–2025)
- Formula 3 (2023–2025)
- MotoGP (1993-1996)
- FIVB Volleyball World League (1991-1996, 2015)
- FIVB Volleyball World Grand Prix (1993-1996, 2015)
- Volleyball World Championship (1986-1994, 2010)
- FIFA World Cup (1986, 1990, 1994, 1998, 2010 and 2014)
- UEFA Euro (1996, 2012, 2016)
- Summer Olympics (1980, 1984, 1988, 1992, 1996, 2000, 2004, 2008 and 2016)
- Winter Olympics (1994, 1998, 2002, 2014)
- Fórmula Truck (2000-2003, 2006-2017)
- Campeonato Sudamericano de GT (2012-2013)
- Campeonato Brasileiro de Turismo (2013-2014)
- Top Series (2013)
- Novo Basquete Brasil (2002, 2016–2019)
- Serie A (1983-2001, 2006-2010, 2020-2021)
- Premier League (1991-1992; 2004-2008)
- La Liga (1994-2003, 2004-2006)
- Russian Premier League (2020-2022)
- Campeonato Brasileiro Sub-20 (2019-2021)
- Campeonato Brasileiro de Aspirantes (2020-2021, was never shown)
- Copa do Brasil Sub-20 (2020-2021)
- Campeonato Brasileiro de Futebol Feminino (1997; 2019-2022)
- Bundesliga (2020-2023)
- National Basketball Association (1987-2001, 2019-2023)
- National Football League (1987-1995)
- NASCAR Cup Series (2023-2024)
- NASCAR Xfinity Series (2023-2024)
- NASCAR Craftsman Truck Series (2023-2024)
- UFC (2023-2024), between others

=== Special ===
- Band Verão (2001-2010)
- Parintins Folklore Festival (2008–2014)
- Miss Brasil (2003–2019)
- Miss Universe (2003–2018)
- Verão Vivo (1987-2000)

=== Reality shows/Game shows ===
- Desafio em Dose Dupla Brasil (Dual Survival) (2022)
- Largados e Pelados: A Tribo (Naked and Afraid) (2021-2022)
- A Fuga (Raid the Cage) (2018)
- O Sócio (The Profit) (2018)
- Exathlon Brasil (Exathlon) (2017)
- Polícia 24h (COPS) (2010-2017)
- 1001 Perguntas (2022)
- Bar Aberto (2020)
- À Primeira Vista (First Dates) (2017)
- X Factor Brasil (2016)
- Shark Tank Brasil - Negociando com Tubarões (Shark Tank) (2016-2017)
- Bate & Volta (2016)
- Sabe ou Não Sabe (2014-2015)
- Quem Fica em Pé? (Who's Still Standing?) (2012-2013)
- Mulheres Ricas (The Real Housewives) (2012-2013)
- Perdidos na Tribo (Ticket To The Tribes) (2012)
- Projeto Fashion (Project Runway) (2011)
- The Phone – A Missão (The Phone) (2011)
- É Tudo Improviso (Whose Line Is It Anyway?) (2010-2011)
- Busão do Brasil (The Bus) (2010)
- E24 (Medical reality show) (2009-2012)
- Zero Bala (2009-2010)
- É o Amor (All You Need Is Love) (2008)
- A Grande Chance (The Alphabet Game) (2007-2008)
- Quem Pode mais? (Battle of the sexes game show) (2008)
- Cidade Nota 10 (City vs City) (2005)
- Joga Bonito (2006)
- Joga 10 (2005)
- Na Pressão (2004)
- Sobcontrole (2002-2003)
- Território Livre (2000-2001)
- Surpresa e 1/2 (2000)
- Supermarket (Supermarket Sweep) (1990-1998)

=== Mood ===
- Agildo no País das Maravilhas (1987-1988)
- Bronco (1987-1990)
- É Tudo Improviso (2010-2011; 2019)
- Praça Brasil (1987-1989)
- Só Riso na Praça (1989)
- Só Risos (2015-2019)
- Uma Escolinha Muito Louca (2008-2010; 2019)

=== Children's programming ===
- Sítio do Picapau Amarelo (1967–1969)
- A Turma do Lambe-Lambe (1977-1986)
- Show de Desenhos (1978-1983; 2013-2014)
- Boa Noite, Amiguinhos (1983-1984)
- TV Tutti-Frutti (1983-1984)
- TV Criança (1984-1987; 1990-1991)
- ZYB Bom (1987-1988)
- TV Fofão (1986-1989; 1996-1997)
- Circo da Alegria (1989-1990)
- Estação Criança (1996)
- É o Bicho (1999-2000)
- Oficina do Daniel Azulay (1996-2000)
- Pic Nick Band (2006)
- Mundo Animado (2018–2020)

=== Movie blocks ===
- Carlton Cine (1988-1995)
- Cine+ (2018-2021)
- Cine Ação (2020-2021)
- Cine Band (1996-2006, 2016-2021)
- Cine Chevrolet (1995-1996)
- Cine Clube Banco do Brasil (1992-1994)
- Cine Show (1996-1998)
- Cine Star (1997-1998)
- Cinema Cinco Estrelas (1995-1998)
- Cinema Com Carinho (1997)
- Cinema Dez (1984-1988)
- Força Total (1992-1998)
- Gatos e Corujas/Gatas e Corujas (1999-2001)
- Primeira Sessão (1999-2000)
- Quarta Espetacular (1980-1981; 1989-1990; 2008)
- Sábado em Hollywood (1981-1982; 1998-2000)
- Sala Brasil de Cinema (2001-2002)
- Segunda Sem Lei (1979-1987; 1990-1992)
- Sessão Livre (1992–2020)
- Sexta Sexy (1993-1995)
- Supersessão Philco (1981-1998)
- Telefilme (2000-2001)
- Terça Máxima (1986-1987; 1990-1992)
- Terça Sem Lei (1989)
- Top Cine (2007-2021)

=== Dramaturgy ===
- Abigail
- A Deusa Vencida
- A Filha do Silêncio
- Água na Boca
- A Idade da Loba
- A Moça do Sobrado Grande
- Amor Proibido
- Asas do Amor
- Belas e Intrépidas
- Beleza Fatal
- Braço de Ferro
- Caminhos do Amor
- Café com Aroma de Mulher
- Campeão (novel of 1980)
- Cara a Cara
- Casi Ángeles
- Cavalo Amarelo
- Cruel Istambul
- Dance Dance Dance
- Desencontros
- Dulcinéa Vai a Guerra
- Era Preciso Voltar
- Ezel
- Fatmagül: A Força do Amor
- Floribella
- Isa TKM
- Isa TK+
- Maçã do Amor
- Maria Celeste
- Meu Pé de Laranja Lima
- Mil e uma Noites
- Minha Vida
- Morangos com Açúcar
- Nazaré
- Ninho da Serpente
- Nunca é Tarde Demais
- O Bolha
- O Campeão (novel of 1996)
- O Meu Pe de Laranja Lima
- O Todo Poderoso
- Olhos de Água
- Os Adolescentes
- Os Imigrantes (had a variant call of Os Imigrantes - Terceira Geração)
- Os Miseráveis
- Ouro Verde
- Paixões Proibidas
- Pé de Vento
- Perdidos de Amor
- Renúncia
- Ricardinho: Sou Criança, Quero Viver
- Rosa Baiana
- Rosario
- Sabor de Mel
- Serras Azuis
- Sila: Prisioneira do Amor
- Sombras do Passado
- Traição
- Um Homem Muito Especial
- Valor da Vida
- Violetta

=== Series ===
- A Guerra dos Pintos
- Além, Muito Além do Além
- ALF
- Ally McBeal
- As Aventuras de Tiazinha
- As Aventuras do Homem Cueca
- Bronco
- Capitães de Areia
- Carne de Sol
- Casa de Irene
- Casal 80
- Chapadão do Bugre
- Colônia Cecília
- Como eu conheci sua mãe
- Confissões de Adolescente
- Contos de Natal
- Desjuntados
- Era uma Vez uma História
- Glee
- Haru e Natsu: As cartas que não chegaram
- Julie e os Fantasmas
- Manhãs de Setembro
- Mr. Bean
- Nóis na Firma
- O Cometa
- Orange Is The New Black
- Os Anjos do Sexo
- Outlander
- Santo de Casa
- Terminadores
- Tô Frito
- Vikings

== Upcoming programs ==
- Romaria (2025)
- Dossiê Celebridade (18 November 2026)
