= Meu Pé de Laranja Lima =

Novel by José Mauro de Vasconcelos

Meu Pé de Laranja Lima (English: My Sweet Orange Tree) is a novel by José Mauro de Vasconcelos. The book was first published in 1968 and was used for literature classes for elementary schools in Brazil. It has also been translated and published in the US, Europe and Asia.

The novel is part of a tetralogy written by Vasconcelos and centered on different stages in the life of the protagonist, Zeze, and, by extension, Vasconcelos. The four books were published in a disorganized order, following an aleatory chronology instead of a direct one. The direct continuation of the story, Doidão, was actually published in 1963, five years before My Sweet Orange Tree, and follows the life of Zeze during his adolescence.

== Plot ==
Zeze is a young boy who lives in Bangu, Rio de Janeiro with his underprivileged family. Because everyone is busy trying to support the family, Zeze is usually left by himself with his baby brother Luis, and ends up doing mischievous deeds that make his parents and older siblings so angry that they physically abuse him for what he has done.

After Zeze's father gets fired, the whole family moves, and the new house has a few trees that each of the siblings claims. After having all the trees taken, Zeze gets upset, but one of his older sisters, Gloria, suggests looking in the backyard and Zeze soon discovers a small orange tree. At first, Zeze doesn't like his tree, but he finds out that amazingly, he can communicate with it. He gives the tree a name, Minguinho, and the two become best friends.

Even after meeting a companion, Zeze continues his naughty pranks, and he finally decides to hang on the back of the car of a Portuguese man called Manuel Valadares. Unfortunately Zeze gets busted and Valadares humiliates him in public, causing Zeze to vow to take his revenge. However, Valadares attributes Zeze's attitude to the fact that he's a child and offers Zeze his friendship. With this relationship, Zeze learns what real love is.

The two of them share many memories as good friends, but sadly, Valadares dies in a train accident. Zeze goes through serious mental trauma that causes illness. In the end, Zeze overcomes the trauma, but loses the ability to talk to Minguinho. Zeze also hears the news from his father that he has got a new job and their life will be better. However, Zeze confesses he feels he has killed his father in his mind for the treatment he has given him and expresses sorrow at losing his ‘real’ father, Manuel Valadares.

== Adaptations ==
This book was first adapted into a film in 1970, directed by Aurélio Teixeira. Three telenovelas based on the work were created: in 1970, shown by TV Tupi; in 1980 and 1998, shown by Rede Bandeirantes. In 2003, the work was published in South Korea, in comic book form, in an edition with 224 illustrated pages. In 2012, a new film version, directed by Marcos Bernstein, was produced and shown during the Rio Festival, which began on April 19, 2013.
