= Cláudio Corrêa e Castro =

Brazilian actor (1928–2005)

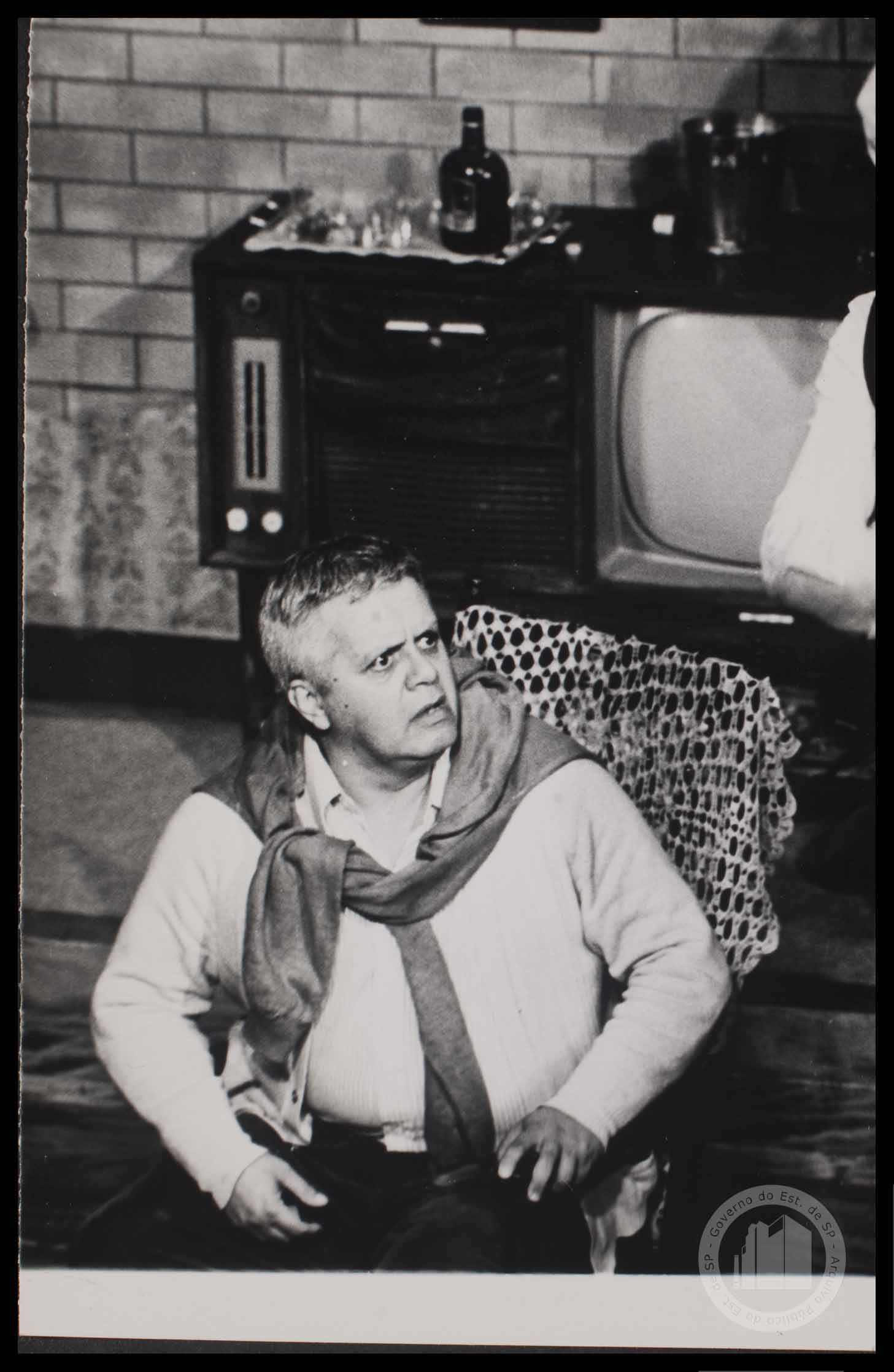
- Castro in the play A Night of Champions by Jason Miller, in 1976
- Born: Cláudio Luís Murgel Corrêa e Castro; 27 February 1928; Rio de Janeiro, Federal District of Brazil
- Died: 16 August 2005 (aged 77); Niterói, Rio de Janeiro, Brazil
- Occupation: Actor
- Years active: 1959–2005
- Awards: APCA Trophy

Cláudio Luís Murgel Corrêa e Castro (February 27, 1928 – August 16, 2005) was a Brazilian actor who appeared in over fifty Brazilian telenovelas. He was known for playing Mr. Leopoldo in Força de um Desejo (1999); Count Klaus in Chocolate com Pimenta (2003); Gugu in A Gata Comeu (1985); Vidal in Eu Prometo; and Archangel Gabriel in Deus Nos Acuda.

== Biography ==
=== First years and education ===
Castro was born in the city of Rio de Janeiro in 1928. Study at the Escola Nacional de Belas Artes na Federal University of Rio de Janeiro (UFRJ) and study in France, returned to Brazil after graduating and began his career as an artist as a painter, but the theater soon entered his life. He majored in theater direction at the Fundação Brasileira de Teatro (FBT).

=== Career ===
Right from his debut in 1954 with the amateur theater group O Tablado, he stood out for his strong stage presence and clear interpretative intentions. He played the role of the stagehand in Our Town by Thornton Wilder, directed by João Bethencourt. By 1955, he had already taken on a major leading role, portraying Uncle Vanya in Uncle Vanya by Anton Chekhov. In the 1959 play Señora Carrar's Rifles by Bertolt Brecht, staged by Renato José Pécora, Castro won the best actor award at the Brazilian Association of Theater Critics Awards.

He made his film debut in Carla Civelli's 1959 film É Um Caso de Polícia. In the 1960s, he was invited to be the first director of the Teatro de Comédia do Paraná (TCP), based in Curitiba, when he invited actor couple Paulo Goulart and Nicette Bruno to be part of TCP's first team.

In 1968, called by Zé Celso, he went to São Paulo to play the title role in Bertolt Brecht's Galileo Galilei, produced by Teatro Oficina, where he played the Fiorentine scientist. In the same year, he made his television debut in the soap opera A Muralha, where he played Dom Manuel Nunes Viana in TV Excelsior.

After working on three soap operas at the station, he moved to TV Tupi in 1970 to join the cast of O Meu Pé de Laranja Lima to play Portuga. He spent seven years at the broadcaster, where he worked on 11 productions, including soap operas such as Mulheres de Areia and Os Inocentes.

In 1978, she moved to Rio de Janeiro's TV Globo to work on the soap opera Dancing Days. He remained with the station for twenty and six years, until 2004. Over the decades he worked on various productions for the broadcaster, including soap operas such as A Gata Comeu, Sinhá Moça, Vale Tudo, Tieta, História de Amor and Chocolate com Pimenta. He also acted in other productions for the broadcaster, such as the comedy Zorra Total and the miniseries A Casa das Sete Mulheres and Engraçadinha: Seus Amores e Seus Pecados.

In addition to television, he has acted in 18 films and 65 plays.

=== Personal life ===
He had three children: Guilherme, from his first marriage, Gabriel and João Pedro, from his second.

==== Death ====
Cláudio suffered from diabetes and hypertension. After her first separation, she got into a lot of financial trouble and even moved to the Retiro dos Artistas, a philanthropic institution in Rio de Janeiro that takes care of artists, athletes and intellectuals with financial problems.

He died of multiple organ failure, due to complications from a heart bypass surgery performed in April 2005 at the São Lucas Hospital in Copacabana.

== Filmography ==
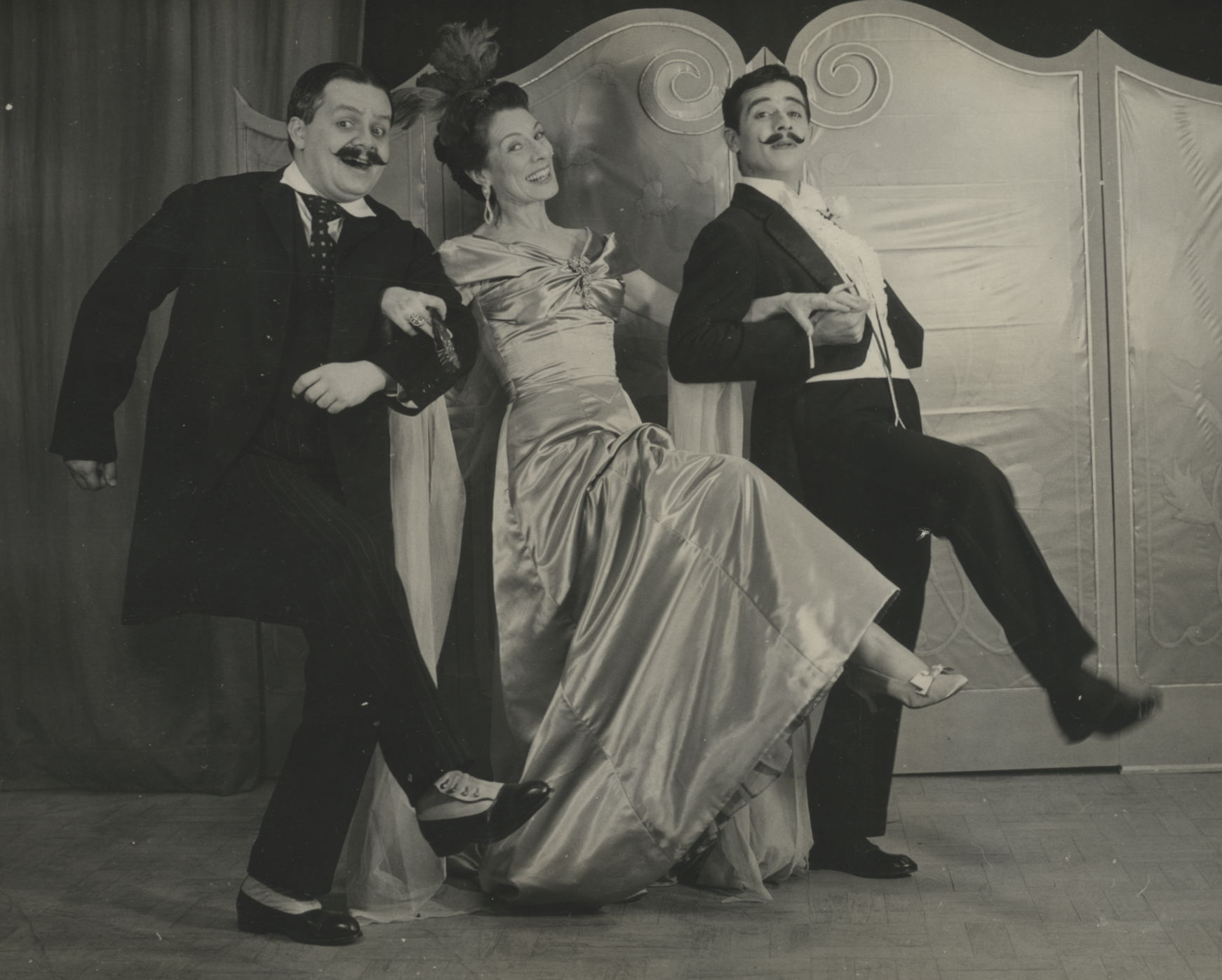
Cláudio Correia e Castro (left), Maria Sampaio and Roberto Ribeiro in O Chapéu de Palha de Itália (June of 1958)

=== Cinema ===
Year	Movie	Role
1959	É Um Caso de Polícia	
1962	Cinco Vezes Favela	
1967	O Mundo Alegre de Helô	Dr. Quinzinho
1973	Amante Muito Louca	Amâncio
1976	Tiradentes, o Mártir da Independência	Visconde de Barbacena
1977	Elas São do Baralho	Eugênio Miranda
1979	O Caso Cláudia	Otto Dorf
1980	Prova de Fogo	
1980	Os 7 Gatinhos	Dr. Bordalo
1981	Engraçadinha	Politician
1989	O Grande Mentecapto	Bossman
1997	O Noviço Rebelde	Father Manuel
1999	Tiradentes	Veloso
1999	Mauá - O Imperador e o Rei	Visconde do Uruguai
2000	Duas Vezes com Helena	Father
2000	Xuxa Popstar	Olimpio
2001	Minha Vida em Suas Mãos	Man robbed
2004	Irmãos de Fé	Gamaliel

=== Television ===
Year	Title	Character	Network
1968	A Muralha	Manuel Nunes Viana	Rede Excelsior
1969	Dez Vidas	Visconde de Barbacena	Rede Excelsior
1969	Os Estranhos	Radamés de Castro	Rede Excelsior
1969	Sangue do Meu Sangue	Dom Pedro II	Rede Excelsior
1970	O Meu Pé de Laranja Lima	Manuel Valadares (Portuga)	Rede Tupi
1970	As Bruxas	Otto Wagner Manhães	Rede Tupi
1971	Nossa Filha Gabriela	Napoleão Araújo Leme	Rede Tupi
1972	Camomila e Bem-me-quer	José Romão (Romão)	Rede Tupi
1972	Signo da Esperança	Dr. José Henrique Aragão	Rede Tupi
1973	Mulheres de Areia	Virgílio Assunção	Rede Tupi
1974	Os Inocentes	João Flores (Padre João)	Rede Tupi
1975	A Viagem	Daniel Fernandes (Conselheiro Daniel)	Rede Tupi
1975	Meu Rico Português	Rodolfo Moraes (Rudolph)	Rede Tupi
1976	O Julgamento	Lourenço Paixão	Rede Tupi
1976	Xeque-Mate	Raffles Bastos	Rede Tupi
1977	O Profeta	Clóvis Moura	Rede Tupi
1978	Dancin' Days	Franklin Prado Cardoso	TV Globo
1979	Cabocla	Boanerges Pereira (Coronel Boanerges)	TV Globo
1980	Chega Mais	Belmiro Maia	TV Globo
1980	As Três Marias	Jonas Freitas da Silva	TV Globo
1981	Jogo da Vida	Etevaldo de Alencastro (Dr. Etevaldo)	TV Globo
1982	Lampião e Maria Bonita	Euclides Fonseca	TV Globo
1982	Paraíso	Eleutério Ferrabraz (Coronel Eleutério)	TV Globo
1983	Parabéns pra Você	Cristovão Moreira Braga	TV Globo
1983	Eu Prometo	Lorival Vidal Marques	TV Globo
1983	Champagne	Ralph Campello	TV Globo
1984	Transas e Caretas	Régis Fontoura	TV Globo
1984	Caso Verdade	Flávio Farina (Eps. "Esperança")	TV Globo
1985	A Gata Comeu	Gustavo Penaforte (Gugu)	TV Globo
1986	Anos Dourados	Felipe Carneiro (Dr. Carneiro)	TV Globo
1986	Cambalacho	Bóris Monteiro	TV Globo
1986	Sinhá Moça	João Aristides Amorim (Dr. Aristides)	TV Globo
1986	Hipertensão	Napoleão Alves	TV Globo
1987	Bambolê	Caio Zambrini Bambriani	TV Globo
1988	O Primo Basílio	Ricardo Mourão	TV Globo
1988	Vale Tudo	Bartolomeu Meirelles	TV Globo
1989	Tieta	Mariano Rocha (Padre Mariano)	TV Globo
1990	Boca do Lixo (minissérie)	Joaquim Junqueira (Junqueira)	TV Globo
1990	Rainha da Sucata	Dr. Rogério	TV Globo
1990	Lua Cheia de Amor	Businessman	TV Globo
1990	La Mamma	Father	TV Globo
1991	O Dono do Mundo	Vicente Arruda	TV Globo
1992	Deus Nos Acuda	Gabriel	TV Globo
1993	Agosto	Ilídio Alencar Prado	TV Globo
1994	A Viagem	Carlos Barbosa (Dr. Carlos)	TV Globo
1994	Pátria Minha	Valdomiro Bezerra de Quental	TV Globo
1994	Incidente em Antares	Vivaldino Brazão (Prefeito Vivaldino)	TV Globo
1994	Quatro por Quatro	Doctor	TV Globo
1995	Engraçadinha: Seus Amores e Seus Pecados	Arnaldo Perreira de Almeida (Dr. Arnaldo)	TV Globo
1995	Malhação	Judge Aristides Maia	TV Globo
1995	História de Amor	Rômulo Sampaio	TV Globo
1996	O Rei do Gado	Toni Vendacchio	TV Globo
1996	Anjo de Mim	Inácio Gonçalves	TV Globo
1997	Anjo Mau	Augusto Machado	TV Globo
1998	Meu Bem Querer	Padre Ovídio	TV Globo
1999	Força de um Desejo	Leopoldo Silveira	TV Globo
2000	O Cravo e a Rosa	Normando Castor	TV Globo
2001	Porto dos Milagres	Seu Babau	TV Globo
2001	A Padroeira	Dom Agostinho de Miranda	TV Globo
2002	O Quinto dos Infernos	Dr. Vieira	TV Globo
2002	Malhação	Juiz Aristides Maia	TV Globo
2002	Esperança	Agostino	TV Globo
2003	A Casa das Sete Mulheres	Bartolomeu Queiroz	TV Globo
2003	Kubanacan	Coronel Tijon	TV Globo
2003	Chocolate com Pimenta	Conde Klaus Von Burgo	TV Globo
2004–2005	Zorra Total	Anacleto	TV Globo
2004	Senhora do Destino	Dr. Afonso	TV Globo

=== Theatre ===
Year	Play	Role	Playwright	Director	Theatre	Notes	Ref.
1954	Nossa Cidade		Thornton Wilder	João Bethencourt			
1954	O rapto das cebolinhas	Coronel	Maria Clara Machado	Maria Clara Machado			
1955	Uncle Vanya		Anton Tchekhov	Geraldo Queirós			
1955	O Baile dos Ladrões	Dupont-Duport Pai	Jean Anouilh	Geraldo Queirós			
1956	Dois a Dois		Georges Neveux	Adolfo Celi			
1956	Um Deus Dormiu Lá em Casa		Guilherme Figueiredo	Adolfo Celi		Assistant director	
1956	A Viúva Astuciosa	Milord Runebif	Carlo Goldoni	Adolfo Celi			
1956	Othello	Lodovico	William Shakespeare	Adolfo Celi	Dulcina Theater, Rio de Janeiro		
1957	O rapto das cebolinhas		Maria Clara Machado	Cláudio Corrêa e Castro			
1957	Esses maridos	Dr. Brubacker	George Axelrod	Adolfo Celi	Belo Horizonte		
1957	Frankel	Roberto	Antônio Callado	Adolfo Celi	Porto Alegre		
1957	Auto da Infância de Jesus		Henri Ghéon	Benedito Corsi	Ginástico Theater, Rio de Janeiro		
1958	A Fábula de Brooklyn		Irwin Shaw	Geraldo Queirós	Rio de Janeiro		
1958	Chapéu de Palha da Itália		Eugène Labiche	Geraldo Queirós			
1960	Um Elefante no Caos ou o jornal do Brasil		Millôr Fernandes	João Bethencourt	Praça Theater, Rio de Janeiro		
1961	Escola de Mulheres		Molière	Renato José Pécora	Rio de Janeiro		
1961	Os Fuzis da Senhora Carrar		Bertolt Brecht	Renato José Pécora	Praça Theater, Rio de Janeiro		
1961	O Velho Ciumento		Miguel de Cervantes	Gianni Ratto	Maison de France Theater, Rio de Janeiro		
1961	Os Ciúmes de um Pedestre		Martins Pena	Gianni Ratto	Maison de France Theater, Rio de Janeiro		
1962	O Beijo no Asfalto	Investigator Aruba	Nelson Rodrigues	Fernando Torres	Maison de France Theater, Rio de Janeiro		
1962	O Homem, a Besta e a Virtude		Luigi Pirandello		Maison de France Theater, Rio de Janeiro		
1962	Com a Pulga Atrás da Orelha			Gianni Ratto	Porto Alegre		
1962	O Médico Volante	Gorgibus	Molière	Gianni Ratto	São Paulo		
1963	A Vida Impressa em Dólar		Clifford Odets	Claudio Corrêa e Castro	Curitiba		
1963	As Colunas da Sociedade		Henrik Ibsen	Claudio Corrêa e Castro	Curitiba		
1963	Um elefante no caos		Millôr Fernandes	Claudio Corrêa e Castro	Curitiba		
1964	A megera domada		William Shakespeare	Claudio Corrêa e Castro	Curitiba		
1964	O Baile dos Ladrões		Jean Anouilh	Claudio Corrêa e Castro	Curitiba		
1965	O Santo Milgaroso		Lauro César Muniz	Claudio Corrêa e Castro	Curitiba		
1966	O Homem do Principio ao Fim		Millôr Fernandes	Fernando Torres	Rio de Janeiro		
1966	Os físicos	Inspetor Richard Voss	Friedrich Dürrenmatt	Ziembinski	Copacabana Theater, Rio de Janeiro		
1967	Yerma		Federico García Lorca	Claudio Corrêa e Castro	Curitiba		
1967	Nossa Cidade		Thornton Wilder	Claudio Corrêa e Castro	Curitiba		
1967	As Artimanhas de Scapino		Molière	Claudio Corrêa e Castro	Curitiba		
1968	Galileo Galilei	Galileo Galilei	Bertolt Brecht	Zé Celso	Teatro Oficina, São Paulo		
1968	Schweik na II Guerra Mundial		Bertolt Brecht	Claudio Corrêa e Castro	Curitiba		
1968	Oh! Papai, Pobre Paizinho, Mamãe Te Pendurou no Armário e Eu Estou Tão Tristinho		Arthur Kopit	Claudio Corrêa e Castro	Curitiba		
1969	Hamlet	King Claudius	William Shakespeare	Flávio Rangel	SESC Consolação, São Paulo		
1970	Jorginho, o Machão		Leilah Assunção	Clóvis Bueno	São Paulo		
1971	Guerra do Cansa-Cavalo		Osman Lins	Celso Nunes	Municipal Theater of Santo André, Santo André		
1972	Pequenos Assassinatos	Carol Newquist, the father	Jules Feiffer	Osmar Rodrigues Cruz	São Paulo		
1973	Caiu o Ministério		França Júnior	Osmar Rodrigues Cruz	São Paulo		
1974	Leonor de Mendonça	Duque de Bragança	Gonçalves Dias	Osmar Rodrigues Cruz	São Paulo		
1976	A História É Uma História		Millôr Fernandes	Claudio Corrêa e Castro	São Paulo		
1976	O Noviço		Martins Pena	Osmar Rodrigues Cruz	São Paulo		
1977	Computa, Computador, Computa		Millôr Fernandes	Celso Nunes	São Paulo		
1980	Os Órfãos de Jânio		Millôr Fernandes	Sérgio Britto	Rio de Janeiro		
1981	Viva Sem Medo Suas Fantasias Sexuais		John Tobias	Renato José Pécora	Rio de Janeiro		
1981	O Dia em que Alfredo Virou a Mão		João Bethencourt	João Bethencourt	Rio de Janeiro		
1984	Brejnev Janta Seu Alfaiate	Leonid Brejhnev	João Bethencourt	Renato José Pécora	Praia Theater, Rio de Janeiro		
1988	O Manifesto		Brian Clark	José Possi Neto	São Paulo		
1995	A Luz da Lua		Harold Pinter	Ítalo Rossi	Rio de Janeiro		
2002	A Visita da Velha Senhora		Friedrich Dürrenmatt	Moacyr Góes	Nelson Rodrigues Theater, Rio de Janeiro		
