= Jesus Chediak =

Brazilian actor (1941–2020)

- Born: August 10, 1941; Brazil
- Died: May 8, 2020 (aged 78); Rio de Janeiro, Brazil
- Occupations: Actor, director, producer, writer
- Years active: 1968–2014
- Spouse: Glória Chediak
- Children: 4
- Relatives: Almir Chediak (brother)

Jesus Chediak (10 August 1941 – 8 May 2020) was a Brazilian actor, film director, film producer, journalist, and theatre director.

== Life ==
During his cinematic career, Chediak was responsible for six feature films, working at various functions such as, actor, director, producer and writer.

Aside from his career in cinema, he also worked as a professor at Federal University of Bahia.

In 2017, he was appointed Casa França-Brasil's new director.

At the time of his death, Chediak held the post of Cultural manager of the Associação Brasileira de Imprensa.

== Personal life ==
Chediak was married to journalist Glória Chediak. The couple had four kids.

He had two brothers, Braz Chediak who is also an actor, screenwriter and filmmaker and Almir Chediak who was a record producer.

== Death ==
On 8 May 2020, Chediak died from COVID-19 during the COVID-19 pandemic in Brazil in Rio de Janeiro at the age 78.

== Filmography ==
=== Film ===
Year	Title	Actor	Director	Writer	Producer	Role	Notes
1968	Os Viciados	No	No	Yes	No		
1974	Banana Mecânica	No	No	Yes	No		
1975	A Lenda de Ubirajara	Yes	No	No	Yes		
1977	Ladrões de Cinema	Yes	No	No	No		
1979	As Borboletas Também Amam	Yes	No	No	No		
2014	Parto para a liberdade – Uma breve história de Pedro Aleixo	Yes	Yes	Yes	Yes	Himself	Documentary
