= List of programs broadcast by Disney Channel (Brazil) =

The following is a list of programs broadcast by Disney Channel (Brazil). It does not include Disney XD, or Disney Junior programs. All programs are dubbed in Portuguese.

== Former programming ==
Former programming
Title	Portuguese title
Ducktales (2017)	DuckTales - Os Caçadores de Aventuras
Tangled: The Series	Enrolados: A Série
Andi Mack	Andi Mack
Raven's Home	A Casa da Raven
Hotel Transylvania: The Series	Hotel Transylvania: A Serie
Elena of Avalor	Elena de Avalor
Bizaardvark	Bizaardvark
Stuck in the Middle	A Irma do Meio
Bunk'd	Acampados
K.C. Undercover	Agente K.C.
Soy Luna	Sou Luna
Juacas	Juacas
Z4	Z4
The Next Step	The Next Step
Best Friends Whenever	Amigas a Qualquer Hora
Girl Meets World	Garota Conhece o Mundo
What Talent!	Que Talento!
Gemini 8	Gemini 8
Liv and Maddie	Liv e Maddie
Camp Lakebottom	Acampamento Lakebottom
The 7D	Os 7A
I Didn't Do It	Não Fui Eu
Dog with a Blog	Stan, O Cão Blogueiro
Gravity Falls	Gravity Falls: Um Verão de Mistérios
Violetta	Violetta
Austin & Ally	Austin & Ally
Jessie	Jessie
A.N.T. Farm	Programa de Talentos
Shake It Up	No Ritmo
Fish Hooks	Adolepeixes
Good Luck Charlie	Boa Sorte, Charlie!
Sonny with a Chance	Sunny Entre Estrelas
Wizards of Waverly Place	Os Feiticeiros de Waverly Place
Phineas and Ferb	Phineas e Ferb
Hannah Montana	Hannah Montana
American Dragon: Jake Long	Jake Long: O Dragão Ocidental
Brandy & Mr. Whiskers	Brandy & Sr. Bigodes
That's So Raven	As Visões da Raven
The Fairly OddParents	Os Padrinhos Mágicos
DuckTales	DuckTales - Os Caçadores de Aventuras
Imperial Family	Família Imperial
Wolfblood	Wolfblood: Família Lobo
Code: 9	Código: 9
PrankStars	PrankStars
So Random!	Sem Sentido!
Jonas	Jonas
Jake & Blake	Jake e Blake
The Suite Life on Deck	Zack e Cody: Gêmeos a Bordo
Paradise Café	Paradise Café
Stitch!	Stitch!
A Very Naughty Boy	Um Menino Muito Maluquinho
George of the Jungle	George, o Rei da Floresta
Cory in the House	Cory na Casa Branca
A Kind of Magic	Minha Família Mágica
Mortified	Ninguém Merece!
The Replacements	Os Substitutos
The Emperor's New School	A Nova Escola do Imperador
Life with Derek	Minha Vida com Derek
The Suite Life of Zack & Cody	Zack e Cody: Gêmeos em Ação
The Buzz on Maggie	Maggie: A Mosca Zoadora
Floribella	Floribella
Phil of the Future	Phil do Futuro
Lilo & Stitch: The Series	Lilo & Stitch: A Série
Kim Possible	Kim Possible
The Proud Family	Família Radical
House of Mouse	O Point do Mickey
Lizzie McGuire	Lizzie McGuire
Even Stevens	Mano a Mana
So Weird	Sinistro
Recess	Hora do Recreio
Pepper Ann	Ana Pimentinha
Buzz Lightyear of Star Command (English language only)	Buzz Lightyear do Comando Estelar

== Disney Junior ==
Title	Portuguese title
Art Attack	Art Attack
Jake and the Never Land Pirates	Jake e os Piratas da Terra do Nunca
Mickey Mouse Clubhouse	A Casa do Mickey Mouse
Muppet Babies	Muppet Babies
Jungle Junction	Jungle Junction
PJ Masks	PJ Masks
Doc McStuffins	Doutora Brinquedos
Sofia the First	Princesinha Sofia
