= O Ébrio =

Brazilian telenovela

- Genre: Telenovela
- Created by: Vicente Celestino
- Developed by: José Castellar; Heloísa Castellar
- Directed by: José Castellar; Heloísa Castellar
- Starring: Ricardo Nóvoa; Líria Marçal; Nydia Lícia; Berta Zemel; Xandó Batista; Telcy Perez
- Country of origin: Brazil
- Original language: Portuguese
- No. of episodes: 75

Original release
- Network: TV Globo
- Release: 8 November 1965 – 18 February 1966

O Ébrio (English: The Drunkard) is a Brazilian telenovela produced and broadcast by TV Globo. It premiered on 8 November 1965 and ended on 18 February 1966. It is the first "novela das oito" to be aired in the timeslot.

Written and directed by José Castellar and Heloísa Castellar, the novela is inspired by the song of the same name by Vicente Celestino and featured a guest appearance by the singer in the first episode.

== Plot ==
The Drunkard tells the story of Gilberto, a man who, after being deceived by his relatives and friends and betrayed by his wife, is presumed dead due to his severe alcoholism. A case of mistaken identity earns him the nickname “The Drunkard”, by which he becomes known.

== Cast ==
Actor	Character
Ricardo Nóvoa	Gilberto
Líria Marçal	Marieta
Nydia Lícia	Francisca
Eloísa Mafalda	Eloísa
Berta Zemel	Adélia
Xandó Batista	Coronel Romualdo
Jacyra Silva	Regina
Rogério Márcico	Rogerinho
Lucy Meirelles	Liza
Telcy Perez	Medeiros
Márcia Cardeal	Vera
Gervásio Marques	
Osmano Cardoso	
Rubens Campos	
Francisco Serrano	
Vicente Celestino	special appearance
