= My Sweet Orange Tree (film) =

2012 film directed by Marcos Bernstein

- Theatrical release poster
- Portuguese: Meu Pé de Laranja Lima
- Directed by: Marcos Bernstein
- Screenplay by: Marcos Bernstein; Melanie Dimantas
- Based on: Meu Pé de Laranja Lima by José Mauro de Vasconcelos
- Produced by: Katia Machado
- Starring: José de Abreu; João Guilherme Ávila; Eduardo Dascar; Fernanda Vianna; Emiliano Queiroz; Tino Gomes; Caco Ciocler
- Cinematography: Gustavo Hadba
- Edited by: Marcelo Moraes
- Music by: Armand Amar
- Production company: Passaro Films
- Distributed by: Imovision
- Release dates: 29 September 2012 (Festival do Rio); 19 April 2013 (Brazil)
- Running time: 99 minutes
- Country: Brazil
- Language: Portuguese
- Budget: R$ 3–3.5 million
- Box office: R$ 659,786

My Sweet Orange Tree (Portuguese: Meu Pé de Laranja Lima) is a 2012 Brazilian drama film directed by Marcos Bernstein, based on the 1968 novel of the same name by José Mauro de Vasconcelos, marking the second feature-length adaptation of the novel. Starring João Guilherme Ávila and José de Abreu, the film follows the story of Zezé, a very imaginative but misunderstood boy.

The idea of adapting the novel started in 2004, when at the request of the film's producer, Katia Machado, Marcos Bernstein and Melanie Dimantas wrote a screenplay. Later, Bernstein offered to direct the film, which was for a while a French-Brazilian production until it finished as an exclusively Brazilian film.

After filming between 2010 and 2011 in Minas Gerais, My Sweet Orange Tree premiered at the Festival do Rio on 29 September 2012. The film was released theatrically in Brazil on 19 April 2013 and received mixed reviews from critics, who highlighted Ávila's performance and Gustavo Hadba's photography.

== Plot ==
My Sweet Orange Tree begins with José Mauro de Vasconcelos (Caco Ciocler) receiving an edition of his finished novel. Then, the film starts to tell the story from the writer's memories, through flashbacks. Eight-year-old Zezé lives in Minas Gerais in a very humble house with his family, consisting of his father, unemployed and alcoholic, and his mother, who works to support the home, him and his brother and sisters. Despite the lack of understanding, affection and the aggression suffered from his father and school colleagues, the boy has a great skill for storytelling using his imagination.

Facing financial difficulties, the family has to move. At the new home Zezé discovers an orange tree which he will come to talk to every day however, for being extremely extroverted, he winds up getting involved in several confusions. In one such instance, he tries to ride on the bumper of Manoel "Portuga" Valadares, but is caught and spanked publicly. The boy feels humiliated and wants revenge, however Valadares ends up understanding Zezé, and is able to share in his world of fantasies, and a new friendship arises.

== Cast ==
- João Guilherme Ávila as Zezé
- José de Abreu as Portuga
- Caco Ciocler as José Mauro de Vasconcelos
- Eduardo Dascar as Paulo, Zezé's father
- Fernanda Vianna as Selma, Zezé's mother
- Pedro Vale as Totoca
- Leônidas José as Luís
- Julia de Victa as Glória
- Kathia Calil as Jandira
- Eduardo Moreira as Ladislau
- Tino Gomes as Ariovaldo
