= Chamas da Vida =

Brazilian telenovela

- Also known as: Llamas de la Vida
- Genre: Telenovela
- Created by: Cristianne Fridman
- Directed by: Edgard Miranda
- Starring: Leonardo Brício; Juliana Silveira; Lucinha Lins among others
- Theme music composer: Rose
- Opening theme: "Fogo e Paixão", performed by Fábio Júnior
- Country of origin: Brazil
- Original language: Portuguese
- No. of episodes: 253

Production
- Production locations: RecNov, Rio de Janeiro
- Camera setup: Multiple-camera setup
- Running time: 50 mins. approximately

Original release
- Network: RecordTV
- Release: July 8, 2008 – April 28, 2009

Chamas da Vida (English: Flames of Life) is a Brazilian telenovela produced by RecordTV. It premiered on July 8, 2008 and aired until April 28, 2009, at 9:45 p.m. schedule. Created by Cristianne Fridman, the telenovela is written by her in collaboration with Paula Richard, Renata Dias Gomes, Camilo Pellegrini and Nélio Abbade. It is directed by Edgard Miranda, Roberto Bomtempo and Rudi Lagemann.

== Plot ==
Pedro is a firefighter which lives in the neighborhood of Tinguá, in the border of Rio de Janeiro and Nova Iguaçu municipalities. After the sudden death of his parents, Pedro became responsible for the custody of his three brothers: Viviane, Rafael and trouble-maker Antônio, who works on GG ("Gelado-e-Gostoso", which is Portuguese for "Icy-and-Delicious"), a fictional ice cream factory located in Tinguá. At nights, Antônio and his gang ("Gangue do Ferro-Velho", Portuguese for "The Junkyard Gang") practices acts of vandalism on the neighborhood, what makes his relationship with Pedro progressively estranged. Pedro dates Ivonete, twin sister of Lieutenant Wallace, Pedro's best friend since childhood.

Carolina is the only child of Walter and Arlete, founders of GG. She lives in the upper-class neighborhood of Urca and manages her own video production company. She dates Tomás for three years. She is about to marry him, without suspecting that all he wants is to take control of GG. Tomás is the son of manipulative Vilma, co-founder of GG, which wants them to get marry for her to control GG once again. Her late husband João co-founded GG with Walter, Arlete and her, but Walter dissolved the partnership after João was accused of corruption, taking control of all the factory shares himself.

Pedro and Carolina where friends at childhood, but lost personal contact after they became adults. After Antônio set fire on a fraternization of GG workers, they meet once again. They feel a sudden attraction for each other, what causes instantaneous jealousy on Tomás. A security worker deletes Antônio, who loses his job, compromising even more the troubled relationship with his brother. Carolina was filming the fraternization and returns at the factory at the same night to pick up her camera. She sees herself trapped when somebody sets the building on fire. Pedro and Wallace go for her rescue and, on the meanwhile, Wallace dies. Antônio's gang was depredating GG's wall during the same night, and he is suspected of setting the place on fire. The factory works are transferred to a second building on the same area.

Realizing the mutual interest between Carolina and Pedro, Ivonete decides to ally with Tomás to separate them. The plan fails, and Carolina starts dating Pedro, while Tomás starts a relationship with Ivonete. Vilma, the real incendiary, falsifies an insurance policy to look like Walter set his own factory on fire. She set the factory on fire to eliminate proof that she and Tomás were committing corruption. Tomás' hate against Walter and his family is fed by his mother, who tells him that Walter was responsible for João's death. According to her, João could not handle the pressure of being accused by Walter and died of a heart attack. It is then revealed that João died after being hit on the head by Miguel, Vilma's lover. After discovering this, Tomás turns against his mother, which becomes the main suspect of setting the factory on fire after the testimonies of Verônica and Ricardo, secretaries on the factory, which had seen her with her second victim, an insurance worker which she bribed to falsify the policy whose car had blown up. After Walter dies on a set-up, it is revealed that there is a second incendiary, self-named "Phoenix", who is trying to incriminate Vilma. The identity of Walter's killer (i.e. "Phoenix") remained unknown until the last chapter, when the mysterious firer armed an ambush which resulted in Arlete's death (she was exploded alive inside her own car while chasing after Vilma) and Vilma incriminated with murder, thus sending her to prison. Through a teddy bear encasing a cell phone linked with a powerful bomb, "Phoenix" revealed himself to Vilma to be indeed Leo, partnered with his older sister Darlene, the villainess's former house maid. Leo and Darlene finally reveal their prime motive to destroy Vilma: they were both children of the deceased legist doctor whom Vilma bribed to deliver a false autopsy record surrounding João's death; times later, the same doctor, unable to live anymore with the shame of doing such an unethical thing, committed suicide, thus triggering Leo's and Darlene's thirst of revenge against Vilma for their father. Vilma is then killed by the blast, but "Phoenix"'s identities remained unknown for anyone else in the series.

== Cast ==
- Leonardo Brício - Corporal Pedro Galvão Ferreira
- Juliana Silveira - Carolina Monteiro Azevedo de Castro
- Lucinha Lins - Vilma Oliveira Santos
- Bruno Ferrari - Tomás Oliveira Santos
- Amandha Lee - Ivonete
- Dado Dolabella - Antônio Galvão Ferreira
- Jussara Freire - Arlete Monteiro Azevedo de Castro
- Antônio Grassi - Dr. Walter Azevedo de Castro
- Floriano Peixoto - Miguel Costa
- Íris Bruzzi - Tereza ("Vó Tuquinha")
- Andréia Horta - Beatriz Oliveira Santos
- Letícia Colin - Viviane Galvão Ferreira ("Vivi")
- Ana Paula Tabalipa - Raíssa Mendes
- Milhem Cortaz - Corporal Carlos José Lima ("Cazé")
- Roger Gobeth - Corporal Guilherme Pimenta Britto ("Gui")
- Ewerton de Castro - Hermes Britto Pimenta ("Seu Britto")
- André Fillippi di Mauro - Felipe Rezende ("Lipe")
- Raymundo de Souza - Colonel-Lieutenant Eurico Camargo
- Umberto Magnani - Dionísio Cardoso de Oliveira
- Giuseppe Oristanio - Roberto Cardoso de Oliveira
- Juliana Lohmann - Manuella Castelli ("Manu")
- Luíza Curvo - Michelle Gomes
- Andressa Oliveira - Lídia
- Nathália Rodrigues - Suelen Almeida Batista
- Gabriel Gracindo - Corporal Eurico Camargo Jr. ("Júnior")
- Nina de Pádua - Lourdes
- Stela Freitas - Dra. Roseclair Pimenta Britto
- Catarina Abdalla - Margareth das Dores Vieira
- Ivone Hoffmann - Odiléia Pimenta
- Marilu Bueno - Tia Catarina
- Mariana Hein - Andressa
- Dáblio Moreira - Máicon das Dores Vieira ("Demorô")
- Thiago de Los Reyes - Gustavo Oliveira Santos ("Guga")
- Vítor Hugo - Fernando Teixeira ("Marreta")
- Claudiana Cotrim - Darlene
- Rafael Queiroga - Leonardo ("Léo") / "Phoenix"
- Edward Boggis - Diego
- Roberta Santiago - Gildete Rodrigues
- Lisandra Parede - Telma
- Giordanna Forte - Cintia Teixeira
- Guilherme Leme - André
- Roberto Bontempo - Marcos ("Docinho")
- Rodrigo Faro - Corporal Wallace
- Sandra Pêra - Mercedes Ferreira
- Igor Cotrim - Jairo
- André Luiz Miranda - "Lincoln"

== Controversies ==
One of the characters of the supporting cast, Viviane, gets involved with Lipe, a pedophile, on the internet. After his mother's death, Lipe moves from São Paulo to Nova Iguaçu, and ends up raping Viviane in the forest. After his second rape attempt, Lipe is caught by the police, but escapes. Viviane gets pregnant and undergoes an abortion. Besides being a legal procedure on rape cases in Brazil, abortion was never treated in a frank and positive way on telenovelas such as it has been on Chamas da Vida. On the other hand, the telenovela also portrays the drama of women who decide to carry on a pregnancy resulted from rape with the character of Raíssa. She is forced by her parents to give birth to Gabriel, who is raised as her brother. After both her parents die in a car accident, she becomes responsible for Gabriel, taking him from the countryside to Nova Iguaçu. The telenovela was also groundbreaking in Brazil for showing the prejudice transsexual people suffer with the character of Carlão/Docinho (lived by Roberto Bomtempo, one of its directors).

== Audience ==
Chamas da Vida premiered at second place on the audience ratings. After SBT started to rerun Pantanal, the telenovela lost part of its audience. However, it remained on the second place, losing it to Pantanal once in a while. After the end of both Pantanal and Rede Globo's A Favorita, Chamas da Vida rose its audience ratings. The telenovela has reached an average rating of 15,5 in Rio de Janeiro and of 13,8 in São Paulo. Although its audience rating is higher in Rio than in São Paulo, proportionally Chamas da Vida has almost the double of viewers in the latter.

Preceded by Amor e Intrigas (2007–2008)	Rede Record; 10 p.m. telenovela (2008–2009)	Succeeded by Poder Paralelo (2009)
