= Floribella (Brazilian TV series) =

Brazilian telenovela

- Genre: Telenovela
- Created by: Patrícia Moretzsohn; Jaqueline Vargas
- Based on: Floricienta, by Cris Morena
- Directed by: Elizabetta Zenatti
- Starring: List: Juliana Silveira Roger Gobeth Mário Frias Maria Carolina Ribeiro Suzy Rêgo Daniel Ávila Cássia Linhares Fernando Alves Pinto Gustavo Leão Gabriel Lasmar Johnny Massaro Mariah de Moraes João Vithor Oliveira Julianne Trevisol Letícia Colin
- Opening theme: "Floribella" by Juliana Silveira (First season) "É pra Você Meu Coração" by Juliana Silveira (Second season)
- Country of origin: Brazil
- No. of seasons: 2
- No. of episodes: 344

Original release
- Network: Band; Max
- Release: April 4, 2005 – August 12, 2006

Floribella is a 344-chapter Brazilian telenovela produced and broadcast by Rede Bandeirantes between April 4, 2005, and August 12, 2006. It was divided into two seasons, the first with 170 chapters and the second with 173. It replaced the news slot and was replaced by the children's program Pic Nick Band. It is a remake of the Argentine telenovela Floricienta, originally written by Cris Morena, adapted by Patrícia Moretzsohn and Jaqueline Vargas, and directed by Ricardo F. Ferreira and Elisabetta Zenatti. It is the first telenovela produced by Rede Bandeirantes since Meu Pé de Laranja Lima (1998). The company was inspired by the success of the Argentine original and Brazilian remakes, such as Chiquititas, to create the plot.

Deeply inspired by the works Cinderella and The Sound of Music, Floribella was described by the press as the "Cinderella of the 2000s", where the crystal shoe was swapped for a sneaker. Aimed at children, Floribella had an overall average of 4 points, doubling Rede Bandeirantes' figures for the time slot. Television journalists reviewed it positively; consequently, Floribella was nominated for ten categories in the 8th Contigo! TV Awards. As a telenovela with a musical plot, two soundtracks were released, becoming commercial successes and selling over three hundred thousand copies in total. Two DVDs and a remix album also hit the market.

It features Juliana Silveira, Roger Gobeth, Mário Frias, Maria Carolina Ribeiro, Suzy Rêgo, Daniel Ávila, Cássia Linhares and Fernando Alves Pinto in the lead roles.

== Storyline ==
=== First season ===
Maria Flor (Juliana Silveira) is a dreamy girl who lost her mother as a child and was brought up by her godmother, Titina (Zezé Motta), who always helped her make her dreams come true. She starts working as a nanny at the Fritzenwalden mansion, where six orphaned siblings live. The eldest, Fred (Roger Gobeth), who had to give up his career abroad to take care of the younger ones, becomes bitter and cold because of the burden he carries. The other brothers are Guto (Gustavo Leão), a handsome and popular surfer, Betinho (Gabriel Lasmar), Guto's non-identical twin who is considered "ugly", João Pedro (Johnny Massaro), a nerd who only thinks about rules, Bruna (Mariah de Moraes), a spoiled and rebellious girl, and little Joca (João Vithor Oliveira).

Flor already knew all of Fred's brothers, except for Guto, who spends most of his time away from the family because of surfing. She met the brothers at a clandestine party they threw at the mansion during Fred's trip. At the party, she played with her band, which also included DiCaprio (Bruno Miguel), Tati (Úrsula Corona), Juju (Eline Porto) and Batuca (André Luiz Miranda), Titina's son who Flor considers to be her brother. Despite making all the previous nannies run away and almost driving housekeeper Helga (Vic Militello) crazy, the brothers like and respect Flor for this previous connection and, little by little, Fred, who didn't like the nanny's eccentric and positivist way, also starts to admire her and the two fall in love. However, Fred's fiancée, the arrogant Delfina (Maria Carolina Ribeiro), and her mother, Malva (Suzy Rêgo), are not happy about this and are willing to do anything to make the wedding happen so that they can get their hands on the Fritzenwalden fortune and make Flor's life a living hell.

There are also other characters, such as Adriano (Daniel Ávila), a cousin of the Fritzenwaldens who arrives at the mansion to study and also falls in love with Flor, vying for her attention with Fred. Sofia, Malva's daughter, who is considered "ugly" and awkward, and unlike her mother and sister, likes Flor. Luciano (Bruno Padilha) is Delfina's lover and helps her in her schemes, while Matheus (Igor Cotrim) is Fred's best friend and advisor. There's also Martinha (Letícia Colin), a DJ who befriends Flor and helps her produce the band's music. Malva is also looking for the bastard daughter that her late husband had out of wedlock, whom she wants to intimidate into giving up half of her inheritance, although no one imagines that the girl is Flor.

=== Second season ===
After Fred dies in a plane crash, Delfina believes that she will become guardian of the Fritzenwaldens and inherit their fortune, as she married him before the trip. However, she marvels when she discovers that he has handed over guardianship of the brothers to Count Máximo (Mário Frias), and she is entitled to nothing. Flor faces a sexist and arrogant boy, who hates being in charge of five young people and clashes with her constantly. The two gradually discover that they are more alike than they seem and they fall in love. As before, Delfina decides to conquer Máximo in order to gain access to the money with the help of her mother Malva and Luciano, who threatens her to give him half the money or he will tell her that she has committed the crime of bigamy, since she had married him too.

Bruna leaves to study in Europe and Olívia (Julianne Trevisol), the brothers' cousin who has been in love with Betinho since childhood, arrives at the mansion, but faces interference from her ex-boyfriend Christian (Sylvio Carvalho). There are also the romances between Batuca and Camila (Nathália Limaverde) and Guto and Moniquinha (Yana Sardenberg), which is hindered by the poisonous Agatha (Jullie). Marquise Kriseida (Cássia Linhares) also arrives, a great love from Máximo's past and willing to do anything to win him back with the help of Baron João Melaço (Fernando Alves Pinto), who becomes obsessed with Flor. Meanwhile, Flor and Malva discover a clause in the will that they will only receive the inheritance if they manage everything together.

== Cast ==
Character	Portrayed by	Seasons	
Character	Portrayed by	1	2
Maria Flor Miranda (Flor)	Juliana Silveira	Main	Main
Frederico Fritzenwalden (Fred)	Roger Gobeth	Main	
Delfina Torres Bittencourt	Maria Carolina Ribeiro	Main	Main
Malva Torres Bittencourt	Suzy Rêgo	Main	Main
Augusto Fritzenwalden (Guto)	Gustavo Leão	Main	Main
João Pedro Fritzenwalden (JP)	Johnny Massaro	Main	Main
Marta de Sousa (Martinha)	Letícia Colin	Main	Main
Joaquim Fritzenwalden (Joca)	João Vithor Oliveira	Main	Main
Luciano Alamada	Bruno Padilha	Main	Main
Daniel Ramos Garcia (Batuca)	André Luiz Miranda	Main	Main
Leonardo Malta (DiCaprio)	Bruno Miguel	Main	Main
Tatiana Gonçalves (Tati)	Úrsula Corona	Main	Main
Helga Beethoven	Vic Militello	Main	Main
Monica Vasco (Moniquinha)	Yana Sardenberg	Main	Main
Ricardo Pacheco (Pacheco)	Gilberto Hernandez	Main	Main
Adriano Ribeiro	Daniel Ávila	Main	
Bruna Fritzenwalden	Mariah de Moraes	Main	
Matheus Lopes	Igor Cotrim	Main	
Cristina Ramos Garcia (Titina)	Zezé Motta	Main	
Raul Garcia	Paulo Reis	Main	
Corina Bittencourt	Norma Blum	Main	
Julia Flores (Juju)	Eline Porto	Main	
Guilherme	Bernardo Marinho	Main	
Chef Gerard	Gustavo Ottoni	Main	
Amelinha	Suzana Abranches	Main	
Count Máximo Augusto Calderão de Alicante	Mário Frias		Main
Marquise Kriseida de Avelar	Cássia Linhares		Main
Baron João Gusmão Torrão de Melaço	Fernando Alves Pinto		Main
Olívia Fritzenwalden	Julianne Trevisol		Main
Ana Sílvia de Alicante	Débora Olivieri		Main
Agatha Figueiredo	Jullie		Main
Evaristo	Leonardo Cortez		Main
Camila Mourão	Nathália Limaverde		Main

=== Special guests ===
Character	Portrayed by
Dr. Alberto Figueiredo (Figueiredo)	Guilherme Leme
Marcela Ramos	Jaqueline Vargas
Director of the boarding school	Cristina Pereira
Eduardo Miranda	Camilo Bevilacqua
Vladislau	José Steinberg
Jean	Fábio Azevedo
Chuck	Pierre Baitelli
Joana	Adriana Prado
Luli	Priscilla Campos
Shame	Guta Gonçalves
Rouge	Rouge

== Background ==
In 2004, the creator Cris Morena wrote the telenovela Floricienta, inspired by the story Cinderella and the movie The Sound of Music by Robert Wise. Produced by Cris Morena Group in partnership with RGB Entertainment, Floricienta premiered on March 15, 2004, on Channel 13. Starring Florencia Bertotti, Juan Gil Navarro and Fábio Di Tomaso, it aired until December 2, 2005, in Argentina. It was rebroadcast by the Disney Channel and in 2012 by Telefe. In addition to exports, versions were made in several countries, such as Portugal, Chile, Colombia and Mexico.

== Production ==
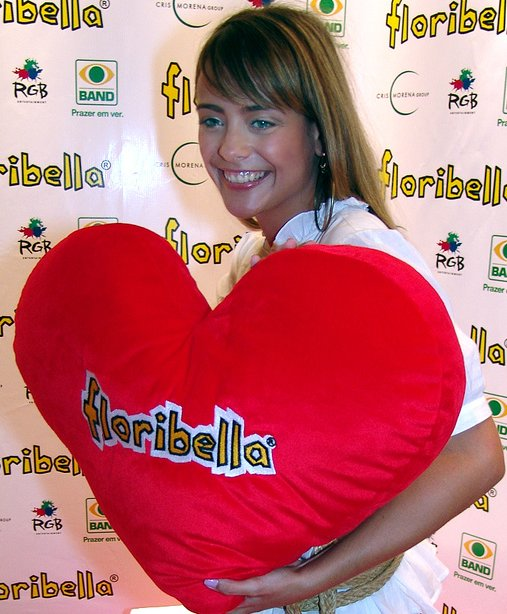
Juliana Silveira during the Floribella press conference.

In August 2004, inspired by the success of the Argentine version and national remakes such as Chiquititas, Rede Bandeirantes announced the production of a Brazilian version of Floricienta, reviving the company's drama department, which had been deactivated since 1998, when it produced Meu Pé de Laranja Lima. Originally, Rede Bandeirantes planned to buy the Argentine version and show it dubbed in Brazil, but the decision was made to produce a Brazilian version. Patrícia Moretzsohn and Jaqueline Vargas, who were collaborators on Malhação, were announced as the authors of the adaptation. Soon after, they announced the Portuguese title, Floribella, formed by combining the words "flor" and "Cinderela".

Each episode cost $35,000 and the complete production grossed $5.3 million. Filming of the first season lasted until October 2005, when the second phase began. Rede Bandeirantes rented the Tycoon studios, located in Barra da Tijuca, and the main filming took place at the Rio de Janeiro Film and Video Center, where 20 sets were built in an area of 1,200 square meters, as well as a scenic street. The aim was to decentralize production, which was mainly based in São Paulo.

=== Casting ===
The casting tests were held on December 11 and 12, 2004 and involved 5,000 candidates, who had to perform an acting scene and sing a song. Around 500 new or well-known actresses fit the profile required for the leading role of Maria Flor. The choice came down to Juliana Silveira, Rafaela Mandelli, Natallia Rodrigues, Fabiana Alvarez and Renata Del Bianco, with Juliana being selected. Maria Carolina Ribeiro was one of the newcomers who tried out for the role of Maria Flor. She was later reassigned to audition for the role of the antagonist Delfina and passed.

For the male lead, the final choice was between Miguel Thiré, Márcio Kieling and Roger Gobeth, who got the job. Suzy Rêgo, who had been out of soap operas for four years, asked Elizabetta Zenatti to audition for the production. Zenatti decided to cast Suzy without auditioning, believing that a well-known actress would enhance the plot and help develop the comedic tone of the antagonist Malva. Gustavo Leão received the confirmation that he had passed the tests on Christmas Eve, when the Rede Bandeirantes team arrived at his house with cameras to record his reaction. Before recording began, a 10-day workshop was held to help the actors adapt to the world of children's drama.

== Screening ==
Floribella was originally due to premiere on March 14, 2005, on Rede Bandeirantes, but was postponed to April 4. Aired from Monday to Friday at 8.10 p.m. after Jornal da Band, it was rated free for all audiences. The last chapter was shown on November 25, 2005, making a total of 169 chapters. Afterwards, a special with the best moments was broadcast. With a renewed contract with RGB, Rede Bandeirantes produced a second season, which aired from January 23 to August 12, 2006, with 173 episodes from Monday to Saturday. Counting both series, the production had a total of 344 chapters, making it one of the longest in the history of Brazilian television. The opening of the first season was broadcast to the sound of "Floribella", its title song, which was included in the first soundtrack; in the second season, the theme was "É pra você meu coração", included in Floribella 2: É pra você meu coração. Both are adaptations of Floricienta produced by Rick Bonadio.

Floribella was also shown on the Disney Channel from October 16, 2006, to June 8, 2007, in the first season and from June 2, 2008, to January 30, 2009, in the second season. Internationally, it was aired by Band Internacional. There have been rumors of a third season. In this case, the continuation would need unadapted writing, since Floricienta has only had two series. Rede Bandeirantes and RGB discussed the possibility, but it didn't materialize. After it ended, Rede Bandeirantes rebroadcast the first season between November 5, 2007, and June 17, 2008, in the 14:15 slot. The ratings were low, so it was moved to 1.50 p.m. The first season of the show became available on the Netflix streaming service on July 2, 2015.

It was rebroadcast for the second time on Rede Bandeirantes from September 15, 2020, to May 17, 2021, in 175 chapters, 15 years after the original airing, replacing the Portuguese drama Ouro Verde and being replaced by the new drama Nazaré at 8:20pm. As with the first rerun in 2007, only the first season was broadcast.

== Music ==
In order to release the records for the telenovela, Rede Bandeirantes signed an agreement with Universal Music. In total, five albums were released, two studio albums, two live albums and one remix and karaoke album. The first album launched was Floribella on June 6, 2005. The album features voices from the protagonist Juliana Silveira and the antagonist Maria Carolina Ribeiro, with a special guest appearance from Gustavo Leão. The album was inspired by the original Floricienta y Su Banda, released in 2004 in Argentina. The album sold 55,000 copies in the first 45 days after its release and reached fifteenth on the best-selling albums of 2005. Initially certified as a gold record for selling 100,000 copies, which Juliana received on stage at Sabadaço, the album received a platinum record from the Brazilian Association of Record Producers (ABPD) for total sales of 170,000 copies. Silveira received the certificate on the Band Vida stage.

The title song "Floribella" ranked among the most downloaded ringtones on cell phones in July 2005 with more than 90,000 copies sold; after the end of the first season, 320,000 ringtones had been bought. The first DVD, entitled Floribella: Ao Vivo, was recorded on September 18, 2005, in São Paulo and received a gold certification from ABPD, ranking 18th in the top 20 best-sellers of 2005. The show was aired on Rede Bandeirantes a day after it took place. The second album released was Floribella 2: É para você meu coração, on March 20, 2006, which contains thirteen songs, twelve inspired by the Argentine original and one unreleased, "País das águas". In the same year, Floribella: Remixes + Karaoke was released, with remixes and karaoke of all the songs from Floribella 2. Floribella, o Musical was recorded from a live show at Tom Brasil, in São Paulo, and became the last phonographic edition of the telenovela. Overall, the telenovela sold 25,500 CDs per audience point.

== Release and repercussions ==
=== Audience ===
Rede Bandeirantes' target for Floribella was 3 points; in Greater São Paulo, the premiere reached 3.5 points. It averaged around 3 points during the first two months of broadcasting. After that, the audience increased and it reached third place in the Brazilian Institute of Public Opinion and Statistics (IBOPE) measurement, beating Jornal da Record. On August 2, 2005, it reached 6 points; the last chapter of the first season set a record with 7 points.

The first weeks of the second season maintained the same ratings as the end of the first with 5 and 7 points. However, RecordTV launched a second telenovela slot with Cidadão Brasileiro at 8:30 p.m. on March 13, 2006, creating drama competition for Floribella, which led to lower ratings for the second season than for the first. On the premiere of Cidadão Brasileiro, Rede Bandeirantes scored 3 audience points, while its competitor averaged 15, with peaks of 23. The problem persisted throughout the season. The show ended with satisfactory ratings for the broadcaster, with an average of 4 points, double that of Meu Pé de Laranja Lima.

=== Retrospective evaluation ===
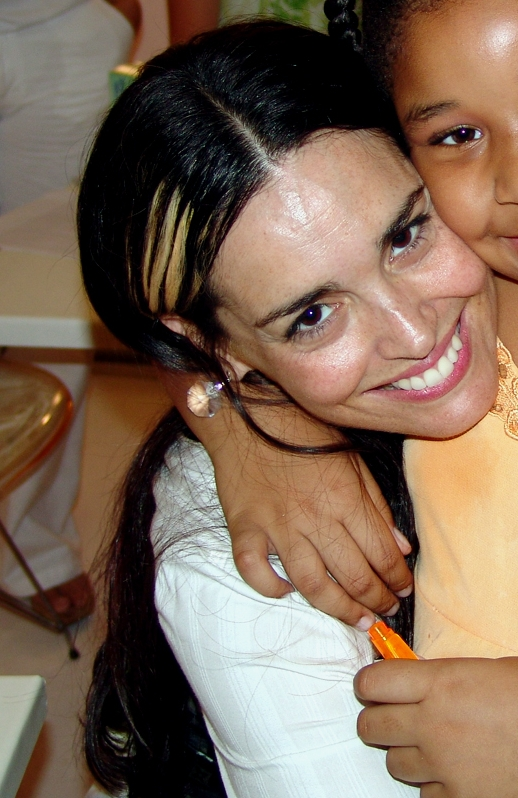
Suzy Rêgo was praised by O Globo reporter Elizabete Antunes, saying that "her 17 years in the profession make the difference in Floribella."

During the first week of showing Floribella, journalists from Jornal do Brasil evaluated it negatively and equated it with the telenovela Malhação: "Judging by the first two chapters, it's far from being a musical, at least in the sense that this word takes on in cinema [and] it's a bit difficult to know [for] which audience [it's aimed at]." Ana Beatriz Corrêa, from the same newspaper, stated that "the romantic comedy is a modern version of the Cinderella fable, in which the crystal slipper has been replaced by colorful sneakers." Journalist Thomas Villena said: "[In Floribella], the sets are poor, the script doesn't help (it's childish and banal), the actors, for the most part, don't know how to act, the direction is insecure and the result couldn't be worse [...] as a children's fable, it should win over children and teenagers, but as a soap opera, it doesn't have the text or actors to compete with the others."

Ricardo Valladares, from Veja magazine, exposed the quality of Brazilian teledramaturgy outside TV Globo and cited Floribella as an example to Rede Bandeirantes: "From actors to cameras, there is a certain euphoria among soap opera professionals today. The 9 points [of Rede Record's Essas Mulheres] are well above the network's average [and Band], for its part, has managed to double its average audience with Floribella, in which it invested 5 million dollars in association with an Argentine producer." Elizabete Antunes, from O Globo, commented: "If a large part of the cast [of Floribella] is as young in age as it is in career, there is a team that goes against the grain. Or rather, they can point the inexperienced ones in the right direction." Keila Jimenez, from O Estado de S. Paulo, said: "[it's] full of clichés, [...] abandoned children, princes charming and Manichaeism." Dolores Orosco from IstoÉ commented that Juliana Silveira "has the makings of a children's presenter".

=== Products and sales ===
Initially, Rede Bandeirantes spent R$8 million on sponsorship quotas, such as the commercial companies Casas Bahia, Petrobrás, RGB Entertainment and Kopenhagen (Brazil). The soundtrack began with a CD in Spanish and Portuguese, which sold 55,000 copies in 45 days. During the first few weeks of its release, it remained fourth on the bestseller list. José Antonio Éboli, president of Universal Music, commented: "What surprises us is the speed of sales. It's an album that will sell half a million copies by the end of the year because it appeals to children." Keila Jimenez, from O Estado de S. Paulo commented: "The next season of the show, which premieres next year, will bring more and more products. CDs, DVDs and a line of beauty and hygiene products are in the plans of the broadcaster, which insists that the soap opera has come to pave the way for other plots at Band. But none as lucrative, Band already knows."

Úrsula Corona, who played Tatiana, was cast to present the show O Diário de Floribella during the second phase of the show. In the program, she would show questions and jokes related to the history of Floribella. A year after the start of the show, the sticker album sponsored by Panini Comics sold 6 million envelopes. Sneakers, dolls, sneakers and puzzles were also licensed. The protagonist's doll sold more than 50,000 copies. The Bamba Floribella shoe, produced in partnership with Alpargatas, was one of the leading products in the TV series and was advertised during the plot and commercials. It sold more than 415,000 pairs. In 2006, the publishing house Landscape launched As Aventuras de Floribella, a book based on the soap opera and composed of eight unpublished stories never shown on TV.

=== Awards and nominations ===
Floribella received ten nominations for the 8th Contigo! TV Awards. Patrícia Moretzsohn and Jaqueline Vargas were placed in the Best Author and Best Soap Opera categories; Elizabetta Zenatti was nominated for Best Director; Lulu Arreal, for Best Costume Design; Juliana Silveira, for Best Actress; Maria Carolina Ribeiro, for Breakthrough Actress; Isabella Cunha represented the Best Child Actress category; Roger Gobeth, the Best Actor category and Gustavo Leão was placed for Breakthrough Actor. Juliana Silveira and Roger Gobeth's characters, Maria Flor and Fred, were also nominated for Best Romantic Couple.

== See also ==
- Lola: Once Upon a Time
- Floribella
