= Meu Pé de Laranja Lima (film) =

1970 film directed by Aurélio Teixeira

- Directed by: Aurélio Teixeira
- Written by: Braz Chediak; Aurélio Teixeira
- Produced by: Herbert Richers
- Starring: Júlio César Cruz; Aurélio Teixeira; Leilane Chediak
- Cinematography: Hélio Silva
- Music by: Edino Kruger
- Release date: 1970
- Running time: 95 minutes
- Country: Brazil
- Language: Portuguese

Meu Pé de Laranja Lima (My Sweet Orange Tree) is a 1970 Brazilian drama film, based on the novel of the same name. Directed by Aurélio Teixeira, is the first film adaptation of the novel by José Mauro de Vasconcelos.

== Plot ==
A poor village boy has a single friend — an orange tree, to whom he trusts his little secrets. But not all trees are destined to live long.
