= Pic Nick Band =

Pick Nick Band, also simply known as Pic Nick, was an evening programming block on Rede Bandeirantes that existed from October 2 to December 30, 2006. Broadcast in the 8-9pm slot, it aired selected Nickelodeon series which Band had the rights to air.

== History ==
With the end of Floribella, the network decided to create a solution to keep its children's audience afloat by creating a dedicated children's strand from 8:10pm to 9pm, in order to preserve the core audience of the telenovela. For this end, a partnership with Nickelodeon was announced and Pic Nick Band was set up, with young actress Daniela Marcondes presenting the studio-based wraparound segments. The studio segments, as well as information on the series featured on the strand, were also available on the network's website.

== Programming ==
On weekdays at launch, the program featured Hey Arnold! and the live-action series Unfabulous. On Saturdays, the strand was occupied by the Nickelodeon seasons of Doug and The Angry Beavers. At a later phase, the live-action slot was replaced by Clarissa Explains it All and Zoey 101.
