= Rogério Márcico =

Brazilian actor (born 1930)

- Born: 24 February 1930 (age 95); Poços de Caldas, Minas Gerais, Brazil
- Occupation(s): Actor, voice actor
- Years active: 1949–2015
- Spouse: Maria Prudenciana de Oliveira
- Children: 2

Rogério Márcico (born 24 February 1930) is a Brazilian actor. He has been in various television and film roles, as well as having dubbed for various foreign films and TV shows, having played in various networks.

Márcico was born on 24 February 1930 in Poços de Caldas. He is most known for his performances on 1980's O Meu Pé de Laranja Lima as Paulo; the TV adaptation of The Devil to Pay in the Backlands as Titão Passos; Chiquititas, where he played Dr. José Ricardo, and as the villain Pereirinha in SBT's As Pupilas do Senhor Reitor from 1994 to 1995.

In 2010, he returned to Rede Globo to play Ciro Bevilláqua alongside Selton Mello on the series A Cura. In 2011, he was invited to make a guest appearance in the SBT-produced Amor e Revolução, by Tiago Santiago. In 2015, he came to be the protagonist in the Gloob kids' TV series Buuu - Um Chamado para a Aventura.

Márcico is the actor with the most performances on SBT productions, appearing in more than 13 series from the broadcaster.

== Filmography ==
=== Television ===
Year	Title	Role	Note
2015	Buuu - Um Chamado para a Aventura	Vô Reginaldo	
2011	Amor e Revolução	Augusto Fiel	Guest appearance
2010	A Cura	Ciro Bevilláqua	
2008	Água na Boca	Alfredo Vecchio	
2007	Maria Esperança	Otávio Camargo	
2004	Seus Olhos	Gregório	
2004	Meu Cunhado	Dr. Justo Madeira	Episode: "Meus Direitos"
2003	Jamais Te Esquecerei	Samuel	
2001	Amor e Ódio	Juvêncio (Juca)	
1997	Chiquititas	Dr. José Ricardo Almeida Campos	Season 1
1996	O Rei do Gado	Olegário Rangel	
1995	Sangue do Meu Sangue	Tobias Barreto	
1995	As Pupilas do Senhor Reitor	Pereirinha	
1988	Vida Nova	Amadeu	
1988	Chapadão do Bugre	Carício	
1987	Direito de Amar	Raimundo	
1987	Caso Especial		Episode: O Caso do Martelo
1986	Selva de Pedra	Chico	
1985	Grande Sertão: Veredas	Titão Passos	
1984	Jerônimo	Coronel Valdomiro Seixas	
1984	Meus Filhos, Minha Vida	Pascoal	
1983	Vida Roubada	Afonso de Albuquerque Rosas	
1983	Pecado de Amor	Amadeu	
1980	Meu Pé de Laranja Lima	Paulo	
1980	Pé de Vento	Alfredo	
1979	Gaivotas	Álvaro	
1978	Roda de Fogo	Bianco	
1977	Éramos Seis	Alonso	
1976	Papai Coração	Diogo	
1976	O Julgamento	Frei Carlos	
1976	Canção para Isabel	Dr. Carlos	
1975	Vila do Arco	Padre Lopes	
1975	O Velho, o Menino e o Burro	Castro	
1974	O Machão	Batista	
1972	O Leopardo	Odilon	
1972	Os Fidalgos da Casa Mourisca	Tomé da Póvoa	
1971	Sol Amarelo	Zé Touro	
1971	Os Deuses Estão Mortos	Coronel Jordão	
1970	As Pupilas do Senhor Reitor	José	
1969	Era Preciso Voltar	Eugênio	
1969	Algemas de Ouro	Brandini	
1968	O Terceiro Pecado		
1967	Os Fantoches	Fernando	
1966	A Pequena Karen	Ernesto	
1966	Anjo Marcado	Juju	
1966	As Minas de Prata	Vaz Caminha	
1965	O Ébrio	Rogerinho	
1964	Melodia Fatal		
1961	A Muralha		
1957	Os Três Mosqueteiros	Aramis	
1957	Grande Teatro Tupi		Episode: Mortos sem Sepultura
1956	O Contador de Histórias		
1955	TV de Vanguarda	Various roles	1955-1957

=== Film ===
Year	Title	Role
2011	Onde está a Felicidade?	Seu Cézar
1974	Regina e o Dragão de Ouro	

== Dubbing ==
- Augie Doggie and Doggie Daddy - Augie Doggie (1st voice)
- The Flintstones - Barney Rubble (1st voice)
- The Jetsons - Henry Orbit (2nd season)
- Vertigo - Henry Jones
- Gandhi - John Gielgud
- Earthquake - John Randolph
- The Wiz - Ted Ross
- Dracula - Laurence Olivier
