= Ícaro Silva =

Brazilian actor

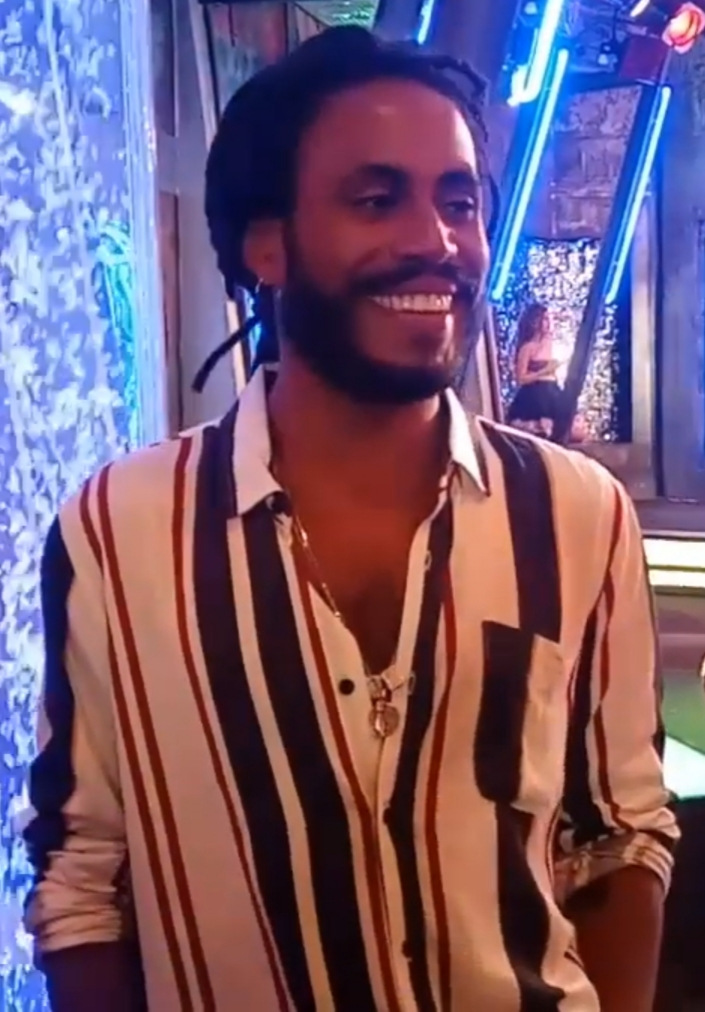
- Born: 19 March 1987 (age 39); São Bernardo do Campo, Brazil
- Occupations: Actor, singer, model, writer
- Years active: 1998–present

Ícaro Silva (São Bernardo do Campo, 19 March 1987) is a Brazilian actor, musician, model, and writer. At age 8, he published his first book, Três Historinhas de Ícaro Silva (1995), followed by O Peixe Dourado (1996) and Aventuras de Geva (1998). He began acting at age 11 in the telenovela Meu Pé de Laranja Lima in 1998 on Band. Ícaro gained prominence in theater in musicals such as Rock in Rio – O Musical, Elis, A Musical (where he played the singer Jair Rodrigues, a role he reprised in the film Elis), and playing the singer Wilson Simonal in the musicals S'Imbora, o Musical – A História de Wilson Simonal, and Show em Simonal. In 2017, the actor gained national prominence by participating in and winning the Show dos Famosos segment of the Domingão do Faustão program. In 2018, he debuted his own musical, Ícaro and the Black Stars. In 2019, he voiced Simba in the Brazilian version of The Lion King.

== Early life ==
Born in São Bernardo do Campo, Ícaro was raised in Diadema, São Paulo. He is the son of Josefa Silva, a former cleaning lady and civil servant, and Zedequias Silva, a security guard. Ícaro has a sister four years older, Marta.

At age 8, he made his first TV appearance on the Rede Globo program Fantástico due to the heavy rains of 1995, which caused the shack where the boy lived in Diadema to be at risk of collapsing. The TV appearance moved Marcia Eleane Braghini, director of a private school in the region, who offered Ícaro a full scholarship. Ícaro's mother took her son to acting auditions.

== Career ==
At age 6, Ícaro began his writing career and wrote his first book, Três Historinhas de Ícaro Silva, which was released in 1995 when he was 8 years old. He then published the books O Peixe Dourado in 1996, and As Aventuras de Geva in 1998.

As a child, he acted in the soap operas Vidas Cruzadas (2000) on Record, and Pequena Travessa (2002) on SBT. In 2003, he played Pedro Pereira in the first season of the TV Cultura series Galera.

Between 2004 and 2007, he played Rafa in the teen series Malhação on TV Globo, a role that brought him national recognition. In 2007, Ícaro participated in the 3rd season of the Dança no Gelo segment on the Domingão do Faustão program. Between 2009 and 2010, he was the presenter of the children's program TV Globinho on Rede Globo. He also made appearances in Globo series such as Casos e Acasos, Na Forma da Lei, Batendo Ponto and Os Caras de Pau. In 2013, he played the character Arthur in the telenovela Joia Rara on Rede Globo.

Between 2013 and 2016, he acted in the musical Rock in Rio – O Musical, where he played two roles, Marvin, and the singer Gilberto Gil. In 2014, the actor played detective Sherlock Holmes in the play 221B Baker Street. Between 2014 and 2015, he played the singer Wilson Simonal in the musical S'Imbora, o Musical – A História de Wilson Simonal. The musical attracted more than 100,000 spectators to Brazilian theaters. Ícaro returned to play the singer in another musical, Show em Simonal, which premiered at the Teatro Leblon on 12 August 2016.

Between 2013 and 2016, he stood out playing the singer Jair Rodrigues in the theater with the musical Elis, A Musical, a role he reprised in the film Elis, released in 2016. In 2016, he played Dr. Paulo in the film Sob Pressão by Andrucha Waddington. In 2017, he participated in the first season of the Show dos Famosos segment on the Domingão do Faustão program, in which he was the winner and received many accolades for his performances. In the same year, he was cast in the telenovela Pega Pega in the role of Dilson. Also in 2017, he played Fábio in the series Edifício Paraíso on the GNT channel.

In 2018, Ícaro debuted his own musical, Ícaro and the Black Stars, where he performs songs by Michael Jackson, Bob Marley, Tim Maia, Wilson Simonal, Beyoncé, and James Brown. That same year, he played the musician Skunk in Legalize Já – Amizade Nunca Morre, a biopic of the band Planet Hemp. Between 2018 and 2019, he played Mercuccio in the play Romeu e Julieta – O Musical, inspired by the work of William Shakespeare. In 2019, he played the lambada singer Ticiano in the telenovela Verão 90 on Globo. He also played Capitão, one of the main characters in the Netflix series, Girls from Ipanema (2019). That same year, he also voiced the character Simba in Disney's The Lion King.

In 2020, he played Gabriel in the film Música para Morrer de Amor, and also acted as Silvio in the Globo series, Todas as Mulheres do Mundo. In 2021, he acted in Gracinha, a visual album by singer Manu Gavassi released on the Disney+ streaming platform. He also played the model Joseph in the telenovela Verdades Secretas II, on Globoplay. In 2022, Ícaro played his first telenovela villain in Globo's Cara e Coragem.

== Personal life ==
In 2018, the actor was injured by bullet fragments while driving through the Zuzu Angel Tunnel after a police checkpoint in Rio de Janeiro. Ícaro said that he later learned that all the shots fired at his car were fired by the police.

In 2019, Ícaro stated that he identifies with the LGBTQ community. He said in an interview with the newspaper O Globo:

I consider myself sexually free and that means I identify with LGBTIQ. I see myself as open to sexualities and genders, I don't see myself labeled [with any letter]. There's the letter I, but I'm the I of Ícarosexual [laughs]. There's an attempt to label people and each of us is an individual force. My sexuality is only mine, it's important that we understand ourselves as individual power.

In March 2022, he began dating singer IZRRA. In January 2024, Ícaro announced, via a comment on Instagram, the end of the relationship.
