= Juliana Silveira =

Brazilian actress and singer

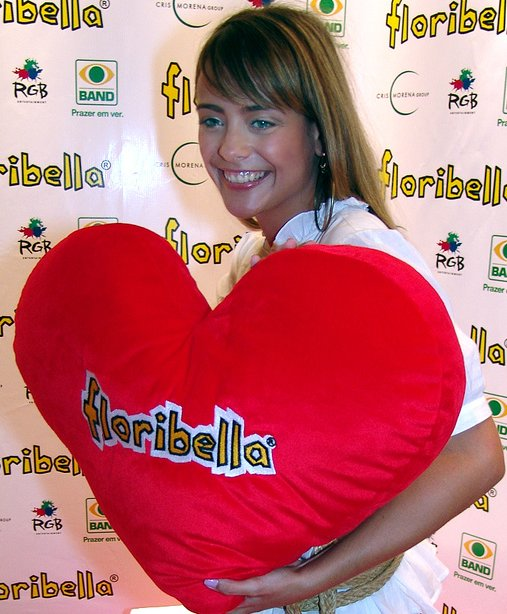
- Born: Juliana Bragança Saúda Silveira; March 12, 1980 (age 46); Santos, Brazil
- Occupations: Actress, singer

Juliana Bragança Saúda Silveira, known as Juliana Silveira (born March 12, 1980) is a Brazilian actress and singer. She began her acting career on Malhação, a Brazilian telenovela aimed at teenagers.

== Biography ==
In 2005, Juliana starred in Floribella, a musical soap opera for children, and recorded songs for its soundtrack.

== Television ==
=== Telenovela ===
Year	Film	Role	Notes
1998	Pecado Capital	Dagmar	
1998–1999	Você Decide		various roles
2000–2001	Laços de família	Patrícia Campos (Patty)	Supporting role
2001	Brava Gente	Branca Luz	
2002	O Quinto dos Infernos	Rosalva	
2002–2003	Malhação	Julia Miranda	Seasons 9-10
2005–2006	Floribella	Maria Flor Miranda	Main role
2007	Luz do Sol	Nina Lins Alburquerque (Lukstar)	Supporting role
2008–2009	Chamas da Vida	Carolina Monteiro Azevedo de Castro	Main role
2012–2013	Balacobaco	Isabel Vilela	Main role
2014–2015	Vitória	Priscila Schiller	Antagonist
2016–2017	A Terra Prometida	Rainha Kalési	Supporting role
2017	Dancing Brazil	Participant	1st Season
2017	Apocalipse	Raquel Santero Sardes	Special appearance

== Music career ==
Soundtrack

Title	Details
Floribella	Released: July 6, 2005; Label: Universal; Format: Digital download, CD
Floribella 2	Released: March 3, 2006; Label: Universal; Format: Digital download, CD

Remix

Title	Details
Floribella: Remix + Karaokê	Released: July 7, 2006; Label: Universal; Format: Digital download, CD

Live

Title	Details
Floribella Ao Vivo	Released: December 7, 2005; Label: Universal; Format: Digital download, DVD
Floribella: O Musical	Released: September 2, 2006; Label: Universal; Format: Digital download, CD
