= Polícia 24h =

- Current logo
- Genre: Reality television
- Created by: Diego Guebel
- Based on: COPS
- Directed by: Mariano Feijoo; Pablo Mazover; Juan Jose Buezas
- Country of origin: Brazil
- Original language: Portuguese
- No. of seasons: 7

Production
- Producer: Diego Barredo
- Camera setup: Multi-camera
- Running time: 120 minutes
- Production companies: Eyeworks (seasons 1—6); Shed Media (season 7)

Original release
- Network: Rede Bandeirantes; A&E
- Release: May 6, 2010—present

Related
- E24

Polícia 24h or Polícia 24 Horas (English: 24 Hour Police) is a Brazilian reality show that shows the police actions carried out by the Military Police of São Paulo. The program was created by a partnership between Cuatro Cabezas and Rede Bandeirantes. As the season progressed other departments from other regions of Brazil also appeared on the show. Cable network A&E also broadcasts the reality show. In December 2014, it left Rede Bandeirantes' programming schedule, being reprised in 2015 as a cover-up in the primetime slot.

On March 24, 2016, the reality police was renewed for a seventh season, featuring corporations across the whole country. As of season seven, the format is under property of Shed Media, Warner Bros.' subsidiary. It is the Brazilian version of COPS, broadcast in Brazil by truTV.

== Plot ==
Cameramen are witness to the work of the professionals at the moment they are called. No make-up, no actors, no fictitious stories: the protagonists of Police 24h are the community and the Police, in a series where despite the goal being the general welfare, the story doesn't always end well.

The program also proposes a faithful record of the work of the police; what their members do in their free time and their relationship with their family, population and co-workers.

It also offers a panorama of the Police career, from the beginning until the moment they retire and cease to exercise the function from so many years. Each of them is part of a family, always hoping for the best to happen.

== Audience and ratings ==
The show used to rank third in the measurement of IBOPE for the Metropolitan Region of São Paulo. Currently the audience reaches around only 3 points. Its peak was reached on October 21, 2010 when it showed the action of the Ostensive Rounds Tobias Aguiar department. It achieved 7 points.

== See also ==
- Reno 911!
