= Retiro dos Artistas =

- Formation: August 13, 1918; 107 years ago
- Headquarters: Rio de Janeiro, Brazil
- Coordinates: 22°56′01.2″S 43°21′25.0″W
- President: Stepan Nercessian
- Vice president: Zezé Motta
- Website: retirodosartistas.org.br

Retiro dos Artistas (in English: "Artists' Retreat") is a Brazilian institution that provides shelter and support for elderly artists who face financial hardship, emotional distress, abandonment by family, or homelessness. It is located in the Pechincha neighborhood, in Rio de Janeiro's West Zone. The institution has been home to well-known musicians such as Airto Moreira, Flora Purim, and Robertinho Silva, as well as actors celebrated for their work in film, television, and theater, including Paulo César Pereio and Edyr de Castro.

== History ==
In the early decades of the 20th century, theater and other art forms in Brazil often received support from European entrepreneurs, particularly Portuguese. However, with the outbreak of the First World War, Europe plunged into an economic crisis. Many of the businesspeople who had supported Brazilian and foreign artists living in Brazil were forced to cut expenses. As a result, many artists were left without support.

In 1915, a group of theater company owners, led by Leopoldo Fróes, initiated the first attempt to organize an institution to aid elderly and unemployed artists who could no longer rely on the informal pensions previously paid by these entrepreneurs. The inspiration came from the Maison de retraite des artistes de Pont-aux-Dames, founded in 1903 by Coquelin aîné, president of the Association de secours mutuels des artistes dramatiques, an institution established by Baron Isidore Taylor.

== Characteristics ==
The institution is a 15,000 m^{2} complex with 50 houses, a dining hall, a theater, a cinema, a library, a swimming pool, and a beauty salon. It serves dozens of residents, including actors, singers, musicians, producers, costume designers, makeup artists, and other entertainment professionals. Its operations depend on donations of money, clothing, food, household appliances, and furniture, as well as volunteer work. Residents receive meals, undergo physical therapy, and even enjoy beauty salon services. They also produce and exhibit their work at an on-site cultural center and offer classes for beginners in the performing arts.
