= Meu Pé de Laranja Lima (TV series) =

Meu Pé de Laranja Lima (My Sweet Orange Tree) is a 1998 Brazilian telenovela, produced by Rede Bandeirantes between December 7, 1998 and April 2, 1999, in 101 chapters.

Based on the book of the same name, by José Mauro de Vasconcelos, it was written by Ana Maria Moretzsohn, with collaboration from Dayse Chaves, Izabel de Oliveira, Maria Cláudia Oliveira and Vera Villar, under the general direction of Henrique Martins . It was the third adaptation, after the 1970 version by TV Tupi and the 1980 version by Bandeirantes itself.

== Cast and characters ==
Actor	Character
Caio Romei	Zezé
Gianfrancesco Guarnieri	Manuel Valadares (Portuga)
Flávia Pucci	Jandira
Fernando Pavão	Raul
Genézio de Barros	Paulo
Eliana Guttman	Estefânia
Cris Bonna	Cecília
Karla Muga	Glória (Godoia / Glorinha)
Rodrigo Lombardi	Henrique
Regiane Alves	Lili
André Cursino	Diogo
Sebastião Campos	Caetano
Sueli Oliveira	Eugênia
Lu Grimaldi	Don'ana
Lui Strassburger	Gabriel
Helen Helene	Santinha
Miwa Yanagizawa	Gilda
Rafael Pardo	Totoca
Vancley Pimentel	Luis
Ícaro Silva	Juvenal
Talita Cantori	Vavá
Bruno Bezerra	Sérgio "Serginho" Villarica
Fausto Maule	Bernardo
Jacqueline Dalabona	Heloísa Villarica
Ícaro Silva	Juvenal
Leonardo Medeiros	Demétrio
Gabriela Brito	Biluca
Malu Pessin	Letícia
Eduardo Conde	João Pedro/Armando
Danieli Ávila	Rita (Ritinha)
Maristane Dresch	Sofia
Cássio Scapin	Minguinho
