= O Meu Pé de Laranja Lima (1970 TV series) =

1970 Brazilian telenovela

O Meu Pé de Laranja Lima (English: My Sweet Orange Tree) is a Brazilian telenovela, produced by Rede Tupi from November 30, 1970 to August 30, 1971.

It is the first television adaptation of the novel of the same name by José Mauro de Vasconcelos. It was written by Ivani Ribeiro and directed by Carlos Zara.

A huge success with the public, the story captivated viewers, received several awards and had a good audience.

== Cast and characters ==
- Eva Wilma .... Jandira
- Cláudio Corrêa e Castro .... Manuel Valadares (Portuga)
- Sílvio Rocha .... Paulo
- Lélia Abramo .... Estefânia
- Haroldo Botta .... Zezé
- Bete Mendes .... Glória (Godóia)
- Analu Graci .... Lili
- Carlos Zara .... Raul
- Dennis Carvalho .... Henrique
- Fausto Rocha .... Diogo
- Ivan Mesquita .... Caetano
- Nicette Bruno .... Cecília
- Gianfrancesco Guarnieri .... Ariovaldo
- Jacyra Sampaio .... Eugênia
- Edgard Franco .... Ricardo
- Abrahão Farc .... Padre Rosendo
- Henrique Martins .... Comendador Vicente Del Nero
- Luís Carlos de Moraes .... Túlio
- Ana Maria Dias .... Helena Del Nero
- Cosme dos Santos.... Narciso
- Dirce Militello .... Santinha
- João José Pompeo .... Gabriel
- Terezinha Cubano .... Gilda
- Douglas Mazzolla .... Luisinho
- Gessy Fonseca .... Leonor
- Régis Monteiro .... Sabugo
- Genésio Almeida Júnior .... Vavá
- Alexandre Araujo .... Totoca
- Geny Prado .... Nhá Vina
- Vera Nunes .... Diana
- Silvia Lebron .... Irmã Tereza
- Ruthinéia de Moraes .... Madre Celeste
- Renato Consorte .... Padre Juca
