= Braz Chediak =

Brazilian actor, screenwriter and filmmaker

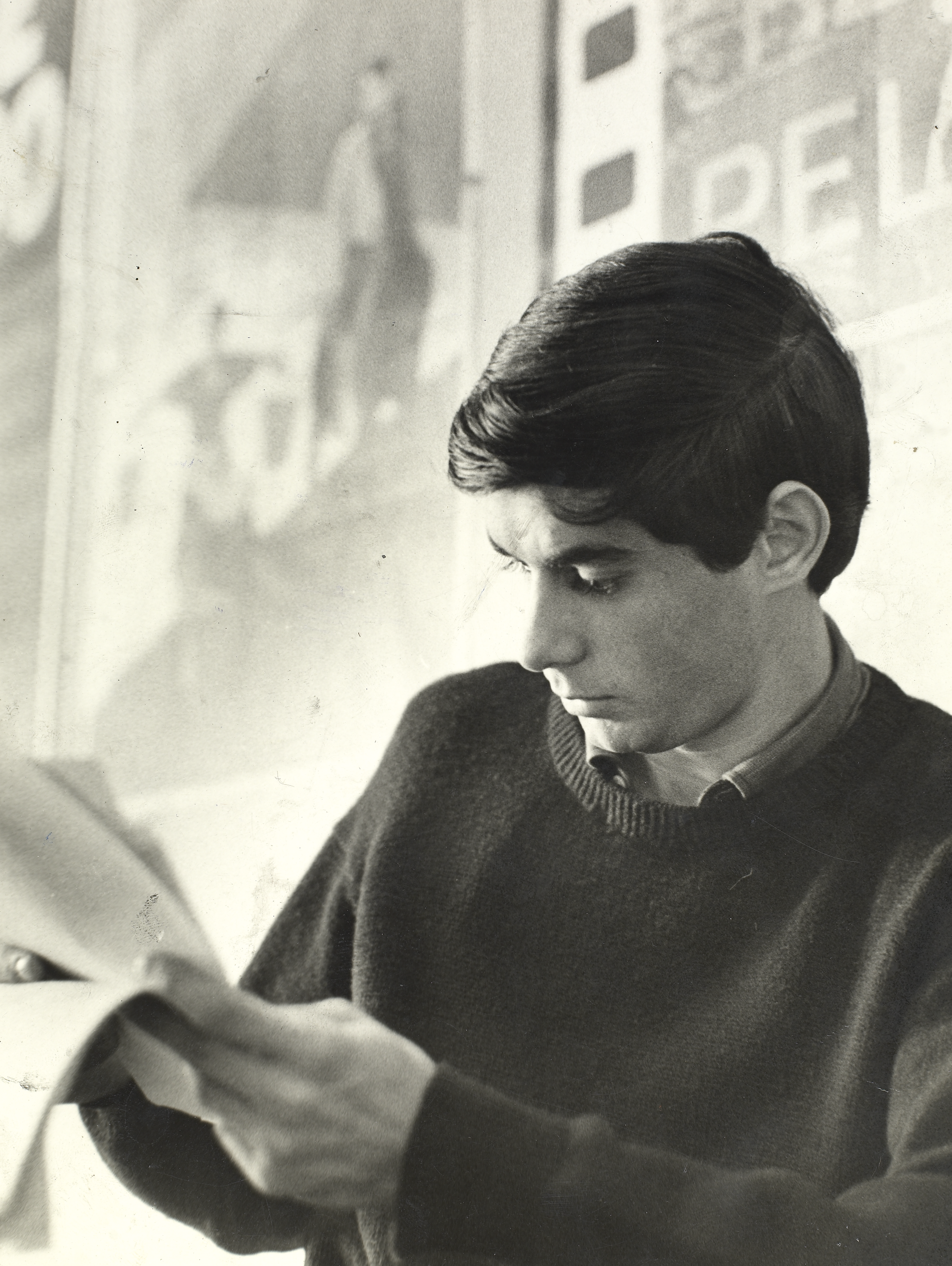
Chediak in 1964

Braz Chediak (born June 1, 1942, in Três Corações) is a Brazilian actor, screenwriter and filmmaker.

With Aurélio Teixeira, he was responsible for the plot and the script of the film Mineirinho, Live or Dead (1967), and the adaptation of Meu Pé de Laranja Lima in 1970. He directed Razor in the Flesh, Two lost in a Dirty Night, Cute But Ordinary and Forgive Me for Betraying Me, and other films.

He has written articles published in several newspapers.

His tale The Golden Bit is published by Editora Record in the anthology Crime Made in Home.

His novel, Cortina de Sangue, is published by Editora Mirabolante and has great critical and public success.
