= Almir Chediak =

Brazilian music producer (1950–2003)

- Born: Almir Santana Chediak; June 21, 1950; Rio de Janeiro, Brazil
- Died: May 25, 2003 (aged 52) Rio de Janeiro, Brazil
- Genres: Bossa Nova, Música popular brasileira, Samba, Jazz
- Occupations: record producer, publisher, teacher, researcher
- Instrument: guitar
- Years active: 1967–2003
- Label: Lumiar Records
- Website: www.lumiar.com.br

Almir Santana Chediak (June 21, 1950 – May 25, 2003) was a Brazilian musical producer, entrepreneur, publisher, guitarist, teacher, composer, writer and researcher.

Almir Chediak was born into a Lebanese immigrant family and grew up on the state of Minas Gerais. He showed an early aptitude for music, starting guitar lessons at 7. As he moved to live in Rio de Janeiro at the age of 13, he started studying guitar under the instructions of reputed guitarist of that time Dino 7 Cordas. Precociously at age of 17, Chediak already began working professionally as a guitar instructor and also scoring soundtracks for films directed by Jece Valadão and others, also writing string and horn arrangements for recording sessions. Still young, he recorded a single with the actress and Belgian model living in Brazil Annik Malvil, introducer of the little tube dress fashion in the 1960s. His students included the likes of Gal Costa, Nara Leão, Cazuza, Tim Maia, Carlos Lyra, and Elba Ramalho, among numerous others.

In 1984, Almir Chediak launched his first book "The Dictionary of Notated Chords" and in 1986 he founded his own publishing house, the "Lumiar Record". At the same year, he launched his second book "Methods of Harmony and Improvisation". Both of his works are widely used in Brazil and have been influential in training the generation of young Brazilian musicians now entering their prime.

In 1988 Almir Chediak introduced the Songbook series of Brazilian Popular Music elaborating the precise transcription of the complete lyrics, melodies and harmonies of leading composers for publication in songbooks establishing a written library to guarantee Brazilian music would survive for future generations to study and enjoy. The idea was born when Chediak was giving guitar lessons to the son of Caetano Veloso in the mid-1980s and found that Veloso was often at a loss to remember what chords he had played or the words he had sung on a particular song. It included the definitive versions of nearly 200 of Veloso's songs.

In 1991, Almir Chediak founded the CD publishing label Lumiar Discos. The Songbooks series was subsequently accompanied by CDs featuring newly recorded interpretations of the selected works by prominent Brazilian popular music artists. Chediak produced these albums, which received recognition for reviving lesser-known compositions and for encouraging artists to record songs outside their customary repertoires or established public styles. By combining annotated songbooks with professionally recorded performances, the project made the repertoire more accessible to musicians, providing standardized harmonic transcriptions that enabled performers in Brazil and abroad to study, play, and interpret the songs with greater consistency.

In all, Chediak edited 18 songbooks, featuring artists like Gilberto Gil, Chico Buarque, Djavan, Noel Rosa and Ary Barroso.

While nearing completion on a songbook retrospective of João Bosco and writing a biography of singer Tim Maia, Chediak was attacked by robbers and was shot to death. He was 52 years old.
