= O Meu Pé de Laranja Lima (1980 TV series) =

1980 Brazilian telenovela

O Meu Pé de Laranja Lima (My Sweet Orange Tree) is a Brazilian telenovevela, produced by Rede Bandeirantes from september 29, 1980 to April 25, 1981.

Based on the novel of the same name by José Mauro de Vasconcelos, it was written by Ivani Ribeiro, directed by Edison Braga and Antonino Seabra and general direction by Waldemar de Moraes.

== Cast and characters ==
- Alexandre Raymundo .... Zezé
- Dionísio Azevedo .... Manuel Valadares (Portuga)
- Rogério Márcico .... Paulo
- Lucélia Machiavelli .... Estefânia
- Baby Garroux .... Jandira
- Fausto Rocha .... Raul
- Cristina Mullins .... Glória (Godoia)
- Lourdes Bicudo .... Lili
- Ivan Lima .... Raul
- Valdir Fernandes .... Henrique
- Dante Rui .... Caetano
- Regina Braga .... Cecília
- Almir das Areias .... Ariovaldo
- Neusa Borges .... Eugênia
- Geny Prado .... Donana
- Sergio Ropperto .... Gabriel Garcia
- Luzia Carmelo .... Santinha
- Jefferson Ricart Pezeta .... Sabugo
- Terezinha Cubana .... Gilda
- Ulisses Bezerra .... Totoca
- Davis Carvalho .... Luisinho
- Eduardo Silva .... Juvenal
- Robien Madrilles Jr .... Vava
- Sergio Ribeiro Ferreira .... Serginho
- Mirka Rubia Sato .... Badu
- Fabio Rodrigues .... Seu Aristides
- Vera Nunes .... Leonor Oliveira
- Wilma De Aguiar .... Madre Celeste
- Henrique Lobo .... a voz do pé de laranja-lima
- Maria Ferreira .... Helena (1)
- Ivanice Silva .... Helena (2)
- Elias Gleizer .... Padre Rosendo
- Ênio Gonçalves ....Comendador Vicente Del Nero
- Paulo Leite .... Santana
- Homero Kossac .... Arcebispo
- Leonardo Camilo .... Diogo
- José Luiz Di Santi .... Dr. Ricardo
