= José Mauro de Vasconcelos =

Brazilian writer

- Born: February 26, 1920 Bangu, Rio de Janeiro, Brazil
- Died: July 24, 1984 (aged 64) São Paulo City, Brazil
- Occupation: Writer

José Mauro de Vasconcelos (February 26, 1920 – July 24, 1984) was a Brazilian writer.

== Biography ==
José Mauro was born in Rio de Janeiro on February 26, 1920. His family was very poor, and when he was still very young, he migrated to Natal where relatives took care of him. Entering the Medical faculty, Mauro abandoned the course of studies in his second year and returned to Rio de Janeiro. There he worked as a boxing instructor and even as a painter's model.

Mauro initiated his literature with the novel Banana Brava. His greatest success was his novel My Sweet Orange Tree (Meu Pé de Laranja Lima) that tells about his own personal experiences and the shocks he suffered in his childhood with the abrupt changes of life. The story centers around little José, a 5-year-old boy who is being raised in a poor family with many brothers and sisters in Bangu, in the state of Rio de Janeiro. Partly because he rarely sees his parents, who are out to work long hours and only come back home at night, José plays all sorts of pranks on his neighbours and friends, leading his older brothers and sisters to think he is a naughty child. He can find little comfort and support in his own family, except from his older sister Gloria, for whom José is a kind of protégé. When moving houses with his family, José finds a little tree of sweet orange in the backyard, which he ignores at first for being too small to climb, but then becomes its friend once he discovers he can actually communicate with the tree. His only other friend is a Portuguese man from Trás-os-Montes called Manuel Valadares.

Mauro was part Indian and part Portuguese. He passed his childhood in Natal. When he was 9 years old, he learned to swim, and with pleasure he still remembers the days when he threw himself into the waters of the Potengi River to train for swimming competitions. Mauro frequently went to the sea. He won many swimming competitions and liked to play soccer and to climb trees. Mauro's first job, from 16 to 17 years old, was as sparring partner of featherweight boxers. He then started working on a farm in Mazomba, carrying bananas, before becoming a fisherman and living on the coastline in Rio de Janeiro. He later moved to Recife, where he became an elementary teacher and taught at a fishermen's center.

As a writer, he had his own methods. First he would choose the settings where the characters would live. Then he would move to these places and do rigorous research. To write the novel Arara Vermelha, Mauro traveled 450 leagues (2,200 km; 1,400 mi) in the wilderness. Next, he would structure the whole novel, determining even the dialogues. He had a memory that allowed him to remember every little detail of his imagined scenario for a long time. "When the story is entirely made in imagination", reveals the author, "is when I begin to write. I only work I have the impression that the novel is exiting from all the pores of the body."

Mauro relates that after finishing writing the first chapter, he passes to the conclusion of the novel, without even elaborating the plot. "That, he explains "because all the chapters are already produced mentally. It is not really important writing a sequence, like alternating the order. In the end everything goes well". Mauro was a cinema actor and worked in films such as Carteira Modelo 19, Fronteiras do Inferno, Floradas na Serra, Canto do Mar (of which he wrote the screenplay), Na Garganta do Diablo, and A Ilha. He won many prizes, such as the Saci prize for best supporting actor, the Saci prize for the best actor of the year, and the Governo do Estado prize for best actor of the year. His novels Arara Vermelha and Vazante were filmed.

== The writer ==
The works of José Mauro de Vasconcelos have achieved public popularity and commercial success, but his work has received limited recognition in Brazil.

The French critic Claire Baudewyns affirms that "ce qui confère aux œuvres de José Mauro de Vasconcelos une poésie particulière née de l'alchimie entre monde réel et monde imaginaire." ("what confers on the works of José Mauro de Vasconcelos a particular poetry, is born of the alchemy between real world and imaginary world", in free translation).

He wrote :

- 1942 : Banana Brava
- 1945 : Barro Blanco
- 1949 : Longe da Terra
- 1951 : Vazante
- 1953 : Arara Vermelha
- 1955 : Arraia de Fogo
- 1962 : Rosinha, Minha Canoa
- 1963 : Doidão
- 1964 : O Garanhão das Praias
- 1964 : Coração de Vidro
- 1966 : As Confissões de Frei Abóbora
- 1968 : O Meu Pé de Laranja Lima (My Sweet Orange Tree)
- 1969 : Rua Descalça
- 1969 : O Palácio Japonês
- 1970 : Farinha Órfã
- 1972 : Chuva Crioula
- 1973 : O Veleiro de Cristal
- 1974 : Vamos Aquecer o Sol
- 1975 : A Ceia
- 1978 : O Menino Invisível
- 1979 : Kuryala: Capitão e Carajá

== Legacy ==
Because it was written in plain language, the book My Sweet Orange Tree became a popular choice for primary schools in Brazil to adopt it in their curricula. It is claimed to be the book that sold the most in that country's literary history. In the first few months of its publication in 1968, this book has sold 217,000 copies.

My Sweet Orange Tree has also been filmed as soap operas and movies in Brazil, including the 1970 film and the April 2013 re-make by director Marcos Bernstein.

After his death, José Mauro de Vasconcelos has given his name to numerous libraries and cultural association all over Brazil, including a library in the city of São Paulo.

In 2015, Google Doodle commemorated his 95th birthday.
