= Eugênio Kusnet =

Brazilian actor (1898–1975)

Evgeniy Shamansky-Kuznetsov (Note: Russian: Евгений Шаманский-Кузнецов) (December 29, 1898 – August 29, 1975), better known as Eugênio Kusnet, was a Russian-born Brazilian actor, stage director, writer, and theatre professor. He is best remembered for introducing the Stanislavski's method to Brazil, as well as training several actors, including Regina Duarte, Lucélia Santos, and Renée de Vielmond.

== Biography ==
Born in Kherson in the Russian Empire, Kusnet studied theatre and singing as a child and was educated at a polytechnical school. He volunteered to fight in the First World War under the Imperial Army, later participating in the Russian Civil War on the side of the White movement. In the 1920s, he worked as an actor in Finland and the Baltics before moving to Brazil, where he initially worked as a tradesman, opening a small plastics factory.

Though interested in the country's theatre since the 1930s, Kusnet began his professional acting career in Brazil later in life, inspired by his contact with the ensemble theatre Os Comediantes, led by Zbigniew Ziembinski. In 1951, he made his debut in the play Paiol Velho, directed by Abílio Pereira de Almeida, gaining attention for his meticulous preparation for roles. That same year he was integrated to the Teatro Brasileiro de Comédia, acting in several plays, including Seis Personagens à Procura de um Autor, directed by Adolfo Celi, and Convite ao Baile, by Luciano Salce.

In 1953, Kusnet, working with the defunct Vera Cruz film studio, debuted in cinema with the film Sinhá Moça. He appeared in another six films, including Tristeza do Jeca, with Mazzaropi.

He then joined the Teatro de Arena, acting in Eles Não Usam Black-Tie, by Gianfrancesco Guarnieri. In 1965, he was awarded the Premio Moliere for his role in the adapted play Os Pequenos Burgueses, written by Maxim Gorky. Around this time, he was already giving private courses in acting. He later traveled through Eastern Europe and attended classes at the Vakhtangov State Academic Theatre.

In 1975, Kusnet published the book Ator e Método, a pedagogical work introducing the reader to the principles of acting. As a professor, Kusnet taught at the University of São Paulo School of Dramatic Arts and at the Pontifical Catholic University of São Paulo.
