= Cyro Del Nero =

Brazilian scenographer and set designer

- Born: December 28, 1931; São Paulo, Brazil
- Died: July 30, 2010 (aged 78); São Paulo, Brazil
- Occupation(s): Scenographer, set designer

Cyro Del Nero (December 28, 1931 – July 30, 2010) was a Brazilian scenographer and set designer. Del Nero worked in the theater, television and film industries for more than 50 years. He was also a professor of theatrical costume and stage design at the University of São Paulo.

Del Nero was born in Brás, a district in São Paulo. He worked as an art director and set director at several Brazilian television networks during his career including Rede Bandeirantes, Rede Globo, Rede Tupi and Rede Excelsior. He was the head art director of the Rede Globo television news magazine, Fantástico, designing many of the sets and the overall look of the show.

In theater, Del Nero worked at the Theatro Municipal of São Paulo and the Teatro Brasileiro de Comédia, collaborating with well-known figures within the Brazilian theater community, including Cacilda Becker, Bibi Ferreira, Antônio Abujamra and Gianfrancesco Guarnieri. In 1962 he was awarded with Prêmio Saci.

Cyro Del Nero died of coronary disease at the Instituto do Coração in São Paulo on July 30, 2010, at the age of 78.
