= A Muralha =

A Muralha may refer to:

- A Muralha (1968 TV series), a Brazilian telenovela
- A Muralha (2000 TV series), a Brazilian historical fiction television series
