= ABC da Greve =

- Directed by: Leon Hirszman
- Written by: Leon Hirszman
- Produced by: Leon Hirszman
- Cinematography: Adrian Cooper
- Edited by: Adrian Cooper
- Release date: 1990
- Running time: 75 minutes
- Country: Brazil
- Language: Portuguese

ABC da Greve is a 1990 Brazilian documentary film by Leon Hirszman, on the strikes of the ABC Region labor movement in the late 1970s.

== Synopsis ==
The film follows the metallurgical workers of the large transnational automobile factories located in the ABC Region, São Paulo in the late 1970s in their struggle for better wages and better living conditions. Filmed in 16 mm, ABC da Greve records the effervescence of the labor movement, which mobilized to carry out the first strikes in Brazil since 1968 and preceded the country's political amnesty and redemocratization.

== Cast ==
- Luiz Inácio Lula da Silva
- Vinicius de Moraes
- Lélia Abramo
- Bete Mendes

== Release ==
Although he started editing the documentary, Hirszman was unable to complete it before his death in 1987.

In addition to being involved in the conclusion of the films They Don't Wear Black Tie and Imagens do Inconsciente, the filmmaker faced difficulties in making ABC da Greve viable as a production of national circulation, which would imply, among other things, to pay for the transformation of the 16mm to a 35mm film.

The post-production process of the documentary was resumed between 1989 and 1990 at the initiative of the Cinemateca Brasileira and led by cinematographer Adrian Cooper, who followed the directions left by Hirszman.

After being finalized, ABC da Greve was shown for the first time in a show organized by Cinemateca itself, in 1991. The film also participated at the Festival de Brasília in that same year.
