= Lélia Abramo =

Italian-Brazilian actress and political activist

- Born: February 8, 1911; São Paulo, Brazil
- Died: April 9, 2004 (aged 93); São Paulo, Brazil
- Occupation: Actress
- Years active: 1958–1994

Lélia Abramo (February 8, 1911 – April 9, 2004) was an Italian-Brazilian actress and political activist.

== Biography ==
Daughter of Italian immigrants, Abramo was born and died in São Paulo, but lived in Italy from 1938 to 1950, suffering through the privations of World War II. Along with her brothers Cláudio Abramo and plastic artist Lívio Abramo she is part of one of the most prominent families in Brazilian history in both politics and the arts.

She participated in the early foundation of the Oposição de Esquerda no Brasil (Left Opposition in Brazil). Along with Mario Pedrosa, she has always been considered a sympathizer of trotskysm. Lélia Abramo was also a militant and was one of the founder of the Partido dos Trabalhadores (Worker's Party) along with Mario Pedrosa, Manuel da Conceição, Sérgio Buarque de Holanda, Moacir Gadotti and Apolônio de Carvalho. She was personally active in many different movements in Brazilian politics like Diretas Já.

Abramo played in 27 telenovelas, fourteen films and twenty four plays, having acted with some of the great names of São Paulo theater, like Gianni Ratto and Gianfrancesco Guarnieri with whom she debuted on stage in the 1958 in Eles não Usam Black-Tie (They don’t wear Black-Tie).

== Awards ==
- 1958 Saci - character Romana - Black-tie
- 1958 Associação Paulista de Críticos de Arte (APCA) - character Romana - Black-tie
- 1958 Governador do Estado - character Romana - Black-tie
- 1958 Círculo Independente de Críticos Teatrais do Rio de Janeiro - character Romana - Black-tie
- 1958 Associação Brasileira de Críticos Teatrais - character Romana - Black-tie
- 1964 Roquete Pinto - SP. All her work in the theater
- 1975 Associação Paulista de Críticos de Arte (APCA). All her work in the Brazilian theater
- 1976 Governador do Estado - Best Actor - character Pozzo in Waiting for Godot

== Filmography and television work ==
- 1990 - A história de Ana Raio e Zé Trovão .... Lúcia
- 1986 - Mania de querer .... Margô
- 1985 - O tempo e o vento .... Bibiana (idosa)
- 1983 - Pão pão, beijo beijo .... Mama Vitória
- 1982 - Avenida Paulista .... Bebel
- 1979 - Pai Herói .... Januária Brandão
- 1976 - O julgamento .... Felícia
- 1975 - Um dia, o amor .... Lucinha
- 1973 - Os ossos do barão - Bianca Ghirotto
- 1972 - Uma Rosa com Amor - Amália
- 1972 - Na idade do lobo
- 1971 - Nossa filha Gabriela .... Donana
- 1970 - O meu pé de laranja lima .... Estefânia
- 1970 - As bruxas .... Chiquinha
- 1969 - Dez vidas
- 1968 - O terceiro pecado
- 1967 - Paixão proibida
- 1966 - Redenção .... Carmela
- 1966 - Calúnia .... Sarah
- 1965 - Um rosto perdido .... irmã Rosa
- 1965 - Os quatro filhos
- 1964 - Prisioneiro de um sonho
- 1964 - João Pão
- 1961 - A Muralha

== Theater ==
- 1958 - Teatro de Arena - SP - Romana in Eles Não Usam Black-Tie de Gianfrancesco Guarnieri
- 1959 - São Paulo SP - Gente como a Gente
- 1960 - São Paulo SP - Mother Courage de Brecht
- 1961 - São Paulo SP - Raízes
- 1961 - São Paulo SP - Pintado de Alegre
- 1961 - São Paulo SP - Oscar
- 1961 - São Paulo SP - Os Rinocerontes
- 1962 - São Paulo SP - Yerma
- 1962 - São Paulo SP - As Visões de Simone Machard
- 1963 - São Paulo SP - Os Ossos do Barão
- 1964 - São Paulo SP - Vereda da Salvação
- 1965 - São Paulo SP - Os Espectros
- 1968 - São Paulo SP - Lisístrata
- 1968 - São Paulo SP - Agamêmnon
- 1969 - São Paulo SP - Romeu e Julieta
- 1975 - São Paulo SP - Ricardo III
- 1977 - São Paulo SP - Pozzo em Esperando Godot de Samuel Beckett. Direção Antunes Filho
- 1985 - Rio de Janeiro RJ - Mother - Brecht

== Cinema ==
- 1994 - Mil e Uma
- 1992 - Manôushe
- 1983 - Janete
- 1981 - Eles Não Usam Black-Tie
- 1979 - Maldita Coincidência
- 1975 - Joanna Francesa
- 1974 - O Comprador de Fazendas
- 1970 - Beto Rochfeller
- 1970 - Cleo e Daniel
- 1968 - O Quarto
- 1967 - O Caso dos Irmãos Neves
- 1967 - O Anjo Assassino
- 1964 - Vereda de Salvação
- 1960 - Cidade Ameaçada
