= Pai Herói =

- Genre: Telenovela
- Created by: Janete Clair
- Directed by: Gonzaga Blota; Wálter Avancini; Roberto Talma
- Starring: Tony Ramos; Elizabeth Savalla; Paulo Autran; Glória Menezes; Carlos Zara; Rosamaria Murtinho; Cláudio Cavalcanti; Lélia Abramo; Maria Fernanda; Jonas Bloch
- Country of origin: Brazil
- Original language: Portuguese
- No. of episodes: 178

Production
- Running time: 50 minutes

Original release
- Network: TV Globo
- Release: 29 January – 18 August 1979

Pai Herói is a Brazilian telenovela produced and broadcast by TV Globo. It premiered on 29 January 1979 and ended on 18 August 1979, with a total of 178 episodes. It's the twenty second "novela das oito" to be aired on the timeslot. It is created and written by Janete Clair and directed by Gonzaga Blota, Wálter Avancini and Roberto Talma.

== Plot ==
André Cajarana was raised under the illusion that his father was a great man. When his grandfather, with whom he lived, dies, he leaves for Rio de Janeiro to shed light on his father's death, who was considered a criminal, and clear him of the accusation of stealing land and killing a priest. The main obstacle is Bruno Baldaracci, a mafia businessman, the person most involved in the infamy, his father's former partner, now married to his mother, Gilda.

Carina is a famous ballerina, raised in a traditional and wealthy family, the Limeira Brandãos, led by the domineering matriarch Dona Januária. To take over the family business, the unscrupulous César marries Carina, even though she is a single mother. After they separate, Carina meets and falls in love with André, who obtains power of attorney from her to manage the family business, in a plot that leads to César's murder.

== Cast ==
- Tony Ramos - André Cajarana
- Elizabeth Savalla - Carina (Catarina Limeira Brandão)
- Paulo Autran - Bruno Baldaracci (Nuno)
- Glória Menezes - Ana Preta (Ana Maria Garcia)
- Carlos Zara - César Limeira Reis
- Rosamaria Murtinho - Valquíria Brandão
- Cláudio Cavalcanti - Gustavo Gurgel (Benedito da Conceição)
- Lélia Abramo - Januária Brandão
- Maria Fernanda - Gilda Baldaracci
- Jonas Bloch - Rafael Baldaracci
- Flávio Migliaccio - Genésio Camargo
- Jorge Fernando - Cirilo Baldaracci
- Fernando Eiras - Romão Baldaracci
- Dionísio Azevedo - Seu Garcia (Nestor Garcia)
- Beatriz Segall - Norah Limeira Brandão
- Emiliano Queiroz - Horácio Brandão
- Lícia Magna - Adélia
- Osmar Prado - Pepo (Pedro Varella)
- Nádia Lippi - Aline Gonçalves
- Paulo Gonçalves - Leôncio Gonçalves
- Ana Lúcia Ribeiro - Lena Camargo
- Sônia Regina - Jenny (Genivalda Garcia Baldaracci)
- Fernando José - Mário Renner
- Carlos Kroeber - Dr. Tiago
- Ivan Cândido - Reginaldo Brandão
- Yara Lins - Irene Brandão
- Nildo Parente - Haroldo Brandão
- Suzana Faini - Jussara Brandão
- Reinaldo Gonzaga - Hilário Brandão
- Thaís de Andrade - Odete Brandão
- Monah Delacy - Eugênia Brandão Reis
- Hélio Ary - Dr. Soares
- Maria Helena Dias - Filhinha (Felipa Baldaracci)
- Maria Helena Velasco - Mirtes Camargo
- Manfredo Colassanti - Pietro Baldaracci
- Rejane Marques - Clara Baldaracci
- Rogério Bacelar - Gil (Gilberto Baldaracci)
