= Praça das Esculturas =

Sculpture park in São Paulo, Brazil

Sculpture Square
- Praça das Esculturas
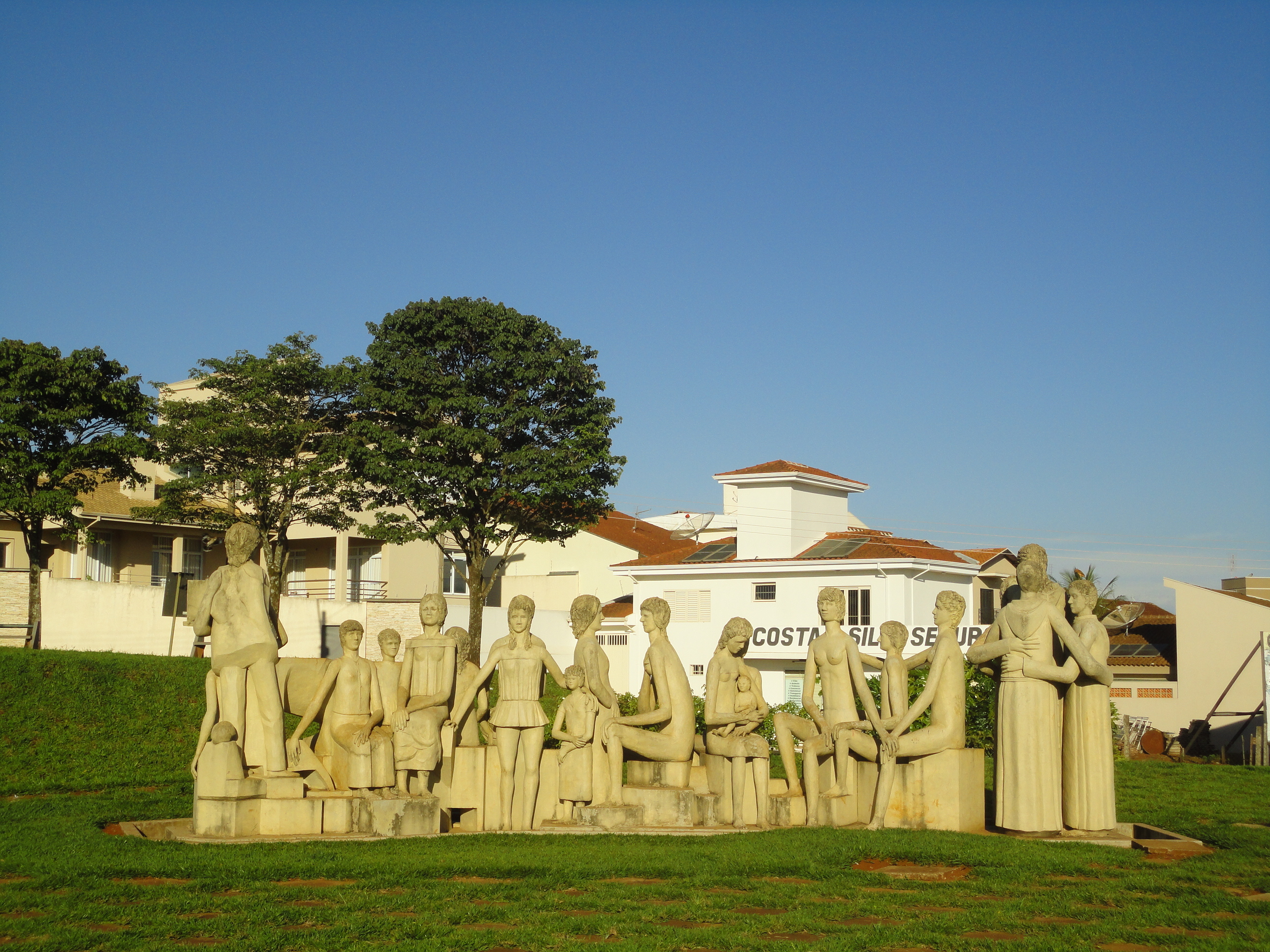
- Women Assembly
- Interactive map of the Sculpture Square area

General information
- Location: Altinópolis, Brazil
- Coordinates: 21.021634°S 47.370606°W
- Construction started: 1990
- Completed: 1992

Design and construction
- Architect: Bassano Vaccarini

Praça das Esculturas (Portuguese: Sculpture Square), also known as O Jardim das Esculturas ou Praça das Esculturas de Vaccarini, is a sculpture park in Altinópolis, in the state of São Paulo, Brazil. The park houses the works of the Italian-Brazilian artist Bassano Vaccarini (1914 - 2002). Praça das Esculturas, which opened in 1992, covers 7,000 square metres (75,000 ft^{2}) at the highest point of the city.

Vaccarini emigrated to Brazil in 1946 after WW2 and worked as a set designer for the Teatro Brasileiro de Comédia. In 1980 he opened a studio in Altinópolis and the municipality became home to his works, which are primarily in concrete and depict women and families. In the design of the park Vaccarini grouped 42 sculptures on seven thematic monuments.
