= Diná Silveira de Queirós =

Brazilian writer

- Born: Dinah Silveira Ribeiro; November 9, 1911; São Paulo
- Died: November 27, 1982 (aged 71); Rio de Janeiro
- Occupation: writer

Dinah Silveira Ribeiro (also known as Diná Silveira de Queirós; November 9, 1911 – November 27, 1982), was a Brazilian writer of novels, short stories, and chronicles. She received the Machado de Assis Prize.

== Biography ==
Silveira de Queirós was born on November 9, 1911, in São Paulo. She published her main works between 1939 and 1955. Silveira de Queirós was a Machado de Assis Prize laureate and the "second woman to be elected to the Brazilian Academy of Letters". She died November 27, 1982, in Rio de Janeiro. Her novel A Muralha was the basis for the 1968 telenovela A Muralha and for the 2000 television series A Muralha.

In 1961, she was widowed by her first husband. In 1962, she was appointed cultural attaché at the Brazilian Embassy in Madrid, and soon after married again to diplomat Dário Moreira de Castro Alves, with whom she moved to Moscow, in the then Soviet Union. During this period, she wrote chronicles that were later included in the 1969 volume Café da Manhã. In 1964 she returned to Brazil, to return to Europe again two years later, settling in Italy. Dinah died on November 27, 1982, in the city of Rio de Janeiro.

== Selected works ==
- 1939 - Floradas na Serra, novel
- 1941 - A Sereia Verde, short stories
- 1949 - Margarida La Rocque, novel
- 1951 - As Aventuras do Homem Vegetal, children's fiction
- 1954 - A Muralha, novel
- 1956 - O Oitavo Dia, play
- 1957 - As Noite do Morro do Encanto, short stories
- 1960 - Era Uma Vez Uma Princesa, biography
- 1960 - Eles Herdarão a Terra, short stories
- 1965 - Os Invasores, novel
- 1966 - A Princesa dos Escravos, biography
- 1968 - Verão dos Infiéis, novel
- 1969 - Comba Malina, short stories
- 1969 - Café da Manhã, chronicle
- 1974 - Eu Venho, Memorial do Cristo I
- 1977 - Eu, Jesus, Memorial do Cristo II
- 1979 - Baía de Espuma, children's fiction
- 1981 - Guida, Caríssima Guida, novel

=== Co-authored works ===
- 1960 - Antologia Brasileira de Ficção-científica, short stories
- 1961 - Histórias do Acontecerá, short stories
- 1962 - O Mistério dos MMM, novel
- 1962 - Quadrante 1, chronicle
- 1963 - Quadrante 2, chronicle
