= Lauro Escorel =

Brazilian cinematographer and film director

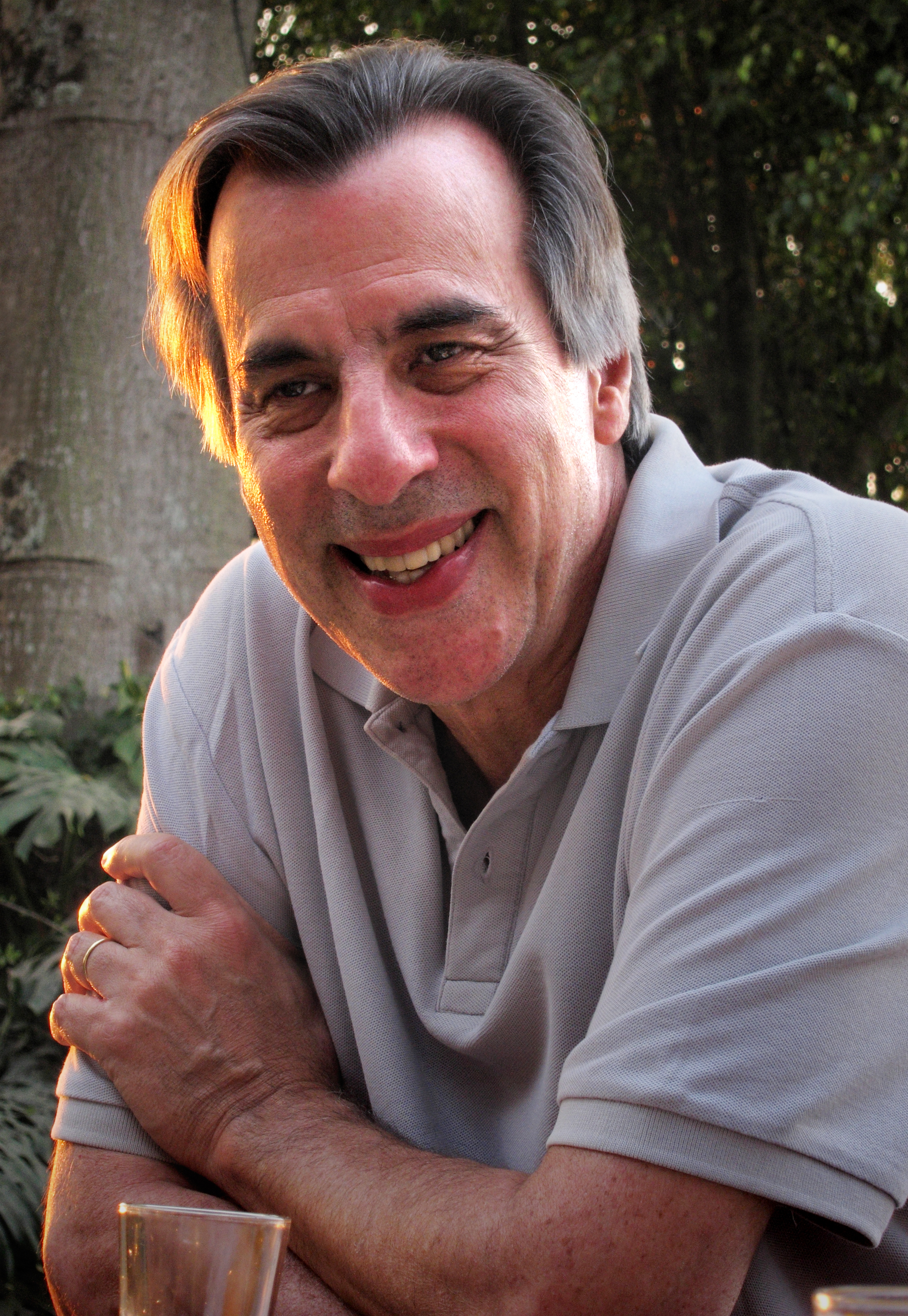
- Lauro Escorel
- Born: Lauro Escorel Filho; January 5, 1950 (age 76); Washington, DC, United States
- Occupation: Cinematographer
- Years active: 1971–present
- Relatives: Eduardo Escorel (brother)

Lauro Escorel Filho (born January 5, 1950), most known as Lauro Escorel, is an American-born Brazilian cinematographer and film director. He was born during his father, a Ministry of External Relations, stay in Washington, DC. He first worked as an assistant to Dib Lutfi and Affonso Beato, and made his debut in 1971 on Leon Hirszman's São Bernardo, which won Gramado Film Festival Best Cinematography Award.

He directed the short film Libertários, winner of Margarida de Prata Award from the National Conference of Bishops of Brazil, in 1976. In 1978, he would win again the Gramado Film Festival Best Cinematography Award for his work on Héctor Babenco's Lúcio Flávio, o Passageiro da Agonia. His first feature film, Sonho sem Fim, won the Jury Special Award at the 1986 Gramado Film Festival. Ironweed (1987), another Babenco's film, would make him more known internationally.

== Selected filmography ==
- All Nudity Shall Be Punished (1973)
- Lucio Flavio (1977)
- Colonel Delmiro Gouveia (1978)
- Bye Bye Brasil (1979)
- They Don't Wear Black Tie (1981)
- Quilombo (1984)
- Love Me Forever or Never (1986)
- Ironweed (1987)
- At Play in the Fields of the Lord (1991)
- Amelia Earhart: The Final Flight (1994)
- Foolish Heart (1998)
- A Hidden Life (2001)
- Maids (2001)
- A Samba for Sherlock (2001)
- The Greatest Love of All (2006)
- Baptism of Blood (2006)
- Casa da Mãe Joana (2008)
- O Contador de Histórias (2009)
- Casa da Mãe Joana 2 (2013)
