= Mauro Mendonça =

Brazilian actor (born 1931)

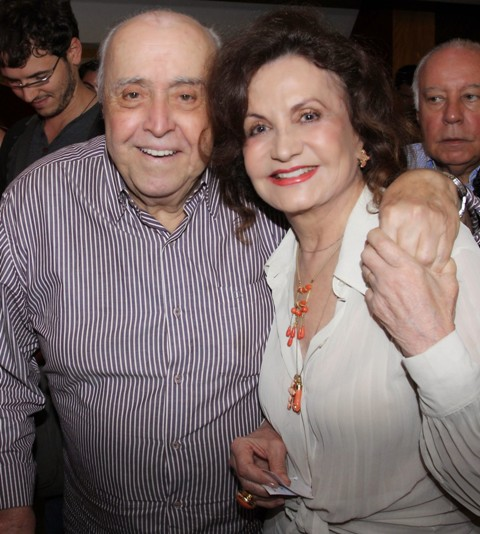
- Mendonça with his wife in 2015
- Born: April 2, 1931 (age 95); Ubá, Minas Gerais, Brazil
- Occupation: Actor
- Years active: 1955–2016
- Spouse: Rosamaria Murtinho (m. 1959)
- Children: 3, including Mauro Filho

Mauro Mendonça (born April 2, 1931) is a Brazilian actor. Born in Ubá, he started his career in 1955 in the Teatro Brasileiro de Comédia. He debuted in the 1963 TV Excelsior telenovela Corações em Conflito. He went on to act on Rede Record and TV Tupi before moving to Rede Globo in 1973, where he continues to practice acting.

He has been married to fellow actress Rosamaria Murtinho since 1959, and has three children: director Mauro Mendonça Filho, actor Rodrigo Mendonça, and musical producer João Paulo Mendonça. He also has five grandchildren: Vitória, Anna, Pedro, Sofia and Januária.

== Selected filmography ==
- Carnaval em Caxias (1954)
- O Petróleo é Nosso (1954)
- Rio, 100 Degrees F. (1955) as Italian tourist at the Sugar Loaf
- Dona Violante Miranda (1960) as Firmino
- Seara Vermelha (1964)
- A Muralha (1968–1969, TV Series) as Dom Braz Olinto
- O Descarte (1973) as Aguiar
- Maria... Sempre Maria (1973)
- Dona Flor and Her Two Husbands (1976) as Dr. Teodoro Madureira
- Estúpido Cupido (1976–1977, TV Series) as Armando Siqueira
- Nos Embalos de Ipanema (1978) as Patrícia's father
- Love Strange Love (1982) as Dr. Benicio / politician
- Doce Delírio (1983) as Armando
- Natal da Portela
- Kuarup (1989) as Gouveia, minister
- A Grande Arte (1991) as Policeman
- Sonho Meu (1993–1994, TV Series) as Carlos
- Anjo Mau (1997–1998) as Rui Novaes
- Meu Bem Querer (1998–1999) as Bilac Maciel
- A Muralha (2000, TV Mini-Series) as Dom Braz Olinto
- O Quinto dos Infernos (2002, TV Mini-Series) as Archbishop Melo
- Benjamim (2003) as Dr. Campoceleste
- Didi, o Cupido Trapalhão (2003) as Dr. Poleto
- Cabocla (2004, TV Series) as Coronel Justino
- Redeemer (2004) as Noronha
- O Profeta (2006–2007, TV Series) as Francisco
- A Favorita (2008–2009, TV Series) as Gonçalo Fontini
- Ti Ti Ti (2010–2011, TV Series) as Giancarlo Villa
- O Astro (2011, TV Series)
- Gabriela (2012, TV Series) as Manoel das Onças
- Êta Mundo Bom! (2016, TV Series) as Dr. Inácio Xavier
- Tô Ryca! (2016) as Odair
