= Altinópolis =

- Municipality
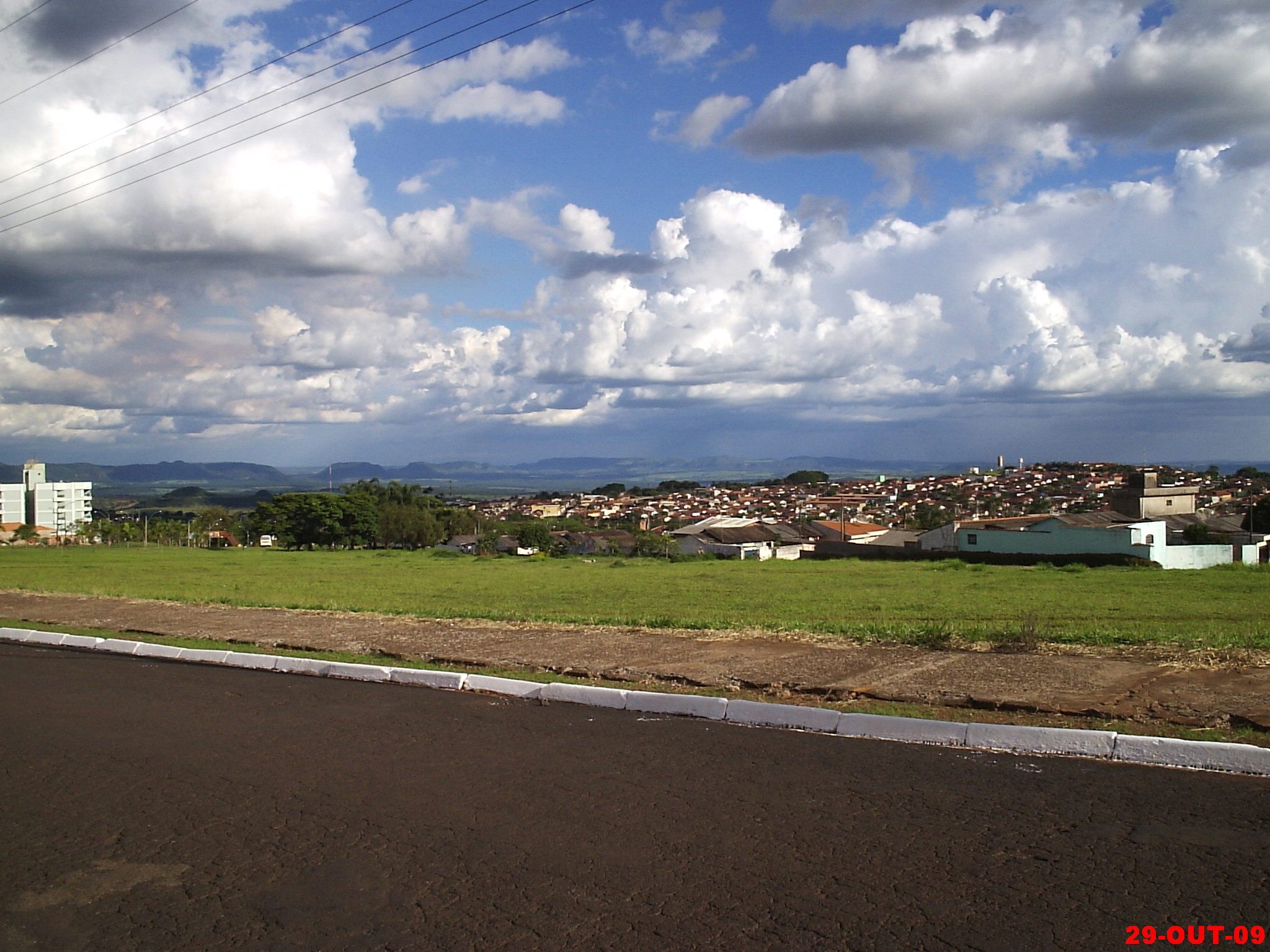

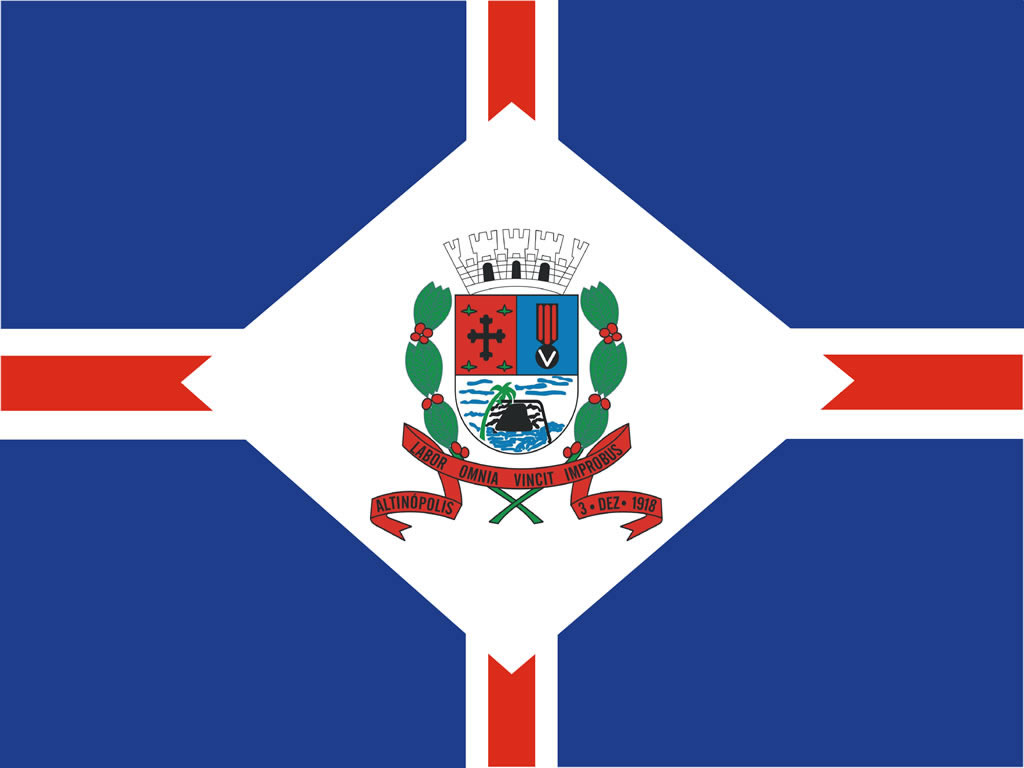
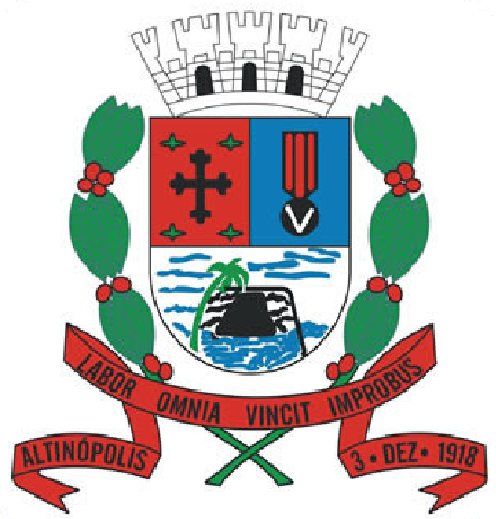
- Flag Coat of arms

- Location in São Paulo state

- Location in Brazil
- Coordinates: 21°1′23″S 47°22′22″W
- Country: Brazil
- Region: Southeast
- State: São Paulo

Government
  - Mayor: José Roberto Ferracin Marques (2017-2020) (PSD)

Area
  - Total: 929 km^{2} (359 sq mi)
- Elevation: 1,200 m (3,900 ft)

Population (2020)
  - Total: 16,203
  - Density: 17.4/km^{2} (45.2/sq mi)
- Time zone: UTC−3 (BRT)
- Postal code: 14350-000
- Area code: +55 16
- Website: www.altinopolis.sp.gov.br

Altinópolis is a Brazilian municipality in the state of São Paulo. The population is 16,203 (2020 est.) in an area of 929 km^{2} (359 sq mi). The city is known for its sights, like the Praça das Esculturas, and its wide variety of caves and waterfalls.

== Geography ==
=== Climate ===
Climate data for Altinópolis, elevation 806 m (2,644 ft), (2016–2021)
Month	Jan	Feb	Mar	Apr	May	Jun	Jul	Aug	Sep	Oct	Nov	Dec	Year
Mean daily maximum °C (°F)	30.0 (86.0)	29.9 (85.8)	29.9 (85.8)	28.9 (84.0)	26.8 (80.2)	26.1 (79.0)	26.3 (79.3)	28.2 (82.8)	31.7 (89.1)	31.0 (87.8)	29.5 (85.1)	30.0 (86.0)	29.0 (84.2)
Daily mean °C (°F)	25.0 (77.0)	24.8 (76.6)	24.6 (76.3)	23.3 (73.9)	21.3 (70.3)	20.6 (69.1)	20.2 (68.4)	21.8 (71.2)	25.0 (77.0)	24.9 (76.8)	24.1 (75.4)	24.6 (76.3)	23.3 (74.0)
Mean daily minimum °C (°F)	19.9 (67.8)	19.7 (67.5)	19.4 (66.9)	17.8 (64.0)	15.7 (60.3)	15.1 (59.2)	14.1 (57.4)	15.4 (59.7)	18.4 (65.1)	18.9 (66.0)	18.7 (65.7)	19.3 (66.7)	17.7 (63.9)
Average precipitation mm (inches)	255.6 (10.06)	213.8 (8.42)	164.9 (6.49)	60.1 (2.37)	51.8 (2.04)	35.3 (1.39)	4.7 (0.19)	16.9 (0.67)	35.5 (1.40)	169.7 (6.68)	215.1 (8.47)	229.5 (9.04)	1,452.9 (57.22)
Average precipitation days (≥ 1.0 mm)	18.8	17.3	14.5	6.2	4.7	3.0	1.3	4.3	4.2	13.8	14.7	18.2	121
Source: Centro Integrado de Informações Agrometeorológicas

== Demographics ==
Historical population (municipality)
Year	Population	%±
1920	8,823
1940	10,154	15.1%
1950	10,339	1.8%
1960	10,901	5.4%
1970	10,819	−0.8%
1980	12,743	17.8%
1991	13,642	7.1%
2000	15,481	13.5%
2010	15,607	0.8%
2022	16,818	7.8%

== Tourism ==
Altinópolis has five rivers and 35 waterfalls. One of them is 72 meters high.

There are eight caves regularly visited by tourist, highlighted by the Itambé Cave with a façade of 28 meters and some 350 meters of galleries. The Department of Tourism gives visitors the necessary information and support. The ranking of the city was high in the last Hall of São Paulo Tourism.

For those interested in art, there are the works of Vaccarini Bassano (1914 - 2002).

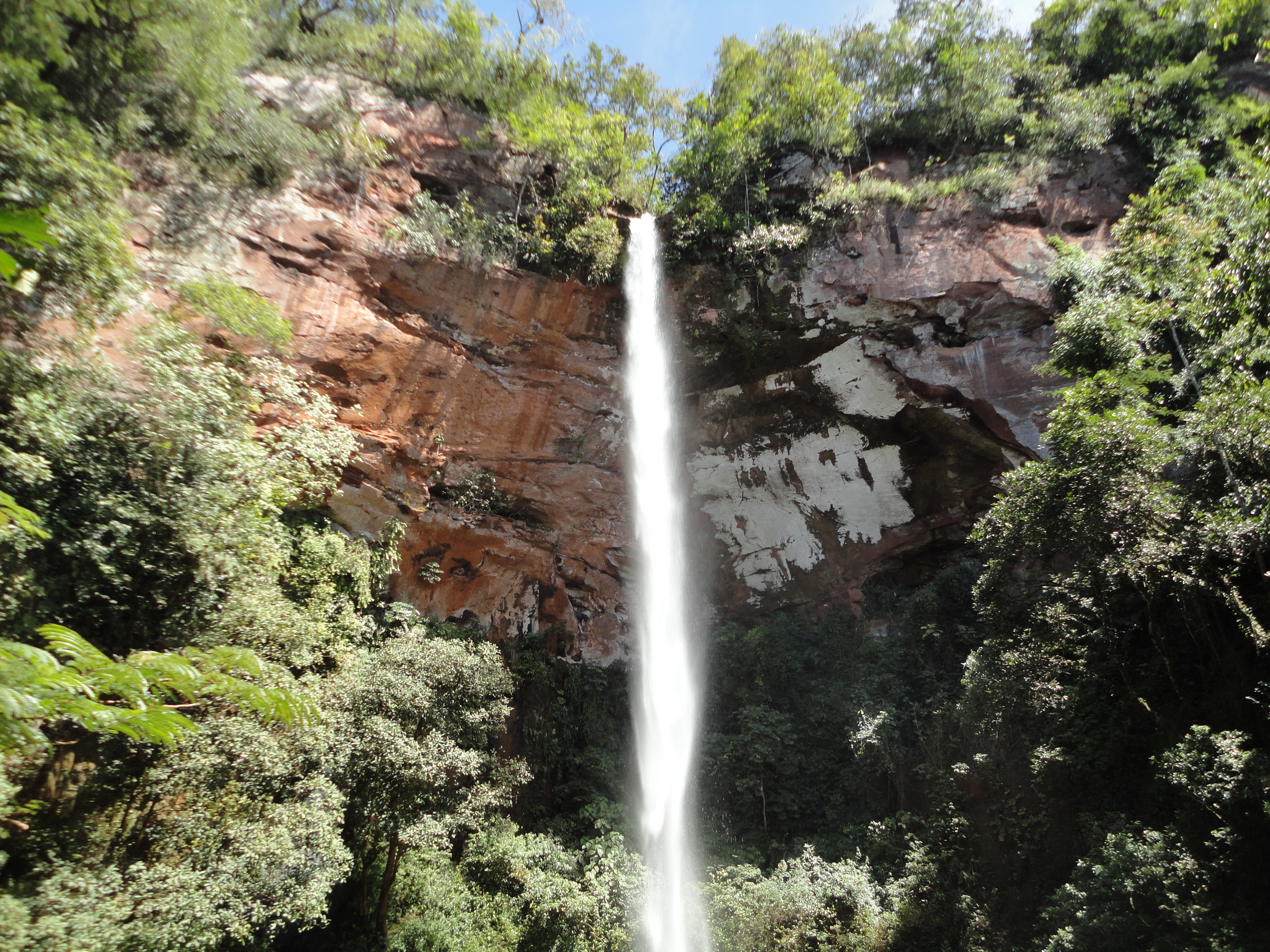
Itambé's Waterfall in Altinópolis

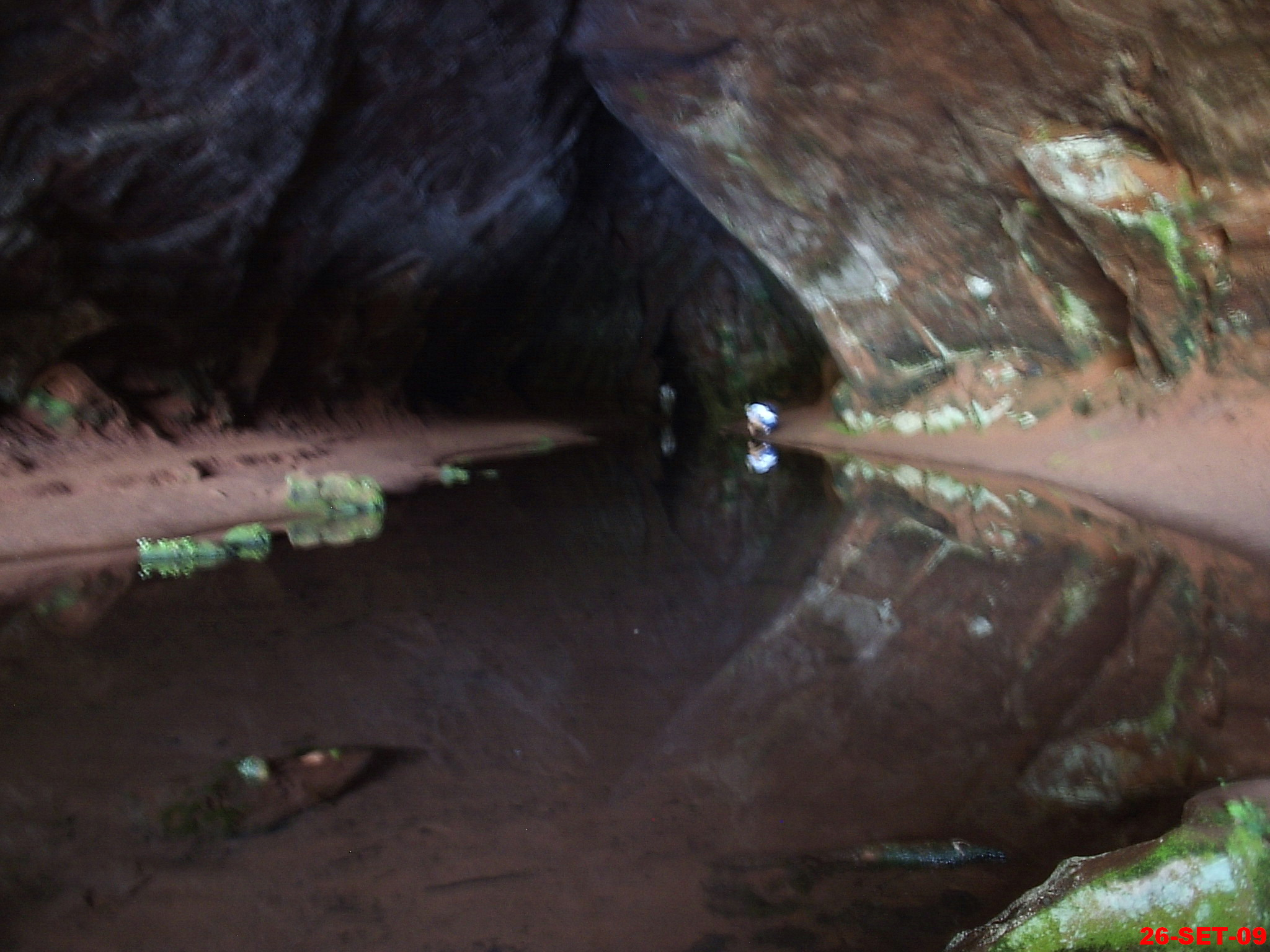
Itambé Cave

=== Bassano Vaccarini sculpture park ===
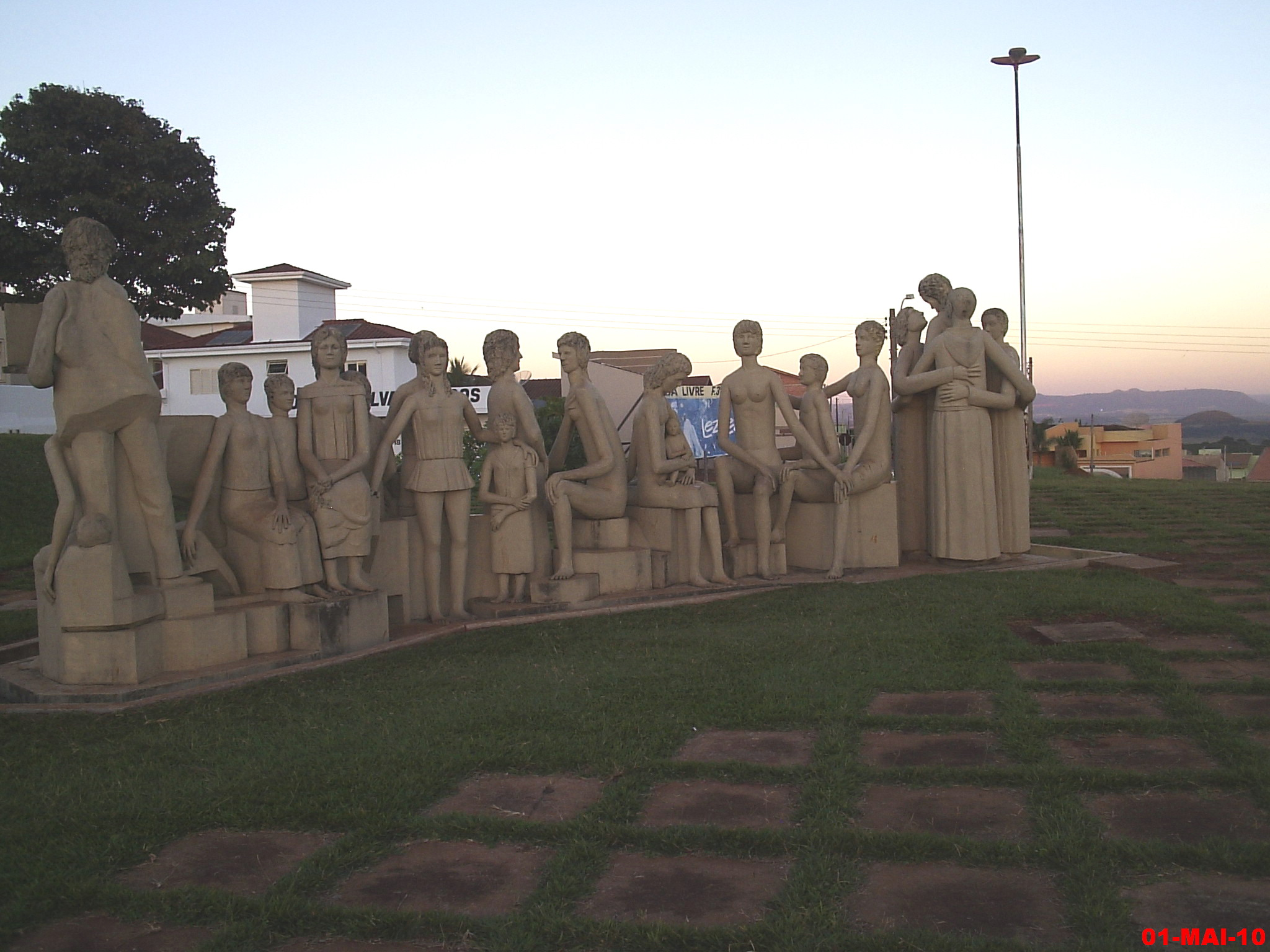
Sculptures of Vaccarini Bassano

Altinópolis is home to a large group of sculptures of Bassano Vaccarini (1914-2002). He was born in Milan, Italy and arrived in Brazil after World War II and chose Altinópolis for his workshop in 1980. Praça das Esculturas (Sculpture Square), which covers 7,000 square metres (75,000 ft^{2}) at the highest point of the city, houses 42 of Vaccarini's works. The sculpture park opened in 1992.

Besides being a professor of Visual Arts at FAU-USP (São Paulo) and Unaerp (in Ribeirao Preto, where he lived), it was a costume designer, set designer, director of the Brazilian Comedy Theater.

=== Folia de Reis Festival ===
Every February there is a gathering of traditional groups that keep alive the dance and singing to the grace of the three wise eastern kings . The festival itself is one of the few traditional religious meetings, and carries the unique elements of this regional expression. The festivity is held in front of the city's cathedral, usually in the second week of February.

== See also ==
- List of municipalities in São Paulo
- Interior of São Paulo
