= Guerra dos Sexos =

Guerra dos Sexos may refer to either of two Brazilian telenovelas produced and aired by TV Globo:

- Guerra dos Sexos (1983 TV series)
- Guerra dos Sexos (2012 TV series)
