= Cleyde Yáconis =

Brazilian actress (1923–2013)

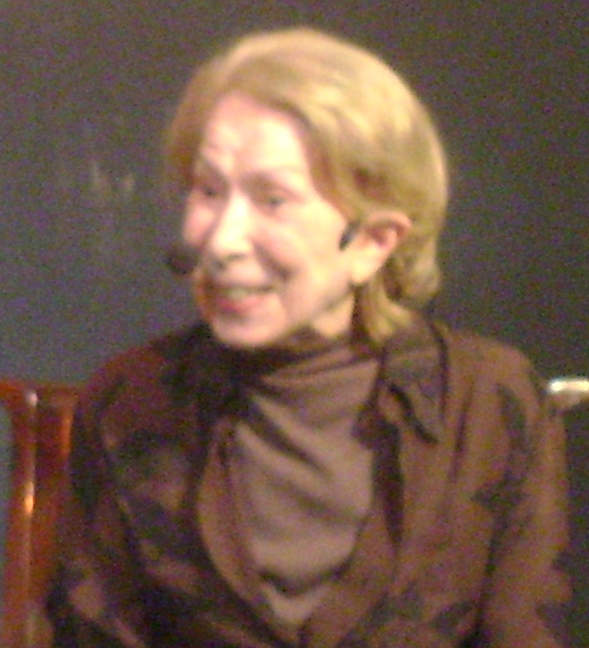
- Yáconis in 2011
- Born: Cleyde Becker Iaconis; 14 November 1923; Pirassununga, São Paulo, Brazil
- Died: 15 April 2013 (aged 89); São Paulo, Brazil
- Occupation: Actress
- Years active: 1950–2012
- Spouse: Stênio Garcia (m. 1958; sep. 1969)
- Relatives: Cacilda Becker (sister)

Cleyde Yáconis (14 November 1923 – 15 April 2013) was a Brazilian actress.

== Life and career ==
She began her career at Brazilian Comedy Theater (TBC) with her sister, Cacilda Becker. She has a repertoire of varied range of theatrical dramaturgy. Cleyde tends to play characters older than her own, perhaps because of her contralto voice and her features.

She actively participated in theater productions and television. In cinema, she had a meager career with few roles over the half-century she acted. Her last TV role was fun Dona Brigida Gouveia, in the Silvio de Abreu's telenovela Passione, aired by Rede Globo. Among her television work, stand out Mulheres de Areia, Os Inocentes, Gaivotas, Ninho da Serpente, Rainha da Sucata, Vamp and Torre de Babel.

Her most striking role was Isabelle de Bresson in Rainha da Sucata, a bankrupt millionaire who behaved as if she were still rich and did not accept the reality in which she lived.

On September 29, 2009, the former Cosipa Culture Theatre was renamed "Cleyde Yáconis Theatre" in honor of the actress who starred in the first play produced in the house - The Road to Mecca.

In July 2010, she withdrew from Passione, having broken her femur. She came back to production on August 12. Due to complications that had the implant prosthesis in her femur, the actress stayed away from the telenovela recordings for at least 15 days.

== Death ==
On April 15, 2013, she died in Sírio-Libanês Hospital where she was hospitalized since March.

== Filmography ==
=== Film ===
- Veneno (1952) - Gina (voice)
- Na Senda do Crime (1954) - Jurema
- A Madona de Cedro (1968) - Lola Boba
- Beto Rockfeller (1970)
- Parada 88 - O Limite de Alerta (1978) - Preacher
- Dora Doralina (1982)
- Jogo Duro (1985)
- Célia & Rosita (2000, Short)
- Bodas de Papel (2008) - Dona Cecília

=== Television ===
- O amor tem cara de mulher (1966, TV Tupi) - Vanessa
- Éramos Seis (1967, TV Tupi) - Dona Lola
- A Muralha (1968, TV Excelsior) - bandeirante (participation)
- Os Diabólicos (1968, TV Excelsior) - Paula
- A menina do veleiro azul (1969, TV Excelsior)
- Vidas em conflito (1969, TV Excelsior) - Ana
- Mais Forte que o Ódio (1970, TV Excelsior) - Clô
- Mulheres de Areia (1973, TV Tupi) - Clarita Assunção
- Os Inocentes (1974, TV Tupi) - Juliana
- Ovelha Negra (1975, TV Tupi) - Laura
- O Julgamento (1976, TV Tupi) - Mercedes
- Um dia, o amor (1976, TV Tupi) - Maria Eunice
- Aritana (1978, TV Tupi) - Elza
- Gaivotas (1979, TV Tupi) - Lídia
- Um homem muito especial (1980, Rede Bandeirantes) - Marta
- Floradas na Serra (1981, TV Cultura) - Dona Matilde
- O fiel e a pedra (1981, TV Cultura)
- O vento do mar aberto (1981, TV Cultura) - Clara
- Campeão (1982, Rede Bandeirantes) - Helena
- Ninho da Serpente (1982, Rede Bandeirantes) - Guilhermina Taques Penteado
- Meus Filhos, Minha Vida (1984, SBT) - Adelaide
- Uma Esperança no Ar (1985, SBT)
- Rainha da Sucata (1990) - Isabelle de Bresson
- Vamp (1991) - D. Virginia
- Olho no Olho (1993) - D. Julieta
- Sex Appeal (1993) - Cecília
- Os Ossos do Barão (1997, SBT) - Melica Parente de Redon Pompeo e Taques
- Torre de Babel (1998) - Diolinda Falcão
- As Filhas da Mãe (2001) - Dona Gorgo Gutierrez
- Um Só Coração (2004) - herself (special participation)
- Cidadão Brasileiro (2006, Rede Record) - Dona Joana Salles Jordão
- Eterna Magia (2007) - Dona Chiquinha (Francisca Finnegan)
- Passione (2010)

== Theater ==
- O Anjo de Pedra by Tennessee Williams (1950)
- Pega-Fogo by Jules Renard (1950)
- Six Characters in Search of an Author by Luigi Pirandello (1951)
- Ralé by Máximo Gorki (1951)
- Right You Are (if you think so) by Luigi Pirandello (1953)
- Leonor de Mendonça by Gonçalves Dias (1954)
- Mary Stuart by Friedrich Schiller (1955)
- Eurydice by Jean Anouilh (1956)
- A Rainha e os Rebeldes by Ugo Betti (1957)
- O Santo e a Porca by Ariano Suassuna (1958)
- O Pagador de Promessas by Dias Gomes (1960)
- A Semente by Gianfrancesco Guarnieri (1961)
- A Escada by Jorge Andrade (1961)
- Death of a Salesman by Arthur Miller (1962)
- Yerma by Federico García Lorca (1962)
- Os Ossos do Barão by Jorge Andrade (1963)
- Vereda da Salvação by Jorge Andrade (1964)
- Toda Nudez Será Castigada by Nelson Rodrigues (1965) (Molière Award as Best actress)
- As Fúrias by Rafael Alberti (1966)
- O Fardão by Bráulio Pedroso (1967)
- Oedipus Rex by Sophocles (1967)
- Medea by Euripides (1970)
- A Capital Federal by Artur Azevedo (producer) (1972)
- The Lover by Harold Pinter (1978)
- A Nonna (1980)
- The Cherry Orchard by Anton Chekhov (1982)
- A Cerimônia do Adeus by Mauro Rasi (1989)
- O Baile de Máscaras by Mauro Rasi (1991) (Molière Award as Best actress)
- As Filhas de Lúcifer by William Luce (1993) (Mambembe Award as Best actress)
- Pericles, Prince of Tyre by William Shakespeare (1995)
- Long Day's Journey into Night by Eugene O'Neill (2002)
- Cinema Eden by Marguerite Duras (2005)
- The Madwoman of Chaillot by Jean Giraudoux (2006)
- The Road to Mecca by Athol Fugard (2008)
- Elas Não Gostam de Apanhar (2012)
