= Edy Lima =

Brazilian writer (1924–2021)

Edy Maria Dutra da Costa Lima, best known as Edy Lima (July 7, 1924 – May 1, 2021), was a Brazilian writer. She wrote more than fifty works, among them the children's book series A Vaca Voadora. Lima also wrote stage plays and screenplays for telenovelas.

== Biography ==
Lima was born in Bagé, Rio Grande do Sul, in 1924. In 1941, at age 17, she moved to Porto Alegre, where she worked as a reporter for the Revista do Globo magazine. Later she moved to São Paulo, where she wrote for newspapers Jornal de São Paulo and Diário de S. Paulo. Lima published her first children's book in 1945, A moedinha amassada; in 1972 she wrote A Vaca Voadora (The Flying Cow), the first of a series of seven books.

She was part of the Teatro de Arena de São Paulo, which staged her play A farsa da esposa perfeita, directed by Augusto Boal; Lima also adapted Carolina Maria de Jesus' book Quarto de Despejo for the stage. On television, she wrote the telenovela Como Salvar Meu Casamento, aired in 1979 on TV Tupi.

Edy Lima died in São Paulo, on May 1, 2021.

== Books ==
1945 - A moedinha amassada
1948 – O macaco e o confeito
1952 – O menor anão do mundo
1952 – Uma aventura pela história do Brasil
1958 – Minuano
1972 – A vaca voadora
1973 – A vaca na selva
1973 – A vaca deslumbrada
1975 – A vaca proibida
1975 – A vaca submarina
1976 – A farsa da esposa perfeita
1976 – A vaca invisível
1977 – A vaca misteriosa
1979 – O poder do superbicho
1980 – Magitrônica
1985 – Brincando com fogo
1985 – Cobertos de terra
1985 – Flutuando no ar
1985 – Melhor que a encomenda
1985 – Mergulho na água
1986 – Como pagar a dívida sem fim
1986 - Lourenço Benites, Pisces in Aquario
1987 – A gente que ia buscar o dia
1987 – Mãe que faz e acontece
1988 – Mãe assim quero pra mim
1990 – O outro lado da galáxia
1992 – Pai sabe tudo e muito mais
1992 – Papai maravilha
1993 – Linha reta e linha curva (vários autores)
1995 – A gente e as outras gentes
1995 – Bicho de todo jeito e feitio
1995 – Presente de amigo e inimigo
1996 – A escola nossa de cada dia
1996 – Pátria adorada entre outras mil
1997 – Índio cantado em prosa e verso
2000 – Ao sol do novo mundo
2000 – Domínio da incerteza
2005 – A quadratura do círculo
2005 – Primeiro amor
2006 – Histórias de futebol (vários autores)
2006 – O caneco dourado
2009 – A sopa de pedra
2009 – Os patinhos lindos e os ovos de ouro
2009 – Bobos e espertos
2011 – A casa assombrada
2011 – Opiniões irreverentes
