= A Moça Que Veio de Longe =

- Genre: Telenovela
- Created by: Ivani Ribeiro
- Based on: Abel Santa Cruz
- Directed by: Dionísio Azevedo
- Country of origin: Brazil
- Original language: Portuguese

Original release
- Network: TV Excelsior
- Release: 1964

A Moça Que Veio de Longe (English: The Girl From Far Away) is a 1964 Brazilian telenovela written by Ivani Ribeiro, based on the novel by Abel Santa Cruz.

== Cast ==
- Rosamaria Murtinho.... Maria Aparecida
- Hélio Souto.... Raul
- Flora Geny.... Teresa
- Lourdes Rocha.... Miriam
- Sílvio Francisco.... Pedro
- Neuza Amaral.... Regina
- Lourdinha Félix.... Lenita
- Maria Aparecida Báxter....
- Renato Master.... Henrique
- Wilma de Aguiar.... Conceição
- Ivan Mesquita.... Nesto
