= Guerra dos Sexos (1983 TV series) =

- Genre: Telenovela; Romantic comedy
- Created by: Silvio de Abreu
- Directed by: Guel Arraes; Jorge Fernando
- Starring: Fernanda Montenegro; Paulo Autran; Glória Menezes; Tarcísio Meira
- Opening theme: "Guerra dos Sexos", The Fevers
- Country of origin: Brazil
- Original language: Portuguese
- No. of episodes: 185

Production
- Running time: 55 minutes

Original release
- Network: TV Globo
- Release: June 6, 1983 – January 6, 1984

Related
- Guerra dos Sexos (2012)

Guerra dos Sexos is a 1983 Brazilian telenovela created by Silvio de Abreu, starring Fernanda Montenegro and Paulo Autran in the main roles.

A remake was produced and aired by TV Globo in 2012, starring Irene Ravache and Tony Ramos.

== Plot ==
Charlô (Fernanda Montenegro) and Otávio (Paulo Autran) are cousins, and they inherit an inheritance of their uncle Enrico, that includes a chain of stores and the mansion where they live. Charlô makes a proposal to Otavio: one of them must give up his part in a bet.

== Cast ==
Actor/actress	Character
Fernanda Montenegro	Charlotte de Alcântara Pereira Barreto (Charlô) / Cumbuca
Fernanda Montenegro	Altamiranda de Souza Silva
Paulo Autran	Otávio de Alcântara Rodrigues e Silva (Bimbo)
Paulo Autran	Dominguinhos de Souza Silva
Glória Menezes	Roberta Leone
Tarcísio Meira	Felipe de Alcântara Pereira Barreto
Lucélia Santos	Carolina Carneiro
Mário Gomes	Orlando Cardoso (Nando)
Maitê Proença	Juliana de Alcântara Pereira Barreto
Maria Zilda	Vânia Trabucco de Morais
José Mayer	Ulisses da Silva
Yara Amaral	Antonieta Carneiro (Nieta)
Herson Capri	Fábio Marino
Ada Chaseliov	Manuela Marino
Ary Fontoura	Dinorá Carneiro (Dino)
Hélio Souto	Nenê Gomalina
Sônia Clara	Veruska Brandão
Edson Celulari	Zenon da Silva
Marilu Bueno	Olívia
Cristina Pereira	Afrodite da Silva (Frô)
Diogo Vilela	Carlos Henrique "Kico" Leone
Helena Ramos	Lucilene
Ângela Figueiredo	Analu de Alcântara Pereira Barreto
Terezinha Sodré	Leda
Paulo César Grande	Ronaldo
Leina Krespi	Semíramis da Silva
Wilson Grey	Ismael
Fernando José	Montanha Duncrezio
Tatiana Issa	Cissa Marino
Beatriz Lyra	Gertrudes
Ilva Niño	Women in the jungle
