= Rosamaria Murtinho =

Brazilian actress (born 1932)

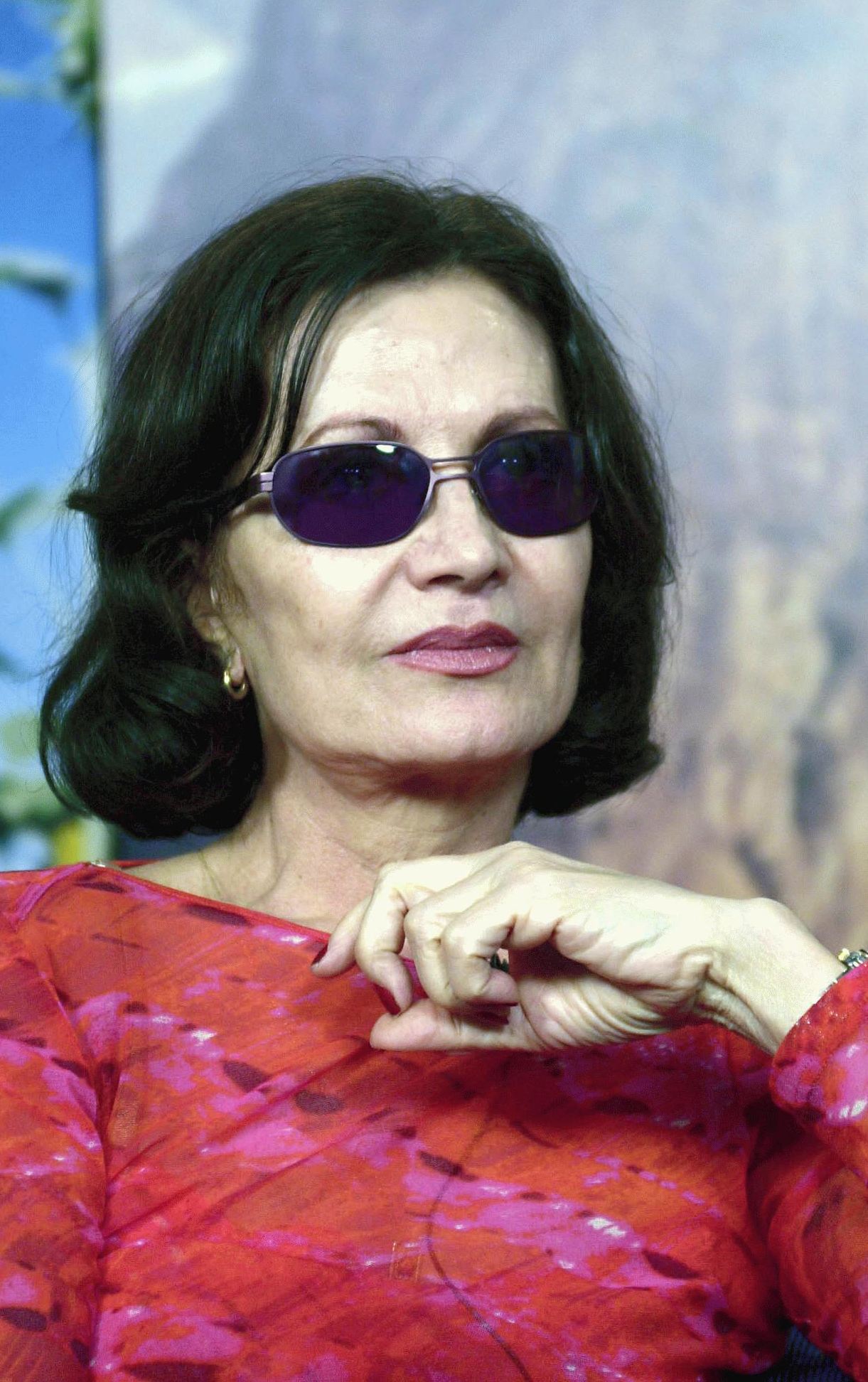
- Rosamaria Murtinho in 2003
- Born: Rosa Maria Pereira Murtinho; October 24, 1932 (age 93); Belém, Pará, Brazil
- Occupation: Actress
- Spouse: Mauro Mendonça (m. 1959)
- Children: 3, including Mauro Mendonça Filho

Rosa Maria "Rosamaria" Pereira Murtinho (born October 24, 1932) is a Brazilian actress.

Born in Belém, she is married to fellow actor Mauro Mendonça.

== Selected filmography ==
- A Moça Que Veio de Longe (1964)
- O Santo Mestiço (1966)
- A Muralha (1968)
- O Primeiro Amor (1972)
- Carinhoso (1973)
- Escalada (1975)
- Cuca Legal (1975)
- Pecado Capital (1975)
- Pai Herói (1979)
- Chega Mais (1980)
- Baila Comigo (1981)
- Sétimo Sentido (1982)
- Vereda Tropical (1984)
- Mandala (1987)
- Kananga do Japão (1989)
- Pantanal (1990)
- Você Decide (1994)
- A Próxima Vítima (1995)
- Salsa e Merengue (1996)
- Corpo Dourado (1998)
- Chiquinha Gonzaga (1999)
- Vila Madalena (1999)
- As Filhas da Mãe (2001)
- Estrela-Guia (2001)
- Chocolate com Pimenta (2003)
- Malhação (2004)
- A Diarista (2004)
- Paraíso Tropical (2007)
- Sete Pecados (2007)
- Toma Lá, Dá Cá (2008)
- O Astro (2011)
- Guerra dos Sexos (2012)
- Amor à Vida (2013)
- Deus Salve o Rei (2018)
- A Dona do Pedaço (2019)
- Dona de Mim (2025)
