= S. Bernardo (film) =

1972 film directed by Leon Hirszman

São Bernardo
- Film poster
- Directed by: Leon Hirszman
- Screenplay by: Leon Hirszman
- Based on: São Bernardo by Graciliano Ramos
- Produced by: Henrique Coutinho; Marcos Farias; Luna Moskovitch; Márcio Noronha
- Starring: Othon Bastos
- Cinematography: Lauro Escorel
- Edited by: Eduardo Escorel
- Music by: Caetano Veloso
- Distributed by: Embrafilme
- Release date: 1972
- Country: Brazil
- Language: Portuguese

São Bernardo is a 1972 Brazilian film written and directed by Leon Hirszman, based on the novel São Bernardo by Graciliano Ramos. It stars Othon Bastos as Paulo Honório, a farmer and landowner in Brazil tortured by his personal desires and ambitions.

== Release ==
The film was released by Embrafilme in 1972 in Brazil. It was screened in 2012 by the Museum of Modern Art, in New York City.

== Reception ==
The film was called "a true masterpiece" by Brazilian film magazine Contracampo.

== Awards ==
The film won Best Actor for Bastos at the Gramado Film Festival.
