= 38th Venice International Film Festival =

Italian film festival in 1981

- Festival poster
- Location: Venice, Italy
- Founded: 1932
- Awards: Golden Lion: Marianne and Juliane
- Festival date: 2 – 12 September 1981
- Website: Website

Venice Film Festival chronology
- 39th 37th

The 38th annual Venice International Film Festival was held on 2 to 12 September, 1981.

Italian writer and journalist Italo Calvino was the Jury President of the main competition. The Golden Lion winner was Marianne and Juliane directed by Margarethe von Trotta.

== Jury ==
The following people comprised the 1981 jury:

- Italo Calvino, Italian writer and journalist - Jury President
- Marie-Christine Barrault, French actress
- Peter Bogdanovich, American filmmaker
- Luigi Comencini, Italian filmmaker
- Manoel de Oliveira, Portuguese filmmaker
- Mohammed Lakhdar-Hamina, Algerian filmmaker
- Jesús Fernández Santos, Spanish filmmaker
- Sergei Solovyov, Soviet filmmaker
- Krzysztof Zanussi, Polish filmmaker and producer

== Official Sections ==
The following films were selected to be screened:

=== Main Competition ===
English title	Original title	Director(s)	Production country
Beirut the Encounter	Beyroutou el lika	Borhane Alaouié	Lebanon
Cutting It Short	Postrizinj	Jiří Menzel	Czechoslovakia
Do You Remember Dolly Bell?	Сјећаш ли се Доли Бел?	Emir Kusturica	Yugoslavia
The Fall of Italy	Pad Italije	Lordan Zafranović	Yugoslavia
The Fall of the Rebel Angels	La caduta degli angeli ribelli	Marco Tullio Giordana	Italy
Forest of Love	Bosco d'amore	Alberto Bevilacqua	Italy
The Games of Countess Dolingen	Les Jeux de la Comtesse Dolingen de Gratz	Catherine Binet	France
The Kaleidoscope	Chaalchitra	Mrinal Sen	India
Kargus		Juan Minon, Miguel Ángel Trujillo	Spain
Marianne and Juliane	Die bleierne Zeit	Margarethe von Trotta	West Germany
The Opportunities of Rosa	Le occasioni di Rosa	Salvatore Piscicelli	Italy
Prince of the City		Sidney Lumet	United States
Silvestre		João César Monteiro	Portugal
Starfall	Звездопад	Igor Talankin	Soviet Union
Sweet Dreams	Sogni d'oro	Nanni Moretti	Italy
Sweet Pea	Piso pisello	Peter Del Monte	Italy
They Don't Wear Black Tie	Eles Não Usam Black-Tie	Leon Hirszman	Brazil
True Confessions		Ulu Grosbard	United States
The Tyrant's Heart	A Zsarnok Szive	Miklós Jancsó	Hungary
The Witch Hunt	Forfølgelsen	Anja Brejen	Norway

=== Out of Competition ===
English title	Original title	Director(s)	Production country
From a Far Country		Krzysztof Zanussi	Italy, United Kingdom, Poland
Maeve		Pat Murphy	United Kingdom, Ireland
Reborn	Renacer	Bigas Luna	Spain
The Savage Land	Yuan Ye	Zi Ling	China
Tales of Ordinary Madness	Storie di ordinaria follia	Marco Ferreri	Italy

=== Mezzogiorno-Mezzanotte ===
English title	Original title	Director(s)	Production country
Blow Out		Brian De Palma	United States
Christiane F.	Christiane F. – Wir Kinder vom Bahnhof Zoo	Uli Edel	West Germany
Cutter's Way		Ivan Passer	United States
Don't Cry		Paolo Brunatto, Costanzo Allione	Italy
The Falcon	Banovic Strahinja	Vatroslav Mimica	Yugoslavia, Germany
Francisca		Manoel de Oliveira	Portugal
The Hut	Pimak	Lee Doo-yong	South Korea
Leave Her to Heaven (1945)		John M. Stahl	United States
One Man's War	La guerre d'un seul homme	Edgardo Cozarinsky	France
Pickup on South Street (1953)		Samuel Fuller	United States
Raiders of the Lost Ark		Steven Spielberg	United States
Rencontre des nuages et du dragon		Lâm Lê	Vietnam, France
San Clemente		Raymond Depardon, Sophie Ristelhueber	France
S.O.B.		Blake Edwards	United States
A Velha a Fiar (1960)		Humberto Mauro	Brazil
Tribute to Yuriy Norshteyn
Hedgehog in the Fog (1975)	Yozhik v tumane	Yuri Norstein	Soviet Union
Tale of Tales (1979)	Skazka skazok	Yuri Norstein	Soviet Union

=== Officina Veneziana ===
English title	Original title	Director(s)	Production country
Le corderie dell'immaginario		Reniero Compostella, Ettore Pasculli	Italy
Fermata Etna		Klaus Michael Grüber	Italy, France, Canada, Switzerland
The Half-Meter Incident	Hadisat an-nusf meter	Samir Zikra	Syria
Du Zaïre au Congo		Hubert Galle, Christian Mesnil	Belgium, Switzerland, Canada
La Ferdinanda: Sonate für eine Medici-Villa		Rebecca Horn	West Germany
The Homeless One	Matlosa	Villi Hermann	Switzerland
Let There Be Light (1946)		John Huston	United States
My Mother, My Daughter		Nadia Werba	Italy
Pablo Picasso Painter	Le cantique des créature: Pablo Picasso pintor	Frédéric Rossif	France, Spain
Plunder of Peach and Plum (1934)	桃李劫	Yunwei Ying	China
Sirenen-Eiland		Isa Hesse-Rabinovitch	West Germany, Switzerland
Der subjektive Faktor		Helke Sander	West Germany

== Official Awards ==
The following awards were presented at the 38th edition:

=== In Competition ===
- Golden Lion: Marianne and Juliane by Margarethe von Trotta
- Special Jury Prize:
  - Sweet Dreams by Nanni Moretti
  - They Don't Wear Black-tie by Leon Hirszman
- Silver Lion: Do You Remember Dolly Bell? by Emir Kusturica
- Best Actress (assigned, but not Volpi Cup): Barbara Sukowa & Jutta Lampe for Marianne and Juliane

== Independent Awards ==
=== FIPRESCI Prize ===
- Marianne and Juliane by Margarethe von Trotta
- They Don't Wear Black-tie by Leon Hirszman
- Do You Remember Dolly Bell? by Emir Kusturica
