= Mauro Mendonça Filho =

Brazilian television director

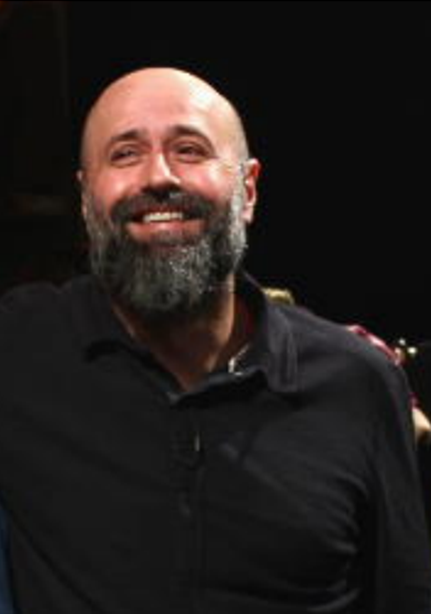
Mauro Mendonça Filho

Mauro Mendonça Filho (born August 8, 1965 in Rio de Janeiro) is a Brazilian television director. He is the son of actors Rosamaria Murtinho and Mauro Mendonça.

== Bibliography ==
- Sérgio, Renato. Mauro Mendonça: em busca da perfeição (2009).
