= Teatro Brasileiro de Comédia =

Theater in São Paulo, Brazil

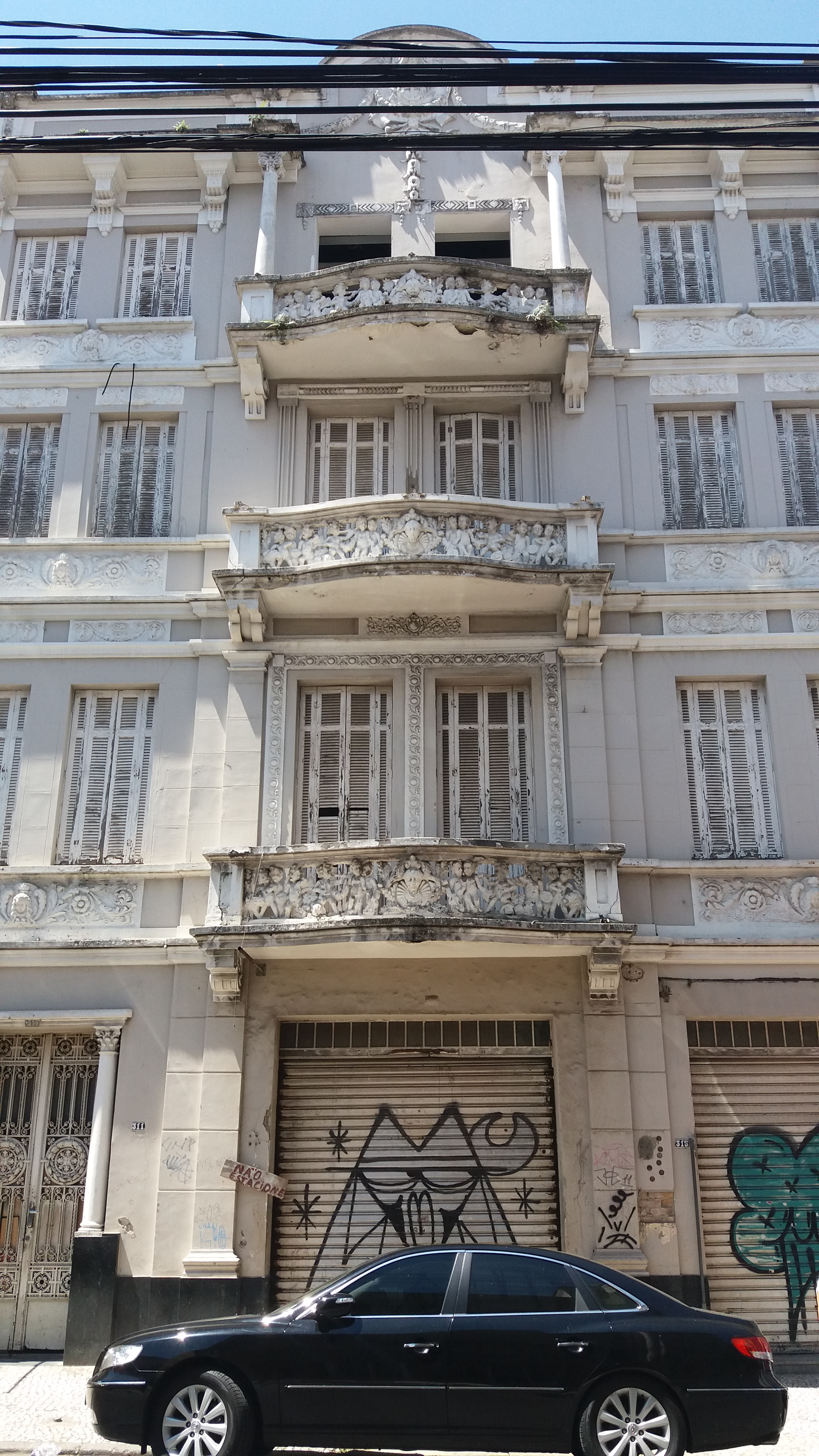
- Facade of the theater in 2016

- Location within São Paulo Location within Brazil

General information
- Type: Theater
- Location: São Paulo, São Paulo, Brazil
- Coordinates: 23°33′12.35″S 46°38′35.19″W
- Opened: 1948

The Teatro Brasileiro de Comédia (English: Brazilian Comedy Theater - TBC) is located in the Bela Vista neighborhood, in the central zone of the Brazilian city of São Paulo. It was founded in 1948 by businessman Franco Zampari, with the financial support of part of São Paulo's elite.

Between 1948 and 1964, the TBC housed a homonymous theater company, which was created to provide a space for amateur theater in the city of São Paulo. After the company's activities ceased, the venue offered theatrical performances until 2008, when it closed permanently. Among the artists who have performed at the theater are Cacilda Becker, Paulo Autran, Cleyde Yáconis and Fernanda Montenegro.

It was declared a landmark in 1982 by the Council for the Defense of Historical, Archaeological, Artistic and Tourist Heritage (Portuguese: Conselho de Defesa do Patrimônio Histórico, Arqueológico, Artístico e Turístico - Condephaat) and in 1991 by the Municipal Council for the Preservation of the Historical, Cultural and Environmental Heritage of the City of São Paulo (Conselho Municipal de Preservação do Patrimônio Histórico, Cultural e Ambiental da Cidade de São Paulo - Conpresp). In 2018, it was acquired by the Social Service of Commerce (Serviço Social do Comércio - SESC) to serve as a unit for the organization.

== History ==
=== Foundation ===
The Teatro Brasileiro de Comédia (TBC) was founded in 1948 by Franco Zampari, an Italian engineer from Indústrias Matarazzo, with financial support from the São Paulo bourgeoisie. In 1945, Zampari, who had two positions at the Municipal Theater of São Paulo, began to engage in theatrical activity after writing, producing and presenting the play A Mulher de Braços Alçados in the backyard of his home.

A few years later, he and his colleagues rented an old building on Major Diogo Street and remodeled it to accommodate a theater. After the renovation, the venue acquired 365 seats, a warehouse for stage props, storage for used sets and stage furniture, carpentry and joinery, an administration room, a reading room, two rehearsal rooms and 18 dressing rooms. The theater opened on October 11, 1948, with two performances: The Human Voice, by Jean Cocteau, and A mulher do próximo, by Abílio Pereira de Almeida. It also featured Cacilda Becker, the first actress to become a professional in Brazilian theater.

=== The company ===
In 1949, Franco Zampari decided that the company, which had begun as an amateur troupe, needed to be professionalized to generate funds and maintain its operations. He hired a group of foreign directors, including the Italian Adolfo Celi, who became the TBC's first artistic director. He directed the group's first professional production, The Time of Your Life, written by American playwright William Saroyan. The Teatro Brasileiro de Comédia gained members who would become important actors in Brazilian theater, such as Sérgio Cardoso, Paulo Autran, Tônia Carrero, Cleyde Yáconis, Cacilda Becker, Walmor Chagas, Nydia Licia, Fernanda Montenegro and Fernando Torres.

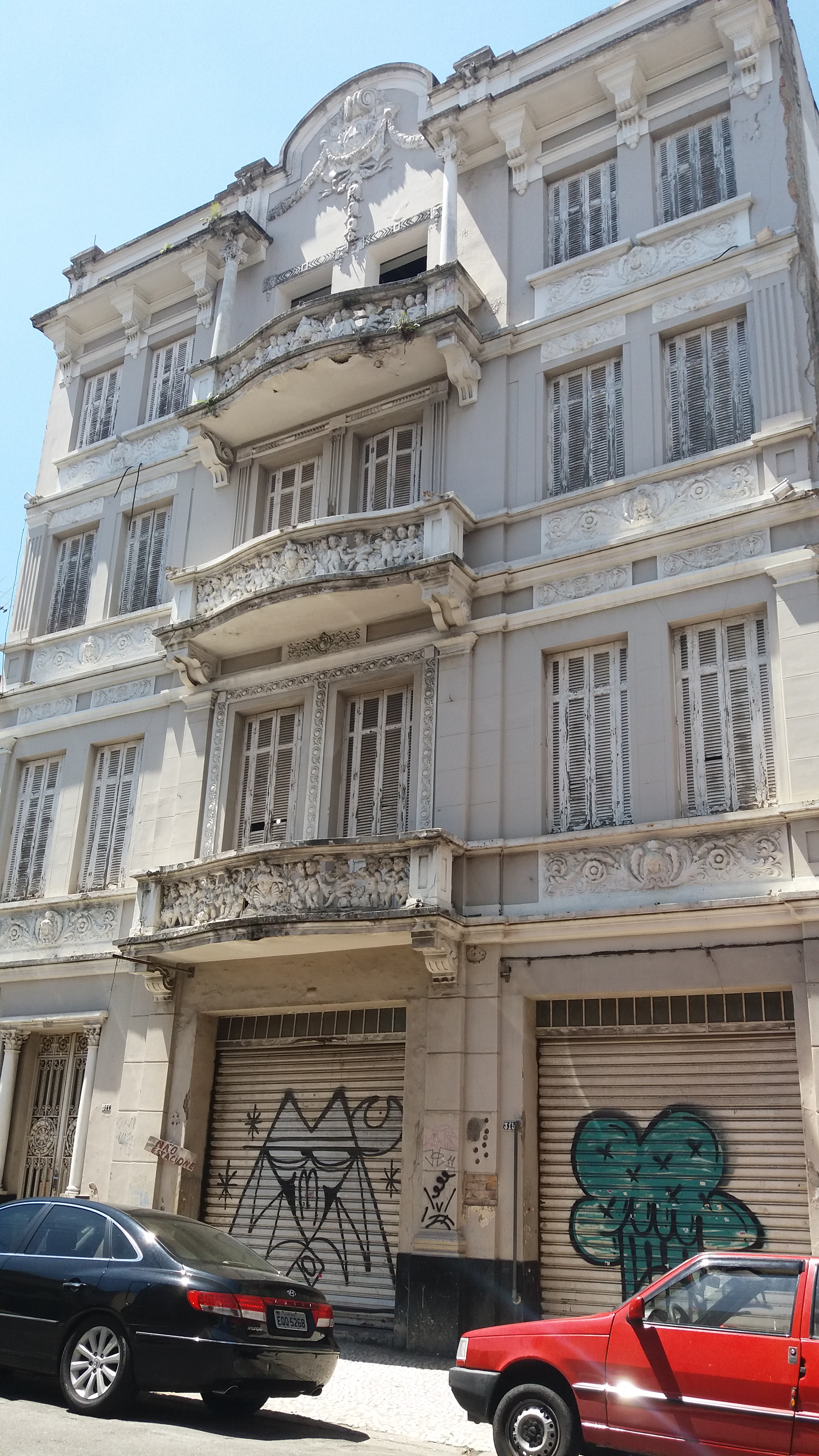
The structure of the TBC comprises four floors and a basement.

In 1956, the company fell into crisis due to very expensive productions with low financial returns and the departure of a considerable number of the main members to establish their own companies, including artistic director Adolfo Celi, who partnered with Paulo Autran and Tônia Carrero. Maurice Vaneau, a Belgian director who visited the TBC during a trip by the Belgian National Theatre to Brazil in 1955, succeeded Celi. In the following years, the organization achieved considerable successes, such as the productions of The Teahouse of the August Moon, by John Patrick, and Cat on a Hot Tin Roof, by Tennessee Williams. In 1957, under the new direction of Alberto D'Aversa, it presented the text Rua São Luís, 27 - 8º andar, by Abílio Pereira de Almeida.

In 1958, the Teatro Brasileiro de Comédia was awarded the Saci Award (Prêmio Saci) and the São Paulo Association of Art Critics (Associação Paulista de Críticos de Arte - APCT) prize for ten years of activity. Franco Zampari received the title of Citizen of São Paulo and the Golden Cup from the Union of Professional Journalists of the State of São Paulo (Sindicato de Jornalistas Profissionais do Estado de São Paulo). In 1959, the Teatro dos Sete was formed by Fernanda Montenegro, Sergio Britto (both former TBC members), Gianni Ratto and Ítalo Rossi. In 1960, Zampari transferred the direction of the TBC to a legal company called Sociedade Brasileira de Comédia and the artistic direction to Flávio Rangel. The change marked the beginning of the "nationalist phase" of the Teatro Brasileiro de Comédia, whose first production was the play O Pagador de Promessas, written by playwright Dias Gomes.

In 1962, the company's artistic direction was resumed by Maurice Vaneau. In an effort to extend the repertoire to include all social classes, he invited popular authors, such as Jorge Andrade, Manuel Bandeira, Carlos Drummond de Andrade and José Lins do Rego, to write plays for the company; Vereda Salvação, the last play staged by the company, was written by Jorge Andrade. Unable to overcome the constant financial crises, the company ceased operating in 1964. Under the direction of the Sociedade Brasileira de Comédia, the TBC remained an autonomous theater, hosting several productions and performances until its closure in 2008.

=== School of Dramatic Art (EAD) ===
The School of Dramatic Art of the University of São Paulo (Escola de Arte Dramática da Universidade de São Paulo), popularly known as EAD, is one of the main theater schools in Latin America. It was founded in 1948 on the top floor of the TBC under the leadership of Alfredo Mesquita and included professors such as Cacilda Becker.

== Architectural features ==
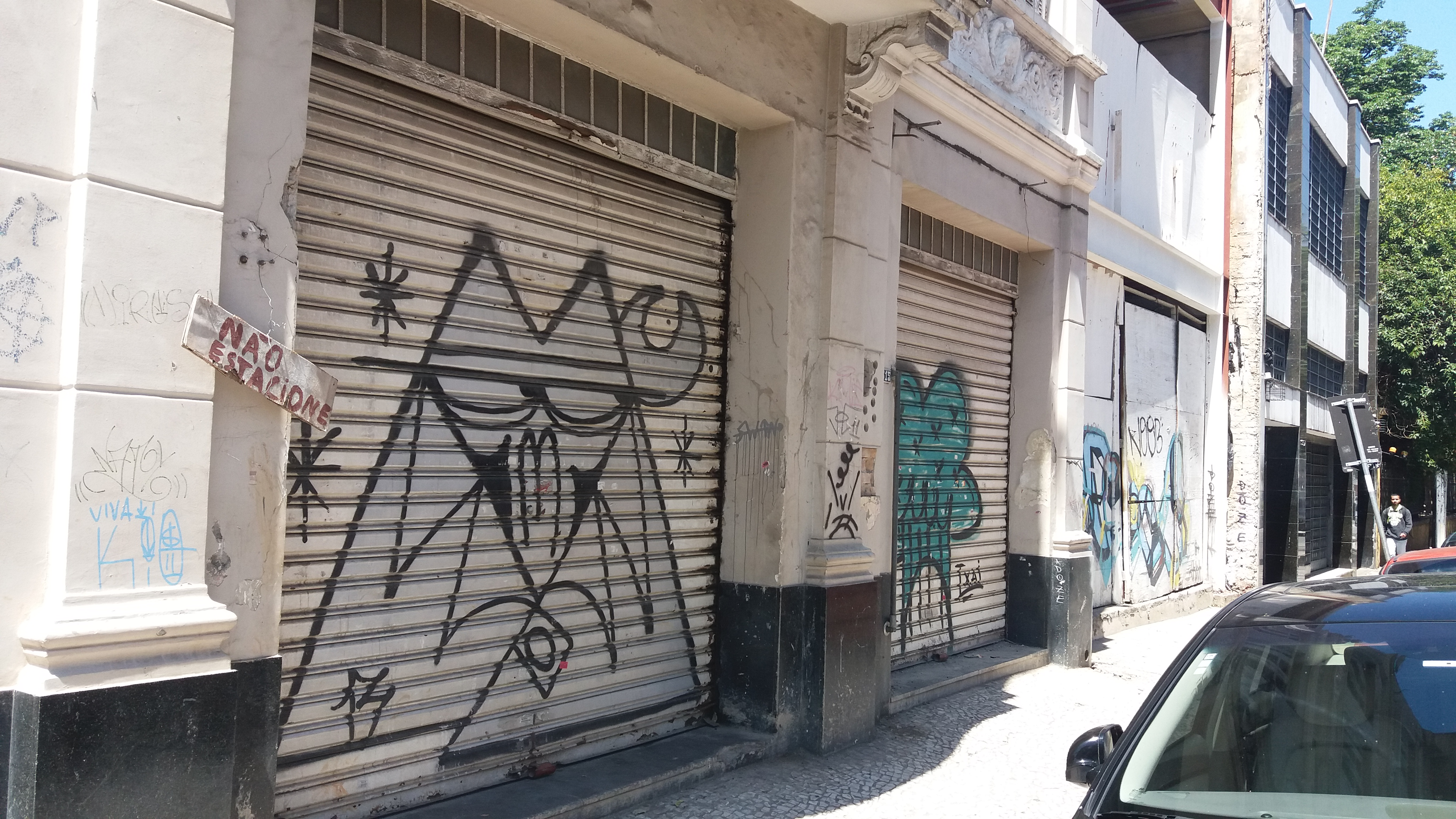
The exterior of the TBC faced graffiti in recent years.

The building has four floors and a basement. The ground and upper floors housed the main stage, the carpentry shop, the rehearsal hall, the upper and lower audience and toilets for the public; the first floor consisted mostly of an uncovered area.

On the second floor there was another stage with an arch projection, the lighting and ventilation shaft and other toilets. The third floor was smaller and had no public access; the basement housed the building's third stage with audience, the hall, a second rehearsal room, the lighting control system, the storeroom, another toilet and the underground water tank. The building also contained a workshop, studio space, closet and carpentry.

== Historical and cultural significance ==
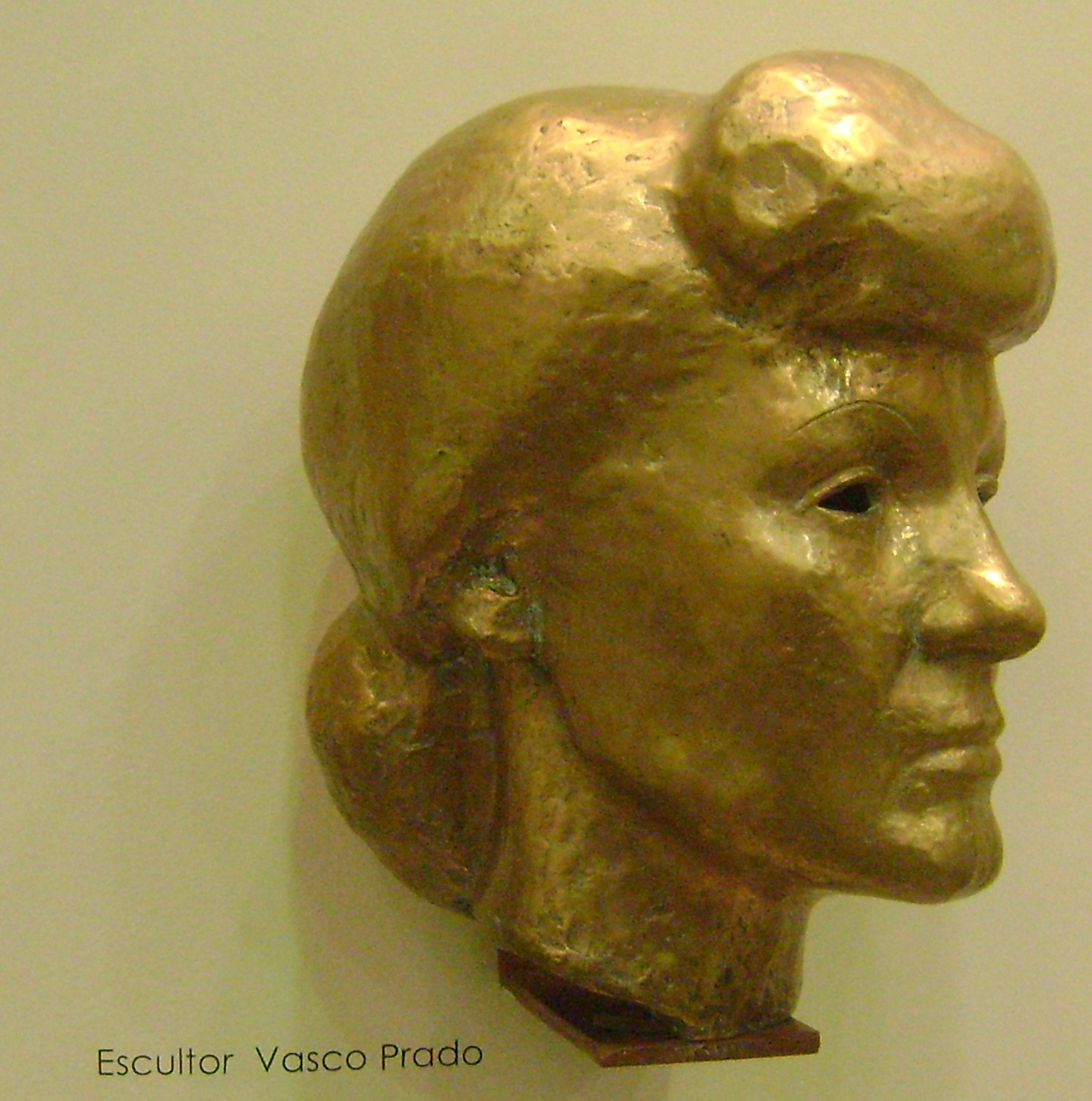
Bust of Cacilda Becker located at the entrance to the Cacilda Becker Theater.

The company innovated by not focusing on individual actors or actresses and by recruiting internationally renowned artists to direct the show during a period of professionalization in Brazilian theater.

The experience brought by these professionals, combined with an aesthetic rigor and techniques that had never been practiced in Brazil before, played an essential role in the development of theatrical activity in the country. The TBC served as the basis for several initiatives in Brazil, such as the Teatro Oficina, the Teatro de Arena and the companies of Cacilda Becker; Tônia Carrero, Adolfo Celi and Paulo Autran; and Nydia Lícia and Paulo Autran.

Besides the professionalization and the structure of the theater, the company innovated by combining entertainment and culture, worrying about income and box office, and training actors to focus on the show and submit to the director's scenic direction.

== Current status ==
At the end of 2008, the National Arts Foundation (Fundação Nacional de Artes - Funarte) decided to expropriate the building for renovation. At the time, the project was expected to cost between R$1.5 million and R$2 million. Sérgio Mamberti, then president of Funarte, stated to the Folha de S. Paulo newspaper that structural work would begin in 2010. It was also reported that the institution had executed de-ratification and decupinization projects. The article revealed that there were puddles of water, a lack of electricity, lighting, rubble and expired fire extinguishers inside the theater.

At the time, Funarte was subject to a lawsuit filed by businesswoman Magnólia do Lago, owner of the property between 1982 and 2008, who claimed to have rights to the "Teatro Brasileiro de Comédia" and "TBC" brands and demanded almost R$7 million in compensation from the organization. In February 2013, Funarte promised to reopen the theater in October of that year and announced a new investment of R$13 million in renovating the structure. In 2017, the Ministry of Culture announced that the theater would be granted to the private sector by the end of the year.

=== Revitalization by SESC ===
In 2022, the building was acquired by SESC under a 35-year special assignment contract. The plan involved establishing a SESC unit on the site with a wide range of services and programs offered by the institution throughout the state. SESC committed to presenting an architectural project in two years and to completing the work required to operate the space in another six years.

== See also ==
- Companhia Cinematográfica Vera Cruz
