= Ada Chaseliov =

Brazilian actress

- Born: March 30, 1952; Rio de Janeiro, Brazil
- Died: October 27, 2015 (aged 63); São Paulo, Brazil
- Years active: 1973–2014
- Spouse: Ney Sant'Anna (divorced)
- Children: 1

Ada Chaseliov (March 30, 1952 – October 27, 2015) was a Brazilian film, stage, and television actress.

== Life ==
Chaseliov was born in Rio de Janeiro in 1952. She studied at drama school before her film debut in 1973 in Um Virgem na Praça. In 1974, she made her first appearance on TV in the telenovela Supermanoela.

The actress participated in several soap operas on Rede Globo, including the Brazilian telenovela Guerra dos Sexos in 1983, where she played the jealous and tormented Manoela, and the telenovela Belíssima. Both these series were created by Sílvio de Abreu. Her greatest achievement on TV is said to be playing the villain Leonor in the miniseries A Muralha, which was broadcast on the free-to-air Brazilian network Rede Globo in 2000.

Chaseliov appeared on Brazilian television as a judge in the soap opera Amor à Vida in 2013. It was her last appearance in a telenovela. She died in São Paulo in 2015 from cancer. She had a daughter, Mila Chaseliov, with film director Ney Sant'Anna.

== Filmography ==
Year	Title	Role	Notes
1973	Um Virgem na Praça		
1974	Fogo sobre Terra	Maria Paula	
1983	Guerra dos Sexos	Manoela Marino	
1984	Memoirs of Prison		
1988	Sonhei com Você		
1991	Felicidade	Ana	
1993	O Mapa da Mina	Olga	
1994	A Viagem	Fonoaudióloga	
1997-1998	Anjo Mau	Dora	TV series
1999	Suave Veneno		
2000	A Muralha	Leonor	
2002	Desejos de Mulher	Luiza	
2002	Sabor da Paixão	Yvonne Ferreira Jardim	
2004	Da Cor do Pecado	Solange	
2005	Belíssima	Esther Schneider	
2006	Brasília 18%	Cacilda Becker	
2007	Paraíso Tropical	Guiomar	
2007	Sete Pecados		
2010	Passione	Matilde	
2010	De Pernas pro Ar	Dona Lourdes	
2014	As Canalhas	Maria do Carmo	
