= A Muralha (1968 TV series) =

- Also known as: La Muralla
- Genre: Telenovela
- Created by: Ivani Ribeiro
- Starring: Mauro Mendonça; Fernanda Montenegro; Rosamaria Murtinho; Edgard Franco; Arlete Montenegro
- Country of origin: Brazil
- Original language: Portuguese

Original release
- Network: TV Excelsior
- Release: July 1968 – March 1969

A Muralha is a Brazilian telenovela that first aired on TV Excelsior in 1968. It is based on the 1954 novel by Diná Silveira de Queirós.

== Plot ==
Through the family of Dom Braz (Mauro Mendonça), to narrate the events that led to Emboabas War, by extension, the shock of São Paulo who conquered lands and mines and foreigner of different backgrounds, who wanted to get hold of them. The "wall" means the coastal mountain-chain as an obstacle to the incursions of the pioneers in their search for new lands and riches.

In Lagoa Serena surrounded by "wall" and discovered by the pioneers, live Dom Braz, leader of a "bandeira" (explorer caravan organized to make incursions to unknown inland to discover gold and hunt Indians for slavery ), his wife, Mother Candida (Fernanda Montenegro) and their children: Basiléia (Nathália Timberg), Tiago (Edgard Franco), Rosália (Maria Isabel de Lizandra) and Leonel (Gianfrancesco Guarnieri) who lives with his wife, Margarida (Nicette Bruno). Still live there one niece, Isabel (Rosamaria Murtinho), and a mixed-blood Indian, Aimbé (Stênio Gracia).

Around these characters flowing across the plot, which began with the arrival of a Portuguese niece of Dom Braz, Cristina (Arlete Montenegro), who fall in love with Tiago, though latent differences in culture and mentality. But the young Portuguese will have to dispute his love with Isabel, the right arm of Dom Braz that accompanied him on their "bandeiras", a girl that was created between the white people and the family of Indians casting, so a shy personality and wild. But the larger conflict will be generated by Rosalia, to fall by the leader of emboabas, the adventurer and traitor Bento Coutinho (Paulo Goulart).

== Cast ==
- Fernanda Montenegro - Mãe Cândida Olinto
- Mauro Mendonça - Dom Braz Olinto
- Arlete Montenegro - Cristina de Godói
- Edgard Franco - Tiago Olinto
- Rosamaria Murtinho - Isabel Olinto
- Stênio Garcia - Aimbé
- Nicette Bruno - Margarida Olinto
- Gianfrancesco Guarnieri - Leonel Olinto
- Nathália Timberg - Basiléia Olinto
- Cleyde Yáconis - Bandeirante
- Paulo Goulart - Bento Coutinho
- Cláudio Corrêa e Castro - Manuel Nunes Viana

== See also ==
- A Muralha (2000 TV series)
