= Jorge Andrade (playwright) =

Brazilian playwright

Aluísio Jorge Andrade Franco (May 21, 1922 – March 13, 1984), also known as Jorge Andrade or Jorge de Andrade, was a Brazilian playwright, screenwriter, and journalist. Considered a major figure in 20th-century Brazilian theater and television, his plays cover centuries of the country's history, focusing on the rural coffee elites of São Paulo and their decline.

His most well-known plays are A Moratória, which narrates the crisis of a formerly wealthy family deprived of its possessions; Os Ossos do Barão, depicting the rise of a new immigrant class that overtakes the old aristocracy; and Vereda da Salvação, set in a miserable sertão environment, which follows a group of peasants led by a messianic figure.

== Biography ==
Born in Barretos, Andrade grew up on his father's and grandfather's farms, in the interior of São Paulo. After completing his secondary education, he moved to São Paulo to enroll at the city's Faculty of Law, which he later abandoned to work in his family's business. After a dispute with his father, the young Andrade decided to move back to São Paulo, where he drifted for a time, before watching the play Anjo de Pedra, featuring Cacilda Becker, whom he later met and who encouraged him to study theater and write plays.

Andrade wrote his first dramatic work, O Telescópio, at the age of 28. He received the literary prize Fábio Prado de Teatro for the play. He enrolled at the University of São Paulo School of Dramatic Arts and soon debuted on the stage with the play A Moratória, with Fernanda Montenegro, which earned him the Prêmio Saci. His second published play, Pedreira das Almas, earned him the Prêmio APCT, awarded by the São Paulo Art Critics Association.

== Works ==
=== Plays ===
- A Moratória (1955)
- Pedreira das Almas (1958)
- O Telescópio (1960)
- A Escada (1964)
- Vereda de Salvação (1965)
- Rasto Atrás (1967)
- Senhora na Boca do Lixo (1968)
- O Mundo Composto (1972)
- Milagre na Ceia (1978)
- O Incêndio (1979)

=== Anthology ===
- Marta, a Árvore e o Relógio (1970)

== Filmography ==
=== Telenovelas ===
- 1973 - Os Ossos do Barão (TV Globo)
- 1975 - O Grito (TV Globo)
- 1979 - Gaivotas (TV Tupi)
- 1980 - Dulcinéa Vai à Guerra (TV Bandeirantes)
- 1981 - Os Adolescentes (TV Bandeirantes)
- 1982 - Ninho da Serpente (TV Bandeirantes)
- 1983 - Sabor de Mel (TV Bandeirantes)

=== Films ===
- 1965 - Vereda de Salvação (directed and produced by Anselmo Duarte)
- 1983 - A Freira e a Tortura (directed by Ozualdo Candeias)

=== Others ===
- 1974 - Exercício Findo (TV Globo)
- 1982 - A Senhora na Boca do Lixo (TV Cultura)
- 1983 - Mulher Diaba (TV Bandeirantes)
