= Gianfrancesco Guarnieri =

Italian–Brazilian actor, lyricist, poet, and playwright

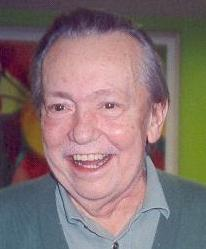
- Gianfrancesco Guarnieri in 2004
- Born: August 6, 1934; Milan, Italy
- Died: July 22, 2006 (aged 71); São Paulo, Brazil
- Citizenship: Italian-Brazilian
- Spouses: Cecilia Thompson (1958–1965); Vanya Sant'Anna (1965–2006)

Gianfrancesco Sigfrido Benedetto Marinenghi de Guarnieri (August 6, 1934 – July 22, 2006) was an Italian–Brazilian actor, lyricist, poet and playwright. He was a key participant in the Arena Theater of São Paulo, his most important work was "They Don't Wear Black Tie".

== Biography ==
He was born in Milan, 6 August 1934, to antifascist musicians. His parents, the maestro Edoardo Guarnieri and the Harpist Elsa Martineghi, decided to move to Brazil in 1936, finding a new home in Rio de Janeiro. In the early 1950s they moved to São Paulo.

A student leader since his teenage years, Guarnieri began to do amateur theater with Oduvaldo Vianna Filho (Vianinha) and a group of students from São Paulo. In 1955 they created the "Paulista Student Theater" (Teatro Paulista do Estudante), with guidance from Ruggero Jacobbi. In the following year that theater group joined with The Arena Theater, founded and directed by José Renato

== Career ==
=== Theater ===
His first play was "They Don't Wear Black Tie" (Eles não usam black tie), first performed in 1958 in the Arena Theater Directed by José Renato, the cast had several young talents who had begun to attract attention, such as Guarnieri himself, Leila Abramo, Miriam Melhler, Flavio Migliaccio, Eugênio Kusnet, Francisco de Assis, Henrique César, Celeste Lima, Riva Nimtz, and Milton Gonçalves;

It was supposed to end the group project, since they were having financial problems, but it had immense success. The play, author and cast were given awards by the governor of São Paulo State, Jânio Quadros, and the Arena was saved from its financial trouble. Around the same time Guarnieri also starred in "O Grande Momento" by Director Roberto Santos, the beginning of the style of film in Brazil called the New Cinema "Cinema Novo".

The director Sandro Polloni asked for a play to be performed by his wife, Maria Della Costa, and her theater company. Guarnieri left Arena for a while to work on that project.

In 1959 Gimba debuted, his first work in italian theater, directed by Flávio Rangel. It was a pioneer in showcasing the reality of the Rio de Janeiro shantytowns (favelas), in the form of a musical, inspired by real life. The play toured through Europe, and performed in the Festival of Nations, in France.

In 1961 the play A Semente (The Seed) premiered, directed also by Flávio Rangel. The openly political play, outside the usual repertoire of the Teatro Brasileiro de Comédia (English: Brazilian Comedy Theater - TBC), showed communist militancy, criticizing both right-wing and left-wing politics. The play had trouble with censors, which dampened the spirits of the then "Burguois Temple of Paulista Theater", which made the play quickly leave circulation. In the same year Guarnieri also participated of two other Flávio Rangel plays: Almas Mortas (Dead Souls) of Gogol, and the first showing of A Escada (The ladder) by Jorge Andrade.

=== Television and Cinema ===
Around 1950 he began to participate also in television and cinema. He became one of Brazil's best and most popular actors.

=== Politics ===
He was Culture Secretary for the municipal government of São Paulo between 1984 and 1986, during the mayorship of Mario Covas.

He was a Communist and open about it.

== Filmography ==
Year	Title	Role	Notes
1958	O Grande Momento		
1965	The Hour and Turn of Augusto Matraga		Writer
1968	A Muralha	Leonel Olinto	TV Series
1973-1974	Mulheres de Areia	Tonho da Lua	TV Series
1977	O Jogo da Vida	Perus	
1978	As Três Mortes de Solano		
1978	Diário da Província		
1978	Curumim		
1980	Gaijin: Roads to Freedom	Enrico	
1980	Asa Branca: Um Sonho Brasileiro	Toninho	
1981	They Don't Wear Black Tie	Otávio	Writer
1983	A Próxima Vítima	Guido Andreolli	
1986	Por Incrível Que Pareça		
1989	Que Rei Sou Eu?	King Petrus II	TV Series
1980	Beijo 2348/72	Photographer	
1990	Rainha da Sucata	Irineu Saldanha	TV Series
1991	Mundo da Lua	Vô Orlando	TV Series
1994	O Quatrilho	Padre Giobbe	
1995	A Próxima Vítima	Eliseu Giardini	TV Series
1999	Contos de Lygia		
2002-2003	Esperança	Pellegrini	TV Series
2005-2006	Belíssima	Peppe	TV Series, (final appearance)
