= Leon Hirszman =

Brazilian documentary filmmaker

- Born: 22 November 1937; Rio de Janeiro, Brazil
- Died: 15 September 1987 (aged 49); Rio de Janeiro, Brazil
- Occupations: Film director, producer and screenwriter
- Notable work: They Don't Wear Black-tie

Leon Hirszman (22 November 1937 – 15 September 1987) was a Brazilian filmmaker, producer and screenwriter, and one of the main figures of Cinema Novo.

A member of the Brazilian Communist Party (PCB), his work was marked by the influence of Marxist ideas, representation of the working class, and the political turmoil of Latin America during the military dictatorship in Brazil.

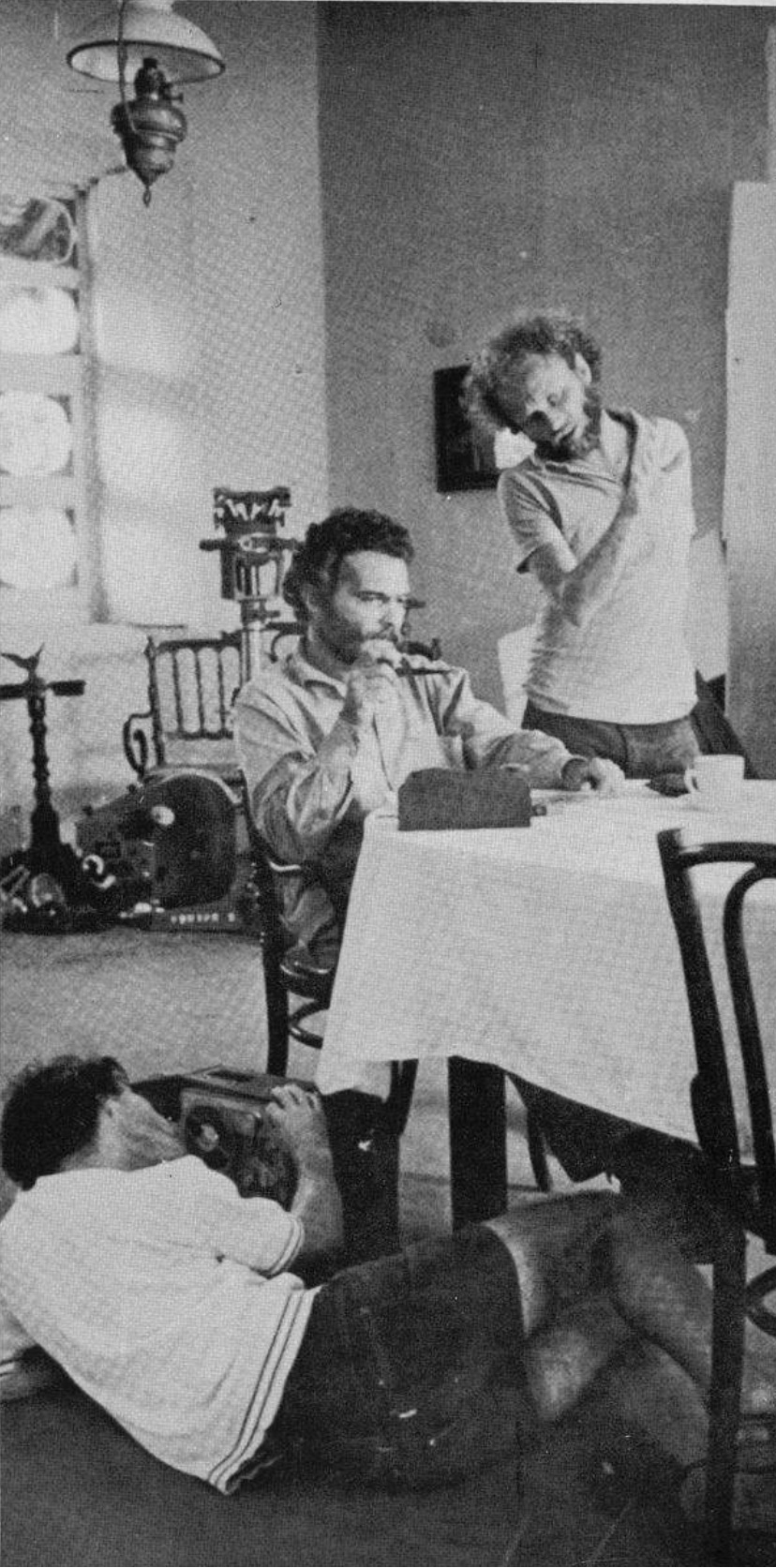
Leon Hirszman during the shooting of S. Bernado

== Career ==
He is best known for directing the 1981 film They Don't Wear Black Tie which won the Special Jury Prize at the 38th Venice International Film Festival.

His other films include Fernanda Montenegro's 1965 film debut The Deceased, the 1972 adaptation of Graciliano Ramos's S. Bernardo and the documentary ABC da Greve.

== Personal life ==
Hirszman died from complications of HIV/AIDS in 1987. He was married with Cláudia Fares Menhem, and had three children: Irma, Maria and João Pedro.

== Filmography ==
=== Feature films ===
Year	English title	Original title	Notes
1965	The Deceased	A Falecida	Debut film
1967	Girl from Ipanema	Garota de Ipanema	
1972	S. Bernardo		
1981	They Don't Wear Black Tie	Eles Não Usam Black-Tie	

=== Other credits ===
Key
†	Indicates a documentary	‡	Indicates a short film

Year	Original title	Language(s)	Notes
1962	Pedreira de São Diogo ^{‡}	Portuguese	Segment of Cinco Vezes Favela (1962).
1964	Maioria Absoluta ^{†}	Portuguese	Short documentary on illiteracy and unequal land distribution in Brazil's countryside.
1969	Nelson Cavaquinho ^{†}	Portuguese	Short documentary on Nelson Cavaquinho.
1969	Sexta-Feira da Paixão, Sábado de Aleluia ^{‡}	Portuguese	Segment of América do Sexo (Sex America) (1969).
1973	Megalópolis ^{†}	Portuguese	Short documentary on urbanization in Brazil, especially in São Paulo and Rio de Janeiro.
1973	Ecologia ^{†}	Portuguese	Short documentary denouncing the exploitation of natural resources in Brazil.
1974	Cantos de Trabalho: Mutirão ^{†}	Portuguese	Short documentary on corn agriculture in Chã Preta, Alagoas. First of three "Cantos de Trabalho" short documentaries.
1976	Cantos de Trabalho: Cana-de-Açúcar ^{†}	Portuguese	Short documentary on sugarcane agriculture in Feira de Santana, Bahia. Second of three "Cantos de Trabalho" short documentaries.
1976	Cantos de Trabalho: Cacau ^{†}	Portuguese	Short documentary on cacao agriculture in Itabuna, Bahia. Third of three "Cantos de Trabalho" short documentaries.
1976	Que País É Este? ^{†}	Portuguese	Brazilian-Italian co-production. Documentary on the history of Brazil.
1978	Rio, Carnaval da Vida ^{†}	Portuguese	Also known as Carnaval do Povo. Short documentary on carnival in Rio de Janeiro.
1982	Partido Alto ^{†}	Portuguese	Filmed in 1976. Short documentary on the partido alto samba subgenre.
1988	Imagens do Inconsciente ^{†}	Portuguese	Filmed between 1983 and 1986. Trilogy (Em Busca do Espaço Cotidiano, No Reino das Mães and A Barca do Sol), documentary on Nise da Silveira's cases.
1990	ABC da Greve ^{†}	Portuguese	Filmed in 1979. Documentary on the 1978-1980 workers' strike in the ABC Region.
1995	Cinema Brasileiro: Mercado Ocupado ^{†}	Portuguese	Filmed in 1975. Short documentary on the contemporary Brazilian film production conditions.
1996	Bahia de Todos os Sambas ^{†}	Portuguese	Co-directed with Paulo César Saraceni. Concert film filmed in Rome, Italy, between 23 and 31 August, 1983, documenting the Bahia de Todos os Sambas festival.
2014	Posfácio: Imagens do Inconsciente ^{†}	Portuguese	Filmed in 1986. Interview with Nise da Silveira.
