= Oduvaldo Vianna Filho =

Brazilian playwright

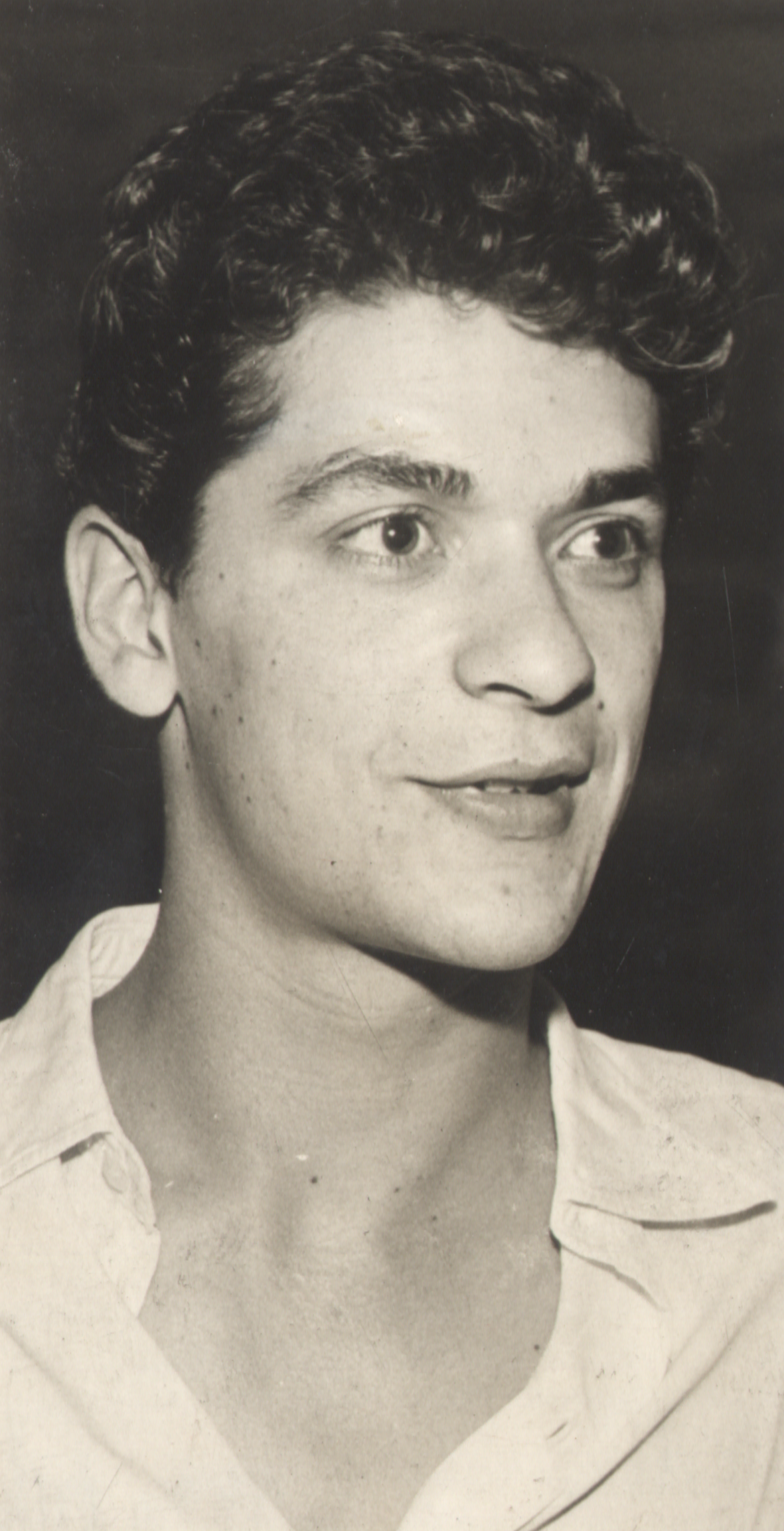
Oduvaldo Viana Filho

Oduvaldo Vianna Filho, known as Vianinha (4 June 1936 – 16 July 1974), was a Brazilian playwright.

Vianinha was born in São Paulo. He started in theater as an actor, in 1955, with the Teatro Paulista do Estudante (São Paulo Students Theatre) group. Polemical and combative, Vianinha was part of Teatro de Arena and debuted as an author in 1959, with Chapetuba Futebol Clube.

In 1973, together with Armando Costa, he created and directed in Rede Globo de Televisão a humorous series called A Grande Família (The Big Family).

His plays A Mão na luva, Allegro desbum, and Rasga coração were repeatedly staged in Brazil. The most critically successful was the last one, Rasga coração, which he ended just a few days before dying of lung cancer. He died in Rio de Janeiro, aged 38.
