= Teatro de Arena =

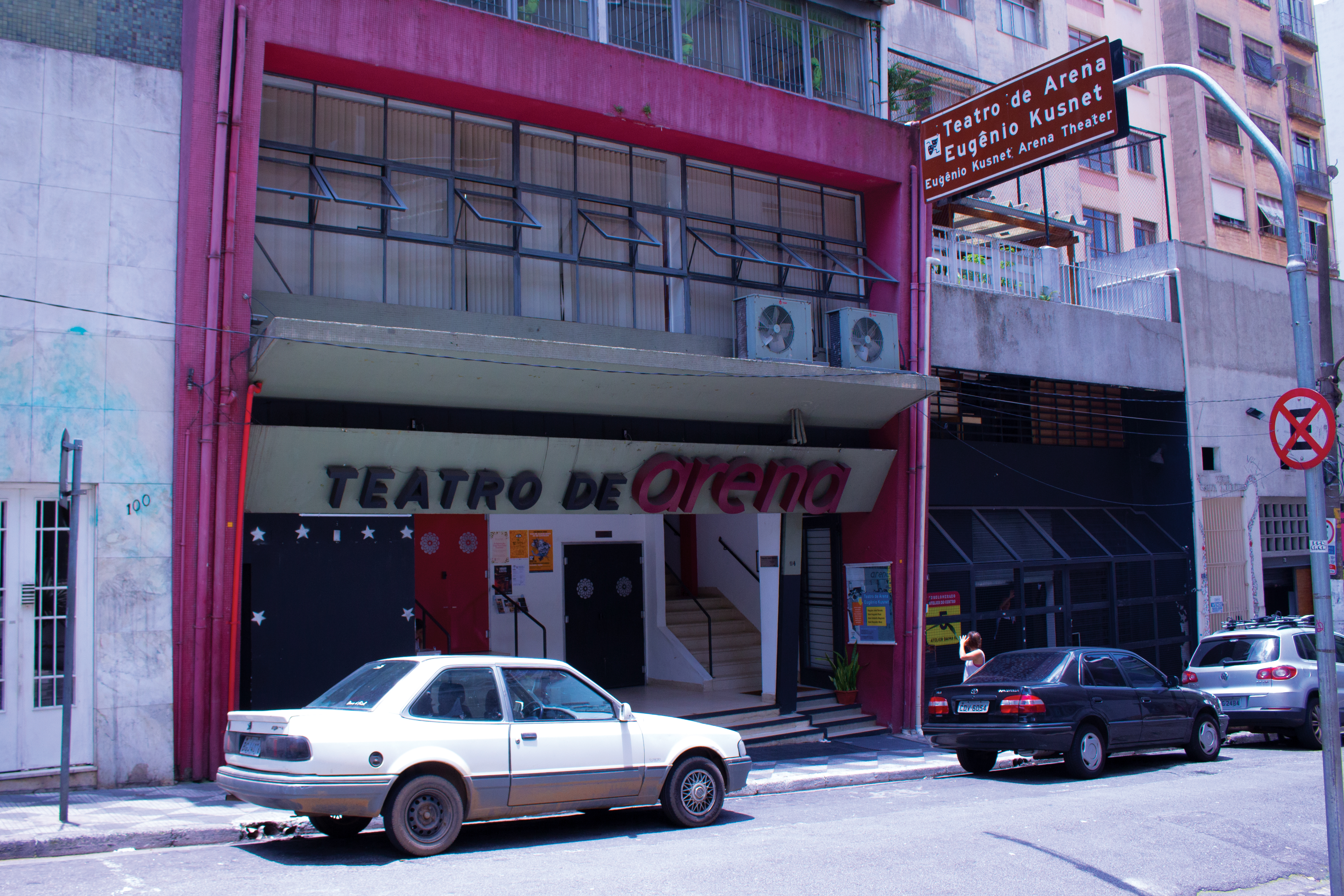
- Location: São Paulo, Brazil
- Opened: 1953
- Closed: 1972

Teatro de Arena was a theatre in São Paulo, Brazil. Established in 1953, it was one of the most important Brazilian theatre groups in the 1950s and 1960s. Its importance stemmed from the rising of Brazilian nationalism promoted by the Vargas era. It performed works by the likes of Renato José Pécora, Augusto Boal and Gianfrancesco Guarnieri, before closing in 1972.

== History ==
The Teatro de Arena was founded in Sāo Paulo in 1953 by It was an alternative form of theater production from the current expensive state of Brazilian theater. Jose Renato was a prominent actor, director and one of the founders whose vision was for the theater and production was to make it more accessible than those productions being put on by the Brazilian Theater Comedy.

The first professional casting the theater company put on was Tonight is Ours in 1953 in MAM Halls, Museum of Modern Art. This early company consisted of José Renato, Sérgio Britto, Henrique Becker, Geraldo Mateus, Renata Blaunstein and Monah Delacy. After two years of performing in makeshift areas, the company finally inaugurates the room of Rua Theodoro Biama in 1955 which is in a renovated garage in front of the Church of the consolation which is in the middle of São Paulo.

The saving of the theater due to economic reasons was credited to Gianfrancesco Guarnieri. He was a young actor and playwright who graduated from the Teatro Paulista do Estudante. Even though Guarnieri is Italian, he was extremely passionate about the path that Brazilian theater was going on. In 1958, They Don't Wear Black-Tie, written by Guarneri was a massive success. The success of the production allowed for the space for the beginning of the Seminars of Dramaturgy movement that was to bring new Brazilian authors to the light. Out of this movement, Oduvaldo Vianna Filho and Flávio Migliaccio emerged.

== Productions ==
Year	Production	Playwright	Director	Notable Facts
1953	This Night is Ours	Stafford Dickens		This is when the company was founded by José Renato, Sergio Britto, Henrique Becker, Geraldo Mateus, Renata Blaunstein, and Mohan Delacy.
1953-1954	The Long Goodbye	Tennessee Williams	José Renato	
	Voulez Vous Jouer Avec Moa? (Would You Like to Play with Me?) (Portuguese title: Uma mulher e três palhaços)	Marcel Achard	José Renato	
	Judas on Holy Saturday	Martins Pena	Sergio Britto	
1956	Of Mice and Men	John Steinbeck	Augusto Boal	This assembly was under the direction of Augusto Boal, who brought in the fresh faces from the Theater of the Student, which included Guarnieri, Vianninha, Flavio Migliaccio, Riva Nimitz, and Milton Gonçalves.
1957	Juno and the Paycock	Sean O'Casey		
1958	They Don't Wear Black-Tie	Gianfrancesco Guarnieri	José Renato	
1959	Chapetuba Futebol Clube		Augusto Boal	Even those this is directed by Boal, the story is by Oduvaldo Vianna Filho.
1959	Gente Como a Gente	Augusto Boal		Story by Roberto Freire, a psychiatrist.
1960	Fogo Frio	Augusto Boal		Story by Benedito Ruy Barbosa
1960	Revolution in South America	Jose Renato		Story by Augusto Boal
1961	The Testament of the Cangaceiro	Augusto Boal		From Chico de Assis
1962	Mister Carrari Rifles	José Renato		Story by Bertolt Brecht
1962	The Mandragora	Augusto Boal		Story by Machiavelli
1964	Tartuffe	Molière		
1965	Arena tells of Zumbi	Boal and Guarnieri		Music used by Edu Lobo
1967-1968	Arena tells of Tiradentes	Boal and Guarnieri		
1968	First São Paulo Fair of Opinion			An event organized by Boal at the Teatro Ruth Escobar.
1968	McBird	Boal		
1968	The Caucasian Chalk Circle	Bertolt Brecht		Story by Barbara Garson, also performed at the Teatro Ruth Escobar.
1968	La Moschetta	Angelo Becolco		This play failed.
1969	The Resistible Rise of Arturo Ui	Bertolt Brecht		This play failed.
1970				International tour in the US
1971	Teatro Jornal- 1st Edition	Augusto Boal		
1971	Arena tells of Bolivar			Due to this being censored by the Military Regime, this is not shown in Brazil.
1972	Sweet Latin America, Latin America	Antônio Pedro		This was made with a collective of the theater.
1972	Drums of the Night	Fernando Peixoto		Story by Bertolt Brecht, staged at multiple theaters.
1972	The Week- These Intrepid Guys and Their Wonderful Week of Modern Art			Story by Carols Queiroz Telles, also staged at multiple theaters.

== Process of Closing ==
The theater had an odd process of falling apart. During the Rio tour of They Don't Wear Black-Tie, Oduvaldo Vianna Filho and Milton Gonçalves left the company and founded the 1961 movement of Popular Centers of Culture (CPCs), by the National Union of Students - UNE. The next person to leave the theater was José Renato. He moved to Rio in 1962 to be head of direction of the National Theater of Comedy - (TNC).

In 1968 and 1969, Guarnieri left the theater, leaving the work to Boal. These were busy years considering there was an international tour through the United States (New York, Berkeley, San Francisco, Kent, Cleveland, Kansas City, Buffalo, Chapaqua), Peru (Lima), and Mexico (Pueblas, Guanaguato, Guadalajara, Monte Rei, Leon, Porto Si, and Morela) with the Arena tells of Zumbi from Guarnieri and Boal, and Arena tells of Bolivar from Boal.

In 1971, when Boal was putting together the script for Arena Conta Bolivar, which did end up banned in Brazil, Boal was arrested and soon after goes into exile. The last production the theater put on was carried out by Núcleo 2 do Arena from 1969. This is when Teatro de Arena passes the reins to the actor Luis Carlos Arutin.

The last two shoes from the theater were Bertolt Brecht's Night Drums and Carlos Queiroz Telles These Intrepid Guys and Their Wonderful Week of Modern Art, however it was presented by Núcleo 2 do Arena. These shows were shown at the São Pedro theater and directed by Fernando Peixoto.

Arena closes its doors completely in 1972 and is bought by the no longer running National Service of Theater - SNT in 1977. As of 1990, the rooms are no longer used to teach theatrical language research processes that add to the cultural life of the region.

== Additional Sources ==
- Panorama of the Brazilian Theater, by Sábato Magaldi - Global Editora
- Small History of the Theater in Brazil (four centuries of theater in Brazil), by Mario Cacciaglia - EDUSP
- Le Théâtre Arena (São Paulo 1953-1977) - Richard du Roux, Aix-en-Provence, Université de Provence, 1991,2 vol., 758 p.- Du "théâtre en rond" au "théâtre populaire"
- «Le théâtre brésilien». In : CORVIN, Michel, Dictionnaire encyclopédique du théâtre, Paris, Bordas, 1st ed., 1991; 2e ed. 1995 (entrées corrigées); Paris, Larousse, 3e ed. .: 1998 (entées corrigés et augmentés); Paris Hachette, 4e ed.: 2007 (entrées augmentés).
