= Prêmio Saci =

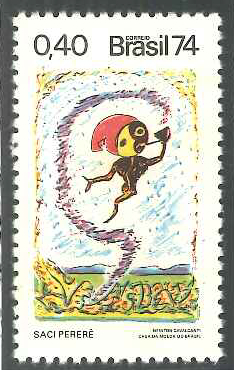
- A Saci in a Brazilian stamp of 1974
- Awarded for: Excellence of Brazilian film and theater production
- Country: Brazil
- Hosted by: O Estado de S. Paulo
- Established: 1951

Prêmio Saci (English: Saci Award), was an award presented annually by O Estado de S. Paulo, to honour the best Brazilian film and theater performers.

== History ==
During the 1950s and 1960s, it was considered the biggest and most prestigious award in Brazilian cinema.

The award recipients were given a statuette of the Saci, a famous figure of Brazilian folklore, suggested by a reader through a competition organized by the newspaper. The trophy was sculpted by the plastic artist Victor Brecheret.

== Awarded (selection) ==
- Inezita Barroso (1953 and 1955)
- Tônia Carrero
- Walmor Chagas (1956)
- Cyro Del Nero
- Jorge Dória
- Odete Lara (1957)
- Eliane Lage (1953) for her performance in Sinhá Moça
- Nydia Licia
- Osvaldo Moles
- Rachel de Queiroz (1954)
- Mário Sérgio (1953)
- Ruth de Souza
- Eva Wilma
