= Cacilda Becker =

Brazilian actress (1921–1969)

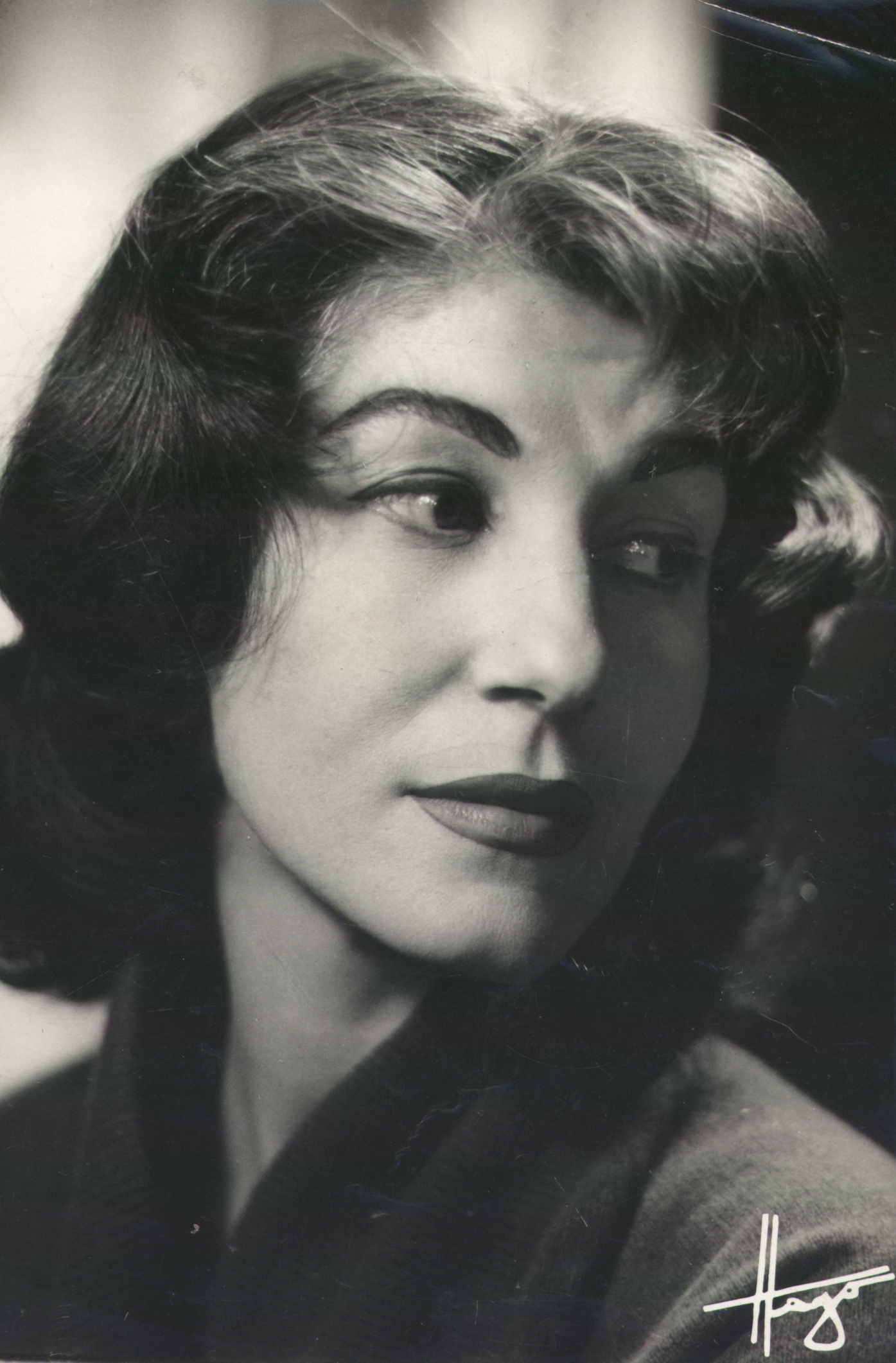
- Becker in 1960
- Born: Cacilda Becker Iaconis; 6 April 1921; Pirassununga, São Paulo, Brazil
- Died: 14 June 1969 (aged 48); São Paulo, Brazil
- Occupation: Actress
- Years active: 1943–1969
- Spouses: Tito Fleury (m. 1947; sep. 1950) Walmor Chagas (m. 1956)
- Children: 2
- Relatives: Cleyde Yáconis (sister)

Cacilda Becker Iaconis (6 April 1921 – 14 June 1969) was a Brazilian actress.

== Life and career ==
Born Cacilda Becker Iaconis, she was the daughter of Italian immigrants, Edmondo Iaconis and Alzira Becker. She had two sisters. One was Cleyde Yáconis, who also became an actress. Her parents' marriage broke up when she was nine years old and her mother was forced to raise the three daughters alone. They settled in the city of Santos. Being the daughter of divorced and poor parents Cacilda could not establish friendships with people of high society, and instead began to frequent the bohemians and avant-garde circles in the city.

Cacilda started as an actress in amateur theater groups and turned professional in 1948. That year, Nydia Lycia turned down a role in the play "Mulher do Próximo" (Women's Next) by Abilio Pereira de Almeida, produced by the Brazilian Comedy Theater (TBC) to not have to kiss or say "lover" in the scene, because this could cost you employment at a major store. Cacilda, who replaced her, demanded to be hired as a professional, ending the old prejudice that serious artist should be dilettante

In 30 years of career, Cacilda performed in 68 plays staged in Rio de Janeiro and São Paulo; made two films ("Luz dos Seus Olhos" - Light in Their Eyes - in 1947 and in "Floradas na Serra" - Sierra Blossoms - in 1954) and a soap opera ("Ciúmes" - Jealousy, 1966). On TV Tupi besides participating in teleteatros, Cacilda inaugurated the Teatro Municipal de São Carlos with the play Waiting for Godot in early 1969.

Cacilda overwhelming passions aroused and had three husbands, the latter Walmor Chagas, who adopted her only daughter, Maria Clara Chagas Becker, born in 1964.

== Death ==
Cacilda suffered a stroke on 6 May 1969 in São Paulo during a performance of the play Waiting for Godot, staged with her husband Walmor Chagas. She was taken to the hospital still wearing her costume. She died after 38 days in a coma and was buried in the Cemetery of Araçá, attended by a crowd of admirers.

== In popular culture ==
Cacilda Becker has already been portrayed as a character in film and television, played by Camila Morgado in the miniseries "Um Só Coração" (One Heart) (2004) and Ada Chaseliov in the film "Brasilia 18%" (2006).
