= They Don't Wear Black Tie =

1981 film directed by Leon Hirszman

- Directed by: Leon Hirszman
- Written by: Leon Hirszman; Gianfrancesco Guarnieri
- Based on: Eles Não Usam Black-Tie by Gianfranco Guarnieri
- Produced by: Leon Hirszman
- Starring: Gianfrancesco Guarnieri; Fernanda Montenegro; Carlos Alberto Riccelli; Bete Mendes
- Cinematography: Lauro Escorel
- Edited by: Eduardo Escorel
- Music by: Radamés Gnattali; Adoniran Barbosa; Chico Buarque; Gianfrancesco Guarnieri
- Production companies: Leon Hirszman Produções; Embrafilme
- Distributed by: Embrafilme
- Release date: September 28, 1981
- Running time: 123 minutes
- Country: Brazil
- Language: Portuguese

Eles Não Usam Black-tie (internationally released as They Don't Wear Black Tie) is a 1981 Brazilian drama film directed by Leon Hirszman, based on Gianfrancesco Guarnieri's play of the same name.

In 2015, the Brazilian Film Critics Association aka Abraccine voted They Don't Wear Black Tie the 14th greatest Brazilian film of all time, in its list of the 100 best Brazilian films.

== Plot ==
The film revolves around a working-class family in São Paulo in 1980. Otávio, a syndicalist leader, and Romana are the parents of Tião, whose girlfriend, Maria, becomes pregnant. Fearing to be fired and thus unable to support his now fiancée, Tião does not participate on a strike, which starts a series of family conflicts.

== Cast ==
- Gianfrancesco Guarnieri as Otávio
- Fernanda Montenegro as Romana
- Carlos Alberto Riccelli as Tião
- Bete Mendes as Maria
- Milton Gonçalves as Bráulio
- Francisco Milani as Sartini
- Lélia Abramo as Maria's mother
- Fernando Ramos da Silva as Maria's brother

== Reception ==
The film entered the competition at the 38th Venice International Film Festival, in which won the Special Jury Prize. It won the Best Film Award at the 3rd Havana Film Festival, at the 26th Valladolid International Film Festival, and shared it with Plae Kao at the 3rd Three Continents Festival.
