= Paulo Autran =

Brazilian actor (1922–2007)

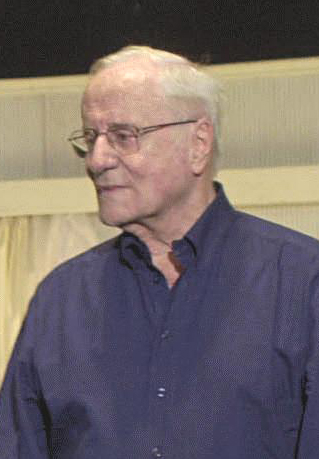
- Born: Paulo Paquet Autran; September 7, 1922; Rio de Janeiro, Brazil
- Died: October 12, 2007 (aged 85); São Paulo, Brazil
- Years active: 1947-2007

Paulo Paquet Autran (September 7, 1922 – October 12, 2007) was a Brazilian film and theater actor. His accomplishments during his life earned him the nickname, "Lord of the Stage."

== Biography ==
Autran was born in Rio de Janeiro, Brazil on September 7, 1922. He initially attended law school and planned to become a diplomat. However, his career path changed when he began performing in amateur theater productions. Autran made the jump to professional theater during the late 1940s. He performed in his first professional play in 1949. This led him to further roles in stage, screen and television. Throughout his long career, Autran appeared in more than 90 stage productions, six telenovelas and nine films. He had one of his most acclaimed film roles in Glauber Rocha's Entranced Earth (Terra em Transe), in 1967.

On stage, Autran frequently acted in Portuguese translations of major plays from all literatures. Among the important roles he did were Shakespeare's King Lear, Galileo Galilei in Bertolt Brecht's eponymous play, and Molière's Harpagon in The Miser, his last stage role.

Autran became known as a character actor later in his theater career, often playing the role of an elderly grandfather or a father figure.

Autran's final film was The Year My Parents Went on Vacation (O Ano em Que Meus Pais Saíram de Férias), released in 2006. He played Mótel, the grandfather of Mauro in the film, which was submitted as Brazil's entry for best foreign film at the Academy Awards in early 2008.

Autran died of lung cancer on October 12, 2007, at Sírio-Libanês Hospital in São Paulo.

== Selected filmography ==
- A Flea on the Scales (1953)
- Hilda Furacão (1998)
