= A Muralha (2000 TV series) =

- Genre: Historical fiction
- Country of origin: Brazil
- Original language: Portuguese
- No. of episodes: 51

Production
- Running time: 40 minutes

Original release
- Network: Rede Globo
- Release: January 4 – March 31, 2000

A Muralha (English: The Conquest) is a Brazilian historical fiction television series that first aired on Rede Globo in 2000.

== Synopsis ==
A hundred years after Europeans set foot in the New World, Brazil still remains largely unexplored. The Conquest recounts the saga of the earliest adventurers who wandered through these unknown lands. Jesuit priests, adventurers seeking gold, slaves and indigenous tribes were entangled in unceasing battles, at a time when laws were made by the sharp edge of a sword.

== Cast ==
| Actor | Role |
|---|---|
| Ada Chaseliov | Leonor |
| Alessandra Negrini | Isabel Olinto |
| Alexandre Borges | Dom Guilherme Schetz |
| André Gonçalves | Apingorá |
| Ângelo Paes Leme | Vasco Antunes |
| Cacá Carvalho | Frei Carmelo |
| Caco Ciocler | Bento Coutinho |
| Carlos Eduardo Dolabella | João Antunes |
| Cecil Thiré | Dom Bartolomeu Fernandes |
| Celso Frateschi | Afonso Góis |
| Cláudia Ohana | Antônia Brites |
| Deborah Evelyn | Basília Olinto Góes |
| Edwin Luisi | Dom Gonçalo Roiz |
| Emiliano Queiroz | Dom Falcão |
| Enrique Diaz | Aimbé |
| Leandra Leal | Beatriz Ataide |
| Leonardo Brício | Tiago Olinto |
| Leonardo Medeiros | Leonel Olinto |
| Letícia Sabatella | Ana Cardoso |
| Maria Maya | Moatira |
| Maria Luísa Mendonça | Margarida Olinto |
| Matheus Nachtergaele | Padre Miguel |
| Mauro Mendonça | Dom Braz Olinto |
| Pedro Paulo Rangel | Mestre Davidão (David Fonseca) |
| Regiane Alves | Rosália Olinto |
| Sérgio Mamberti | Dom Cristovão Rabelo |
| Vera Holtz | Mãe Cândida Olinto |
