= Lícia Magna =

Brazilian actress

- Born: February 22, 1909; Guaxupé, Minas Gerais, Brazil
- Died: July 3, 2007 (aged 98)

Alcina Magna Tetemberg (22 February 1909, Guaxupé - 3 July 2007), better known under the name Lícia Magna, was a Brazilian film and television actress.

== Biography ==
She began her career in amateur theater in the late 1940s. In 1952, she was hired by TV Tupi, and in 1959 she participated in the famous Teatro Brasileiro de Comédia (Brazilian Comedy Theater).

In film, she participated in classics such as Roberto Farias's Assalto ao Trem Pagador (1962), and Hugo Carvana's Vai Trabalhar, Vagabundo! ( 1973).

One of the longest-serving actresses contracted by Rede Globo (since 1966), she stood out in soap operas such as Carinhoso (1973), in which she played the tyrannical Esmeralda. She participated in other soap operas such as Véu de Noiva (1969), Selva de Pedra (1972), Pai Herói (1979), Sétimo Sentido (1982), Roque Santeiro (1985), A Próxima Vítima (1995) and Kubanacan (2003). Her final work on television was a cameo in Cobras & Lagartos, broadcast in 2006.

In her nearly 60-year career, Lícia Magna participated in more than 20 soap operas and 30 films.

She died on July 3, 2007 in Rio, aged 98.

== Filmography ==
Year	Title	Character	Notes
2006	Cobras & Lagartos	Angelina	
2006	Malhação	Neighbor of Jacqueline and Urubu	
2005	Mandrake	Mrs. Fany	Ep: "Amparo"
2004	A Diarista	Old lady	Ep: "Aquele do Supermercado"
2004	Carga Pesada	—N/a	Ep: "A Gente Chega Lá"
2003	Kubanacan	Tia Cotinha Calderón	
2002	A Grande Família	Widow	Ep: "Mata o Véio!"
2002	Malhação	Asylum lady	
2001	As Filhas da Mãe	Grandmother of Setembrino	
2001	Brava Gente	Chiquinha	Ep: "A Quenga e o Delegado"
2000	Zorra Total	Mother of Santinha	
1998	Uma Carta para Deus	Lady on a Fusca	
1998	Você Decide	—N/a	Ep: "Me Lambuza de Batom"
1997	Você Decide	Ana	Ep: "Estrada do Amanhã"
1996	Caça Talentos	Hortência	Ep: "Exterminador de Fadas"
1995	História de Amor	Neighbor of Helena	
1995	A Próxima Vítima	Aunt of Magda Ferreto	
1995	Você Decide	—N/a	Ep: "Veneno Ambiente"
1994	Você Decide	—N/a	Ep: "Mãe Solteira"
1994	Você Decide	—N/a	Ep: "Corações Partidos"
1993	O Mapa da Mina	Neighbor of Zilda	
1992	Tereza Batista	—N/a	
1992	Despedida de Solteiro	Macumbeira	
1991	Meu Bem, Meu Mal	Mrs. Lulu	
1990	Rainha da Sucata	Employee	
1989	Que Rei Sou Eu?	Marie / Colette	
1988	Fera Radical	Dulce	
1987	Mandala	Cleaner for Mercedes	
1986	Cambalacho	Client of Madame Narda	
1985	Um Sonho a Mais	Fake relative of Volpone	
1985	Roque Santeiro	Ciana	
1985	Caso Verdade	Mrs. Clotilde	Ep: "Determinação"
1984	Meu Destino É Pecar	Guiomar	
1984	Caso Verdade	Cousin Celina	Ep: "O Sol para Leonardo"
1984	Caso Verdade	—N/a	Ep: "Para Sempre"
1983	Mário Fofoca	Miss Marple	
1983	Caso Verdade	Anésia	Ep: "Os Filhos de Maria"
1983	Caso Verdade	Dona Luísa	Ep: "História de Pescador"
1982	Sétimo Sentido	Olga	
1982	Caso Verdade	Odete	Ep: "Por uma Fresta de Sol"
1981	Jogo da Vida	Neighbor of Cacilda	
1981	Viva o Gordo	Multiple	
1980	As Três Marias	Lucila	
1980	Coração Alado	Woman of Cônsul no leilão	
1980	Água Viva	Edite	
1980	Carga Pesada	Januária	Ep: "Em Nome da Santa"
1979	Carga Pesada	Mother of Zezinho Patola	Ep: "A Santa"
1979	Pai Herói	Adélia	
1978	Maria, Maria	Maria Rosa	
1976	Planeta dos Homens	Multiple	
1976	O Feijão e o Sonho	Nair	
1975	Gabriela	Relative of Sinhazinha	
1975	Bravo!	Marta di Lorenzo	
1974	Fogo sobre Terra	Siá Isabel	
1974	Caso Especial	Helena	Ep: "A Feiticeira"
1973	Carinhoso	Esmeralda	
1973	Shazan, Xerife e Cia.	—N/a	Ep: "Dinheiro Perigoso"
1973	Caso Especial	Helena	Ep: "A Mãe"
1972	Caso Especial	—N/a	Ep: "História de Subúrbio"
1972	Caso Especial	—N/a	Ep: "Tartufo, o Impostor"
1972	Caso Especial	—N/a	Ep: "O Inimigo do Povo"
1972	Caso Especial	Mother of the fiancée of Armando	Ep: "A Dama das Camélias 73"
1972	Selva de Pedra	Dona Maria Amélia	
1972	O Primeiro Amor	—N/a	
1971	O Homem que Deve Morrer	Clara	
1970	Verão Vermelho	Cota	
1969	Véu de Noiva	—N/a	
1969	A Ponte dos Suspiros	—N/a	
1965	Um Rosto de Mulher	Governess	
1965	Bairro Feliz	Lady	
1965	Rosinha do Sobrado	Martina	
1952-1959	Histórias da Tia Lícia	Lícia	

=== Cinematography ===
Year	Title	Character
1950	A Sombra da Outra	—N/a
1962	Assalto ao Trem Pagador	—N/a
1964	Asfalto Selvagem	—N/a
1964	Viagem aos Seios de Duília	Duília
1967	O Mundo Alegre de Helô	Grandmother of Nando
1968	Copacabana Me Engana	Isabel
1969	Os Paqueras	Mother of Nonô
1970	Um Uísque antes, um Cigarro depois	—N/a
1971	Um Homem sem Importância	Mother
1971	Uma Pantera em Minha Cama	Grandmother
1972	Missão: Matar	Maid
1973	As Moças Daquela Hora	Donga
1973	Caingangue	Paraguayan indigenous girl
1973	O Libertino	Virgínia
1973	Obsessão	Inhabitant of the Castle
1973	Um Virgem na Praça	—N/a
1973	Vai Trabalhar, Vagabundo	—N/a
1974	O Mau-Caráter	—N/a
1974	Relatório de um Homem Casado	—N/a
1975	A Extorsão	Jurema
1975	Enigma para Demônios	Laura
1975	O Casamento	—N/a
1975	Uma Mulata Para Todos	Cartomante
1976	As Massagistas Profissionais	Maria
1976	Dona Flor e Seus Dois Maridos	Filó
1977	Ódio	Aracy
1977	Quem Matou Pacífico?	Chinesa
1978	As Taradas Atacam	Passageira
1978	Manicures a Domicílio	—N/a
1980	Prova de Fogo	Avó de Sandra
1981	O Beijo no Asfalto	Judith
1983	Atrapalhando a Suate	Lady in the bus
2003	TPM: Tensão Pré-Matrimonial	—N/a
2004	Mater Dei	Dona Nêna
2008	Casa da Mãe Joana	Widow (posthumous release)

== Theater ==
Main works

Year	Title	Authorship
1948	O Picapau Amarelo	Monteiro Lobato
1948	Yayá Boneca	Ernani Fornari
1949	A Revolta dos Brinquedos	Pernambuco de Oliveira and Pedro Veiga
1949	Alice no País das Maravilhas	Lewis Carroll
1949	O Carteiro do Rei	Rabindranath Tagore
1949	O Picapau Amarelo	Monteiro Lobato
1949	Onde Canta o Sabiá	Gastão Tojeiro
1954	As Quatro Irmãs	—N/a
1960	As Três Irmãs	Anton Tchekov
1960	Don João Tenório	José Zorrilla
1961	Boca de Ouro	Nelson Rodrigues
1962	O Pagador de Promessas	Dias Gomes
1962	Bonitinha, mas Ordinária	Nelson Rodrigues
1963	O Círculo de Giz	Bertolt Brecht
1967	O Sétimo Dia	—N/a
1970	Miss, Apesar de Tudo, Brasil	Maria Clara Machado
1970–1971	A Teia de Aranha	Agatha Christie
1978	O Chifrudo	Miguel M. Abrahão
1985	Assim É...(Se Lhe Parece)	Luigi Pirandello
1994	Trilogia do Terror	Vic Amor Militello
1994	A Alma Quando Sonha É Teatro	Márcio Vianna
1995-1997	No Reino Encantado de Papai Noel	Carlos Henrique Casanova
1997	Por Falta de Roupa Nova Passei o Ferro na Velha	Abílio Fernandes
2000–2001	Por Falta de Roupa Nova Passei o Ferro na Velha	Abílio Fernandes
2000	Teia de Aranha	Agatha Christie
2002	Laranja Mecânica	Anthony Burgess
2003	Chá de Caridade	Ângelo Matos
2004	Por Falta de Roupa Nova Passei o Ferro na Velha	Abílio Fernandes
