= Deus Nos Acuda (1992 TV series) =

Brazilian telenovela

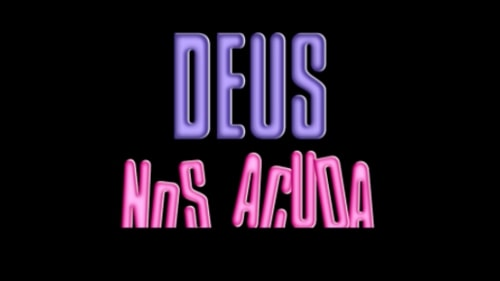
- Deus Nos Acuda
- Genre: Telenovela; Romantic comedy; Fantasy; Suspense
- Created by: Silvio de Abreu
- Directed by: Jorge Fernando
- Opening theme: "Canta Brasil", by Gal Costa
- Composers: Alcyr Pires; Vermelho David Nasser
- Country of origin: Brazil
- Original language: Portuguese
- No. of episodes: 178

Production
- Producer: Alcides Nogueira Maria Adelaide Amaral
- Running time: 50 minutes
- Production company: Central Globo de Produção

Original release
- Network: Rede Globo
- Release: 31 August 1992 – 26 March 1993

Deus Nos Acuda is a Brazilian telenovela produced by TV Globo and shown from August 31, 1992 to March 26, 1993, in 178 chapters. It replaced Perigosas Peruas and was replaced by O Mapa da Mina, making it the 47th “seven o'clock soap opera” shown by the network.

Written by Silvio de Abreu, with the collaboration of Alcides Nogueira and Maria Adelaide Amaral, it was directed by Jorge Fernando, Marcelo Travesso and Rogério Gomes. It was also directed by Jorge Fernando.

It featured Glória Menezes, Francisco Cuoco, Marieta Severo, Cláudia Raia, Edson Celulari, Dercy Gonçalves, Cláudio Corrêa e Castro and Jorge Dória.

== Plot ==
In Heaven, Celestina is the angel responsible for Brazil. When she hears God threatening to send her to the country she was supposed to rescue from chaos, she asks the angel Gabriel for help. Gabriel convinces the Almighty to let Celestina stay in heaven for another six months, but on one condition: without disrespecting the free will that every human being should have, she would have to change a Brazilian citizen, making him honest and good-natured.

Using a television set, where she can keep an eye on all Brazilians, Celestina randomly chooses the beautiful Maria Escandalosa, daughter of Tomás, a couple of crooks from Santos. Convinced that she could transform Maria's character, Celestina bypasses divine laws and begins to watch over the young woman's life on Earth. However, the trickster doesn't know that she is the object of divine attention, let alone that she is being watched day and night.

Maria gets involved with playboy Ricardo Bismark. He is the eldest son of Otto Bismark, a millionaire nicknamed "Bluebeard" because he is suspected of killing his two ex-wives: the first, Felicia, was Ricardo's mother and Felix's sister; the second, Eugenia, was the mother of Igor, Ully and Yeda. There are several attempts to establish charges against Otto and, apart from Ricardo, the socialite Baby Bueno, Eugênia's sister, is the main person who wants to put him in jail. The mutual hatred they both feel for each other ends up turning into overwhelming love, which leaves Baby even more confused. He has Felix as an ally, but he has to face a major opponent: Elvira, a mysterious woman and Otto's secretary, who, as well as being faithful, is in love with him. Over the course of the plot, Elvira reveals herself to be a dangerous woman, capable of doing anything to marry Otto and become the new Lady Bismark, blackmailing him to do so. However, the mysterious Danilo comes into her life willing to stop all her evil deeds. Danilo is the “exterminating angel” who assumes the identity of Elvira's dead brother - whom she hasn't seen since she was a child - in order to stop her. However, while trying to fulfill his mission, he ends up falling in love with Valquíria, Baby's shy and nerdy daughter.

Author Sílvio de Abreu also brought back the character Dona Armênia, from Rainha da Sucata, in this plot. After widowing Seu Moreiras, the gossipy woman moves to Santos and becomes the owner of a building in the city's port area, where Maria and Tomás live. Also living in the building are the brothers Paco - in love with Maria - and Laureta, the prostitute Gilda and her flatmate Clarisse, and the four friends who share the rent: Hugo, Igor, Zelito and his brother Jasão. Strict with her tenants and fond of meddling in their lives, Dona Armenia drives everyone crazy, until the return of her three “little girls” Gérson, Gera and Gino, who end up moving back in with their mother, but to everyone's surprise, Gino returns from Europe dressed as “Gina”. Santos is also home to the dangerous Quaresma, a nightclub owner who exploits his employees, including Gilda, who ends up finding love in the arms of Félix, a man much older than her.

As the plot progressed, a great mystery began to revolve around the identity of the Lion, the leader of a criminal organization and the mastermind of several million-dollar scams. In addition to Otto, Elvira, Danilo and Quaresma, the couple Heitor and Kelly Garcia are the main suspects.

== Production ==
Launched during a period of significant political turmoil due to the scandals involving then-President Fernando Collor de Mello, the telenovela incorporated critiques of the political climate of the time into its storyline. One notable political critique was featured in the opening sequence, which depicted a high-society party being overwhelmed by a flood of mud.

To create this opening, the production team used a mixture of grated Styrofoam, black paint, aniline, and alcohol to simulate mud. The sequence was filmed with five cameras, and the recordings for this opening alone took eight days to complete.

Following the impeachment of President Fernando Collor, the political commentary in the storyline diminished. While there was speculation that the narrative would continue addressing political issues and corruption prevalent in the country, this direction was not pursued. Instead, Silvio de Abreu shifted the focus more toward comedy and drama.

During the airing of Deus nos Acuda in the 7 p.m. time slot, actor Raul Gazolla, who portrayed the character Paco Gutierrez, experienced a personal tragedy. His then-wife, Daniella Perez, who was acting in the 8 p.m. telenovela De Corpo e Alma, was murdered on December 28, 1992.

== Cast ==
Actor/Actress	Character
Cláudia Raia	Maria Rodrigues (Maria Escandalosa)
Edson Celulari	Ricardo Goulart Bismark
Glória Menezes	Bárbara Silveira Bueno Bismark (Baby Bueno)
Francisco Cuoco	Otto Bismark
Marieta Severo	Elvira Ferreira Bismark
Dercy Gonçalves	Celestina
Jorge Dória	Tomás Euclides Rodrigues
Diogo Vilela	Danilo Ferreira (false) / Exterminator Angel
Marisa Orth	Valquíria Silveira Bueno
Raul Gazolla	Paco Gutierrez
Aracy Balabanian	Dona Armênia Giovanni
Ary Fontoura	Félix Goulart
Cláudio Corrêa e Castro	Arcanjo Gabriel
Louise Cardoso	Gilda
Emiliano Queiroz	Quaresma
Regina Braga	Clarisse
Cláudio Fontana	Igor Silveira Bismark
Mylla Christie	Ully Silveira Bismark
Flávio Silvino	Hugo
Tatiana Issa	Yeda Silveira Bismark
Luigi Baricelli	Zelito
Paula Manga	Sabrina
Maria Cláudia	Kelly Garcia
Gracindo Júnior	Heitor Garcia
Jandir Ferrari	Gino Giovanni / Gina
Gerson Brenner	Gerson Giovanni
Marcello Novaes	Geraldo Giovanni (Gera)
Paulo César Grande	Wagner
Cristina Mutarelli	Laureta Gutierrez
Eduardo Martini	Cherub
Carmem Verônica	Xena Gusmão
Adelaide Chiozzo	Juscelina
Oscar Magrini	Marco
Jairo Mattos	Ivan
Mauro Porrino	Gilson
Edgard Amorim	Jasão
Cléa Simões	Pérola
Hilda Rebello	Violante
Yeda Dantas	Aurora
João Rebello	Nicolau Silveira Bueno
Fernanda Rodrigues	Maria Eduarda Garcia (Duda)

=== Special appearances ===
Actor/Actress	Character
Jorge Fernando	Brazil
Débora Bloch	Roberta
Maria Amélia Brito	Eugênia Bismark (only in photos)
Luiz Guilherme	Otávio Ferraz
Fábio Junqueira	Oswaldo
Maurício do Valle	Chief of police Esteves
Marcos Wainberg	Dr. Lacerda
Marcela Muniz	Edith
Elizabeth Henreid	Minouche
Carvalhinho	Joca
Carlos Kroeber	Alberto
Carlos Zara	Dr. Alfredo
Ítalo Rossi	Maurício Stein
Benjamin Cattan	Alberto
Hélio Ary	Dr. Jamil
Norma Geraldy	Dolores Sierra
Maria Helena Pader	Carmen
Mauro Gorini	Beto Pires
Rodolfo Bottino	Rombole
Solange Couto	Manon
Lulu Pavarin	Nagiba Boca de Bule
Jussara Moreira	Antonácia Pasqualim
Paulo Reis	Edmar
Lucy Fontes	Gina
Paulo Gracindo	American angel
Odete Lara	American angel
Célia Biar	French angel
Ruth Escobar	Portuguese angel
Ilka Soares	Dr. Alfredo's wife
Juan Daniel	Priest
Roberto Lopes	Police officer
Dary Reis	Chief of police of São José do Barreiro
Sílvia Salgado	Nicolau's school principal
Leina Krespi	Armenia's neighbor in the Santana district
Luiz Baccelli	catraieiro
Malu Valle	Baby's lawyer
Marcelo Barros	Igor's friend
Waldemar Berditchevsky	Sky elevator attendant
Zeni Pereira	Safira
Faustão	himself

== Reprise ==
It was re-aired in a condensed format, consisting of 80 chapters, on Vale a Pena Ver de Novo from November 8, 2004, to February 25, 2005, replacing Terra Nostra and being succeeded by Laços de Família.

Until December 2004, SBT's soap opera Maria do Bairro surpassed the rerun of Deus Nos Acuda during the thirty minutes in which their schedules overlapped. Throughout the last week of November 2004, SBT maintained the lead, with an average of 16 points compared to Globo's 14.

== Soundtrack ==
=== National ===
Cover: Cláudia Raia.

Deus Nos Acuda Nacional

Soundtrack album by Various artists
- Released: September 1992
- Genre: Various
- Length: 50:20
- Label: Som Livre

No.	Title	Writer(s)	Character	Length
1.	"Não Olhe Assim"	Leandro e Leonardo	Ully	3:15
2.	"Rio e Canoa"	Fábio Jr.	Paco	4:21
3.	"Ainda Lembro" (Ft. Ed Motta)	Marisa Monte	Ricardo	4:00
4.	"Deus Nos Acuda"	Tadeu Matthias	Location: Santos	3:11
5.	"Vento Ventania"	Biquíni Cavadão	Igor	4:18
6.	"Falso"	Brigitte	Tomás	3:22
7.	"Heaven Seven"	A Caverna	Celestina	2:53
8.	"Brigas" (Ft Cauby Peixoto)	Altemar Dutra	Félix and Gilda	3:10
9.	"La Barca""	Luis Miguel	Ricardo and Maria Escandalosa	3:28
10.	"Maria Escandalosa"	Ney Matogrosso	Maria Escandalosa	3:06
11.	"Taça de Veneno"	Guilherme Arantes	Elvira	4:10
12.	"Paixão Esquecida"	Yahoo	Clarisse	4:50
13.	"Canta Brasil"	Gal Costa	Opening	3:13
14.	"Balada do Otto"	A Caverna	Otto	2:50

=== International ===
Cover: Edson Celulari.

Deus Nos Acuda Internacional

Soundtrack album by Various artists
- Released: December 1992
- Genre: Various
- Length: 56:56
- Label: Som Livre

No.	Title	Writer(s)	Character	Length
1.	"Would I Lie To You"	Charles & Eddie	Kelly	3:36
2.	"Mr. Loverman"	Shabba Ranks	Gerson	5:38
3.	"Friday I'm in Love"	The Cure	Geraldo	3:30
4.	"Bang Bang"	David Sanborn	Maria Escandalosa	4:00
5.	"I Fall All Over Again"	Dan Hill	Paco e Clarisse	4:13
6.	"I Get a Kick Out Of You" ((Ft. Oscar Peterson Trio))	Louis Armstrong	Baby	4:16
7.	"Hard Fight"	Lorrie Company	In general	2:22
8.	"Crybaby"	Information Society	Ricardo e Maria Escandalosa	5:08
9.	"My Lovin' (You're Never Gonna Get It)"	En Vogue	Location: Santos	4:42
10.	"You Won't See Me Crying"	Wilson Phillips	Ully	3:48
11.	"Work To Do"	Vanessa Williams	Location: São Paulo	4:38
12.	"Good Enough"	Bobby Brown	Gino	4:58
13.	"Decadence Avec Elegance"	Deborah Blando	Sabrina	3:18
14.	"Frantic Temptation"	Peter Trad	Elvira	2:48

== Awards ==
Award	Year	Actor	Categorie	Result
Troféu APCA	1992	Jorge Dória	Best supporting actor	Winner
Troféu Imprensa	1993	Cláudia Raia	Best Actress	Indicated
Troféu Imprensa	1993	Glória Menezes	Best Actress	Winner
