= Monique Lafond =

Brazilian actress

- Lafond in 2015
- Born: Monique de Gormaz Lafond; 9 February 1954 (age 72); Rio de Janeiro, Brazil
- Occupations: Actress, model, acting teacher, theatre producer

Monique de Gormaz Lafond (born 9 February 1954) is a Brazilian actress, model, acting teacher, and theatre producer.

== Biography ==
Lafond was born on 9 February 1954 in Rio de Janeiro. Of French background, she began her career as a girl doing commercials. At 11, she participated in the musical “Música Divina Música”, a version of The Sound of Music. Soon after, she worked for 3 years alongside Glauce Rocha, Darlene Glória, and Jorge Dória in “Os Pais Abstratos”, by Pedro Bloch and directed by João Bittencourt. From there, she worked in dozens of plays, such as La Cage aux Folles, Constantina, Um Edifício chamado 200, Ó Abre Alas, and others. In 1968, Lafond made her debut in theatre with the film Até Que o Casamento Nos Separe by Flávio Tambellini. In 1970, she became a professional model.

She was one of the muses for Walter Hugo Khouri as he was directing his films. Her first film with the director was Paixão e Sombras in 1977. They collaborated in other films together including Eros, O Deus do Amor and Eu e As Feras. In television, Lafond made her debut there in 1973 with the telenovela Os Ossos do Barão on TV Globo. Since then, she has worked on various novelas with the network, including Fogo Sobre Terra, A Moreninha, Coração Alado, Brega e Chique, Que Rei Sou Eu?, Coração de Estudante, Belíssima, Duas Caras, Páginas da Vida, and Caras & Bocas, among others. In October 1975, she did a semi-nude photoshoot for the magazine Ele Ela after previously featured on the magazine's cover in September 1974. In April 1981, she posed completely nude in Armação dos Búzios for the cover of Playboy.

In 2006, Lafond made an appearance on Malhação as a social assistant. She also has done various appearances on Zorra Total on Lady Kate's (who is played by Katiuscia Canoro) block while still making appearances on Globo's novelas. After temporarily stepping away from theatres after performing "Ó Abre Alas" in 1999, she returned to theatre in 2008 with the special "Por quê Não?" at Teatro Ipanema in Rio de Janeiro. In 2010, she performed in Porto Alegre in the special "Mario Quintana, o Poeta das coisas simples", alongside Anilza Leoni, Selma Lopes, Tamara Taxman, and Sergio Miguel Braga.

Starting in 1997, she went on to dedicate herself to administering scenic interpretation courses, initially for elderly people in Rio de Janeiro at the Office of the Teatro na Idade da Sabedoria. Beginning in 2008, however, she began to give classes for children and adults at her Oficina de Teatro in Copacabana. From there, she has directed various theatrical specials with her students in the cast, such as Lysistrata by Aristophanes, which was performed in November 2009 at the Teatro Henriqueta Brieba (RJ).

== Filmography ==
=== Television ===
Year	Title	Role	Notes
1973	Os Ossos do Barão	Gláucia	
1974	Fogo Sobre Terra	Judy	
1975	A Moreninha	Marina	
1975	Bravo!	Débora	
1977–88	Os Trapalhões	Various roles	
1980	Coração Alado	Danúbia	
1982	Nem Rebeldes, Nem Fiéis	Ianthe	
1984	Santa Marta Fabril S.A.		
1985	Antônio Maria	Madalena	
1985	Jogo do Amor	Paula	
1987	Brega & Chique	Marinalva Pombo	
1988	Vale Tudo	Dolores	
1988	Tarcísio &amp; Glória	Dolores	Episode: "O Grande Golpe"
1989	Que Rei Sou Eu?	Marquesa La Provence	
1990	Araponga	Elizabeth	
1991	O Fantasma da Ópera	Teresa Fourton	
1993	Sonho Meu	Maitê	
1994	Quatro por Quatro	Virna	
1995	Você Decide	Vera	Episode: "Pacto de Silêncio"
1996	Você Decide		Episode: "Amor Por Correspondência"
1997	A Filha do Demônio	Rachel	
1997	A Sétima Bala	Amália	
1997	Direito de Vencer	Élide	
1998	Você Decide		Episode: "Verdades e Mentiras"
2002	Coração de Estudante	Drª Eliane	
2004	Linha Direta Justiça	Dirce Grotkowski	Episode: "O Naufrágio do Bateau Mouche"
2005	Belíssima	Tereza	
2006	Pé na Jaca!	Yvonne	
2007	Paraíso Tropical	Solange	
2007	Duas Caras	Celinha	
2008	Os Mutantes: Caminhos do Coração	Nilza	
2008	Casos e Acasos	Anita	Episode: "A Blitz, o Presente e os Filhos"
2008	Zorra Total	Otília	
2009	Caras e Bocas	Simone's aunt	Guest appearance
2010	A Vida Alheia	Tereza Montiel	Episodes: "O Sequestro" & "Porque Temos Fé"
2010	Ti Ti Ti	Client of Jacques Leclair	Guest appearance
2011	Aquele Beijo	Client of Mãe Iara	Guest appearance
2012	Aventuras do Didi	Client of Entrega Rápidas	Episode: "29 de julho"
2014	Em Família	Justice of the peace	Guest appearance
2014	Chiquititas	Gilda Ramos	
2014	Alto Astral	Wilma Gambone	Guest appearance
2015-19	República do Peru	Arlinda	
2018	Apocalipse	Olinda Aragão	

=== Film ===
Year	Title	Role
1968	Até que o Casamento nos Separe	Clarice
1969	Um Uísque Antes, um Cigarro Depois	
1970	Ascensão e Queda de um Paquera	Renata
1971	Bonga, o Vagabundo	
1972	Os Machões	
1972	Salve-se Quem Puder - Rally da Juventude	Kátia
1972	Independência ou Morte	
1973	Aladim e a Lâmpada Maravilhosa	Marina
1973	Robin Hood, o Trapalhão da Floresta	Catarina Reis Leão
1974	As Moças Daquela Hora	Léa
1975	Com um Grilo na Cama	Anete
1975	Enigma para Demônios	Elza
1975	Ipanema, Adeus	Gilda
1975	Ladrão de Bagdá, O Magnífico	Jasmim
1975	Motel	Dilma
1977	O Trapalhão nas Minas do Rei Salomão	Glória
1977	Emanuelle Tropical	Emmanuelle
1977	O Mistério das Quatro Mulheres	
1977	O Pequeno Polegar contra o Dragão Vermelho	Senhorita Su Yang
1977	Paixão e Sombras	Ana
1979	Amante Latino	Bárbara
1979	Bachianas Brasileiras: Meu Nome É Villa-Lobos	
1979	Eu Matei Lúcio Flávio	Margarida Maria
1980	A Mulher Sensual	Photographer
1980	Giselle	Ana Clementina
1980	Um Menino... uma Mulher	Rafaela
1981	Eros, o Deus do Amor	Lilit
1982	Luz del Fuego	Lawyer
1982	Os Campeões	Cristina
1982	Retrato Falado de uma Mulher sem Pudor	Paula Marcondes
1983	Fuscão Preto	Cleide
1983	Prazeres Permitidos	Marina
1983	Tudo na Cama	Cassandra
1984	Amor Maldito	Fernanda
1984	Lídia e Seu Primeiro Amante	Monique
1984	Memoirs of Prison	Francesa
1984	Mulher de Proveta	Ana Maria
1986	Fulaninha	Mulher da Boate
1987	Eu	Renata
1987	Sonhos de Menina-Moça	Marta
1988	O Diabo na Cama	Wife
1991	I Don't Want to Talk About It Now	Dora
1992	A Serpente	Lígia
1992	Kickboxer 3: The Art of War	Flavia
1993	Butterfly	
2001	As Feras	Sylvie
2003	Lara	Lara's mom
2009	Fumando Espero	Herself
2012	Billi Pig	Verônica Abdala
2016	Fantasias de Papel	Herself
2019	Cinéfilo	Liv
2024	Segredos	Trudy

== Theatre ==
Year	Title	Director
1965-1966	Música Divina Música	Harry Woolever
1967-1969	Os Pais Abstratos	João Bethencourt
1969	Snow White	Jair Pinheiro
1969	The Ugly Duckling	Aurimar Rocha
1970	O Palhacinho e a Onça	Jair Pinheiro
1970	Pinnochio	Jair Pinheiro
1970	Cinderella	Roberto de Castro
1970	Aladdin e a Lâmpada Maravilhosa	Washington Guilherme
1972	As Filhas da Mãe	Ronaldo Ciambroni
1973	O Genro que Era Nora	Aurimar Rocha
1973	Uma Vez Por Semana	Gugu Olimecha
1974	O Jogo do Sexo	José Renato
1974	Um Edifício Chamado 200	José Renato
1978	Constantina	Cecil Thiré
1988	Tributo	Antônio Mercado
1988	Uma Suíte para Duas	Maria Pompeu
1987	As Filhas da Mãe	Ronaldo Ciambroni
1989	Topless	Jacques Lagoa
1990	Por Falta De Roupa Nova, Passei o Ferro Na Velha	Paulo Afonso de Lima
1990	De Gororoba a Caviar	Paulo Afonso de Lima
1991	Rapunzel	Jean Garret
1991	Fé Na Crise E Pau Na Gente	Abílio Fernandes
1992	Das Duas Uma	Gugu Olimecha
1994-1995	A Gaiola das Loucas	Jorge Fernando
1996	A Louca De Bonsucesso	Gugu Olimecha
1996	Fim de Semana na Casa Da Zélia	Kiko Jaess
1997	Por Falta De Roupa Nova, Passei o Ferro Na Velha	Paulo Afonso de Lima
1998	A Cigarra e a Formiga	Roberto
1998	O Abre-Alas	Charles Möeller
2000	Mensagens de Amor	Cyrano Rosalém
2001	O Santo e o Bicheiro	José Renato
2008	Por que Não?	Lígia Ferreira
2009	Mário Quintana - o poeta das coisas simples	Rubens Lima Junior
2017	Quatro na Kitnet	

== Awards and nominations ==
- Air France Awards for Best Actress for Eu matei Lúcio Flávio.
