= Fifth power =

Fifth power may refer to:

- Fifth power (algebra), the result of multiplying five instances of a number together
- Fifth force, the hypothetical fifth basic force of physics after proven four force
- The 5th Power, a 1978 album by Lester Bowie
- The Fifth Power (film), a 1962 film by Alberto Pieralisi
