= O Astro =

O Astro may refer to:

- O Astro (2011 TV series), a Brazilian telenovela
- O Astro (1977 TV series), a Brazilian telenovela
