= Bravo! (TV series) =

- Genre: Telenovela
- Created by: Janete Clair; Gilberto Braga
- Directed by: Fábio Sabag; Reynaldo Boury
- Starring: Carlos Alberto; Aracy Balabanian; Neuza Amaral; Carlos Eduardo Dolabella; Arlete Salles; Bete Mendes; Cláudio Cavalcanti; Marcelo Picchi
- Country of origin: Brazil
- Original language: Portuguese
- No. of episodes: 197

Production
- Running time: 45 minutes

Original release
- Network: Rede Globo
- Release: 16 June 1975 – 30 January 1976

Bravo! is a Brazilian telenovela produced and broadcast by Rede Globo. It premiered on 16 June 1975 and ended on 30 January 1976, with a total of 179 episodes. It's the sixteenth "novela das sete" to be aired at the timeslot. It is created by Janete Clair and Gilberto Braga, directed by Fábio Sabag with Reynaldo Boury.

== Cast ==
Actor	Character
Carlos Alberto	Clóvis Di Lorenzo
Aracy Balabanian	Cristina Lemos
Neuza Amaral	Fabiana Di Lorenzo
Carlos Eduardo Dolabella	Eduardo Ribas (Edu)
Arlete Salles	Myrian Serpa
Cláudio Cavalcanti	Maurício
Bete Mendes	Lia Di Lorenzo
Marcelo Picchi	Henrique (Rick)
Grande Otelo	Malaquias
Lupe Gigliotti	Dalva
Ítalo Rossi	Professor Paes Duarte
Heloísa Helena	Eugênia Arantes
Luiz Baccelli	Nelson Bávaro
Daisy Lúcidi	Loretta Cardoso (Lolô)
José Augusto Branco	Ronaldo
Teresa Cristina Arnaud	Sheila Serpa Arantes
Reinaldo Gonzaga	Jorge
Bibi Vogel	Alice
Brandão Filho	Santiago Ribas
Lícia Magna	Marta Di Lorenzo
Apolo Correia	Guido Di Lorenzo
Joyce de Oliveira	Dona Alcinda
Roberto Maya	Dr. Sérgio Aguiar
Abel Pêra	Frederico Vieira
Mary Daniel	Noêmia
Antônio Patiño	Detetive Orlando Salgado
Suzy Arruda	Lady Mildred / Bete Bochecha
Fernando José	Josué
Irma Alvarez	Suzy
Paulo Padilha	Walter
Arnaldo Weiss	Lourival
Monique Lafond	Roberta (Betinha)
Ada Chaseliov	Ida
Sérgio Fonta	Carlos Vieira (Carlinhos)
Elisa Fernandes	Ângela
