= Marisa Orth =

Brazilian actress and host (born 1963)

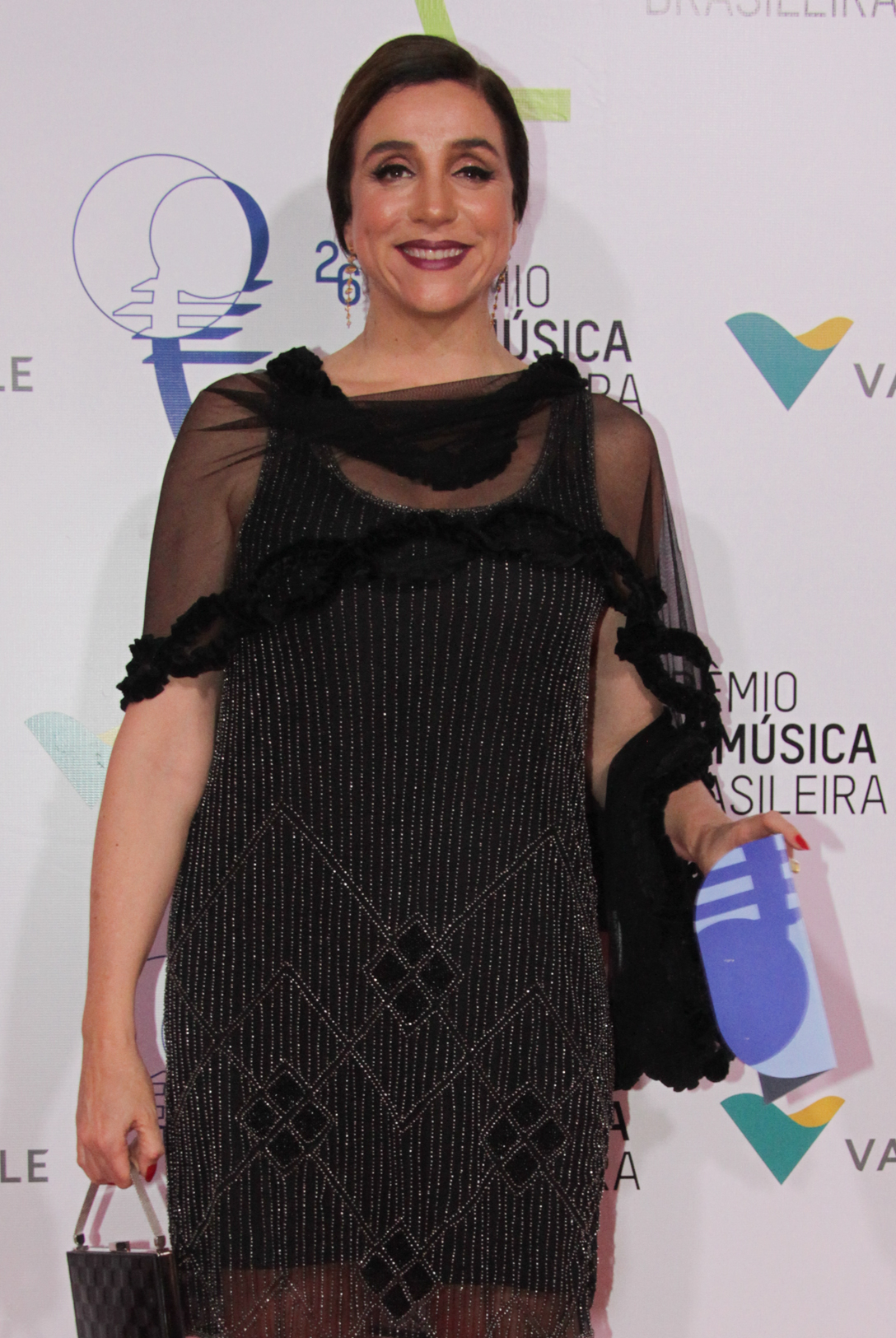
- Orth in 2015
- Born: Marisa Domingos Orth; 21 October 1963 (age 62); São Paulo, Brazil
- Occupations: Actress; singer; TV host
- Years active: 1983–present
- Spouse: Evandro Pereira (m. 1991; div. 2003)
- Children: 1

Marisa Domingos Orth (born 21 October 1963) is a Brazilian actress, singer and TV host.

== Selected filmography ==
- Rainha da Sucata (1990)
- I Don't Want to Talk About It Now (1991)
- Deus nos Acuda (1992)
- Sai de Baixo (1996)
- Por Trás do Pano (1999)
- Durval Discos (2002)
- So Normal (2003)
- Os Aspones (2004)
- Toma Lá, Dá Cá (2007)
- S.O.S. Emergência (2010)
- Família Vende Tudo (2011)
- Sangue Bom (2013)
- Dupla Identidade (2014)
- The Book of Life (2014; Brazilian Dub)
- Haja Coração (2016)
- Tempo de Amar (2017)
- Bom Sucesso (2019)
- Além da Ilusão (2022)
- Elemental (2023; Brazilian Dub)
