= Márcia Cabrita =

Brazilian actress

- Born: Márcia Martins Alves; 20 January 1964; Niterói, Rio de Janeiro, Brazil
- Died: 10 November 2017 (aged 53); Rio de Janeiro, Brazil
- Occupation: Actress
- Years active: 1992–2017
- Spouse: Ricardo Parente (m. 2000; div. 2004)
- Children: 1

Márcia Martins Alves (20 January 1964 – 10 November 2017), known professionally as Márcia Cabrita, was a Brazilian film, television and theater actress known mostly for her comedic roles.

== Biography ==
Márcia Martins Alves was born in Niterói on 20 January 1964, to a family of Portuguese descent, being the second of two sisters. She took acting lessons during her youth, and made her debut in television in 1992, on Rede Globo's miniseries As Noivas de Copacabana. In 1997 she made her breakthrough as the maid Neide Aparecida in the sitcom Sai de Baixo, but left the series in 2000 after getting pregnant with her daughter.

After a one-year break, she returned to television in 2001, acting in series such as Brava Gente and telenovelas such as Desejos de Mulher and Sete Pecados. In 2004 she debuted as a film actress on Xuxa Meneghel's Xuxa e o Tesouro da Cidade Perdida; they collaborated again on 2006's Xuxa Gêmeas. In 2010 she was diagnosed with ovarian cancer, but continued to act until 2017, when her health worsened.

Cabrita's final role prior to her death was in the telenovela Novo Mundo, as the wife of José Bonifácio de Andrada, Narcisa Emília O'Leary. With her health further declining, she was forced to leave the telenovela, but was scheduled to return to its final episode. This, however, never happened; she died on 10 November 2017, aged 53.

== Personal life ==
From 2000 until their divorce in 2004 Cabrita was married to psychoanalyst Ricardo Parente, with whom she had a daughter, Manuela.

== Filmography ==
=== Television ===
Year	Title	Role
1990	Delegacia de Mulheres	
1992	As Noivas de Copacabana	Adelaide
1993–95	Os Trapalhões	Various characters
1997–2000, 2013	Sai de Baixo	Neide Aparecida
2001	Brava Gente	Donária
2002	Desejos de Mulher	Juvelina
2003	Sítio do Picapau Amarelo	Dulce
2005	Sob Nova Direção	Dora
2005	Sítio do Picapau Amarelo	Estelita
2006	Sítio do Picapau Amarelo	Cacá (Cuca)

=== Film ===
Year	Title	Role
1991	I Don't Want to Talk About It Now	Fátima
