= Coração Alado =

- Genre: Telenovela
- Created by: Janete Clair
- Directed by: Roberto Talma
- Starring: Tarcísio Meira; Aracy Balabanian; Walmor Chagas; Débora Duarte; Vera Fischer; Jardel Filho; Joana Fomm; Ney Latorraca; Carlos Vereza; Nívea Maria; Armando Bógus
- Opening theme: "Noturno" by Fagner
- Country of origin: Brazil
- Original language: Portuguese
- No. of episodes: 185

Production
- Running time: 50 minutes

Original release
- Network: TV Globo
- Release: 11 August 1980 – 14 March 1981

Related
- Água Viva; Baila Comigo

Coração Alado (stylized as ❤ Alado) is a Brazilian telenovela produced and broadcast by TV Globo. It premiered on 11 August 1980 and ended on 14 March 1981, with a total of 185 episodes. It's the twenty fifth "novela das oito" to be aired on the timeslot. It is created and written by Janete Clair and directed by Roberto Talma.

== Cast ==
Actor	Character
Tarcísio Meira	Juca Pitanga
Débora Duarte	Camila Karany (Catucha)
Vera Fischer	Vívian Ribas
Walmor Chagas	Alberto Karany
Aracy Balabanian	Maria Faz Favor
Jardel Filho	Tássio Von Strauss
Bárbara Fazio	Silvana Karany
Leonardo Villar	Marcelo França
Joana Fomm	Melissa Ribas Serrano
Ney Latorraca	Leandro Serrano
Nívea Maria	Roberta Karany
Carlos Vereza	Gabriel Pitanga
Armando Bógus	Jorge Gamela
Eva Todor	Hortência Alencar
Otávio Augusto	Fábio Caldas
Tetê Medina	Crystal Camerino
Jonas Mello	Rômulo Pitanga
Carlos Augusto Strazzer	Piero Camerino
Myrian Rios	Alexandra Karany
Mário Cardoso	Alberto Karany Jr.
Jacyra Silva	Léa
Milton Moraes	Ângelo Salvatti
Yara Salles	Dalva Pitanga
Marcelo Picchi	Cláudio
Maria Zilda	Glória França (Glorinha)
Paulo Figueiredo	Anselmo Pitanga
Lisa Vieira	Ieda Caldas
Clementino Kelé	José
Chica Xavier	Carmem
Yolanda Cardoso	Nina
Tony Ferreira	Jaime Caldas
André Valli	Delegado Alexandre
Maria Helena Velasco	Elza Pitanga
Lajar Muzuris	Joel
Sônia Clara	Luciana Ravel
Roberto Faissal	Cacau Durães
Germano Filho	Padre Washington
Monique Lafond	Danúbia
Diogo Vilela	Gerson
Simone Carvalho	Aldeneide Pitanga
Carlos Wilson	Abelardo
Cidinha Milan	Tereza
Tarcísio Filho	Carlinhos
Cissa Guimarães	Carla
Oberdan Júnior	Milton
Izabella Bicalho	Márcia
