= O Astro (1977 TV series) =

Brazilian telenovela

- Genre: Telenovela
- Created by: Janete Clair
- Directed by: Daniel Filho; Gonzaga Blota
- Starring: Francisco Cuoco; Dina Sfat; Tony Ramos; Elizabeth Savalla; Tereza Rachel; Rubens de Falco; Dionísio Azevedo; Edwin Luisi; Carlos Eduardo Dolabella; Eloísa Mafalda
- Opening theme: Bijuterias by João Bosco
- Country of origin: Brazil
- Original language: Portuguese
- No. of episodes: 185

Production
- Running time: 50 minutes
- Production company: Sistema Globo de Novelas

Original release
- Network: Rede Globo
- Release: 6 December 1977 – 7 July 1978

Related
- O Astro (2011)

O Astro is a Brazilian telenovela produced and broadcast by TV Globo. It premiered on 6 December 1977 and ended on 7 July 1978, with a total of 185 episodes. It's the twentieth "novela das oito" to be aired on the timeslot. It is created and written by Janete Clair and directed by Daniel Filho and Gonzaga Blota.

== Cast ==
Actor	Character
Francisco Cuoco	Herculano Quintanilha
Dina Sfat	Amanda Mello Assumpção
Elizabeth Savalla	Lili (Lilian Paranhos)
Tony Ramos	Márcio Hayalla
Tereza Rachel	Clô (Clotilde Hayalla)
Dionísio Azevedo	Salomão Hayalla
Rubens de Falco	Samir Hayalla
Carlos Eduardo Dolabella	Natal (Natalício Valença)
Stepan Nercessian	Alan Quintanilha
Flávio Migliaccio	Neco (Nestor da Silva)
Ângela Leal	Laurinha (Laura Paranhos da Silva)
Edwin Luisi	Felipe Cerqueira
Eloísa Mafalda	Consolação Paranhos
Ida Gomes	Tia Magda
Heloísa Helena	Beatriz
Sílvia Salgado	Jôse (Joselina Mello Assumpção Hayalla)
Hélio Ary	Mello Assumpção (Agenor Mello Assumpção)
Macedo Neto	Amin Hayalla
Marilena Cury	Nadja Hayalla
Isaac Bardavid	Youssef Hayalla
Leda Borba	Jamile Hayalla
Telma Elita	Myrian Lambert Mello Assumpção
Ênio Santos	Dr. Pirilo Cerqueira
Marília Barbosa	Mara Célia
Cleyde Blota	Doralice
Paulo Gonçalves	Inspetor Malvino
Paulo Ascenção	Paulinho
Rejane Marques	Luísa
Tony Ferreira	Gilberto
José Luiz Rodi	Henri
Edson Silva	Almeidinha
Maria Sílvia	Tânia
Juan Daniel	Seu Dondinho
Maria Helena Velasco	Valéria
Mira Palheta	Sílvia
Luiz Macedo	Zeca
César Augusto	Joaquim
Cecília Loyola	Nilza
Aguinaldo Rocha	Dr. Jandir
Carlos Poyart	Nequinho
Michele Bulos	Michele
Newton Martins	Chief of police
Nestor de Montemar	Father Laurindo
José Maria Monteiro	Hayalla's butler
Zilda Pereira	Carmem
