= Dionísio Azevedo =

Brazilian actor and director

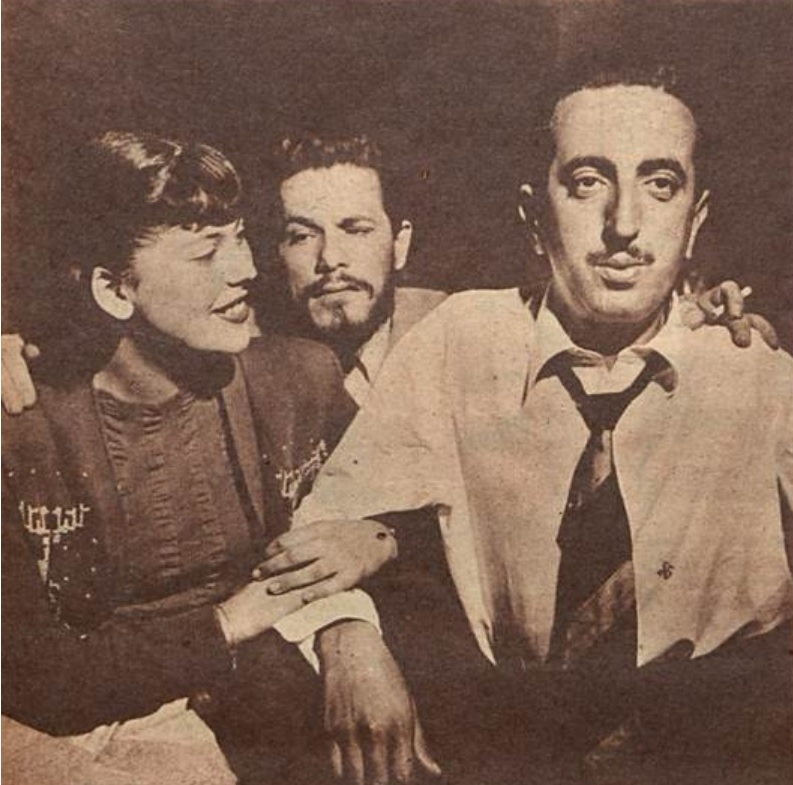
- The artists Vida Alves, Dionísio Azevedo, and Homero Silva on the set of "Quase no Céu" (1948), by Oduvaldo Vianna.
- Born: Taufic Jacob; 4 April 1922; Conceição da Aparecida, Minas Gerais, Brazil
- Died: 11 December 1994 (aged 72); Conceição da Aparecida, Minas Gerais, Brazil
- Occupations: Director, actor, writer
- Years active: 1949–1992

Dionísio Azevedo, stage name of Taufic Jacob (4 April 1922 – 11 December 1994) was a Brazilian television, theatre, and film actor, director, and writer.

== Career ==
He started his career as an actor in Rádio Record in 1942. He moved to television, where he was a pioneer, creating TV de Vanguarda, a television theater popular in the 1950s. He directed several telenovelas, including Os Humildes, which is considered the first to address Brazilian themes, and Ambição, the first diary telenovela of the country. In cinema he acted in about 40 films. In 1989, he won the Gramado Film Festival Jury Award for his role on the film A Marvada Carne.

== Partial filmography ==
- Quase no Céu (1949)
- Corações na Sombra (1951) - (voice)
- Custa Pouco a Felicidade (1953)
- Mãos Sangrentas (1955) - (voice)
- O Sobrado (1956) - Fandango
- Cidade Ameaçada (1960) - Chief of police
- Estrada do Amor (1960)
- A Moça do Quarto 13 (1960) - (voice)
- Sua Vida Me Pertence (1961, TV Series)
- The First Mass (1961) - Mestre Zuza
- The Fisherman and His Soul (1961)
- O Pagador de Promessas (1962) - Olavo, the Priest
- Lampião, o Rei do Cangaço (1964) - João de Mariano
- O Santo Milagroso (1967) - Padre José
- Corisco, O Diabo Loiro (1969) - Compadre mariano
- Independência ou Morte (1972) - José Bonifácio
- Longo Caminho da Morte (1972) - Coronel Múcio
- Obsessão (1973)
- A Virgem (1973)
- A Pequena Órfã (1973) - Velho Gui
- Sedução (1974)
- O Dia em Que o Santo Pecou (1975) - Delegado
- Kung Fu Contra as Bonecas (1975)
- Bacalhau (1976) - Petrônio
- O Dia das Profissionais (1976)
- A Noite da Fêmeas (1976)
- O Caçador de Esmeraldas (1979) - Padre João Leite
- Verde Vinho (1982) - Alfredo Morais
- Fuscão Preto (1983)
- O Menino Arco-Íris (1983) - Lucena
- A Marvada Carne (1985) - Nhô Totó
- Os Bons Tempos Voltaram (1985) - Argemiro (segment "Primeiro de Abril")
- Kuarup (1989) - D. Anselmo
- Eternidade (1992) - Balteano (final film role)
