= River of Evil =

1963 film

- Directed by: Franz Eichhorn
- Written by: Helmuth M. Backhaus; Franz Eichhorn; Orígenes Lessa
- Produced by: Alfred Bittins; Luiz Severiano Ribeiro; Franz Thierry
- Starring: Barbara Rütting; Harald Leipnitz; Oswaldo Loureiro
- Cinematography: Edgar Eichhorn
- Edited by: Anneliese Artelt
- Music by: Catulo Cearense; Remo Usai
- Production companies: Atlântida Cinematográfica; Piran-Film
- Distributed by: Piran-Film
- Release date: 9 December 1963
- Running time: 86 minutes
- Countries: Brazil; West Germany
- Language: German

River of Evil (German: Und der Amazonas schweigt) is a 1963 Brazilian-West German adventure film directed by Franz Eichhorn and starring Barbara Rütting, Harald Leipnitz and Oswaldo Loureiro. It was shot in Eastmancolor on location on the River Amazon. The film's sets were designed by the art director Alexandre Horvat.

== Synopsis ==
Susanne's father, a celebrated explorer, went missing somewhere on the River Amazon. She hires Pedro, a local of German descent to guide her in her search. However they encounter the villain known as the "Green Napoleon" who ruthlessly exploits the Indigenous people for his rubber plantation.

== Cast ==
- Barbara Rütting as Susanne
- Harald Leipnitz as Pedro
- Oswaldo Loureiro as Green Napoleon
- Cyl Farney as Mario
- Tereza Raquel as Donna Cecilia
- Wilson Grey as The Brute

== Bibliography ==
- Amador, María Luisa & Blanco, Jorge Ayala Cartelera cinematográfica, 1960-1969. Centro Universitario de Estudios Cinematográficos, 1986.
- Boller, Reiner. Wilder Westen made in Germany. Mühlbeyer Filmbuchverlag, 2018.
