= I Don't Want to Talk About It Now =

- Directed by: Mauro Farias
- Written by: Mauro Farias; Melanie Dimantas; Evandro Mesquita
- Starring: Evandro Mesquita; Eliana Fonseca; Marisa Orth; Sílvia Pfeifer; Monique Lafond
- Release date: 1991
- Country: Brazil
- Language: Portuguese

I Don't Want to Talk About It Now (Portuguese: Não quero falar sobre isso agora) is a 1991 Brazilian film directed by Mauro Farias in his directorial debut, with screenplay by Farias, Melanie Dimantas, and Evandro Mesquita.

== Synopsis ==
Daniel O'Neil is an aspiring writer that struggles when Dora, his wealthy girlfriend, gives him a solemn farewell. Along with this, he was expelled from the hotel in Copacabana where he had lived. Daniel goes to live in the small apartment of his best friend Meg, but soon gets them both into trouble when he catches a ride with Macula, a known drug trafficker who ends up getting pursued by the police and asks that Daniel hides two packages of cocaine.

== Cast ==
- Evandro Mesquita as Daniel O'Neil
- Eliana Fonseca as Meg
- Marisa Orth as Bárbara
- Sílvia Pfeifer as Raquel
- Monique Lafond as Dora
- Mikimba as Macula
- Roney Facchini as Farnesi
- Sandro Solviatti as Extraterrestre
- Márcia Cabrita as Fátima
- Gilda Nery as Bárbara's mother
- Paula Faria as millionaire girlfriend
- Débora Olivieri as an English teacher
- Hilton Cobra as Capanga de Macula

== Awards ==
Festival de Gramado

- The film won 4 Kikitos de Ouro at the Festival de Gramado in the following categories: Best Film, Best Actress (both Marisa Orth and Eliana Fonseca), best screenplay, and best soundtrack.
