= Fuscão Preto =

1983 film directed by Jeremias Moreira Filho

- Theatrical release poster
- Directed by: Jeremias Moreira Filho
- Written by: Francisco de Assis
- Produced by: Enzo Barone Filmes
- Starring: Almir Rogério; Xuxa Meneghel; Monique Lafond; Denis Derkian
- Cinematography: Susane Bernard
- Music by: Sérgio Augusto; Cido Bianchi
- Distributed by: União Cinematográfica Brasileira
- Release date: April 18, 1983
- Running time: 98 minutes
- Country: Brazil
- Language: Portuguese

Fuscão Preto (transl. Black Beetle) is a 1983 Brazilian adventure drama film, written Francisco de Assis and directed by Jeremias Moreira Filho. The film is based on the song "Fuscão Preto" by Atílio Versutti and Mariel and sung by Almir Rogério, was filmed in the cities of Mogi Guaçu, Mogi Mirim and Espírito Santo do Pinhal, all country towns in the state of São Paulo, Brazil.

The song, released between 1981 and 1982, enjoyed popularity and reached its peak during this period.

== Synopsis ==
The story revolves around a young girl's love for a car. Set in a rural town, it follows the Mayor's attempt to force his son into marriage with the girl. However, the car, a black Volkswagen Beetle known as "Fuscação Preto," from the title, stands in the way.

== Cast ==
- Almir Rogério as Lima
- Xuxa Meneghel as Diana
- Monique Lafond as Cleide
- Dênis Derkian as Marcelo
- Dionísio Azevedo as Lucena
- Mário Benvenutti as Rui
- Zé Coqueiro
- Dalmo Peres
- Sueli Aoki
- Florinda Lopez
- Jaci Ferreira
- Márcia Cheroto
- Janete Santos
- Mogiano & Mogianinho
- Juarez Fagundes
- Marcos Pontes
- Sérgio Águia Chileno
- Nelson Pereira
- Márcia Aoki
