= Adelaide Chiozzo =

Brazilian actress, accordionist, and singer (1931–2020)

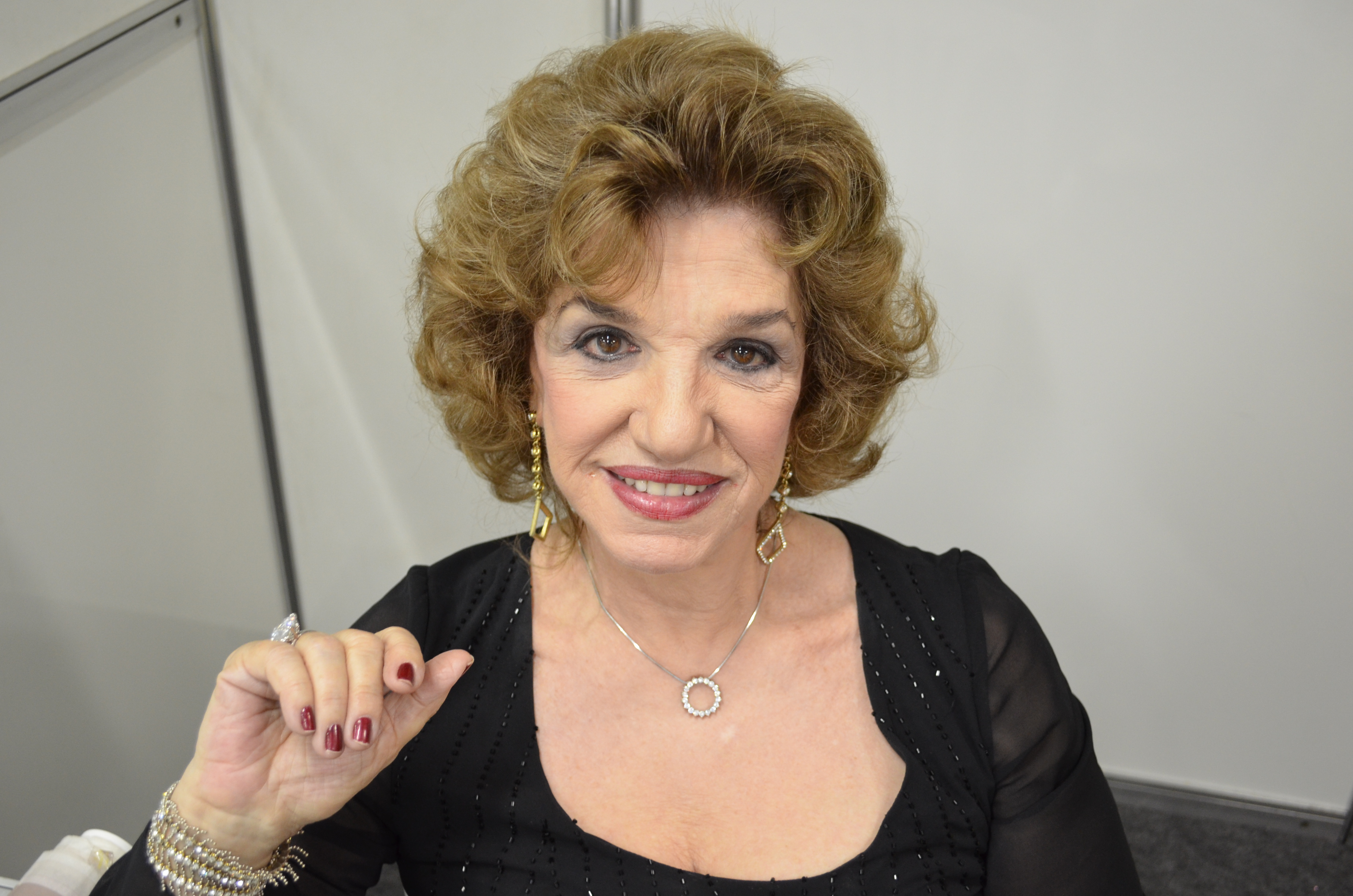
- Born: 8 May 1931; São Paulo, Brazil
- Died: 4 March 2020 (aged 88); Rio de Janeiro, Brazil
- Occupations: Actress and singer
- Years active: 1946–2020

Adelaide Chiozzo (8 May 1931 – 4 March 2020) was a Brazilian actress, accordionist and singer who appeared on the radio and in many chanchada films. She was known for her cover version of songs like "Beijinho Doce" and "Sabiá na Gaiola".

Chiozzo died on 4 March 2020 in a hospital in Rio de Janeiro, after suffering a fall at her home, aged 88.

== Filmography ==
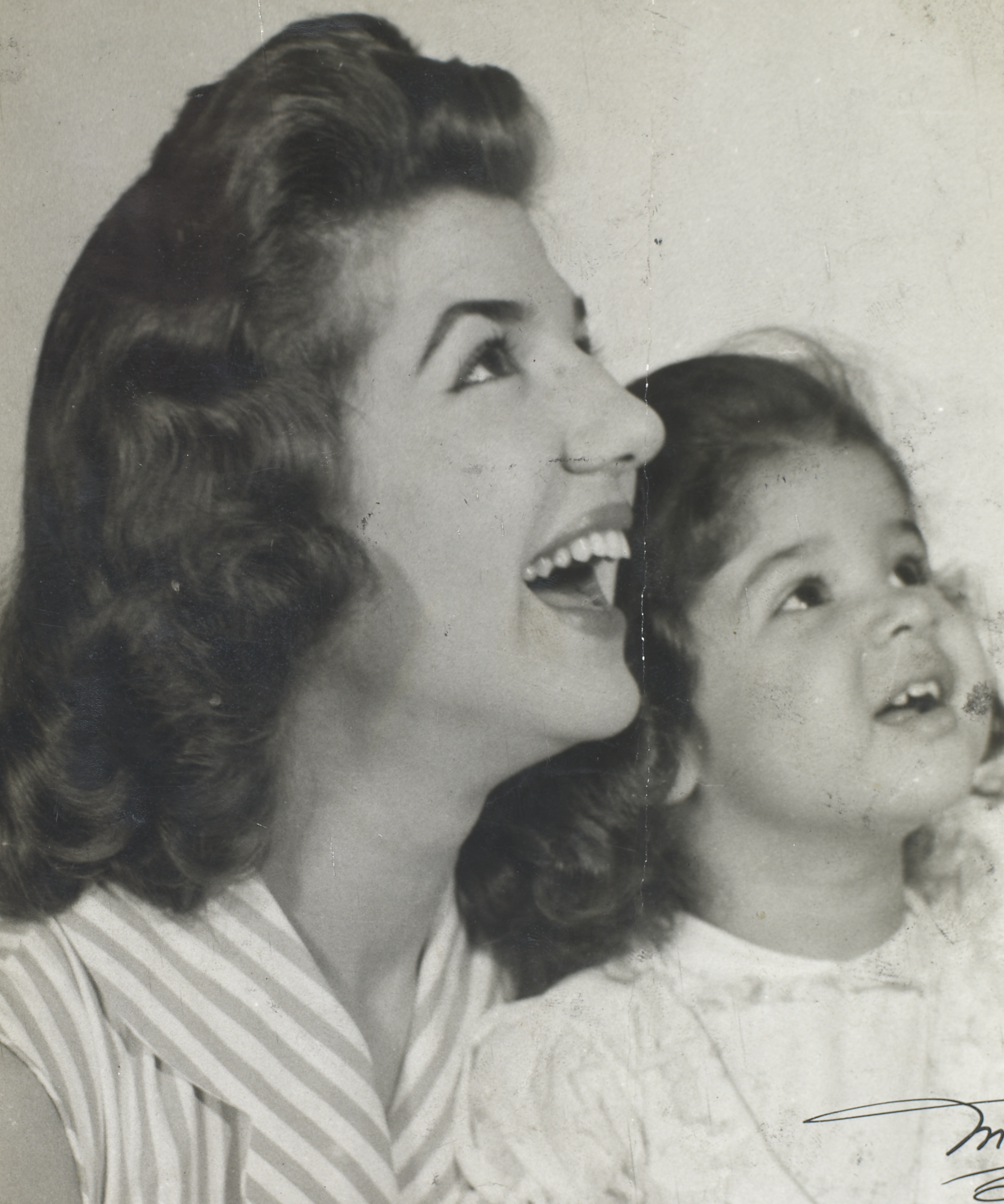
Chiozzo in 1957 with her daughter, Cristina.

=== Film ===
Year	Title	Role	Notes
1946	Segura Esta Mulher		
1947	Esse Mundo É um Pandeiro		
1948	E o Mundo se Diverte		
1948	É Com Esse Que Eu Vou		
1949	Carnaval no Fogo		
1950	Aviso aos navegantes	Adelaide	
1951	Aí Vem o Barão	Iolanda	
1952	É Fogo na Roupa	Diana	
1952	Barnabé, Tu És Meu	Antonieta	
1954	O petróleo é nosso	Marisa	
1954	Malandros em Quarta Dimensão		
1956	Sai de Baixo		
1956	Guerra ao Samba		
1956	Genival É de Morte		
1957	Garotas e Samba	Didi	
1975	Assim Era a Atlântida	Herself	Documentary

=== Television ===
Year	Title	Role	Notes
1979	Feijão Maravilha	Leonor	
1986	Cambalacho	Prince's wife on honeymoon	
1992	Deus Nos Acuda	Jucelina	(final appearance)
