= Sai de Baixo =

- Cover of the first season DVD
- Genre: Sitcom
- Created by: Luís Gustavo; Daniel Filho
- Directed by: Daniel Filho (1996-1997 and 2000); Denis Carvalho (1996-2002 and 2013); José Wilker (1996-2002); Jorge Fernando (2000-2001); Cininha de Paula(2001-2002)
- Starring: Aracy Balabanian; Ary Fontoura; Cláudia Jimenez; Claudia Rodrigues; Ilana Kaplan; Lucas Hornos; Luiz Carlos Tourinho; Luís Gustavo; Márcia Cabrita; Marisa Orth; Miguel Falabella; Tom Cavalcante
- Country of origin: Brazil
- Original language: Portuguese
- No. of seasons: 7
- No. of episodes: 241

Production
- Producer: Eduardo Figueira
- Camera setup: Multi-camera
- Running time: 45 minutes
- Production company: Central Globo de Produção

Original release
- Network: Rede Globo; Canal Viva
- Release: March 31, 1996 – March 31, 2002
- Release: June 11 – July 2, 2013

Related
- Toma Lá, Dá Cá

Sai de Baixo (a Brazilian Portuguese slang roughly translated as "get out of the way") is a Brazilian sitcom that first aired on Rede Globo from 1996 to 2002. It followed the lives of the members of a dysfunctional family, their maid and the doorman of the apartment building in which they lived.

It ran for 7 seasons, from 1996 to 2002, on Sunday nights after the newsmagazine Fantástico. That means that it always aired after 10:00 pm, which was necessary given the show's heavy language and sexual innuendos. In 2000, however, the premiere of a new reality show shifted the program to the 11:30 p.m. slot, which lasted for about four months. After that the timeslot varied almost monthly, which started to hurt ratings. At one time, the show was airing around 12:30 a.m., which is considered the beginning of the "wasteland" of late night programming in Brazilian television, with fewer viewers and, therefore, fewer sponsors. In 2013, Globo's sister cable channel Canal Viva produced a revival of the show with four episodes.

Although some of the characters hailed from the poorer layers of society (such as the maid and the doorman), as well as the richer (albeit impoverished, such as the former socialite), the program derived most of its humor from an acid criticism of the Brazilian middle class, its prejudices and views of the rest of the country and the world. This precept justified the sometimes harsh jokes involving racism, sexism and other politically incorrect notions.

== Format ==
Sai de Baixo emerged as actor Luis Gustavo suggested to director Daniel Filho about doing a sitcom inspired by 1960s Família Trapo, recorded on a theater while following a dysfunctional family.

The show was recorded in front of a live audience in a São Paulo theater, Teatro Procópio Ferreira. The program was shot there every Tuesday afternoon, but the theater was still receiving regular plays and spectacles, and the set had to be disassembled at the end of every shooting and then reassembled the following week, for the next shooting. The people involved in the show called it "the marathon of continuity", since every item of the family's apartment had to be in exactly the same place that it was in the previous episodes. In a further acknowledgment of its surroundings, every episode of the program ended with a curtain call.

The show was rarely set outside its primary location, the living room of an apartment in Arouche Towers, a building in São Paulo's neighborhood Largo do Arouche. The biggest setting change occurred in 2000, when eight episodes were shot in a cafe in the building's ground floor, Arouche's Place. But the change was not well received by the audiences, and poor ratings forced the return of the apartment set. This was done in such a hurry that one of the episodes that took place in the Cafe was dropped and left unaired. Upon the return to the apartment, the writers decided that the Cafe had exploded in unclear circumstances, probably as part of an insurance fraud scheme.

The atmosphere of the show was very different from the usual Americans in the sense that it was extremely informal. The actors often acknowledged the presence of the audience, sometimes even interacting with them. It was also relatively common for the actors to stall a scene because they were having difficulties remembering their lines, started ad libbing others, or started laughing at their coworkers. Bloopers were shown during the credits for the last four seasons.

Only one episode of the show was actually broadcast live: it was the premiere of the third season, in 1998. Since there would be no way to edit out mistakes and exaggerations, the actors were asked to keep improvisation to a minimum, and avoid at all costs curse words. It was treated as a gala event by the network, who invited a VIP audience to it. The story of the episode was created so that the actors could be dressed up during the performance (the characters were to attend a formal event). At the beginning of each segment, the network had reporters interview cast members and VIP guests at a red-carpet-like area in the theater. Other two episodes left the theatre: the New Year's Eve 2000 episode had the cast leaving the stage down to Rua Augusta, and the first episode of 2001 had scenes in Barra da Tijuca, Rio de Janeiro doubling for Miami.

The show had many Brazilian special guests appear, such as actors Danielle Winits, José Wilker and Dercy Gonçalves, singers Rita Lee and Elba Ramalho and entertainer Angélica, among others.

== Characters ==
=== Carlos Augusto "Caco" Antibes ===
(played by Miguel Falabella)

A snotty husband to Magda, he was embarrassed by his wife's stupidity and liked to berate her. Despite that, both were a loving couple, despite the marriage occurring because Cassandra wanted to take advantage of the Antibes' money. Despite being lazy and hating work, Caco liked to spend money, preferably that of other people. Caco was indulgent and egotistical, frequently comparing himself as "a Danish prince", while also hating poor people. Falabella also played Caco's mother, Dona Caca, an equally arrogant woman from Minas Gerais with a heavy caipira accent.

Falabella had a tradition to ad lib, and even at times acknowledge he was forgetting the script. Frequent themes included phoney English sentences, stories on how pathetic the lifestyle of the poor is, and hazing Cassandra, at times with allusions to Aracy Balabanian's career.

In the revival, it is explained that Caco spent 11 years in a Danish prison before being deported.

Catchphrases: "Cala a boca, Magda !" (Shut up, Magda!) / "Eu tenho horror a pobre!" (I hate poor people!) / "Sou quase um príncipe Dinamarquês" (I'm almost a Danish prince!) / "Vamos fazer o Canguru Perneta!" (Let's do the "one-legged Kangaroo"!) / "Sai fora, cabeção dos infernos!!" (Get outta here, giant head from hell! — spoken to Cassandra whenever he was fed up with her) / Vai, toma teu rumo (Go, walk to your way - spoken to Ribamar) / "Surucucu de cabelo laquêado" (Bushmaster with laker hairs - spoken to Cassandra)

=== Magda Salão Antibes ===
(Played by Marisa Orth)

The lustful and stupid wife of Caco. The character was marked by an abysmal ignorance and complete lack of connection with reality, with frequent malapropisms and nonsensical behaviour. Magda and Caco also had a heightened sexual appetite, with their favorite sexual position being one they called the "one-legged Kangaroo".

In 1998, during the third season, Marisa Orth got pregnant, and the producers decided to write her pregnancy within the show. During Orth's maternity leave, Magda's absence was explained with her going to a clinic in order to have the baby away from the craziness of the family.

In the revival, Magda declares that after being deported from Denmark as Caco remained in prison, she lived for eleven years in Congonhas Airport because she did not know that could leave.

Catchphrase: "Num tô intendendu..." (I don't get it—misspoken) / "Caquinhooo!".

=== Caquinho ===
(played by Lucas Hornos/Rafael Canedo (2019 movie)

Magda and Caco's son, originating from Marisa Orth's pregnancy. Originally portrayed by an animatronic baby which Falabella liked to mock, eventually it was changed to a child actor, 8-year old Lucas Hornos. The sudden aging of the character was not explained aside from the characters doing eight birthday parties in a row so as to not confuse Magda.

The new child character, however, created trouble with the Brazilian Child Protection Justice, which thought that the heavy, sexually charged dialogue of the show was not suited for a child to participate, since the boy would have to participate at the "level" of the others. Finally, a judge ruled that the child could not participate in the program (which was consistent with the ban established by the network itself that kept children from being in the audience). The producers made a radical decision: the character was eliminated after only a few episodes, with the excuse of being sent to a boarding school, from whence he never returned, nor was ever mentioned again.

The doll and Hornos combined gave Caco Jr. a run of a little over one full season.

=== Wanderley "Vavá" Mathias ===
(Played by Luís Gustavo)

The owner of the apartment, a business man with various companies - at first, travel agency Vavatur. His life changes when his sister Cassandra, his niece Magda and her husband, Caco, move in with him. He was forced to take the family in because his sister reveals that the deed to the apartment, which had been inherited by Vavá, was actually splitting the property 50% with her. He and Aracy Balabanian were the only cast members to have appeared in every episode of the show.

Like Gustavo, Vavá was shown as a fan of the São Paulo FC, with the character's entrance beginning in November 2000 being accompanied by the first lines of the club's anthem. Falabella replied by having Caco's entrance punctuated by the anthem of his team, CR Vasco da Gama.

In the revival, Vavá explains that spent the previous 11 years in an Amazon rainforest expedition.

Catchphrase: "Aqui, Farroupilha!" (a made-up insult, could be translated as "no way, Jose").

=== Cassandra Mathias Salão ===
(Played by Aracy Balabanian)

A decadent socialite, who decides to move in with her brother Vavá along with daughter Magda and son-in-law Caco once she found out that her recently deceased brigadier husband had left her no pension. She hated her son-in-law Caco despite introducing him to Magda, but was as resentful as he when it came to her present financial situation, being capable of reproachable actions if it meant that she could make some money out of it.

The actress's particular hairdo inspired a recurrent joke about the amounts of lacquer that her character would use. Falabella constantly teased her about it, as well as her dresses, and a supposed lewd behavior.

Starting in 2000, Cassandra's entrance was punctuated with Edward Elgar's "Pomp and Circumstance".

The revival had Cassandra returning to Arouche after 11 years living with a cheapskate aunt who treated her like a maid.

Catchphrase: "Já pra cozinha!" (To the kitchen, now! — spoken to the maid whenever she got angry at her, usually followed by the name of the maid, which varied throughout the show)

=== Ribamar ===
(played by Tom Cavalcante)

The pesky doorman, an immigrant from Ceará. He frequently wore National Hockey League jerseys, in a parody of the hip hop wear. Ribamar dated Edileuza and Neide, with Caco expressing his disgust to the idea of "poor people procreating".

In 1999, amidst fights with the writers and other members of the cast, Tom Cavalcante left the show in mid-season. Scripts already written reassigned Ribamar's scenes to other characters of the cast, and later gave the position of doorman of the apartment building by a recently introduced new character, Ataíde.

Catchphrases: "É ripa na chulipa!" (a common Brazilian phrase, meaning something like "it's on!") / "Magoei..." (something like "My feeling are hurt", said when someone scolded him, and usually followed by a sad face expression commonly known in Brazil as beicinho)

=== Pereira ===
(played by Ary Fontoura)

A cheapskate executive who became infatuated with Cassandra Salão. The character was introduced in 2000, as the owner of the Cafe at the ground floor of the apartment building. He only lasted one season as Fontoura did not renew his contract to work in Porto dos Milagres.

=== Ataíde ===
(played by Luiz Carlos Tourinho)

Originally the lackey of Pereira who liked to fawn over his boss, eventually he became Arouche Tower's doorman. Ataíde was often mocked for both his height and virginity, solved as he started dating Sirene.

=== The Maids ===
The maids were a chapter aside in the history of the show. The original idea called for there to be one maid working at the apartment. This concept was never abandoned by the writers, who, despite all the problems, insisted on having a maid as part of the ensemble.

In Brazil, it was common for middle class families to be able to afford the help of a maid full-time. This employee will sometimes even sleep at the job, and that was the excuse of the maid of the show to be present in the apartment at all times. The presence of this character was in keeping with Brazilian social structures. Furthermore, all of the characters received names that would be considered "typical of a maid" in the Brazilian middle class imaginary. This could be considered as a certain bias in the show, but it was fully acceptable because its bulk material came from an acid criticism of the Brazilian middle class culture (and how this segment of Brazilian society views the rest of the country and the world).

Four different actresses had the job throughout the show, due to several problems and complications. What follows is a list of them all, in chronological order of participation.

==== Edileuza ====
(played by Cláudia Jimenez)

Edileuza was the maid for the show's first season. The character was sassy, often speaking her mind freely to her direct employer, Vavá, and telling the others to their faces how much she disliked them. Whenever she got fired by one of the family members (which was rather frequent), she would respond that they could not fire her, since Vavá was the one who paid her salary and thus had the authority to dismiss her. There would be no repercussions to those "dismissal attempts", which many argue to have been possible because of the show's little commitment to reality. Although the character dated the doorman Ribamar, Jimenez had a strong chemistry with Falabella, who played Caco, and funny, sexual innuendos between the two were common, as well as the exchange of insults between the characters, as Edileuza would rebuke Caco for his dishonesty and he would tease her for being poor and a maid.

Jimenez left the show in 1997 after a huge fight with show runner Cláudio Paiva.

Catchphrase: "Ah, meu Deus!" (Oh my God! — spoken with dismay and often at the telephone, with the audience having no idea of what she would be hearing from the other side) / "Dona Casseta" (Mra. Casseta - spoken to Cassandra)

==== Lucinete ====
(played by Ilana Kaplan)

Kaplan was chosen to play the maid Lucinete and replace Edileuza after Jimenez's departure in 1997. Despite working on four episodes, the character was considered so out of sync with the rest of the cast that the decision was made to discard her only two days after the first episode with Kaplan had aired. The character's departure was never explained (as it was common when radical changes were made in the show).

==== Neide Aparecida ====
(played by Márcia Cabrita)

A heavily sexualized and at times ignorant maid, introduced in 1997. While at first Neide dated Ribamar, once the doorman left, the writers gave Neide a fiancé, a macho Army sergeant who was nicknamed "Mangalarga" (played by Ernani Moraes). Mangalarga was dropped once Neide discovered he was already married.

In October 2000, it was announced that Cabrita was pregnant and that her character would be temporarily replaced. The maid's pregnancy was written in as it could not be disguised, but never fully explained.

Neide was the catalyzer for 2013 revival, using a fortune gained by suing former bosses due to the new rights provided by a Constitutional amendment regarding maid rights to buy the Arouche apartment and bring back Vavá and his family. Eventually Caco swindles her out of the apartment's possession.

Actress Márcia Cabrita died in 2017.

==== Sirene ====
(played by Cláudia Rodrigues)

The fourth and final maid of the show, Cirene was a spitfire short woman which in reply to Caco's stories about the poor would start complaining about rich people. She dated Ataíde.

Every time she entered, a Brazilian northeast jingle would play, stopping only when ordered by Cirene herself. A running gag in those occasions was the brief repetition of the music when Cirene started to walk, frequently making her scold the sound operator.

== Hiatus and cancellation ==
In 2001, the show returned for a sixth season reportedly because of a petition drive by fans, who gathered signatures and managed to avoid cancellation. Ratings, however, were unstable at best, and Globo TV was facing fierce competition from a reality show produced by the second largest network in the country and its principal competitor, SBT. Palliative measures, such as the remodelling of the family's apartment, which became more modern and with more vibrant colors, were insufficient to rekindle the public's interest in the show.

The general understanding was that the formula had been worn out and that the show was out of new ideas and had been for sometime. Most believed that it should have been cancelled in 2000, after the end of its fifth season, which had been considered rather faulty.

In September 2001 the show was put on hiatus for two months, while reality show No Limite was broadcast in its timeslot. The sixth season was wrapped then, and speculations had it that the show would not return. In late December, however, the network decided to produce a final, shorter seventh season, which ran from late December until March 2002 (the last episode aired on March 31, exactly six years after the first episode).

== Revival ==
In 2013, Globo's sister channel Canal Viva decided to produce a four episode revival, with the return of the core family of Caco, Magda, Vavá and Cassandra, and the longest serving maid, Neide. The episodes were again recorded at Procópio Ferreira under Dennis Carvalho, this time written by Artur Xexeo. It was explained that characters spent eleven years away from Arouche, being summoned together by their former maid Neide Aparecida once she bought the Arouche apartment. Guests included Tony Ramos in the first episode, Ingrid Guimarães in the second and Arlete Salles in the third.
