= Tony Ferreira (actor) =

Brazilian actor (1943–1994)

- Born: Antonio Ferreira Pinto Filho; 20 February 1943; Florianópolis
- Died: 12 October 1994 (aged 51); Rio de Janeiro
- Occupation: Actor

Tony Ferreira (Florianópolis, 1943 — Rio de Janeiro, 1994), was a Brazilian actor, who died of sepsis in 1994, aged 51.

== Filmography ==
=== Telenovelas ===
- 1988 Olho por Olho (Rede Manchete) - Secretary of Justice
- 1987 Mandala
- 1985 Um Sonho a Mais - Afonso
- 1984 Partido Alto - Sheriff
- 1984 Anjo Maldito (SBT) - Tomás
- 1982 Final Feliz - Gastão
- 1981 Baila Comigo - Edmundo
- 1980 Coração Alado - Jaime
- 1980 Água Viva - Waldir
- 1978 Sinal de Alerta - Father Mauro
- 1977 O Astro - Gilberto
- 1977 Sem Lenço, Sem Documento - Gouveia
- 1976 Estúpido Cupido - Fidélis
- 1975 O Grito - Grandalhão
- 1975 Escalada - Bruno
- 1974 Fogo Sobre Terra
- 1973 Cavalo de Aço
- 1972 Selva de Pedra - Sheriff

=== Miniseries ===
- Planeta dos Homens
- 1991 O Portador
- 1990 La Mamma - Luigi Vampa
- 1987 A Rainha da Vida (Rede Manchete) - Lawyer

=== Films ===
- 1984 - Amor Maldito
- 1980 - O Grande Palhaço
- 1979 - Inquietações de Uma Mulher Casada
- 1979 - Milagre - O Poder da Fé
- 1977 - Noite em Chamas
- 1977 - O Seminarista
- 1976 - As Mulheres que Dão Certo
- 1976 - Xica da Silva
- 1976 - O Ibraim do Subúrbio
- 1976 - O Monstro de Santa Teresa

=== Theatre (incomplete list) ===
- Ópera do Malandro
- Mame-o ou Deixe-o
- Cabaret S.A.
