= Tereza Rachel =

Brazilian actress

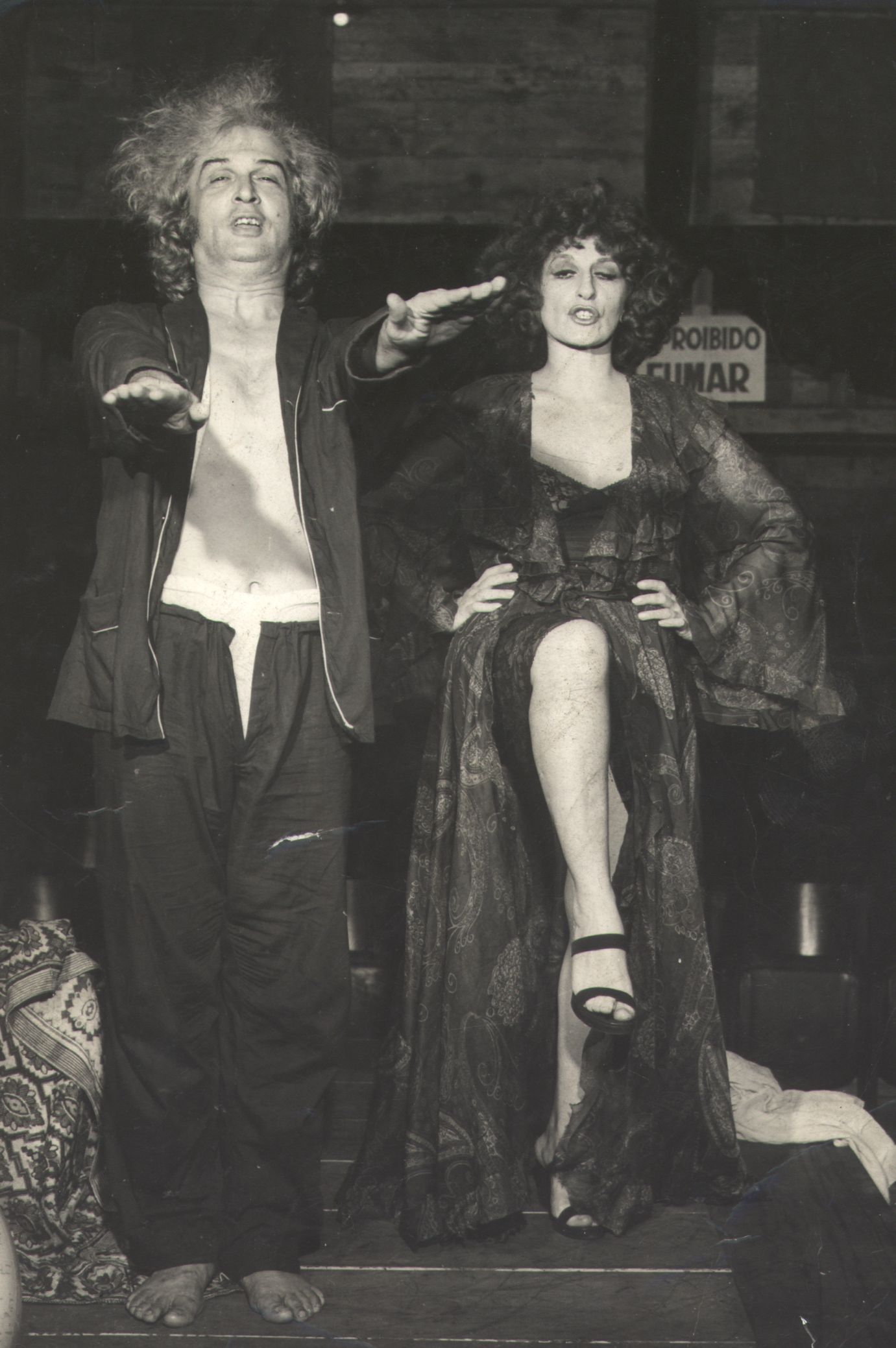
A picture of Tereza Rachel

Tereza Rachel (10 March 1934 - 2 April 2016) was a Brazilian actress.

== Biography ==
Born in Nilópolis, in the Baixada Fluminense, the actress began her career in 1955, performing in theater, being directed by Henriette Morineau in Aurimar Rocha's The Elegant. The following year she received the prize for actress revelation of the Brazilian Association of Theater Critics, ABCT, for her performance in Prima Donna.

== Filmography ==
=== Films ===
Year	Title	Role
1956	Genival É de Morte	
1963	Ganga Zumba	
1963	Sol sobre a Lama	
1963	River of Evil	Donna Cecília
1964	Procura-se uma Rosa	
1965	Canalha em Crise	
1973	Amante Muito Louca	Brigite
1976	Feminino Plural	
1977	Revólver de Brinquedo	Catarina
1978	A Volta do Filho Pródigo	Cléo
1984	Águia na Cabeça	Dona Branca
1985	Pedro Mico	Aparecida

=== Television ===
Year	Title	Role
1958	O Jovem Dr. Ricardo	Lena
1966	A Pequena Karen	Francis
1970	A Mansão dos Vampiros	Rochele
1974	O Rebu	Lupe
1975	O Grito	Débora Saldanha Mendonça
1977	O Astro	Clô Hayala
1979	Marron Glacê	Lola
1981	Baila Comigo	Marta Frey Gama
1982	Paraíso	Aurora
1982	Sítio do Picapau Amarelo	Evil Queen
1983	Louco Amor	Renata Dumont (Agetilde Rocha)
1988	Abolição	Princess Isabel
1988	Bebê a Bordo	Eva Mendonça
1989	Que Rei Sou Eu?	Rainha Valentine
1989	República	Princess Isabel
1995	A Próxima Vítima	Francesca Ferreto de Angelis Rossi
1998	Era uma Vez...	Berta
1998	Você Decide	(episode: Sindrome)
1999	Você Decide	Álvara (episode: Madame Sussu)
2008	Alice	Elvira Cipriani
2009	Caras & Bocas	Rebeca
2010	A Vida Alheia	Isa Müller (ep: Manchas do Passado)
