= A Volta do Filho Pródigo =

1978 film directed by Ipojuca Ponte

- Directed by: Ipojuca Pontes
- Written by: Zevi Ghivelder; Ipojuca Pontes
- Cinematography: Roland Henze
- Edited by: Manoel de Oliveira
- Distributed by: Embrafilme
- Release date: January 25, 1979 (Brazil)
- Running time: 97 minutes
- Country: Brazil
- Language: Portuguese

A Volta do Filho Pródigo is a 1978 Brazilian film directed by Ipojuca Pontes.

== Cast ==
- Helber Rangel ... Antônio Maria
- Dilma Lóes ... Rita
- Marlene ... Antônio's Mother
- Jaime Barcellos ... Macedo, the taylor
- Dinorah Brillanti ... Belmira
- B. de Paiva ... Ceará
- Jota Diniz ... Twenty-One
- José Dumont ... The Unemployed
- Carlos Gregório ... Boss's Son
- Adalberto Nunes ... Sebastião, Antônio's friend
- Tereza Rachel ... Cléa, Antônio's lover

== Awards ==
1979: Gramado Film Festival

1. Best Actor (Helber Rangel) (won)
2. Best Supporting Actress (Dilma Lóes) (won)
3. Best Film (Nominee)

1981: São Paulo Association of Art Critics Awards

1. Best Film (won)
2. Best Actor (Helber Rangel) (won)
3. Best Actress (Dilma Lóes
4. Best Supporting Actress (Tereza Raquel) (won)
5. Best Director (Ipojuca Pontes) (won)
