= Melanie Dimantas =

Brazilian screenwriter

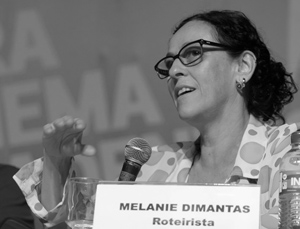
- Melanie Dimantas
- Born: April 22, 1958 (age 68); São Paulo, Brazil
- Occupation: Screenwriter
- Years active: 1991–present
- Notable work: Não Quero Falar Sobre Isso Agora (1991); Carlota Joaquina: Princesa do Brasil (1995); O Outro Lado da Rua (2004); Olhos Azuis (2009); Meu Pé de Laranja Lima (2012)

Melanie Dimantas (born April 22, 1958) is a Brazilian screenwriter from the city of São Paulo. Dimantas is known for co-authoring the Brazilian movie Carlota Joaquina: Princess of Brazil (1995), with the filmmaker Carla Camurati.

== Career ==
In the year of 1980, Dimantas graduated in social sciences by the University of São Paulo (USP). At the same time, she graduated as a history and geography teacher, in the same university.

Melanie Dimantas is known for the script of the movie "I Don't Want to Talk About It Now" (1991), written with Maurício Farias and Evandro Mesquita. This movie won the prize of best script in the Gramado Film Festival, the most important festival of cinema in Brazil. Also, she is co-author of the movies "The Other Side of the Street" (2004), "My Sweet Orange Tree" (2012) and has collaborated in several episodes of the famous Brazilian TV Show "City of Men" (2002 - 2005).

Besides the work as a screenwriter, Dimantas also teaches screenwriting in the Pontifical Catholic University (PUC-Rio), in the course of Social Communication - Cinema.

== Personal life ==
Melanie Dimantas has three children with her ex-husband Mauro Farias: Paulo [b. 1985], Helena [b. 1988] and Raquel [b.1993].

== Awards and nominations ==
Gramado Film Festival

- 1991 - (Won) Best Screenplay for "I Don't Want Talk About it Now" (1991), shared with Maurício Farias and Evandro Mesquita

ACIE Award, Brazil

- 2005 - (Won) Best Screenplay for "The Other Side of the Street" (2004), shared with Marcos Bernstein
- 2009 - (Nominated) Best Screenplay for "Camila Jam" (2007), shared with: Elena Soarez and Murilo Salles
- 2011 - (Nominated) Best Screenplay for "Blue Eyes" (2009), shared with: Paulo Halm

Cinema Brazil Grand Prize

- 2005 - (Nominated) Best Original Screenplay for "The Other Side of the Street" (2004), shared with Marcos Bernstein
- 2007 - (Nominated) Best Adapted Screenplay for "Irma Vap: o retorno" (2006), shared with Adriana Falcão and Carla Camurati
- 2009 - (Nominated) Best Adapted Screenplay for "Camila Jam" (2007), shared with: Elena Soarez and Murilo Salles
- 2011 - (Nominated) Best Original Screenplay for "Blue Eyes" (2009), shared with: Paulo Halm
- 2014 - (Nominated) Best Adapted Screenplay for "My Sweet Orange Tree" (2012), shared with: Marcos Bernstein

Paulínia Film Festival

- 2011 - (Won) Best Screenplay for "Blue Eyes" (2009), shared with: Paulo Halm
