= Gerson Brenner =

Brazilian actor and model (1959–2026)

- Born: Gerson dos Santos Oliveira; 22 December 1959; São Paulo, São Paulo, Brazil
- Died: 23 March 2026 (aged 66); São Paulo, São Paulo, Brazil
- Occupations: Actor; model
- Years active: 1982–1998

Gérson dos Santos Oliveira (22 December 1959 – 23 March 2026), known by the stage name Gerson Brenner, was a Brazilian actor and model. He became notable in the 1990s, acting in several TV Globo telenovelas and programs.

His career was cut short in 1998 when he was the victim of a robbery and shot in the head, suffering serious consequences for the rest of his life.

Brenner died from multiple organ failure in São Paulo, on 23 March 2026, at the age of 66.

== Filmography ==
Year	Title	Character	Note	Channel
1998	O Milionário e o Vagabundo	Feirante	Telefilm	Rede Globo
1998	Corpo Dourado	Jorge Camargo (Jorginho)		Rede Globo
1997	Por Amor e Ódio	Ricardo		RecordTV
1997	O Olho da Terra	Nuno de Castro		RecordTV
1996	Vira Lata	Amadeu		Rede Globo
1995	Tocaia Grande	Pedro Cigano		Manchete
1993	Olho no Olho	Guto Zapata		Rede Globo
1993	Radical Chic	Macho	Special participation	Rede Globo
1993	Você Decide	Delegado	Episode "A Sangue Frio"	Rede Globo
1992	Os Trapalhões	Black	Special participation	Rede Globo
1992	Deus Nos Acuda	Gerson Geovanni		Rede Globo
1992	Perigosas Peruas	Giovanni Barbiere		Rede Globo
1991	Alô, Doçura!	Justino		SBT
1990	Lua Cheia de Amor	Cláudio		Globo
1990	Rainha da Sucata	Gerson Geovanni		Globo
1989	Top Model	Cordeiro de Deus		Globo
1989	Kananga do Japão	Dr. Marcelo		Manchete
1982	Final Feliz	Opening scenes		Rede Globo

=== Cinema ===
Year	Title	Character
1997	Navalha na Carne	Cafetão

=== Stage ===
Year	Title
1990	Três Solteironas Balançando o Rambo
1989	1789, o Ano da Revolução
1988	Querelle
