= Que Rei Sou Eu? =

- Genre: Telenovela
- Created by: Cassiano Gabus Mendes
- Directed by: Jorge Fernando
- Starring: Edson Celulari; Giulia Gam; Tato Gabus Mendes; Antônio Abujamra; Cláudia Abreu; Tereza Rachel; Daniel Filho; Marieta Severo; Natália do Vale; Jorge Dória
- Opening theme: "Rap do Rei" - Luni
- Country of origin: Brazil
- Original language: Portuguese
- No. of episodes: 185

Production
- Running time: 60 minutes

Original release
- Network: TV Globo
- Release: 13 February – 15 September 1989

Que Rei Sou Eu? (English: What King Am I?) is a 1989 Brazilian telenovela created by Cassiano Gabus Mendes. It stars Edson Celulari and Giulia Gam in the lead roles.

== Cast ==
- Edson Celulari as Jean-Pierre
- Giulia Gam as Aline
- Tato Gabus Mendes as Pichot / Lucien Élan / Rei Petrus III
- Tereza Rachel as Rainha Valentine de Avillan
- Antônio Abujamra as Mestre Ravengar
- Natália do Vale as Suzanne Webert
- Cláudia Abreu as Princesa Juliette de Avillan
- Daniel Filho as Bergeron Bouchet / André Barral
- Marieta Severo as Madeleine Bouchet
- Jorge Dória as Vanolli Berval
- Aracy Balabanian as Maria Fromet / Lenoir Gaillard
- Stênio Garcia as Corcoran
- Ítala Nandi as Loulou Lion
- Edney Giovenazzi as François Gaillard
- Carlos Augusto Strazzer as Crespy Aubriet
- Zilka Salaberry as Gaby
- Fábio Sabag as Roger Webert
- John Herbert as Bidet Lambert
- Vera Holtz as Fanny
- Oswaldo Loureiro as Gaston Marny
- Laerte Morrone as Gérard Laugier
- Ísis de Oliveira as Lucy Laugier
- Mila Moreira as Zmirá
- Marcelo Picchi as Michel, o Marquês de Lafitti
- Betty Gofman as Princesa Ingrid
- Guilherme Leme as Roland Barral
- Cristina Prochaska as Charlotte
- Paulo César Grande as Bertrand
- Cinira Camargo as Lily
- Carla Daniel as Cozette
- Marcos Breda as Pimpim
- Yolanda Cardoso as Miruska
- Ivan Setta as Godard
- Heloísa Helena as Cocote
- Luiz Magnelli as Arauto Arnúbio
- Desireé Vignolli as Denise
- José Carlos Sanches as Balesteros
- Totia Meireles as Monah
- Soraya Ravenle as Anete
- Cacá Barrete as Vadi
- Melise Maia as Janine
- Ítalo Rossi as Marqês de Castilha
