= Juan Daniel Ferrer =

- Born: 20 February 1907; Barcelona, Catalonia, Spain
- Died: 27 October 2008 (aged 101); Rio de Janeiro, Brazil
- Occupations: Actor and singer
- Spouse: Mary Daniel
- Relatives: Daniel Filho (son)

Juan Daniel Ferrer (February 20, 1907 – October 27, 2008) was a Spanish-Brazilian actor and singer.

== Biography ==
Joan was born in Barcelona, Spain. His family emigrated to Argentina when he was a child. Later, in 1929, he settled in Brazil, where he married Argentine actress Mary Daniel, with whom he had two children, the Brazilian actor and director Daniel Filho and Cláudia Daniel.

== Career ==
He was a producer on José Bonifácio de Oliveira Sobrinho's team on TV Tupi and later on TV Globo, where he participated in telenovelas such as O Bem-Amado (1973), Selva de Pedra (1972), O Casarão and O Gato Comeu (1985).

In the cinema he appeared in O Casal (1975) and Xuxa e Os Trapalhões in O Mistério de Robin Hood (1990).

== Death ==
He died on October 27, 2008, at age 101, due to kidney failure.
