= Oswaldo Loureiro =

Brazilian actor (1932–2018)

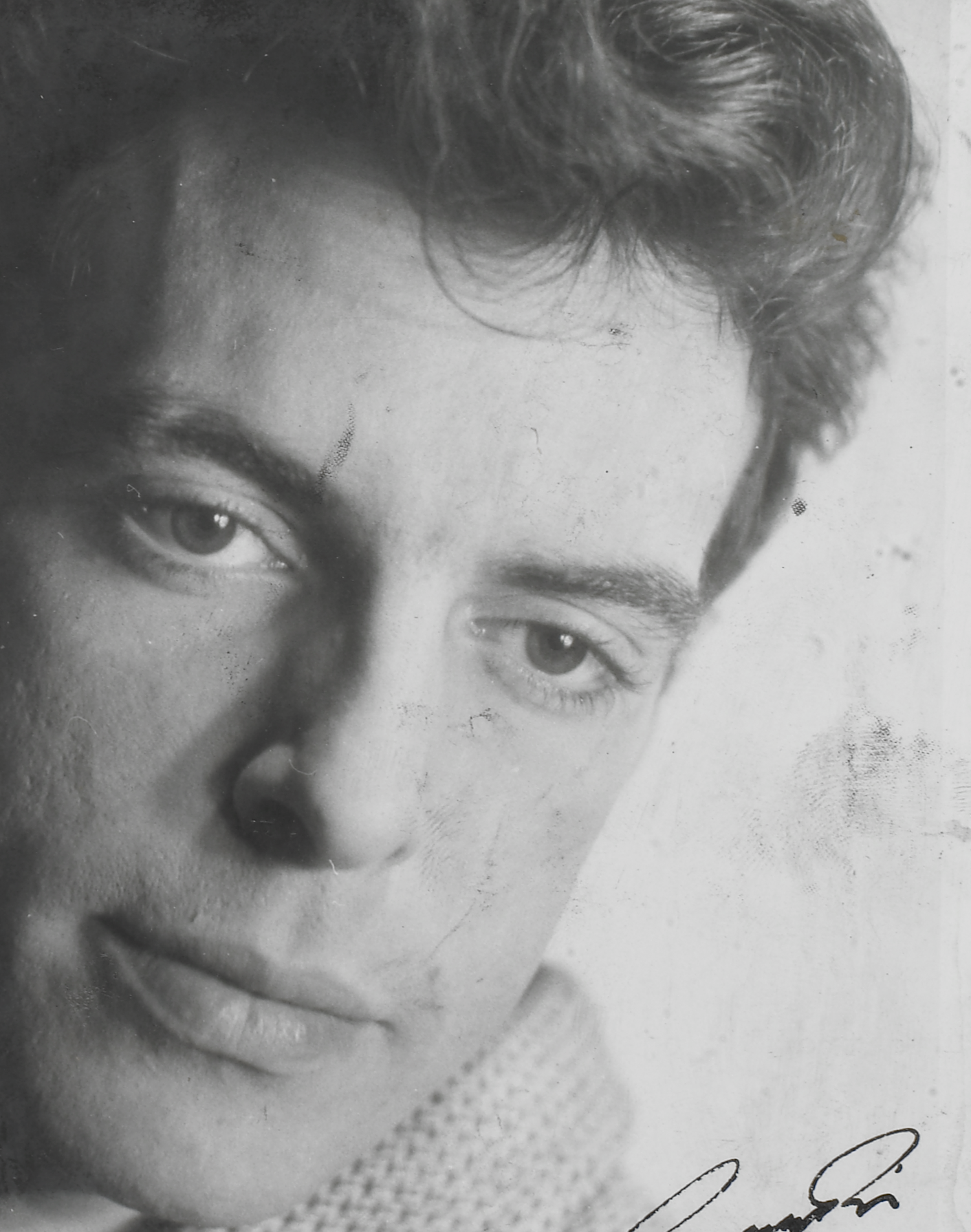
- An image of Oswaldo Loureiro
- Born: 23 July 1932; Rio de Janeiro, Brazil
- Died: 3 February 2018 (aged 85); São Paulo, Brazil
- Occupation: Actor
- Years active: 1944-2011

Oswaldo Loureiro (23 July 1932 – 3 February 2018) was a Brazilian actor. Loureiro began his career as a child actor in the 1940s before moving on to adult roles.

Loureiro was born in Rio de Janeiro. He died in São Paulo on 3 February 2018 at the age of 85.

== Partial filmography ==
- É Proibido Sonhar (1944)
- Romance Proibido (1944)
- O Brasileiro João de Souza (1944) - Young Mário
- Asas do Brasil (1947)
- Minas Conspiracy (1948)
- Um Caso de Polícia (1959)
- O 5º Poder (1962) - Carlos
- Sonhando com Milhões (1963) - Guimarães
- The Beggars (1963)
- River of Evil (1963) - Green Napoleon
- Um Morto ao Telefone (1964) - Marcelo
- A Morte em Três Tempos (1964)
- Engraçadinha Depois dos Trinta (1966) - Luís Cláudio
- Uma Rosa para Todos (1967) - Nino
- Mineirinho Vivo ou Morto (1967) - Dr. Geraldo
- O Homem Nu (1968) - Ludovico
- Máscara da Traição (1969)
- The Heirs (1969) - Barros
- As Confissões de Frei Abóbora (1971)
- Um Brasileiro Chamado Rosaflor (1976)
- O Sol dos Amantes (1979)
- Bonitinha, mas Ordinária (1981)
- Beijo no Asfalto (1981) - Cunha
- Bar Esperança (1983) - Baby
- Parahyba Mulher Macho (1983)
- Atrapalhando a Suate (1983)
- Para Viver um Grande Amor (1984)
- Sexo Frágil (1986)
- Rádio Pirata (1987) - Werner
- Leila Diniz (1987) - Alfredo Buzaid
- Sonho de Verão (1990) - Oswaldo
- O Fim do Mundo (1996, TV Series) - Romildo Galvão
- Simão, o Fantasma Trapalhão (1998) - Hiram

== Bibliography ==
- Marsh, Leslie. Brazilian Women's Filmmaking: From Dictatorship to Democracy. University of Illinois Press, 2012.
