= The Fifth Power (film) =

Brazilian film

- Film poster
- Directed by: Alberto Pieralisi
- Written by: Carlos Pedregal
- Produced by: Carlos Pedregal
- Starring: Eva Wilma, Oswaldo Loureiro
- Cinematography: Özen Sermet
- Edited by: Ismar Porto
- Music by: Remo Usai
- Distributed by: Pedregal Filmes
- Release date: 1 January 1962
- Running time: 99 minutes
- Country: Brazil
- Language: Portuguese

The Fifth Power (Portuguese: O 5º Poder) is a 1962 Brazilian science fiction thriller film directed by Alberto Pieralisi, and written and produced by Carlos Pedregal. It tells the story of foreign agents who wish to take control of Brazil's natural resources by transmitting subliminal messages to convince the population to overthrow its government, and it is considered one of the first serious Brazilian science fiction films. The film is notable for coming two years before a military coup.

== Plot ==
A team of foreign agents arrive in Brazil and discuss an international plot to take control of the country's natural resources. They begin by installing devices on the country's main radio and TV transmitters. The devices are designed to emit subliminal messages geared towards changing the populace into a pliable and aggressive mob supporting a revolution.

Journalist Carlos, who is out of the country on assignment when the messages begin, and his friend Laura, who does not listen to the radio or watch television, are unaffected by the broadcasts and both soon realize that something has gone wrong in the country. They begin an investigation and uncover the plot by the agents.

== Cast ==
- Eva Wilma - Laura Leal
- Oswaldo Loureiro - Carlos
- Sebastião Vasconcelos - Milton
- Joana Fomm

== Production ==
Carlos Pedregal traveled from Spain to Argentina, his mother's birthplace, and from there received a temporary visa to work in Brazil as a journalist starting in 1947. He then introduced the concept of subliminal advertising in Brazil, and began hosting a program called Revelations of the Subconscious for Rádio Globo in 1951. Later that year, he began hosting a television show dedicated to psychological experiments on Tupi Network; he launched a second television show in 1958. In 1961, Pedregal revealed he was working on the screenplay for what would become The Fifth Power. Seeking to emulate the methods of Companhia Cinematográfica Vera Cruz, which hired foreigners for technical roles in order to produce films of an international quality level, Pedregal hired Italian director Alberto Pieralisi (who had lived in Brazil for a number of years, but had previously worked for Cines and Cinecittà in Italy) and Turkish cinematographer Özen Sermet.

The film, which was set in Rio de Janeiro and featured scenes set on the Sugarloaf Cable Car and at the Christ the Redeemer statue, was at the time the most expensive film made in Brazil. Along with Garrincha: Hero of the Jungle, the film was selected to represent Brazil at the 13th Berlin International Film Festival.

Around the time of the film's release, its negatives and most copies were destroyed in a fire. It was considered lost for decades, until one copy of the negatives was discovered in Berlin. The film was screened at the Festival de Brasília in 2006, with Pedregal in attendance to introduce it.

== Reception ==
Contemporary reviews were positive. O Estado de S. Paulo wrote in a review that "the suspenseful, thrilling atmosphere recalls SF works by William Cameron Menzies and Edgar G. Ulmer. Rio de Janeiro has never featured so beautifully in the cinema." In regards to the novelty of its science fiction elements, Diário de Notícias wrote that the "terrible weapon of subjugation of collective behavior, capable of directing the subconscious of people under its influence..." "has at its mercy unwitting and unconscious accomplices of a campaign without precedents or limits." The film won the Saci Prize for Best Editing (1964) and the Governor of the State of São Paulo Award for Best Screenplay (1964).

After the film's 2006 screening, Luiz Zanin wrote that it has "rare cinematic virtues" and "very sophisticated" camera work. He also said the fight at the Christ the Redeemer was "breathtaking," and noted, "I don't know if today a film director would be able to direct a scene like this." Paulo Teixeira wrote that it is "a gem" and "a rare and excellent Brazilian thriller." He continued, "In fact, this grand finale in Christ the Redeemer is a masterpiece of editing and photography, a masterpiece of suspense and tension," and noted that the battle on the Sugarloaf cable car preceded and surpassed the similar sequence in Moonraker. Teixeira also commented on the film's prescience, describing how it came two years before the 1964 Brazilian coup d'état. Cléber Eduardo wrote after the screening that it was one of the highlights of the festival, and described its similarities to John Carpenter's They Live. Lucas Zoppa labeled the film one of the ten best Latin American sci-fi movies of all time.

Vice said that the film was "very Brazilian in its approach to violence. The disturbances unleashed by the subliminal messages began with a fight between fans at Maracanã, right after a goal by Pelé. True headlines, almost all taken from the lurid tabloid Fight for Democracy, set the tone for the spiral of madness that overwhelmed the population. Generous close-ups on the front pages of newspapers placed viewers in the face of suicides, rapes, crimes of passion and misshapen corpses. Added to the individual tragedies were explicit references to massacres, the case of the Gran Circo Norte-Americano, a riot in the Guanabara State Penitentiary and thewave of popular withdrawals that shook Duque de Caxias in 1962."
