= Vai Trabalhar, Vagabundo! =

1973 film directed by Hugo Carvana

Vai Trabalhar Vagabundo
- Directed by: Hugo Carvana
- Written by: Hugo Carvana; Armando Costa
- Starring: Hugo Carvana; Odete Lara; Paulo César Peréio
- Cinematography: José Medeiros
- Edited by: Nazareth Ohana
- Release date: 1973
- Running time: 80 min
- Country: Brazil
- Language: Portuguese

Vai Trabalhar, Vagabundo! is a 1973 Brazilian film directed and starring by Hugo Carvana.

== Cast ==
- Hugo Carvana - Secundino Meireles
- Odete Lara - Heloísa
- Paulo César Peréio - Russo
- Nelson Xavier - Babalu
- Rose Lacreta - Vitória
- Roberto Maya - Azambuja

== Awards ==
Gramado Film Festival

1. Best Pictures

Taormina International Film Festival

1. Best First Film
2. Golden Charybdis (Hugo Carvana) (Nominee)

Instituto Nacional de Cinema

1. Coruja de Ouro Award
