= Baila Comigo =

- Genre: Telenovela
- Created by: Manoel Carlos
- Directed by: Roberto Talma
- Starring: Tony Ramos; Lilian Lemmertz; Raul Cortez; Betty Faria; Natália do Vale; Lídia Brondi; Fernando Torres; Tereza Rachel; Fernanda Montenegro; Carlos Zara; Reginaldo Faria
- Opening theme: "Baila Comigo" by Robson Jorge and Lincoln Olivetti
- Country of origin: Brazil
- Original language: Portuguese
- No. of episodes: 167

Production
- Running time: 50 minutes
- Production company: Central Globo de Produção

Original release
- Network: Rede Globo
- Release: 16 March – 25 September 1981

Baila Comigo is a Brazilian telenovela produced and broadcast by Rede Globo. It premiered on 16 March 1981 and ended on 25 September 1981, with a total of 162 episodes. It's the twenty sixth "novela das oito" to be aired on the timeslot. It is created and written by Manoel Carlos and directed by Roberto Talma.

== Cast ==
| Actor | Character |
|---|---|
| Tony Ramos | Joaquim Seixas Miranda (Quinzinho) |
| Tony Ramos | João Victor Gama |
| Lilian Lemmertz | Helena Seixas Miranda |
| Raul Cortez | Joaquim Gama (Quim) |
| Lídia Brondi | Mira (Semíramis Maia) |
| Fernando Torres | Plínio Miranda |
| Tereza Rachel | Marta Tereza Frey Gama |
| Reginaldo Faria | Dr. Saulo Martins |
| Susana Vieira | Paula Vargas Leme |
| Natália do Vale | Lúcia Toledo Fernandes Miranda |
| Carlos Zara | Caio Fernandes |
| Fernanda Montenegro | Sílvia Toledo |
| Cláudio Cavalcanti | Guilherme Fonseca |
| Christiane Torloni | Lia Seixas Miranda |
| Lauro Corona | Carlos Eduardo Maia (Caê) |
| Arlete Salles | Dolores Moreira |
| Betty Faria | Joana Lobato |
| Gilberto Martinho | Antenor Gomide |
| Beatriz Lyra | Letícia Maia Rodrigues |
| Milton Gonçalves | Otto Rodrigues |
| Otávio Augusto | Mauro Vargas Leme |
| Suely Franco | Rosa França |
| Jonas Mello | Álvaro França |
| Maria Helena Pader | Zuleika Gomes |
| Fernanda Torres | Fauna França |
| Carlos Gregório | Sandro Moreira |
| Beth Goulart | Débora Frey Gama Maia |
| Lady Francisco | Ondina de Moraes |
| Miriam Pires | Cândida Martins |
| Tony Ferreira | Edmundo |
| Alcione Mazzeo | Laura (Laurinha) |
| Fábio Pillar | Marcelo Vargas Leme |
| Narjara Turetta | Flora França |
| Jorge Botelho | Gerson Martins |
| Teresinha Sodré | Corina |
