= Conceição da Aparecida =

Coordinates: 21°06′S 46°12′W

- Municipality
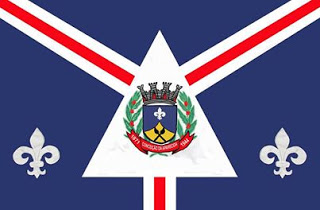
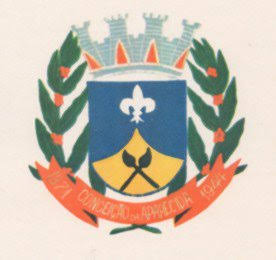
- Flag Coat of arms
- Interactive map of Conceição da Aparecida
- Country: Brazil
- Region: Southeast
- State: Minas Gerais
- Mesoregion: Sud/Sudoeste de Minas

Population (2020)
  - Total: 10,322
- Time zone: UTC−3 (BRT)

Conceição da Aparecida is a municipality in the state of Minas Gerais in the Southeast region of Brazil.

== See also ==
- List of municipalities in Minas Gerais
