= Jorge Dória =

Brazilian actor and humorist

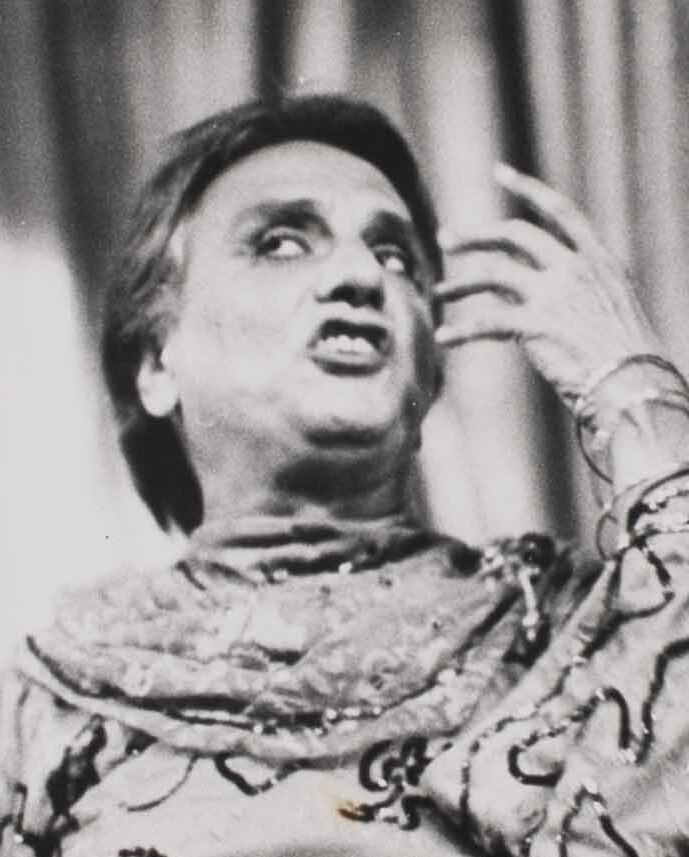
- Born: Jorge Pires Ferreira; 12 December 1920; Rio de Janeiro, Brazil
- Died: 6 November 2013 (aged 92); Rio de Janeiro, Brazil
- Occupation(s): Actor, humorist
- Years active: 1942-2005

Jorge Pires Ferreira (12 December 1920 – 6 November 2013), known professionally as Jorge Dória, was a Brazilian actor and humorist. In 1962 he was awarded with Prêmio Saci.

== Partial filmography ==
- Mãe (1948)
- Minas Conspiracy (1948)
- Também Somos Irmãos (1949) - Walter Mendes
- Maior Que o Ódio (1951)
- Sonho de Outono (1955)
- O Assalto ao Trem Pagador (1962) - Delegado
- Os Vencidos (1963)
- Crime no Sacopã (1963)
- Procura-se uma Rosa (1964)
- Asfalto Selvagem (1964) - Dr. Bergamini
- O Beijo (1965) - Mário Ribeiro
- História de um Crápula (1965)
- Paraíba, Vida e Morte de um Bandido (1966)
- O Mundo Alegre de Helô (1967) - Fafá
- Juventude e Ternura (1968) - Jaine
- Viver de Morrer (1969)
- As duas faces da moeda (1969)
- Pais Quadrados... Filhos Avançados (1970)
- Minha Namorada (1970)
- É Simonal (1970)
- Os Devassos (1971)
- O Pecado de Marta (1971)
- O Doce Esporte do Sexo (1971)
- Bonga, O Vagabundo (1971) - Ricardo's father
- Eu Transo, Ela Transa (1972) - Roberto
- Como É Boa Nossa Empregada (1973) - Dr. Renato ("Naná"- segment "Melhor da festa, O)
- Um Varão Entre as Mulheres (1974)
- Oh Que Delícia de Patrão (1974) - Dr. Felipe / Severino Riba / Dr. André
- O Comprador de Fazendas (1974)
- Com as Calças na Mão (1975) - Pai de Reg
- Um Soutien Para Papai (1975)
- As Secretárias... Que Fazem de Tudo (1975)
- As Aventuras de Um Detetive Português (1975) - Neiva
- Ninguém Segura Essas Mulheres (1976) - Túlio (segment "Marido Que Volta Deve Avisar")
- Lady on the Bus (1978)
- Os melhores Momentos da Pornochanchada (1978)
- Assim Era a Pornochanchada (1978)
- Teu Tua (1979) - (segment "Um Homem Debaixo da Cama")
- Perdoa-me Por Me Traíres (1980) - Doctor
- Crônica à Beira do Rio (1980) - Cronista
- O Seqüestro (1981) - Marcondes
- Pedro Mico (1985)
- The Lady from the Shanghai Cinema (1988) - Velho
- Que Rei Sou Eu? (1989, TV Series) - Vanoli Berval
- Rainha da Sucata (1990, TV Series) - Alberico
- Meu Bem, Meu Mal (1990, TV Series) - Emílio Castro
- O Lado Escuro do Coração (1992) - Librero
- Deus nos Acuda (1992, TV Series) - Tomás Euclides
- Olho no Olho (1993, TV Series) - Atila
- Quatro por Quatro (1994, TV Series) - Santinho
- Traição (1998) - Reinaldo (Dagmar's father)
- The Man of the Year (2003) - Dr. Carvalho (final film role)
