= Aracy Balabanian =

Brazilian actress (1940–2023)

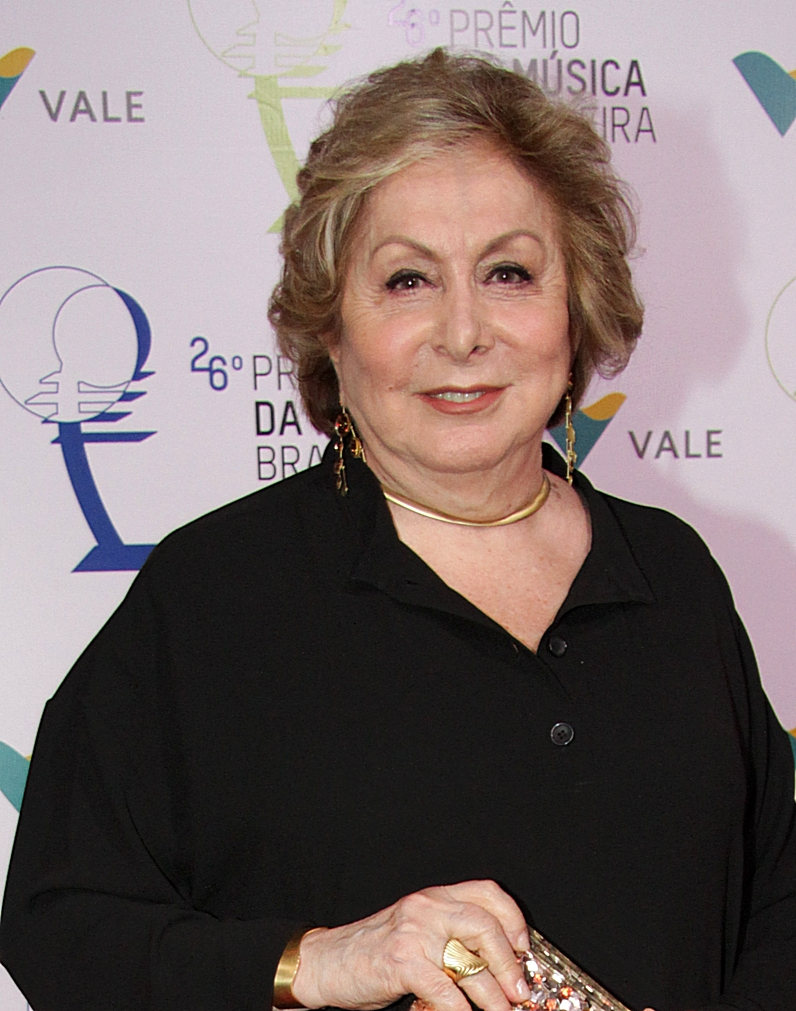
- Balabanian in 2015
- Born: 22 February 1940; Campo Grande, Mato Grosso, Brazil (present-day Campo Grande, Mato Grosso do Sul, Brazil)
- Died: 7 August 2023 (aged 83); Rio de Janeiro, Rio de Janeiro, Brazil
- Occupation: Actress
- Years active: 1963–2023

Aracy Balabanian (Armenian: Արասի Բալաբանյան; 22 February 1940 – 7 August 2023) was a Brazilian actress of Armenian descent. With a career spanning more than six decades, she was one of the longest serving and most prominent actresses in the history of Brazilian theatre and television. She was particularly known for her work in comedy and television drama, as well as for her memorable character Dona Armênia in the telenovelas Rainha da Sucata (1990) and Deus nos Acuda (1992–1993). Balabanian also became widely known for playing Cassandra in the comedy series Sai de Baixo.

== Biography ==
Aracy Balabanian was born in Campo Grande, in the state of Mato Grosso do Sul, Brazil, to Armenian immigrants Raphael and Esther Balabanyan, who fled Nor Hachn and settled in Brazil after surviving the Armenian genocide perpetrated by the Ottoman Turks.

Her parents originally wanted to name her Arax (Արաքս), after the river, but ultimately decided to honor their new homeland instead. Aracy is a Brazilian name of Tupi origin meaning "daybreak" or, literally, "mother of the day."

At the age of fifteen, she moved to São Paulo with her parents and helped raise her seven younger brothers. She passed the entrance exam for Social Sciences and for the Escola de Arte Dramática, coming to abandon the studies of Sociology, another entrance exam that she had taken and had been accepted, to devote herself to the theater. She said that she lived in a time when it was considered ugly for a woman to do theater since women were formerly educated to be housewives and obey their husbands.

Balabanian died in Rio de Janeiro on 7 August 2023, at the age of 83.

== Filmography ==
=== Television series ===
- Vila Sésamo (1972–1974).... Gabriela
- Aplauso (1979).... Angélica
- Caso Especial (1993–1994)
- Você Decide (1994)
- Engraçadinha... Seus Amores e Seus Pecados (1995).... Dona Geninha
- Sai de Baixo (1996—2013).... Cassandra Mathias Salão
- Brava Gente (2001)
- Linha Direta Justiça (2003)
- Casos e Acasos (2008).... Amélia
- Queridos Amigos (2008).... Teresa Fernandes Moretti
- Toma Lá, Dá Cá (2008).... Shafika Sarakutian
- Louco por Elas (2012).... Cândida
- Juntos a magia acontece (2019)

=== Telenovelas ===
- Marcados Pelo Amor (1964)
- O Amor Tem Cara de Mulher (1966)
- Um Rosto Perdido (1966)
- Angústia de Amar (1967)
- Meu Filho, Minha Vida (1967)
- Sublime Amor (1967)
- Antônio Maria (1968)
- Nino, o Italianinho (1969)
- A Fábrica (1971).... Isabel
- O Primeiro Amor (1972)
- Corrida do Ouro (1974)
- Bravo! (1975)
- O Casarão (1976)
- Locomotivas (1977).... Miena Cabral
- Pecado Rasgado (1978)
- Coração Alado (1980).... Maria Faz-Favor
- Brilhante (1981)
- Elas Por Elas (1982)
- Guerra dos Sexos (1983)
- Transas e Caretas (1984)
- Ti Ti Ti (1985)
- Mania de Querer (1986)
- Helena (1987)
- Que Rei Sou Eu? (1989).... Maria Fromet/Lenore Gaillard
- Rainha da Sucata (1990).... Dona Armênia (Arakel Tchobanian Giovani)
- Felicidade (1991)
- Deus Nos Acuda (1992).... Dona Armênia (Arakel Tchobanian Giovani)
- Pátria Minha (1994)
- A Próxima Vítima (1995).... Filomena Ferreto
- Sabor da Paixão (2002)
- Da Cor do Pecado (2004)
- A Lua Me Disse (2005)
- Eterna Magia (2007)
- Passione (2010).... Gemma Mattoli
- Cheias de Charme (2012)
- Saramandaia (2013).... Dona Pupu (Eponina Camargo)
- Geração Brasil (2014)
- Ligações Perigosas (2016)
- Sol Nascente (2016)
- Pega Pega (2017)
- Malhação: Vidas Brasileiras (2018)

=== Cinema ===
- A Primeira Viagem .... Irene (1975)
- Caramujo-Flor .... Woman in black (1998)
- Policarpo Quaresma, Herói do Brasil .... Maricota (1998)

== Theatre ==
- 1963 – Os Ossos do Barão
- 1966 – Oh, Que Delícia de Guerra
- 1968 – Feira Paulista de Opinião
- 1969 – Hair
- 1977 – Brecht, segundo Brecht
- 1980 – À Direita do Presidente
- 1985 – Boa Noite, Mãe
- 1985 – Time and the Conways
- 1988 – Folias no Box
- 1991 – Fulaninha e Dona Coisa
- 1995 – Noite Feliz
- 1998 – Clarice, Coração Selvagem
- 2006 – Comendo Entre as Refeições

== Awards and nominations ==
=== APCA Awards ===
Year	Category	Nominee / work	Result
1995	Best Performance by an Actress in Television	A Próxima Vítima	Won

=== Best of the Year – Globe Awards ===
Year	Category	Nominee / work	Result
1995	Best Actress in a Telenovela	A Próxima Vítima	Won
2018	Mário Lago Trophy	—N/a	Won

=== Contigo! Awards ===
Year	Category	Nominee / work	Result
2003	Best Comedy Actress – Television	Sabor da Paixão	Nominated

=== Press Trophy ===
Year	Category	Nominee / work	Result
1967	Outstanding Performance by an Actress in a Telenovela	O Amor Tem Cara de Mulher	Nominated
1968	Outstanding Performance by an Actress in a Telenovela	Meu Filho Minha Vida	Nominated
1969	Outstanding Performance by an Actress in a Telenovela	Antônio Maria	Nominated
1990	Outstanding Performance by an Actress in a Telenovela	Rainha da Sucata	Nominated
1996	Outstanding Performance by an Actress in a Telenovela	A Próxima Vítima	Won

=== Quem Awards ===
Year	Category	Nominee / work	Result
2010	Best Supporting Actress – Television	Passione	Nominated

== See also ==
- Brazilian cinema
- Brazilian television
- Telenovela
- Armenians in Brazil
- Armenian diaspora
- Armenian genocide
