= Rainha da Sucata =

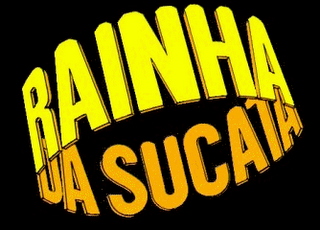
- Genre: Telenovela; Romantic comedy
- Created by: Silvio de Abreu
- Starring: Regina Duarte; Glória Menezes; Tony Ramos; Daniel Filho; Renata Sorrah; Raul Cortez; Aracy Balabanian
- Country of origin: Brazil
- Original language: Portuguese
- No. of episodes: 179

Production
- Running time: 50 minutes
- Production company: Central Globo de Produção

Original release
- Network: Rede Globo
- Release: 2 April – 26 October 1990

Rainha da Sucata (Portuguese for Queen of Scrap) is a Brazilian telenovela that first aired on TV Globo from 2 April to 26 October 1990, in 179 episodes.

== Production ==
Rainha da Sucata was the first telenovela written by Silvio de Abreu for Globo's 8 p.m. primetime slot; until then he had authored several plots presented at 7 p.m. He was assigned to write a humorous telenovela as, at the time, there was a determination by Globo's Teledrama Department to avoid presenting overly dramatic plots in the slot, a practice that began with the airing of O Salvador da Pátria (1989). However, this proposal prevailed only at the beginning of the plot: due to the rejection of the excessive comedic tone by the public (a factor noted in focus groups), from June 1990 onwards, De Abreu decided to put comedy in the background and focus more on drama.

Also in June, the airings began to show longer episodes with the goal of reducing the impact that the telenovela Pantanal, aired by competitor Rede Manchete, had on later programs. This movement caused Pantanal to lose advertisements as it started to be aired later and later as a reaction. In addition, the "scenes from the next episode" segment shown at the end of each episode was removed.

Economic reforms implemented by then President Fernando Collor de Mello with his Collor Plan were incorporated into the story of Rainha da Sucata. Globo has been accused of knowing Collor's intentions and not warning the population of such plan, but in reality many scenes that were already ready for airing had to be rewritten to adapt to the new reality, as the government plan caused deep economic and social impacts.

In the middle of the plot, Silvio de Abreu had to get away from work and Gilberto Braga replaced him, having written 9 episodes.

The villain Laurinha Figueroa had her outcome 8 episodes before the end of the telenovela. In Episode 171, aired on 17 October 1990, she commits suicide by throwing herself from a building, but the mystery of her death is one of the leading threads of the final line of the plot. Three different endings were written in order to keep the secret about the destiny of the main character Maria do Carmo.

== Plot ==
Set in São Paulo, the plot of Rainha da Sucata portrays the universe of the new rich and the decadent São Paulo elite contrasting two female characters, the emerging Maria do Carmo Pereira (Regina Duarte) and the failed socialite Laurinha Albuquerque Figueroa (Gloria Menezes). Maria do Carmo gets rich from her father's business, the junkyard salesman Onofre (Lima Duarte), and becomes a successful businesswoman, but keeps the habits of her humble past. She lives with her father and mother, Neiva (Nicette Bruno), in the Santana neighborhood of northern São Paulo.

In love with Edu Figueroa (Tony Ramos) a good life that had despised and humiliated her in her youth, she decides to “buy it”: she proposes to marry him to help his family, traditionally but on the verge of bankruptcy. Edu accepts the proposal, and the emerging, after marriage, will live in the Figueroa mansion, in the Jardins, sophisticated city stronghold. In the new house, Maria do Carmo begins to live a nightmare because of Laurinha. Married to Betinho (Paulo Gracindo), Edu's father, the socialite is obsessed with her stepson and goes out of her way to conquer him, and will not leave the "junk" Maria do Carmo in peace.

In addition to Laurinha's bad marriage and persecution, the businesswoman begins to see her business go wrong because of administrator Renato Maia (Daniel Filho), whom she fully trusted. Renato, in fact, is a corrupt man who puts a blow to Maria do Carmo. The executive marries Mariana (Renata Sorrah), a fragile and wealthy woman who suffers from threats from her husband, who only married her out of interest in her fortune. Mariana is the sister of Caio (Antonio Fagundes), a stuttering paleontologist who is torn between the bride, the fiery Nicinha (Marisa Orth), and the cabaret dancer, Adriana Ross (Cláudia Raia), who is the daughter of villain Laurinha Figueroa.

The plot was also marked by Dona Armênia (Aracy Balabanian), Armenian who has lived in Brazil for years with her children Gera (Marcello Novaes), Gino (Jandir Ferrari) and Gerson (Gerson Brenner), who treats as if they were babies. Gerson, by the way, is Maria do Carmo's right-hand man in the company, with whom she gets involved early in the plot. The three brothers will later dispute the love of young Ingrid (Andrea Beltrão), daughter of the exquisite Mrs. Isabelle (Cleyde Yáconis). In the middle of the plot, Dona Armênia discovers shady business between her late husband and Maria do Carmo's father and owns the territory where Maria do Carmo's company is built, a building in the middle of Paulista Avenue and decides to demolish the building. Your phrase "I'm going to put this building on chon!" marked the plot and the character. Instead she takes Maria do Carmo's company that picks up scrap metal on the street again. However, as soon as Maria do Carmo recovers with the discovery that Caio and Mariana were her siblings, they pass their shares of "Do Carmo Veiculos" to her, who returns in time to save the company from all the chaos and mess that Dona Armênia has made ready with his mismanagement.

Other plots also deserve mention, such as the journalist Paula (Claudia Ohana), who in love with the work, ends up getting involved with Edu and goes on to write stories about the fall of the Albuquerque Figueroa family. Still in the plot is Jonas (Raul Cortez), who later finds himself to be Paula's mysterious father, a serious, friendly man who notes everything that goes on at the Figueroa mansion where he works as a butler and keeps great secrets about his past and his mysterious involvement with Isabelle.

== Cast ==
Actor	Role
Regina Duarte	Maria do Carmo Pereira
Glória Menezes	Laurinha Figueroa (Laura Albuquerque Figueroa); Main villain (Commits suicide by throwing herself from the top of a building)
Tony Ramos	Edu (Eduardo Albuquerque Figueroa)
Antônio Fagundes	Caio Szimanski
Paulo Gracindo	Betinho (Alberto Albuquerque Figueroa); Villain (Killed by Laurinha)
Renata Sorrah	Mariana Szimanski
Raul Cortez	Jonas
Daniel Filho	Renato Maia; Main villain (Commits suicide by setting fire to a gas station, blowing it up)
Cláudia Raia	Adriana Ross (Adriana Albuquerque Figueroa)
Cláudia Ohana	Paula Ramos
Aracy Balabanian	Dona Armênia Giovani
Nicette Bruno	Neiva Pereira
Andréa Beltrão	Ingrid Figueroa de Bresson
Gianfrancesco Guarnieri	Saldanha
Milton Morais	Vicente (Killed by Renato)
Cleyde Yáconis	Isabelle Figueroa de Bresson
Patrícia Pillar	Alaíde
Mônica Torres	Guida
Flávio Migliaccio	Seu Moreiras (Osvaldo Moreiras)
Lolita Rodrigues	Lena
Maurício Mattar	Rafael Albuquerque Figueroa
Marisa Orth	Nicinha (Eunice Moreiras)
Marcello Novaes	Geraldo (Gera)
Mônica Torres	Guida; Villain (Killed by Renato)
Dill Costa	Vilmar
Gerson Brener	Gerson
Jandir Ferrari	Gino
Aldine Müller	Ângela
José Augusto Branco	Dr. Ademar
Inês Galvão	Manon (Killed by Renato)
Ivan Cândido	Franklin; Villain (Killed by Renato)
Paulo Reis	Guga
Cláudio Corrêa e Castro	Dr. Rogério
Beatriz Lyra	Olga Matias
Jorge Cherques	Ciro Laurenza

== Reception ==
Marisa Orth won the 1990 Associação Paulista dos Críticos de Artes Award for Best Female Newcomer.
