= List of Brazilian television series =

This is a list of Brazilian-produced television series and television programs.

== 0–9 ==
- 1 Contra Todos (2016), drama
- 220 Volts (2011), comedy
- 3% (2016), drama/science fiction
- 9mm: São Paulo (2008), action/police drama

== A ==
- A Confeitaria (2012), cooking
- Adnet ao Vivo (2011), talk
- Agora É Tarde (2011), talk
- A Escolinha do Golias (1990), comedy
- A Fazenda (2009), reality
- A Floricultura da Nana (2008), children
- A Grande Família (2001), sitcom
- A Grande Música (2001), music
- A Lei e o Crime (2009), drama
- A Liga (2010), documentary
- A Praça é Nossa (1987), comedy
- Alice (2008), drama
- As Brasileiras (2012), comedy
- Annie Rose's Critter Camp (2020), animation

== B ==
- Batendo Ponto (2011), comedy
- Beija Sapo (2005), game show
- Beijo, Me liga (2009), comedy-drama
- Bem Estar (2011), variety
- Bicicleta e Melancia (2010), comedy-drama
- Big Brother Brasil (2002), reality
- Bom Dia e Companhia (1993), children
- Borges Importadora (2018), sitcom
- Brasil no Prato (2012), cooking
- Brazil's Next Top Model (2007), reality/ talent competition
- Busão do Brasil (2010), reality

== C ==
- A Cabana do Pai Tomás, telenovela
- Caminho das Índias, telenovela
- Caminhos do Coração, telenovela
- Canal Livre (1989), crime drama
- Castelo Rá-Tim-Bum (1994), children
- Carrossel (2012), telenovela
- Carrossel Animado (2007), children
- Cilada (2005), sitcom
- City of Men (2002), drama
- Cocoricó (1996), children
- Coisa Mais Linda (2019), drama
- Cozinha Caseira (2011), cooking
- Como Aproveitar o Fim do Mundo (2012), drama
- Corta! (2017), adult animation
- Confissões de Adolescente (1994), drama
- Custe o Que Custar (2008), news/comedy
- Conta Comigo (2020), animation

== D ==
- Dança dos Famosos (2005), reality
- De Cara Limpa (2010), comedy
- Detetives do Prédio Azul (2012), children
- Destino: São Paulo (2012), drama
- Donas de Casa Desesperadas (2007), comedy-drama

== E ==
- Escola pra Cachorro (2009), animated

== F ==
- Família Rocha (2010), sitcom
- Faith Show (1997), religion/talk
- Fazenda de Verão (2012), reality
- Fishtronaut (2009), animated
- Fora de Controle (2012), police drama
- Força-Tarefa (2009), drama/thriller
- Fudêncio e Seus Amigos (2005), animated sitcom
- Furfles MTV (2009), sitcom
- Furo MTV (2009), comedy
- Furia MTV (1990), music

== G ==
- Gamebros (2018), Crime drama
- Geleia do Rock (2009), reality/talent
- Gigantes do Brasil (2016), biography
- Globo Repórter (1973), documentary

== H ==
- Haunted Tales for Wicked Kids (2013), animated comedy
- Hermes & Renato (1999), comedy
- High School Musical: A Seleção (2008), reality/talent
- Hilda Furacão (1998), period drama
- Hipertensão (2002), reality
- Homens Gourmet (2012), cooking

== I ==
- Ídolos Brazil (2009), reality/talent
- Impuros (2018), crime drama

== J ==
- Jorel's Brother (2014), animated comedy
- Jovem Guarda (1965), music
- Julie and the Phantoms (2011), musical drama

== L ==
- Linha Direta (1999), news/reality
- Louca Família (2007), sitcom
- Louco por Elas (2012), sitcom

== M ==
- Mandrake (2005), comedy-drama
- Magnifica 70 (2015), drama
- O Mecanismo (2018), political drama
- Me Chama de Bruna (2016), drama
- Meu Amigãozão (2009), animation
- Mil Dias: A Saga da Construção de Brasília (2018), documentary/drama
- Monica's Gang (1980-2006, 2012–present) animated comedy
- Morando Sozinho (2010), comedy
- Mulheres Ricas (2012), reality show

== N ==
- Na Fama e Na Lama (2010), comedy-drama
- Newbie and the Disasternauts (2010), animated comedy
- No Limite (2000), reality

== O ==
- O Brasil É aqui, variety
- O Fantástico Mundo de Gregório (2012), comedy-drama
- O Show da Luna! (2014), animation
- Olívias na TV (2011), comedy
- Open Bar (2010), comedy
- O Quinto dos Infernos (2002), comedy
- Os Aspones (2004), comedy
- Oscar Freire 279 (2011), drama
- Osmar - A Primeira Fatia do Pão de Forma'' (2013), animated comedy
- Os Anjos do Sexo (2011), sitcom
- Os Caras de Pau (2006), comedy
- Os Normais (2001), sitcom
- Os Trapalhões (1977), comedy
- O Caminho Antigo ( ), religious

== P ==
- Pânico na Band (2012), comedy
- Pânico na TV (2003), comedy
- Pico da Neblina (2019), drama
- Pixcodelics (2005), animated
- Popstar (2002), reality/talent
- Por Um Fio (2010), reality
- Preamar (2012), comedy/drama
- Princesas do Mar (2008), animated
- Psi (2014), drama
- Programa da Palmirinha (2012), variety
- Programa do Jô (2000), comedy/talk

== Q ==
- Qual é o Seu Talento? (2009), talent
- Quarto do Jobi (2009), animation
- Que Mundo é Esse? (2015), travel documentary
- Quinta Categoria (2008), comedy

== R ==
- Rei Davi (2012), historical drama
- Rockgol (1995), sports
- Ronaldinho Gaucho's Team (2011), animated
- Rua Augusta (2018), drama

== S ==
- Sábado Animado (), children
- Sansão e Dalila (2011), historical drama
- Sai de Baixo (1996), sitcom
- Se Ela Dança, Eu Danço (2011), talent
- Sem Controle (2007), sitcom
- Show do Tom (2004), comedy/talk
- Sítio do Picapau Amarelo (2012), animated
- Supermax (2016), Horror/Action

== T ==
- Tamanho Família (1985), sitcom
- Tapas & Beijos (2011), comedy
- The Amazing Race: A Corrida Milionária (2007), reality/game show
- The Nadas (2005), sitcom
- The Chosen One (2019), thriller
- The Strange World of Coffin Joe, talk
- The Ultimate Fighter: Brazil (2012), reality/sports
- Toma Lá, Dá Cá (2007), sitcom
- Top Model O Reality (2012), reality
- The Voice Brasil (2012), reality/talent competition
- Tudo Simples (2012), variety
- TV Colosso (1993), children
- TV Fama (2000), variety
- TV Globinho (2000), children
- TV Pirata (1988), comedy
- TV Xuxa (2005), variety

== U ==
- UFC sem Limites (2009), sports

== V ==
- Vídeo Show (1983), variety
- Você Decide (1992), thriller mystery

== X ==
- X-Tudo (1992), children

== Z ==
- Zapping Zone (2001), children
- Zé do Caixão (2015), comedy
- Zorra Total (1999), comedy

== See also ==
- List of LGBTQ characters in Brazilian soap operas and series
