= List of LGBTQ characters in Brazilian soap operas and series =

This is a list of Brazilian soap operas and series featuring lesbian, gay, bisexual, transgender, and queer (LGBTQ) characters. Sexual orientation and/or gender identity may have been shown on screen, described in dialogue, or mentioned.

== 1960s ==
Year	Soap opera/Serie	Broadcaster	Characters	Actors	Notes
1963	Calúnia	Tv Tupi	Karen Wright; Martha Dobie	Vida Alves; Geórgia Gomide	Karen and Martha shared the first same-sex kiss in the history of Brazilian television.

== 1970s ==
Year	Soap opera/Serie	Broadcaster	Characters	Actors	Notes
1970	Assim na Terra como no Céu	Rede Globo	Rodolfo Augusto (Gugu)	Ary Fontoura	Gugu is a gay fashion designer and carnival artist.
1974	O Rebu	Rede Globo	Conrad Mahler; Cauê; Glorinha Rezende; Roberta Menezes	Ziembinski; Buza Ferraz; Isabel Ribeiro; Regina Vianna	Conrad supported Cauê financially and, out of jealousy, killed his ex-girlfriend. The soap opera implies a relationship of financial dependence, but does not confirm a same-sex relationship between the two. Glorinha and Roberta are considered the first lesbian couple on Brazilian television.
1975	O Grito	Rede Globo	Agenor	Rubens de Falco	Agenor would sneak out at night, wearing extravagant clothes; however, it's not proven whether he was cross-dressing.
1977	O Astro	Rede Globo	Henri	José Luiz Rodi	Henri is gay.
1978	Dancin' Days	Rede Globo	Everaldo	Renato Pedrosa	A gay butler.
1979	Marrom Glacê	Rede Globo	Valdomiro; Pierre Lafond	Laerte Morrone; Nestor de Montemar	Caricatured representation of homosexuals.
1979	Os Gigantes	Rede Globo	Paloma Gurgel; Renata Garcia	Dina Sfat; Lidia Brondi	A lesbian romance between the two characters, later removed from the plot.
1979	Malu Mulher	Rede Globo	Maria	Ângela Leal	In the episode "A Amiga" (The Friend), Maria has romantic and sexual feelings for Malu.

== 1980s ==
Year	Soap opera/serie	Broadcaster	Characters	Actors	Notes
1981	Brilhante	Rede Globo	Inácio Newman; Sergio; Claudio	Dennis Carvalho; João Paulo Adour; Buza Ferraz	Inácio e Sergio are boyfriends. Claudio and Inácio end up dating at the end of the soap opera.
1981	Ciranda de Pedra	Rede Globo	Letícia	Mônica Torres	Letícia dresses and behaves like a man.
1982	Os Adolescentes	TV Bandeirantes	Caíto	Flávio Guarnieri	Caito is homosexual.
1984	Partido Alto	Rede Globo	Políbio; Raposo	Guilherme Karan; Nardel Ramos	Políbio and Raposo are homosexuals.
1985	Um Sonho a Mais	Rede Globo	Anabela Freire; Florisbela Freire; Clarabela Freire; Olga Del Volga; Pedro Ernesto	Ney Latorraca; Marco Nanini; Antônio Pedro; Patrício Bisso; Carlos Kroeber	Anabela, Florisbela, Clarabela, and Olga Del Volga are travestis. Pedro married Anabela.
1985	Roque Santeiro	Rede Globo	João Ligeiro; Jurandir; Lúcio Armando	Maurício Mattar; Cláudio Gaya; Jorge Fernando	João Ligeiro is gay, but his character's development was interrupted by censorship. In the original text, he was to be a woman who was raised as a man. Jurandir and Lúcio are the stereotype of gay dressmakers.
1986	Anos Dourados	Rede Globo	Marina Campos Dornelles	Bianca Byington	Marina ended the soap opera living in New York with her partner.
1986	Selva de Pedra	Rede Globo	Cíntia Vilhena; Fernanda Arruda Campos	Beth Goulart; Christiane Torloni	Cíntia and Fernanda are bisexual, but their romantic scenes were reworked due to public pressure.
1986	Roda de Fogo	Rede Globo	Mário Liberato; Jacinto Donato	Cecil Thiré; Cláudio Curi	Mario and Jacinto had intimate moments.
1987	Mandala	Rede Globo	Argemiro; Laio; Chris	Carlos Augusto Strazzer; Perry Salles; Marcelo Picchi	Argemiro and Laio had a very close relationship, understood by the public as something more than friendship. Laio is bisexual and Chris is his lover.
1987	Sassaricando	Rede Globo	Bob Bacall	Jorge Lafond	Bob is a queer character.
1987	Carmem	Rede Manchete	Dr. Jean-Pierre Junot	Maurice Vaneau	Dr. Junot is bisexual.
1988	Vale Tudo	Rede Globo	Cecília; Laís; Marília	Lala Deheinzelin; Cristina Prochaska; Bia Seidl	Cecilia, Lais, and Marília are lesbians.
1988	Bebê a Bordo	Rede Globo	Joana Mendonça	Débora Duarte	Joana is a masculine lesbian.
1988	Olho por Olho	Rede Manchete	Dinorá	Cláudia Celeste	Cláudia Celeste was the first travesti actress to play Dinorá, a travesti character, on Brazilian television.
1989	Pacto de Sangue	Rede Globo	Bombom	Ricardo Petraglia	Bombom is gay.
1989	Tieta	Rede Globo	Ninete	Rogéria	Ninete is travesti.
1989	Top Model	Rede Globo	Marvin Gaye	Miguel Magno	Marvin is gay.
1989	Kananga do Japão	Rede Manchete	Madame Satã	Jorge Lafond	Madame Satã is gay.

== 1990s ==
Year	Soap opera/serie	Broadcaster	Characters	Actors	Notes
1990	Mãe de Santo	Rede Manchete	Lúcio; Rafael	Raí Alves; Daniel Barcellos	Lúcio and Rafael are a gay couple and they shared the first same-sex kiss on broadcast television.
1990	Mico Preto	Rede Globo	Zé Luis; José Maria	Miguel Falabella; Marcelo Picchi	Zé Luis and José Maria are a gay couple.
1990	Boca do Lixo	Rede Globo	Henrique Ribeiro; Tomás Oliveira	Reginaldo Faria; Alexandre Frota	Henrique and Tomás were having an affair.
1990	Pantanal	Rede Manchete	Zaqueu	João Alberto Pinheiro	Zaqueu is gay.
1990	Barriga de Aluguel	Rede Globo	Lulu	Eri Johnson	Lulu is gay.
1992	Pedra sobre Pedra	Rede Globo	Adamastor; Paulo Henrique	Pedro Paulo Rangel; Reinaldo Gonzaga	Adamastor is in love with Carlão. Paulo Henrique is openly gay.
1992	Deus nos Acuda	Rede Globo	Gina	Jandir Ferrari	Gino traveled to Europe and returned to Brazil as the travesti Gina.
1993	Sex Appeal	Rede Globo	Caio Hubermann	Otávio Augusto	Caio is gay.
1993	Renascer	Rede Globo	Buba	Maria Luísa Mendonça	Buba is intersex.
1993	Guerra Sem Fim	Rede Manchete	Monarca; Viúva Negra	Hélcio Magalhães; Paulão Barbosa	Monarca and Viúva Negra are gay and end the soap opera together as a couple.
1995	A Próxima Vítima	Rede Globo	Sandro Carvalho Rossi; Jefferson Noronha	André Gonçalves; Lui Mendes	Sandro and Jefferson are a gay couple.
1995	Engraçadinha	Rede Globo	Letícia	Maria Luísa Mendonça	Letícia is a lesbian.
1995	Explode Coração	Rede Globo	Sarita Vitti	Floriano Peixoto	There is no consensus on whether Sarita is transgender or a drag queen.
1996	Salsa e Merengue	Rede Globo	Dayse Menezes; Tereza	Rosi Campos; Angela Rebello	Dayse and Tereza are lesbians and end the soap opera together.
1996	O Fim do Mundo	Rede Globo	Gisele; Chico Veloso	David Brazil; Tonico Pereira	Gisele is a queer character. Chico Veloso reveals his sexuality in the face of the threat of the End of the World.
1996	Xica da Silva	Rede Manchete	José Maria (Zé Mulher)	Guilherme Piva	José Maria is gay.
1997	A Indomada	Rede Globo	Vieira; Zenilda	Catarina Abdala; Renata Sorrah	Vieira is a lesbian. Zenilda is bisexual.
1997	Zazá	Rede Globo	Ro-rô Pedalada; Silas Vadan	Marcos Breda; Ney Latorraca	Ro-rô Pedalada is bisexual and a drag queen. Silas is pansexual.
1997	Por Amor	Rede Globo	Rafael Fontes; Alex	Odilon Wagner; Beto Nasci	Rafael is bisexual and Alex is gay. Rafael left his wife to be with Alex.
1998	Fascinação	SBT	Renê	Blota Filho	Renê is gay.
1998	Hilda Furacão	Rede Globo	Cintura Fina	Matheus Nachtergaele	Cintura Fina is travesti.
1998	Torre de Babel	Rede Globo	Leila Sampaio; Rafaela Katz	Sílvia Pfeifer; Christiane Torloni	Leila and Rafaela were a lesbian couple, murdered due to public pressure.
1999	Suave Veneno	Rede Globo	Uálber Cañedo; Edilberto Ferreira	Diogo Vilela; Luiz Carlos Tourinho	Uálber and Edilberto are gay.

== 2000s ==
Year	Soap opera/serie	Broadcaster	Characters	Actors	Notes
2000	Uga-Uga	Rede Globo	Ivone Shirley	Hairton Júnior	Ivone is travesti.
2000	Malhação	Rede Globo	Sócrates; Carlos	Erik Marmo; Gabriel Gracindo	Sócrates e Carlos are gay.
2001	Roda da Vida	RecordTV	Ronaldo	Ernando Tiago	Ronaldo was abused by his father for being gay.
2001	Um Anjo Caiu do Céu	Rede Globo	Selmo de Windsor	Daniel Dantas	Selmo is gay.
2001	As Filhas da Mãe	Rede Globo	Ramona Barbosa Cavalcante	Cláudia Raia	Ramona is trans woman.
2002	Desejos de Mulher	Rede Globo	Ariel Britz; Tadeu Borges; Cristiano	José Wilker; Otávio Müller; Sérgio Rufino	Ariel and Tadeu are gay and live together. Cristiano, the house butler, is also gay.
2002	Sabor da Paixão	Rede Globo	Quintino Saraiva; Silvano Cilbuski	Edney GIovenazzi; Sérgio Mamberti	Quintino and Silvano are a same-sex couple. Some sources consider them bisexual, as they spent the entire telenovela flirting with the character Hermínia.
2003	Mulheres Apaixonadas	Rede Globo	Clara; Rafaela	Alinne Moraes; Paula Picarelli	Clara and Rafaela are a lesbian couple.
2003	Celebridade	Rede Globo	Laura; Dora	Cláudia Abreu; Renata Sorrah	Laura is bisexual and has a sexual relationship with Dora, who is a lesbian.
2003	Kubanacan	Rede Globo	Manolo; Waiter at the Copacabana Night Club	Luiz Guilherme; Wilson de Santos	Manolo is homosexual. The waiter at the Copacabana Night Club is gay, he had significant appearances in the plot, but his name was never revealed.
2004	Senhora do Destino	Rede Globo	Eleonora; Jennifer; Turcão; Ubiraci (Bira)	Mylla Christie; Bárbara Borges; Marco Vilella; Luiz Henrique Nogueira	Eleonora and Jennifer are a lesbian couple. Turcão is bisexual and forms a romantic couple with Bira, who is gay.
2005	América	Rede Globo	Junior; Zeca	Bruno Gagliasso; Erom Cordeiro	Junior and Zeca had a relationship at the end of the soap opera.
2005	A Lua Me Disse	Rede Globo	Samovar de Santa Luzia; Valdo Magalhães; Dona Roma	Cássio Scapin; Hugo Gross; Miguel Magno	Samovar and Valdo are gay and ended the soap opera together. At the time, Dona Roma was referred to in the press as a travesti or cross-dresser, but there are doubts about the character's true gender identity, as she is also considered a trans woman.
2005	Belíssima	Rede Globo	Gigi; Rebeca Cavalcanti; Karen Barros	Pedro Paulo Rangel; Carolina Ferraz; Mônica Torres	Gigi is gay. Rebeca and Karen are lesbians.
2006	Cidadão Brasileiro	Rede Record	Nilo Ramos	Thiago Chagas	Nilo is gay.
2006	Cobras & Lagartos	Rede Globo	Orã Munhoz	Luís Melo	Orã is a cross-dresser.
2006	Páginas da Vida	Rede Globo	Rubinho; Marcelo Bueno	Fernando Eiras; Thiago Picchi	Rubinho and Marcelo are a gay couple.
2006	Malhação	Rede Globo	Marcela Prado	Paula Kill	Marcela is lesbian.
2007	Paraíso Tropical	Rede Globo	Rodrigo Batista; Tiago Sampaio; Hugo; Felipe	Carlos Casagrande; Sérgio Abreu; Marcelo Laham; Miguel Kelner	Rodrigo and Tiago are married. Hugo is gay and is dating Felipe.
2007	Toma Lá, Da Cá	Rede Globo	Deise Coturno; Cópellia Rocha	Norma Bengel; Arlete Salles	Deise is a masculine lesbian. Cópellia is pansexual.
2007	Duas Caras	Rede Globo	Bernardinho; Heraldo Carreira; Carlão	Thiago Mendonça; Alexandre Slaviero; Lugui Palhares	Bernardinho is bisexual. He had a fling with Heraldo, but at the end of the soap opera he ended up with Carlão.
2007	Dance Dance Dance	Band	Christian Garcia	Lorenzo Martin	Christian is gay.
2007	Caminhos do Coração	RecordTV	Danilo Mayer; Bené	Cláudio Heinrich; Déo Garcez	Danilo is gay and a victim of a gold digger in the first season. Bené comes out as gay and falls in love with Danilo in the second season.
2008	Os Mutantes	RecordTV	Danilo Mayer; Bené	Cláudio Heinrich; Déo Garcez	Danilo is gay and a victim of a gold digger in the first season. Bené comes out as gay and falls in love with Danilo in the second season.
2008	Beleza Pura	Rede Globo	Betão	Rodrigo López	Betão is gay.
2008	Queridos Amigos	Rede Globo	Benny; Jurandir; Cíntia; Brenda	Guilherme Weber; Sidney Santiago; Odilon Esteves; Ricardo Monastero	Benny is gay and dating Jurandir. Cíntia and Brenda are travestis.
2008	A Favorita	Rede Globo	Orlandinho; Stela Ribas; Dr. Dante Salvatore	Iran Malfitano; Paula Burlamaqui; Walmor Chagas	Throughout the entire telenovela, Orlandinho is portrayed as gay, but ends up in a relationship with a woman. Stela is a lesbian. Salvatore is gay.
2008	Chamas da Vida	Rede Record	Docinho	Roberto Bomtempo	Docinho is a travesti social worker.
2008	Três Irmãs	Rede Globo	Nelson Santana; Adamastor Pamplona	Aloísio de Abreu; Carlos Loffler	Nelson is bisexual. Adamastor is gay.
2009	Força-Tarefa	Rede Globo	Selma; Jaqueline	Hermila Guedes; Fabiula Nascimento	Sergeant Selma kisses Jaqueline.
2009	Cinquentinha	Rede Globo	Carlo Berganti	Pierre Baitelli	Carlo is gay.
2009	Caras & Bocas	Rede Globo	Cássio; Sid	Marco Pigossi; Klebber Toledo	Cássio and Sid are gays.
2009	Bela, a Feia	Rede Record	Diego Souza; Diogo Marques; Haroldo Palhares	Daniel Erthal; Sérgio Menezes; João Camargo	Diego denies being gay and his passion for Diogo, who is also gay. Haroldo is a gay hairdresser.
2009	Vende-se um Véu de Noiva	SBT	Andressa Carla	Fabianna Brazil	Andressa is trans.
2009	Cama de Gato	Rede Globo	Pink	Maurício Machado	Pink is bisexual.
2009	Viver a Vida	Rede Globo	Osmar	Marcelo Valle	Osmar is bisexual.
2009	Malhação ID	Rede Globo	Alê	William Barbier	Alê is asexual.

== 2010s ==
Year	Soap opera/serie	Broadcaster	Characters	Actors	Notes
2010	Ti Ti Ti	Rede Globo	Osmar Sampaio; Julinho; Thales Salmerón; Lourdes Mesquita; Paula; Adriano Novaes	Gustavo Leão; André Arteche; Armando Babaioff; Maria Carol Rebello; Viviane Netto; Rafael Zulu	Osmar and Julinho are a couple. Some time after Osmar's death, Julinho becomes involved with Thales, who is also gay. Lourdes é lésbica e tem um relacionamento com Paula. Adriano é gay.
2010	Passione	Rede Globo	Arthuzinho	Júlio Andrade	Arthuzinho is gay.
2011	Insensato Coração	Rede Globo	Roni Fragonard; Eduardo Aboim; Hugo Abrantes; Xicão; Nelson Mesquita; Gilvan dos Santos; Araci Laranjeira	Leonardo Miggiorin; Rodrigo Andrade; Marcos Damigo; Wendell Bendelack; Edson Fieschi; Miguel Roncato; Cristiana Oliveira	Roni, Eduardo, Hugo, Xicão, Nelson, and Gilvan are gay. Araci is a lesbian.
2011–15	Tapas & Beijos	Rede Globo	Stephanie; Lorraine Cristine	Rafael Primot; Sergio Guizé	Stephanie and Lorraine are travestis.
2011	Vidas em Jogo	Rede Record	Augusta Figueira de Andrade	Denise Del Vecchio	Augusta is transgender.
2011	Morde & Assopra	Rede Globo	Áureo Alves Junqueira; Josué Batista; Sargento Xavier; Elaine (Pirulitona)	André Gonçalves; Joaquim Lopes; Anderson Di Rizzi; Otaviano Costa	Áureo is gay. Josué had a heterosexual relationship and runs away with Áureo, which could be classified as bisexual. Elaine is a trans woman and assumes a female identity at Xavier's request.
2011	Lara com Z	Rede Globo	Carlo Berganti	Pierre Baitelli	Carlo is gay. He was brought back from Cinquentinha.
2011	O Astro	Rede Globo	Felipe Cerqueira; Henri Sorel; Cleiton; Pablo	Henri Castelli; João Baldasserini; Frank Menezes; Pablo Sanábio	Felipe is bisexual and Henri is gay. They had a casual relationship. Cleiton and Pablo are also gay, with Pablo performing as a drag queen.
2011	Natália	TV Brasil	Glória; Jean-Louis Crepon	Maurício Branco; Rodrigo Candelot	Gloria and Jean-Louis are gay and they kiss in a scene from the first season.
2011	Fina Estampa	Rede Globo	Crodoaldo Valério (Crô); Fabrícia; Alice; Íris.	Marcelo Serrado; Luciana Paes; Thaís de Campos; Eva Wilma	Crô is gay. Fabrícia is a trans woman. Iris and Alice, despite never admitting they were partners, maintained a very close and public relationship.
2011	Aquele Beijo	Rede Globo	Ana Girafa	Luís Salém	Ana Girafa is travesti.
2011	Amor e Revolução	SBT	Marcela; Marina; Chico; Jeová	Luciana Vendramini; Giselle Tigre; Carlos Thiré; Lui Mendes	Marcela and Marina shared the first same-sex kiss in Brazilian soap operas. Chico and Jeová are gay and had a relationship.
2011–12	Macho Man	Rede Globo	Nelson Zucatelli; Fréderic; Cherry	Jorge Fernando; Roney Facchini; Raphael Véles	Nelson was gay, but "stopped" being so after an accident. Frédéric and Cherry are married.
2012	Avenida Brasil	Rede Globo	Roni; Sidney Mendonça	Daniel Rocha; Felipe Titto	Roni is a gay character, although he never comes out throughout the story. He shows strong feelings for his friend Leandro, who is heterosexual, but ends up marrying Suelen—who is also Leandro's love interest. At the end of the story, the three end up living together. Sidney is bisexual.
2012	Cheias de Charme	Rede Globo	Sidney Monteiro; Anderson; Eloy Di Marco	Daniel Dantas; Guilherme Winter; Gustavo Mendes	Sidney and Eloy are gay. Anderson is Sidney's deceased boyfriend.
2012	Gabriela	Rede Globo	Miss Pirangi	Gero Camilo	Miss Pirangi is a gay man.
2012	O Brado Retumbante	Rede Globo	Julie	Murilo Armacollo	Julie is transgender.
2012–13	Balacobaco	Rede Record	Breno	Léo Rosa	Breno is gay.
2012	Salve Jorge	Rede Globo	Anita	Maria Clara Spinelli	Anita is transgender.
2012–21	Sessão de Terapia	GNT	Felipe Alcântara	Rafael Lozano	Felipe is gay.
2013	O Canto da Sereia	Rede Globo	Sereia; Mara	Ísis Valverde; Camila Morgado	Sereia and Mara had a secret affair.
2013	Sangue Bom	Rede Globo	Filipinho; Xande; Peixinho; Tio Lili; Mulher Pau-de-Jacu; Sueli Pedrosa; Vivian; Tábata	Josafá Filho; Felipe Lima; Júlio Oliveira; Edwin Luisi; Luis André Alvim; Tuna Dwek; Lu Camy; Samya Pascotto	Filipinho, Xande, Tio Lili, and Peixinho are gay. Mulher Pau-de-Jacu is travesti. Sueli Pedrosa, Vivian, and Tábata are lesbians.
2013–atualidade	Vai Que Cola	Multishow	Ferdinando; Alejandro	Marcus Majella; Pedroca Monteiro	Ferdinando is an effeminate gay man who is dating Alejandro.
2013	Saramandaia	Rede Globo	Petronílio Amaral; Vantuil	Theodoro Cochrane; Diego Cristo	Petronílio and Vantuil are gay.
2013	Dona Xepa	Rede Record	Graxinha	Augusto Garcia	Graxinha is gay.
2013	Amor à Vida	Rede Globo	Eron Torgano; Félix Khoury; Niko	Marcello Antony; Mateus Solano; Thiago Fragoso	Eron and Niko were a gay couple. Félix is gay and, along with Niko, shared the first kiss between two men in a Rede Globo soap opera.
2013	Jóia Rara	Rede Globo	Joel; Aderbal Feitosa	Marcelo Médici; Armando Babaioff	Joel is gay. Aderbal is bisexual.
2013	Pecado Mortal	Rede Record	Picasso	Victor Hugo	In the final chapter, Picasso reveals his repressed love for Carlão.
2013–16	Pé na Cova	Rede Globo	Odete Roitman; Tamanco; Marcão/Markassa	Luma Costa; Mart'nália; Maurício Xavier	Odete Roitman is bisexual. Tamanco is a lesbian woman with masculine characteristics. Markassa is travesti.
2014	Now Generation	Rede Globo	Dorothy Benson	Luís Miranda	Dorothy is transgender.
2014	Em Família	Rede Globo	Clara; Marina; Vanessa	Giovanna Antonelli; Tainá Müller; Maria Eduarda de Carvalho	Clara, Marina, and Vanessa are lesbians. The first same-sex marriage in Brazilian soap operas took place between them.
2014	Império	Rede Globo	Téo Pereira; Cláudio Bolgari; Leonardo de Souza; Xaná; Etevaldo; Felipe	Paulo Betti; José Mayer; Klebber Toledo; Aílton Graça; André Gonçalves; Laércio Fonseca	Téo e Felipe are gay. Cláudio is gay, but he is married to a woman and lives a heteronormative life. Leonardo and Cláudio are in a same-sex relationship. Leonardo also becomes involved with Etevaldo during the course of the soap opera. Xaná is travesti.
2014	Alto Astral	Rede Globo	Pepito	Conrado Caputto	Pepito is gay.
2014	Doce de Mãe	Rede Globo	Fernando de Souza; Roberto	Matheus Nachtergaele; Evandro Soldatelli	Fernando and Roberto are gay and dating.
2014	Vitória	Rede Record	Virgulino Aparecido	Ricardo Ferreira	Virgulino is a victim of a neo-Nazi group for being gay.
2014	Malhação Sonhos	Rede Globo	Priscila Lima (Pri); Lírio Lorenzzo	Gabi Lopes; Paulo Dalagnoli	Pri and Lírio are bisexual.
2015	I Love Paraisópolis	Rede Globo	Júnior	Frank Menezes	Júnior is gay.
2015	Verdades Secretas	Rede Globo	Visky; Bruno Ticiano; Sam; Stephanie; Mayra; Maurice; Anthony	Rainer Cadete; João Vítor Silva; Felipe de Carolis; Yasmin Brunet; Rhaisa Batista; Fernando Eiras; Reynaldo Gianecchini	Visky is bisexual. Bruno and Sam have sex and are supposedly bisexual. Stephanie and Mayra kiss throughout the telenovela, and it's implied that they end up together. Anthony has relationships with women, and at the end of the story, he begins an affair with Maurice.
2015	Felizes para Sempre?	Rede Globo	Daniela; Denise; Marília	Martha Nowill; Paolla Oliveira; Maria Fernanda Cândido	Daniela is a lesbian and is in a stable relationship with Denise. Denise becomes involved with Marília.
2015	Os Experientes	Rede Globo	Francisca; Maria Helena	Selma Egrei; Joana Fomm	Francisca and Maria Helena are a lesbian couple.
2015	Sete Vidas	Rede Globo	Eriberto; Esther; Renan	Fábio Herford; Regina Duarte; Fernando Eiras	Eriberto and Esther are bisexual. Renan is gay. Esther was married to a woman for several years, but ended the soap opera married to her ex-husband. Eriberto was married to a woman, but ended up with Renan at the end of the soap opera.
2015	Babilônia	Rede Globo	Teresa Petruccelli; Estela Marcondes; Ivan Ferreira; Sérgio da Matta; Raul; Ùrsula Andressa	Fernanda Montenegro; Nathalia Timberg; Marcello Melo Jr. Cláudio Lins; André Dias; Rogéria	Teresa and Estela are lesbians. Ivan and Sérgio are gay. Raul is gay and denounced Aderbal for homophobia. Úrsula Andressa is transgender.
2015	Totalmente Demais	Rede Globo	Max; Adele; Pietro	Pablo Sanábio; Jéssica Ellen; Marat Descartes	Max and Pietro are gay. Adele is a lesbian.
2015	A Regra do Jogo	Rede Globo	Úrsula; Duda; Breno / Valquíria	Júlia Rabello; Giselle Batista; Otávio Müller	Úrsula is a lesbian, Duda is bisexual, and they are a couple. Breno is the cross-dresser Valquíria.
2015–19	Os Homens São de Marte... E é pra Lá que Eu Vou!	GNT	Aníbal; Edgar	Luís Salém; Gustavo Machado	Aníbal and Edgar are gay and married.
2016	Nada Será Como Antes	Rede Globo	Júlia Azevedo Queiroz; Beatriz dos Santos; Aristides; Rodolfo do Vale	Letícia Colin; Bruna Marquezine; Bruno Garcia; Alejandro Claveaux	Julia and Beatriz become involved during the course of the series. Aristides and Rodolfo are gay.
2016	Supermax	Rede Globo	Janette	Maria Clara Spinelli	Janette is a trans woman.
2016–20	3%	Netflix	Ariel	Marina Mathey	Ariel is a trans woman.
2016	Êta Mundo Bom!	Rede Globo	Lauro Ortiz; Tobias Assis	Marcelo Argenta; Cleiton Morais	Lauro and Tobias are gay.
2016	Liberdade, Liberdade	Rede Globo	André Viegas; Tolentino Ramos	Caio Blat; Ricardo Pereira	André and Tolentino are gay. The soap opera featured the first same-sex sexual relationship scene in Brazilian telenovelas.
2016	A Lei do Amor	Rede Globo	Zelito; Wesley; Gledson Rocha; Flávia Bezerra; Gabi	Danilo Ferreira; Gil Coelho; Raphael Ghanem; Maria Flor; Fernanda Nobre	Zelito and Flávia are bisexual. Wesley and Gledson are gay. Gabi is a lesbian.
2016–20	Xilindró	Multishow	Xuxeta	Lindays Paulinho	Adilson da Silva is a former male prostitute who becomes the travesti Xuxeta.
2016	Sol Nascente	Rede Globo	Bernardo Meirelles; Fábio	Márcio Kieling; Luka Ribeiro	Bernardo and Fábio are gay and married.
2016	Rock Story	Rede Globo	Vanessa do Rosário	Lorena Comparato	Vanessa is a lesbian.
2016	Malhação: Pro Dia Nascer Feliz	Rede Globo	Ortega	Zé Junior	Ortega is gay.
2016–20	Me Chama de Bruna	Fox Premium	Miranda	Maitê Proença	Miranda is a lesbian.
2016–20	1 Contra Todos	Fox Premium	Mãe	Silvio Guindane	Mãe is transgender.
2017–22	Sob Pressão	Rede Globo	Décio; Kleber; Jamille; Kátia	Bruno Garcia; Kelner Macêdo; Gabrielle Joie; Giowana Cambrone	Décio is dating Kleber, an HIV-positive patient he met at the hospital. Jamille and Kátia are travestis.
2017	A Força do Querer	Rede Globo	Ivan Garcia; Cláudio; Nonato / Elis Miranda	Carol Duarte; Gabriel Stauffer; Silvero Pereira	Ivan is a transgender man. Before his transition, he is involved with Cláudio. At the end of the story, Ivan resumes his relationship with Cláudio. Nonato is the drag queen Elis Miranda.
2017	Edifício Paraíso	GNT	Soraia; Kátia	Marisa Orth; Chandelly Braz	Soraia and Kátia are lesbians and girlfriends.
2017	Malhação: Viva a Diferença	Rede Globo	Lica; Samantha; Gabriel	Manoela Aliperti; Giovanna Grigio; Luis Galves	Lica and Samantha are a couple. Gabriel is gay.
2017	Os Dias Eram Assim	Rede Globo	Leon; Rudá	Maurício Destri; Konstantinos Sarris	Leon and Rudá become a couple during the course of the plot.
2017–22	Tô de Graça	Multishow	Mariah; Maicon	Evelyn Castro; Andy Grecker	Mariah is a lesbian. In the episode "Mudança de Sexo" (lit. 'Sex Change'), she reveals her desire to be a trans man, but decides against transitioning. Maicon é gay.
2017	Pega Pega	Rede Globo	Douglas Saldanha; Siqueira	Guilherme Weber; Marcelo Escorel	Douglas and Siqueira are gay.
2017	O Outro Lado do Paraíso	Rede Globo	Samuel; Cido; Nick; Maciel	Eriberto Leão; Rafael Zulu; Fábio Lago; Andy Gercker	Samuel and Cido are bisexual and are a couple. Nick and Maciel are gay.
2018	Onde Nascem os Fortes	Rede Globo	Ramirinho; Valdir; Gil; Valquíria; Aldina	Jesuíta Barbosa; Pedro Fasanaro; Clarissa Pinheiro; Carla Salle; Camila Márdila	Ramirinho is gay and performs as the drag queen Shakira do Sertão. Valdir ends up dating Ramirinho at the end of the story. Gil is a lesbian. In the past, Valquíria, who is dating Hermano, had a relationship with Aldina.
2018	Segundo Sol	Rede Globo	Maura; Selma; Groa; Galdino; Du Love	Nanda Costa; Carol Fazu; André Dias; Narcival Rubens; Ciro Salles	Maura and Selma are bisexual and are a couple. Groa and Galdino are gay. Du Love was Galdino's lover.
2018	Deus Salve o Rei	Rede Globo	Heráclito de Fernandes; Pietro	Marcos Oliveira; Ricardo Monastero	Heráclito and Pietro are lovers.
2018	Orgulho e Paixão	Rede Globo	Luccino Pricelli; Otávio Mastronelli	Juliano Laham; Pedro Henrique Müller	Luccino and Otávio are gay.
2018	Malhação: Vidas Brasileiras	Rede Globo	Michael; Santiago	Nila; Giovanni Dopico	Michael and Santiago are gay.
2018	O Sétimo Guardião	Rede Globo	Adamastor Davis Crawford; Marcos Paulo	Theodoro Cochrane; Nany People	Adamastor is gay. Marcos Paulo is a transgender woman who prefers to keep her birth name.
2018	O Tempo Não Para	Rede Globo	Igor Vilas; Pedro Ramos	Léo Bahia; Matheus Lisboa	Igor and Pedro are gay.
2018-19	Se Eu Fechar Os Olhos Agora	Rede Globo	Adalgisa Bastos; Anita	Mariana Ximenes; Thainá Duarte	Adalgisa is having an extramarital affair with Anita.
2019	Verão 90	Rede Globo	Leonardo / Sabrina; Candé	Miguel Rômulo; Kayky Brito	Leonardo is gay and performs as the drag queen Sabrina. Candé is gay.
2019	It's a Match	Globoplay	Nena	Giovanna Lancellotti	Nena is a lesbian.
2019	Bom Sucesso	Rede Globo	Gláucia; Willian; Pablo Sanchez; Michelly	Shirley Cruz; Diego Montez; Rafael Infante; Gabrielle Joie	Gláucia is a lesbian. Willian and Pablo are gay. Michelly is transgender.
2019–20	Girls from Ipanema	Netflix	Thereza Soares; Helô Albuquerque; Nelson Soares	Mel Lisboa; Thaila Ayala; Alexandre Cioletti	Thereza is bisexual and becomes involved with Helô. Nelson has relationships with other men.
2019	Malhação: Toda Forma de Amar	Rede Globo	Gugo; Serginho	Pedro Alves; João Pedro Oliveira	Guga and Serginho are gay.
2019	Feras	MTV Brasil	Guille	Jesuíta Barbosa	Guille is bisexual.
2019	Órfãos da Terra	Rede Globo	Camila Nasser; Valéria Augusta	Anajú Dorigon; Bia Arantes	Camila and Valeria are bisexual and are a couple.
2019	A Dona do Pedaço	Rede Globo	Agno; Leandro; Britney	Malvino Salvador; Guilherme Leicam; Glamour Garcia	Agno and Leandro are gay. Britney is a trans woman.
2019–2021	Segunda Chamada	Rede Globo	Natasha / Robson; Marcelo; Prof. Paulo	Linn da Quebrada; Artur Volpi; Caio Blat	Natasha is travesti. Marcelo and Paulo were having a secret relationship.
2019	Toda Forma de Amor	Canal Brasil	Hanna; Milinho; Paulo; Bianca; Marcela; Cláudio	Guta Ruiz; Daniel Infantini; Eucir de Souza; Wally Ruy; Gabrielle Joie; Otávio Martins	Hanna is a lesbian. Milinho is gay and a drag queen. Paulo is a crossdresser. Bianca is transgender. Marcela is a trans woman. Cláudio is gay.
2019–21	Aruanas	Globoplay	Olga; André; Ivona	Camila Pitanga; Vitor Thiré; Elisa Volpatto	Olga is bisexual. André is gay. Ivona is a lesbian and is having an affair with Olga.
2019	Stella Models	Canal Brasil	Priscilla	Anna Markun	Priscilla is travesti.
2019–21	Amor de Mãe	Rede Globo	Leila; Penha; Prof. Felipe; Miguel; Jorge	Arieta Corrêa; Clarissa Pinheiro; Raphael Logam; Giulio Lopes; Tiago Martelli	Leila and Penha become a couple in the final stretch of the plot. Professor Felipe is gay. Miguel is gay. Jorge has queer mannerisms and is gay.
