= Maestrini =

Maestrini is a surname. Notable people with the surname include:

- Alessandra Maestrini (born 1977), Brazilian actress and musician
- Dario Maestrini (1886–1975), Italian physiologist and scientist
- Liliane Maestrini (born 1987), Brazilian beach volleyball player
