= Alessandra Maestrini =

Brazilian actress and singer-songwriter (born 1977)

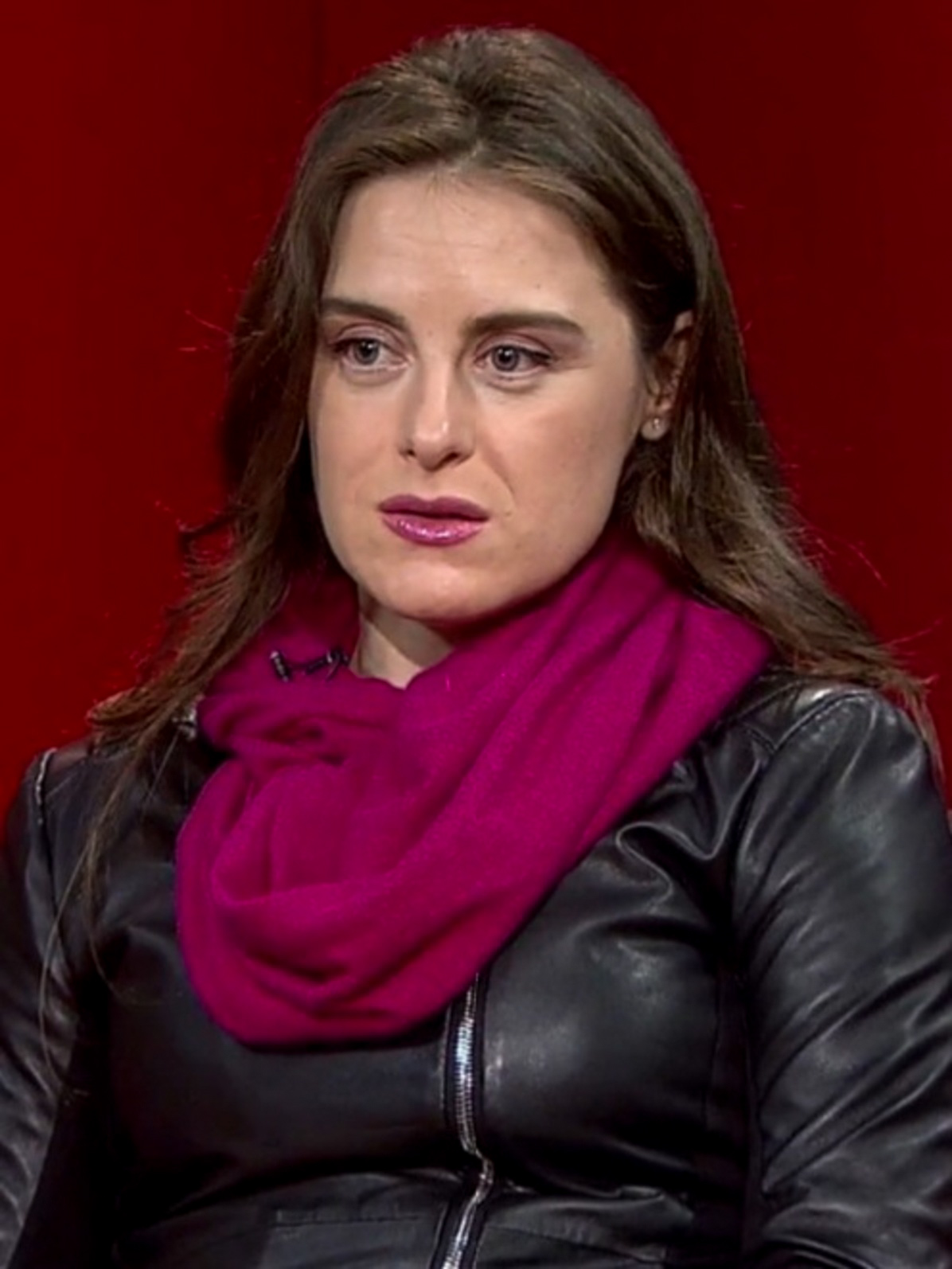
- Maestrini in 2016
- Born: Alessandra Maestrini; 17 May 1977 (age 49); Sorocaba, São Paulo, Brazil
- Occupation: Actress
- Years active: 1996–present

Alessandra Maestrini (Sorocaba, May 17, 1977) is a Brazilian actress and singer. She began her artistic career performing in acclaimed musicals and theater plays before gaining prominence on television, playing the Polish-Paranaense maid Bozena in the sitcom Toma Lá, Dá Cá (2007–09).

== Biography ==
Daughter of the American Emílio and the Brazilian Noêmia Maestrini, Alessandra was born in Sorocaba, São Paulo. From an early age, she showed a passion for music, literature, and art in general. As a child, she enjoyed creating scenes, writing, singing, dancing, drawing, and directing her friends. After moving to Rio de Janeiro, she took a summer course with Cláudia Jimenez and, at the age of 11, joined the Tablado theater school. She began studying singing at 15, later transitioning to opera lessons with the renowned teacher Vera do Canto e Mello. A year later, she performed with the company of Daniel Herz and Suzanna Krueger. At 17, she was awarded a theater and music scholarship to study in the United States at the University of Evansville in Indiana.

== Artistic career ==
In 1997, after returning to Brazil from her studies in the United States, Alessandra joined the cast of the award-winning musical As Malvadas, directed by Charles Möeller and Cláudio Botelho. From that point onward, her career flourished, with her work spanning theater, television, and cinema. She participated in other successful musicals, including O Abre Alas, Rent (as Maureen Johnson), Les Misérables (as Fantine), and Ópera do Malandro, also directed by Möeller and Botelho, where she portrayed Lúcia. She later took part in Ópera do Malandro em Concerto, a more compact version of the production.

Alessandra also collaborated with Lázaro Ramos and Drica Moraes in the play Mamãe Não Pode Saber and starred in O Casamento do Pequeno Burguês, earning a nomination for the Shell Award for Best Actress in 2004. Another notable production she appeared in was Utopia, an adaptation of Thomas More's 1516 classic.

In cinema, Alessandra worked with directors João Falcão (Fica Comigo Essa Noite), Miguel Falabella (Polaróides Urbanas), and Gleyson Spadetti (O Labirinto). On television, she appeared in the miniseries Chiquinha Gonzaga, the comedy Sob Nova Direção, and in the 2007 miniseries Amazônia: De Galvez a Chico Mendes, where she played Soledad, a singer in Maria Alonso's zarzuela company (portrayed by Christiane Torloni).

In 2007, Alessandra starred in the musical 7 - O Musical, created by Charles Möeller and Claudio Botelho, with a role written specifically for her. She portrayed Amélia, a betrayed woman seeking the help of a fortune teller, Carmen (played by Zezé Motta), to win back her husband. From 2007 to 2009, she captivated audiences as Bozena, the quirky Polish-Paranaense maid, in the comedy series Toma Lá Dá Cá. Her portrayal of Bozena, who humorously shared bizarre tales from her hometown of Pato Branco, Paraná, earned her honorary citizenship from the town.

While wrapping up Toma Lá Dá Cá, Alessandra debuted in Doce Deleite, directed by Marília Pêra, and began filming the soap opera Tempos Modernos, where she played the singer Ditta. In 2010, she recorded a cover of Cindy Lauper's True Colors for the international soundtrack of the soap opera Ti-Ti-Ti.

In 2012, Alessandra released her debut album, Drama ’n Jazz, through Som Livre. Shortly after, she recorded an English version of Chico Buarque's Eu Te Amo titled I Love You for the soundtrack of the soap opera Aquele Beijo. In 2014, she toured with Drama ’n Jazz and participated in the Nascente e Foz project, which combined poetry and music in major cities across Brazil. She also joined the ensemble cast of As Cantrizes, a musical production featuring renowned singer-actresses like Marisa Orth and Zezé Motta, held at São Paulo's Centro Cultural dos Correios.

Her television credits during this period include Correio Feminino (Fantástico), As Canalhas (GNT), and the feature film A Primeira Missa ou Tristes Tropeços, Enganos e Urucum, a comedy directed by Ana Carolina. Her performance as an indigenous character in the film earned her a nomination for Best Supporting Actress at the Prêmio Qualidade Brasil. In 2014, Alessandra also performed in Sexo e as Negas, a series by Miguel Falabella, and independently produced Yentl em Concerto, based on Isaac Bashevis Singer's Yentl – The Yeshiva Boy, featuring music immortalized by Barbra Streisand.

Continuing her Drama ’n Jazz shows in 2015, she was named Voice Ambassador of the Year by the Brazilian Society of Speech-Language Pathology and made a guest appearance on the series Mister Brau.

In 2016, Alessandra returned to As Cantrizes in Rio de Janeiro's Centro Cultural dos Correios and began preparing to star in Tempero Secreto (GNT), where she played Cecília, a former advertising executive who uses her marketing skills to launch a restaurant catering to foodies. That year, she also resumed her Drama ’n Jazz show at Teatro Porto Seguro and brought Yentl back to the stage in São Paulo.

== Personal life ==
In 2014, Alessandra came out as bisexual during an interview to Caras magazine, saying:

"A good part of my friends are artists, 'open-minded' like me. The press always treats me with the care and discretion I would hope for, and yet, I am exhausted. Exhausted from not feeling unconditionally loved. Exhausted from not allowing myself to love and be loved as I should and as I deserve. Exhausted from feeling rejected, and, of course, especially by myself. Exhausted from taking superficial stances on so many issues to 'avoid exposing myself.' I am not giving up my privacy. I am insisting on my identity."

In 2015, Alessandra participated in the Rucoming Out Summer event in London, which raised funds for NGOs that support LGBTQ individuals who have experienced bullying and are at risk of harm.

== Filmography ==
=== Television ===
Year	Title	Role
1999	Chiquinha Gonzaga	Marli
2004	A Diarista	Marli (Episódio "Aquele Com os Loucos")
2005	A Lua Me Disse	Jamile Ferreira
2005	Toma Lá Dá Cá (year-end special)	Bozena
2006	A Diarista	Vendedora
2007	Amazônia, de Galvez a Chico Mendes	Soledad
2007	Sob Nova Direção	Titi (episode: Dá um Tempo Garota)
2007–09	Toma Lá, Dá Cá	Bozena
2010	Tempos Modernos	Benedita Kunetscov Pina (Ditta)
2011	Batendo Ponto	Sofia (Episode "Como Não Procurar um Novo Emprego")
2012	Guerra dos Sexos	Alessandra do Lago
2013	Pé na Cova	Hérnia (Episode: "O Morto de Chinó")
2013	Correio Feminino	A Mulher Amada
2014	As Canalhas	Margô (Episode: "Margô, a Enfermeira")
2014	Sexo e as Negas	Gaudéria Brascia
2015	Mister Brau	Priscila
2016	Tempero Secreto	Cecília
2016	A Cara do Pai	Sílvia
2018	Show dos Famosos	Herself
2019	Eu, a vó e a boi	Rocha
2019	Samantha!	Carmem Vecino
2024	O Som e a Sílaba	Sarah Leighton

=== Film ===
Year	Title	Role
2006	Fica Comigo Esta Noite	Sensitive
2007	O Labirinto (short movie)	Laura
2008	Polaróides Urbanas	Ismênia
2009	Primeiro Ato	Eduarda
2009	Através da Tela (short movie)	Marta
2014	A Primeira Missa ou Tristes Tropeços, Enganos e Urucum	Sônia Duarte
2017	Duas de Mim	Valentina
2020	Ato	Ava

== Stage ==
Year	Title	Role
1997–98	As Malvadas	Laura
1999	Ó Abre Alas	Chiquinha Gonzaga
1999	Aí Vem O Dilúvio	Clementina
1999–00	Rent	Maureen
2002	Les Misérables	Fantine
2002	Mamãe Não Pode Saber	Mamãe/Dona Glória
2003	A Ópera Do Malandro	Lúcia
2004	O Casamento do Pequeno Burguês	Maria
2006	Utopia	
2007	A Ópera Do Malandro Em Concerto	Lúcia
2007–08	7 o Musical	Amélia
2009	Doce Deleite	Various characters
2011	New York City	Francine Evans
2013	New York City Turnê Nacional	Francine Evans
2014–16	Yentl em Concerto	Actress/Author/Director
2017	O Som e a Sílaba	Sarah Leighton
2023	Kafka e a Boneca Viajante	Brígida

== Discography ==
Year	Title
2012	Drama'n Jazz
2016	Yentl em Concerto

== Tour ==
Year	Title
2013–15	Drama'n Jazz
