= A Lua Me Disse =

- Genre: Telenovela
- Created by: Miguel Falabella; Maria Carmem Barbosa
- Directed by: Roberto Talma; Rogério Gomes
- Starring: Adriana Esteves; Wagner Moura; Marcos Pasquim; Zezé Polessa; Arlete Salles; Aracy Balabanian; Débora Bloch; Maurício Mattar; Patrycia Travassos; Natália Lage; Otávio Augusto; Isabel Fillardis; Pepita Rodríguez; Bete Coelho; Paulo Vilhena; Monique Alfradique; Mário Gomes
- Opening theme: "Lero, Lero"
- Composer: Erasmo Carlos
- Country of origin: Brazil
- Original language: Portuguese
- No. of episodes: 143

Production
- Running time: 45 minutes

Original release
- Network: TV Globo
- Release: 18 April – 30 September 2005

A Lua Me Disse (English: Once in a Blue Moon) is a 2005 Brazilian telenovela created by Miguel Falabella and Maria Carmem Barbosa, and starring Adriana Esteves and Wagner Moura.

== Plot ==
Heloísa (Adriana Esteves) is a baby-sitter hired to work at Regina's mansion. There, she meets Ricardo and Gustavo (Wagner Moura), who both fall in love with her. Ricardo reveals himself to Heloísa, but Gustavo represses his feelings.

Heloísa and Ricardo have an affair and she gets pregnant, but his spiteful mother Ester (Zezé Polessa) forbids him to marry the nanny. After a heated discussion with his mother, Ricardo drives off in his car and dies in a tragic accident.

Heloísa raises her child by herself, suffering retaliation by Ester. When Heloísa, Ester and Gustavo meet to clarify the past, he reveals he has always loved Heloísa, much to his mother's displeasure and despair. Heloisa and Gustavo know their love story is struggle to prevent anything from happening. How the many twists and turns of this story unfold... only time will tell.

== Cast ==
Actor/actress	Character
Adriana Esteves	Heloísa Queiroz
Zezé Polessa	Esther Bogari Prado
Wagner Moura	Gustavo Bogari Prado
Marcos Pasquim	Tadeu Martins Moraes
Arlete Salles	Ademilde Goldoni
Aracy Balabanian	Leontina Sá Marques
Débora Bloch	Maria Doroteia Sá Marques Dantas (Madô)
Maurício Mattar	Lúcio Dantas
Isabel Fillardis	Violeta da Mata
Natália Lage	Beatriz Nogueira Queiroz
Luiz Guilherme	José Carlos (Zé Bisonho)
Patrycia Travassos	Geórgia Bogari Lago
Monique Alfradique	Branca Sá Marques Benate
Paulo Vilhena	Adonias Goldoni
Zezeh Barbosa	Anastácia da Mata (Latoya)
Mary Sheyla	Jurema da Mata (Whitney)
Otávio Augusto	Alberto Queiroz
Pepita Rodrigues	Diva Queiroz
Chica Xavier	Dionísia da Mata
Mário Gomes	Agenor / Solano
Bete Coelho	Marisa Queiroz (Marisinha)
Maria Zilda Bethlem	Zelândia Fortunato
Cláudio Marzo	Ivan Lago
Stella Miranda	Adalgisa Goldoni
Bia Nunnes	Adail Goldoni
Giuseppe Oristanio	Armando Sá Marques
Beth Goulart	Elvira Sá Marques
Miguel Magno	Amoroso Valentín Pannacota (Dona Roma)
Elizângela	Assunta Velato
Luís Salém	Talarico Pereira
Maria Gladys	Naíde Alves
Diva Pacheco	Sulanca
José D'Artagnan Júnior	Adilson Goldoni
Guilhermina Guinle	Sílvia Bogari Lago
Juliana Baroni	Soraya Goldoni
Pedro Neschling	Murilo Queiroz (Murilinho)
Fernanda Rodrigues	Julieta Goldoni
Raoni Carneiro	Ramón Sá Marques
Rafael Paiva	Pedro Bogari Lago
Carol Machado	Vitza Vranska
Cássio Scapin	Samovar de Santa Luzia
Catarina Abdala	Dedeja
Ivan Cândido	Anselmo Gomes
Thelma Reston	Gôndola Goldoni
Jacqueline Laurence	Emelyne Junot (Memé)
Hugo Gross	Valdo Magalhães
Sylvia Massari	Meire de Souza (Morcega)
Adriano Garib	Dário Cotrim
Cristina Pereira	Roseta Castro Moura (Cigana Roseta)
Alexandre Zacchia	Nilson (Meia-Noite)
Simone Soares	Marta
Sandro Christopher	Dauro
Bumba	Índia Jaci
João Velho	Gibraltar Fortunato
Roberta Rodrigues	Zenóbia
Vergniaud Mendes	Joaquim Queiroz
Jorge de Sá	Jorge da Mata (Jorginho)
Mariana Vaz	Vilma
Guilherme Vieira	Artur Queiroz Bogari
Daniel Torres	Odorico
Renata Paschoal	Edna
Jorge Maya	Evaristo
Pia Manfroni	Taísa (Taisinha)

== Special guests ==
Actor/actress	Character
Maitê Proença	Maria Regina Sá Marques Benate
Frank Borges	Ricardo Bogari
Carlos Tufvesson	Himself
Ana Gloz	Dunya
