= Pato Branco =

Brazilian city

- Municipality
- Municipality of Pato Branco
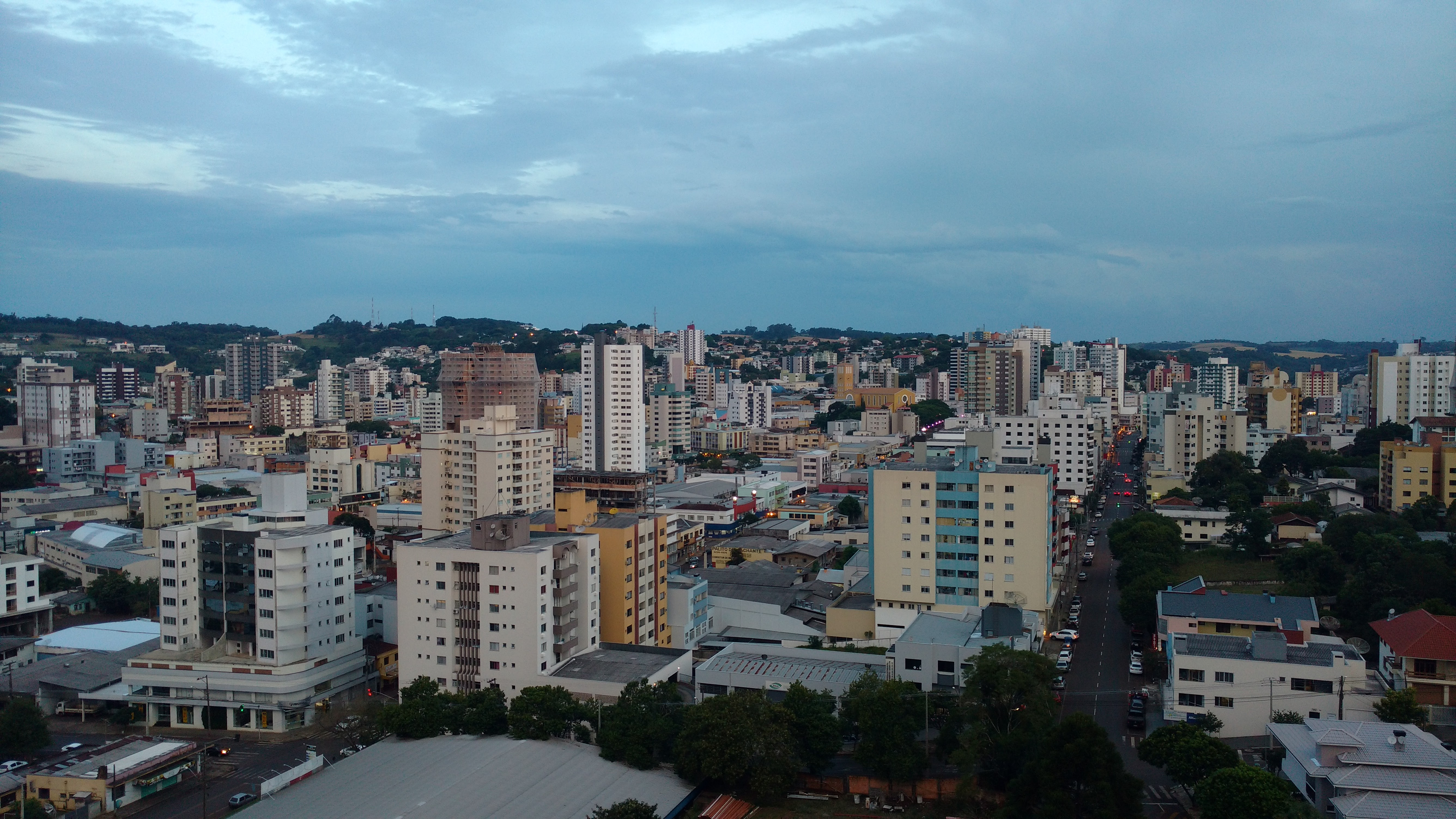
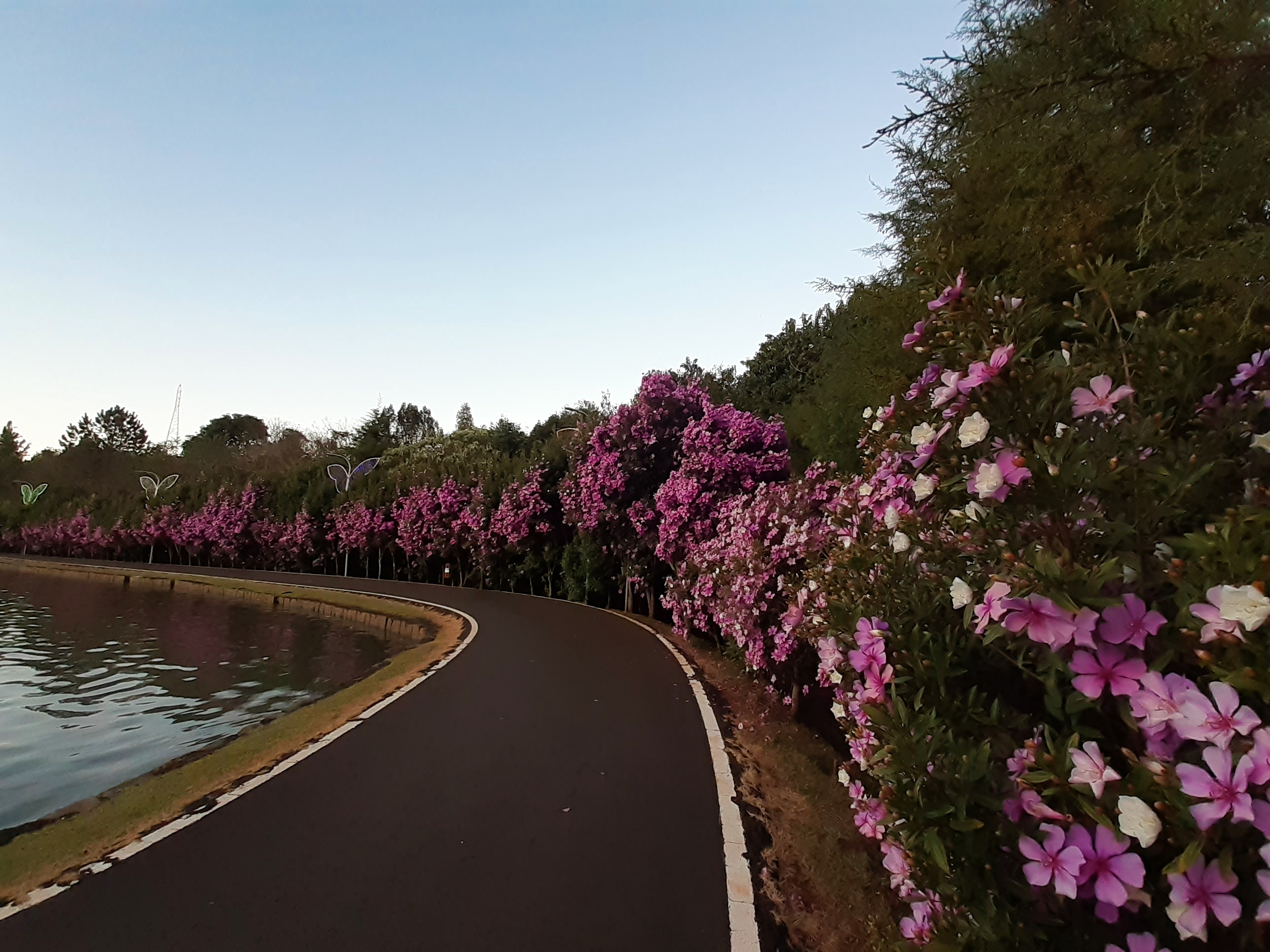
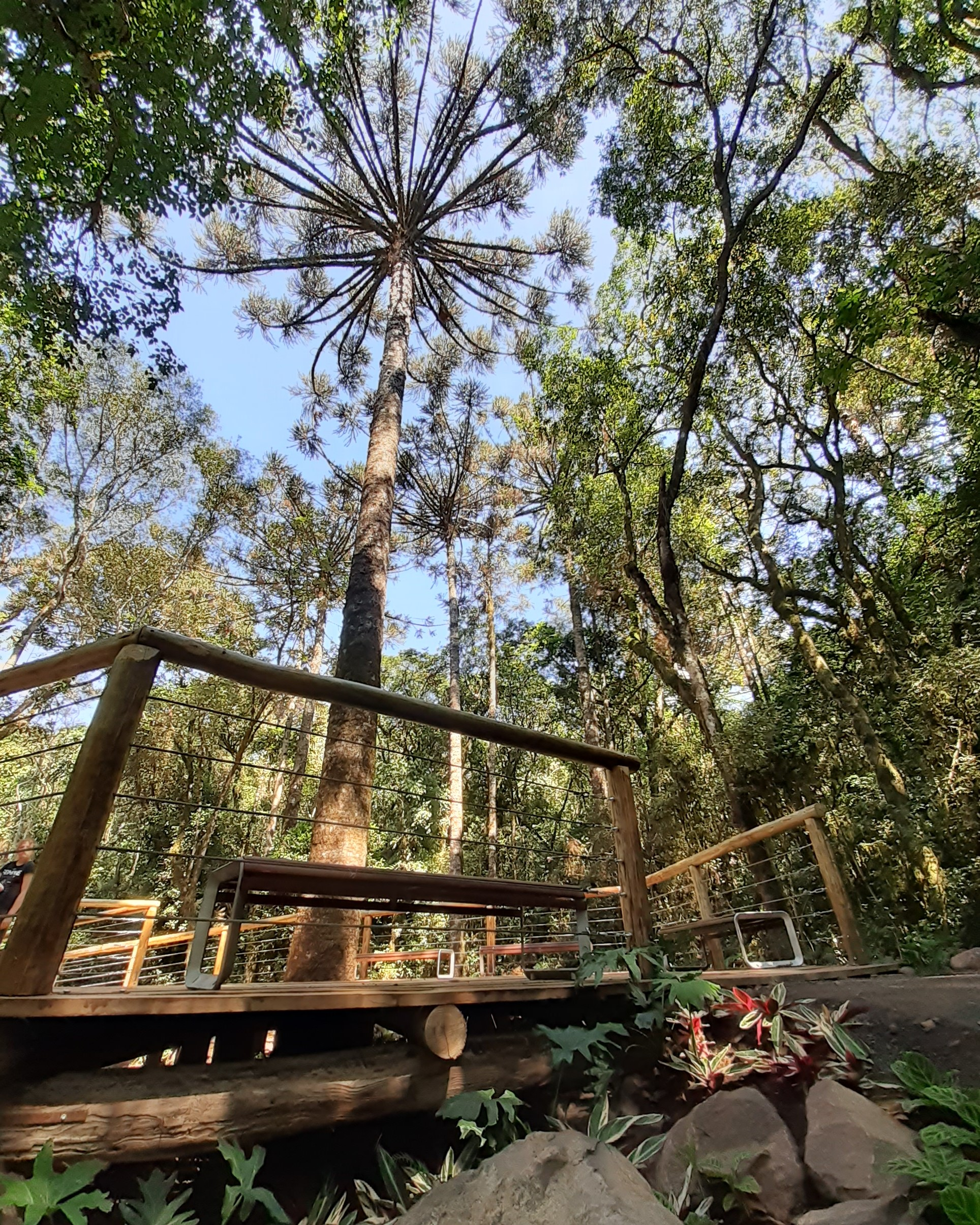
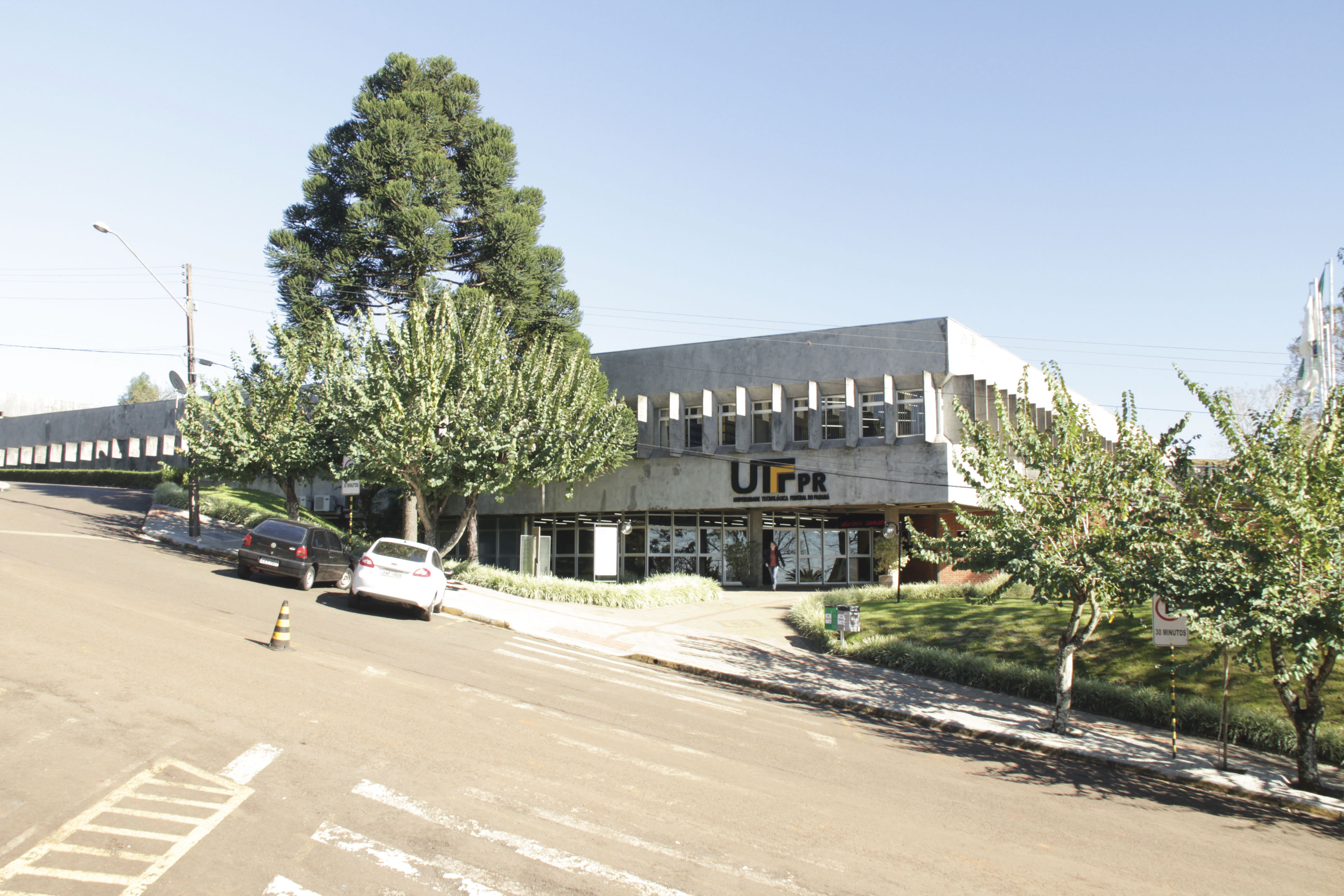
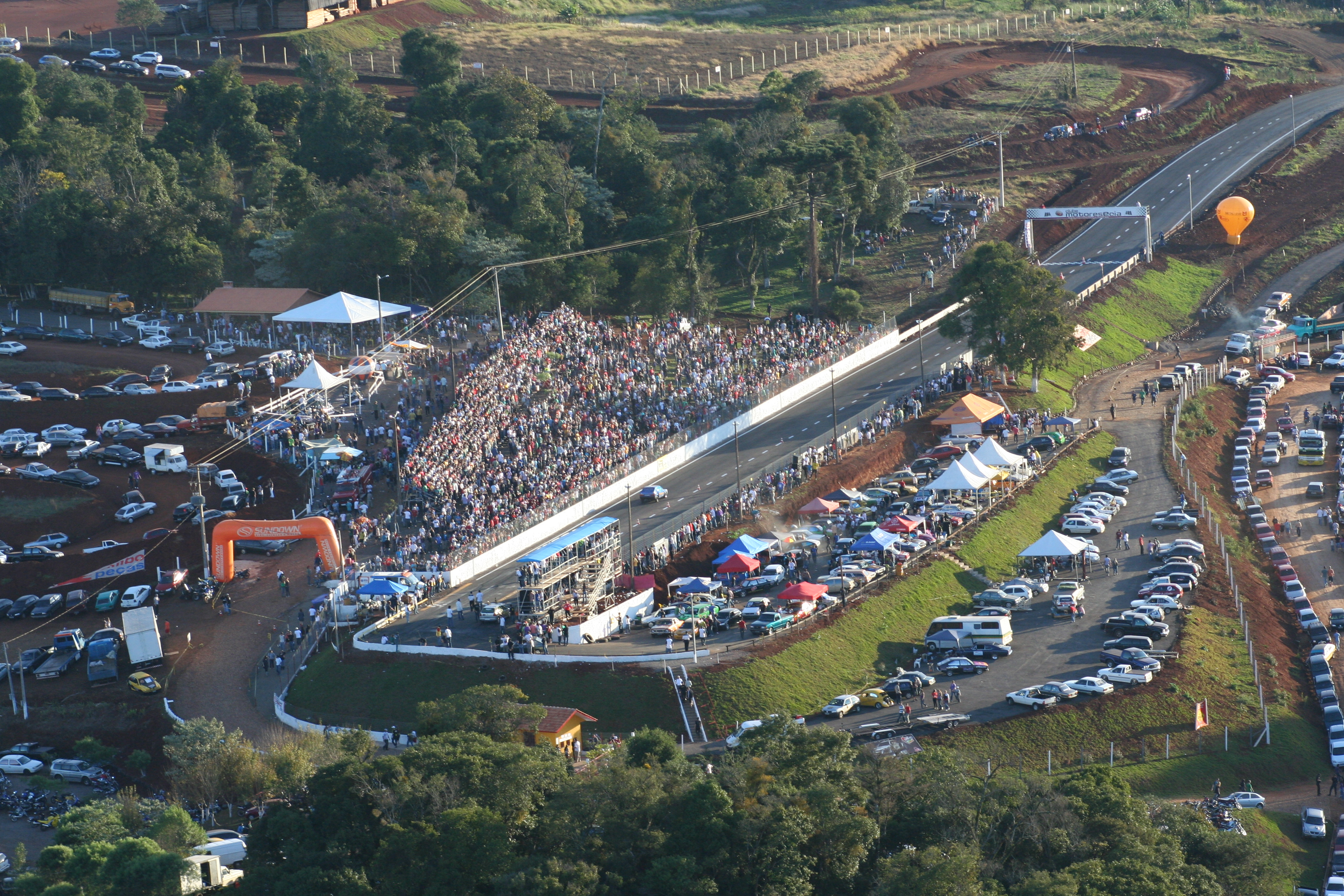
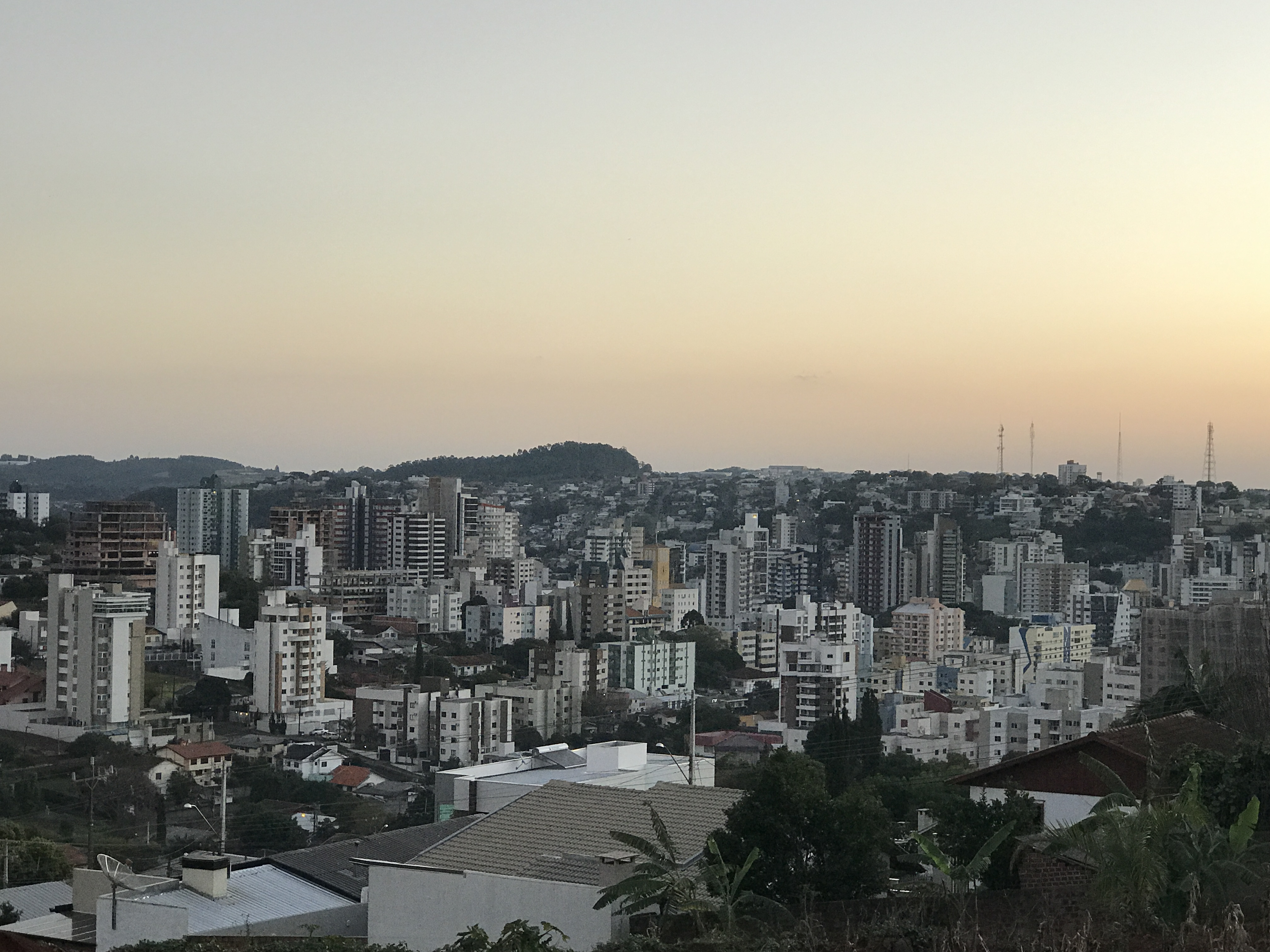

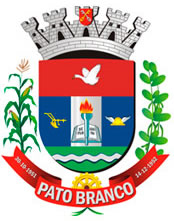
- Flag Coat of arms

- Location in Paraná

- Location in Brazil
- Coordinates: 25°12′46″S 50°58′40″W
- Country: Brazil
- Region: South
- State: Paraná
- Founded: 14 December 1952

Government
  - Mayor: Robson Cantu (PSD)

Area
  - Total: 539.087 km^{2} (208.143 sq mi)
- Elevation: 765 m (2,510 ft)

Population (2021 est.)
  - Total: 84,779
  - Density: 157.26/km^{2} (407.31/sq mi)
- Demonym: pato-branquense
- Time zone: UTC−3 (BRT)
- Postal code: 85500-000 to 85513-999
- HDI (2010): 0.782 – high
- Website: Official website

Pato Branco ("White Duck" in English) is a municipality in the state of Paraná in Brazil. The municipality covers 537,8 km^{2} (206.7 mi^{2}) and has a population of 83,843 (2020 IBGE estimate). Pato Branco started off as a village in 1942 and was given status as a city December 14, 1952. It has two private colleges, Faculdade Mater Dei and Faculdade de Pato Branco, and a campus of the Federal University of Technology - Paraná. The city has experienced a positive economic development throughout the last few years.

Pato Branco is located 760 meters above sea level and has a sub-tropical climate with warm summers and mild winters, morning frost being usual during the winter season. Occasional snowfall. There is no defined period of drought. The coldest month of the year is July with an average temperature of 14.2 °C (57.6 °F). January is the warmest month with an average of 22.5 °C (72.5 °F).

The current mayor (elected for 2021–2024) is Robson Cantu.

The city has a small commercial airport with flights to Curitiba (Juvenal Loureiro Cardoso Airport).

Former Brazil International footballer, Alexandre Pato is from the city. He notably played in Europe for the likes of Chelsea FC & AC Milan. Rogério Ceni, a notable goalkeeper that won the 2002 FIFA World Cup and as of 2022, he own the record of most goals scored by a goalkeeper, with 131 goals also was born in the city.

== Climate ==
According to the Köppen climate classification, Pato Branco is classified as oceanic climate (Köppen climate classification: Cfb), the annual temperature on summer is 28°C, on winter, the temperature reaches to 12°C, rarely below 5°C.

Climate data for Pato Branco, elevation 700 m (2,300 ft), (1979–2016)
Month	Jan	Feb	Mar	Apr	May	Jun	Jul	Aug	Sep	Oct	Nov	Dec	Year
Record high °C (°F)	34.0 (93.2)	35.0 (95.0)	36.6 (97.9)	32.6 (90.7)	29.8 (85.6)	27.8 (82.0)	28.8 (83.8)	32.0 (89.6)	35.2 (95.4)	35.6 (96.1)	36.7 (98.1)	36.6 (97.9)	36.7 (98.1)
Mean daily maximum °C (°F)	28.8 (83.8)	28.5 (83.3)	28.0 (82.4)	25.5 (77.9)	21.7 (71.1)	20.4 (68.7)	20.5 (68.9)	22.8 (73.0)	23.6 (74.5)	25.8 (78.4)	27.4 (81.3)	28.4 (83.1)	25.1 (77.2)
Daily mean °C (°F)	22.6 (72.7)	22.3 (72.1)	21.4 (70.5)	19.2 (66.6)	15.7 (60.3)	14.4 (57.9)	14.3 (57.7)	16.2 (61.2)	17.0 (62.6)	19.6 (67.3)	21.0 (69.8)	22.1 (71.8)	18.8 (65.9)
Mean daily minimum °C (°F)	18.1 (64.6)	18.2 (64.8)	17.0 (62.6)	14.9 (58.8)	11.7 (53.1)	10.5 (50.9)	10.0 (50.0)	11.4 (52.5)	12.3 (54.1)	14.8 (58.6)	16.0 (60.8)	17.4 (63.3)	14.4 (57.8)
Record low °C (°F)	9.8 (49.6)	8.0 (46.4)	3.6 (38.5)	0.8 (33.4)	−0.2 (31.6)	−3.8 (25.2)	−4.0 (24.8)	−3.5 (25.7)	−1.0 (30.2)	1.6 (34.9)	6.0 (42.8)	6.2 (43.2)	−4.0 (24.8)
Average precipitation mm (inches)	189.2 (7.45)	178.2 (7.02)	146.7 (5.78)	174.8 (6.88)	194.0 (7.64)	170.3 (6.70)	145.3 (5.72)	115.2 (4.54)	170.3 (6.70)	241.5 (9.51)	180.3 (7.10)	192.1 (7.56)	2,097.9 (82.6)
Average precipitation days (≥ 1.0 mm)	14	14	11	10	10	10	10	8	11	12	11	13	134
Average relative humidity (%)	75	78	75	76	78	78	74	68	69	71	69	73	74
Mean monthly sunshine hours	238.2	199.3	230.5	205.9	191.5	171.5	199.3	212.5	193.7	205.2	230.8	230.8	2,509.2
Source: IDR-Paraná

== Notable people ==
- Alexandre Pato (born 1989), footballer
- Rogério Ceni (born 1973), football manager and former goalkeeper
- Gabriel Casagrande (born 1994), racing driver
- Lucas Ostapiv (born 1997), taekwondo practitioner.
- Deltan Dallagnol (born 1980), politician.
- Bozena, a well known fictional character played by Alessandra Maestrini in the television sitcom Toma Lá, Dá Cá, is a maid always recounting bizarre stories from her home town, Pato Branco.
