= Miguel Magno =

Brazilian actor, director and author

- Born: 28 March 1951; São Paulo, São Paulo, Brazil
- Died: 17 August 2009 (aged 58); São Paulo, São Paulo, Brazil
- Occupation: Actor

Miguel Magno (28 March 1951 – 17 August 2009) was a Brazilian actor, director and author. He acted in theater and television. He was known for playing female roles.

== Theater ==
Magno played eleven different women characters in the play Quem tem medo de Itália Fausta (Who's Afraid of Itália Fausta?). He had a consistent theatrical career. In addition to acting he also was director and playwright. Furthermore, he co-founded the Teatro Orgânico Aldebarã, in the 1970s.

== Television ==
In addition to theater he participated in several telenovelas and sitcoms. One of his most striking characters was on A Lua me Disse, of Rede Globo, where he portrayed a crossdresser called Dona Roma. In 2009 Miguel Magno was invited by Miguel Falabella to play another woman: Dr. Perci of Toma Lá, Dá Cá.

== Death ==
The actor died on 17 August 2009, as a result of a cancer at the age of 58. He had been hospitalized since July in the Hospital Paulistano.

== Artistic career ==
=== Theater ===
- 1975 – A Cidade dos Artesãos, by Tatiana Belinky.
- 1978 – Do Outro Lado do Espelho, adaptation of Magno in partnership with Ricardo Almeida in Alice in Wonderland of Lewis Carroll
- 1979 – Souzalândia, by Antônio Francisco and Roberto Lage
- 1979 – Quem Tem Medo de Itália Fausta?, of his own in partnership with actor Ricardo Almeida. Under the direction of Roberto Lage and Celso Frateschi. The spectacle had plenty of pumping assemblies and since then, including the well known Cia. Baiana de Patifaria, which took the name of A Bofetada.
- 1992 – Porca Miséria, by Jandira Martini and Marcos Caruso, under the direction of. In the cast: Jandira Martini, Marcos Caruso, Myriam Muniz, Renato Consorte and Regina Galdino.
- 1995 – Cinco X Comédia
- 2004 – O Que Leva Bofetadas

=== Television ===
- 2009 – Toma Lá, Dá Cá .... Dra. Perci
- 2008 – Queridos Amigos .... Dorival
- 2007 – A Diarista .... Amintas Possolo / Marcelinho
- 2005 – A Lua Me Disse .... Dona Roma
- 2004 – A Diarista .... Amintas Possolo / Marcelinho
- 2003 – Os Normais .... dentist
- 2002 – Sabor da Paixão .... Aloisio
- 2001 – O Direito de Nascer .... commander
- 2001 – Estrela-Guia .... Romeu
- 1996 – Dona Anja .... Neco
- 1991 – Felicidade .... Lucas
- 1990 – A História de Ana Raio e Zé Trovão .... Billy
- 1989 – Top Model .... Marvin Gaye
- 1987 – Helena .... Rodolfo

== Movies ==
- 2006 – Irma Vap .... Camila's father
- 2002 – Lara .... Henrique

== Other websites ==
- Miguel Magno at IMDb
