= Jorge Lafond =

Brazilian actor (1952–2003)

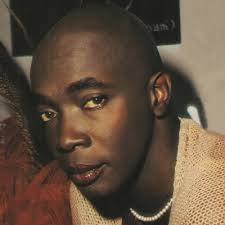
- Born: Jorge Luiz Souza Lima; 29 March 1952; Nilópolis, Rio de Janeiro, Brazil
- Died: 11 January 2003 (aged 50); São Paulo, Brazil
- Education: Federal University of the State of Rio de Janeiro; Universidade Castelo Branco
- Occupations: Actor, comedian, dancer, drag queen

Jorge Luiz Souza Lima, better known as Jorge Lafond (29 March 1952 – 11 January 2003), was a Brazilian actor, comedian, dancer, and drag queen. His main and most well known drag persona was that of Vera Verão.

== Biography ==
=== Early life ===
Lafond was born on 29 March 1952 in Nilópolis, outside of Rio de Janeiro. At 6 years old, Lafond was already aware that he was gay. In an interview to the magazine Raça, he said that "people said that to be gay was a very ugly thing, and that I had a messed up head. But the fear of my parents discovering [my sexuality] was so great that I had sought to walk the line and study a lot."

At 10 years old, he already started to work at a mechanic's office, and would work with his mother at an amusement park.

=== Dancing ===
Lafond studied ballet and African dance, going on to work with Mercedes Baptista. He graduated from the Federal University of the State of Rio de Janeiro with a degree in theatre. He also graduated with a degree in physical education from Universidade Castelo Branco.

Lafond worked for many cabarets in Rio de Janeiro, from those in Praça Mauá to those in Copacabana, and would open midnight shows at nightclubs such as Flórida, Escandinávia, and Barbarela and end the night at Kiss, in the Irajá neighborhood, at 5 in the morning.

=== Professional career ===
Lafond began his professional career as a dancer abroad at 17 years old, traveling throughout Europe and the United States with Haroldo Costa, who had a group that sought to showcase folklore, a group in which Lafond would be a part of for 10 years. The last name for his stage name, Lafond, came from actress Monique Lafond.

=== Success ===
Lafond eventually became a part of the group of dancers for Fantástico in 1974 and afterwards worked on the Jô Soares program Viva o Gordo. In 1983, he participated in the children's special Plunct, Plact, Zuuum alongside Maria Bethânia and Aretha. In 1987, he played Bob Bacall in the novela Sassaricando on Rede Globo, and afterwards, in 1990, was invited by Renato Aragão to participate in Os Trapalhões, already without the comedian Zacarias. There, he played the Divine Soldier, a cousin of Mussum, in the quartet led by Sargento Pincel. However, his career would be consolidated into the personality of Vera Verão, from the comedy A Praça é Nossa, by SBT, where he would remain for 10 years. He also participated in other films and novelas as well.

Along with his roles in film and television, Lafond also participated in various carnival blocs of the samba schools in Rio de Janeiro and São Paulo, often times scantily clad or entirely nude, as was the case when he participated with Imperatriz Leopoldinense. He also took part in Domingo Legal where he gained success with his comedic interviews at Piscinão de Ramos.

=== Controversies ===
In 2001, Lafond was invited to participate in an anti-STD campaign by the Ministry of Health, which was met with displeasure by activists from pro-LGBT organizations Grupo Gay da Bahia and Grupo de Gays Negros da Bahia, since they viewed Vera Verão's image being lent out as a homophobic stereotype to be pejorative.

There had been, throughout his career, controversies involving his homosexuality. In 1999, during the launch of his autobiography Vera Verão: Bofes & Babados, he threatened to release the names of personalities (including a famous football player) with whom he had relationships with.

On 10 November 2002, Lafond was invited to participate in the "Homen vs. Mulheres" segment on the program Domingo Legal, on SBT. Interpreting Vera Verão, Lafond became a member of the female side, but was taken out of the cast after a certain point, supposedly at the request of padre Marcelo Rossi, who had presented the program for several minutes. After the presentation, the production had asked insistently that Lafond would be able to return, since Rossi had already left. However, embarrassed and embittered by the situation, he did not return. In an interview with Quem, Rossi denied the incident and claimed he never discriminated against Lafond.

=== Death ===
On 17 November 2002, a week after the incident, Lafond was hospitalized in a grave state due to heart issues. At the outset, the doctors had diagnosed him with a hypertensive crisis. In the weeks after the incident, he would be in and out of the hospital repeatedly. He would be interned again at Hospital Sepaco, in the Vila Mariana neighborhood of São Paulo on 28 December. He began to suffer from kidney failure and started dialysis treatment. On 11 January 2003 at 1:40 in the morning, Lafond died due to a heart attack that followed the onset of multiple organ dysfunction syndrome. He was buried in Irajá Cemetery, in the North Zone of Rio. However, in 2018, it was reported that the remains of Lafond had disappeared from his tomb, as well as the jewels that had been buried with his body.

=== Posthumous tributes ===
Lafond's corpse was transferred to Rio de Janeiro to be buried at the Cemetery of Irajá as it was accompanied by around 5,000 people. The Military Police had to request reinforcements to help contain his fans who had brought banners and posters in hommage to Lafond, along with applause.

In 2003, the year he died, the G.R.E.S. Acadêmicos do Cubango created the Jorge Lafond Trophy to honor the highlights of Rio Carnival. The first school to earn the award was Unidos do Uraiti in 2005.

On 10 August 2005, representatives from gay rights groups, especially Quibanda-Dudu, made tribute to the then Minister of Culture, Gilberto Gil, as the most distinguished Afro-Brazilian sympathetic to gay liberation, and who himself would later reveal that he is bisexual, giving him a report about Black gay groups in Brazil containing biographies about notable Black gay figures, including Lafond and Madame Satã.

He was also paid tribute in 2010 during an episode of Eliana, on SBT, by drag queen Dimmy Kieer.

On 29 March 2023, Google created a Google Doodle celebrating what would have been Lafond's 71st birthday.

== Filmography ==
=== Television ===
Year	Title	Role
1981	Viva o Gordo	
1983	Plunct, Plact, Zuuum	Dancer
1983	Voltei pra Você	Zé dos Diamantes
1987	Sassaricando	Bruno Ramos Cursino (Bob Bacall)
1989	Kananga do Japão	Madame Satã
1990–91	Os Trapalhões	Divino
1992–02	A Praça é Nossa	Vera "Lúcia" Verão
1993	Adjeci Soares em Focus	Himself
2004	Meu Cunhado	Verônica

=== Film ===
Year	Title	Role
1982	Rio Babilônia	Dancer
1983	Bar Esperança	Luis
1984	Bete Balanço	Himself
1986	Rock Estrela	
1987	Leila Diniz	Waldeck
1988	Sonhei com Você	Nightclub presenter
