= Madame Satã (film) =

2002 film by Karim Aïnouz

- Theatrical release poster
- Directed by: Karim Aïnouz
- Written by: Karim Aïnouz; Marcelo Gomes; Sérgio Machado
- Produced by: Isabel Diegues; Mauricio Andrade Ramos; Walter Salles
- Starring: Lázaro Ramos; Marcélia Cartaxo; Flávio Bauraqui; Fellipe Marques; Renata Sorrah; Emiliano Queiroz; Ricardo Blat
- Cinematography: Walter Carvalho
- Edited by: Isabela Monteiro de Castro
- Music by: Sacha Amback; Marcos Suzano
- Production companies: VideoFilmes; Wild Bunch; Lumière; Dominant 7
- Distributed by: Lumière (Brazil); Mars Distribution (France)
- Release dates: 19 May 2002 (Cannes); 8 November 2002 (Brazil); 13 August 2003 (France)
- Running time: 105 minutes
- Countries: Brazil; France
- Language: Portuguese
- Budget: R$1 million
- Box office: R$1,155,180

Madame Satã is a 2002 biographical crime drama film co-written and directed by Karim Aïnouz. Shot in the neighborhoods of Lapa, Glória, Paquetá, and Centro in Rio de Janeiro, it stars Lázaro Ramos as drag performer Madame Satã and premiered in the Un Certain Regard section of the 2002 Cannes Film Festival.

== Cast ==
- Lázaro Ramos as João Francisco dos Santos / Madame Satã
- Marcélia Cartaxo as Laurita
- Flávio Bauraqui as Tabu
- Fellipe Marques as Renatinho
- Renata Sorrah as Vitória
- Emiliano Queiroz as Amador
- Giovana Barbosa as Firmina
- Ricardo Blat as José
- Guilherme Piva as Álvaro
- Marcelo Valle as chief of police
- Floriano Peixoto as Gregório
- Gero Camilo as Agapito
- Gláucio Gomes as fat man at Danúbio
- Orã Figueiredo as police officer
- Paula Damasceno as Danúbio's regular
