= Haroldo Barbosa =

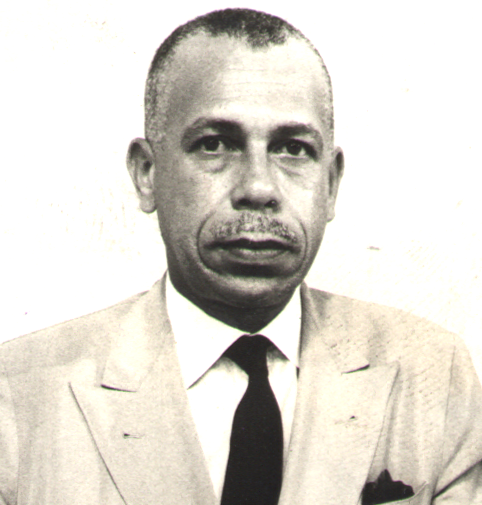

Background information
- Born: Roberto Carlos Braga; March 21, 1915; Rio de Janeiro
- Died: September 6, 1979 (aged 64) Rio de Janeiro
- Genres: MPB; rock and roll; soul; bossa nova; rhythm and blues
- Occupations: Singer-songwriter; journalist; composer; comedian
- Instruments: Vocals; guitar

Haroldo Barbosa (March 21, 1915 — September 6, 1979) was a Brazilian comedian, journalist, and composer.

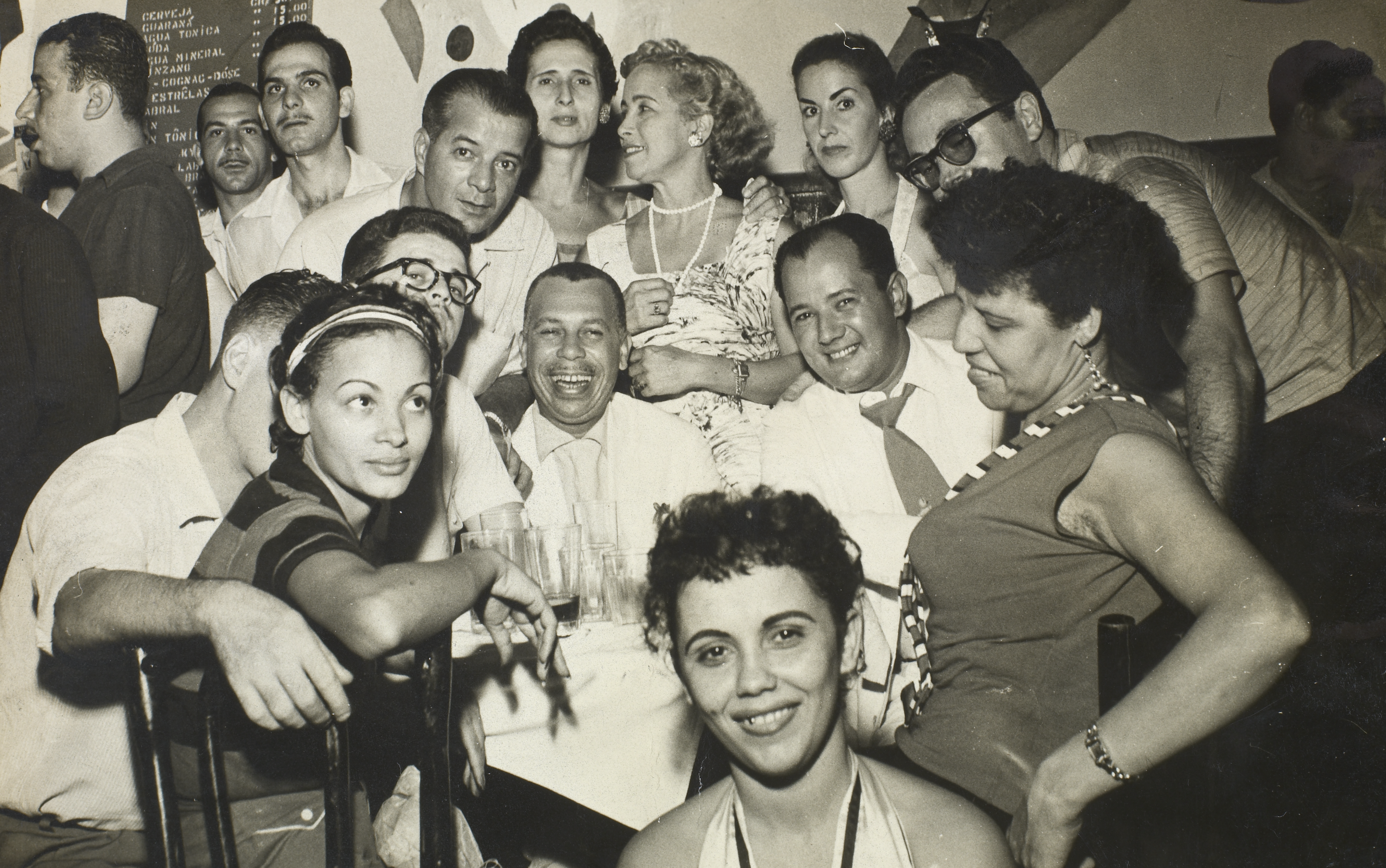
Haroldo Barbosa in 1957

== Biography ==
He was a childhood friend of Noel Rosa, Almirante, Braguinha, and Aracy de Almeida. During his more than forty years of artistic career, he performed more than three hundred Portuguese versions of foreign songs. He partnered with several composers and wrote plays and scripts for comic programs. Also, he was the creator of the Escolinha do Professor Raimundo.

In the 1940s, while working at Rádio Nacional and presenting the program Um Milhão de Melodias, he wrote for newspaper A Noite. His first comic texts also appeared at this time on radio programs such as Cavalcada da Alegria, Radio Tambarra, and Hora dos Amigos do Jazz.

He was a composer of several hits such as "Mesa de Bar", "Isso não se Aprende na Escola" and "De Conversa em Conversa". In addition to Rádio Nacional, he also worked at Rádio Tupi, where he wrote several radio soap operas, and at Rádio Mayrink Veiga where he created the Escolinha do Professor Raimundo, with Chico Anysio.

In television, Haroldo Barbosa debuted in 1957 on TV Rio, then on TV Excelsior and finally on Rede Globo.

== Private life ==
He was the father of writer and screenwriter Maria Carmem Barbosa. He died at the age of 64, of cardiac arrest, as a result of esophageal cancer.
