= Maria Carmem Barbosa =

Brazilian screenwriter and playwright (1947–2023)

- Born: 3 May 1947; Rio de Janeiro, Brazil
- Died: 22 September 2023 (aged 76); Rio de Janeiro, Brazil

Maria Carmem Barbosa (3 May 1947 – 22 September 2023) was a Brazilian screenwriter, television producer and playwright, whose career spanned over 40 years.

== Life and career ==
Born in Rio de Janeiro, Barbosa was the daughter of humorist, composer and writer Haroldo Barbosa. She started her career as a producer at Ensine Audiovisual, and later worked as a radio and television writer of educational, musical and comedy programs.

Barbosa made her screenwriting debut in 1983, co-writing an episode of the series Caso Especial. Often working in partnership with Miguel Falabella, she created a number of successful series and telenovelas, notably Lua Cheia de Amor, Olho no Olho, Sai de Baixo, Salsa e Merengue and Toma Lá, Dá Cá. She also wrote several stage dramas, film screenplays, and a collection of short stories and poems, A Louca de Louça.

Barbosa died of Alzheimer's disease complications on 22 September 2023, at the age of 76.
