= Carlos Tufvesson =

Brazilian fashion designer

Carlos Tufvesson is a fashion designer in Brazil. He attended Domus Academy, in Milan, Italy. In 2000, he opened a space in Ipanema: One side his atelier, the other a store front. In 2001, he released his first prêt-à-porter collection during the Semana Barra Shopping, a precursor event to Fashion Rio. In 2004, Tufvesson introduced his work internationally at the São Paulo Fashion Week.

== Activism ==
Tufvesson, who is openly gay, is well known for his activism in Brazil, especially for activities benefiting HIV/AIDS causes, but also for equal rights to access marriage, as it is administered and extended by the state. Architect André Piva is his life-partner, and both are well-recognized personalities, both by the LGBT community as well as the carioca society (i.e. the Who is who list in the city of Rio de Janeiro).
