= Gamebros =

- Genre: Crime drama
- Created by: Beto Ribeiro
- Starring: Leandro Mazzini; Julio Oliveira; Ana Paula Lopez; Felipe Hofstatter; Emmilio Moreira; Ceçary Goldschmidt; Marcelo Bechara; Bruno Soares
- Country of origin: Brazil
- Original language: Portuguese
- No. of seasons: 1
- No. of episodes: 6

Production
- Producers: Carla Albuquerque; Beto Ribeiro
- Production location: São Paulo
- Cinematography: Aline Juliet
- Production company: Medialand

Original release
- Network: PlayTV; Prime Box Brazil
- Release: May 20, 2018

Gamebros is a Brazilian crime drama television series produced by Medialand and directed by Beto Ribeiro. It stars Leandro Mazzini, Ana Paula Lopez and Bruno Soares and follows the story of a hacker who works at the Federal Police's Homicide Division.

== Plot ==
The hacker Heitor Grillo uses his technology knowledge in service of the Federal Police's Homicide Division led by the police officer Patricia. What no one knows is that while Hector helps the police in the real world he goes undercover at the Dark web as the alias 'Gamebros' to defend the internet from malicious virtual criminals.

== Cast ==
- Leandro Mazzini as Heitor
- Julio Oliveira as Gael
- Marcelo Bechara as Eduardo
- Ceçary Goldschmidt as Gilda
- Felipe Hofstatter as Roberto
- Ana Paula Lopez as Patricia
- Emmilio Moreira as Glauber
- Bruno Soares as Tiago
- Ricardo Ciciliano as Eder
