= Que Mundo é Esse? =

Travel documentary series

- Genre: Travel documentary
- Starring: André Fran; Felipe UFO; Michel Coeli; Rodrigo Cebrian
- Country of origin: Brazil
- Original language: Portuguese
- No. of seasons: 8
- No. of episodes: 37

Production
- Production company: BASE#1 Filmes

Original release
- Network: GloboNews
- Release: July 26, 2015 – present

Que Mundo é Esse? (transl. What kind of world is that?) is a Brazilian travel documentary television series that premiered on GloboNews on July 26, 2015. The series features André Fran, Felipe UFO, Michel Coeli and Rodrigo Cebrian who explores various countries, cultures and their social, political and economic issues.

== Episodes ==
=== Season 1: Kurdistan (2015) ===
In the first season, over the 15 days of travel, André Fran, Felipe UFO and Michel Coeli witnessed important issues in the history of the Kurds. The journey began in Turkey, which concentrates the largest Kurdish population, where the team witnessed a historic moment: the first time the Kurdish minority elected representatives to the Parliament in Ankara. In a campaign marked by tension, the result of the election led a multitude to the streets of the unofficial capital of the Turkish Kurdistan.

The trio leave Turkey towards Iraq. On the overland journey, they face two bureaucratic hours to leave Turkey and get into Iraq. They were the first Brazilians to enter Kurdistan without an Iraqi visa, following the rule that went in February 2015 and the initiative of the Honorary consul of Brazil in the region. Once in Iraq, they follow by car to Erbil, the capital of Iraqi Kurdistan, on a journey of 2 hours and a half. They opt for an alternate path, a little longer, to avoid the city of Mossul, one of the capitals of the so-called Islamic State.

André, Felipe and Michel are surprised by what they find in Erbil. The three were the only guests of a newly opened five-star hotel in Dohuk, a few kilometers from Mossul. The trio also visits a modern shopping center in the city and interview Dr. Safeen Sindi, the Brazilian consul in Kurdistan who talked about the situation in the area and the history of this virtually autonomous nation within Iraq.

=== Season 2: Africa (2016) ===
The season begins in Agbogbloshie, Ghana, the world's largest electronic waste site. The trio circulate through the landfill with environmental engineer Atiemo Sampson.

In Senegal, the series followed on a long journey to the boundaries of the Sahara Desert to meet the Great Green Wall, an initiative of 11 African countries to try to curb the advance of the desert.

The third episode focused on the combat of Ebola, chikungunya, and Zika in Africa. The trio interviewed Dr. Amadou Sall, an infectious disease physician.

In Kenya, they went to meet one of the rose-producing farms that are an important part of the economy and one of the country's major exports to Europe.

=== Season 3: United States (2016) ===
In the first episode, the team (now with the addition of Rodrigo Cebrian) divides into places with opposite proposals: Las Vegas, with all its ostentatious, and Black Rock Desert, where the Burning Man happens, a desert counter-culture festival that gathers 70000 people.

In the following episodes, the team visits Cleveland and Detroit to check the results of a crisis in capitalism and to show how this model is reinventing itself with initiatives that unite technology and activism to rebuild cities. They also go to the American South to dive into the everyday life of a typical pro-gun family of Louisiana, one of the states with more weapons in circulation and with a large number of firearm-related death.

=== Season 4: Mexico (2017) ===
André Fran, Felipe Ufo, Michel Coeli and Rodrigo Cebrian traveled to Mexico and approached the illegal crossing into the United States. In the first episode, they show how is the life of those who embark in search of the American dream and, after getting the work visa, become prevented from returning to their country. On the border between Tijuana and San Diego, families refind themselves having a wall between them. In the second episode, they travel to Ciudad Juárez and El Paso. In the third episode, the presenters go to Mexico City and present the place through the stories of corruption and wrestling. The season ends up making the opposite path and showing the Americans going to Mexico. First, in Los Algodones, where elderly Americans go in search of good quality medical care with lower costs. And then in Cancun, where Americans from all ages travel in search of alcohol, partying and fun.
