= O Brasil É aqui =

- Presented by: Mel Lisboa
- Country of origin: Brazil
- No. of seasons: 2
- No. of episodes: 26

Production
- Camera setup: Film; Multi-camera
- Running time: 30 minutes

Original release
- Network: GNT

O Brasil É Aqui is a Brazilian TV Show broadcast by GNT (Cable TV channel).

It has a total of 26 episodes of 30 minutes each.

In English the title means "Brazil Is Here"
