= Dario Maestrini =

- Born: 23 March 1886; Corciano, Italy
- Died: 28 October 1975 (aged 89); Arezzo, Italy
- Scientific career
- Fields: Medicine, Politics
- Workplaces: University of Rome

Dario Maestrini (23 March 1886 – 28 October 1975) was a 20th-century Italian physiologist and scientist. He was noted in the national scientific community for his research on heart, in particular for an early formulation of the Frank-Starling law, known as "Legge del cuore" or "Legge di Maestrini" by Italian doctors.

== Early life ==
Dario Maestrini was born on 23 March 1886 in Colle Umberto I, Corciano. His parents were Geremia Maestrini and Ester Monni. He was the first of three children.

At high school he focused on classical studies, and later enrolled at the University of Perugia to study veterinary medicine. During his time there he attended David Anxefeld's Institute of Physiology, and became his assistant. He graduated in 1912. After this first degree Dario Maestrini decided to enter the University of Pisa for Medicine and Surgery, where he graduated on 17 July 1914 with full marks.

== Medical career ==
On 14 November 1916 he obtained a post as lector in physiology. During the First World War he enrolled at the army as medical officer and he directed different military hospitals on the front line near the rivers Isonzo and Piave.

Between 1919 and 1924 he worked at the University of Rome where he began intense research activity, mainly on the heart. He highlighted some chemical and functional similarities between the muscle fiber cells of the ventricle of the heart and the skeletal flexor muscles. He discovered that in the walls of the atria there were less contractile fibers than elastic and fibrous tissue. This causes this part of the heart to dilate itself more than undergo hypertrophy. Through experiments on frogs' and snails' hearts, he demonstrated the direct relationship between the volume of the blood in the heart chambers and the contractile energy. As a result of his studies he formulated his "Legge del cuore", later known as Frank-Starling law.

From 1923 he decided to devote the rest of his career to hospital medicine. On 2 February 1925 he became chief physician of the Civil Hospital S. Antonio in Teramo, run by Congregazione di carità. Here Maestrini reorganized the hospital completely, creating a ward for people with tuberculosis. At the hospital he carried out clinical and scientific work, especially on cardiology. In 1934 a new Sanatorium was inaugurated in Teramo, and Maestrini became its first director, since he had shown great skills in phthisiology during his career. This hospital, named Alessandrini-Romualdi Sanatorium after donors of funds, was the first built for the cure of tuberculosis in the entire Abruzzo

In 1963 he introduced new and more suitable branches in the electrocardiogram practice to observe the function of the right heart. He named this "right electrocardiogram".

He took part in the Medical Academy of Rome and he was president of the science section of the Science Academy of Rome.

=== The Law of the Heart ===
Between 1914 and 1915, Maestrini took part in a big scientific debate. Through experiments on the heart of snails and with a series of 19 observations on frog's heart, he was able to demonstrate the direct relationship between the volume of blood contained in the heart cavities and the contractile energy of the heart and consequently how, within certain limits, the lengthening of the heart fibers, cause of the dilatation of the heart, corresponds to a greater contractile energy. So he formulated his "Law of the Heart", challenging with valid arguments those who saw the dilatation of the heart as a pathological event.

"Il cuore, quando venga sottoposto ad una tensione maggiore del normale, mediante un peso, è capace di fornire un lavoro meccanico maggiore."

— Dario Maestrini

Three years later, in 1918, Ernest Starling came to the same conclusions, publishing in London "The law of the heart". The publication was based on Maestrini's 1915 article L'influenza del peso sulla corrente d'azione e sul lavoro meccanico del muscolo cardiaco in Archivio di Farmacologia e Scienze Affini. The law became known as the Frank-Starling law after Starling, well-known internationally, and Otto Frank, although in Italy it was called "Maestrini-Starling law".

Dario Maestrini knew that until 1914 to 1915 Starling had always supported theories diametrically opposed to Maestrini's. From 1915, however, he changed hid view and strongly claimed the theses published in the Italian magazine by Maestrini. In 1923, on the advice of Silvestro Baglioni, director of the Institute of Physiology of the University of Rome, Maestrini wrote to Starling to claim priority for the discovery; Starling responded in a letter still kept by Maestrini's family, recognizing that the Italian scientist had first, in 1915, shown a direct relationship between the length of the cardiac fiber and its contractile strength. Despite this, the international scientific community adopted the name "Frank-Starling law". A brief note with title "The law of the heart" by Maestrini's adopted son, Fulvio Pezza, head of oncology in Novara, stating that Maestrini was the originator of the law as Starling himself had said, was published in The Lancet on 23 November 1974.

In the last months of his life Maestrini had the satisfaction of his priority being recognized, with the name "Maestrini-Starling Law" being proposed in The Lancet.

== Personal life ==
During his stay on the front line near the river Isonzo as an Italian soldier, Dario Maestrini met Giuseppina Bauzon, a woman of the small town of Romans d'Isonzo. After the end of the war they married and had a daughter, Anna Maria, who died at the age of 21.

On 1 January 1935 he became chief director of the Sanatorium Hospital of Gorizia. During his stay in this city he met and married the widow Caterina Bianchi and adopted her two children, Fulvio Pezza and Luisa Gobbi.

Dario Maestrini died on 28 October 1975 at the age of 89 in Arezzo, where he was buried. A care center for elderly people was named in his honor.

== Political engagement ==
Maestrini was involved in the anti-fascist movement. In 1943 he entered the National Liberation Committee (CLN) and he was part of "Pio Borri" brigade. He became Health and Hygiene Alderman of the municipality of Arezzo in the first junta made up after the liberation on behalf of Action Party, and in 1948 he was awarded the title of Patriot.

== Main writings ==
- L’influenza del peso sulla corrente d’azione e sul lavoro meccanico del muscolo cardiaco, Archivio di Farmacologia e Scienze Affini, XX, 1915
- Cardiografia ed elettrocardiografia:angiografia, Il Policlinico, Luigi Pozzi editore, Roma 1923
- Nuove vedute e nuove realtà in Cardiologia 1911-1967, Luigi Pozzi editore, Roma 1967

== Bibliography ==
- Allison Scardino Benzer - Women and the Great War: Feminity under fire in Italy (2010), Palgrave Macmillan US, pp. 141–147
- Marcello Mazzoni - Dario Maestrini e la legge del cuore, Storia di un mancato Premio Nobel (2005), in Notizie dalla Delfico XIX 1-2, Teramo, pp. 10–20
- Marcello Mazzoni - La legge del Cuore (2005), in Notizie dalla Delfico XIX 1-2, Teramo, pp. 21–22
- Fulvio Pezza - The law of the heart (1974), The Lancet n.2, p. 1272
