= Madame Satã =

Brazilian drag performer

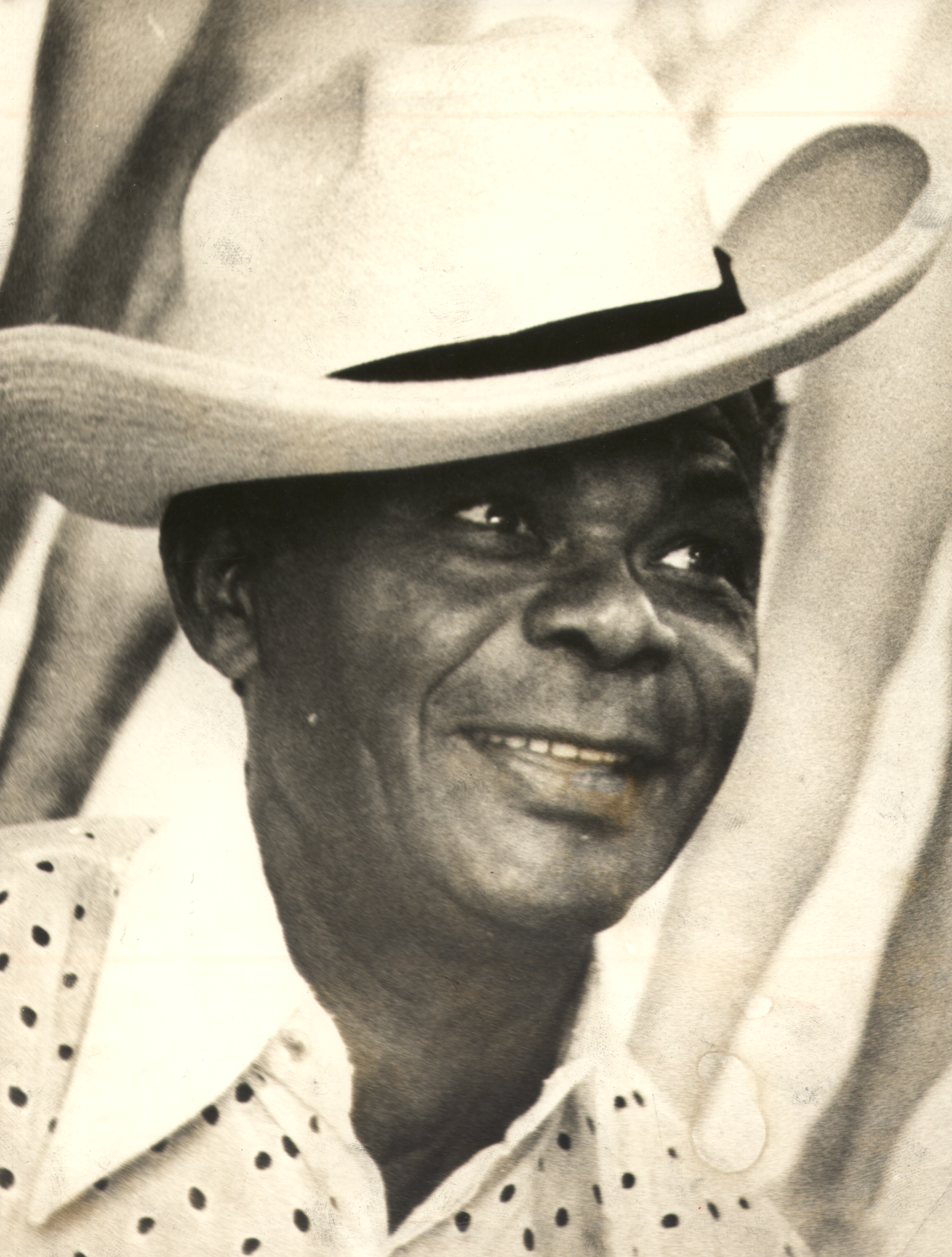
Madame Satã in 1972.

Madame Satã was the artistic name of João Francisco dos Santos (1900–1976), a drag performer and capoeirista from Brazil.

== Biography ==
He was born into a family of ex-slaves in the state of Pernambuco, Brazil. Having been convicted of murder, spending 27 years in prison, being a former gangster and father of 7, he found refuge in the dark Bohemian culture of Rio de Janeiro amid a lively world of pimps, prostitutes, deviants and samba composers.

João is most commemorated as a figure who fought to redefine himself while battling the stigmas of being a son of former black slaves, illiterate and homosexual. João is quoted for once saying "I was born an outlaw, that's how I'll live." In between his drag performances, his days as a hustler and his convictions of murder, his image as the legendary cabaret performance artist Madame Satã, meaning Madam Satan, having been influenced by the 1930s film by Cecil B. DeMille about a woman disguising herself as a notorious temptress to win back her errant husband. João's infamous character represented an expression of resistance in this post abolitionist era in Brazil where black people, prostitutes, drug users and addicts and other 'deviant' outcasts were deemed useless to society.

He was a skilled street fighter trained in the style of capoeira, and his battles against the police forces were legendary. He routinely fought barehanded against quartets of policemen armed with wooden clubs. A drunken João once resisted arrest by a 24-man platoon, leaving seven of the agents badly wounded, two with broken arms and two with split livers. The rest of the team opted to let him sleep it off rather than shooting him.

João Francisco dos Santos consequently became a living myth that supported and represented the values and lives of such outcasts of society as well as a revolutionary icon for the marginalized socially.

== Film adaptation ==
João Francisco dos Santos's story was told in the film Madame Satã, directed by Brazilian director Karim Aïnouz and was released in 2002. Lázaro Ramos plays the titular lead.

== Cultural impact ==
- Madame, a decades-old goth nightclub in São Paulo, was named after Madame Satã.
