= Toma Lá, Dá Cá =

Brazilian sitcom

Toma Lá, Dá Cá (English: Give-and-Take) is a Brazilian television sitcom created by Maria Carmem Barbosa and Miguel Falabella, which aired on Rede Globo from August 7, 2007, to April 13, 2010, over three seasons. It started as a year-end special, aired on December 29, 2005. The pilot episode spawned an eponymous series, starting August 7, 2007, replacing A Diarista and being replaced by Força-Tarefa. The series was directed by Cininha de Paula, who replaced Mauro Mendonça Filho, with the core director being Roberto Talma. At the time, many considered the series to be a kind of spiritual successor to Sai de Baixo, due to the fact that it also took place in a condominium and had Falabella and also Marisa Orth in the cast.

The series stars Falabella, Adriana Esteves, Orth, Diogo Vilela, Arlete Salles, Fernanda Souza, Stella Miranda and Alessandra Maestrini.

== Main cast ==
- Miguel Falabella as Mário Jorge Dassoin
- Adriana Esteves as Célia Regina "Celinha" Rocha Dassoin
- Marisa Orth as Rita Moreira
- Diogo Vilela as Arnaldo Moreira
- Arlete Salles as Copélia Rocha
- Alessandra Maestrini as Bozena
- Stella Miranda as Álvara Miranda
- Fernanda Souza as Isadora Dassoin
- George Sauma as Antônio Carlos "Tatalo" Dassoin
- Daniel Torres as Adônis Rocha Moreira
- Norma Bengell as Deise Coturno
- Ítalo Rossi as Ladir Miranda
- Miguel Magno as Dr. Perci Lambert

== Episodes ==
- Pilot (2005-2007.)

=== Season 1 (2007-2008.) ===
1. O dia em que a terra tremeu (The Day The Earth Shook)
2. A Mais Bela Casada (The Most Beautiful Bride)
3. Quando Paris Ilumina (When Paris Lights)
4. Boi Sonso, Marrada Certa (Dizzy Ox, Precise Hit)
5. A Língua não tem Osso (The Tongue has no Bone)
6. Espelho, espelho meu (Mirror, Mirror on the Wall)
7. Dolly Pancada Seca (Dolly Clap)
8. Boa Noite, seu Ladir (Good Evening, Mr. Ladir)
9. Freud já não explica mais (Freud Doesn't Explain Anymore)
10. Entrando pelo Cano (Flushed Away)
11. O Sequestro (The Kidnapping)
12. O "Y" do Problema (The "Y" Problem)
13. Atrás do Trio Elétrico (Behind the Electric Trio)
14. De Véu e Grinalda (From Wreath and Veil)
15. Onde Há Fumaça... (Where There is Smoke...)
16. Quem muito se Abaixa... (Who is much Lowers ...)
17. Sem Terra, Sem Grana e Sem Vergonha (No Land, No Money, No Shame)
18. Galinha que come Pedra (A Chicken that Eats Rocks)
19. Nem tudo é Realidade (Not Everything is Reality)
20. O Homem que veio Arrochar (The Man who Came Bursting)

=== Season 2 (2008-2009.) ===
1. Sempre cabe Mais Um (Always Have Space for One More) (First episode with Ladir)
2. Despedida de Casado (To Marry)
3. Quem Canta seus Males Espanta (He Who Sings Scares Away His Woes)
4. Uma Epidemia Politicamente Correta (A Politically Correct Epidemic)
5. Errados pra Cachorros (Wrong a Lot)
6. Em Pratos Limpos (Beautiful Plates)
7. Nosso Homem em Malibu (Our Man In Malibu)
8. Falando Grosso (Rough Talk) (First episode with Deise)
9. Os Bem Casados (Well Married)
10. Olha a Cobra! (Look to the Snake!)
11. Mãe só tem Uma (Only a Mother)
12. A Isadora o que é de Isadora (To Isadora what's from Isadora)
13. A Cinderela de Pato Branco (Pato Branco's Cinderella)
14. O Vestido que a Lady Deu (The Dress that Lady Gave)
15. A Greve da Carne (The Sex Strike)
16. A Classe Média vai ao Paraíso (The Middle Class goes to Paradise)
17. Dª Rita, a Solteira (Rita, the Bachelorette)
18. Sururu no Matagal (Scrub the Shrubs)
19. A Vida é uma Roleta (Life is a Roulette)
20. Na Boca do Sapo (At the Frog's Mouth)
21. A Mais Linda das Idades (The Most Beautiful of Ages)
22. A Importância de ser Copélia (Being Copélia)
23. Império sem Sentido (Senseless Empire)
24. Adivinhe quem vem para Mamar (Guess Who's Coming To Nurse)
25. Pior do que está Sempre pode Ficar (Worse than it is, Always will be)
26. O Buraco é mais Embaixo (The Hole's a Little Deeper)
27. Além da Arrebentação (Beyond the Crushing)
28. Vôo Cego (Blind Flight)
29. O Pecado Malha ao Lado (The Seven Days Workout)
30. É dos Carecas que elas gostam mais (They Always Liked the Bald Men)
31. Cara de Uma, Olho Junto da Outra (One's Face, the Other's Devil Eye)
32. A Malícia da Milícia (The Militia's Malice)
33. A Ilha do Dr. Ladir (The Island of Dr. Ladir)
34. A Terceira Praga do Egito (The Third Plague of Egypt)
35. Até que a Morte os Reúna (Until Death do us Gather)
36. A Grama do Vizinho (The Neighbor's Grass)
37. Milagre no Jambalaya (Miracle on Jambalaya) (Ladir's last physical appearance)

=== Season 3 (2009-2010.) ===
1. Cada Vez mais Pobres (Poorer People)
2. Por Causa da Maionese (Mayonnaise) (First episode with Dra. Percy)
3. A Bolsa ou a Vida (Give me the Purse!)
4. Cada Macaco no seu Galho (Stick to the Status Quo)
5. A Garota da Capa (The Girl on the Cover)
6. O Rouxinol do Jambalaya (Jambalaya's Songbird)
7. Não tem Pão, Comam Bolo (If There isn't Bread, Eat Cake!)
8. Doze Horas para Salvar seu Casamento (12 Hours to Save your Marriage)
9. Os Politicamente Esquecidos (Politically Forgotten)
10. A Tal da Metalinguagem (That Metalanguage Stuff)
11. Família é Quadrilha (Family Mafia)
12. A Alma Boa do Bloco H (The H Block's Pure Soul)
13. O Anel que tu me Deste (The Ring you Gave Me)
14. Entre Quatro Paredes (Trapped)
15. A Bicharada em Festa (Party of the Animals)
16. Respondez S'il Vous Plait (Dra. Percy's last appearance)
17. O Melhor Alfredo (The Best Alfredo)
18. Bodas de Latão (Iron Jubilee)
19. Álvara é um Show! (Álvara's Showtime!)
20. Tatalo, Mãos de Tesoura (Tatalo Scissorhands)
21. As Duas Faces de Celinha (Celinha's Other Faces)
22. Cada Qual Tem seu Preço (Everyone Has a Price)
23. A Foca no Armário (Seal in the Closet)
24. Eu Também Compro esta Mulher (I Also Buy this Woman)
25. A Gravidez das Coisas (The Pregnancy Of Things)
26. Asilo das Almas Aflitas - Parte 1 (Asylum for Troubled Souls - Part 1)
27. Asilo das Almas Aflitas - Parte 2 (Asylum for Troubled Souls - Part 2)
28. Safados na Pista (Rascals on the Trail)
29. Darwin se Equivocou (Darwin's Mistake) - Part 1
30. Darwin se Equivocou (Darwin's Mistake) - Part 2
31. A Guerra das Panelas (War of the Pans) (December 1, 2009)
32. Família Vende Tudo (Family Sells Everything) (December 8, 2009)
33. Revolução no Jambalaya (Jambalaya's Big Revolution) December 15, 2009
34. A Caminho das Estrelas (Heading for the Stars) (December 22, 2009 - April 13, 2010.) Series Finale
