= Miguel Falabella =

Brazilian actor and screenwriter (born 1956)

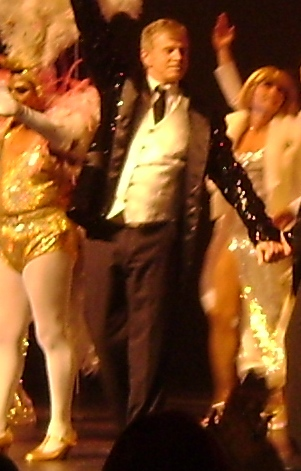
- Falabella in 2010
- Born: Miguel Falabella de Sousa Aguiar; October 10, 1956 (age 69); Rio de Janeiro, Brazil
- Years active: 1981-present
- Known for: Long-time host of Vídeo Show

Miguel Falabella (born October 10, 1956, Rio de Janeiro) is a Brazilian actor, presenter, screenwriter, voice actor, film maker, theater actor, producer, writer and director. He is known, among other works, for playing Caco Antibes in the sitcom Sai de Baixo and for presenting Video Show for over 15 years. He was a carnival performer for the Império da Tijuca and Rocinha samba schools.

== Career ==
As a child, when he lived on Ilha do Governador, Falabella watched the musical Hello Dolly, starring Bibi Ferreira, and was enchanted by the world of dramaturgy. He made his television debut in 1982, in the program Caso Verdade, in the episode "Jam and Jim", where he played the title character. Soon after, he participated in his first soap opera, Sol de Verão, by Manoel Carlos, as a doctor called Romeu. He achieved success in 1986, playing Miro, in the remake Selva de Pedra, by Janete Clair. He debuted as a television presenter on the Video Show program in August 1987. It was so successful that Miguel remained in front of the program until January 2002, when he was replaced by Márcio Garcia, and the latter by André Marques.

He is a very active artist in theater and television. On stage, in addition to national musicals, he usually brings Broadway to Brazil. He acted in the great success Loiro, Alto, Solteiro, Procura and also wrote A Partilha, a play that was later adapted to film (directed by Daniel Filho).

Falabella frequently performs poetry and writing. He participated in some poetry CDs, and wrote some books. He was also the author of several chronicles published in newspapers and magazines, his most famous collection was entitled Coração Urbano.

He participated in the comedy series Toma Lá, Dá Cá, also on Globo, as former surfer Mário Jorge, for which he wrote the script, alongside his friend Maria Carmem Barbosa. The series was canceled in December 2009, the reason was strategy, according to Falabella himself, who said "I think it's good to leave at the peak".

With his translation and direction, the musical Hairspray played in theaters that year.

In 2010, he debuted on TV the series A Vida Alheia, without an audience and recorded in external locations. According to Miguel, the purpose of the program itself was not to be a humor attraction, but rather a portrayal of the hard life of the paparazzi, the photo reporters of the so-called gossip magazines.

In 2013, the series Pé na Cova premiered, in which he plays Ruço, the main character, and also wrote the script for the series. According to Miguel, he thinks that "from 50 onwards, death becomes a reality". In February of the same year, he declared that Pé na Cova should be his last TV performance, and that he also intends to leave the theater, as he prefers to write.

In 2014, he made the series Sexo e as Nêga, a Sex and the City parody that portrays the life of for friends from Rio de Janeiro's suburb neighborhood, Cordovil.

In 2017, in addition to resuming his character Caco Antibes, successful in Sai de Baixo, this time at Escola do Professor Raimundo, the actor has been working on a novel about his family, Sagrado Coração, with his great-grandfather, who left Italy, as the initial character, more precisely the region of Basilicata, and embarked by mistake for Brazil. In the same year, he was a juror for the segment "Show dos Famosos" on Domingão do Faustão alongside Cláudia Raia and Silvio de Abreu, and participated in the series Cidade Proibida, playing the social columnist Leon Mercier. In addition, since 2016, he has presented the "Memória Nacional" segment within Video Show, remembering deceased artists and with outstanding works on Rede Globo.

In 2018, Miguel was honored at the carioca carnival by the samba school Unidos da Tijuca, neighbor and co-sister of Império da Tijuca, the school for which he was a carnival designer in the 1990s.

== Personal life ==
Falabella's family has Portuguese, Italian, Spanish, Austrian, German and Swiss ancestry. He is father of two sons, Cassiano and Theo.

In an interview with Serafina magazine, in February 2013, Falabella discussed his sexual orientation, which was frequently speculated by the media:

"I've been married my whole life. I kiss a lot on the lips. If I wasn't happy in that area, I wouldn't be the artist I am. I've always been honest, consistent. I've never done numbers or posed for anything else. I've never hidden what I was to no one. I don't need to go out waving flags at the Gay Parade. There are other ways of telling people that this is all a bunch of nonsense, that everyone dies in the end. So let's be happy with who we choose to be happy with."

== Selected filmography ==
- Amor com Amor se Paga (1984)
- Kiss of the Spider Woman (1985)
- Selva de Pedra (1986)
- The Lady from the Shanghai Cinema (1988)
- A Viagem (1994)
- Sai de Baixo (1996)
- Redeemer (2004)
- Toma Lá, Dá Cá (2007)
- Três Graças (2025)
- Pablo & Luisão (2025)
