= Patricya Travassos =

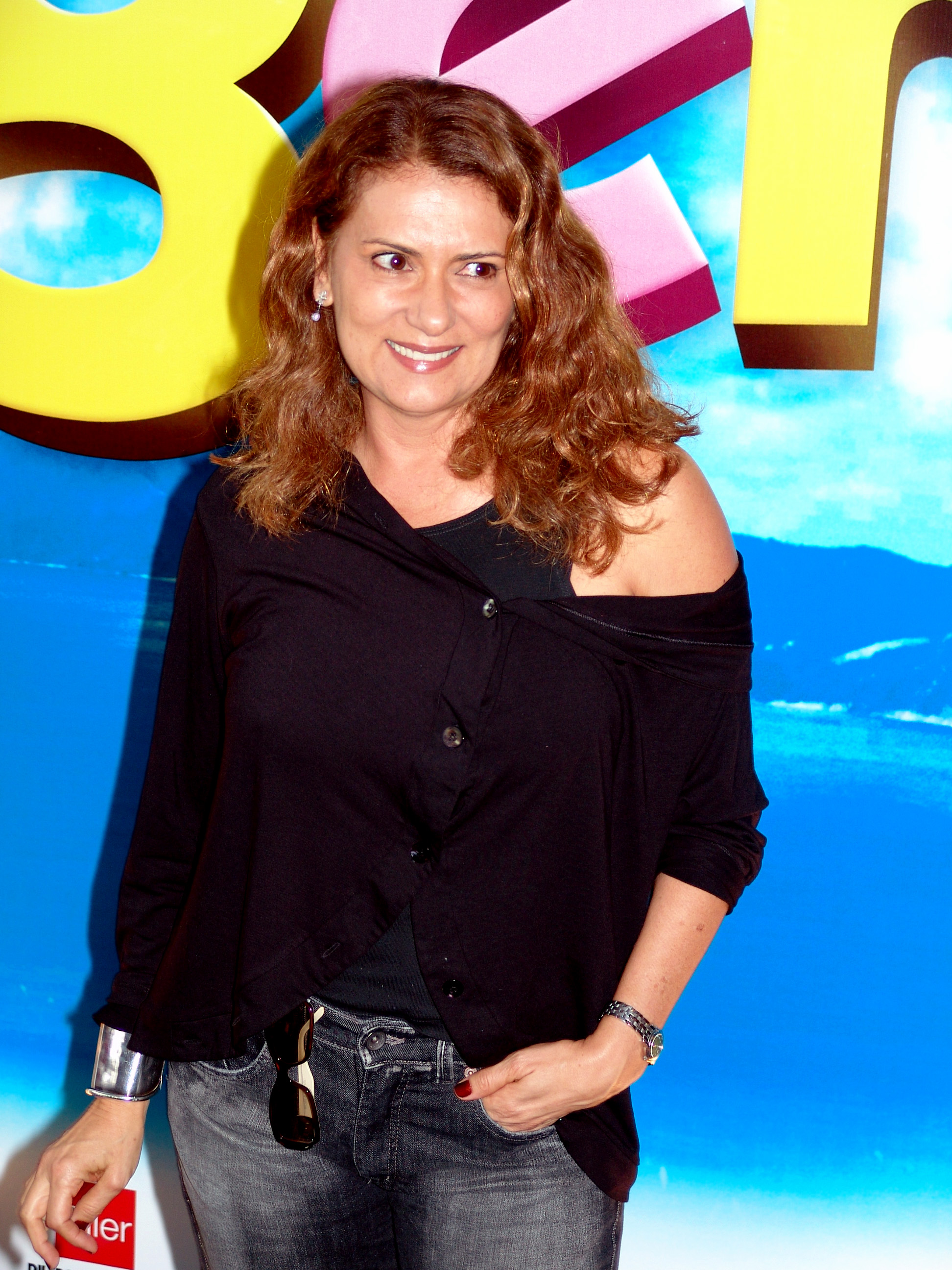
- Born: Patrícia de Resende Travassos; 1 May 1955 (age 71); Rio de Janeiro, Brazil
- Occupations: Actress, presenter, screenwriter, writer, composer
- Spouses: Evandro Mesquita (m. 1980; div. 1987) Liminha (m. 2005; div. 2009)

Patrícia de Resende Travassos (born 1 May 1955), better known as Patricya Travassos, is a Brazilian actress, presenter, screenwriter, writer, and composer.

== Biography ==
Travessos was born on 1 May 1955 in Rio de Janeiro. She began her career in the 1970s as part of the theatre troupe Asdrúbal Trouxe o Trombone, alongside Regina Casé, Luís Fernando Guimarães, Perfeito Fortuna, and Evandro Mesquita, creating and acting in works such as Trate-me Leão and Aquela Coisa Toda. In the 1980s, she composed songs and directed specials for Blitz and for other groups and singers, such as the band Sempre Livre. She became part of Rede Globo in 1980 and, over the course of 4 years, created and wrote Armação Ilimitada, along with screenwriting on TV Pirata, Delegacia de Mulheres, Vida ao Vivo Show, the mini-series Sex Appeal and the telenovela Olho no Olho.

As an actress, she acted in various telenovelas by Rede Globo such as Brega & Chique (1987), Bebê a Bordo (1988), Vamp (1991), A Próxima Vítima (1995), and As Filhas da Mãe (2001). With theatre pieces, she has performed in A Partilha, by Miguel Falabella; Capital Estrangeiro, by Silvio de Abreu; No Escurinho do Cinema, by Luís Carlos Góes; and 5 x Comédia. In film, she participated in screenplays for films such as Lua de Cristal (1990), by Tizuka Yamasaki; O Mentiroso (1988), by Werner Schünemann, and the winner of the Festival de Brasília; Lili, a Estrela do Crime (1988), by Lui Farias; A Hora Mágica (1998), by Guilherme de Almeida Prado; and Xuxa Gêmeas (2006), by Jorge Fernando. Her first book was Esse Sexo é Feminino, coedited by publishers Símbolo and O Nome da Rosa. From 1997 to 2013, she presented the program Alternativa Saúde, on GNT alongside Cynthia Howlett, and was a columnist on the magazine Marie Claire. In April 2007, Travassos accepted the invite by author Tiago Santiago to participate in Caminhos do Coração, a new telenovela on Record, which made its debut on 28 August. Travassos also played Irma Mayer, along with other major characters such as Aristóteles (André D'Biase), Platão (Ricardo Petraglia), and her brother Sócrates (Walmor Chagas). Before Travassos, Marília Pêra also was invited to play the role, but decided to renew her contract with Rede Globo. In 2017, she took part in two films, Mulheres Alteradas by Luis Pereira and Incompatível by Johnny Araújo. On TV, she participated in the final episode Cidade Invisível on TV Brasil, which was an unreleased series on Canal Viva, about the troupe Asdrúbal Trouxe o Trombone. She also recorded the third season of the series Multishow, Treme Treme as a syndicated series in 2018.

== Personal life ==
Travassos, early on, changed her first name from Patrícia to Patricya for its numerology. In 1977, she began dating actor and singer Evandro Mesquita, a friend whom she married in 1980. They separated in 1987. Soon after, she dated director Euclydes Marinho for two years, with whom she had a son, Nicolau, in 1989. In 1995, she began a to date Polish producer Diduche Worcman, whom she married in 1997. He died in 2004. In 2005, she began to date and would later marry musical producer Liminha, staying with him until 2009.

== Filmography ==
=== Television ===
Year	Title	Role	Notes
1985	Armação Ilimitada	Witch	Episode: "A Bruxa"
1987	Brega & Chique	Mercedes Pinto	
1988	Bebê a Bordo	Ester Ladeira	
1990	Delegacia de Mulheres	Tânia	Episode: "Por um Triz"
1991	Amazônia	Francisca	
1991	Vamp	Mary Matoso	
1993	Olho no Olho	Maria Eduarda Fragoso (Duda)	
1994	Você Decide	Dr. Margot	Episodes: "O Transplante"
1995	A Próxima Vítima	Solange Lopes	
1996	Vira Lata	Penélope Rocha (Pê)	
1997–13	Alternativa Saúde	Presenter	
1998–99	Você Decide	Sueli / Cátia / Maria Paula / Carolina	Episodes: "Seios Que Toquei", "Meus Dois Fantasmas", "Numa Sexta-Feira 13: Part 1 e 2", and "Oscar Matriz e Filial"
2001	As Filhas da Mãe	Milagros Quintana	
2002	Os Normais	Simone	Episode: "Questionamentos Normais"
2003	A Grande Família	Enfª. Neide	Episode: "Seu Floriano Amanheceu Pegando Fogo"
2003	Os Normais	Dr. Neide Arruda	Episode: "Sonho de Uma Noite de Serão"
2003	Sítio do Picapau Amarelo	Serena	Episode: "Rapunzel"
2004	Sob Nova Direção	Ácassia	Episode: "Fast Food é o Que Interessa"
2004; 2006	A Diarista	Perua / Verna Camarotto / Sargentona / Luíza	Episodes: "Sua Excelência, o Ócio", "Baixa Costura", "Aquele do Quartel", "Aquele da Pressa"
2005	A Lua Me Disse	Geórgia Bogari	
2006–07	Minha Nada Mole Vida	Lívia	
2007	Caminhos do Coração	Irma Mayer	
2008	Os Mutantes	Irma Mayer	
2010	Ribeirão do Tempo	Clorís Fortunato	
2013	Simplesmente Nova Família Trapo	Dona Gertrudes	Year end special
2014	Milagres de Jesus	Dália	Episode: "A Cura do Filho do Oficial do Rei"
2014	Vitória	Valéria Schiller	
2015	Acredita na Peruca	Glorinha Vandervilha	Episode: "Lembra Do Meu Nome", "Os 7 Pecados De Glorinha"
2016	Lili, a Ex	Teresa Motta (Tetê)	Episode: "A Ex-Sogra"
2016	A Secretária do Presidente	Madame Clecí	
2017	Cidade Invisível	Janete	
2017	Asdrúbal Trouxe o Trombone	Herself	Documentary
2018–19	Treme Treme	Maura Moura (Síndica)[nota 1]	Seasons 3–4
2018	A Vila	Geralda	Season 2
2018	Espelho da Vida	Edméia Ferraz (Grace)	
2018	Espelho da Vida	Maria da Graça Almeida (Graça)	
2019–presente	O Dono do Lar	Doralice	

=== Internet ===
Year	Title	Role
2015–16	PatCanal	Presenter

=== Film ===
Year	Film	Role	Notes
1983	O Segredo da Múmia	Victim	
1989	Lili, a Estrela do Crime	Rita	
1990	Lua de Cristal		Screenwriter
1998	O Mentiroso	Carolina	
1999	A Hora Mágica	Josefa Tibério	
2006	Xuxa Gêmeas	Receptionist at O Dourado	Screenwriter
2007	Podecrer!	João's mom	
2014	A Farra do Circo	Herself	Documentary
2016	Minha Mãe É Uma Peça 2	Lúcia Helena Amaral	
2017	TOC: Transtornada Obsessiva Compulsiva	Lídia Khalil	
2018	Mulheres Alteradas	Ana Gomes	
2019	Minha Mãe é uma Peça 3	Lúcia Helena Amaral	
2022	Incompatível	Helena	
2022	Esposa de Aluguel	Carlota Pereira	

== Theatre ==
Year	Title	Role
1977	Trate-me Leão	Regina
1980	Aquela Coisa Toda	
1994	Capital Estrangeiro	
1997	No Escurinho do Cinema	Vilma
2000–02	5X comédia	Various roles
2003–04	Síndromes, Loucos como Nós	Various roles
2008–09	Monstra	
2012–14	A Partilha	Selma
2018–19	Aérea	Flight attendant

== Technical record ==
=== As author ===
==== Theatre ====
Year	Title
1981	A Incrível História de Nemias Demutcha
1985	Entre Hoje e Amanhã

==== Television ====
Year	Title
1985–88	Armação ilimitada
1990–92	TV Pirata
1990	Delegacia de Mulheres
1993	Sex Appeal
1993	Olho no Olho
1998–99	Vida ao Vivo Show

=== Bibliography ===
- Esse Sexo É Feminino (2001)
- Alternativas de A a Z (2003)
- Monstra e Outras Crônicas da Revista Marie Claire (2006)

== Discography ==
Compositions
Year	Song	Artist	Notes
1982	"Volta ao Mundo"	BLITZ	with Evandro Mesquita, Chacal
1983	"Beth frígida"	BLITZ	with Antônio Pedro, Ricardo Barreto, Evandro Mesquita
1984	"Ego Trip"	BLITZ	with Evandro Mesquita, Antônio Pedro, Ricardo Barreto
1984	"Eu sou free"	Sempre Livre	with Ruban
1984	"Mapa da Mina"	Sempre Livre	with Ruban
1984	"Garota Normal"	Sempre Livre	with Ruban
1984	"Esse seu Jeito Sexy de Ser"	Sempre Livre	with Evandro Mesquita e Lui
1984	"Noite de Estréia"	Rádio Táxi	with Wander Taffo
1984	"Liberal"	Roupa Nova	with Ruban
1985	"Dançando na Contra Mão"	Roupa Nova	with Ruban
1986	"Cinderela"	Ruban	with Ruban
1986	"Pagã"	Tânia Alves	with Ovelar, Baquero
1986	"17 Graus Abaixo De Zero"	Evandro Mesquita	with Evandro Mesquita and Ari Mendes
1988	"Perfil do Personagem"	Evandro Mesquita	with Evandro Mesquita and Celso

== Awards and nominations ==
Year	Award	Category	Work	Result	Ref
2008	Prêmio Qualidade Brasil	Best Supporting Actress	Caminhos do Coração	Nominated	
