= Iafa Britz =

Brazilian film producer and screenwriter

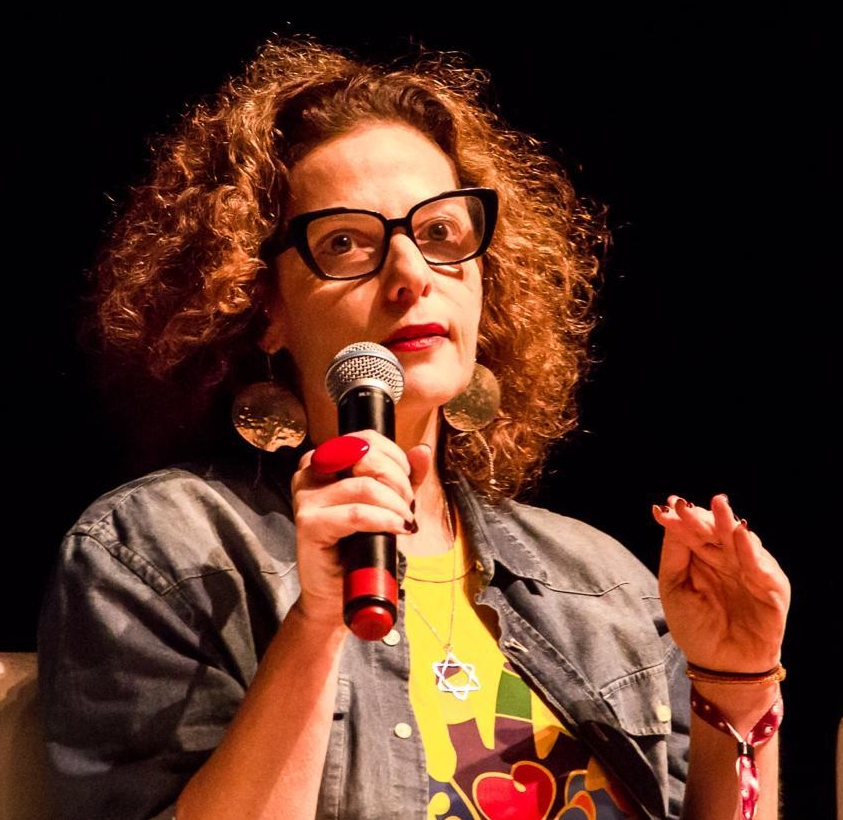
- Iafa Britz in 2023
- Born: August 29, 1971 (age 54); Rio de Janeiro, Brazil
- Occupations: Film producer, screenwriter
- Years active: 1996–present
- Known for: Migdal Filmes
- Notable work: Minha Mãe é uma Peça, Astral City: A Spiritual Journey, Casa Grande, Cássia Eller

Iafa Britz (born August 29, 1971) is a Brazilian film producer and screenwriter. She is co-founder and head of Migdal Filmes, a Brazilian film production company. She is known for producing the Minha Mãe é uma Peça and Nosso Lar film series.

Films she produced include Casa Grande, winner of the Audience Award at the 2014 Festival do Rio, and the documentary Cássia Eller, which received the Audience Award for Best Brazilian Documentary at the São Paulo International Film Festival.

== Biography ==
Born in Rio de Janeiro in 1971, Iafa Britz began working in the Brazilian film industry in the mid-1990s. In 1998, she co-founded the production company Total Filmes.

In 2009, Britz founded Migdal Filmes. The company produced films such as Nosso Lar and the Minha Mãe é uma Peça film series.

Migdal Filmes has also been involved in television productions.

== Filmography ==
=== Film ===
Year	Title	Role
2010	Astral City: A Spiritual Journey	Producer
2013	Minha Mãe é uma Peça	Producer
2014	Casa Grande	Producer
2015	Cássia Eller	Producer
2016	Minha Mãe é uma Peça 2	Producer
2019	My Mom Is a Character 3	Producer
2019	M8 – Quando a Morte Socorre a Vida	Producer
2024	As Polacas	Producer
2024	Nosso Lar 2: Os Mensageiros	Producer

=== Television ===
Year	Series	Role
2011–2015	220 Volts	Producer
2013–2015	As Canalhas	Producer
2020–2024	Matches	Co-producer

=== As screenwriter ===
Year	Title	Role
2015	Linda de Morrer	Screenwriter
2025	(Des)Controle	Story
