= Minha Mãe é uma Peça =

2013 film directed by André Pellenz

Minha Mãe é uma Peça: O Filme
- Theatrical release poster
- Directed by: André Pellenz
- Written by: Fil Braz (screenplay); Paulo Gustavo (play and screenplay)
- Produced by: Iafa Britz
- Starring: Paulo Gustavo; Ingrid Guimarães; Herson Capri; Suely Franco; Monica Martelli; Samantha Schmütz; Alexandra Richter
- Cinematography: Nonato Estrela
- Edited by: Marcelo Moraes
- Music by: Plínio Profeta
- Production company: Migdal Filmes
- Distributed by: Downtown Filmes; Paris Filmes
- Release date: June 21, 2013 (Brazil)
- Country: Brazil
- Language: Portuguese
- Box office: $21,909,567

Minha Mãe é uma Peça: O Filme (transl. My Mom Is A Character) is a 2013 Brazilian comedy film directed by André Pellenz, starring Paulo Gustavo, and written by him in partnership with Fil Braz. The film is based on the play of the same name, created and starred by Paulo Gustavo. The cast of the film version is also composed by Ingrid Guimarães, Herson Capri, Suely Franco, Monica Martelli, Samantha Schmütz and Alexandra Richter.

The film was released in Brazil on June 21, 2013, reaching a mark of two million spectators in its third week in theaters. It was the most watched Brazilian film in 2013 with more than 4,600,145 spectators.

A sequel Minha Mãe é uma Peça 2 was released in December 2016.

== Plot ==
Dona Hermínia is a middle-aged divorced woman, and her ex-husband got in a relationship with a younger woman. Hyperactive, she doesn't leave her children Marcelina and Juliano alone, without realizing that they are already grown ups. One day, after finding out that they consider her annoying, she decides to leave her home without warning, leaving everyone worried about what might have happened. Little did her children know that she went to visit beloved Aunt Zélia to vent her sorrows and remember the good times of the past.

== Cast ==
- Paulo Gustavo as Dona Hermínia
- Mariana Xavier as Marcelina
- Rodrigo Pandolfo as Juliano
- Ingrid Guimarães as Soraia
- Herson Capri as Carlos Alberto
- Suely Franco as Aunt Zélia
- Mônica Martelli as Mônica
- Alexandra Richter as Iesa
- Samantha Schmütz as Valdéia

== Reception ==
=== Box office ===
In the first week of August 2013, the feature film reached the spot of the highest box office of the year by a Brazilian production. The film grossed a total of R$45,8 million.
