= List of 2017 box office number-one films in Brazil =

This is a list of films which placed number-one at the weekend box office in Brazil during 2017. Amounts are in Brazilian reais.

#	Weekend end date	Film	Box office
1	January 8, 2017	Minha Mãe é uma Peça 2	R$15,777,785
2	January 15, 2017	Assassin's Creed	R$12,742,002
3	January 22, 2017	Moana	R$7,955,840
4	January 29, 2017	Resident Evil: The Final Chapter	R$7,303,045
5	February 5, 2017	Rings	R$7,960,664
6	February 12, 2017	Fifty Shades Darker	R$23,139,520
7	February 19, 2017	Fifty Shades Darker	R$10,982,782
8	February 26, 2017	The Great Wall	R$8,585,463
9	March 5, 2017	Logan	R$27,689,053
10	March 12, 2017	Logan	R$18,255,558
11	March 19, 2017	Beauty and the Beast	R$34,129,174
12	March 26, 2017	Beauty and the Beast	R$24,440,569
13	April 2, 2017	Beauty and the Beast	R$15,073,547
14	April 9, 2017	Beauty and the Beast	R$9,733,417
15	April 16, 2017	The Fate of the Furious	R$40,769,813
16	April 23, 2017	The Fate of the Furious	R$28,232,433
17	April 30, 2017	Guardians of the Galaxy Vol. 2	R$21,814,094
18	May 7, 2017	Guardians of the Galaxy Vol. 2	R$12,125,753
19	May 14, 2017	Guardians of the Galaxy Vol. 2	R$6,073,362
20	May 21, 2017	King Arthur: Legend of the Sword	R$7,275,206
21	May 28, 2017	Pirates of the Caribbean: Dead Men Tell No Tales	R$18,398,495
22	June 4, 2017	Wonder Woman	R$23,941,020
23	June 11, 2017	Wonder Woman	R$16,499,999
24	June 18, 2017	Wonder Woman	R$17,700,000
25	June 25, 2017	Wonder Woman	R$8,100,672
26	July 2, 2017	Despicable Me 3	R$26,518,680
27	July 9, 2017	Spider-Man: Homecoming	R$29,289,674
28	July 16, 2017	Spider-Man: Homecoming	R$17,369,945
29	July 23, 2017	Transformers: The Last Knight	R$14,581,586
30	July 30, 2017	Transformers: The Last Knight	R$7,715,677
31	August 6, 2017	War for the Planet of the Apes	R$13,589,792
32	August 13, 2017	War for the Planet of the Apes	R$8,328,915
33	August 20, 2017	Annabelle: Creation	R$13,462,674
34	August 27, 2017	Annabelle: Creation	R$7,215,172
35	September 3, 2017	The Emoji Movie	R$6,454,307
36	September 10, 2017	It	R$17,649,643
37	September 17, 2017	It	R$10,243,987
38	September 24, 2017	It	R$7,175,263
39	October 1, 2017	Kingsman: The Golden Circle	R$6,032,918
40	October 8, 2017	Blade Runner 2049	R$6,140,941
41	October 15, 2017	Woody Woodpecker	R$6,873,406
42	October 22, 2017	Geostorm	R$5,289,575
43	October 29, 2017	Thor: Ragnarok	R$26,314,468
44	November 5, 2017	Thor: Ragnarok	R$25,890,627
45	November 12, 2017	Thor: Ragnarok	R$11,044,929
46	November 19, 2017	Justice League	R$33,165,102
47	November 26, 2017	Justice League	R$17,402,963
48	December 3, 2017	Justice League	R$13,259,989
49	December 10, 2017	Wonder	R$13,560,423
50	December 17, 2017	Star Wars: The Last Jedi	R$23,671,091
51	December 24, 2017	Star Wars: The Last Jedi	R$7,187,161
52	December 31, 2017	Wonder	R$6,677,082

== Highest-grossing films ==
Highest-grossing films of 2017 (in-year releases)
Rank	Title	Distributor	Domestic gross
1	The Fate of the Furious	Universal	R$133,423,662
2	Justice League	Warner	R$133,019,000
3	Beauty and the Beast	Disney	R$130,084,653
4	Despicable Me 3	Universal	R$125,923,345
5	Wonder Woman	Warner	R$109,894,366
6	Spider-Man: Homecoming	Sony	R$102,726,271
7	Thor: Ragnarok	Disney	R$99,761,710
8	Wonder	Paris	R$91.853.543
9	Logan	Fox	R$91,260,487
10	The Shack	Paris	R$74,766,207
11	Moana	Disney	R$71,598,597
12	Guardians of the Galaxy: Vol. 2	Disney	R$67,529,482
13	Fifty Shades Darker	Universal	R$66,565,077
14	Star Wars: The Last Jedi	Disney	R$62,681,757
15	It	Warner	R$61.909.031
16	Pirates of the Caribbean: Dead Men Tell No Tales	Disney	R$55,008,892
17	The Mummy	Universal	R$47.412.358
18	The Boss Baby	Fox	R$46.251.571
19	Transformers: The Last Knight	Paramount	R$43,020,356
20	War for the Planet of the Apes	Fox	R$42,994,417
