= Evandro Mesquita =

Brazilian actor

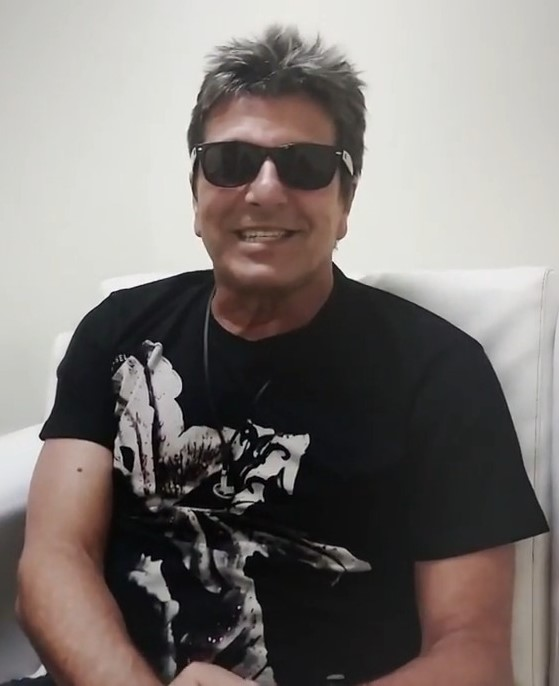
- Born: Evandro Nahid de Mesquita; 19 February 1952 (age 74); Rio de Janeiro, Brazil
- Occupations: Singer, composer, screenwriter, actor
- Spouses: Patricya Travassos (m. 1980; div. 1987) Íris Bustamante (m. 1987; div. 2000)
- Children: 2

Evandro Nahid de Mesquita (born 19 February 1952) is a Brazilian singer, composer, screenwriter, and actor. He is considered a major name in music and television. He became famous after being a creator and lead singer of Blitz, considered a precursor to Brazilian rock in the 1980s that was also nominated for a Latin Grammy.

Meanwhile, Mesquita also became a member of the theatre troupe Asdrúbal Trouxe o Trombone alongside various artists and musicians such as Regina Casé, Patrícia Pillar, Luiz Fernando Guimarães and Cazuza. He became part of the cast of telenovelas such as Top Model (1989), Vamp (1991), Mulheres de Areia (1993), and Bang Bang (2005), along with his participations in series and comedies such as Armação Ilimitada, Sai de Baixo, Malhação, Os Normais, Tapas & Beijos and Justiça 2. In 2005, he became a member of the cast of A Grande Família as the womanizing and semi-illiterate mechanic Paulo "Paulão" Wilson, who became a fan favorite and became one of his most well-known roles, staying in the role until the series finale in 2014.

In film, he made his debut in 1982 with the film O Segredo da Múmia, directed by Ivan Cardoso. Afterwards, he would participate in other films, such as Menino do Rio (1982), Gêmeas (1999), So Normal (2003), Um Lobisomem na Amazônia (2005) e Dona Lurdes - O Filme (2024); along with dubs of American films such as Racing Stripes (2006) and Despicable Me 3 (2017). Mesquita wrote and starred in the film Não Quero Falar sobre Isso Agora (1991), where he won the Kikito de Ouro award for Best Screenwriting at the Festival de Gramado.

== Biography ==
Mesquita was born on 19 February 1952 in Rio de Janeiro and is of Lebanese descent. He studied at the Colégio Estadual André Maurois and took physical education courses at university until his third year, when he started to work with Asdrúbal Trouxe o Trombone in the 1970s.Afterwards, he had great success at the beginning of the 1980s as a lead singer of Blitz. He would begin a solo career after their first formation around 1986. He would also work as a musician and actor.

He has released albums such as Evandro, Planos Aéreos, Procedimento Normal and Almanaque Sexual dos Eletrodomésticos e outros Animais. One of his hits as a solo artist was Babilônia Maravilhosa. He also participated in telenovelas and films, in general playing on tropes about people from Rio de Janeiro: he often portrayed surfers and characters that were clever, charming, flirtatious, and naughty. He currently works as a producer, director, and screenwriter of films, theatre works and albums.

He was well known for his role as "Paulão da Regulagem" on the series A Grande Família on Rede Globo. Along with having released a book in 2008, Xis Tudo, Mesquita returned to leading Blitz, which released, in August 2007, their first DVD, Blitz ao Vivo e a Cores, recorded at the end of 2006 at Canecão in Rio de Janeiro, with guest appearances including Danni Carlos, Paulo Ricardo, Da Ghama, George Israel, Ivete Sangalo, and Fernanda Abreu.

In 2010, Blitz released an album with unreleased music, Skut Blitz, which also brought the band's second DVD, with new music and other features.

After 8 years on A Grande Família, Mesquita started his successful partnership with Beltrão in 2015, on the 5th season of Tapas & Beijos. In the new version of Escolinha do Professor Raimundo, also in 2015, he played Armando Volta, staying on the series until its last season in 2020. In 2017, he would return to telenovelas with his work on Rock Story, interpreting Almir Régis, the father of the antagonist, played by Rafael Vitti. However, it would only be in 2018 that he would return to theatre in a fixed manner with "Espelho da Vida", where he played Emiliano Freitas.

After 15 years, Mesquite returned to comedy films with Depois a Louca Sou Eu, directed by Débora Falabella, playing the role of TV presenter Johnny.

== Personal life ==
=== Relationship ===
In 1977, he began to date actress Patricya Travassos, a friend who was also a member of Asdrúbal Trouxe o Trombone, and with whom he was married to from 1980 to 1987; After they got divorced, he married actress Íris Bustamante, who he remained married to until 2000 and with whom he had a daughter, Manuela Mesquita (born 1988). After divorcing Bustamente, he married the social assistant Andréia Pereira Coutinho, with whom he had his second daughter Alice (born 2006). Since then, Coutinho became a backing vocalist for Blitz.

== Filmography ==
=== Television ===
Year	Title	Role	Note
1985	Armação Ilimitada	Hermínio	Episode: "Uma Dupla do Peru"
1985	Armação Ilimitada	Poliana Jones	Episode: "Perdidos na Selva"
1986	Cambalacho	Alcebíades da Silva	Guest appearance
1986	Cida, a Gata Roqueira	João Príncipe	Telefilm
1987	Tina Turner Especial	Commentator	Special program
1988	Caso Especial	Pedrão	Episode: "Mocinha e Bandido"
1988	Fera Radical	Alex	
1988	Bebê a Bordo	Cicerone	Guest appearance
1989	Top Model	Adaílton Pinto de Saldanha (Saldanha)	
1990	A História de Ana Raio e Zé Trovão	Jacaré	Guest appearance
1991	Vamp	Simão Coalho	
1992	Você Decide	Chico	Episode: "O Álibi"
1993	Mulheres de Areia	Joel Mesquita	
1993	Guerra sem Fim	Francisco Laport	
1995	Malhação	Ivan Reis (Jacaré)	Episodes: "21 de novembro–8 de dezembro"
1996	Você Decide	Arnaldão	Episode: "Bígama de Brás de Pina"
1997	Caça Talentos	Josias Moinho de Vento	Episode: "Presidente Josias"
1997	Alice no País da Música	Motorista	Year end special
1998	Você Decide	Fábio	Episódio: "A Volta por Cima
1998	Você Decide		Episode: "Das Duas Uma"
1999	Você Decide	Marcelo Brandão	Episode: "Amélia que Era Mulher de Verdade"
1999	Vida ao Vivo Show	Vários Personagens	
2000	Sai de Baixo	Chulapa	Episode: "A Obra do Malandro"
2000	Você Decide	Flávio Nunes	Episode: "Pré-Datado"
2001	Estrela-Guia	André Teixeira	
2001	Os Normais	Valdo	Episode: "Complicar é Normal
2001	A Turma do Didi	Himself	Episode: "18 de novembro"
2002	Desejos de Mulher	Fabíolo Andrade (Bill)	
2002	Os Normais	Tobias	Episode: "Gente Normal e Civilizada"
2003	Brava Gente	Edu	Episode: "Como Educar Seus Pais"
2003	Malhação	Rômulo Amorim	Guest appearance
2003	Zorra Total	Maninho	Program: "Pensão da Santinha"
2003	Celebridade	Himself	Guest appearance
2004	Sob Nova Direção	Taxista Nando	Episode: "Dólar é uma Furada"
2004	A Diarista	Romeu	Episode: "Isso Não Está Me Cheirando Bem"
2005	A Diarista	Rámon	Episode: "Aquele do Paraguai I e II"
2005	A Diarista	Heitor dos Prazeres	Episode: "Nete, a Feia"
2005	Bang Bang	Billy the Kid / Henaide / Simon / Edilson	
2005	Mandrake	Javi Kolkata	Episode: "Kolkata"
2005–14	A Grande Família	Paulo Wilson (Paulão da Regulagem)	
2008	Por Toda Minha Vida	José Abelardo Barbosa de Medeiros (Chacrinha)	Episode: "Chacrinha"
2015	Tapas & Beijos	Mustafá Said	Season 5
2015–19	Escolinha do Professor Raimundo	Armando Volta	
2016	Mister Brau	Percival	Episode: "3 de maio"
2017	Rock Story	Almir Régis	Episode: "2 de maio–5 de junho"
2018–19	Espelho da Vida	Emiliano Freitas	
2019	Tá no Ar: a TV na TV	Himself	Episode: "22 de janeiro"
2022	O Menino Maluquinho	Seu Genésio (voice)	
2023	Tem que Suar	Milton Andrade (Seu Milton)	Episodes: "A Volta Dos Que Não Foram"
2023	Compro Likes	Eduardo Martins	Episode: "#BasicBroWagner"
2024	Justiça 2	Carlos Spíu	
2024	Tô Nessa	Jorge Washington	
2025	Encantado's	Paulo Wilson (<i id="mwAkk">Paulão da Regulagem</i>)	Episode: "Greve de Fofoca"

=== Film ===
Year	Title	Role	Note
1982	O Segredo da Múmia	Éverton Soares	
1982	Rio Babilônia		Not credited
1982	Menino do Rio	Paulinho	
1985	The Emerald Forest	Warrior of the Invisible Tribe	
1991	Não Quero Falar sobre Isso Agora	Daniel O'Neil	
1994	Dente por Dente	Dentist-poet	Short film
1998	Como Ser Solteiro	Luís	
1999	Xuxa Requebra	DJ	
1999	Gêmeas	Osmar	
2003	So Normal	Sérgio	
2004	Five Children and It	Coisa (voice)	Dubbing
2004	O Diabo a Quatro	Fúlvio Fontes	
2005	Racing Stripes!	Ganso (voice)	Dubbing
2005	Um Lobisomem na Amazônia	Jean-Pierre	
2005	Chick Thing	Murilo	
2006	Brasília 18%	Paula Ney	
2015	Califórnia		
2017	Despicable Me 3	Balthazar Bratt (voice)	Dubbing
2021	Depois a Louca Sou Eu	Johnny Show	
2022	O Palestrante	Manoel	
2023	Carga Máxima	Odilson	
2024	Dona Lurdes - O Filme	Mário Sérgio	

== Discography ==
Solo

- 1986 - Evandro
- 1988 - Planos Aéreos
- 1989 - Procedimento Normal
- 1991 - Almanaque Sexual dos Eletrodomésticos e Outros Animais

with Blitz

- 1982 - As Aventuras da Blitz
- 1983 - Radioatividade
- 1984 - Blitz 3
- 1994 - BLITZ Ao Vivo
- 1997 - Línguas
- 1999 - Últimas Notícias
- 2006 - Blitz Com Vida
- 2007 - Blitz – Ao Vivo e a Cores
- 2010 - Skut Blitz
- 2012 - Skut Blitz Ao Vivo'

Others

- 1983 - A Farra da Terra (with Asdrúbal Trouxe o Trombone)
