= So Normal =

2003 film by José Alvarenga Jr.

- Theatrical release poster
- Portuguese: Os Normais: O Filme
- Directed by: José Alvarenga Jr.
- Written by: Alexandre Machado; Fernanda Young
- Based on: Os Normais by: Alexandre Machado; Fernanda Young
- Produced by: Guel Arraes
- Starring: Luiz Fernando Guimarães; Fernanda Torres; Marisa Orth; Evandro Mesquita
- Cinematography: Tuca Moraes
- Edited by: Paulo Henrique Farias
- Music by: Marcio Lomiranda
- Production companies: Missão Impossível 5; Globo Filmes
- Distributed by: Lumière
- Release date: 24 October 2003 (Brazil)
- Running time: 90 minutes
- Country: Brazil
- Language: Portuguese
- Box office: R$19.9 million (Brazil)

So Normal (Portuguese: Os Normais: O Filme) is a 2003 Brazilian comedy film directed by José Alvarenga Jr. from a screenplay by Alexandre Machado and Fernanda Young, based on the Brazilian television sitcom Os Normais. The film stars Luiz Fernando Guimarães, Fernanda Torres, Marisa Orth and Evandro Mesquita. It depicts the beginning of the relationship between the characters Rui and Vani.

The film was released in Brazil on 24 October 2003 by Lumière, drawing one million admissions in its opening week and nearly three million in total. So Normal grossed R$19,874,866 at the Brazilian box office, becoming the third highest-grossing domestic film and the eighth highest-grossing film overall of 2003 in Brazil.

A sequel, So Normal 2: The Craziest Night Ever (Portuguese: Os Normais 2: A Noite Mais Maluca de Todas), was released in Brazil on 28 August 2009.

== Cast ==
- Luiz Fernando Guimarães as Rui
- Fernanda Torres as Vani
- Marisa Orth as Marta
- Evandro Mesquita as Sérgio
- Emílio Pitta as Father Alencar
- Tutuca as Marta's father
- Lupe Gigliotti as Sérgio's mother
- Fabiana Gugli as Vani's cousin
- Ana Baird as Ângela
- Mário Schoemberger as second mate
