= Hamilton Vaz Pereira =

- Born: Hamilton de Souza Pinto Vaz Pereira; 10 December 1951 (age 74); Rio de Janeiro, Brazil
- Occupations: Director, author, actor, composer, musical director
- Years active: 1970–present
- Spouse: Regina Casé (1973–1977)

Hamilton de Souza Pinto Vaz Pereira (born 10 December 1951) is a Brazilian director, author, actor, composer, and musical director.

== Biography ==
Vaz Pereira directed every piece from Asdrúbal Trouxe o Trombone in the 1970s, along with Regina Casé, Daniel Dantas, Jorge Alberto, and Luiz Fernando Guimarães, among others. He was considered the leader of the group. He studied theatre at Teatro O Tablado with Maria Clara Machado. In 2014, he participated in some episodes of the Multishow series Por Isso Eu Sou Vingativa as Rodrigues.

Vaz Pereira was married to Casé from 1973 to 1977.

== Filmography ==
=== Film ===
Year	Title	Role	Notes
2026	Velhos Bandidos		
2024	Aumenta que É Rock 'n Roll	Dr. Medeiros	
2023	Fervo	Cézar	
2022	O Tablado e Maria Clara Machado	Himself	Documentary
2016	O Roubo da Taça	Bishop	
2015	Depois de Tudo	Paulino	
2013	A Memória que Me Contam	Henrique	
1999	São Jerônimo	Damaso	
1994	Mil e Uma		
1986	O Cinema Falado	Man in Monologue	
1972	D'Gajão Mata Para Vingar		
1970	A Dança das Bruxas		

=== Television ===
Year	Title	Role	Notes
2015-2018	Magnífica 70	Inácio	16 episodes
2014	Por Isso Eu Sou Vingativa		1 episode
