= List of 2018 box office number-one films in Brazil =

This is a list of films which placed number-one at the weekend box office in Brazil during 2018.

#	Weekend end date	Film	Box office
1	January 7, 2018	Jumanji: Welcome to the Jungle	US$5,028,905
2	January 14, 2018	Ferdinand	US$3,620,826
3	January 21, 2018	Jumanji: Welcome to the Jungle	US$2,352,682
4	January 28, 2018	Maze Runner: The Death Cure	US$2,329,314
5	February 4, 2018	Maze Runner: The Death Cure	US$1,336,227
6	February 11, 2018	Fifty Shades Freed	US$5,840,945
7	February 18, 2018	Black Panther	US$9,539,422
8	February 25, 2018	Black Panther	US$5,980,427
9	March 4, 2018	Black Panther	US$4,398,725
10	March 11, 2018	Black Panther	US$3,126,333
11	March 18, 2018	Tomb Raider	US$1,958,950
12	March 25, 2018	Pacific Rim: Uprising	US$1,516,786
13	April 1, 2018	Nothing to Lose	US$7,885,415
14	April 8, 2018	Nothing to Lose	US$4,275,654
15	April 15, 2018	Nothing to Lose	US$3,673,606
16	April 22, 2018	Nothing to Lose	US$3,480,195
17	April 29, 2018	Avengers: Infinity War	US$19,062,450
18	May 6, 2018	Avengers: Infinity War	US$12,423,610
19	May 13, 2018	Avengers: Infinity War	US$6,320,250
20	May 20, 2018	Deadpool 2	US$7,242,369
21	May 27, 2018	Deadpool 2	US$2,261,231
22	June 3, 2018	Deadpool 2	US$3,172,158
23	June 10, 2018	Ocean's 8	US$1,636,275
24	June 17, 2018	Jurassic World: Fallen Kingdom	US$2,992,248
25	June 24, 2018	Jurassic World: Fallen Kingdom	US$4,346,077
26	July 1, 2018	Incredibles 2	US$6,646,545
27	July 8, 2018	Incredibles 2	US$4,881,582
28	July 15, 2018	Hotel Transylvania 3: Summer Vacation	US$3,741,914
29	July 22, 2018	Hotel Transylvania 3: Summer Vacation	US$3,202,000
30	July 29, 2018	Mission: Impossible – Fallout	US$3,807,878
31	August 5, 2018	Mission: Impossible – Fallout	US$2,477,316
32	August 12, 2018	The Meg	US$2,029,441
33	August 19, 2018	The Meg	US$1,403,942
34	August 26, 2018	The Meg	US$845,458
35	September 2, 2018	Teen Titans Go! To the Movies	US$998,050
36	September 9, 2018	The Nun	US$6,407,090
37	September 16, 2018	The Nun	US$3,434,075
38	September 23, 2018	The Nun	US$1,748,025
39	September 30, 2018	Smallfoot	US$1,259,347
40	October 7, 2018	Venom	US$4,911,683
41	October 14, 2018	Venom	US$4,903,913
42	October 21, 2018	Venom	US$2,016,889
43	October 28, 2018	Halloween	US$1,388,599
44	November 4, 2018	Bohemian Rhapsody	US$2,389,986
45	November 11, 2018	Bohemian Rhapsody	US$2,073,712
46	November 18, 2018	Fantastic Beasts: The Crimes of Grindelwald	US$5,787,484
47	November 25, 2018	Fantastic Beasts: The Crimes of Grindelwald	US$2,049,107
48	December 2, 2018	Fantastic Beasts: The Crimes of Grindelwald	US$1,211,659
49	December 9, 2018	Robin Hood	US$880,014
50	December 16, 2018	Aquaman	US$7,249,233
51	December 23, 2018	Aquaman	US$4,693,224
52	December 30, 2018	Aquaman	US$4,016,451

== Highest-grossing films ==
Highest-grossing films of 2018 (in-year releases)
Rank	Title	Distributor	Domestic gross
1	Avengers: Infinity War	Disney	$66,684,469
2	Incredibles 2	Disney	$37,575,760
3	Black Panther	Disney	$36,942,425
4	Nothing to Lose	Paris Filmes	$32,995,668
5	Aquaman	Warner Bros.	$25,522,543
6	Jurassic World: Fallen Kingdom	Universal	$21,288,295
7	Jumanji: Welcome to the Jungle	Sony Pictures	$21,855,447
8	Minha Vida em Marte	Paris Filmes	$21,105,636
9	The Nun	Warner Bros.	$20,471,934
10	Fifty Shades Freed	Universal	$19,747,467
11	Hotel Transylvania 3: Summer Vacation	Sony	$19,517,326
12	Venom	Sony	$19,031,137
13	Deadpool 2	20th Century Studios	$17,158,599
14	Fantastic Beasts: The Crimes of Grindelwald	Warner Bros.	$15,145,457
15	Bohemian Rhapsody	20th Century Studios	$14,394,701
16	Ferdinand	20th Century Studios	$14,284,170
17	Ant-Man and the Wasp	Disney	$13,010,094
18	Mission: Impossible – Fallout	Paramount Pictures	$11,796,465
19	The Beachnickers	Paris Filmes	$9,786,399
20	Coco	Disney	$9,391,879
