= My Mom Is a Character 3 =

2019 film directed by Susana Garcia

- Brazilian theatrical release poster
- Minha Mãe é uma Peça 3
- Directed by: Susana Garcia
- Written by: Paulo Gustavo; Fil Braz; Susana Garcia
- Starring: Paulo Gustavo; Rodrigo Pandolfo; Mariana Xavier; Herson Capri; Alexandra Richter; Patricya Travassos; Samantha Schmütz; Malu Valle; Stella Maria Rodrigues
- Edited by: Leonardo Gouvea
- Production companies: Migdal Filmes co-produced by: Downtown Filmes; Paris Filmes; Globo Filmes; Telecine; Paramount; Universal
- Distributed by: Downtown Filmes
- Release date: December 26, 2019 (Brazil)
- Running time: 109 minutes
- Country: Brazil
- Language: Portuguese
- Budget: R$ 8 million (US$2.1 million)
- Box office: R$ 181.7 million (US$39.2 million)

My Mom Is a Character 3 (Portuguese: Minha Mãe é uma Peça 3) is a 2019 Brazilian comedy film written and starred by Paulo Gustavo, based on his play of the same name. Produced by Migdal Filmes, Globo Filmes, Universal Pictures and Paramount Pictures and distributed by Downtown Filmes, it is a sequel to the 2016 film Minha Mãe é uma Peça 2.

My Mom Is a Character 3 was theatrically released on December 26, 2019. After its release, the film received mixed to positive reviews, with some critics praising its consistent plot that differs from its prequels. The film has grossed R$181.7 million and as of May 2020, it is the highest-grossing and the second most viewed film in Brazilian film history.

== Plot ==
Dona Hermínia (Paulo Gustavo) will have to rediscover and reinvent herself because her children are forming new families.

The super mom will have to brace herself and deal with the changes in her life: Marcelina (Mariana Xavier) is pregnant and Juliano (Rodrigo Pandolfo) is getting married. Dona Hermínia is more anxious than ever, and, on top of that, her ex-husband Carlos Alberto (Herson Capri), who was always around to begin with, decides to move in to the apartment next door.

== Cast ==
- Paulo Gustavo as Dona Herminia Amaral
- Rodrigo Pandolfo as Juliano Amaral Vieira
- Mariana Xavier as Marcelina Amaral Vieira
- Herson Capri as Carlos Alberto Vieira
- Alexandra Richter as Iesa Amaral Leite
- Patricya Travassos as Lúcia Helena Amaral
- Samantha Schmütz as Waldeia
- Malu Valle as Dona Lourdes
- Lucas Cordeiro as Tiago
- Cadu Fávero as Sol
- Stella Maria Rodrigues as Ana
- Camila Mayrink as Lizandra
- Bruno Bebianno as Garib Amaral Vieira

== Reception ==
=== Critical reception ===
Tony Goes from Folha de S.Paulo said “The surprise in “Minha Mãe É uma Peça 3” is precisely the plot, much more consistent than in previous projects.“

Nocolaos Garófalo from Omelete said “Although it is point to show Herminia's almost total independence from men, with the character inspired by Gustavo's mother traveling abroad, going to parties and having fun with her sister and friends, the plot undermines any reference to her independence in worn jokes about Herminia's age and how much she and Carlos Alberto have become “useless” and “crumbled” over time.”

=== Box office ===
The film reached 1 million admissions in its opening weekend and 1.8 million admissions in the first week. After the second week, it surpassed 5 million admissions, 8 million admissions in the third week and 10 million admissions in the fourth week.

As of May 2020, with 11.5 million admissions, it is the second most watched and the highest-grossing film in the history of Brazilian cinema grossing R$181.7 million.
