= Dulce Quental =

Brazilian singer and composer (born 1960)

- Born: Dulce Maria Rossi Quental; April 13, 1960 (age 66); Rio de Janeiro, Brazil
- Genres: Brazilian pop, MPB
- Occupation: Singer

Dulce Quental (born 13 April 1960) is a Brazilian singer and composer.

== Biography ==
Quental was born in Rio de Janeiro. She was the singer of the band Sempre Livre in the early 1980s, and recorded her first solo disc, Délica, in 1985. She sings pop music, jazz and bossa nova. In 1987, she recorded Voz Azul, produced by Herbert Vianna (who offers her as a gift the song Caleidoscópio).

In 1988 her third solo album, Dulce Quental, with songs by Arnaldo Antunes and Roberto Frejat (Onde Mora o Amor), by Arrigo Barnabé (Numa Praia do Brasil), by Itamar Assumpção (Mulher Dividida), by Cazuza by George Israel (Inocência do Prazer) and by Humberto Gessinger (Terra de Gigantes).

She composed songs to be sung by Nico Rezende, Leila Pinheiro, Capital Inicial, Daúde, and other singers. After fifteen years without appearing live or recording, she released a new album, Beleza Roubada, which was critically acclaimed.

== Discography ==
- 2005 — Anos 80: Multishow ao Vivo (CD/DVD)
- 2004 — Beleza Roubada, Cafezinho/Sony CD
- 2001 — Dulce Quental Série Para Sempre, EMI CD
- 1988 — Dulce Quental, EMI-Odeon LP
- 1987 — Voz Azul, EMI-Odeon LP
- 1986 — Délica, EMI-Odeon LP
- 1984 — Avião de combate, (com o Sempre Livre) LP

== See also ==
- Música popular brasileira
