= Geraldo Casé =

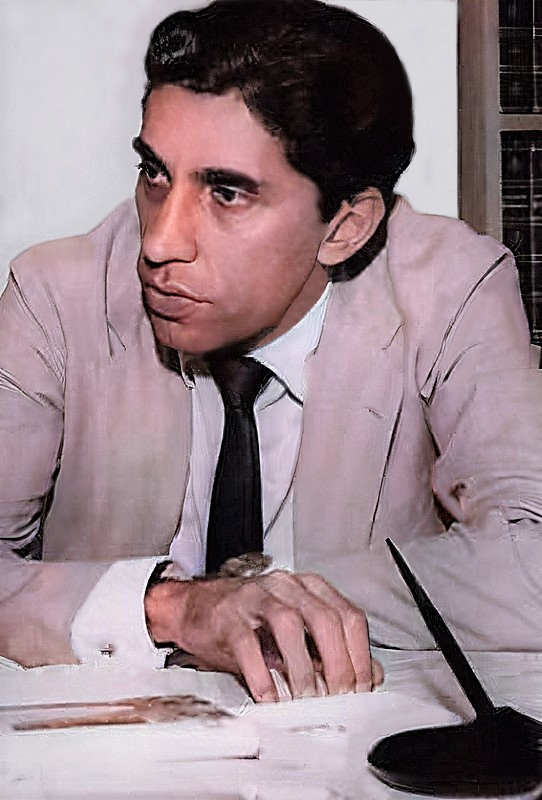
- Casé in 1961
- Born: 7 June 1928; Rio de Janeiro, Brazil
- Died: 21 July 2008 (aged 80); Rio de Janeiro, Brazil
- Occupations: Producer, writer, and TV director
- Children: Regina Casé

Geraldo César Casé (7 June 1928 – 21 July 2008) was a Brazilian producer, writer, and TV director.

Casé was born on 7 June 1928 in Rio de Janeiro, the son of Graziella Passos Casé and Ademar Casé, a pioneering presenter of Brazilian radio. In addition, his brothers were architect Paulo Casé and publicist Maurício Casé, along with being the father of actress Regina Casé.

As a child, he would accompany his father and help him on Programa do Casé on Rádio Philips, where he worked as a sound designer, audio operator, and afterwards, artistic director. Along with Phillips, he worked at both Rádio Mayrink Veiga and Rádio Globo. After some time in those places, he would begin to work in television.

Casé worked at almost all of the major television stations at the time (TV Tupi, TV Rio, TV Excelsior, TV Continental, TVE and TV Paulista, and was one step away from working at a regional office at Rede Globo). In the field of entertainment, he created the talk show Um Instante, Maestro, which was presented by Flávio Cavalcanti. Always linked to children's programming, he created shows such as Teatro de Malasartes and Fantoche estrela. In theatre, he directed A fábrica dos sonhos. The biggest achievement by Casé however, was the adaptation of the stories of Sítio do Picapau Amarelo by Monteiro Lobato, which ran from 1977 to 1986. He also composed, with Dori Caymmi, TV show soundtrack music such as "A Cuca te pega", "Rabicó" and "Quindim". As the result of this conversation between him and his daughter, he gave inspiration to the name of a theatre troupe that his daughter worked with, Asdrúbal Trouxe o Trombone. He also directed the artistry department of TV Bandeirantes. His last occupation was as artistic director of the International Division of Rede Globo.

In 2002, he released a book of poetry titled "Um dia fui pássaro".

== Death ==
Casé died on 21 July 2008 in Rio de Janeiro due to respiratory failure. He had been interned since 12 July at Clínica São Vicente in the Gávea neighborhood. He was buried at São João Batista cemetery in Botafogo.
