= Vereda Tropical =

- Genre: Telenovela
- Created by: Carlos Lombardi
- Directed by: Jorge Fernando; Guel Arraes
- Starring: Lucélia Santos
- Opening theme: "Vereda Tropical", Ney Matogrosso
- Country of origin: Brazil
- Original language: Portuguese
- No. of episodes: 167

Original release
- Network: Rede Globo
- Release: June 23, 1984 – February 2, 1985

Vereda Tropical is a 1984 Brazilian telenovela created by Carlos Lombardi, and starring Lucélia Santos.

== Plot ==
Silvana (Lucélia Santos) is a simple girl, raised by her grandmother Da Paz since she was a small child, when she lost her parents. Operator of the CPP perfume factory, she stands out as the leader in the work. There she meets Victor, Oliva's son, owner of the factory, with whom initiates romance.

== Cast ==
Actor	Character
Lucélia Santos	Silvana Rocha
Mário Gomes	Luca (Luís Carlos Travatti)
Walmor Chagas	Oliva (Vicente de Oliva Salgado)
Geórgia Gomide	Bina (Balbina Travatti)
Gianfrancesco Guarnieri	Jamil Beirut / Genaro
Maria Zilda Bethlem	Verônica de Oliva Salgado
Marieta Severo	Catarina de Oliva Salgado
Paulo Betti	Marco Aurélio Travatti
Nuno Leal Maia	Bertazzo (Mário Bertazzo)
Kito Junqueira	Alfredo Bertazzo
Cristina Mullins	Léo (Maria Leopoldina Vilela)
Paulo Guarnieri	Cesco (Francesco Travatti)
Marcos Frota	Téo (Teófilo de Oliva Salgado)
Cristina Pereira	Gaby (Gabriela de Oliva Salgado)
Angelina Muniz	Angelina Travatti
Rosamaria Murtinho	Bárbara Vilela
John Herbert	Celso Vilela
Luiz Fernando Guimarães	Miro (Argemiro Mistieri)
Luiz Carlos Arutin	Bepe (Giuseppe Ernesto Bertazzo)
Vic Militello	Theda Bara
Eduardo Tornaghi	Bráulio Vilela
Matilde Mastrangi	Marilinda
Norma Geraldy	Maria da Paz
Marina Miranda	Dirce
Catarina Abdalla	Guilhermina
Nildo Parente	Rodrigues
Paulo Leão	Chefe da Mudança
Ênio Santos	Péricles
Jonas Torres	Zeca Pedra (José Carlos Rocha)
