= Vamp (TV series) =

- Genre: Telenovela; Black comedy; Fantasy
- Created by: Antônio Calmon
- Starring: Cláudia Ohana; Ney Latorraca; Reginaldo Faria; Joana Fomm; Fábio Assunção; Vera Holtz; Nuno Leal Maia; Patricya Travassos; Otávio Augusto; Guilherme Leme; Bel Kutner; Daniela Camargo; Marcos Frota; Paulo Gracindo; Evandro Mesquita; Bete Coelho
- Opening theme: "Noite Preta"
- Composer: Vange Leonel - Cilmara Bedaque
- Country of origin: Brazil
- Original language: Portuguese
- No. of episodes: 179

Production
- Running time: 50 minutes

Original release
- Network: TV Globo
- Release: 15 July 1991 – 8 February 1992

Vamp is a Brazilian telenovela produced and broadcast at 7:00 PM by TV Globo, from 15 July 1991 to 8 February 1992, in 179 chapters.

In February 2016, the telenovela was released in DVD by Globo Marcas.

== Plot ==
Armação dos Anjos, on the coast of the state of Rio de Janeiro. The retired captain Jonas Rocha, a widower with six children, married the historian Carmen Maura, also a widow with six children. They will have new problems, beyond those common to a large family, when in contact with the vampires that plague the city with the arrival of the famous singer Natasha to record a music video.

Natasha, a rock singer, has sold her soul to the terrible Count Vladymir Polanski, head of the vampires, to shine in her career. But she finds that she was, in previous incarnations, Eugenia, his love, who preferred to stay with Richardson, the other life of Captain Jonas. The count goes on to pursue Natasha and family of the captain, even using his powers to engage Carmen Maura.

Natasha, in turn, wants to destroy Vlad to get rid of her curse. The only weapon she has for this is the Cross of St. Sebastian, which is hidden somewhere in Armação dos Anjos. The cross must be held by a man named "Rocha" ("Rock"). The hero is thus Captain Jonas.

In Armação dos Anjos there is also Jurandir, who is running from Cachorrão ("Big Dog"), a rich leader of criminals whose house Jurandir robbed by mistake. In the city, he hides in the robes of a priest, befriends the kids and get the nickname Padre Garotão ("Father Young Man"). The gown, however, is not a stumbling block to his mad love affair with Marina, a protégée of Cachorrão.

== Cast ==
Actor/Actress	Character
Cláudia Ohana	Natasha Rebelo/Eugênia Queiroz
Ney Latorraca	Conde Vladimir Polanski/Otavinho Freire
Reginaldo Faria	Capitão Jonas Rocha/Felipe Rocha
Joana Fomm	Carmem Maura de Araújo Góes
Nuno Leal Maia	Jurandir Figueira (Priest Garotão)
Aída Leiner	Branca
Aleph Del Moral	Rubinho (Rubens de Araújo Góes)
Amora Mautner	Paula Sousa
André Gonçalves	Matosinho
Bel Kutner	Scarleth de Araújo Góes
Bete Coelho	Jezebel
Bia Seidl	Soninha
Carol Machado	Dorothy de Araújo Góes
Daniela Camargo	Lena (Helena de Araújo Góes)
Evandro Mesquita	Simão
Fábio Assunção	Lipe (Felipe Ramos Rocha)
Felipe Pinheiro	Vampiro Giron
Fernanda Rodrigues	Isa (Isabel Ramos Rocha)
Flávio Silvino	Matosão
Francisco Milani	Max
Frederico Mayrink	Pedro
Guilherme Leme	Gerald Lamas
Henrique Farias	Nando (Fernando Ramos Rocha)
Igor Lage	Pingo
Inês Galvão	Joana
João Rebello	Sig (Sigmund de Araújo Góes)
Jonas Torres	Daniel Rocha
José Paulo Jr.	Tico (Henrique Ramos Rocha)
Juliana Martins	Esmeralda
Luciana Vendramini	Jade Ramos Rocha
Marcelo Picchi	Moreira
Marcus Alvisi	Padre Estevão
Marcos Breda	Rafael/Diogo Queiroz
Marcos Frota	Augusto Sérgio
Norma Geraldy	Hemengharda
Oswaldo Louzada	Padre Eusébio
Otávio Augusto	Osvaldo Matoso
Patricya Travassos	Mary Ramos
Pedro Vasconcellos	João Ramos Rocha
Rodrigo Penna	León de Araújo Góes
Tony Tornado	Pai Gil
Vera Holtz	Alice Penn Taylor
Vera Zimmermann	Marina
Zezé Polessa	Sílvia Sousa
Jorge Cherques	Friar Bartholomeu

Special participation

Actor	Character
Paulo José	Ivan Sousa
Cleyde Yáconis	Virgínia Ramos
Paulo Gracindo	Arlindo Maranhão (Cachorrão)
Giulia Gam	Lucia T.
Maria Zilda Bethlem	Telma
Cristina Pereira	Luísa

== See also ==
- Vampire film
- List of vampire television series
