= As Filhas da Mãe =

2001 Brazilian telenovela

- Genre: Telenovela
- Created by: Silvio de Abreu
- Written by: Alcides Nogueira; Bosco Brasil; Sandra Louzada
- Directed by: Jorge Fernando
- Starring: Fernanda Montenegro; Francisco Cuoco; Cláudia Raia; Andréa Beltrão; Bete Coelho; Patricya Travassos; Thiago Lacerda; Raul Cortez
- Opening theme: "Alô, Alô, Brasil" by Eduardo Dussek
- Country of origin: Brazil
- Original language: Portuguese
- No. of episodes: 125

Production
- Camera setup: Multi-camera

Original release
- Network: TV Globo
- Release: 27 August 2001 – 19 January 2002

As Filhas da Mãe is a Brazilian telenovela produced and broadcast by TV Globo. It premiered on 27 August 2001, replacing Um Anjo Caiu do Céu, and ended on 19 January 2002, replaced by Desejos de Mulher. The telenovela is written by Silvio de Abreu, with the collaboration of Alcides Nogueira, Bosco Brasil, and Sandra Louzada.

It stars Fernanda Montenegro, Cláudia Raia, Andréa Beltrão, Bete Coelho, Patricya Travassos, Thiago Lacerda, and Raul Cortez.

== Cast ==
- Fernanda Montenegro as Lucinda Maria Barbosa Cavalcante "Lulu de Luxemburgo"
- Cláudia Raia as Ramona Barbosa Cavalcante / Ramón Barbosa Cavalcante
- Andréa Beltrão as Tatiana Barbosa Cavalcante
- Bete Coelho as Alessandra Barbosa Cavalcante
- Patricya Travassos as Milagros Quintana
- Thiago Lacerda as Adriano Araújo
- Raul Cortez as Arthur Brandão
- Alexandre Borges as Leonardo Brandão
- Regina Casé as Rosalva Rocha dos Anjos Cavalcante
- Tony Ramos as Manolo Gutierrez
- Cláudia Ohana as Aurora Áurea "Orora"
- Reynaldo Gianecchini as Ricardo Brandão
- Cláudia Jimenez as Dagmar Cerqueira
- Priscila Fantin as Joana Rocha dos Anjos
- Mário Frias as Diego Gutierrez
- Lavínia Vlasak as Valentine Ventura
- Tuca Andrada as Nicolau "Nico" Rocha
- Diogo Vilela as Webster Pereira
- Virgínia Cavendish as Maria Leopoldina Pereira
- Yoná Magalhães as Violante Ventura
- Cleyde Yáconis as Georgina "Gorgo" Gutierrez
- Flávio Migliaccio as Barnabé
- Elias Gleizer as Deodoro Rocha "Seu Dedé"
- Bruno Gagliasso as José Carlos "Zeca" Rocha dos Anjos
- Pedro Garcia Netto as Pedro Rocha dos Anjos
- Viviane Novaes as Érika
- Lulo Scroback as Waldeck Ventura
- Nelson Xavier as Mauro das Flores
- Emiliano Queiroz as João Alberto
- Jacqueline Laurence as Margot de Montparnasse
- Cristina Pereira as Divina
- Nelson Freitas as Clóvis
- Gustavo Falcão as Faísca
- Marcelo Barros as Polenta
- Hilda Rebello as Dona Geralda
- Ana Beatriz Cisneiros as Amanda Rocha dos Anjos
- Felipe Latgé as Felipe "Felipinho" Augusto Pereira
- Isabella Cunha as Maria Elizabeth Pereira
- Cláudia Lira as Dalete
