= Lumière (Brazilian film company) =

Brazilian film production and distribution company

- Industry: Film and media
- Founded: 1989; 36 years ago
- Headquarters: Rio de Janeiro, Brazil

Lumière is a Brazilian film production and distribution company that is based in Rio de Janeiro.

== Overview ==
Lumière was founded in 1989 by Bruno Wainer, a Brazilian executive director, and Marc Beauchamps. The company began as a distributor of independent and international titles for theatrical, home video, and television rights. From 1996 to 2003, Lumière maintained an exclusive output deal with Miramax for the territory of Brazil. Titles released during this period include The English Patient, Chicago and the Scary Movie franchise. By 2002, Lumière was the market leading independent distributor in Brazil.

Lumière premiered its operations as a motion picture producer in 1996 with Little Book of Love. Since then, Lumière has also distributed films such as City of God, Madame Satã and Os Normais.

In mid-2000, Lumière participated in the production of City of God, directed by Fernando Meirelles, serving as both a co-producer and distributor. The company oversaw the film's distribution strategy and facilitated contractual agreements with international distributors Miramax and Wild Bunch.

At the end of 2005, Bruno Wainer departed from Lumière and established Downtown Filmes, an independent distribution company focused exclusively on Brazilian content. In July 2013, Marc Beauchamps, a French co-founder, was accused of international drug trafficking and subsequently resigned from the company's board. Although Lumière has not actively distributed films for an extended period, it remains officially registered with active status.
