= Samantha Schmütz =

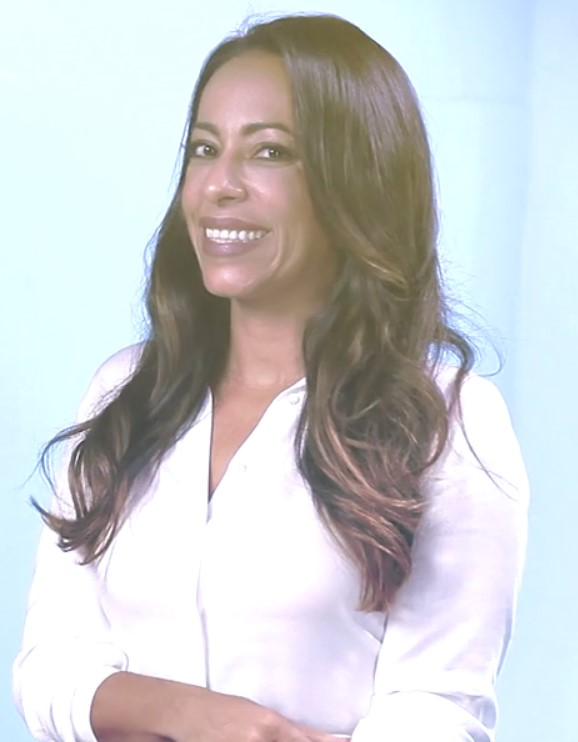
- Schmütz in 2016
- Born: Samantha Schmütz; 28 January 1979 (age 46); Niterói, Rio de Janeiro, Brazil
- Occupation(s): Actress, comedian
- Years active: 1998–present
- Spouse: Michael Cannet (m. 2012)

Samantha Schmütz Cannet (born January 28, 1979) is a Brazilian actress and comedian.

== Filmography ==
=== Television ===
Year	Title	Role	Notes
2005	A Diarista	Berusca	Cameo
2006; 2012	Zorra Total	Marina/Mulher Caxumba/Juninho Play/Pina	Various roles
2006	Cobras & Lagartos	Bê	Cameo
2006	Pé na Jaca	Célia	
2013–present	Vai Que Cola	Jéssica	Main role
2014	Não Tá Fácil Pra Ninguém	Presenter	
2014	Multishow Comedy Awards	Herself	
2015	Aí Eu Vi Vantagem	Jéssica	Spin-off of Vai Que Cola
2015	Tomara que Caia	Marivalda/Deusa	2 episodes
2015	Totalmente Demais	Isadora Castilho (Dorinha)	
2018	Popstar	Herself	

=== Film ===
Year	Title	Role
2009	Xuxa em O Mistério de Feiurinha	Chapeuzinho Vermelho
2013	Minha Mãe é uma Peça - O Filme	Valdéia
2015	Vai Que Cola - O Filme	Jéssica
2016	Tô Ryca	Selminha
2016	Minha Mãe é Uma Peça 2	Valdéia

=== Web ===
Year	Title	Role	Notes
2015-present	Juninho Play e Família	Juninho Play (voice), Marina (voice), Leonina (voice)	Animated series.
