= Paulo Gustavo =

Brazilian actor and comedian (1978–2021)

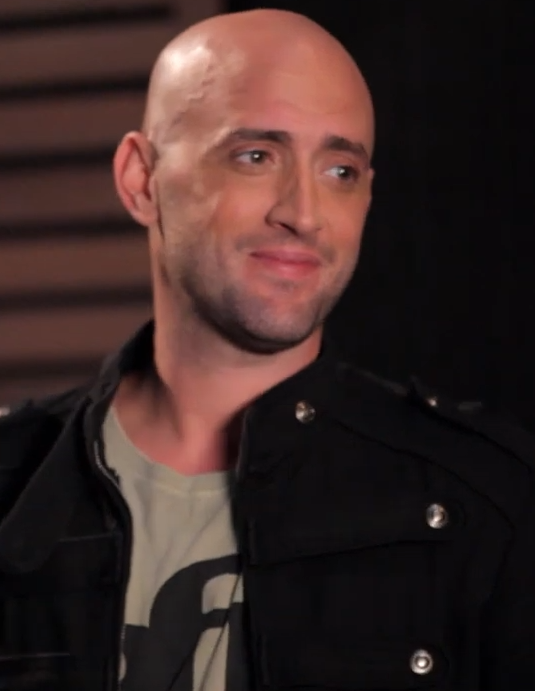
- Paulo Gustavo in 2019
- Born: Paulo Gustavo Amaral Monteiro de Barros; 30 October 1978; Niterói, Rio de Janeiro, Brazil
- Died: 4 May 2021 (aged 42); Rio de Janeiro, Brazil
- Occupations: Actor; comedian; director; screenwriter; television presenter
- Years active: 2004–2021
- Spouse: Thales Bretas (m. 2015)
- Children: 2

Paulo Gustavo Amaral Monteiro de Barros (30 October 1978 – 4 May 2021), commonly known as Paulo Gustavo, was a Brazilian actor, comedian, director, screenwriter, and presenter.

He became known for the play Minha Mãe é uma Peça, which, in 2013, became a feature film. It became the most watched film of the year in Brazil, and in 2015, it was published as a book by the publisher Objetiva. Due to the huge success of critics and audiences, it was followed by two sequels, Minha Mãe é uma Peça 2 in 2016, and Minha Mãe é uma Peça 3 in 2019.

Nominated for the Shell Award for Best Actor, Paulo Gustavo graduated from the Casa das Artes de Laranjeiras (CAL) in early 2005, together with Fábio Porchat, Marcus Majella, among others.

== Career ==
Gustavo gained visibility at the end of 2004, when he joined the cast of the play Surto. On occasion, he introduced the humorous female character Dona Hermínia. After his graduation in January 2005, he left the cast of Surto and joined the play Infraturas. During this period he also began to make small appearances on TV, such as in the telenovela Prova de Amor, by RecordTV, and in the series A Diarista, by Globo. In 2006, the play Minha Mãe É Uma Peça premiered; it was adapted for cinema in 2013 and gained a sequel in 2016. In the monologue, with a text of his own, Gustavo again played Dona Hermínia. Built through her domestic and experiential observations, it brings together the most comical aspects of the personality of a typical middle-aged housewife, always on the verge of a nervous breakdown. His performance earned him a Prêmio Shell nomination for best actor.

Gustavo starred in a title again on stage in 2010, to present the show Hiperativo, directed by Fernando Caruso. In 2011, he became the host of 220 Volts. In June 2013, the sitcom Vai Que Cola debuted in TV production at Multishow, which spawned a film adaptation in 2015. In 2014, the actor was on a new program, the reality Paulo Gustavo na Estrada, by Multishow.

In 2017, he left Vai Que Cola and joined the program A Vila, along with Katiuscia Canoro, with the script by Leandro Soares. In 2018, he recorded the DVD of the play Minha Mãe é uma Peça in the Concha Acustica at Teatro Castro Alves in the city of Salvador.

== Personal life ==
Born and raised in a middle-class family in the city of Niterói, in Greater Rio de Janeiro, Gustavo studied at the traditional Colégio Salesiano during elementary school. Openly homosexual since adolescence, on 20 December 2015, he married dermatologist Thales Bretas. On 13 October 2017, Gustavo announced on his Instagram that he and his husband would be the parents of twins, whom they planned to name Gael and Flora, conceived through surrogacy, but the babies died in a miscarriage. They thought about giving up on becoming parents, but decided to look for another surrogate. On 18 August 2019, in a post on his Instagram, he announced the birth of the couple's children, called Romeu and Gael, from different surrogates.

=== Illness and death ===
On 13 March 2021, Gustavo was admitted with a diagnosis of COVID-19. On 2 April, his illness worsened and he was introduced to extracorporeal membrane oxygenation. On 3 May, even after improving in the previous days, Gustavo suffered a pulmonary embolism, which caused a significant worsening of his health. The medical report released that day said his condition was "unstable and extremely serious." On the afternoon of the following day, 4 May, a medical report stated that Gustavo's condition was irreversible, but he still had vital signs. He later died that same night, at 9:12 pm (local time), at the age of 42.

Paulo Gustavo's life and career are depicted in the 2026 biographical musical play Meu Filho é Um Musical. The play was written by Fil Braz and directed by Ju Amaral and João Fonseca. Paulo Gustavo is portrayed by actors João Pedro Chaseliov and Pierre Baitelli.

== Filmography ==
=== Television ===
Year	Title	Role	Notes
2006	Prova de Amor	Reveller	Episode: "24 de outubro"
2006	Minha Nada Mole Vida	Bob Calheiros	Episode: "A Chave Mestra"
2006	A Diarista	Comissário Francis	Episode: "Aquele do Avião"
2007	Sítio do Picapau Amarelo	Delegado Lupicínio	
2008	Faça Sua História	Passenger	Episode: "Sob as Ordens de Mamãe"
2008	Casos e Acasos	Vitor / John	Episode: "O Beijo, a Foto e o Empréstimo"; Episode: "Ele é Ela, Ela é Ele e Ela ou Eu"
2011	Divã	Renée	
2011–13; 16	220 Volts	Himself / Various characters	
2012	O Fantástico Mundo de Gregório	Himself	Episode: "Gregório parecido com Marlon Brando?"
2012–15; 2019–20	Prêmio Multishow de Música Brasileira	Presenter	
2013–17; 2019–20	Vai Que Cola	Valdomiro Lacerda Pinto (Valdo)	Protagonist: Season 1-4; Participant: Season 5, 7 and 8
2013–17; 2019–20	Vai Que Cola	Iraci Lacerda Pinto (Angel)	Protagonist: Season 1-4; Participant: Season 5, 7 and 8
2014	Paulo Gustavo na Estrada	Presenter	
2015	Ferdinando Show	Bicha Bichérrima	Episode: "10 de agosto"
2017–21	A Vila	Rique	
2020	220 Volts - Especial de Natal	Various characters	22 December

=== Cinema ===
Year	Title	Role	Notes
2008	A Guerra dos Rocha	Atendente do IML	
2009	Divã	Renée Gama	
2009	Xuxa em O Mistério de Feiurinha	Caio Lacaio	
2013	Minha Mãe é uma Peça	Dona Hermínia Amaral	also screenwriter
2014	Os Homens São de Marte... e É pra lá que Eu Vou	Aníbal	
2015	Vai que Cola – O Filme	Valdomiro Lacerda Pinto (Valdo)	
2016	Minha Mãe é uma Peça 2	Dona Hermínia Amaral	also screenwriter
2017	Fala Sério, Mãe!	Himself	
2018	Minha Vida em Marte	Aníbal	
2019	Minha Mãe é uma Peça 3	Dona Hermínia Amaral	also screenwriter
2020	220 Volts - O Filme	Various characters	
2020	Agente Especial		

=== Music videos ===
Year	Artist	Song
2014	Ana Carolina	"Pole Dance"
2015	Paulo Gustavo	"Bitch I'm Madonna" (Parody promotional for the show 220 Volts)

=== Web ===
Year	Title	Role	Notes
2015	Juninho Play e Família	Dete (voice)	

== Awards and nominations ==
Year	Award	Category	Work	Result	Ref.
2006	Prêmio Shell	Best Actor	Minha Mãe é uma Peça	Nominated	
2007	Prêmio Qualidade Brasil	Best Comedy Theatrical Actor	Minha Mãe é uma Peça	Nominated	
2011	Prêmio Extra de Televisão	Best New Actor	Divã	Nominated	
2013	Meus Prêmios Nick	Favorite Humorist	Minha Mãe é uma Peça	Nominated	
2014	Grande Prêmio do Cinema Brasileiro	Best Adapted Screenplay	Minha Mãe é uma Peça	Nominated	
2014	Meus Prêmios Nick	Favorite Actor	Vai Que Cola	Nominated	
2015	Meus Prêmios Nick	Favorite Humorist	220 Volts	Nominated	
2017	Grande Prêmio do Cinema Brasileiro	Best Adapted Screenplay	Minha Mãe é uma Peça 2	Won	
2018	12° Prêmio Fiesp/Sesi-SP de Cinema e TV	Best Actor	Minha Mãe é uma Peça 2	Nominated	
