= Sempre Livre =

- Origin: Rio de Janeiro, RJ, Brazil
- Genres: Pop rock, new wave
- Years active: 1984-1986, 1991

Sempre Livre ("always free") was a Brazilian pop rock band formed in Rio de Janeiro, only by women. The name of the group mentioned a famous brand of a sanitary pad. In 1984, they recorded their first disk, produced by Ruban, the same of the group As Frenéticas. The greatest hit was the song Eu sou free ("I'm free"), composed by Ruban and Patricia Travassos. The band was over in 1986, but returned five years later with the disk Vícios da Cidade ("city vices"), but only the percussionist stayed from the original formation

== Members ==
- Dulce Quental - changed by Tonia Schubert and after by Denise Mastrangelo - voice
- Márcia - changed by Rosana Piegaia and after by Louise Rabello - guitar
- Flávia Cavaca - bass
- Lelete - changed by Sonia Bonfá and after by Cleo Boechat - organ
- Lúcia Lopes - percussion

== Discography ==
- 1984 - Avião de Combate
- 1991 - Vícios de Cidade

== See also ==
- Música popular brasileira
