= Vai Que Cola =

- Genre: Comedy, Sitcom
- Created by: Leandro Soares
- Starring: Paulo Gustavo
- Opening theme: "Reunião de Bacana", Diogo Nogueira
- Country of origin: Brazil
- Original language: Portuguese
- No. of seasons: 13

Original release
- Network: Multishow
- Release: 8 July 2013 – present

Vai Que Cola is a Brazilian comedy television series broadcast on Multishow. It is one of the longest-running television series in Brazilian history, as well as the most watched comedy on paid TV in the country. The show combines elements of theater and television, with a fixed set and a rotating stage, being shot with a live audience, with whom the cast is encouraged to interact. The series is also well known for its original protagonist, played by famous Brazilian comedian Paulo Gustavo and also for spawning popular memes.

== Premise ==
The fictional show follows Vladomiro Lacerda who, after being convicted of fraud, moves into a boarding house in the suburbs of Rio. Vladomiro is then taken under the wing of the landlady, Dona Jó, who believes he has a good heart.

== Cast ==
- Paulo Gustavo as Valdomiro Lacerda
- Catarina Abdala as Dona Jô
- Marcus Majella as Ferdinando
- Samantha Schmutz as Jéssica
- Fiorella Mattheis as Velna
- Cacau Protásio as Terezinha
- Emiliano D' Ávila as Maicól
- Fernando Caruso as Wilson
- Silvio Guindane as Lacraia
- Oscar Magrini as Brito/Apartment manager
- Werner Schünemann as Lent
- Jonathan Haagensen as Pagodeiro
- Klebber Toledo as himself
- Dani Suzuki as herself
- Flávia Reis as Marli

== Film adaptation ==
A feature film adaptation titled Vai Que Cola - O Filme was released on October 1, 2015.
