= Minha Mãe é uma Peça 2 =

2016 film directed by César Rodrigues

- Brazilian theatrical release poster
- Directed by: César Rodrigues
- Written by: Paulo Gustavo
- Starring: Paulo Gustavo; Mariana Xavier; Rodrigo Pandolfo; Herson Capri; Suely Franco; Samantha Schmütz; Alexandra Richter; Patricya Travassos
- Production companies: Migdal Filmes; Globo Filmes; Paramount Pictures; Universal Pictures
- Distributed by: Downtown Filmes; Paris Filmes
- Release date: December 22, 2016 (Brazil)
- Running time: 96 minutes
- Country: Brazil
- Language: Portuguese
- Budget: R$ 8 million (US$2.5 million)
- Box office: R$ 124 million (US$39 million)

Minha Mãe é uma Peça 2 (English: My Mother Is a Character 2) is a 2016 Brazilian comedy film written and starred by Paulo Gustavo, based on his play of the same name. It is a sequel to the 2013 film Minha Mãe é uma Peça and was produced by Downtown Filmes and Globo Filmes in association with Paramount and Universal Pictures. It was released in Brazil on December 22, 2016, by Migdal and Paris Films.

After its release, the film received mixed to positive reviews, with some critics praising its balance between humor and drama while others criticized the plot for repeating the same formula and not showing evolution from the first film. A sequel, My Mom Is a Character 3, was released on December 26, 2019.

== Plot ==
Dona Hermínia is now a rich and successful talk show host. However, the overprotective mother will have to deal with empty nest syndrome, as Juliano and Marcelina decide to move to São Paulo to live their adult lives. Hermínia struggles to accept the fact that her children are moving away. To balance, Garib, the eldest sibling, arrives with his son, who keeps Mrs. Hermínia busy for a while. She also receives a long visit from her obnoxious older sister Lucia Helena, the black sheep of the family, who has lived in New York for years.

Meanwhile, Juliano starts to think he's actually bisexual instead of gay. Hermínia is also worried about beloved Aunt Zélia, who is now dealing with Alzheimer's disease. The main message of the film is about the feeling of loneliness when your loved ones are not around.

== Cast ==
- Paulo Gustavo as Hermínia
- Mariana Xavier as Marcelina
- Rodrigo Pandolfo as Juliano
- Herson Capri as Carlos Alberto
- Patricya Travassos as Lúcia Helena
- Alexandra Richter as Iesa Amaral Leite
- Suely Franco as Tia Zélia
- Samantha Schmütz as Valdéia
- Rhaisa Batista as Cecília
- Malu Valle as Dona Lourdes
- Ilva Niño as Dona Zezé
- Bruno Bebianno as Garib
- Sérgio Stern as Síndico
- Jorge Lucas as the Doctor

=== Guest starring ===
- Fátima Bernardes as herself
- Carla Prata as prostituta

== Production ==
=== Background ===
After the high box office success of the first film, that had four million spectators, Paulo Gustavo announced he would be working on the sequel.

=== Filming ===
Principal photography started on April 3, 2016, in Rio de Janeiro. The sequel is directed by César Rodrigues, and most of the cast from the first film is present. Patricya Travassos, a new addition to the cast, plays Lúcia Helena, Mrs. Hermínia's older sister that went to live in New York City but comes back to visit her family.

== Reception ==
=== Critical reception ===
Pablo R. Bazarello from Cinepop said that "what is surprising in the sequel is the attention given in the right measure to the dramatic tone surrounding the subplot of Aunt Zélia, increasingly senile and demanding special care. Excerpts, the director César Rodrigues [hits] our feelings, without being mushy or oversentimentalist."

Juca Claudino from Ccine10 wrote: "My Mother Is A Character 2 ends up being a bit boring in some moments of sentimentality... These facts have taken away our interest in the film, an effect that is reduced thanks to Dona Hermínia's humorous performance."

=== Box office ===
The film reached 1 million viewers in its opening weekend. In its second weekend run, the film reached a 3,27 million audience. On January 17, 2017, Paulo Gustavo himself disclosed in his social network that the film already had reached 6 million viewers. On January 30, 2017, comScore data was released, indicating that the film reached the mark of 8 million spectators, reaching the third position on the ranking of most watched films in the history of Brazilian cinema, only behind of Elite Squad: The Enemy Within (2010) and The Ten Commandments: The Movie (2016).

In February 2017, after a seven-week run, it became the highest-grossing film in the history of Brazilian cinema, earning R$124 million (US$39 million, in 2017 dollar).
