= Asdrúbal Trouxe o Trombone =

Asdrúbal Trouxe o Trombone is the name of a Brazilian theatrical group that operated in the 1970s with a comedic and anarchic style.

== History ==
Until the middle of the 1970s, Asdrúbal trouxe o trombone (transl. Asdrúbal brought the trombone) was just an code phrase between actress Regina Casé and her father, Brazilian TV pioneer Geraldo Casé to leave when there was an inconvenience during a meeting or the mood in a party was fading. In these cases, he would say to her "Olha, o Asdrúbal trouxe o trombone", and they would quickly leave the situation. With influences from Monty Python, and led by Casé and Hamilton Vaz Pereira in Rio de Janeiro in 1974, it was made up of a theatre group that helped to create a new generation of talent for Brazilian theatre. The group, defined by their deconstruction of many theatre concepts, inspired many other theatre troupes in Rio, including Companhia Tragicômica Jaz-o-Coração, Banduendes Por Acaso Estrelados, Beijo na Boca, and Diz-Ritmia.

At their debut in 1974, Asdrúbal gained attention for their performance Nikolai Gogol's The Government Inspector, which was noted for its liveliness and for the work of Vaz Pereira as director and for actors Regina Casé and Luís Fernando Guimarães, some of the founders of group. The performance was also known for the production done by Paulo Henrique Doria Simão, or "Conde", who became known for adding to the performances with "non-market clothing".

As indicated by the unorthodox name of the group, Asdrúbal Trouxe o Trombone became a major counterpoint to the ideology of many theatre troupes beginning in the 60s. During the first phase of the group, they interpreted classical works including The Government Inspector and King Ubu by Alfred Jarry in 1975. More than interpreting the text word for word, they wanted to express personal and collective realities. During their performance for King Ubu, they dressed up as clowns, with colorful dresses and a makeup design and adopting language usually used in circuses. The reenactments of these older plays led to the creation of a creative collective called Trate-me Leão in 1977 which became a theatrical phenomenon. The shows that came after, such as Aquela Coisa Toda in 1980 and A Farra da Terra in 1983, offered an open structure to spectators, running contrary with a process where they showed the mechanisms of illusory theatre. In this way, they became part of the Teatro besteirol movement.

The group created a language by way of developing practices through improvisation and collective games, among other methods. Notable members included Patrícia Pillar, Luiz Fernando Guimarães, Patricya Travassos, Evandro Mesquita, Nina de Pádua, Daniel Dantas, Cacá Dionísio, Cazuza, and Gilda Guilhon.

In 2017, a documentary about the troupe, directed by Vaz Pereira, was released.
