= Suely Franco =

Brazilian actress

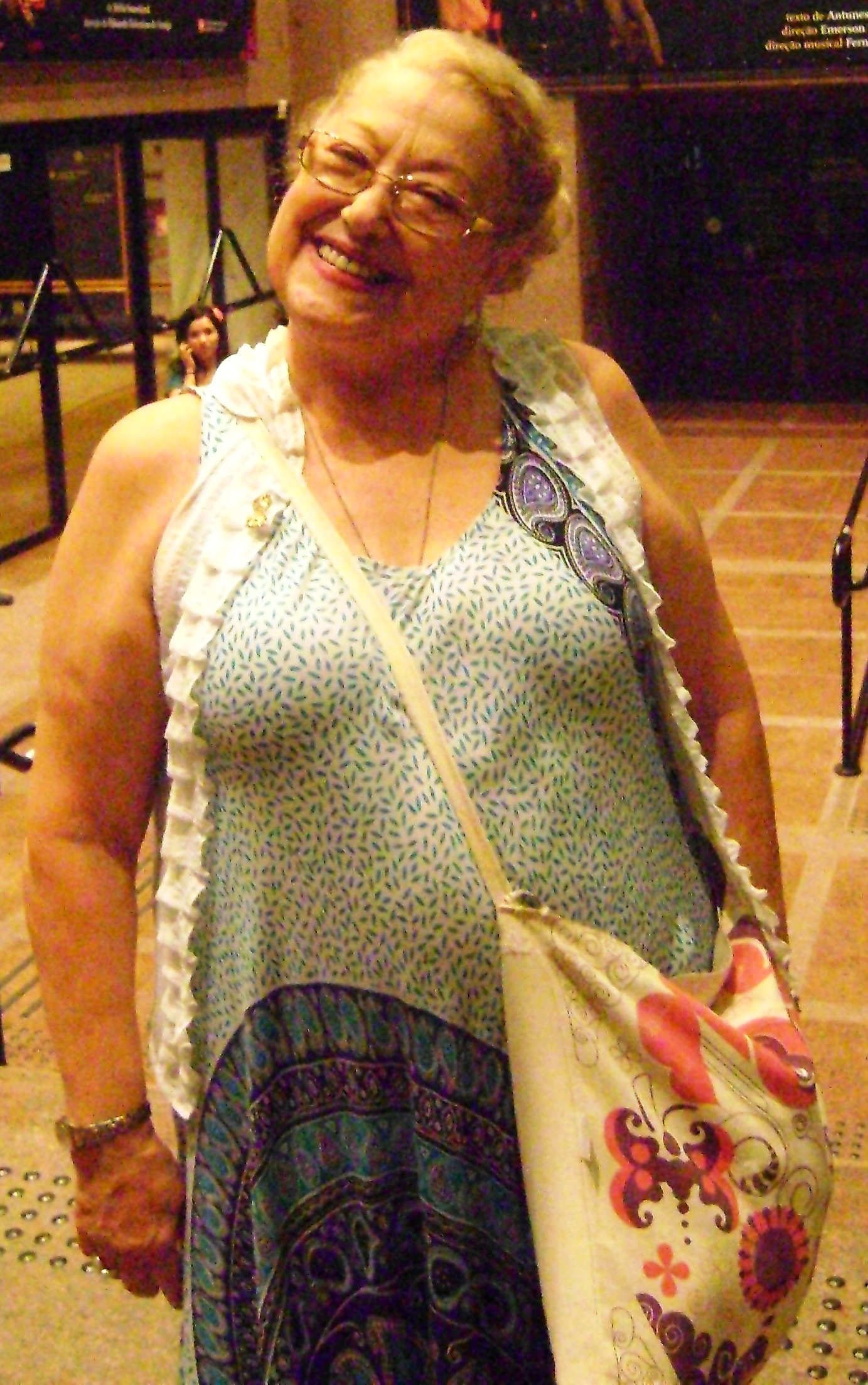
- Born: Suely Franco Mendes; 16 October 1939 (age 86); Rio de Janeiro, Brazil
- Occupation: Actress

Suely Franco (born 16 October 1939) is a Brazilian actress. She was born in Rio de Janeiro. One of her most notable parts is the character Mimosa in O Cravo e a Rosa (2001).

== Filmography ==
Year	Title	Role	Notes
1968	Dois na Lona		
1970	Quatro Contra o Mundo		(segment "Anjo, O")
1974	Motel		
1976	Estúpido Cupido	Irmã Consuelo	TV series
1984	Corpo a Corpo, Todos os Sonhos do Mundo		
1993	Mulheres de Areia	Celina	TV series
1994	Quatro por Quatro		TV series
2000-2001	O Cravo e a Rosa	Mimosa Gomes da Costa	221 episodes
2001	Minha Vida em Suas Mãos	Inês	
2001-2013	A Grande Família	Juva	TV series
2002	Sabor da Paixão	Alba Reis	TV series
2002	Querido Estranho	Roma	
2003	Cristina Quer Casar	Eunice	
2004	Redeemer	Tia de Célio	
2005-2006	Sítio do Picapau Amarelo	Dona Benta	222 episodes
2006	Acredite, um Espírito Baixou em Mim	Amanda	
2008-2009	A Favorita	Geralda	37 episodes
2009-2010	Cama de Gato	Julieta Brandão	136 episodes
2011	Uma Professora Muito Maluquinha	Cida	
2012	Amor Eterno Amor	Zilda	TV series
2013	Minha Mãe é uma Peça	Tia Zélia	
2014	Em Família	Flora	TV series
2014-2018	Detetives do Prédio Azul	Vó Berta	120 episodes
2016	Êta Mundo Bom!	Paulina	161 episodes
2016	Era o Hotel Cambridge	Gilda	
2016	Minha Mãe é uma Peça 2	Tia Zélia	
2017	Eu Fico Loko	Tatiana Figueiredo	
2017	Detetives do Prédio Azul: O Filme	Vó Berta	
2018	Mulheres Alteradas	Mãe de Dudu	Voice
2018	Detetives do Prédio Azul 2: O Mistério Italiano	Vó Berta	
2019	Música para Morrer de Amor	Alice	
2019	A Dona do Pedaço	Marlene	
2025	Dona de Mim	Rosa Boaz	
