= Regina Casé =

Brazilian actress (born 1954)

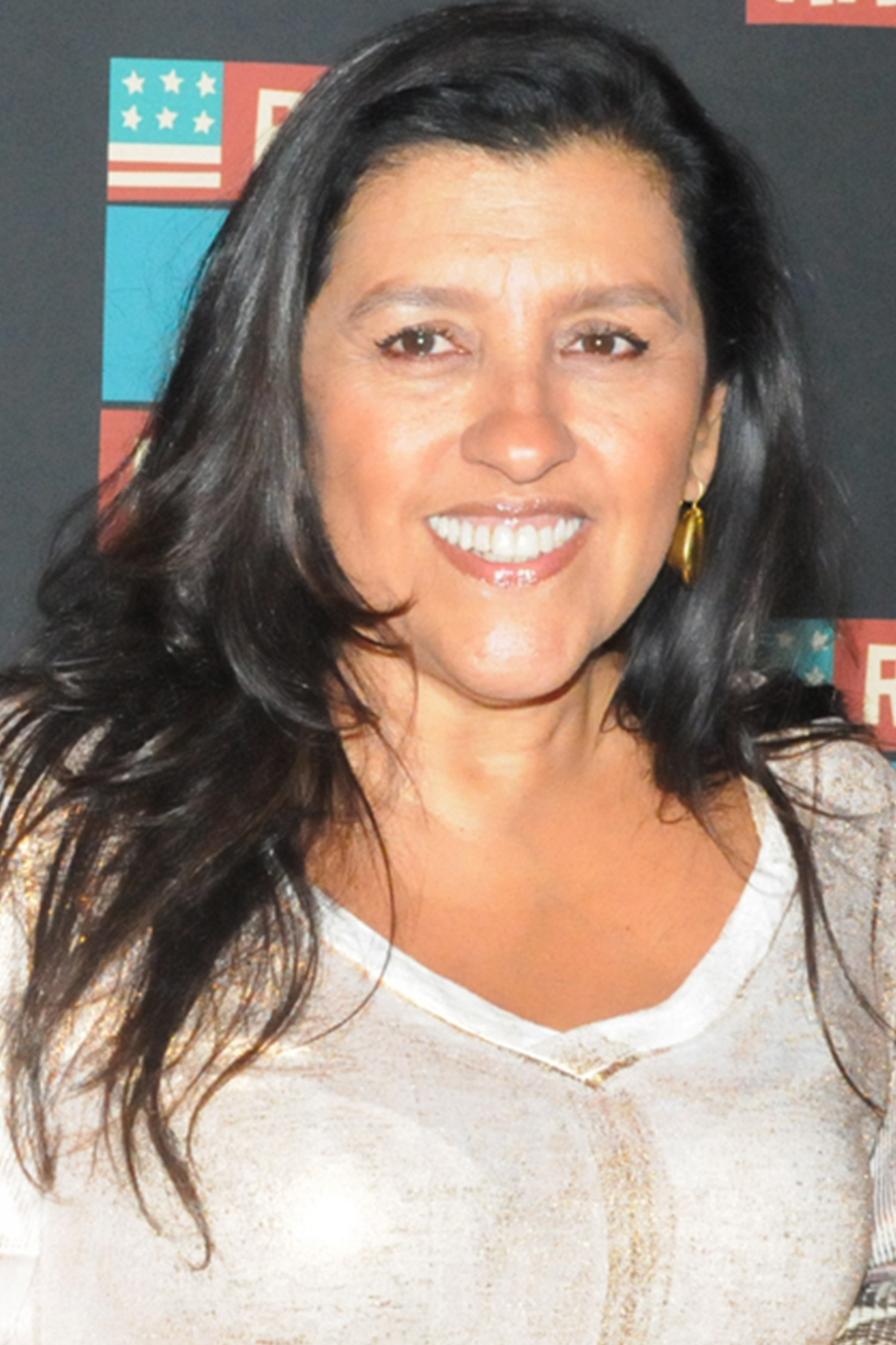
- Casé in 2012
- Born: Regina Maria Barreto Casé; 25 February 1954 (age 72); Rio de Janeiro, Brazil
- Occupations: Actress; screenwriter; director; producer; television presenter
- Years active: 1974–present
- Spouses: Hamilton Vaz Pereira (1973–1977); Estevão Ciavatta (m. 1999)
- Children: 2

Regina Maria Barreto Casé OMC (born 25 February 1954) is a Brazilian actress, screenwriter, director, producer, and television presenter.

== Career ==
In 1974, Casé, together with Hamilton Vaz Pereira, Jorge Alberto Soares, Luiz Arthur Peixoto, and Daniel Dantas, founded a theater company called Asdrúbal Trouxe o Trombone ("Asdrúbal Brought the Trombone") in Rio de Janeiro. The group was influential in the cultural scene of Rio in the late 1970s. The group's debut production was an adaptation of The Inspector General by Nikolai Gogol. For her performance in that production, Casé won the Governor's Prize for breakout actress. Another important production was Trate-me Leão in 1977, which won the Molière Prize.

Casé also began appearing in films in the 1970s, including Chuvas de Verão ("Summer Rains") (1978) directed by Cacá Diegues. Her film career included some of the classics of Brazilian cinema in the 1980s, including Eu Te Amo ("I Love You") (1981) by Arnaldo Jabor, Os Sete Gatinhos ("The Seven Kittens") (1980) by Neville de Almeida, O Segredo da Múmia ("The Mummy's Secret") (1982) by Ivan Cardoso, and A Marvada Carne (1985) by André Klotzel. Other film work in the 1980s included Cinema Falado ("Spoken Cinema") (1986) by Caetano Veloso; O Grande Mentecapto ("The Big Lunatic") (1989) by Oswaldo Caldeira; and Eu, Tu, Eles ("Me, You, Them") (2001), by Andrucha Waddington. She also appeared in the American film, Moon Over Parador ("Luar sobre Parador") (1988) by Paul Mazursky.

In 1983, Casé made her television debut on the Globo network telenovela Guerra dos Sexos ("War of the Sexes") by Sílvio de Abreu. In that same year she was also appearing in the children's program Sítio do Pica Pau Amarelo ("Yellow Woodpecker Farm"), at that time directed by her father, Geraldo Casé. In 1984, she joined the cast of Vereda Tropical ("Tropical sidewalk") by Carlos Lombardi, and appeared in the children's program Plunct, Plact, Zuuum II.

She gained notoriety in the group Asdrúbal Trouxe o Trombone and in the sitcom TV Pirata. In the 1990s she presented the TV shows Programa Legal, Brasil Legal and Muvuca on Rede Globo. Nowadays she's on Futura channel and in Central da Periferia on Rede Globo, firstly a sketch at Fantástico. In 2016, she appeared in the Olympic games opening ceremonies as part of a showcase of Brazilian pop culture.

Casé is the daughter of producer, director, and writer Geraldo Casé, with other members of her family including her uncle, architect Paulo Casé, and grandfather, pioneering radio personality Ademar Casé. From 1973 to 1977, she was married to Vaz Pereira. She has been married to Estevão Ciavatta since 1999.

== Filmography ==
=== Television ===
Year	Title	Role	Notes
1980	Sítio do Picapau Amarelo	Dona Formiga	Episode: "A Rainha das Abelhas"
1982–1983	Chico Anysio Show	Neide Taubaté	
1984	Guerra dos Sexos	Carlotinha Bimbatti	Episode dated: "7 January 1984"
1984	Sítio do Picapau Amarelo	Deolinda	Episode: "A Reinação do Esperto Come Esperto"
1984	Vereda Tropical	Clotilde Barbosa	Episodes dated: "23 July–2 August"
1984	Plunct, Plact, Zuuum... 2	Madrasta de Marinela	End of year special
1986	Os Trapalhões	Cleopatra	Episode dated: "18 February"
1986	Cambalacho	Albertina Pimenta (Tina Pepper)	
1988–1990	TV Pirata	Various	
1991–1992	Programa Legal	Herself	
1991	Escolinha do Professor Raimundo: Especial 25 Anos	Dona Bela	End of year special
1994	Fantástico	Reporter	Quadro: Na Geral
1995–1997	Brasil Legal	Herself / Presenter	
1996–1997	Canal Brasil: Escola Legal	Herself / Presenter	
1997	Vida ao Vivo Show	Various	Episode dated: "21 July"
1998	Histórias do Brasil Legal	Herself / Presenter	
1998–2000	Muvuca	Herself / Presenter	
2001	As Filhas da Mãe	Rosalva Rocha Cavalcante	
2001	Os Normais	Leonora Vorski	Episódio: "Ler é Normal"
2001–2011	Um Pé de Quê?	Herself / Presenter	
2002	Fantástico	Reporter	Quadro: "Que História É Essa?"
2003	Cena Aberta	Herself / Presenter / Various	Also writer and director
2004	Fantástico	Herself / Reporter	Quadro: "São Paulo de Piratininga"
2005	Cidade dos Homens	Herself	Episode: "Em Algum Lugar do Futuro"
2006	Central da Periferia	Herself / Presenter	
2006–2007	Fantástico	Reporter	Quadro: Minha Periferia
2007	Amazônia, de Galvez a Chico Mendes	Maria	
2008	Ciranda de Pedra	Eunice Jardim	Episodes dated: "30 August – 6 September"
2009	Som & Fúria	Graça	
2009	Fantástico	Reporter	Quadro: "Vem com Tudo"
2010	Papai Noel Existe	Francis	End of year special
2011–2017	Esquenta!	Herself / Presenter	
2012	Cheias de Charme	Herself	Episódios: "22–23 de junho"
2016	Fantástico	Herself / Presenter	Quadro: "Fonte da Juventude"
2017	Palavras em Série	Clarice Lispector	Episode dated: "30 December"
2017	Asdrúbal Trouxe o Trombone	Herself	
2019–2021	Amor de Mãe	Lurdes dos Santos Silva	
2022–2023	Todas as Flores	Zoé da Cruz	
2023	Projeto Led: Luz na Educação	Herself / Presenter	
2024	Tô Nessa	Mirinda	

As director/screenwriter

Year	Title	Notes
2002	Cidade dos Homens	Episode: "Uólace e João Victor"
2003	Cidade dos Homens	Episode: "Tem Que Ser Agora"
2004	Cidade dos Homens	Episode: "Pais e Filhos"
2005	Cidade dos Homens	Episode: "As Aparências Enganam"

=== Film ===
Year	Title	Role	Notes
1978	Tudo Bem	Vera Lúcia	
1978	A Summer Rain	Moça da Repartição	
1980	Os Sete Gatinhos	Arlete	
1981	I Love You	Mulher de Valdir	
1981	Corações a Mil	Suzete	
1982	O Segredo da Múmia	Regina	
1983	Onda Nova	Rubi	
1985	Brás Cubas	Marcela	
1985	Areias Escaldantes	Veronica Pinheiro	
1985	A Marvada Carne	Mulher-Diaba	
1986	O Cinema Falado	Comunista	
1988	Fogo e Paixão		
1988	Moon Over Parador	Clara	
1989	O Grande Mentecapto	Brigite	
1995	Lá e Cá	Garota	Short film
1997	A Perna Cabiluda	Herself	Short film
2000	Me You Them	Darlene	
2001	Onde Andará Petrucio Felker?	Maria das Graças	Short film, voice
2003	A Pessoa É Para o Que Nasce	Herself	Documentary
2004	Juro que vi: O Boto	Narrator	Short film
2014	Rio, I Love You	Judite	Segment: "Dona Fulana"
2014	Made in China	Francis	
2015	The Second Mother	Valdirene Ferreira (Val)	
2019	Three Summers	Madalena	
2024	Dona Lurdes: O Filme	Dona Lurdes	

=== Videography ===
Year	Title	Artist	Album
1988	'O Estrangeiro"	Caetano Veloso	Estrangeiro
