= 220 Volts =

- Genre: comedy, satire
- Country of origin: Brazil
- Original language: Portuguese
- No. of seasons: 5
- No. of episodes: 62

Production
- Producer: Felipe Braz

Original release
- Release: October 25, 2011 – December 26, 2020

220 Volts is a Brazilian sketch comedy series, shown on the paid television channel Multishow, which premiered on October 25, 2011, and ran until October 6, 2016, produced by Migdal Filmes and presented by actor and comedian Paulo Gustavo who died in 2021.

== Exhibition ==
An unprecedented episode was shown on Rede Globo as a year-end special on December 22, 2020 and re-aired on December 26 on the Multishow channel.

On May 4, 2021, TV Globo replayed the special as a tribute to actor Paulo Gustavo, who died as a result of COVID-19.

== Plot ==
The program is presented on a theater stage and the theme is about unusual, embarrassing and comical situations portraying everyday life always using characters created by the actor.

== Seasons ==
In the first season, 13 episodes were recorded with 12 hours of daily recordings over 18 days. The first season was an absolute success, having the highest audience for Pay TV programs. It was released on double DVD, by AMZ Mídia, in 2012.

The recordings took place in February and premiered with 13 episodes on April 24 with 11 new characters, including "Anjo Gabriel" and "Mulher de Época". The attraction continued with production by Migdal Filmes and texts by Paulo Gustavo and Fil Braz.

The third season, which premiered on October 23, 2012, was themed around New York City.

The preview of the fourth season was shown on the Multishow website on April 8, 2013, one day before the official premiere on the channel. Unlike the previous theme, the program's central theme was the city of Búzios. According to the program's director himself, 220 Volts has an improvisation that ends up bringing "a freshness that the public notices".
