= Blitz (Brazilian band) =

Brazilian rock band

- Origin: Rio de Janeiro
- Genres: Brazilian rock
- Years active: 1981–1986; 1994–present
- Members: Evandro Mesquita; Billy Forghieri; Juba; Andréa Coutinho; Nicole Cyrne; Alana Alberg
- Past members: Fernanda Abreu; Maíra Charken; Rogério Meanda

Blitz is a Brazilian rock band, formed in 1981 in Rio de Janeiro. The band was the first to achieve mainstream success and to have hit singles (Você não soube me amar, A dois passos do paraíso, Ana Maria (biquíni de bolinha amarelinha tão pequenininho)) kick–starting the 1980s movement that would later be called "BRock". Its "classic" formation included Evandro Mesquita (voice), Lobão (drums, later Roberto "Juba" Gurgel), Antônio Pedro Fortuna (bass, formerly with Os Mutantes and Lulu Santos), William Forghieri (keyboards) and Fernanda Abreu and Márcia Bulcão (backing vocals). Their Aventuras II album was nominated for the 2017 Latin Grammy Award for Best Portuguese Language Rock or Alternative Album.

Guitarist Rogério Meanda died on 25 August 2025.

== Discography ==
=== Studio albums ===
- (1982) As Aventuras da Blitz
- (1983) Radio Atividade
- (1984) Blitz 3
- (1997) Línguas
- (2009) Eskute Blitz
- (2016) Aventuras II
- (2023) Supernova
- (2025) NuDusOutros

=== Live albums ===
- (1994) Blitz ao Vivo
- (2007) Blitz ao Vivo e a Cores
- (2010) Eskute & Veja Blitz
- (2013) Multishow Registro: Blitz 30 Anos – Ipanema
- (2017) Blitz no Circo Voador

== Members ==
=== Current formation ===
- Evandro Mesquita : vocals, acoustic guitar, electric guitar (1981–1986; 1994–present)
- Billy Forghieri: keyboards (1982–1986; 1994 – present)
- Juba: drums and backing vocals (1982–1986; 1994 – present)
- Andréa Coutinho: backing vocals (2003–present)
- Nicole Cyrne: backing vocals (2014–present)
- Alana Alberg: bass (2022–present)

=== Former members ===
- Rogerio Meanda: guitar and backing vocals (2005–2025; his death)
- Guto Barros : guitar (1981; died 2018)
- Junior Homrich: bass (1981)
- Zé Luís: saxophone (1981)
- Arnaldo Brandão: bass (1981)
- Katia B: backing vocals (1981)
- Lobão: drums (1981–1982)
- Fernanda Abreu: backing vocals (1982–1986)
- Márcia Bulcão: backing vocals (1981–1985; 1994–1995)
- Hannah Lima: backing vocals (1994–1995)
- Eliane Tassis: backing vocals (1997–1998)
- Ricardo Barreto: guitar and backing vocals (1981–1985; 1994–1999)
- Antônio Pedro: bass and backing vocals (1982–1986; 1994–1999)
- Carla Moraes: backing vocals (1997–1999)
- Germana Guilhermme: backing vocals (1997–2000)
- Fábio Lessa: bass (1999–2000)
- Patrícia Mello: backing vocals (2000)
- Leonardo Lira: guitar (2000)
- Maíra Charken: backing vocals (2003–2004)
- Lancaster Pinto: bass (2003–2004)
- Fernando Monteiro: guitar (2003–2005; substitute 2001)
- Luciana Spedo: backing vocals (2004–2010)
- Mari Salvaterra: backing vocals (2010–2012)
- Giovanna Cursino: backing vocals (2012–2014)
- Cláudia Niemeyer: bass (1981, 2005–2022)

=== Substitute musicians ===
- André Carneiro: bass (2022)
