= Vai Que Cola: O Filme =

2015 Brazilian film directed by César Rodrigues

- Film poster
- Based on: Vai Que Cola
- Starring: Paulo Gustavo
- Release date: October 1, 2015
- Country: Brazil
- Language: Portuguese
- Box office: R$8.3 million

Vai Que Cola: O Filme is a 2015 Brazilian comedy film based on the television series Vai Que Cola. It was released on October 1, 2015.

== Plot ==
Valdomiro Lacerda moves to Leblon.

== Cast ==
- Paulo Gustavo as Valdomiro Lacerda

== Reception ==
The film was number-one on its opening weekend, with R$8.3 million.
