= Luiz Fernando Guimarães =

Brazilian actor (born 1949)

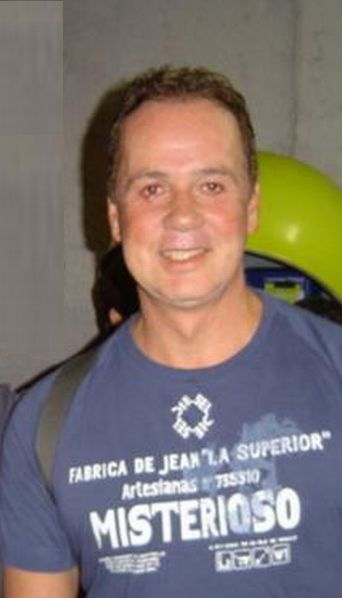
- Born: November 28, 1949 (age 76); Rio de Janeiro, Brazil
- Occupation: Actor

Luiz Fernando Guimarães (born November 28, 1949, in Rio de Janeiro, Brazil) is a Brazilian actor.

At the beginning of the 1980s, he participated in the Asdrúbal Trouxe o Trombone, a group of actors from Rio de Janeiro who wrote, produced, and performed their plays. Regina Casé, Evandro Mesquita, Patricya Travassos, among others, were his mates at Asdrubal. Luiz Fernando and the Asdrubal were very popular and successful.

During the 2000s, he became famous country-wide performing TV ads to a government bank. He is famous for his role in Os Normais.
