= Os Normais =

Brazilian television series

- Genre: Situation comedy
- Created by: Jorge Furtado; Alexandre Machado; Fernanda Young
- Directed by: José Alvarenga Jr.
- Starring: Fernanda Torres; Luiz Fernando Guimarães
- Theme music composer: Lindomar Castilho
- Opening theme: Doida Demais
- Country of origin: Brazil
- Original language: Portuguese
- No. of series: 3
- No. of episodes: 71

Production
- Running time: 30 min.

Original release
- Network: Rede Globo
- Release: 1 June 2001 – 3 October 2003

Related
- Os Normais (movie)

Os Normais (in Portuguese, literally "The Normal Ones") is a Brazilian sitcom directed by José Alvarenga Jr. and written by Jorge Furtado, Alexandre Machado, and Fernanda Young. It aired from 2001 to 2003 on Rede Globo. It features a lot of nonsensical situations, unpredictable stories and wild, often explicit humour. The sitcom was adapted in 2003 into a film titled Os Normais, O Filme (distributed as "So Normal" in some countries), which received the sequel Os Normais 2 - A Noite Mais Maluca de Todas in 2009.

== Plot ==
Rui (Luiz Fernando Guimarães) is engaged to Vani (Fernanda Torres). Although they spend most of their time together in the same apartment, they live in separate ones in Rio de Janeiro where strange situations take place with different guests in each episode.

In 2003, during the third and last season, the series introduced two new characters, Bernardo (Selton Mello) and Maristela (Graziella Moretto).

== Episodes ==
=== First Season ===
1. "Todos São Normais" (Everybody Is Normal)
2. "Normas do Clube" (Club's Rules)
3. "Brigar É Normal (Fighting Is Normal)
4. "Trair é Normal" (Cheating Is Normal)
5. "Um Dia Normal" (A Normal Day)
6. "Faça o Seu Pedido Normal" (Order Your Normal Wish)
7. "Mal-entendido É Normal" (Misunderstandings are Normal)
8. "Sair com Amigos É Normal" (Hanging out with Friends Is Normal )
9. "Implicância É Normal" (Finding Fault is Normal)
10. "Ler É Normal" (Reading is Normal)
11. "Fazer as Pazes é Normal" (Making Up is Normal)
12. "Complicar É Normal" (Confusion is Normal)
13. "Surpresas são Normais" (Surprises are Normal)
14. "Estresse É Normal" (Stress Is Normal)
15. "Um Sábado Normal" (A Normal Saturday)
16. "Mentir é Normal" (Lying is Normal)
17. "Desconfiar É Normal" (Distrust is Normal)
18. "Um Pouco de Cultura É Normal" (Some Culture Is Normal)
19. "Grilar é Normal" (Stridency is Normal)
20. "Cair na Rotina É Normal" (Falling into a Routine is Normal)
21. "Tentações São Normais" (Temptations Are Normal)
22. "Dar Um Tempo é Normal" (A Break is Normal)
23. "Um Pouco de Azar é Normal" (A little of Bad luck is Normal)
24. "Desesperar É Normal" (Despair is Normal)
25. "De Volta ao Normal" (Back to Normal)
26. "Seguir a Tradição É Normal" (Following Tradition is Normal)

=== Second Season ===
1. "Tudo Normal como Antes" (As Normal as Always)
2. "O Tipo da Coisa Normal" (The Normal Kind of Thing)
3. "Uma Tarde de Sábado Normal" (A Normal Saturday Afternoon)
4. "Enlouquecer Domingo É Normal" (Going Crazy on Sunday is Normal)
5. "Uma Amizade Normal" (A Normal Friendship)
6. "Confusões São Normais" (Confusions Are Normal)
7. "Ter Filhos é Normal" (Having Children is Normal)
8. "Viajar É Normal" (Traveling is Normal)
9. "Mais do Que Normal" (More Than Normal)
10. "Desconfianças Normais" (Normal Distrusts)
11. "Um Machismo Normal" (A Normal Male Sexism)
12. "Umas Loucuras Normais" (Some Normal Craziness)
13. "Um Programinha Normal" (A Normal Date)
14. "Ser Mau É Normal" (Misbehavior is Normal)
15. "É Nojento, Mas É Normal" (It's Disgusting, But It's Normal)
16. "Parece Indecente, Mas É Normal" (It Looks Indecent, But It's Normal)
17. "O Normal A Ser Feito" (The Normal Stuff To Do)
18. "Horrivelmente Normal" (Horribly Normal)
19. "Acima do Normal" (Beyond Normal)
20. "Sensações Normais" (Normal Sensations)
21. "Tudo Normal Até Que..." (Everything's Normal Until...)
22. "Acordando Normalmente" (Awakening Normally)
23. "Divertimento Normal e Sadio" (Normal and Healthy Fun)
24. "Uma Experiência Normal" (A Normal Experience)
25. "Questionamentos Normais" (Normal Questions)
26. "Gente Normal e Civilizada" (Normal and Civilized People)
27. "Motivos Normais" (Normal Reasons)
28. "Especialmente Normal" (Especially Normal)

=== Third Season ===
1. "A Volta dos Que Não Foram" (The Return of Those Who Never Went)
2. "É Uma Questão de Química, Entende?" (It's a Chemistry Thing, You Know?)
3. "Sexo, Só Semana Que Vem." (Sex, Just Next Week)
4. "Casal Que Vive Brigando Não Tem Crise" (A Couple that is always fighting is never in crisis)
5. "As Taras Que o Tarado Tara" (What the Pervert is Into)
6. "O Dia Em Que Vani Pirou" (The Day Vani Went Crazy)
7. "Ter Respeito É Trair Direito" (Respect Is Cheating Properly)
8. "Nosso Já Famoso Episódio Infame" (Our Already Famous Infamous Episode)
9. "Sonho de Uma Noite de Serão" (An Overtime's Night Dream)
10. "Querer é Poder" (You've got the power)
11. "O Grande Segredo de Rui" (Rui's Great Secret)
12. "As Outras Vidas de Rui" (Rui's Other Lives)
13. "A Vingança da CDF" (The Revenge of the Geek)
14. "Os Estranhos Lugares Comuns" (The Strange Common Places)
15. "O Magnífico Antepenúltimo" (The Magnificent Antepenultimate)
16. "Até Que Enfim Profundos" (Finally Deep)
17. "Terminar é Normal" (It Is Normal to End)
