= Alexandra Richter =

Brazilian actress (born 1967)

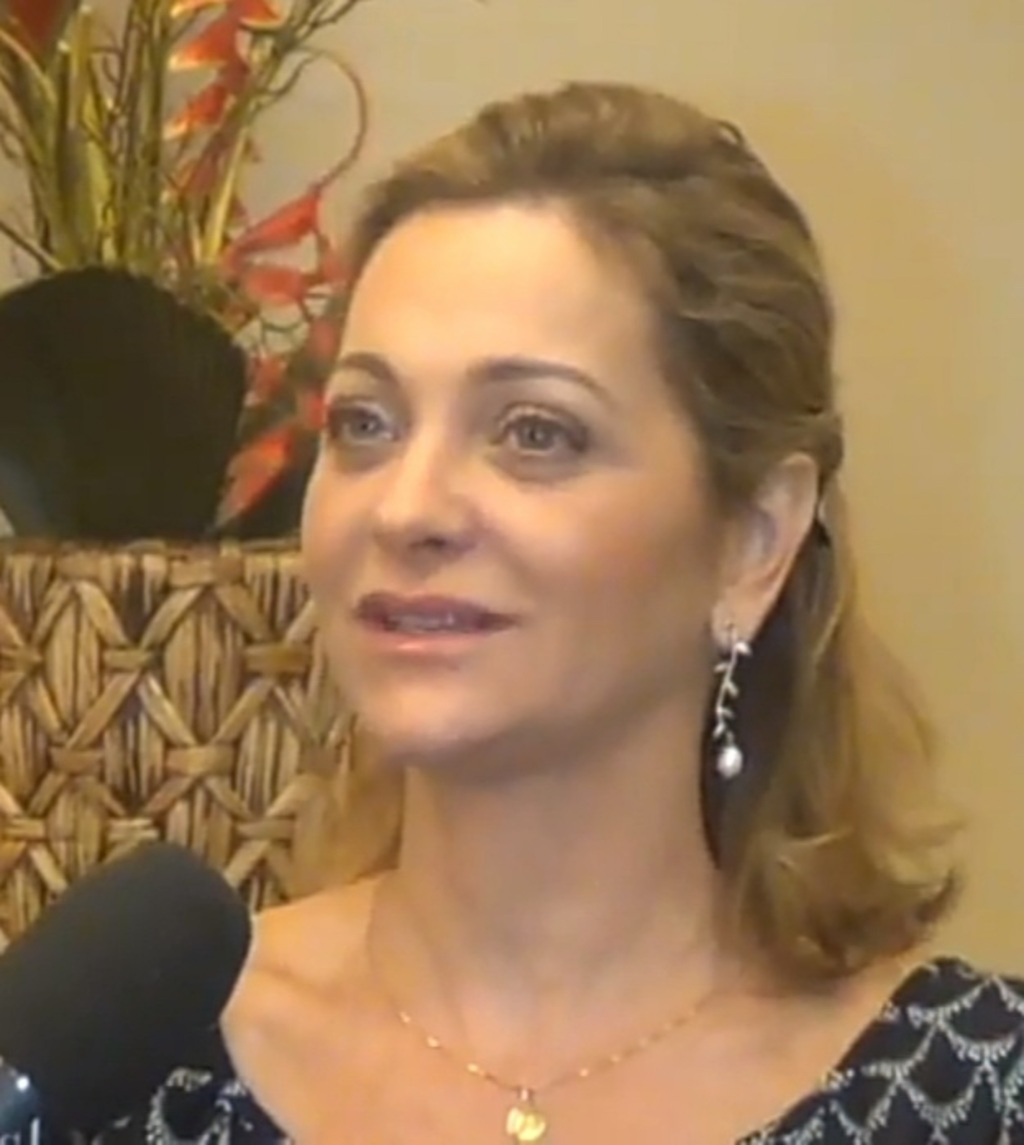
- Richter in 2012
- Born: 5 June 1967 (age 58); Rio de Janeiro, Brazil
- Occupation: Actress
- Years active: 1992–present
- Spouse: Ronaldo Braga (m. 1997)
- Children: 1

Alexandra Richter Barbosa da Fonseca (born 5 June 1967) is a Brazilian actress.

== Selected filmography ==
- Chico Total (1996)
- Mandacaru (1997)
- Por Amor (1997)
- Laços de Família (2000)
- Coração de Estudante (2002)
- A Diarista (2005)
- Zorra Total (2005-2009)
- Passione (telenovela) (2010)
- Os Caras de Pau (2011)
- Cheias de Charme (2012)
- Malhação (2013)
- Boogie Oogie (2014)
- A Regra do Jogo (2015)
- Além da Ilusão (2022)
- Família é Tudo (2024)

== Awards and nominations ==
Year	Award	Category	Work	Result	Ref
2014	Grande Prêmio do Cinema Brasileiro	Melhor Atriz Coadjuvante	Minha Mãe é uma Peça: O Filme	Nominated	
