= Paris Filmes =

Brazilian film studio

- Type: Private
- Founded: 1960
- Founder: Sandi Adamiu
- Headquarters: São Paulo, São Paulo, Brazil
- Area served: Brazil
- Services: Distribution of films
- Divisions: Paris Entretenimento
- Subsidiaries: Globalgate Entertainment; Gullane Produções
- Website: www.parisfilmes.com.br

Paris Filmes (stylized as PARIS FILMES) is a Brazilian film distribution and production company which distributes movies in cinemas, DVD and Blu-ray.

Founded in 1960 by the Romanian immigrant Sandi Adamiu, the company began distributing the films of the French studio Pathé. In the 1980s, Paris acquired the VHS distributor América Vídeo, which specialized in action films. In the late 2000's, Paris distributed the Twilight and Hunger Games film series, making the studio first place in market share in 2012/13.

In May 2021, Paris announced the launch in Brazil of Cining, a service that allows cinema networks to create virtual movie theaters. It was created by Carlos Hansen, president and CEO of Chilean film distributor BF Distribution. The following month, Paris Filmes released Midsommar in limited and definitive edition on Blu-ray in partnership with Versátil Home Vídeo. Initially, a print run of 1,000 copies was authorized, then another 500 copies were added to the stock. Due to the contract, the editions were officially sold only on the Versátil Home Vídeo webshop.

In May 2022, it announced the release of 61 Brazilian films that will be released in the country from July 2022 to December 2025.

In 2023 and 2024, Paris Filmes distributed in Brazil The Three Musketeers: D’Artagnan (2023), The Three Musketeers: Milady (2024) and The Count of Monte Cristo (2024), three films produced by Pathé, thus renewing ties with the French studio that had largely contributed to the launch of Paris Filmes in the 1960s
