= Luíza Tomé =

Brazilian actress (born 1961)

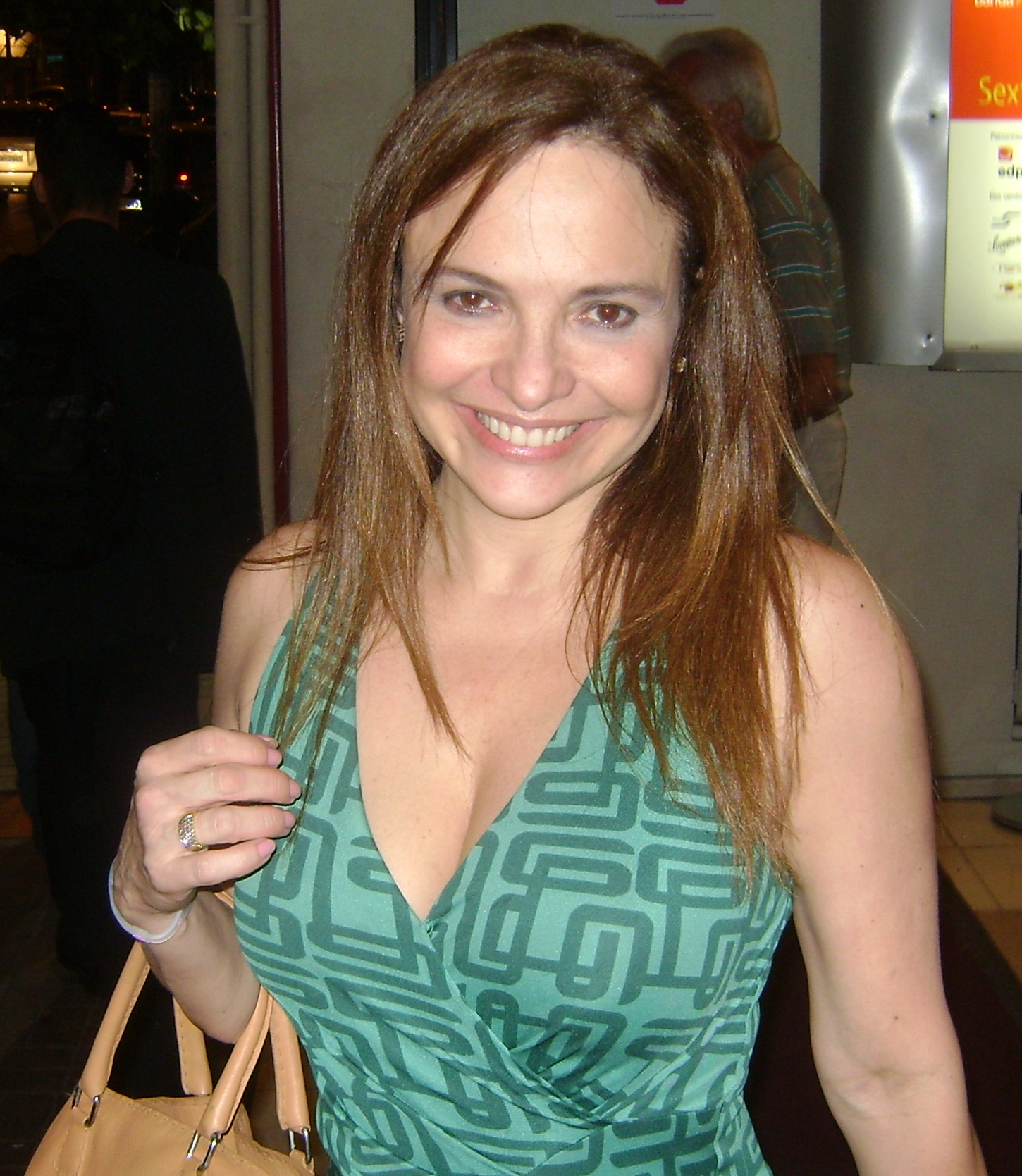
- Luíza Tomé in december 2010
- Born: Luíza Francineide Coutinho Tomé; May 10, 1961 (age 65); Itapipoca, Brazil
- Occupation: Actress
- Years active: 1978–present
- Spouses: Mário Márcio Bandarra (m. 1988; div. 1991) Adriano Facchini (m. 1994; div. 2012)
- Children: 3
- Website: www.luizatome.com

Luíza Francineide Coutinho Tomé (born May 10, 1961 in Amontada) is a Brazilian actress. She was raised in Itapipoca. She is best known for acting in Globo telenovelas through the 1990s and early 2000s, including Pedra sobre Pedra, A Indomada and Porto dos Milagres. She has also appeared in film and theatre.

== Career ==
Tomé's first television appearance was in the 1978 Rede Globo (Globe Network) telenovela Dancin' Days, in a non-speaking minor role in episode 154. In a small scene, she appears for a few seconds next to one of the main characters, Raul (Eduardo Tornaghi) at a New Year's Eve party.

Tomé began acting in television in 1984 when she appeared in the Globo telenovela Corpo a Corpo, which she followed with a starring role in the low-budget 1985 musical film Tropclip. Success did not come until 1989 when she played Carol in the telenovela Tieta.

In 1990, she appeared with Carlos Alberto Riccelli and Vera Fischer in the miniseries Riacho Doce. Through the 1990s, she appeared in the Globo telenovelas Pedra sobre Pedra, Fera Ferida and A Indomada, among others. Tomé also made several appearances on the long-running show Você Decide, where viewers chose the ending.

In 2001, Tomé caught the attention of the media for her portrayal of Rosa Palmeirão in Porto dos Milagres. Her last role for Globo was in the telenovela Começar de Novo as Lúcia Borges.

In 2006, she joined Rede Record (Record Network), in the productions Cidadão Brasileiro and Luz do Sol, and the series Os Óculos de Pedro Antão. In 2009, she portrayed Samantha in the comedy Bela, a Feia (Bela, the Ugly).

In 2010, Tomé returned to the theater with the show Mulheres Alteradas opposite Mel Lisboa, Daniele Valente and André Bankoff.

In 2012, she appeared in the telenovela Máscaras. In 2013, Tomé portrayed former model Meg Pantaleão in Dona Xepa. In 2014, she participated in the episode "Milagres em Genesaré", of the miniseries Milagres de Jesus.

In 2016, Tomé returned to play a pimp in Escrava Mãe. She played Rosalinda Pavão, who owns a brothel that moves Rio de Janeiro in 1808. In 2017, Tomé returned to RecordTV to play Letícia, the mother of the protagonist, Zoé (Juliana Knust), in the telenovela Apocalipse.

In 2018, she returned to Rede Globo, where she played Scarleth Williams Mackenzie Pitiguary, in the telenovela O Sétimo Guardião.

== Personal life ==
Tomé was married to businessman Adriano Facchini, but they separated in January 2012 after 17 years of marriage. They have three children together.

== Filmography ==
=== Television ===
Year	Title	Role	Notes
1984	Corpo a Corpo	Alice Gouveia	
1987	Armação Ilimitada	Daughter of Count Dracula	Episode: "Drácula Não Morreu"
1988	Armação Ilimitada		Episode: "Totalmente Demais"
1989	Tieta	Carolina (Carol)	
1990	Riacho Doce	Francisca	
1992	Pedra sobre Pedra	Vida	
1992	Você Decide		Episode: "A Cantada"
1992	Especial Leandro & Leonardo		Special year-end
1993	Você Decide	Vanete	Episode: "Se Acaso Você Chegasse"
1993	Fera Ferida	Maria dos Remédios	
1994	Você Decide		Episode: "A Expulsão do Paraíso"
1995	Pátria Minha	Isabel Nogueira	Episodes: "February 14–March 10, 1995"
1995	Você Decide		Episode: "Pela Estrada da Vida"
1996	Quem É Você?	Cíntia Tavares	
1996	Você Decide		Episode: "A Pequena Herdeira"
1997	A Indomada	Scarleth Williams Mackenzie Pitiguary	
1998	Você Decide		Episode: "Don Juan do Rio"
1999	Você Decide	Eleuzina	Episode: "O Califa de Caruaru"
1999	O Belo e as Feras	Marcinha	Episode: "Azar no Jogo, Pior no Amor"
1999	Vila Madalena	Raquel	
2001	Porto dos Milagres	Rosa Palmeirão	
2001	Sai de Baixo	Bia	Episode: "A Mandinga do Tempo"
2002	Brava Gente	Lola	Episode: "O Enterro da Cafetina"
2004	Começar de Novo	Lúcia Borges	
2006	Cidadão Brasileiro	Tereza Castro	
2007	Luz do Sol	Maria Stella Alcântara Diniz	
2008	Os Óculos de Pedro Antão	Dona Camila	Special year-end
2009	Bela, a Feia	Samantha di Freitas	
2012	Máscaras	Geraldine Aidan	
2013	Dona Xepa	Meg Pantaleão	
2013	Casamento Blindado	Edna	Special year-end
2014	Milagres de Jesus	Carmela	Episode: "Milagres em Genesaré"
2016	Escrava Mãe	Rosalinda Pavão	
2017	Apocalipse	Letícia Santero	
2018	O Sétimo Guardião	Scarleth Williams Mackenzie Pitiguary	Episodes: "November 21–March 19"
2019	Dança dos Famosos	Contestant	Season 16
2022	Cine Holliúdy	Madalena Joyce	Episode: "October 4"
2024	A Caverna Encantada	Dalete Alves	

=== Film ===
Year	Title	Role
1985	Tropclip	
1991	Inspetor Faustão e o Mallandro	
1997	Ed Mort	Silva 4
1997	O Cangaceiro	Maria Bonita
2015	Anjo de Cabelos Longos	Rafael's mother
2022	#PartiuFama	Laura
2022	Nunca Fomos Tão Modernos	Laura
2024	Licença para Enlouquecer	Nahimana
