= Mônica Carvalho =

Brazilian actress and former model

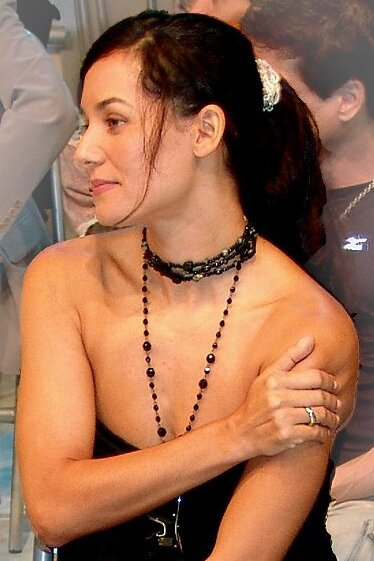
- Carvalho in 2005
- Born: Mônica Rodrigues Carvalho; March 28, 1971 (age 55); Rio de Janeiro, Brazil
- Occupations: Actress; former model
- Spouse: Alaor Paris Júnior (m. 2009)
- Modelling information
- Height: 166 cm (5 ft 5 1/2 in)
- Hair colour: Black
- Eye colour: Green
- Website: http://www.monicacarvalho.com

Mônica Rodrigues Carvalho (born March 28, 1971, in Rio de Janeiro) is a Brazilian actress and former model.

== Biography ==
She is the daughter of retired Polish descent Sérgio Carvalho and his wife, originally from Bahia and Portugal, Mary of Graces. She is the sister of the merchant, Sérgio Ricardo.

== Career ==
The Rio's Barra da Tijuca, Mônica Carvalho began her modeling career at age 13, as she liked to sunbathe on the beach, she was invited to be the poster girl for a brand of sunscreen, then held other advertising campaigns. At age 16 she was voted "muse Summer River" in 1991 won the "Scorpion Girl," a Brazilian nightclub in the United States. At the age of 19 she decided to pursue a modeling career seriously, joining Ford Models. At the same time took courses in theater at City College and in the House of Art Laranjeiras (CAL). She studied acting in New York City where he lived.

Her professional debut came in 1993, the play's Brazil Underwear. That same year she attended the opening of said second version of the novel Mulheres de Areia, appeared in an episode of Confissões de Adolescente in TV Cultura. In 1994 came the Actors Workshop of the Globo and had a cameo in Quatro por Quatro, as the girlfriend of the player Renato Gaúcho. Still worked on Rede Globo soap operas História de Amor, Chocolate com Pimenta among others, also gave two characters Malhação as well as episodes of the series A Vida Como Ela É..., and the program appears in Fantastic Você Decide, achieved tremendous success in 2001 as the Porto dos Milagres Maria do Socorro (Socorrinho).

It was the cover of magazines Plástica & Beleza, Boa Forma e Amiga, in other TV stations worked in soap operas and Cidadão Brasileiro e Caminhos do Coração in Rede Record, Nara Paranhos Vasconcelos made the villain in the novel de Uma Rosa com Amor SBT. In 2011, she returned to TV Globo, it is in the air in the novel Fina Estampa, playing the secretary Glória Monteiro.

Carried out trials sensual, three times the cover of Playboy men's magazine in May 1993, July 2001 and in February 2008 beyond the Sexy in September 1994. It is one of the stars of Playboy DVD Making Best Ofs - Vol 7.

It Sapucaí veteran, where parades since 1991. It was featured, dancer and has even crossed the Sambadrome with the uniform board. Debuted at GRES Beija-Flor de Nilópolis, the Joãosinho Trinta, with a fancy begs, borrowed from a friend. In 1996 he was considered the muse of Carnival, as the godmother of the battery of the GRES Acadêmicos do Grande Rio, since then has been parading around the school, away only during their pregnancy.

In 2001 made the campaign "My Star Shines Against Cancer" in 2002 Bartira represented India in the traditional staging of the founding of the village of San Vicente.

== Personal life ==
In 2000 she ended a five-year courtship with businessman Ricardo Santos.

In the carnival of 2001 she began dating Armindo Junior, and in 2004 they had a daughter, Yaclara. The couple's relationship ended with the pregnancy.

In 2009 she married Alaor Paris Junior. In early February was announced to the press that the actress was pregnant for almost two months with her second child, but it was then disclosed that on February 20, 2013, the actress had suffered a miscarriage.

== Filmography ==
=== Television ===
Year	Title	Role	Notes
1993	Mulheres de Areia		Opening
1994	A Viagem		Cameo
1994	Confissões de Adolescente	Fernanda	Episode: "Chegou o Verão"
1995	Quatro por Quatro	Rita	Episode: "July 21"
1995	História de Amor	Neusa	
1996	A Vida como Ela É...	Leila	Episode: "Para Sempre Desconhecida"
1997	A Indomada	Maribel	
1997	Malhação	Naomi	Season 3; Episode: "November 12"
1997	Por Amor	Sílvia	Episode: "December 28"
1998	Corpo Dourado	Clara Faria	
1998	Malhação	Verônica Paes	Season 5
1999	Você Decide	Clara	Episode: "Mulher de Amigo"
1999	Você Decide	Rosana	Episode: "Amélia Que Era Mulher de Verdade"
2000	Você Decide	Isadora	Episode: "Pré-datado"
2001	Porto dos Milagres	Maria do Socorro (Socorrinho)	
2003	Chocolate com Pimenta	Gildete Lima (Gigi)	
2006	Cidadão Brasileiro	Maura Castanho	
2007	Caminhos do Coração	Amália Fortunato	
2008	Os Mutantes: Caminhos do Coração	Amália Fortunato	Episode: "June 3"
2010	Sonho Dourado	Gislene	
2010	Uma Rosa com Amor	Nara Paranhos de Vasconcelos	
2011	Fina Estampa	Glória Monteiro	
2014	Aprendiz Celebridades	Herself	Reality show
2015	A Ilha do Lobisomem		
2017	Tempo de Amar	Ismênia	Episodes: "December 1–6"
2019	Jezabel	Tanit	
2023	No Limite	Herself	Reality show

=== Film ===
Year	Title	Role	Notes
1998	Drama Urbano		Of Odorico Mendes
2008	A Ilha dos Escravos		Of Francisco Manso
