= Tereza Seiblitz =

Brazilian actress

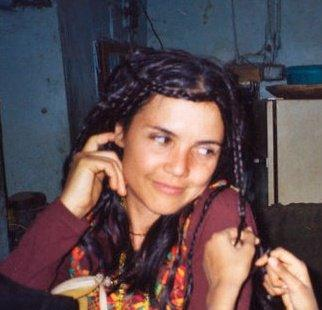
- Born: Ana Tereza Milanez de Lossio e Seiblitz; June 29, 1964 (age 61); Rio de Janeiro, Brazil
- Other name: Teresa Seiblitz
- Occupation: Actress
- Years active: 1982–2015
- Spouses: Luiz Fernando Carvalho (m. 1993; div. 1997) Kiko Horta (m. 2006; div. 2012)
- Children: 3

Ana Tereza Milanez de Lossio e Seiblitz or Tereza Seiblitz (born June 29, 1964) is a Brazilian actress.

She made an appearance in the Brazilian series, Malhação, on the Rede Globo network, in 2002. She was also the protagonist on the Brazilian telenovela Explode Coração, of Glória Perez, in 1995, opposite the Brazilian actor Edson Celulari.

Currently, she plays Lígia Salgado, a mother and desperate housewife, in the Brazilian version of Desperate Housewives, Donas de Casa Desesperadas. In original version of this series, the character is Lynette Scavo, interpreted for Felicity Huffman.

== Biography ==
Daughter of the anthropologist Zélia and of the doctor Maurício Seiblitz, Tereza graduated in Literature and Artistic Education.

Her surname Milanez is from her grandfather, José de Brito Milanez, who came from the region between Paraíba and Pernambuco, from Lossio and Seiblitz came from the family of her father, who is of Spanish origin.

== Career ==
She began in artistic life as a dancer, through her gift of dancing participated in musicals in the theater. He studied at CAL with Paulo Betti, Moacyr Góes and Tizuka Yamazaki, with whom he had the opportunity to be directed in the feature film Fica Comigo.

The actress made her debut on television in the great success Barriga de Aluguel, where she lived the antagonist Laura, then made Pedra sobre Pedra, gained notoriety in the novel Renascer as a wife of Tião Galinha, played by Osmar Prado, later in the plot, would live a romance with the priest Lívio (Jackson Costa). In 1994, Tereza starred in the special Uma Mulher Vestida de Sol and in 1995, she starred in the telenovela Explode Coração, by Glória Perez, as the gypsy Dara, alongside Edson Celulari. In 2002, he participated in Malhação. He also performed three episodes of Você Decide, a Renato Aragão Especial, and a Linha Direta.

From August 2007 to January 2008, she played the character Lígia Salgado, a housewife, in the Brazilian version of Desperate Housewives, in Rede TV, directed by Fábio Barreto.

In the theater, it stood out in diverse productions, among them O Avarento, text of Molière, in which it counted on the actor Tonico Pereira. In 2009, he made Bodas de Sangue by Garcia Lorca, directed by Amir Haddad in a short season at the Tom Jobim Theater. In 2010, he was in the play Escola de Molières.

In the movies, he starred in the film High School Musical: O Desafio.

In 2011, the actress paraded in the carnival, at the samba school Porto da Pedra, where she represented "Maroquinhas Fru-Fru", which recalled the work of the writer Maria Clara Machado. In 2015, Tereza returned to television in four episodes of the series Milagres de Jesus, where Mary lived.

Due to the care devoted to his children, he has already refused to work on television, as in the novel O Amor Está no Ar, Estrela-Guia and O Clone.

== Personal life ==
She is the mother of Manuela, born on February 13, 1998, the result of a brief relationship with actor André Gonçalves.

She was married for four years to filmmaker Luiz Fernando Carvalho, with whom she has a son named Vittório, born on June 8, 2001, as a result of a loving relapse of the couple after two years of separation.

On April 8, 2006, born Juliano, the son of José Maurício Parreira Horta, was born the musician Kiko Horta, from the group Cordão do Boitatá, his ex-husband.

== Filmography ==
=== Television ===
Year	Title	Role	Notes
1990	Barriga de Aluguel	Laura Maria Baronni	
1991	Lua Cheia de Amor	Dancer	Episode: "July 12, 1991"
1992	Pedra sobre Pedra	Jerusa Queiroz	
1993	Renascer	Joana de Pádua (Joaninha)	
1994	Caso Especial	Rosa Maranhão	Episode: "Uma Mulher Vestida de Sol"
1995	Confissões de Adolescente		Episode: "Pais Demais"
1995	Você Decide		Episode: "A Herança"
1995	Explode Coração	Dara Sbano	
1998	Hilda Furacão	Gabriela M.	
1998	Mulher	Graça	Episode: "Viciados em Amor"
1998	Renato Aragão Especial	Mara	Episode: "Didi e o Avarento"
1999	Você Decide	Clara	Episode: "Choque Mortal"
1999	O Nascimento de Jesus	Mary	Year-end special
2000	Você Decide	Maria de Lourdes	Episode: "Uma Mulher Quase Honesta"
2001	Brava Gente	Marlene	Episode: "A Coleira do Cão"
2002	Malhação	Débora Batista	Season 9
2005	Linha Direta Justiça	Arlete	Episode: "Zé Arigó"
2007	Amazônia, de Galvez a Chico Mendes	Olguinha	Phase 2
2007	Donas de Casa Desesperadas	Lígia Salgado	
2008	Casos e Acasos	Eduarda	Episódio: "O Carro, o E-mail e o Rapper"
2011	Fina Estampa	Carlota Vergara Valdéz	Episode: "July 18, 2011"
2012	Musas	Herself	Episode: "Tereza Seiblitz"
2015	Milagres de Jesus	Mary	Episode: "A Ressurreição de Lázaro"; Episode: "Barrabás"; Episode: "Os Dois Ladrões"; Episode: "A Crucificação"
2024	Justiça 2	Santana Souza de Jesus	
2024	Volta por Cima	Doralice Souza	
2025	Dança dos Famosos	Contestant	Season 22

=== Films ===
Year	Title	Role	Notes
1998	Fica Comigo		
2000	O Barato é Ser Careta		
2002	Querido Estranho	Vitória	
2010	High School Musical: O Desafio	Mother of Renata	
2012	Hotxuá		Documentary
2013	Aurélia		Short film
2013	Fora de Série	Ana	
2015	Cora Coralina - Todas as Vidas	Cora Coralina	

== Theater ==
Year	Title	Role
1982	Os 12 Trabalhos de Hércules	
1984	Léo e Bia	
1985	A Dança dos Signos	
1986	Aldeia dos Ventos	
1989	Mayã, Uma Ideia de Paz	
1993	Dona Flor and Her Two Husbands	Dona Flor
1998	Urfaust (o proto-Fausto)	Margarida
1999	Auto de Natal - O Nascimento de Jesus	Mary
2000	Eles não Usam Black-tie	Maria (girlfriend of Tião)
2000	O Avarento	
2003	Maroquinhas Fru-Fru	
2003	Ferocidade	Perverted
2004	Mambembe canta Mambembe	Laudelina
2004	A Dama do Mar (The Lady from the Sea)	Bolette
2005	Fazendo Ana Paz	Various characters
2007	Cora Coralina, Coração Encantado	Cora Coralina
2009	Bodas de Sangue	
2010	Há um Segredo Entre Nós - Sarau de Contos Iniciáticos	
2010	Escola de Molières	
2011	A Megera Domada	
2012	Amor Natural	
2013	Corpos Estranhos	
2014	Cabaré Hilst	
2015	Uma Mulher Vestida de Sol	Rosa
