= Lavínia Vlasak =

Brazilian actress and a former model (born 1976)

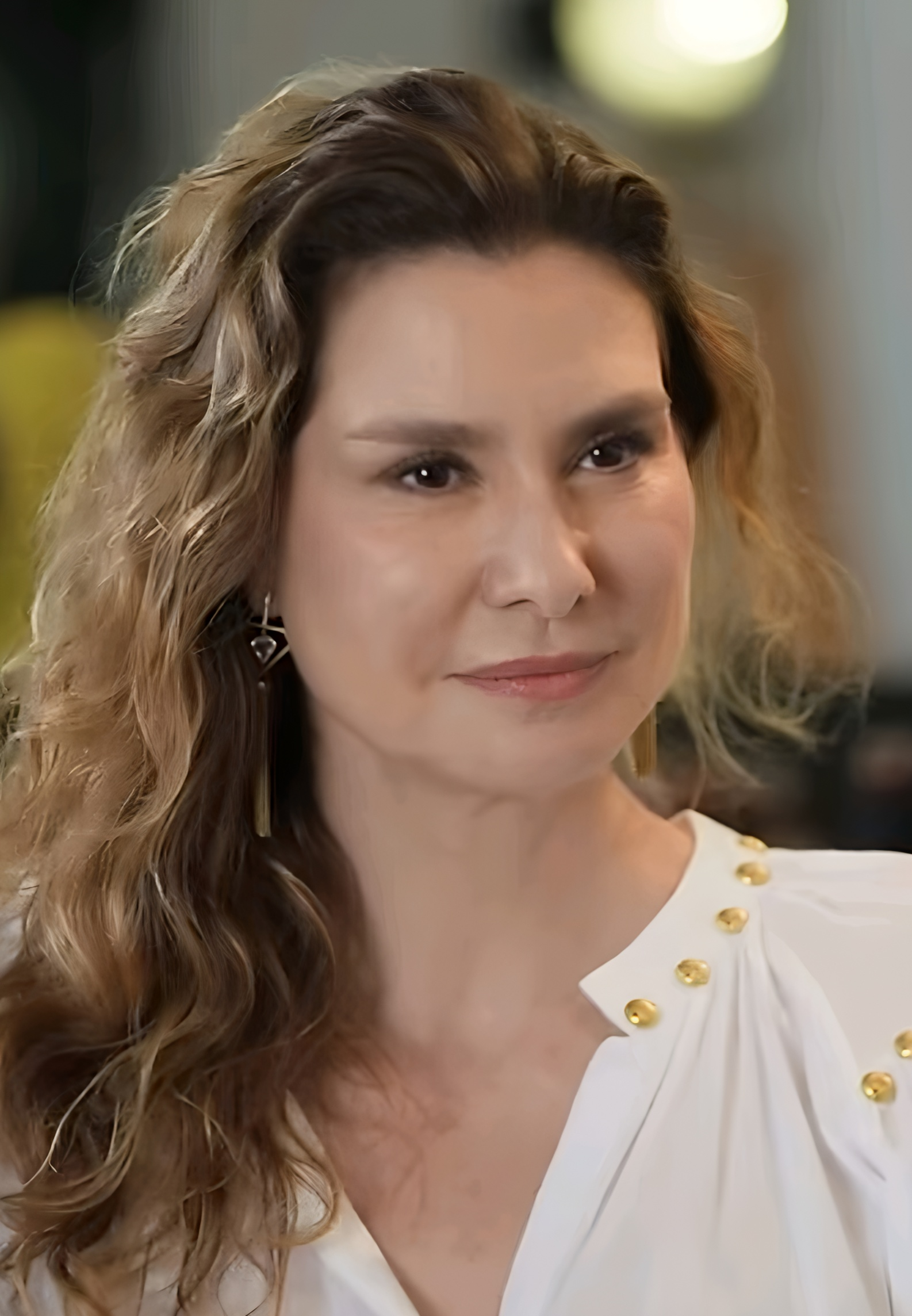
- Vlasak in 2024
- Born: Lavínia Gutmann Vlasak; 14 June 1976 (age 50); Rio de Janeiro, Brazil
- Occupation: Actress
- Years active: 1991–present
- Spouses: Jorge Pontual (m. 1992; div. 1997) Celso Colombo Neto (m. 2007)
- Children: 2

Lavínia Gutmann Vlasak (born 14 June 1976) is a Brazilian actress and former model.

== Biography ==
Vlasak was born in Rio de Janeiro, daughter of Chief Financial Officer Robert Vlasak and homemaker Eugênia Gutmann. The surname Vlasak is of Czech origin. It came from her paternal grandfather who, however, was born in Austria. In addition, Lavínia has German ancestry from both father and mother.

In 1980, she moved to the United States when her father, who worked for a multinational corporation, was transferred there. She lived outside of Brazil from 4 to 7 years of age and therefore was literate in English. After only seven years, on her return to Brazil, she learned Portuguese. When Vlasak returned, she studied at the British School in Rio de Janeiro. The school's curriculum could focus on art education, where she became interested in acting profession. Early on, listened to their teachers that would be an excellent performer.

== Career ==
She began her professional life working as a model. Her career began as pure imposition of the father, who impressed with a few pictures of her daughter, then 15, required to make a book. Lavinia has still tried to argue in vain, saying that actually wanted to do journalism, because it both had studied to be only a model but had no other alternative. After that, never stopped, and went with the money that funded this craft their courses as an actress.

At 16, she married her first boyfriend, actor Jorge Pontual, and were together for five years. She studied acting at the House of Art of the orange and also made the Actors Workshop of Rede Globo. It was during the workshop that received an invitation from director Luiz Fernando Carvalho to test for the novel O Rei do Gado.

In 1999, shone on the small screen to be honored with her first villain in the novel Força de um Desejo. In the plot, lived the perfidious Alice Ventura, daughter of the unscrupulous Higino Ventura dazzled Barbara Ventura, who dreams of becoming a noble. Nourishes an overwhelming passion by Inácio Sobral, but this only has eyes for the former courtesan Ester Delamare. In an attempt to arrest him, gets pregnant and Abelardo says that the child is her husband. Only he did not expect was to discover that Abelard, is actually his brother by his father.

After motherhood, she limited her appearances to guest appearances on shows. After five years, in 2010, she returned to Globo in the series A Vida Alheia and As Cariocas. In 2011, she made a cameo in Insensato Coração. In 2012 she participated in the episode "A Culpada de BH" of series As Brasileiras.

Lavínia returned to TV in 2015, at the invitation of director Luiz Henrique Rios, to play former model Natasha in the series Totalmente Demais.

== Personal life ==
In 1992, at the age of 16, she went to live with her first boyfriend, the actor Jorge Pontual. They had been together since their 14 years of age, and their union was against the will of their parents, who thought it too young to marry. The marital union lasted five years, and in 1997 they separated amicably.

She is married to economist Celso Colombo Neto, who has a son, Felipe, born December 27, 2008 and Estela, born February 22, 2012. Her two children were born cesarean at the Casa de Saúde São José in Humaitá, Rio de Janeiro.

== Filmography ==
=== Television ===
Year	Title	Role	Notes
1996	O Rei do Gado	Lia Mezenga	
1997	Anjo Mau	Lígia Abreu Furtado	
1998	Malhação	Érica	Season 4
1998	Você Decide	Carol	Episode: "A Primeira Vez de Carlinhos"
1999	O Belo e as Feras	Tatiana	Episode: "Filho Porque Qui-lo"
1999	Chiquinha Gonzaga	Marie de Paris	
1999	Força de um Desejo	Alice Ventura	
2000	Você Decide	Suelen	Episode: "A Poderosa"
2000	Você Decide	Clara	Episode: "O Poderoso"
2000	Laços de Família	Luiza	Episodes: "June 5–6"
2001	As Filhas da Mãe	Valentine Ventura	
2002	Brava Gente	Ana	Episode: "O Enterro da Cafetina"
2003	Mulheres Apaixonadas	Estela de Azevedo Franco	
2004	Celebridade	Tânia Nascimento	Episodes: "March 31–June 25"
2004	Casseta & Planeta, Urgente!	Herself	Episode: "June 29"
2004	A Diarista	Ludmila Versoça	Episode: "Baixa Costura"
2005	Mandrake	Alexia	Episode: "Dia dos Namorados"
2005	Prova de Amor	Clarice Luz	
2006	Vidas Opostas	Erínia Oliveira	
2010	A Vida Alheia	Mel	Episodes: "O Palácio de Inverno" / "Noblesse Oblige"
2010	As Cariocas	Julinha	Episode: "A Invejosa de Ipanema"
2010	Afinal, o Que Querem as Mulheres?	Actress	Episode: "November 25"
2011	Insensato Coração	Úrsula	Episode: "March 3–5"
2012	As Brasileiras	Isabel	Episode: "A Culpada de BH"
2014	As Canalhas	Natália	Episode: "Natália, A Recém-Separada"
2015	Totalmente Demais	Natasha Oliver	
2017	Os Trapalhões	Madame in the Restaurant	Episode: "8"
2019	Bom Sucesso	Natasha Oliver	Episodes: "October 7–November 26"

=== Film ===
Year	Title	Role
2002	Dead in the Water	Brazilian Beauty
2006	Gatão de Meia Idade	Rica
2006	Se Eu Fosse Você	Bárbara
2009	Xuxa em O Mistério de Feiurinha	Bela
2013	Se Puder... Dirija!	Ana
2019	Segue de Volta	Luciana
