= 2013 in Brazilian television =

List of years in Brazilian television
- … 2003; 2004; 2005; 2006; 2007; 2008; 2009; 2010; 2011; 2012; 2013; 2014; 2015; 2016; 2017; 2018; 2019; 2020; 2021; 2022; 2023 …
- Art; Archaeology; Architecture; Literature; Music; Philosophy; Science; +...

This is a list of Brazilian television related events from 2013.

== Events ==
- 26 March - Fernanda Keulla wins the thirteenth season of Big Brother Brasil.
- 20 June - 45-year-old coconut leaf musician Domingues da Palha wins the first season of Got Talent Brasil.
- 15 September - Actress Carol Castro and her partner Leandro Azevedo win the tenth season of Dança dos Famosos.
- 26 December - Sam Alves wins the second season of The Voice Brasil.

== Debuts ==
- 2 April - Got Talent Brasil (2013–present)
- 3 April - Historietas Assombradas (para Crianças Malcriadas) (2013–2016)
- 15 July - Chiquititas (2013–2015)

== Television shows ==
=== 1970s ===
- Vila Sésamo (1972-1977, 2007–present)
- Turma da Mônica (1976–present)

=== 1990s ===
- Malhação (1995–2020)

=== 2000s ===
- Big Brother Brasil (2002–present)
- Dança dos Famosos (2005–present)
- Peixonauta (2009–2015)

=== 2010s ===
- Meu Amigãozão (2011–2014)
- Sítio do Picapau Amarelo (2012-2016)
- The Voice Brasil (2012–2023)

== Networks and services ==
=== Launches ===
Network	Type	Launch date	Notes	Source
Arte 1	Cable television	20 March		

=== Conversions and rebrandings ===
Old network name	New network name	Type	Conversion Date	Notes	Source

=== Closures ===
Network	Type	Closure date	Notes	Source
TLN Network	Cable television	10 February		
TV Corinthians	Cable television	8 September		
MTV Brasil	Cable and satellite	30 September		

== Ending this year ==
- Carrossel (2012–2013)
- Cocoricó (1996–2013)

== See also ==
- 2013 in Brazil
- List of Brazilian films of 2013
