= 2004 in Brazilian television =

List of years in Brazilian television
- … 1994; 1995; 1996; 1997; 1998; 1999; 2000; 2001; 2002; 2003; 2004; 2005; 2006; 2007; 2008; 2009; 2010; 2011; 2012; 2013; 2014 …
- Art; Archaeology; Architecture; Literature; Music; Philosophy; Science; +...

This is a list of Brazilian television related events from 2004.

== Events ==
- 6 April - Cida dos Santos wins the fourth season of Big Brother Brasil.

== Debuts ==
- Strawberries with Sugar: the Portuguese soap opera is launched on UOL

== Television shows ==
=== 1970s ===
- Turma da Mônica (1976–present)

=== 1990s ===
- Malhação (1995–2020)
- Cocoricó (1996–2013)

=== 2000s ===
- Sítio do Picapau Amarelo (2001–2007)
- Big Brother Brasil (2002–present)
- FAMA (2002-2005)

== Networks and services ==
=== Launches ===
Network	Type	Launch date	Notes	Source
Universal TV	Cable television	1 September		
TV Ra-Tim-Bum	Cable television	1 December		

=== Conversions and rebrandings ===
Old network name	New network name	Type	Conversion Date	Notes	Source

=== Closures ===
Network	Type	Closure date	Notes	Source

== See also ==
- 2004 in Brazil
- List of Brazilian films of 2004
