= Mylla Christie =

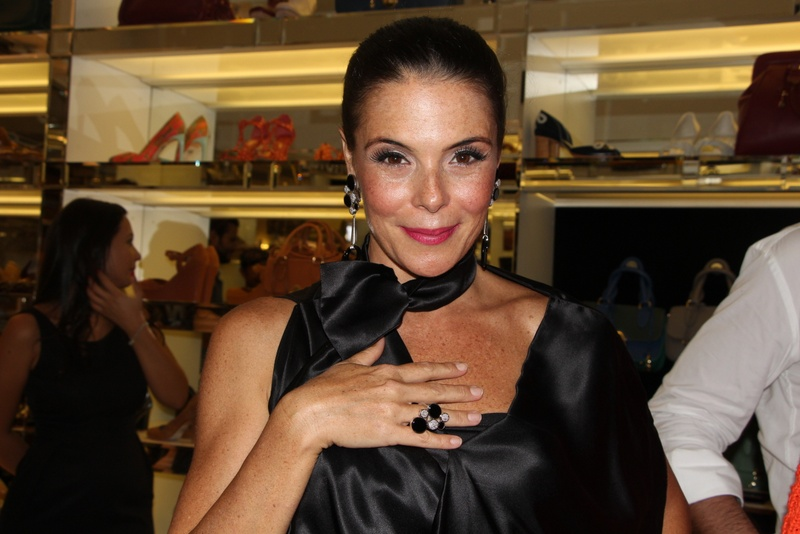
- Mylla Christie in 2020
- Born: Mylla Christie Vitta Gorga; June 10, 1971 (age 55); São Paulo, SP, Brazil
- Occupations: Actress; model; singer; television presenter; businesswoman
- Spouses: Malcolm Montgomery (m. 1993; div. 1999) Tutu Sartori (m. 2007)
- Children: 1
- Modelling information
- Height: 162 cm (5 ft 4 in)
- Hair colour: Brown
- Eye colour: Brown

Mylla Christie Vitta Sartori (born June 10, 1971, in São Paulo) is a Brazilian actress, model, singer, television presenter and businesswoman.

== Early life ==
Born to a middle-class family in São Paulo, her father Odair Gorga was a theater director and her mother Joyce Helena Vitta, a surgical instrumentator. She has a brother named Juliano Gorga.

Christie is trained in classical ballet, modern and tap dancing. At age 10, she was champion of Olympic gymnastics in São Paulo by the Clube Pinheiros. She made her television debut in 1979 at the Roberto Carlos Especial playing the Boy, while the singer played the role of Charlie Chaplin (Carlitos).

== Career ==
=== Model ===
As a model, she has appeared in Capricho magazine, and on the cover of Boa Forma, Manequim and Criativa, among others, she has made numerous publicity campaigns, such as Philco Hitachi, Pepsi, Colgate, C&A, Goodyear, Molico, Carefree, Ryder and Soap Lux. At the age of 15, she worked and lived in Japan.

She was on the cover of the men's magazines Interview in September 1995 and Playboy in November 1997.

=== Television presenter ===
She returned to Brazil and became a television presenter of the Zaap program, Rede Record, and between June 1993 and March 1994, the Clube da Criança, the extinct Rede Manchete, and as a singer recorded a disc.

She was nominated to participate in the Casa dos Artistas, at the SBT, but declined the invitation, preferring to command the program Mylla in Forma, on Rede Mulher.

=== Actress ===
As an actress, she studied acting at Myriam Muniz's acting workshop, premiered in Meu Bem, Meu Mal, playing Jéssica, a rebellious, moody, spoiled and needy girl, daughter of Ricardo Miranda (José Mayer). Worked on several novels, won a national projection in 1995, when she played Silene, the daughter of the protagonist lived by Cláudia Raia in the miniseries Engraçadinha... Seus Amores e Seus Pecados, also appeared in episodes of Você Decide, A Comédia da Vida Privada and Renato Aragão Especial.

After Quem É Você?, changed from broadcaster and went to Rede Record, starred in the novel Tiro e Queda. She was also featured in 2004, when returning to Globo, with short hair and blonde, living the controversy Eleonora, a student of medicine homosexual, in Senhora do Destino. Contracted by Record in 2007, she made Amor e Intrigas.

In cinema, she made her debut with Era uma vez..., a children's film by director Arturo Uranga, directed by Walter Hugo Khouri, made feature films with directors Emiliano Ribeiro and Del Rangel. He was the protagonist of a short film by André Ristum.

In the theater, in 2005, she staged Veneza, a piece written by Argentine playwright Jorge Acame, directed by Miguel Falabella, and in 2006 she was shown in Acorda Brasil by Antônio Ermírio de Moraes, directed by José Possi Neto.

In 2009, she participated in the filming of the feature film As Doze Estrelas, by director Luiz Alberto Pereira, in which she plays one of the protagonists. The film was released in 2011.

In 2013, after five years away from television, Christie returned in the biblical miniseries José do Egito. After the mini-series, Mylla would return only in 2017, in the novel Carinha de Anjo, in SBT. In the same year and still in the SBT, signed contract to integrate the cast of As Aventuras de Poliana.

== Personal life ==
Christie is known for her freckles. Formed in Journalism. She practiced bodybuilding, which left her with an extremely strong body, according to the actress, there was an exaggeration on the part of the media, Currently taking yoga classes and global postural reeducation (RPG).

In 1990 she dated the singer Matheus, from the band Selva. She was married from 1993 to 1999 with gynecologist Malcolm Montgomery. In 1999, she dated Fabiano Muniz Proa. She was engaged to the lawyer and actor João Lima Junior, with whom she dated from 2004 to 2006.

Christie married on December 8, 2007, with businessman Paulo Luis Sartori, known as Tutu Sartori, they dated for only seven months, but already knew each other from childhood and had studied together in high school, in 2008 the couple opened a spa in Rio de Janeiro, in 2009 they moved to a new residence in São Paulo. On July 19, 2011, Arthur was born, the couple's first child.

== Filmography ==
=== Television ===
Year	Title	Role	Notes
1989	Zap	Presenter	
1990	Meu Bem, Meu Mal	Jéssica Miranda	
1992	Deus Nos Acuda	Ully (Uli Bismark)	
1993	Clube da Criança	Presenter	
1994	A Viagem	Carlota	Episodes: "August 23–October 21"
1995	Engraçadinha... Seus Amores e Seus Pecados	Silene	
1995	A Comédia da Vida Privada	Débora (Luly)	Episode: "A Casa dos Quarenta"
1995	Você Decide	Cláudia	Episode: "Remédio Duvidoso"
1995	Malhação	Branca / Alva	Season 1; Episodes: "November 20–December 6"
1996	Quem É Você?	Ivana Cintra	
1996	Você Decide	Ana	Episode: "Bala Perdida"
1997	A Justiceira	Rosário	Episode: "Filha Única"
1997	Renato Aragão Especial	Dani	Episode: "Conto de Natal"
1999	Você Decide	Laura	Episode: "O Lobisomem"
1999	Tiro e Queda	Daniela Amarante de Castro	
2000	Mylla em Forma	Presenter	
2003	Kubanacan	Cassandra	Episodes: "July 11–14"
2004	Senhora do Destino	Eleonora Ferreira da Silva	
2007	Amor e Intrigas	Rafaela Noronha	
2013	José do Egito	Rachel	
2017	Carinha de Anjo	Drª. Alessandra	
2018–20	As Aventuras de Poliana	Verônica Pessoa Mautner	

=== Films ===
Year	Title	Role	Notes
1993	Era uma vez...		
1998	Pobres Por um Dia	Lurdes	Short film
1998	Paixão Perdida	Anna - nanny	
2001	Condenado à Liberdade	Ângela	
2001	Os Cristais Debaixo do Trono	Yasmin	
2006	O Caso Morel		
2011	As Doze Estrelas	Sandra Bis	

== Theater ==
- Equus
- 1994 - Um Passeio no Cometa .... Alpha star
- 2005 - Veneza .... Madalena
- 2006 - Acorda Brasil

== Discography ==
=== Albums ===
- 1993: Menudo - Vem Pra Mim (special guest)
- 1994: Fazendo a Festa

=== Singles ===
- Eu Só Queria (Hoy Solo Quiero) .... participation
- Meu Primeiro Amor (You're Gonna Lose That Girl)
