= Ellen Rocche =

Brazilian actress

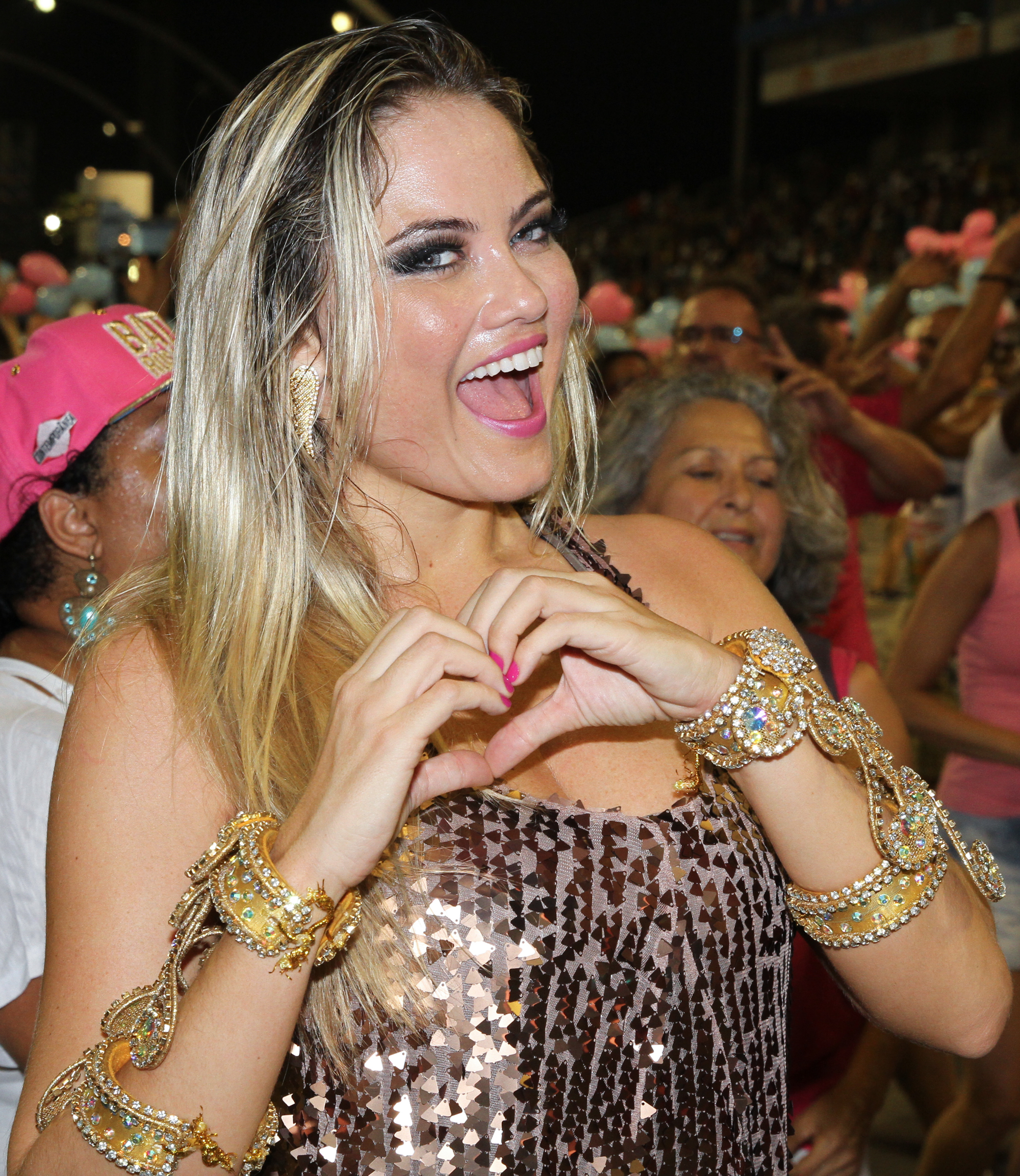
- Rocche in 2015
- Born: 19 July 1979 (age 47); São Paulo, Brazil
- Occupation: Model
- Years active: 1997–present

Ellen Rocche (born July 19, 1979) is a Brazilian model.

== Career ==
She began her career on the Sunday TV program Qual é a música? (literally, "What's the music?") with Silvio Santos on the Brazilian channel SBT. She has also acted in some chapters of the Globo program Zorra Total.

She joined the cast of a reality show based loosely on the Dutch Big Brother, dubbed Casa dos Artistas, in which famous people ("B" celebrities, in lieu of the usual anonymous participants) were locked together in a house and then gradually voted out. Rocche later refused to take part in a similar reality show by Rede Record, A Fazenda - where B-lister celebrities lived in a farm - to sign a contract with Rede Globo.

Ellen Roche was also featured on the Dream Girl Cam for the Venice Online website, and played a Brazilian version of the Lara Croft character, to promote the game Tomb Raider III in Brazil.

== Filmography ==
=== Television ===
Ano	Título	Papel
1997	Fantasia	Herself
2001	Qual É a Música?	Singer
2001	Daisy Miller	Daisy Miller
2002	Casa dos Artistas 2	Herself
2003	A Turma do Didi	Elfeia
2004	Metamorphoses	Kelly Madeira
2006	O Menino Maluquinho	Fada-Madrinha do Consumo
2007	A Turma do Didi	Lena
2007	Zorra Total	ET
2008	Beleza Pura	Gleyce
2008	Ciranda de Pedra	Teodora
2008	Dicas de Um Sedutor	Sabrina (ep: Quem Perde, Ganha!)
2008	Faça Sua História	Stefany (ep: Duas é Demais)
2008	Malhação	Juju
2008	Negócio da China	Laura
2009	A Grande Família	Bia (ep: O Rótulo e a Garrafa)
2009	Cilada	Divatriz
2009	Casseta & Planeta	Mocrellen
2009	Chico e Amigos	Das Dores
2010	Dalva e Herivelto	Estela
2010	Tempos Modernos	Cibele Porto
2010	S.O.S. Emergência	Andréa Duarte (ep: Hora de Ir para Cama)
2010	Na Forma da Lei	Denise Willians (ep: Justiça Tardia)
2010	Ti Ti Ti	Herself
2010	S.O.S. Emergência	Luísa (eps: Lá Vem a Noiva e Dos Males, o Menor)
2011	Insensato Coração	Ingrid Matos
2011	Dança dos Famosos 8	Ela mesma
2011	O Astro	Valéria dos Santos
2012	Guerra dos Sexos	Marivalda
2013	Sangue Bom	Brunettý Ramos (Mulher Mangaba)
2013	Divertics	Vários Personagens
2014	Geração Brasil	Ludmila Santini
2015	Escolinha do Professor Raimundo	Dona Capitu
2016	Haja Coração	Leonora Lammar
2017	O Outro Lado do Paraíso	Suzy
2019	Malhação: Vidas Brasileiras	Jaqueline Mota
2019	Éramos Seis	Marion
2022	Tô de Graça	Jamile
