= Fiorella Mattheis =

Brazilian actress

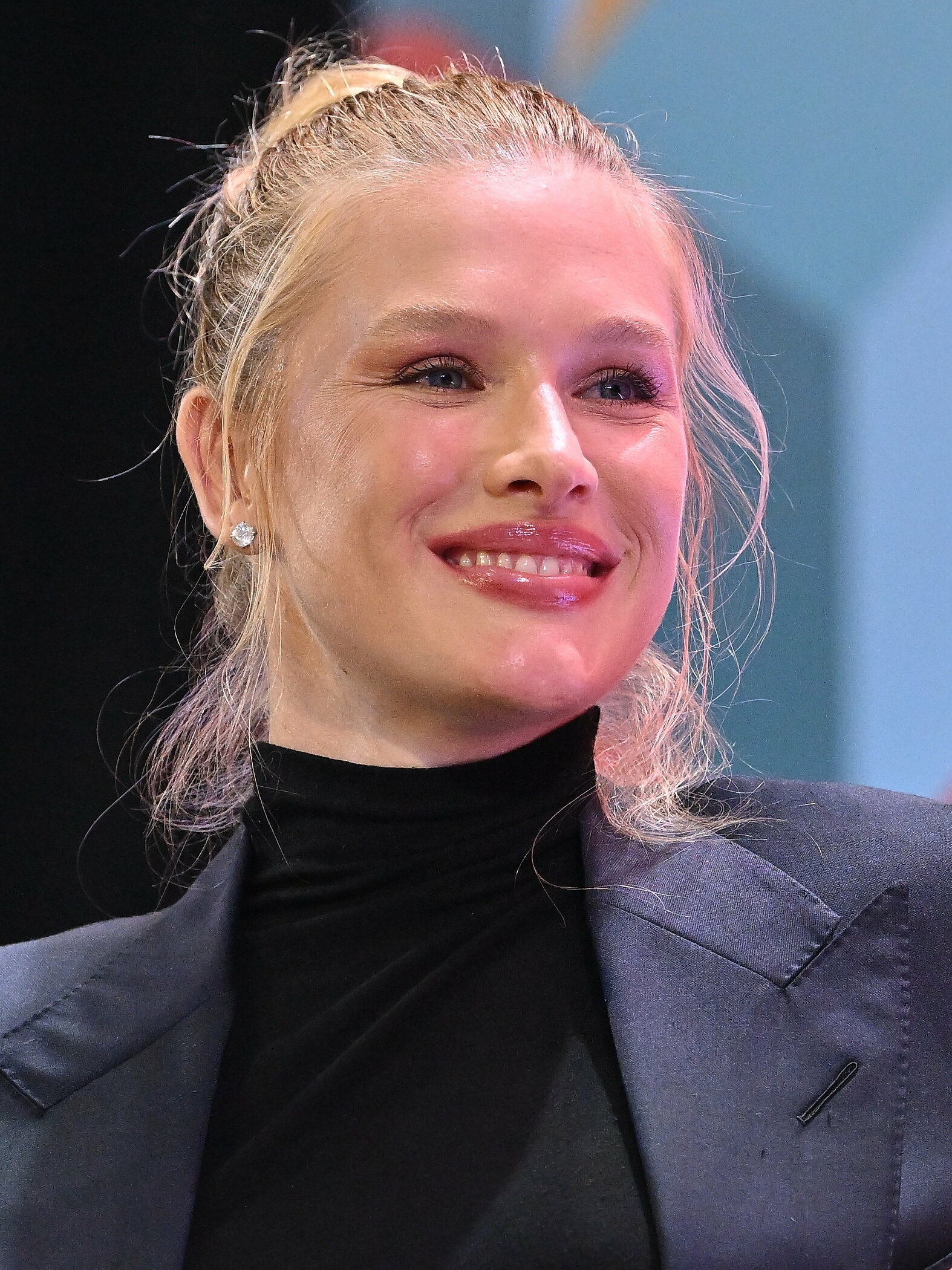
- Mattheis in 2023
- Born: Fiorella Gelli Mattheis; 10 February 1988 (age 38); Petrópolis, Rio de Janeiro, Brazil
- Occupations: Actress; entrepreneur
- Height: 1.75 m (5 ft 9 in)
- Spouses: Flávio Canto (m. 2013; div. 2014) Roberto Marinho Neto (m. 2021)
- Father: Andreas Mattheis

Fiorella Gelli Mattheis (born 10 February 1988) is a Brazilian actress, model, television presenter, entrepreneur and founder and chief executive officer of the startup Gringa.

== Biography ==
Fiorella was born in Petrópolis, Rio de Janeiro. She is of Italian and German ancestry, both her paternal and maternal family names are from Northern Italy. She is the daughter of Andreas Mattheis, a race car driver, and Sandra Gelli Mattheis. She has a degree in journalism from the Centro Universitário da Cidade do Rio de Janeiro since 2013 On July 20, 2013, she married Flávio Canto; they divorced in September 2014.

== Career ==
Mattheis began her modeling career at the age of fourteen, after being a finalist in a competition held by the agency Elite Model Management. She moved to São Paulo soon after, and it was there that her career as a model took off. From fifteen to seventeen, she lived in Japan, Hong Kong and some European countries. Her acting career started when she played Vivian in Brazilian soap-opera Malhação.

Mattheis does not consume alcoholic beverages. While she stopped eating red meat and chicken for ideological reasons two years ago, she otherwise avoids stringent dietary restrictions. Instead, she relies on an intense exercise regimen that she began as a teenager: "I run five to seven kilometers three to four times a week. Sometimes on the treadmill, sometimes outdoors." Mattheis has two personal trainers. Mattheis attributes her successful career to achieving what could not be done with beauty alone through "hard work and dedication".

In early June 2015, Mattheis was honored as the godmother of the non-governmental organization Ampara Animal in Rio de Janeiro for her activism in helping needy cats and dogs. Later that month, Mattheis had her hair treated by burning with a lit candle. This technique increases the strength and body with which hair grows, and should only be employed by qualified professionals. In July 2015, she posed in a bikini with fellow Vai Que Cola third-season actress Samantha Schmutz.

In August 2015, Mattheis posed in an advertisement for the clothing brand PG with actor and designer Paulo Gustavo. Gustavo described Mattheis as "the most beautiful woman I've ever seen."

== Filmography ==
=== Television ===
Year	Title	Character	Notes
2006	Rolé (Sport TV)	Presenter	
2007	Malhação	Vivian Pimenta	Antagonista
2008	A Turma do Didi	Ela mesma	Participação
2008	Guerra e Paz	Flávia	"Maníacos & Depressivos"
2008	Casos e Acasos	Mariana	"A Fuga Arriscada"
2008	Faça Sua História	Manuela	"A Rainha da Uva"
2009	Uma Noite no Castelo	Virgínia	Especial
2009	A Favorita	Cristal	Participação
2009	Video Show	Apresentadora	2009-2010
2010	As Cariocas	Carla Mendes	"A Invejosa de Ipanema"
2012	Fina Estampa	Loira misteriosa	Participação
2012	Louco por Elas	Frida	Participação
2013-present	Vai Que Cola	Velna (Aparecida)	Multishow
2018	Rua Augusta	Mika	

=== Film ===
Year	Title	Character	Notes
2013	Cine Holliúdy	Dream Girl	
2014	Big Hero 6	Honey Lemon	voice (dubbing)
2015	Vai Que Cola - O Filme	Velna	
2016	O Último Virgem	Débora	
