= Alexandra Marzo =

Brazilian actress and screenwriter

- Born: Alexandra de Faria Marzo; September 26, 1968 (age 57); Rio de Janeiro, Brazil
- Years active: 1986–1999
- Children: 1
- Parent(s): Cláudio Marzo; Betty Faria

Alexandra de Faria Marzo (born September 26, 1968, in Rio de Janeiro, Brazil) is a former Brazilian actress and screenwriter.

She is also the daughter of the actors Cláudio Marzo and Betty Faria. She has a daughter named Giulia.

== Career ==
=== Television ===
Year	Title	Role	Notes
1986	Hipertensão	Taís	Participation
1988	O Primo Basílio	Mariana	
1988	Fera Radical	Elizabeth Cristina Fernandes (Betty)	
1989	O Salvador da Pátria	Sílvia Toledo Blanco	
1989	Top Model	Giulia Bonicelli	
1990	Brasileiras e Brasileiros	Alma	
1993	Mulheres de Areia	Carola Sampaio	
1994	Incidente em Antares	Student	Support cast
1995	Malhação	Suzy	Season 1; Participation
1997	Mandacaru	Madalena	
1999	Suave Veneno	Lili Carabina	Participation

=== Films ===
Year	Title
1987	Jubiabá
1988	Banana Split
1996	Um Céu de Estrelas
