= Karina Perez (actress) =

Brazilian actress

- Born: September 14, 1970 (age 54); Belo Horizonte, Minas Gerais, Brazil
- Years active: 1992-1998

Karina Perez (born September 14, 1970 in Belo Horizonte, Minas Gerais, Brazil) is a former Brazilian actress.

She stood out as the jealous and uncontrolled columnist Andreia Sampaio in Mulheres de Areia, as Lilian in Tropicaliente and, in 1997, as Rose de Por Amor. She left the career of actress and currently is dedicated to the plastic arts and to its children.

== Career ==
=== Television ===
Year	Title	Role	Notes
1992	As Noivas de Copacabana	Jéssica	Episode: "June 26"
1993	Mulheres de Areia	Andreia Sampaio	
1994	Tropicaliente	Lilian	
1995	Explode Coração	Laura	
1996	Malhação	Bianca	Season 2; Participation
1997	Você Decide	Alícia	Episode: "A Vizinha"
1997	Por Amor	Rose (Rosália Trindade)	
1998	Você Decide		Episode: "Verdades e Mentiras"
