= Karina Pérez =

Karina Pérez may refer to:

- Karina Pérez (runner)
- Karina Perez (actress)
