= 2026 in television =

2026 in television may refer to

- 2026 in American television for television-related events in the United States.
- 2026 in Brazilian television for television-related events in Brazil.
- 2026 in British television for television-related events in the United Kingdom.
  - 2026 in Scottish television for television-related events in Scotland.
- 2026 in Canadian television for television-related events in Canada.
- 2026 in Croatian television for television-related events in Croatia.
- 2026 in Dutch television for television-related events in the Netherlands.
- 2026 in Irish television for television-related events in the Republic of Ireland.
- 2026 in Japanese television for television-related events in Japan.
- 2026 in Philippine television for television-related events in the Philippines.
- 2026 in Russian television for television-related events in the Russia.
- 2026 in South Korean television for television-related events in South Korea.
- 2026 in Spanish television for television-related events in Spain.
- 2026 in Tamil television for television-related events in the Tamil language.
