= 1967 in Brazilian television =

This is a list of Brazilian television related events from 1967.

== Events ==
- March 24: TV Globo forms its network, connecting its three stations in Rio de Janeiro, São Paulo and Bauru.
- May 13: TV Bandeirantes, the television network, begins broadcasting in São Paulo.
- September 14: Rede de Emissoras Independentes is created, led by TV Record in São Paulo and TV Rio in Rio de Janeiro.

== Networks and services ==
=== Launches ===
Network	Type	Launch date	Notes	Source
TV Centro América	Terrestrial	13 February		
TV Vila Rica	Terrestrial	2 March		
TV Guajará	Terrestrial	27 April		
Rede Bandeirantes	Terrestrial	13 May		
Rede Massa (TV Iguaçu)	Terrestrial	27 December		

== Births ==
- 28 March - Sérgio Loroza, actor & singer-songwriter
- 7 September - Toni Garrido, actor, singer-songwriter & TV host

== See also ==
- 1967 in Brazil
