= 2023 in Brazilian television =

This is a list of the Brazilian television related events from 2023.

== Events ==
- 2 January – TV Globo covers the funeral of footballer Pelé, who died on 29 December. The programmes cancelled are talk show Mais Você and the premiere of the film The Extraordinary Journey of the Fakir on its Sessão da Tarde movie afternoon block. O Rei do Gado, shown on Globo's afternoon repeat telenovela block Vale a Pena Ver de Novo, is originally cancelled, but eventually airs after the coverage.
- 8 January – TV Globo interrupts the film Avengers: Infinity War, shown in its movie block Campeões de Bilheteria to cover the invasion of the country's federal government buildings by Bolsonaro supporters in Brasília. The news coverage, simulcasted on GloboNews, is presented by Poliana Abritta and Erick Bang, and drops the variety show Domingão com Huck.

== Deaths ==
- 2 February - Glória Maria, journalist and the first reporter to go live and in color on Jornal Nacional.

== See also ==
- 2023 in Brazil
