= 1991 in Brazil =

Events in the year 1991 in Brazil.

== Incumbents ==
=== Federal government ===
- President: Fernando Collor de Mello
- Vice President: Itamar Franco

=== Governors ===
- Acre:
  - Édison Simão Cadaxo (until 15 March)
  - Edmundo Pinto (from 15 March)
- Alagoas:
  - Moacir Andrade (until 15 March)
  - Geraldo Bulhões (from 15 March)
- Amapa: Annibal Barcellos (from 1 January)
- Amazonas:
  - Vivaldo Barroso Frota (until 15 March)
  - Gilberto Mestrinho (from 15 March)
- Bahia:
  - Nilo Moraes Coelho (until 15 March)
  - Antônio Carlos Magalhães (from 15 March)
- Ceará:
  - Tasso Jereissati (until 15 March)
  - Ciro Gomes (from 15 March)
- Espírito Santo:
  - Max Freitas Mauro (until 15 March)
  - Albuíno Cunha de Azeredo (from 15 March)
- Federal District: Wanderley Vallim
- Goiás:
  - Henrique Santillo (until 15 March)
  - Iris Rezende (from 15 March)
- Maranhão:
  - João Alberto de Souza (until 15 March)
  - Edison Lobão (from 15 March)
- Mato Grosso:
  - Edison de Oliveira (until 15 March)
  - Jayme Campos (from 15 March)
- Mato Grosso do Sul:
  - Marcelo Miranda Soares (until 1 March)
  - Pedro Pedrossian (from 1 March)
- Minas Gerais:
  - Newton Cardoso (until 15 March)
  - Hélio Garcia (from 15 March)
- Pará:
  - Hélio Gueiros (until 15 March)
  - Jader Barbalho (from 15 March)
- Paraíba:
  - Tarcísio Burity (until 15 March)
  - Ronaldo Cunha Lima (from 15 March)
- Paraná:
  - Alvaro Dias (until 15 March)
  - Roberto Requião de Mello e Silva (from 15 March)
- Pernambuco:
  - Joaquim Francisco Cavalcanti (until 15 March)
  - Joaquim Francisco Cavalcanti (from 15 March)
- Piauí:
  - Alberto Silva (until 15 March)
  - Freitas Neto (from 15 March)
- Rio de Janeiro:
  - Moreira Franco (until 15 March)
  - Leonel Brizola (from 15 March)
- Rio Grande do Norte:
  - Geraldo José Ferreira de Melo (until 15 March)
  - José Agripino Maia (from 15 March)
- Rio Grande do Sul:
  - Sinval Sebastião Duarte Guazzelli (until 15 March)
  - Alceu de Deus Collares (from 15 March)
- Rondônia:
  - Jerônimo Garcia de Santana (until 15 March)
  - Oswaldo Piana Filho (from 15 March)
- Roraima:
  - Rubens Vilar (until 15 March)
  - Ottomar de Sousa Pinto (from 15 March)
- Santa Catarina:
  - Casildo Maldaner (until 15 March)
  - Vilson Kleinübing (from 15 March)
- São Paulo:
  - Orestes Quércia (until 15 March)
  - Luís Antônio Fleury Filho (from 15 March)
- Sergipe:
  - Antônio Carlos Valadares (until 15 March)
  - João Alves Filho (from 15 March)
- Tocantins:
  - José Wilson Siqueira Campos (until 15 March)
  - Moisés Nogueira Avelino (from 15 March)

=== Vice governors ===
- Acre: Romildo Magalhães da Silva (from 15 March)
- Alagoas: Francisco Roberto Holanda de Melo (from 15 March)
- Amapá: Ronaldo Pinheiro Borges (from 1 January)
- Amazonas: Francisco Garcia Rodrigues (from 15 March)
- Bahia: Paulo Souto (from 15 March)
- Ceará:
  - Francisco Castelo de Castro (until 15 March)
  - Lúcio Gonçalo de Alcântara (from 15 March)
- Espírito Santo:
  - Carlos Alberto Batista da Cunha (until 15 March)
  - Adelson Antônio Salvador (from 15 March)
- Goiás:
  - Joaquim Domingos Roriz (until 15 March)
  - Luís Alberto Maguito Vilela (from 15 March)
- Maranhão: José de Ribamar Fiquene (from 15 March)
- Mato Grosso: Osvaldo Roberto Sobrinho (from 15 March)
- Mato Grosso do Sul:
  - George Takimoto (until 14 March)
  - Ary Rigo (from 15 March)
- Minas Gerais:
  - Júnia Marise de Azeredo Coutinho (until 31 January)
  - Arlindo Porto Neto (from 15 March)
- Pará:
  - Hermínio Calvinho Filho (until 15 March)
  - Carlos José Oliveira Santos (from 15 March)
- Paraíba: Cícero Lucena Filho (from 15 March)
- Paraná:
  - Ary Veloso Queiroz (until 15 March)
  - Mário Pereira (from 15 March)
- Pernambuco: Carlos Roberto Guerra Fontes (from 15 March)
- Piauí:
  - Lucídio Portela Nunes (until 15 March)
  - Guilherme Cavalcante de Melo (from 15 March)
- Rio de Janeiro:
  - Francisco de Assis Amaral (until 15 March)
  - Nilo Batista (from 15 March)
- Rio Grande do Norte:
  - Garibaldi Alves (until 15 March)
  - Vivaldo Costa (from 15 March)
- Rio Grande do Sul: João Gilberto Lucas Coelho (from 15 March)
- Rondônia:
  - Orestes Muniz Filho (until 15 March)
  - Assis Canuto (from 15 March)
- Roraima: Antônio Airton Oliveira Dias (from 1 January)
- Santa Catarina: Antônio Carlos Konder Reis (from 15 March)
- São Paulo:
  - Vacant (until 15 March)
  - Aloysio Nunes (from 15 March)
- Sergipe:
  - Benedito de Figueiredo (until 15 March)
  - José Carlos Mesquita Teixeira (from 15 March)
- Tocantins:
  - Darci Martins Coelho (until 15 March)
  - Paulo Sidnei Antunes (from 15 March)

== Events ==
=== January ===
- 1 January: Amapá, a former territory, becomes Brazil's 26th state. It was the most recent state to be established in the country.
- 2 January: Creation of Pedra Azul State Park, in Espírito Santo.
- 11 January: President Fernando Collor de Mello signs Decree No. 1, also known as the Royalties Law, which regulates the payment of royalties to municipalities producing ore and electricity.
- 18 January: The second edition of the Rock in Rio music festival takes place at the Maracanã stadium.

=== March ===
- 26 March: Argentina, Brazil, Uruguay and Paraguay sign the Treaty of Asunción, establishing the South Common Market (Mercosur is its acronym in Spanish).

=== May ===
- 30 May: Florisvaldo de Oliveira, also known as "Cabo Bruno"; accused of over 50 murders, is arrested in Santo Amaro, in the state of São Paulo.
- 31 May: Chiara Lubich, founder of the Focolare Movement, visits Brazil and proposes the idea of an Economy of Communion.

=== August ===
- 1-6 August: South African anti-apartheid activist Nelson Mandela makes a six-day visit to Brazil, arriving in Rio de Janeiro.

=== September ===
- 30 September: A tornado destroys parts of Itu, a city in southeastern Brazil, killing 16 and leaving 176 injured.

=== October ===
- 12-21 October: Pope John Paul II makes a ten-day visit to Brazil.

== Births ==
=== January ===
- 8 January: Allan, footballer
- 17 January: Tiquinho Soares, footballer
- 26 January: Alex Sandro, footballer

=== March ===
- 13 March: Luan Santana, singer

=== April ===
- 4 April: Lucas Lucco, singer, songwriter and actor
- 9 April: Sancler Frantz, model and journalist

=== June ===
- 21 June: Bruno Aquino, footballer
- 26 June: Jesuíta Barbosa, actor

=== August ===
- 28 August: Humberto Carrão, actor

=== September ===
- 3 September: Maurício Destri, actor
- 9 September: Oscar, footballer
- 16 September: Marlon Teixeira, model

=== October ===
- 2 October: Roberto Firmino, footballer

=== November ===
- 6 November: Camila Finn, model

== Deaths ==
=== January ===
- 7 January: José Guilherme Merquior, diplomat and philosopher (born 1941)
- 17 January: Antônio Villas Boas, farmer who claimed alien abduction (born 1934)
- 31 January: Márcio Melo, politician (born 1906)

=== March ===
- 9 March: Ely do Amparo, footballer (born 1921)

=== July ===
- 31 July: João Chedid, Maronite bishop (born 1914)

=== December ===
- 4 December: Moysés Baumstein, holographer and artist (born 1931)

== See also ==
- 1991 in Brazilian football
- 1991 in Brazilian television
