= 1991 in Brazilian television =

This is a list of Brazilian television related events from 1991.

== Events ==
- 17 January – Plantão JN interrupts the telenovela Meu Bem, Meu Mal to announce the start of the Gulf War.
- 21 May – Plantão da Globo premieres during the intermission of the afternoon movie block Sessão da Tarde on the TV Globo. From the Jornal Nacional studio, presenter Marcos Hummel reports the death of former Indian Prime Minister Rajiv Gandhi, victim of an assassination attempt.
- 19 August – Plantão da Globo announces the attempted coup d'état in the Soviet Union against President Mikhail Gorbachev.
- November – Globosat launches four channels: GNT (at the time a news channel, now a women's channel), Top Sport (now SporTV), Multishow, and Telecine.

== Debuts ==
=== International ===
- (Australia) Johnson and Friends (TV Cultura)

== Television shows ==
=== 1970s ===
- Turma da Mônica (1976–present)

=== 1980s ===
- Xou da Xuxa (1986-1992)

== Networks and services ==
=== Launches ===
Network	Type	Launch date	Notes	Source
TVA Deportes	Cable television	Unknown		
Disney Channel Brasil	Cable television	24 June		
Turner Network Television	Cable and satellite	3 September		
Multishow; GNT	Cable and satellite	10 November		
SporTV	Cable and satellite	Unknown		
Rede Telecine	Cable and satellite	11 November		
Supercanal TVA Super	Cable television	Unknown		

=== Conversions and rebrandings ===
Old network name	New network name	Type	Conversion Date	Notes	Source
Canal +	TVA Deportes	Cable television	Unknown		

== Births ==
- 22 May - Sophia Abrahão, actress & singer

== See also ==
- 1991 in Brazil
