= Top Model (Brazilian TV series) =

Television series

- Genre: Telenovela
- Created by: Walther Negrão; Antônio Calmon
- Directed by: Roberto Talma
- Starring: Malu Mader; Taumaturgo Ferreira; Nuno Leal Maia; Cecil Thiré; Maria Zilda Bethlem; Zezé Polessa; Evandro Mesquita; Alexandra Marzo; Eva Todor; Suzy Rêgo; Alexandre Frota; Jonas Bloch; Denise Del Vecchio; Drica Moraes; Marcelo Faria; Gabriela Duarte; Jonas Torres
- Opening theme: "Eu Só Quero Ser Feliz"
- Composer: Buana 4
- Country of origin: Brazil
- Original language: Portuguese
- No. of episodes: 197

Production
- Production company: Central Globo de Produção

Original release
- Network: Rede Globo
- Release: September 18, 1989 – May 4, 1990

Top Model is a Brazilian telenovela produced and aired in the 7pm timeslot by Rede Globo, from September 18, 1989, to May 4, 1990. It had 197 chapters. It replaced Que Rei Sou Eu? and was followed by Mico Preto.

== Plot ==
Maria Eduarda "Duda" Pinheiro is a successful top model. After being hired to model Covery brand clothes, she meets the Kundera brothers, Alex and Gaspar, owners of the company.

Gaspar, a former beatnik, is over 40 but still practices surfing, lives in a beachside house and raises five children: Elvis (named after Elvis Presley), Ringo (Starr), Jane (Fonda), Olívia (Newton-John) and (John) Lennon, all from different mothers who left them with him. Anastácia "Naná" Passos, Duda's friend and mentor, loves him platonically, and rivalizes with Mariza Borges (mother of Gaspar's latest son, whom she named Alex Jr., however) over him.

Alex by contrast is a yuppie. He and their mother Morgana have a love-hate relationship and rivalizes with his brother over Morgana's attention and the company.

Alex begins to love Duda, however she falls in love with Lucas, a graffiti artist who is on the run from the São Paulo police due to his involvement in a crime there. He is also searching for his real father, and thinks it's either Alex or Gaspar.

== Cast ==
Actor	Character
Malu Mader	Maria Eduarda Pinheiro (Duda)
Taumaturgo Ferreira	Lucas Pasolini
Nuno Leal Maia	Gaspar Kundera
Cecil Thiré	Alex Kundera
Maria Zilda Bethlem	Mariza Borges Magalhães
Zezé Polessa	Anastácia Passos (Naná)
Evandro Mesquita	Adaílton Pinto de Saldanha (Saldanha / Sal)
Alexandra Marzo	Giulia Bonicelli
Eva Todor	Morgana Kundera
Luís Carlos Arutim	Silas Bonicelli
Jacqueline Laurence	Simone Bourier
Suzana Faini	Cleide Pinheiro
Jonas Bloch	Jacques Dupont
Denise Del Vecchio	Lia
Suzy Rêgo	Carla
Alexandre Frota	Raul
Cissa Guimarães	Rose
Chiquinho Brandão	Paulo Otávio (Grilo)
Drica Moraes	Maria Aparecida das Dores do Parto (Cida)
Rita Mallot	Magali
Miguel Magno	Marvin Gaye
Cinira Camargo	Milu
Vera Holtz	Irma Lamer
Felipe Donavan	Armando
Yara Cortes	dona Norma
Márcia Couto	Glória
Felipe Martins	Ivanildo (Jacaré)
Maria Gladys	Veridiana (Big Loira)
Ana Maria Magalhães	Mercedes
Children and Adolescents
Marcelo Faria	Elvis Presley Kundera
Gabriela Duarte	Olívia Kundera
Carol Machado	Jane Fonda Kundera
Rodrigo Penna	Alex Kundera Júnior (Alex Jr.)
Henrique Farias	Ringo Starr Kundera
Jonas Torres	Arthur Dupont
Adriana Esteves	Cristina (Tininha)
Flávia Alessandra	Tânia
Igor Lage	John Lennon Kundera
