= 1960 in Brazilian television =

This is a list of two Brazilian television related events from 1960.

== Events ==
- 9 July – TV Excelsior is formally inaugurated.
- 1 August – TV Bauru is officially founded, becoming the first television station in the interior of São Paulo. This is the headquarters of the first television channel outside a capital city in Latin America.

== Shows ==
- Sítio do Pica-pau Amarelo (1952–1963)

== See also ==
- 1960 in Brazil
