= 1962 in Brazilian television =

This is a list of Brazilian television related events from 1962.

== Events ==
- 3 January - The first series produced for TV in Latin America, O Vigilante Rodoviário, premieres on the now-defunct TV Tupi.
- 17 June - Brazil beat Czechoslovakia 3-1 to win the 1962 World Cup at Santiago, Chile.

== Television shows ==
- Sítio do Pica-pau Amarelo (1952–1963)

== Networks and services ==
=== Launches ===
Network	Type	Launch date	Notes	Source
TV Alterosa	Cable and satellite	Terrestrial		
RBS TV (POA)	Terrestrial	29 December		

== Births ==
- 25 July - Nelson Freitas, actor, producer & comedian

== See also ==
- 1962 in Brazil
