= 1957 in Brazilian television =

This is a list of Brazilian television related events from 1957.

== Television shows ==
- Sítio do Pica-pau Amarelo (1952–1963)

== Networks and services ==
=== Launches ===
Network	Type	Launch date	Notes	Source
TV Santos	Terrestrial	15 November		

== Births ==
- 18 February - Christiane Torloni, actress
- 20 May - Lucélia Santos, actress, director & producer
- 8 July - Françoise Forton, actress (died 2022)

== See also ==
- 1957 in Brazil
