= 2022 in Brazilian television =

This is a list of the Brazilian television related events from 2022.

== Events ==
- 27 September – On the penultimate day of the presidential candidates' televised election campaign, the campaigns of the two main candidates for the presidency, Jair Bolsonaro and Luiz Inácio Lula da Silva, are mutually accusing each other in advertisements with harsh criticism.
- 29 December – TV Globo interrupts the film Jumper, shown in its Sessão da Tarde movie block, to announce the death of footballer Pelé. The news coverage, presented by Renata Vasconcellos, then cancels the showing of O Rei do Gado, which airs on its afternoon repeat telenovela block Vale a Pena Ver de Novo and that day's episode of Mar do Sertão.

== See also ==
- 2022 in Brazil
