= List of Brazilian films of 2015 =

This is a list of Brazilian films scheduled for release in 2015.

== 2015 ==
=== January–March ===
Opening		Title	Director	Cast (subject of documentary)	Genre	Notes	Ref.
J A N U A R Y	8	Loucas pra Casar	Roberto Santucci	Ingrid Guimarães; Tatá Werneck; Suzana Pires; Márcio Garcia	Comedy	Downtown Filmes	
J A N U A R Y	15	Amor, Plástico e Barulho	Renata Pinheiro	Nash Laila; Maeve Jinkings	Drama		
J A N U A R Y	15	De Pernas pro Ar 3	Roberto Santucci	Ingrid Guimarães; Maria Paula	Comedy	Paris Filmes	
J A N U A R Y	15	Depois da Chuva	Cláudio Marques; Marília Hughes	Pedro Maia; Sophia Corral; Aicha Marques	Historical; Drama		
J A N U A R Y	22	220 Volts		Paulo Gustavo	Comedy	Downtown Filmes	
J A N U A R Y	22	Cássia	Paulo Henrique Fontenelle	Cássia Eller; Nando Reis; Oswaldo Montenegro; Zélia Duncan	Biographical; Documentary	H2O Films	
J A N U A R Y	29	Tamo Junto	Matheus Souza	Leandro Soares; Sophie Charlotte; Alice Wegmann	Comedy	Downtown Filmes	
F E B R U A R Y	26	Superpai	Pedro Amorim	Danton Mello; Dani Calabresa; Thogun Teixeira; Antonio Tabet	Comedy	Universal Pictures	
M A R C H	19	O Duelo	Marcos Jorge	Joaquim de Almeida; José Wilker; Cláudia Raia; Patrícia Pillar; Tainá Müller	Comedy-drama	Warner Bros.	
M A R C H	26	Ponte Aérea	Julia Rezende	Letícia Colin; Caio Blat	Drama	Paris Filmes	
M A R C H	?	O Outro Lado do Paraíso	André Ristum	Eduardo Moscovis; Simone Iliescu; Jonas Bloch	Drama	Europa Filmes	
M A R C H	?	Periscópio	Kiko Goifman	Jean-Claude Bernardet; João Miguel	Drama	Vitrine Filmes	

=== April–June ===
Opening		Title	Director	Cast (subject of documentary)	Genre	Notes	Ref.
A P R I L	2	Tudo Bem Quando Termina Bem	José Eduardo Belmonte	Fábio Assunção; Ingrid Guimarães; João Assunção	Comedy	Imagem Filmes	
A P R I L	16	Divã a 2		Vanessa Giácomo; Rafael Infante; Marcelo Serrado	Comedy-drama	Downtown Filmes	
A P R I L	23	De Onde Eu Te Vejo	Luiz Villaça	Denise Fraga; Domingos Montagner	Romantic comedy	Warner Bros.	
M A Y	7	Road 47	Vicente Ferraz	Daniel de Oliveira; Júlio Andrade; Francisco Gaspar; Thogun Teixeira; Sergio Rubini	Drama; Historical; War	Europa Filmes	
J U N E	11	Qualquer Gato Vira-Lata 2	Roberto Santucci	Cléo Pires; Malvino Salvador; Dudu Azevedo	Romantic comedy	Paris Filmes	
J U N E	18	Minha Mãe é uma Peça 2	André Pellenz	Paulo Gustavo; Herson Capri; Mariana Xavier; Rodrigo Pandolfo	Comedy	Downtown Filmes	
J U N E	25	Meu Passado Me Condena 2	Julia Rezende	Fábio Porchat; Miá Mello	Comedy	Paris Filmes	

=== July–September ===
Opening		Title	Director	Cast (subject of documentary)	Genre	Notes	Ref.
J U L Y	9	Carrossel		Jean Paulo Campos; Larissa Manoela; Maísa Silva	Comedy-drama	Paris Filmes	
A U G U S T	27	Linda de Morrer	Cris D'Amato	Glória Pires	Comedy	20th Century Fox	
S E P T E M B E R							

=== October–December ===
Opening		Title	Director	Cast (subject of documentary)	Genre	Notes	Ref.
O C T O B E R	1	Zoom	Pedro Morelli	Gael García Bernal; Alison Pill; Mariana Ximenes	Animation; Comedy-drama	Paris Filmes	
O C T O B E R	8	Vai que Cola	César Rodrigues	Paulo Gustavo	Comedy	H2O Films	
O C T O B E R	29	Um Namorado Para Minha Esposa			Comedy	Paris Filmes	
N O V E M B E R							
D E C E M B E R	25	Até que a Sorte nos Separe 3	Roberto Santucci	Leandro Hassum	Comedy	Downtown Filmes	
D E C E M B E R	31	A Cidade Onde Envelheço	Marília Rocha	Elizabete Francisca Santos; Francisca Manuel; Paulo Nazareth			
D E C E M B E R	31	Os Penetras 2	Andrucha Waddington	Marcelo Adnet; Eduardo Sterblitch; Mariana Ximenes	Comedy		
D E C E M B E R	31	Pequeno Dicionário Amoroso 2	Sandra Werneck; Mauro Lima	Andréa Beltrão; Daniel Dantas; Tony Ramos; Glória Pires; Miguel Arraes	Comedy	Downtown Filmes	
D E C E M B E R	31	Pequeno Segredo	David Schürmann	Júlia Lemmertz; Marcello Antony; Maria Flor; Erroll Shand; Fionnula Flanagan	Drama; Biographical		

== Unknown release dates ==
- Éden by Bruno Safadi
- Entre Abelhas by Ian SBF
- The Second Mother by Anna Muylaert
- Um Homem Só by Cláudia Jouvin

== See also ==
- 2015 in Brazil
- 2015 in Brazilian television
