= 2017 in Brazilian television =

This is a list of the Brazilian television related events from 2017.

== Events ==
- 29 March – The analog signal is shut down in the capital of São Paulo and 38 other municipalities in the metropolitan region of state.
- 3 April – The dance reality show Dancing Brasil premieres on RecordTV.
- 18 April – The second season of Power Couple Brasil premieres on RecordTV.
- 27 April – The documentary series Era Uma Vez Uma História premieres on TV Bandeirantes.
- 1 May – The program A Tarde É Sua celebrates its 11th anniversary.
- 2 May – The talk show Conversa com Bial, hosted by Pedro Bial, premieres on TV Globo with an interview with Justice Cármen Lúcia, president of the Supreme Federal Court (STF).
- 4 May – The program Casos de Família celebrates its 8th anniversary on SBT.
- 8 May – Two editions of SPTV are renamed SP1 (1st Edition) and SP2 (2nd Edition), maintaining the name SPTV during a transition process. In addition, the news programs Bom Dia São Paulo, SP1, and SP2 receive new visual identity each.
- 13 May – RedeTV! begins broadcasting another season of the Brazilian Football Championship Série B for the 4th consecutive year.
- 16 May – The result of a popular vote is announced during the news program Jornal do Almoço and the last option is chosen by 66.18% of the votes. NSC TV will be the new name of Globo's affiliate in Santa Catarina.
- 16 May – Helen Ganzarolli is removed from the recordings of the Programa Silvio Santos during the Jogo dos Pontinhos due to a foodborne infection and dismissed from work and hastily replaced by Mamma Bruschetta.

== See also ==
- 2017 in Brazil
