= Porto dos Milagres =

- Genre: Telenovela
- Created by: Aguinaldo Silva; Ricardo Linhares
- Written by: Filipe Miguez; Maria Elisa Berredo; Nelson Nadotti; Gloria Barreto
- Starring: Marcos Palmeira; Flávia Alessandra; Antônio Fagundes; Cássia Kis; Luíza Tomé; Leonardo Brício; Camila Pitanga; Arlete Salles
- Opening theme: "Caminhos do Mar" by Gal Costa
- Country of origin: Brazil
- Original language: Portuguese
- No. of episodes: 203

Production
- Running time: 60 minutes

Original release
- Network: TV Globo
- Release: 5 February – 29 September 2001

Related
- Laços de Família; O Clone

Porto dos Milagres (English: Port of Miracles) is a Brazilian telenovela that was produced and aired by TV Globo from 5 February to 29 September 2001, totaling 203 chapters.

It is written by Aguinaldo Silva and Ricardo Linhares with the collaboration of Filipe Miguez, Maria Elisa Berredo, Nelson Nadotti and Gloria Barreto. It is loosely based on two works written by Jorge Amado: Sea of Death and The Discovery of America by the Turks.

It stars Marcos Palmeira, Flávia Alessandra, Antônio Fagundes, Cássia Kis, Luíza Tomé, Leonardo Brício, Camila Pitanga and Arlete Salles.

== Plot ==
Félix Guerrero is illegally selling part of the land his father's inheritance left to him and his twin brother Bartolomeu. The police finds out, and Félix and his wife Adma are fugitives in Spain. While on the run, a gypsy prophesies that Félix will cross the sea and become king. Thinking that this prediction could only occur in Bolivia, they visit the country without any success. Then they go to Rondônia, more precisely the city of Porto Velho. Félix and Adma discover a newspaper report that Bartolomeu became the most important and powerful man in the city of Porto dos Milagres, located on the coast of Bahia. To get rid of Bartolomeu, Adma goes to Porto dos Milagres and poisons him, making Félix take the place of his brother.

Félix becomes king. However, a prostitute named Arlete, knocks on Félix's door with Bartolomeu's newborn son. Arlete is received by Adma who has been living in the town. To get rid of the legitimate heir, Adma orders Eriberto, her foreman, to put an end to Arlete and the baby. Eriberto takes a boat with Arlete and the baby at the same time that fisherman Frederico and his wife Eulália, about to give birth, are on another boat, sailing in search of a doctor. Arlete realizes the coldness of Eriberto, causing her to put the baby in a basket in the water. Eriberto kills Arlete and, when he is about to get rid of the baby, a wave stops him, capsizing the boat. The basket with the child is guided to Frederico and Eulália's boat. Eulalia's baby is born dead. Frederico, in turn, hears the baby crying in the basket in the sea and picks him up. Eulália, thinking it is her son, names the baby Gumercindo and passes away.

Years later, Gumercindo is a fisherman respected by all in his community. He meets Livia, the girlfriend of Alexandre Guerrero, Félix and Adma's son. Livia and Gumercindo fall in love, but their love is threatened by the sensual Esmeralda, who is crazy in love with Gumercindo. Gumercindo becomes Félix's main enemy when the latter is elected mayor of Porto dos Milagres. Félix does not suspect that Guma is his nephew and that he threatens his throne, as the gypsy had prophesied years before.

== Cast ==
- Marcos Palmeira as Gumercindo Vieira "Guma"
- Flávia Alessandra as Lívia Proença de Assunção
- Antônio Fagundes as Félix Guerrero and Bartolomeu Guerrero
- Cássia Kiss as Adma Guerrero
- Luíza Tomé as Rosa Palmeirão
- Leonardo Brício as Alexandre Guerrero
- Arlete Salles as Augusta Eugênia Proença de Assunção
- Nathalia Timberg as Ondina
- José de Abreu as Eriberto
- Zezé Polessa as Amapola Ferraço
- Joana Fomm as Rita
- Tonico Pereira as Francisco "Chico" Vieira
- Camila Pitanga as Esmeralda
- Marcelo Serrado as Rodolfo Augusto Proença de Assunção
- Carla Marins as Judite dos Reis
- Louise Cardoso as Maria Leontina
- Eduardo Galvão as Otacílio Ferraço
- Paloma Duarte as Dulce
- Kadu Moliterno as Dr. Rodrigo
- Fúlvio Stefanini as Osvaldo
- Flávio Galvão as Deodato
- Cláudia Alencar as Epifânia
- Mônica Carvalho as Maria do Socorro "Socorrinho"
- Júlia Lemmertz as Genésia
- Vladimir Brichta as Ezequiel
- Bárbara Borges as Luíza
- Roberto Bomtempo as Jacques
- Zezé Motta as Mãe Ricardina
- Taís Araújo as Selminha Aluada
- Miguel Thiré as Alfredo Henrique
- Sérgio Menezes as Rufino
- Daniela Faria as Haydée Caolha
- Guilherme Piva as Alfeu
- Marcélia Cartaxo as Quirina
- Cláudio Corrêa e Castro as Seu Babau
- Renata Castro Barbosa as Bela
- Camilla Farias as Ana Beatriz
- Sebastião Vasconcelos as Bispo Ferraz

=== Guest stars ===
- Glória Menezes as Dona Coló
- Lima Duarte as Senator Victório Vianna
- Ary Fontoura as Deputy Pitágoras Williams Mackienzie
- Débora Duarte as Olímpia
- Eloísa Mafalda as Celeste Marabás
- Sandra Pêra as Eunice
- Letícia Sabatella as Arlete Palmeirão
- Hugo Carvana as Delegado Gouvêia
- Reginaldo Faria as Coronel Jurandir de Freitas
- Cristiana Oliveira as Eulália
- Maurício Mattar as Frederico
- Carolina Kasting as Laura Proença
- Tuca Andrada as Leôncio
- Ilva Niño as Valdenice
- Luíza Curvo as Cecília Palmeirão
- Eunice Muñoz as Gipsy
