= 2021 in Brazilian television =

This is a list of the Brazilian television related events from 2021.

== Events ==
- 5 November – Rede Globo interrupts a commercial break during a repeat of O Clone, which is shown during its afternoon repeat telenovela block Vale a Pena Ver de Novo, to announce a plane crash that would kill singer and songwriter Marília Mendonça. The news coverage, presented by Ana Paula Araújo, then cancels a repeat of soap opera Malhação Sonhos. In addition, the network also drops the news programme Globo Repórter and a repeat of telenovela Verdades Secretas for a tribute programme to Mendonça, presented by Patrícia Poeta. TV Anhanguera Goiânia, one of Globo's affiliates in the singer's home state of Goiás, also cancels the new episode of Nos Tempos do Imperador and a repeat of Pega Pega for extended local news coverage. In addition, the network also announces the removal of the Sunday game show Zig Zag Arena for that week. RecordTV and Band also covers Mendonça's death.
- 6 November – Rede Globo (which interrupts the film Beverly Hills Cop, shown in its Saturday afternoon movie block Sessão de Sábado, and cancels a repeat of the 2015 revival of comedy Escolinha do Professor Raimundo, along with the Saturday variety show Caldeirão), Band (dropping sports events) and RecordTV (cancelling the movie Anaconda 3: Offspring, shown in its movie block Cine Maior) covers Marília Mendonça's funeral. In addition, Globo replaces the comedy programme Vai Que Cola by a special edition of variety programme Altas Horas.

== See also ==
- 2021 in Brazil
