= 2026 in Brazilian television =

This is a list of the Brazilian television related events from 2026.

== Events ==
- 7 January – The program Mais Você reaches its 6,500th edition.
- 11 January – TV Globo broadcasts the 83rd edition of the Golden Globe Awards live for the first time.
- 12 January – RedeTV! presents to the public the new set of the program A Tarde é Sua, hosted by Sonia Abrão. Afternoon program gets new studio and updated visual identity after five years.
- 20 January – The TV Globo telenovela Vale Tudo wins Best Telenovela at the Rose d'Or Latinos awards in Miami.
- 20 February – William Bonner and Sandra Annenberg debut together as hosts of Globo Repórter from TV Globo.
- 15 March – TV Globo broadcasts the 98th edition of the Oscar awards.
- 21 April – Ana Paula Renault wins the twenty-sixth season of Big Brother Brasil. She becomes the oldest contestant to win the reality show.
- 27 April – Bom Dia Brasil, the TV Globo morning news program, gains a new scenario and a new visual identity.
- 11 June – TV Globo, SporTV and SBT broadcast the first of three opening ceremonies and the opening match of the 2026 FIFA World Cup in the Azteca Stadium in Mexico City.
- 13 June – The Brazilian national football team's first match in the 2026 FIFA World Cup against Morocco is broadcast live on TV Globo.
- 19 July – The closing ceremony and the grand final between Spain and Argentina in the 2026 FIFA World Cup are broadcast live on TV Globo, Sportv, SBT and NSports.
- 28 August – Free election advertising on radio and TV starts until 1 October, three days before the first round of the 2026 general elections in Brazil, totaling 35 days of airtime.
- 29 September – TV Globo and its affiliates broadcast live debates with candidates running for governor in the 26 states and the Federal District.
- 1 October – TV Globo cancels the debate among presidential candidates fot the 2026 election. The announcement followed a ruling by the Superior Electoral Court (TSE) prohibiting an empty podium bearing Lula's name, and a decision by Supreme Court Justice Gilmar Mendes ordering the inclusion of Renan Santos in the debate. The event takes place three days before the first round of voting.
- 9 October – Free election advertising on radio and TV resumes until 23 October, two days before the second round of the 2026 general elections in Brazil.

== Deaths ==
- 10 January – Manoel Carlos, aged 92, author of Brazilian telenovelas.
- 19 March – Fernanda Santos, aged 53, TV Globo news producer.
- 21 March – Juca de Oliveira, aged 91, actor and playwright who participated in more than 30 telenovelas and miniseries.
- 23 March – Roberto Marquis, aged 93, actor, voice actor and comedian known for playing the character Teobaldo, the Juju Guard, in the comedy show A Praça É Nossa, on SBT.
- 23 March – Gerson Brenner, aged 66, actor who was successful in the 1990s telenovelas.
- 18 April – Selma Rita Severo Lins, aged 73, journalist who worked at TV Globo in the 1980s.
- 21 April – Toninho Vaz, aged 78, journalist and writer who worked as an editor for the TV programs Jornal Nacional, Fantástico and Globo Esporte.
- 31 May – Francisco Wianey Pinheiro, aged 77, former head of news at TV Globo.
- 29 June – Robson Barros, aged 57, who worked as a stage assistant on the children′s television series Xou da Xuxa.
- 6 September – Roney Facchini, aged 73, actor known for his work in productions such as Cheias de Charme, Malhação, and Rá-Tim-Bum.
- 18 October – Lua Blanco, aged 39, actress who played the character Roberta in the TV series Rebelde (2011-2012).
- 6 November – Roger Henri, aged 71, composer who was responsible for creating musical themes for TV Globo programs such as Globo Repórter and Supercine.
- 13 November – Rogério Fróes, aged 92, actor who appeared in telenovelas such as Selva de Pedra (1972) and O Bem-Amado (1973).

== See also ==
- 2026 in Brazil
