= 2016 in Brazilian television =

This is a list of Brazilian television related events from 2016.

== Events ==
- 27 March - 15-year-old Wagner Barreto wins the first season of The Voice Kids.
- 5 April - Munik Nunes wins the sixteenth season of Big Brother Brasil.

== Television shows ==
=== 1970s ===
- Vila Sésamo (1972-1977, 2007–present)
- Turma da Mônica (1976–present)

=== 1990s ===
- Malhação (1995–2020)

=== 2000s ===
- Big Brother Brasil (2002–present)
- Dança dos Famosos (2005–present)

=== 2010s ===
- The Voice Brasil (2012–2023)
- O Show da Luna (2014–present)
- Irmão do Jorel (2014–present)
- The Noite com Danilo Gentili (2014–present)
- Mundo Disney (2015–present)
- Mister Brau (2015–present)

== Ending this year ==
- Sítio do Picapau Amarelo (2012-2016)
- Historietas Assombradas (para Crianças Malcriadas) (2013–2016)
- Repórter Record Investigação (2014-2016) CANCELLED

== See also ==
- 2016 in Brazil
