= 1989 in Brazilian television =

This is a list of Brazilian television related events from 1989.

== Television shows ==
=== 1970s ===
- Turma da Mônica (1976–present)

=== 1980s ===
- Xou da Xuxa (1986-1992)
- Tieta (1989-1990)

== Networks and services ==
=== Launches ===
Network	Type	Launch date	Notes	Source
Canal +	Cable television	Unknown		
TV Abril	Cable and satellite	Unknown		

== Births ==
- 3 March - Arthur Aguiar, actor, singer-songwriter, and former swimmer
- 28 May - Rafael Almeida, actor and singer-songwriter

== See also ==
- 1989 in Brazil
