= Sessão da Tarde =

Afternoon movie block on TV Globo

- Logo since 2013
- Country of origin: Brazil
- Original language: Portuguese

Production
- Running time: Variable

Original release
- Network: TV Globo
- Release: 4 March 1974 – present

Sessão da Tarde (English: Afternoon Session) is a Brazilian television program on TV Globo that shows movies on Monday through Friday afternoons. Launching on 5 March 1974, it is one of the most enduring movie screenings.

== Opening theme ==
- 4 March 1974 – 1989: The first vignette has many pictures, and at the end the letters fly off the screen, setting up the logo. This was followed by an instrumental before the next vignette. During the 1989–1990 Christmas season, the block was temporarily replaced by Festival de Férias (Holiday Festival).
- 1990–1999: In this opening a rainbow in the sky appears under the names that make up the logo (gold color) and at the end, the rainbow and the sky are transferred to a dark background and form the logo.
- 1999–2004: The opening was updated: The rainbow was replaced by translucent colors. The clouds and the animation of the logo were redone. The first version aired from 1999 to 2000, the second version came up in 2004, with the logo looking like the Globo glass.
- 2004–4 October 2013: The source became a translucent blue, while the logo's letters revolved around a rainbow in the sky. By forming the logo, the rainbow is combined with the first word.
- 7 October 2013–Present: The opening changed identity and arrangement. The lines of varying sizes are scattered and change the color of the background and at the end the bands form the new logo.

== Movies ==
2004–2013 logo

In general, the films presented are comedy, adventure and in some cases action or drama, but this was not always the case. At one point the show presented a variety of movies, but with the rigidity of the ClassInd system, it could only show films rated L or 10. On August 31, 2016, the time restrictions imposed were no longer in force, due to a decision by the Supreme Federal Court, which in practice allowed the screening of any film. However, the broadcaster maintained the time slot as a "family session". The classic movies of Sessão da Tarde are various, such as The Blue Lagoon, Home Alone, La misma luna, Matilda, Edward Scissorhands, Police Academy, Barbie as Rapunzel, Dirty Dancing and Ghost, among many others.

On 28 November 2017, Sessão da Tarde aired its first 12-rated film, Addams Family Values, but only on certain affiliates.

On 20 September 2018, Globo affiliate RBS TV in Rio Grande do Sul aired the 14-rated film O Tempo e o Vento in Sessão da Tarde's time slot; the rest of the country saw the 10-rated Playing House.

== Ratings ==
Currently, across Brazil the movie session averages 15 points and 47% interest, and is the leader in its exhibition schedule. The audience demographic is mostly people between 25 and 49 years (37%), class C (53%) versus 24% of class A and B, and 23% of classes D and E. Most are women over 18, who make up 49% of the audience.
