= 1992 in Brazilian television =

This is a list of Brazilian television related events from 1992.

== Events ==
- April 8 – The first interactive program on Brazilian television Você Decide premieres on TV Globo.
- September 29 – Globo, SBT, Bandeirantes, Manchete and Record cover the impeachment of President of the Republic Fernando Collor.
- December 31 – The program Xou da Xuxa comes to an end. It is considered to be the most successful children's show in Brazilian television history and would consecrate Xuxa Meneghel.

== Television shows ==
=== 1970s ===
- Turma da Mônica (1976–present)

== Ending this year ==
- December 31 - Xou da Xuxa (1986-1992)

== Births ==
- 6 January - Rodrigo Simas, actor
- 19 January - Agatha Moreira, actress & model

== See also ==
- 1992 in Brazil
