= 2015 in Brazilian television =

This is a list of Brazilian television related events from 2015.

== Events ==
- 7 April - Cézar Lima wins the fifteenth season of Big Brother Brasil.
- 6 December - Actress Viviane Araújo and her partner Marcelo Grangeiro win the twelfth season of Dança dos Famosos.
- 25 December - Renato Vianna wins the fourth season of The Voice Brasil.

== Television shows ==
=== 1970s ===
- Vila Sésamo (1972-1977, 2007–present)
- Turma da Mônica (1976–present)

=== 1990s ===
- Malhação (1995–2020)

=== 2000s ===
- Big Brother Brasil (2002–present)
- Dança dos Famosos (2005–present)
- Peixonauta (2009–2015)

=== 2010s ===
- Sítio do Picapau Amarelo (2012-2016)
- The Voice Brasil (2012–present)
- Historietas Assombradas (para Crianças Malcriadas) (2013–2016)
- O Show da Luna (2014–present)
- Irmão do Jorel (2014–present)
- The Noite com Danilo Gentili (2014–present)
- Mundo Disney (2015–present)
- Mister Brau (2015–present)

== Networks and services ==
=== Launches ===
Network	Type	Launch date	Notes	Source
TNT Series	Cable television	24 April		
Esporte Interativo	Cable television	25 July		

=== Conversions and rebrandings ===
Old network name	New network name	Type	Conversion Date	Notes	Source

=== Closures ===
Network	Type	Closure date	Notes	Source
BBC HD Brasil	Cable television	28 May		
ForMan	Cable television	1 October		
Private	Cable television	1 October		

== Ending this year ==
- Programa da Tarde (2012-2015), Rede Record
- Agora é Tarde (2011-2015), Rede Bandeirantes
- Ichiban (2014-2015), PlayTV
- Go!Game (2011-2015), PlayTV
- Notícias da Manhã (2014-2015), SBT
- Muito Show (2013-2015), RedeTV
- Vitória (2014-2015), Rede Record
- TV Globinho (2000-2015), Rede Globo
- Interferência Stay Heavy (2012-2015), PlayTV
- Provocações (2000-2015), TV Cultura SP
- Chiquititas (2013-2015), SBT

== Deaths ==
Date	Name	Age	Cinematic Credibility
13 November	Luís Carlos Miele	77	Brazilian producer, actor, TV host & director

== See also ==
- 2015 in Brazil
- List of Brazilian films of 2015
