= 1996 in Brazilian television =

This is a list of Brazilian television related events from 1996.

== Events ==
- 29 March: Anchorman Cid Moreira goes on air for the last time in Jornal Nacional.
- 1 April: Presenter William Bonner debuts in Jornal Nacional, alongside Lillian Witte Fibe.

== Debuts ==
- 1 April - Cocoricó (1996–2013)

== Television shows ==
=== 1970s ===
- Turma da Mônica (1976–present)

=== 1990s ===
- Castelo Rá-Tim-Bum (1994-1997)
- Malhação (1995–2020)

== Networks and services ==
=== Launches ===
Network	Type	Launch date	Notes	Source
UniTV	Cable and satellite	Unknown		
Discovery World	Cable television	16 March		
TV Senado	Cable and satellite	5 February		
TV Escola	Cable and satellite	4 March		
USA Network	Cable television	10 May		
Bravo Brasil	Cable television	1 June		
Globo News	Cable and satellite	15 October		
Rede 21	Cable and satellite	21 October		
Discovery Kids	Cable television	1 November		
Canal Rural	Cable television	11 November		
SmarTV Hot	Cable television	10 December		
Nickelodeon	Cable television	20 December		

== Deaths ==
- 6 November - Madalena Nicol, 76, actress

== See also ==
- 1996 in Brazil
