= 2014 in Brazilian television =

This is a list of Brazilian television related events from 2014.

== Events ==
- 1 April - Vanessa Mesquita wins the fourteenth season of Big Brother Brasil.
- 30 November - Actor Marcello Melo Jr. and his partner Raquel Guarini win the eleventh season of Dança dos Famosos.
- 25 December - Danilo Reis & Rafael win the third season of The Voice Brasil.

== Debuts ==
- 10 March The Noite com Danilo Gentili (2014–present)
- 16 August - O Show da Luna (2014–present)
- 22 September - Irmão do Jorel (2014–present)

== Television shows ==
=== 1970s ===
- Vila Sésamo (1972-1977, 2007–present)
- Turma da Mônica (1976–present)

=== 1990s ===
- Malhação (1995–2020)

=== 2000s ===
- Big Brother Brasil (2002–present)
- Dança dos Famosos (2005–present)
- Peixonauta (2009–2015)

=== 2010s ===
- Meu Amigãozão (2011–2014)
- Sítio do Picapau Amarelo (2012-2016)
- The Voice Brasil (2012–2023)
- Historietas Assombradas (para Crianças Malcriadas) (2013–2016)
- Chiquititas (2013-2015)

== Networks and services ==
=== Launches ===
Network	Type	Launch date	Notes	Source
Esporte Interativo	Cable television	5 January		
Fox Sports 2	Cable television	24 January		
History 2	Cable television	1 October		
Nat Geo HD/Fox HD	Cable television	3 November		
Paramount Channel	Cable and satellite	14 November		

=== Closures ===
Network	Type	Closure date	Notes	Source
Bem Simples	Cable television	1 June		
Sony Spin	Cable television	1 July		
Mix TV	Cable and satellite	November 3		
Nat Geo/Fox HD	Cable television	3 November		
SuperMix	Cable television	3 November		
VH1	Cable and satellite	12 December		

== See also ==
- 2014 in Brazil
- List of Brazilian films of 2014
