= 1998 in Brazilian television =

This is a list of Brazilian television related events from 1998.

== Debuts ==
=== International ===
- 2 February - (United Kingdom) / (Canada) Rupert (TV Cultura)
- (United States) / (Canada) Salty's Lighthouse (TV Cultura)

== Television shows ==
=== 1970s ===
- Turma da Mônica (1976–present)

=== 1990s ===
- Malhação (1995–2020)
- Cocoricó (1996–2013)
- Chiquititas (1997–2001)

== Networks and services ==
=== Launches ===
Network	Type	Launch date	Notes	Source
TV Câmara	Cable and satellite	20 January		
TV NBR	Cable and satellite	18 April		
Canal Brasil	Cable and satellite	18 September		
The Weather Channel	Cable television	Unknown		

=== Conversions and rebrandings ===
Old network name	New network name	Type	Conversion Date	Notes	Source
Spelling Satellite Networks	TeleUno	Cable television	14 September		

== Births ==
- 13 January - Isabela Souza, actress
- 11 March - Valentina Herszage, actress and model
- 20 May - Alanis Guillen, actress and model
- 16 December - Clara Moneke, actress and model

== See also ==
- 1998 in Brazil
