= 1993 in Brazilian television =

This is a list of Brazilian television related events from 1993.

== Television shows ==
=== 1970s ===
- Turma da Mônica (1976–present)

== Networks and services ==
=== Launches ===
Network	Type	Launch date	Notes	Source
Cartoon Network	Cable and satellite	30 April		
I. Sat	Cable television	5 April		
TeleUno	Cable television	1 August		

=== Closures ===
Network	Type	Closure date	Notes	Source
TV Jovem Pan	Cable and satellite	Unknown		

== Births ==
- 1993, 26 January - Felipe Simas, actor.
- 1993, 15 March - Brenno Leone, actor.
- 1993, 24 March - Miguel Roncato, actor.
- 1993, 28 March - Juliana Paiva, actress & model.

== See also ==
- 1993 in Brazil
