= 2011 in Brazilian television =

This is a list of Brazilian television related events from 2011.

== Events ==
- 29 March – Maria Melillo wins the eleventh season of Big Brother Brasil.
- 14 July – Henrique Lemes wins the sixth season of Ídolos.
- 4 September – 18-year-old actor Miguel Roncato and his partner Ana Flavia Simões win the eighth season of Dança dos Famosos.

== Television shows ==
=== 1970s ===
- Vila Sésamo (1972–1977, 2007–present)
- Turma da Mônica (1976–present)

=== 1990s ===
- Malhação (1995–2020)
- Cocoricó (1996–2013)

=== 2000s ===
- Big Brother Brasil (2002–present)
- Dança dos Famosos (2005–present)
- Ídolos (2006–2012)
- Peixonauta (2009–2015)

=== 2010s ===
- Meu Amigãozão (2011–2014)

== Networks and services ==
=== Launches ===
Network	Type	Launch date	Notes	Source
Prime Box Brazil	Cable and satellite	January 21		
Bem Simples	Cable television	1 March		
TV Corinthians	Cable television	1 March		
Sony Spin	Cable television	1 May		
TV Universal	Cable and satellite	1 July		
Canal Off	Cable television	8 December		

== See also ==
- 2010 in Brazil
- List of Brazilian films of 2010
