= 2006 in Brazilian television =

This is a list of Brazilian television related events from 2006.

== Events ==
- 26 March - Malhação actress Juliana Didone and her partner Leandro Azevedo win the second season of Dança dos Famosos.
- 28 March - Mara Viana wins the sixth season of Big Brother Brasil.
- 5 April - The Brazilian version of Pop Idol debuts on SBT.
- 27 July - Leandro Lopes wins the first season of Ídolos.
- 6 August - Former Olympic athlete Robson Caetano and his partner Ivonete Liberatto win the third season of Dança dos Famosos.

== Debuts ==
- 5 April - Ídolos (2006-2012)

== Television shows ==
=== 1970s ===
- Turma da Mônica (1976–present)

=== 1990s ===
- Malhação (1995–2020)
- Cocoricó (1996–2013)

=== 2000s ===
- Sítio do Picapau Amarelo (2001–2007)
- Big Brother Brasil (2002–present)
- Dança dos Famosos (2005–present)
- Ídolos (2006-2012)

== Networks and services ==
=== Launches ===
| Network | Type | Launch date | Notes | Source |
|---|---|---|---|---|
| PlayTV | Cable and satellite | 5 June | | |
| Woohoo | Cable and satellite | Unknown | | |

== See also ==
- 2006 in Brazil
- List of Brazilian films of 2006
