= 2010 in Brazilian television =

The following is a list of events related to Brazilian television from 2010.

== Events ==
- 30 March - Marcelo Dourado wins the tenth season of Big Brother Brasil.
- 25 July - Actress Fernanda Souza and her partner Alexandre Porcel win the seventh season of Dança dos Famosos.
- 23 September - Israel Lucero wins the fifth season of Ídolos.

== Debuts ==
- August 9 - Meu Amigãozão (2010–present)

== Television shows ==
=== 1970s ===
- Vila Sésamo (1972-1977, 2007–present)
- Turma da Mônica (1976–present)

=== 1990s ===
- Malhação (1995–2020)
- Cocoricó (1996–2013)

=== 2000s ===
- Big Brother Brasil (2002–present)
- Dança dos Famosos (2005–present)
- Ídolos (2006-2012)
- Peixonauta (2009–2015)

== Networks and services ==
=== Launches ===
Network	Type	Launch date	Notes	Source			
Studio Universal Brazil	Cable and satellite	1 February			TV Brasil Internacional	Cable and television	24 May
TLN Network	Cable television	9 August					
TV dos Trabalhadores	Cable and satellite	23 August					
Sextreme	Cable television	27 August					
Telecine Fun	Cable and satellite	Unknown					

=== Conversions and rebrandings ===
Old network name	New network name	Type	Conversion Date	Notes	Source
MTV Hits	VH1 MegaHits	Cable television	1 February		

== See also ==
- 2010 in Brazil
- List of Brazilian films of 2010
