= 2008 in Brazilian television =

This is a list of Brazilian television related events from 2008.

== Events ==
- 25 March - Rafinha Ribeiro wins the eighth season of Big Brother Brasil.
- 11 May - Actress Christiane Torloni and her partner Álvaro Reis win the fifth season of Dança dos Famosos.
- 17 December - Rafael Barreto wins the third season of Ídolos. This was the first season to be broadcast on Rede Record.

== Television shows ==
=== 1970s ===
- Vila Sésamo (1972-1977, 2007–present)
- Turma da Mônica (1976–present)

=== 1990s ===
- Malhação (1995–2020)
- Cocoricó (1996–2013)

=== 2000s ===
- Big Brother Brasil (2002–present)
- Dança dos Famosos (2005–present)
- Ídolos (2006-2012)

== Networks and services ==
=== Launches ===
Network	Type	Launch date	Notes	Source
Nick Jr.	Cable television	2 April		
TV Camara Jacarei	Cable and satellite	28 April		
Japao Brasil Network Television	Cable television	18 June		
Megapix	Cable and satellite	8 July		
FizTV	Cable television	29 July		
Nat Geo HD/Fox HD	Cable television	1 December		
Tooncast	Cable and satellite	1 December		

== See also ==
- 2008 in Brazil
- List of Brazilian films of 2008
