= 1999 in Brazilian television =

This is a list of Brazilian television related events from 1999.

== Events ==
- 10 May – Rede Manchete shut down.
- 15 November – RedeTV! launched.

== Television shows ==
=== 1970s ===
- Turma da Mônica (1976–present)

=== 1990s ===
- Malhação (1995–2020)
- Cocoricó (1996–2013)
- Chiquititas (1997–2001)

== Networks and services ==
=== Launches ===
Network	Type	Launch date	Notes	Source
AXN	Cable television	1 August		
Bravo Brasil	Cable television	1 August		
Rede Internacional de Televisão	Cable and satellite	August		
RedeTV!	Cable television	15 November		
Futura	Cable and satellite	11 December		
Climatempo	Cable television	Unknown		

=== Closures ===
Network	Type	Closure date	Notes	Source
Rede Manchete	Cable and satellite	10 May		

== See also ==
- 1999 in Brazil
