= 1995 in Brazilian television =

This is a list of Brazilian television related events from 1995.

== Events ==
- 2 October – Journalist Roberto Marinho opens Estúdios Globo, formerly Projac, which is the largest studio complex for TV production in Brazil.

== Debuts ==
- 24 April - Malhação (1995–2020)

== Television shows ==
=== 1970s ===
- Turma da Mônica (1976–present)

=== 1990s ===
- Castelo Rá-Tim-Bum (1994-1997)

== Networks and services ==
=== Launches ===
Network	Type	Launch date	Notes	Source
Agro Canal	Cable television	Unknown		
Venus	Cable television	Unknown		
Redevida	Satellite television	1 May		
Shoptime	Cable and satellite	6 November		
CMT	Cable television	1 July		

=== Conversions and rebrandings ===
Old network name	New network name	Type	Conversion Date	Notes	Source
TVA Deportes	ESPN	Cable television	17 June		

== Births ==
- 5 January - Whindersson Nunes, actor & youtuber
- 4 August - Bruna Marquezine, actress & model

== See also ==
- 1995 in Brazil
