= 1997 in Brazilian television =

This is a list of Brazilian television related events from 1997.

== Debuts ==
- 28 July - Chiquititas (1997–2001)

== Television shows ==
=== 1970s ===
- Turma da Mônica (1976–present)

=== 1990s ===
- Malhação (1995–present)
- Cocoricó (1996–present)
- Chiquititas (1997–2001)

== Networks and services ==
=== Launches ===
Network	Type	Launch date	Notes	Source
TV COM	Cable and satellite	6 January		
TV Alvorada	Cable and satellite	10 January		
A&E	Cable television	17 March		
Cinemax	Cable television	October 1		
Premiere Exportes	Cable and satellite	Unknown		
Telecine Action	Cable and satellite	Unknown		
Telecine Touch	Cable and satellite	Unknown		
Telecine Pipoca	Cable and satellite	Unknown		
Telecine Cult	Cable and satellite	Unknown		
Animal Planet	Cable and satellite	Unknown		

=== Conversions and rebrandings ===
Old network name	New network name	Type	Conversion Date	Notes	Source
SmarTV Hot	Sexy Hot	Cable television	Unknown		

== Ending this year ==
- Castelo Rá-Tim-Bum (1994-1997)

== See also ==
- 1997 in Brazil
