= 2012 in Brazilian television =

This is a list of Brazilian television related events from 2012.

== Events ==
- 29 March - Fael Cordeiro wins the twelfth season of Big Brother Brasil.
- 16 September - Actor Rodrigo Simas and his partner Raquel Guarini win the ninth season of Dança dos Famosos.
- 13 December - Everton Silva wins the sixth and final season of Ídolos.
- 16 December - Ellen Oléria wins the first season of The Voice Brasil.

== Debuts ==
- 7 January - Sítio do Picapau Amarelo (2012-2016)
- 21 May - Carrossel (2012–2013)
- 23 September - The Voice Brasil (2012–present)

== Television shows ==
=== 1970s ===
- Vila Sésamo (1972-1977, 2007–present)
- Turma da Mônica (1976–present)

=== 1990s ===
- Malhação (1995–2020)
- Cocoricó (1996–2013)

=== 2000s ===
- Big Brother Brasil (2002–present)
- Dança dos Famosos (2005–present)
- Peixonauta (2009–2015)

=== 2010s ===
- Meu Amigãozão (2011–2014)

== Networks and services ==
=== Launches ===
Network	Type	Launch date	Notes	Source
Comedy Central	Cable television	1 February		
Fox Sports 1	Cable television	5 February		
BBC HD	Cable television	28 May		
Gloob	Cable and satellite	15 June		
Fish TV	Cable television	29 June		
TV La Verdad	Cable and satellite	July		
Investigacao Discovery	Cable television	9 July		
Bis	Cable television	27 August		
SuperMix	Cable television	30 August		
Music Box Brazil	Cable and satellite	Unknown		
Telecine Play	Cable and satellite	Unknown		
Curta!	Cable television	1 November		

== Ending this year ==
- Ídolos (2006-2012)

== See also ==
- 2012 in Brazil
- List of Brazilian films of 2012
