= 2007 in Brazilian television =

This is a list of Brazilian television related events from 2007.

== Events ==
- 3 April - Diego Gasques wins the seventh season of Big Brother Brasil.
- 17 June - Actor and model Rodrigo Hilbert and his partner Priscila Amaral win the fourth season of Dança dos Famosos.
- 16 August - Thaeme Mariôto wins the second season of Ídolos, becoming the show's only female winner. This was the last season to be broadcast on SBT.

== Debuts ==
- 29 October - Vila Sésamo (1972-1977, 2007–present)

== Television shows ==
=== 1970s ===
- Turma da Mônica (1976–present)

=== 1990s ===
- Malhação (1995–2020)
- Cocoricó (1996–2013)

=== 2000s ===
- Big Brother Brasil (2002–present)
- Dança dos Famosos (2005–present)
- Ídolos (2006-2012)

== Networks and services ==
=== Launches ===
Network	Type	Launch date	Notes	Source
Rede Brasil de Televisão	Cable and satellite	7 April		
RIT Noticias	Cable television	13 August		
Nossa TV	Cable and satellite	14 September		
Record News	Cable and satellite	27 September		
Ideal TV	Cable and satellite	1 October		
Playboy TV	Cable television	July		
Private	Cable television	July		
Space	Cable and satellite	Unknown		

=== Closures ===
Network	Type	Closure date	Notes	Source
TV Brasil	Cable and satellite	2 December		

== Ending this year ==
- Sítio do Picapau Amarelo (2001–2007)

== See also ==
- 2007 in Brazil
- List of Brazilian films of 2007
