= Television in Brazil =

Television in Brazil has grown significantly since the first broadcasts on 18 September 1950, with the (now defunct) Rede Tupi by Assis Chateaubriand, becoming one of the largest and most productive commercial television systems in the world. Its biggest network, TV Globo (founded by Roberto Marinho on 26 April 1965), is the largest commercial network in South America, and is one of the major television exporter globally, particularly of telenovelas, having become popular in many countries. There are more than 90 free-to-air television networks (national and regional), as well as satellite channels broadcasting throughout the country.

== History ==
=== Early years ===
In Brazil around the same time, the concessions for the first television broadcast network were decreed and distributed by President Eurico Gaspar Dutra's administration, and a cornerstone was placed for the very first transmitter in Brazil for the first commercial network, Rede Tupi. It was initially located in the municipality of Morro do Pão de Açúcar, in the city of Rio de Janeiro. By 1949, a group of technicians and engineers arrived in Brazil and visited the planned location for the broadcast tower for the first time only to find that due to the topography in Rio, the planned broadcast tower site wouldn't be the ideal place for its installation. As media mogul Assis Chateaubriand was interested in the opening of the first broadcast television network in Brazil and Latin America and already knew that the US was crucial in sponsoring the first TV broadcast in Cuba on Christmas Day of 1950, he decided to transfer to São Paulo for the inaugural broadcast, and the government gave the concession of channel 3, given by Radio Difusora in order to start Rede Tupi's operations.

Then, Chateaubriand ordered the broadcasting equipment necessary, for the station had already been built, just in time for this installation. In July 1950, the equipment arrived by ship in Port Santos and was accompanied to the capital by one of the many artists of the Emissoras Associadas group in São Paulo via motorcade. The motorcade was a hit, and crowds gathered to see the equipment being driven to the new station, a preview of what the new station would offer.

Finally, on the 18th of September, 1950, network television in Brazil made its official debut in São Paulo with TV Tupi on channel 3, in an historical ceremony that was considered simplistic for the occasion in one question away. And Chateaubriand, owner of the new channel, had transmitters built across the city so that the people of the so-called Paulista would know what television is, as many people still didn't even know about TV at all. A number of TV sets were given to restaurants, bars and other places so that those who have not yet brought TVs would see the new medium themselves. It was the first Lusophone or Portuguese-speaking country to introduce television, even before the home country of Portugal with RTP (1955). It was also the fifth nation in the world to have a television station with daily broadcasts, behind the United States, the United Kingdom, France, and Mexico. The first television show on Tupi was first broadcast on the eve of September, and is considered the first Brazilian television program, TV na Taba, in an allusion to the indigenous people, who were already inhabited the Brazilian lands in the pre-Cabral era.

The network's symbol, a small Indian boy with an antenna on his head, appeared with the opening message: "Good evening. You are in the open TV station in Brazil," considering to be the first line of Brazilian television, starring the young actress Sonia Maria Dorce, then aged 6.

Another characteristic of television productions of this early period was live impromptu, as there was no videotape. The high costs of TV sets, which were imported, restricted the access of the media to the urban elites of major cities. Technical resources were primary, offering broadcasters just enough to keep the stations on the air. It was during that period that TV news and telenovelas were established.

The advent of videotape around 1960 brought imported programs to Brazilian television.

=== Expansion, Rede Globo's beginnings ===
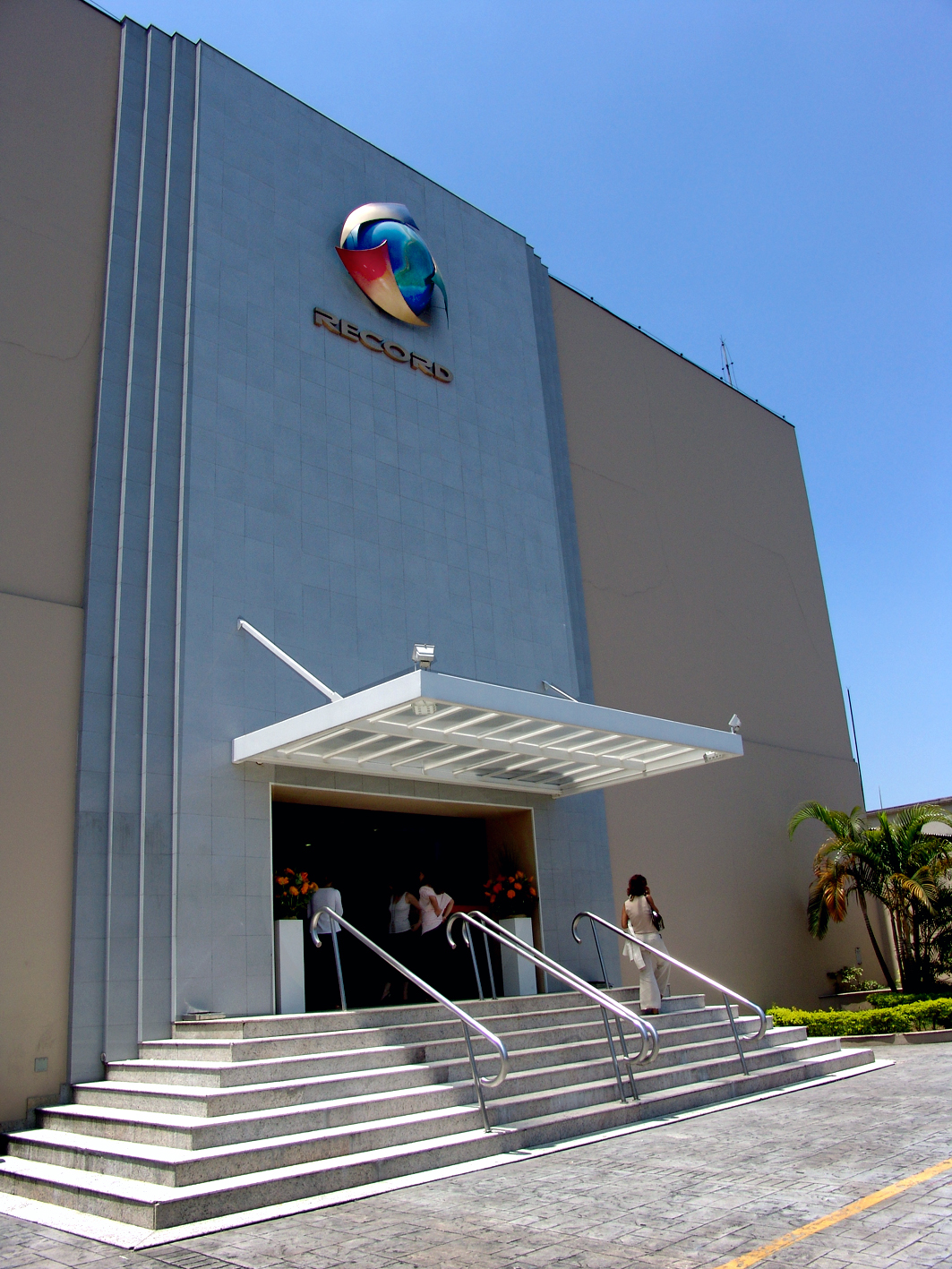
Theatre Record, the main headquarters of RecordTV in São Paulo

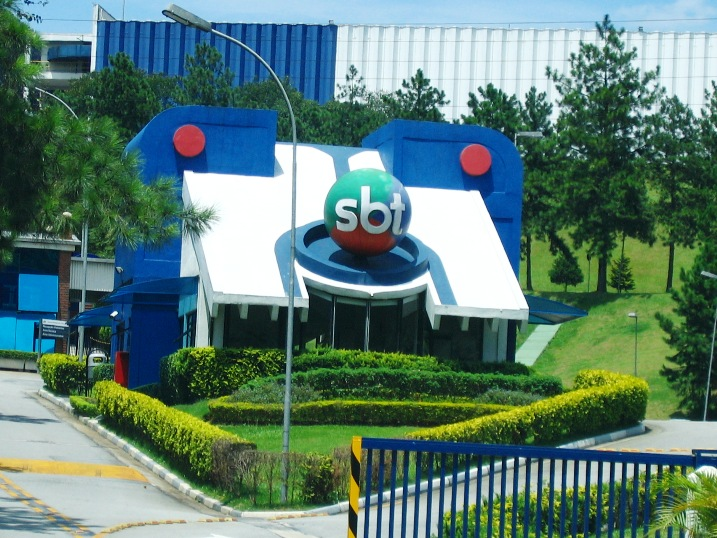
Centro de Televisão da Anhanguera in Osasco, headquarters of SBT—the second largest TV network in Brazil.

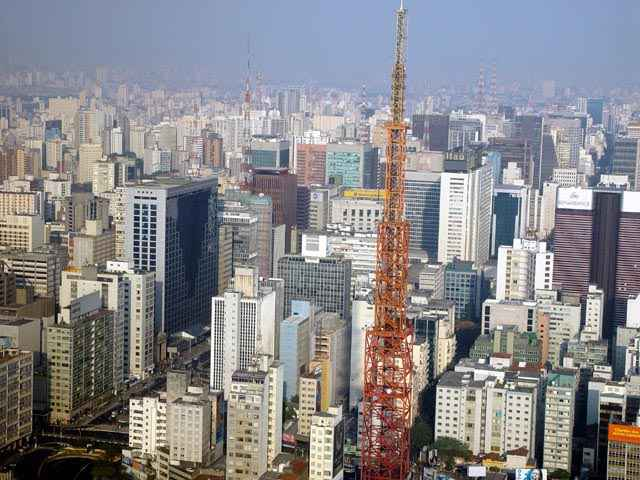
The TV Bandeirantes Tower is the tallest tower in the city of São Paulo, and one of the largest in South America.

Television became a mass medium in Brazil earlier than in most developing countries. The military dictatorship which took power in 1964 saw audiovisual communication as a tool for creating a stronger national identity, a broader consumer economy, and controlling political information. The military pushed television deeper into the population by subsidizing credit for set sales, building national microwave and satellite distribution systems, which prompted the growth of Rede Globo, which they chose as a privileged partner.

Globo, launched a few months after the 1964 coup, created the first true national network by the late 1960s. Censorship of news was extensive under the military governments between 1966 and 1978, but it also encouraged national television program production. In the early 1970s, several government ministers pushed the commercial networks to develop more Brazilian programming and reduce reliance on imported programs, particularly those with violent and sexual content. While Globo adopted an international model for operations, 90 percent of its content was produced in Brazil.

The 1960s represented a formative period for television development. Telenovelas had largely been patterned after those in other Latin American countries, even using imported scripts, but during that decade they were developed into a considerably more sophisticated genre, specifically after the airing of Beto Rockfeller, a well-produced story about a Rio de Janeiro good-lifer, in 1968 by Tupi. By the 1970s, telenovelas were the most popular programs and dominated prime time on the major networks, Globo and Tupi. Globo, in particular, began to attract major writers and actors from both film and theater to work in its telenovelas. The Brazilian telenovelas became good enough, as commercial television entertainment, to be exported throughout Latin America, Eastern Europe, Asia and Africa. Brazilian exports reached over a hundred countries and the programs have often proved to be great international hits. This is particularly the case with historical telenovelas such as Escrava Isaura.

Alongside telenovelas, the show de auditório (a form of variety show) was carried over from radio, which often featured a mix of entertainment, music, comedy, and game show segments. These shows appealed heavily to the lower- and middle-classes, and often featured content that was considered sensational and vulgar for the period—leading to them falling out of favour by the late-1960s due to the military government.

=== The rise of Rede Globo ===
From the early 1970s to late 1980s, Globo dominated both the audience and the development of television programming. It had a 60-80% share in major cities at any given time. As television researcher Joseph Straubhaar declared, "even people who might have had questions about the news almost always accepted the Globo novelas". During this period, Globo was accused of being the mouthpiece of the dictatorship, mainly because of its omission in covering the Diretas Já movement, in which thousands of Brazilians gathered on public squares to demand a direct election for president.

With Globo dominating the ratings, other broadcast television networks found themselves pursuing smaller, more specific audience segments largely defined by social class. SBT targeted lower middle class, working class and poor audiences, mostly with variety and game shows, in addition to soaps imported from Mexico's Televisa. This strategy gained it a consistent second place in ratings for most of the 1980s and 1990s. On the other hand, Manchete initially targeted a more elite audience, with news, high budget telenovelas, and imported programs, but found the segment too small to gain an adequate advertiser support. Bandeirantes tended to emphasize news, public affairs and sports. All three ultimately wished to pursue a general audience with general appeal programming, such as telenovelas, but discovered that such efforts would not generate an audience sufficient to pay for the increased programming costs.

In 1984, Globo initially supported the military government against Diretas Já, a popular campaign for the direct election of a civilian government, while other television networks, most notably Manchete, supported the change. Perceiving that it might literally lose its audience to competitors, Globo switched sides and supported the transition to a civilian regime, which was indirectly elected in a compromise situation. The new political circumstances immediately reduced political censorship and pressure on broadcasters.

=== Audience decline, Globo versus Record ===
Rede Globo ratings at 9 p.m. (2000–2015)
Year	Telenovela	Share (*)	+/-
2000–2001	Laços de Família	44.9%	-
2001	Porto dos Milagres	44.6%	-0.3%
2002	O Clone	47.0%	+2.4%
2002–2003	Esperança	38.0%	-9.0%
2003	Mulheres Apaixonadas	46.6%	+8.6%
2003–2004	Celebridade	46%	-0.6%
2004–2005	Senhora do Destino	50.4%	+4.4%
2005	América	49.4%	-1.0%
2006	Belíssima	48.5%	-0.9%
2006–2007	Páginas da Vida	46.8%	-1.7%
2007	Paraíso Tropical	42.8%	-4.0%
2007–2008	Duas Caras	41.1%	-1.7%
2008–2009	A Favorita	39.5%	-1.6%
2009	Caminho das Índias	38.8%	-0.7%
2009–2010	Viver a Vida	35.8%	-3.0%
2010–2011	Passione	35.1%	-0.7%
2011	Insensato Coração	36%	+0.9%
2011–2012	Fina Estampa	39%	+2.00%
2012	Avenida Brasil	39%	-
2012–2013	Salve Jorge	34%	-5.00%
2013–2014	Amor à Vida	36%	+2.00%
2014	Em Família	30%	-6.00%
2014–2015	Império	33%	+3.00%
2015	Babilônia	25%	-8.00%
(*) 1% comprises approximately 62,000 households in the Greater São Paulo area. Source: UOL

The 2000s saw the decline of television audience in the country, as internet access grew rapidly. The daily average of TV sets turned on dropped from 65% in 1982–1991 to 42% in 2008. In the decade, the top five TV networks in the country lost altogether 4.3% of their share. SBT lost 44% of its viewership in the prime time, while Globo lost 9%. The biggest decline for Globo were in its showcase telenovelas, aired at 9 p.m., which reached an all-time low during the decade. The network's latest telenovela in the time slot, Viver a Vida, scored the lowest ratings of the past ten years. According to Renata Pallottin, a professor at University of São Paulo's Art and Communication School, this happens because recent telenovelas, which has the same basic story sketches since the 1970s, has proven to be unappealing to younger audiences, who watch American television series on cable TV or surf the web instead. As such, telenovelas audience grew significantly older and richer in the past decade.

While other TV networks face the lack of interest among viewers, one TV network weathered the decline fairly unscathed: Rede Record. In fact, the network rose its audience by 123% in the decade, partially due to investments of over US$150 million per year. Although Globo maintains more than the double of Record's average ratings, the latter has been able to surpass Globo's audience on specific time slots, such as Sundays, and mornings. In some state capitals, such as Goiânia, Fortaleza, and Belém, for instance, Record's Domingo Espetacular already surpasses the audience of Globo's Fantástico, while Record's Fala Brasil already surpasses Globo's Bom Dia Brasil in São Paulo. Globo also faces a decrease of its audience in Rio de Janeiro, where the network is headquartered. On December 11, 2009, Record surpassed the audience of Globo in Rio during the broadcast of The Elite Squad. Almost a year later, on December 2, 2010, Globo came on an unprecedented third place in the Greater Rio ratings in the 11 p.m.–12 a.m. time slot. On a previous occasion, Record came first in the area's ratings from 7 a.m. to 12 a.m. on September 8, 2010.

A recent research conducted by Deloitte showed that surfing the web has surpassed watching TV as the entertainment activity preferred by most Brazilians. Other forms of entertainment, such as watching DVDs, and viewing cable TV have also increased their popularity significantly. From 2000 to 2010, the number of households with access to cable TV increased 152%, while the DVD market saw an expansion of 430% in the same period. The number of TV sets not turned on in any of the free-to-air channels—which indicates that they are being used for watching DVD or cable TV or playing videogames, also increased from 3.5% to 6.7% of the share in the decade. In 2010 it further increased to 7.7% of the share, surpassing the audience of Record. Cable TV accounted for 4.5% of this, while the remaining 3.2% accounted for watching DVD and/or playing videogames.

== Cable television ==
Cable television services in Brazil were allowed to start business in 1995, according to federal law 8977/95. Since then, there were no major advances in terms of access to the technology. Brazil has one of the lowest number of households with access to cable television, as a result of the combination of high prices charged by providers and the reduced purchasing power of most Brazilians. Cable television in Brazil, as of 2010, was available to only 10 million households (around 30 million viewers, which represents less than 20% of the country's population). Most of the users are from the upper class (70%). While the lower class represents 50% of the country's households, only 1% of them have access to cable television.

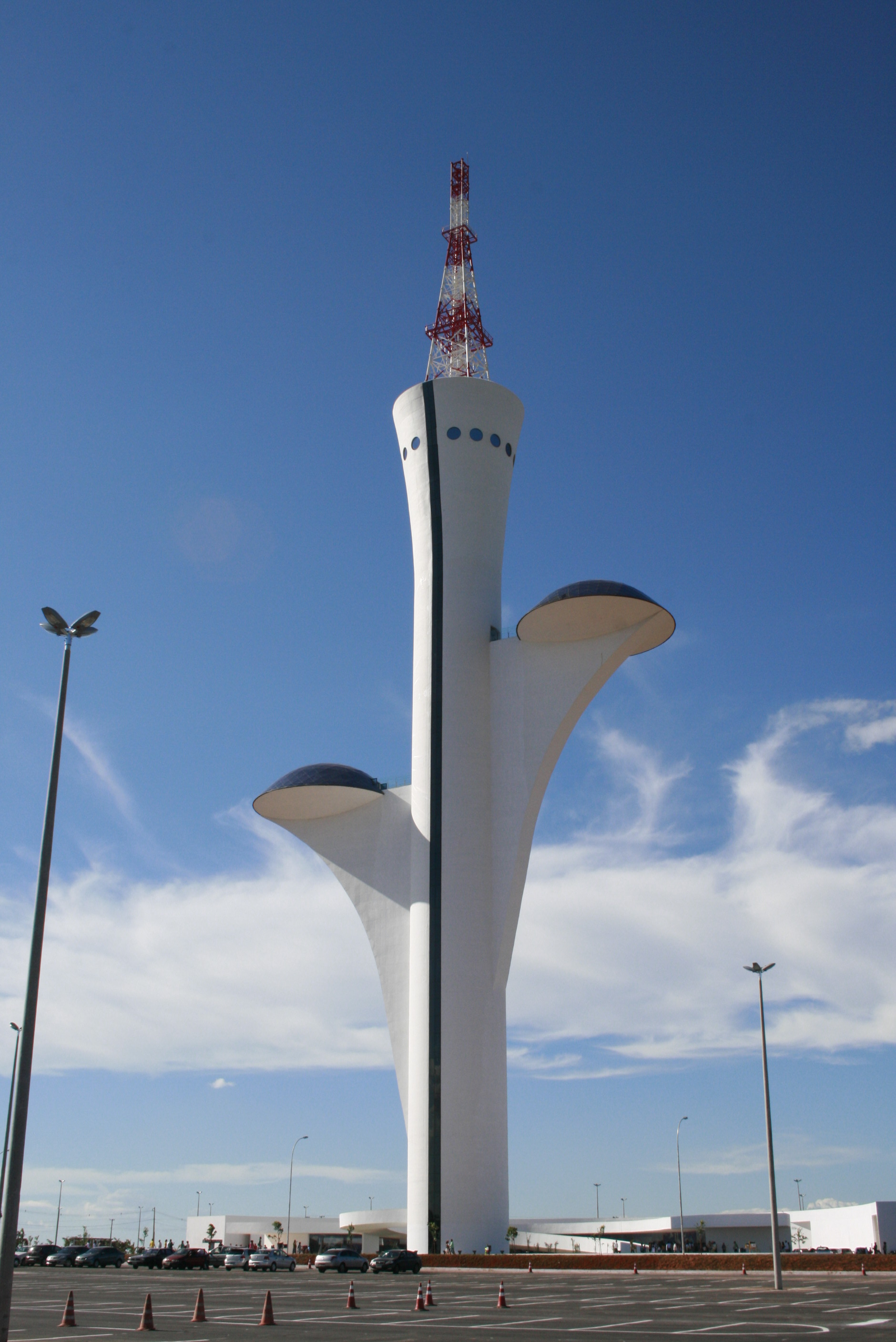
The Digital TV Tower Brasilia, dubbed Flor do Cerrado.

The cable television market used to be almost monopolized by satellite TV provider SKY Brasil and cable TV provider NET, both of them partially owned by Organizações Globo. However, in 2010, Globo sold 19% of its shares in SKY to the DirecTV Group, making Globo owner of only 7% of SKY shares. In the same year, Embratel made an offer to buy all of Globo's shares in NET for R$4.58 billion, even though Embratel has to wait the approval of Bill N° 119, that will allow companies from countries other than Brazil to own cable operations. Since 2006, large national and international phone operators, such as Embratel, Telefónica, and Oi, began to enter the market. Due to cable regulations, telephone companies are using DTH rather than IPTV to launch their TV operations. In 2010's third trimester, the market share of cable companies was: NET with 44,8%, SKY with 25,7%, Via Embratel with 9,8%, Telefónica TV Digital with 5,1%, OiTV with 3,1%, Abril (TVA) with 1,8% and smaller companies with 9,6% of the market.

== Digital television ==
Digital terrestrial television was officially adopted by Brazil on 2 December 2007, using the ISDB-T International standard, a variant of the Japanese ISDB standards which uses H.264/MPEG-4 AVC for video compression and HE-AAC for audio compression, and support for mobile television using the 1seg standard. The government estimated that it would take seven years for DTT service to become available across the country; beginning with the greater São Paulo metropolitan, Belo Horizonte in early March 2008, and Rio de Janeiro in late May 2008. Analog television will be discontinued in phases until 30 September 2023. Major Brazilian networks broadcast their digital feeds in 1080i high-definition television.

DTV in Brazil supports interactive television through the Ginga platform.

On 18 January 2022, the Fórum Sistema Brasileiro TV Digital Terrestre (SBTVD Forum) recommended the adoption of key technologies from the ATSC 3.0 standards for a second-generation digital terrestrial television platform, initially codenamed "TV 3.0", which support High Efficiency Video Coding (HEVC) for video compression, and Dolby AC-4 and MPEG-H 3D Audio for audio compression. It will allow for broadcasts in up to 4K (along with the possibility of 8K), IP-backed apps, datacasting, and over-the-top services, emergency alerting, and targeted advertising. In August 2025, the adoption of ATSC 3.0 was formalized under the branding "DTV+"; experimental services will focus primarily on São Paulo and Rio, with Globo announcing that it would have commercial DTV+ services available in these cities for the 2026 FIFA World Cup. DTV+ is expected to be officially deployed by 2027.

== Criticism ==
As referenced by journalist Eugênio Bucci, the problem of "audiovisual media ownership concentration is relatively sharper" in Brazil when compared to the United States. According to the study Donos da Mídia (English: Media owners), TV Globo alone controls 340 television stations, more than SBT and Rede Record combined. This is largely attributed to the fact that television in the country was launched in the early 1950s by the private sector, without much state regulation and control — in a manner very similar to the system of for-profit, private networks of American TV and away from the state-owned, public TV stations in Europe and in the Communist bloc.

== See also ==
- List of newspapers in Brazil
- List of Portuguese language television channels
