= Ídolos Brazil season 6 =

Ídolos Brazil
- Season 6
- Hosted by: Rodrigo Faro
- Judges: Marco Camargo; Luiza Possi; Rick Bonadio
- Winner: Henrique Lemes
- Runner-up: Higor Rocha
- Finals venue: Via Funchal

Release
- Original network: Record
- Original release: April 5 – July 14, 2011

Season chronology
- ← Previous; Season 5

Ídolos Brazil 6, also taglined as Ídolos 2011 is the sixth season of Brazilian reality interactive talent show Ídolos and fourth season aired on Record. It premiered on Tuesday, April 5, 2011.

Rodrigo Faro returned as a host from last year, while music manager–record producer Rick Bonadio and singer–actress Luiza Possi joined the judging panel as replacements for Luiz Calainho and Paula Lima who left at the end of season five.

This season had the youngest matchups of the two finalists, Henrique Lemes and Higor Rocha, who were both 16 at the time.

Henrique Lemes won the competition with Higor Rocha as the first runner-up and Hellen Caroline finishing third. The final result was leaked on the show's website circa 30 minutes before the live official announcement and pointed to Henrique's victory with 55% out of a total of 7 million votes cast.

== Early Process ==
=== Regional Auditions ===
Auditions were held in the following cities:

During this stage guest judges filled in a special fourth judging seat.

Episode Air Date	Audition City	Audition Date	Audition Venue	Guest Fourth Judge	Golden Tickets Total
April 5, 2011	Uberlândia	February 5, 2011	Tancredo Neves Arena	Alexandre Pires	26
April 7, 2011	Uberlândia	February 5, 2011	Tancredo Neves Arena	Alexandre Pires	26
April 12, 2011	Florianópolis	January 29, 2011	Nego Quirido Sambadrome	No Guest Judge	20
April 14, 2011	Florianópolis	January 29, 2011	Nego Quirido Sambadrome	No Guest Judge	20
April 19, 2011	Rio de Janeiro	February 12, 2011	Fort Copacabana	Preta Gil	22
April 21, 2011	Rio de Janeiro	February 12, 2011	Fort Copacabana	Preta Gil	22
April 26, 2011	São Paulo	February 19, 2011	Ibirapuera Arena	No Guest Judge	21
April 28, 2011	São Paulo	February 19, 2011	Ibirapuera Arena	No Guest Judge	21
Total Tickets to São Paulo					89

== São Paulo Week ==
=== Chorus Line ===
The first day of São Paulo Week featured the eighty-nine contestants from the auditions round. Divided into groups, the contestants go up on stage and individually sing a song a capella. Fifty-two advanced.

=== Groups ===
The fifty-two remaining contestants were divided in groups of four or three. They had to pick a song and sing accompanied by a soundtrack. Thirty-one advanced.

=== Solos ===
The thirty-one remaining contestants had to choose a music and singing accompanied by a band and can also play an instrument. In the end, the judges take the contestants individually and tell them if they made the final fifteen.

== Semi-finals ==
=== Semi-finalists ===
The fifteen semi-finalists were officially announced on May 12, 2011. The following are semi-finalists who failed to reach the finals.

(ages stated at time of contest)

Contestant	Age	Hometown	Audition Location	Voted Off
Dani Mota	25	Belo Horizonte	Uberlândia	May 19, 2011
Jean Vitor	29	São Bento do Sul	Florianópolis	May 19, 2011
Maynah Faria	18	Rio de Janeiro	Rio de Janeiro	May 19, 2011
Mônica Costa	18	Araguari	Uberlândia	May 19, 2011
Rafael Carvalho	17	Itabuna	São Paulo	May 19, 2011

=== Top 15 – Sing Your Idol ===
Order	Contestant	Song (Original Artist)	Result
1	Fernanda Portilho	"Pensando em Nós Dois" (Ivete Sangalo ft. Seu Jorge)	Safe
2	Higor Rocha	"Sem Radar" (LS Jack)	Safe
3	Raphael Diniz	"Mentes Tão Bem" (Zezé di Camargo & Luciano)	Safe
4	Camila Morais	"Tá Se Achando" (Guilherme & Santiago)	Safe
5	Henrique Lemes	"Morro de Saudade" (Zé Henrique & Gabriel)	Safe
6	Hellen Caroline	"1 Minuto" (D'Black ft. Negra Li)	Safe
7	Dani Mota	"Rosas" (Ana Carolina)	Eliminated
8	Maynah Faria	"Esqueça" (Marisa Monte)	Eliminated
9	Karielle Gontijo	"Pássaro de Fogo" (Paula Fernandes)	Safe
10	Rafael Carvalho	"Sinais de Fogo" (Preta Gil)	Eliminated
11	Elson Júnior	"Caçador de Mim" (Milton Nascimento)	Safe
12	Mello Júnior	"Meu Bem Querer" (Djavan)	Safe
13	Mônica Costa	"Rios de Amor" (Victor & Leo)	Eliminated
14	Jean Vitor	"Ei, Psiu! Beijo Me Liga" (Michel Teló)	Eliminated
15	Marjory Porto	"Um Dia de Domingo" (Tim Maia)	Safe

The fifteen semi-finalists performed live on May 17, 2011, with results show on the following episode which aired May 19, 2011. The 5 singers with the highest percentage of the public vote were automatically qualified for the finals. Later on night, the judges decided which 5 out of the remaining 10 semi-finalists completed the Top 10.

== Finals ==
=== Finalists ===
The ten finalists were officially announced on May 19, 2011, after the semi-final round results be revealed.

(ages stated at time of contest)

Contestant	Age	Hometown	Audition Location	Voted Off
Henrique Lemes	16	Tucunduva	Florianópolis	Winner
Higor Rocha	16	Itanhém	São Paulo	July 14, 2011
Hellen Caroline	24	Ubatuba	São Paulo	July 7, 2011
Karielle Gontijo	20	Mineiros	São Paulo	June 30, 2011
Fernanda Portilho	21	Governador Valadares	Uberlândia	June 23, 2011
Marjory Porto	26	Curitiba	Florianópolis	June 16, 2011
Elson Júnior	28	Nova Iguaçu	Rio de Janeiro	June 9, 2011
Camila Morais	21	Monte Sião	São Paulo	June 9, 2011
Mello Júnior	25	Rio Sono	São Paulo	June 2, 2011
Raphael Diniz	26	Curitiba	Florianópolis	May 26, 2011

=== Top 10 – Country ===
- Guest Judge: Paula Fernandes

Order	Contestant	Song (Original Artist)	Result
1	Karielle Gontijo	"Não Aprendi a Dizer Adeus" (Leandro & Leonardo)	Safe
2	Elson Júnior	"Os Amantes" (Daniel)	Bottom 3
3	Camila Morais	"Choram as Rosas" (Bruno & Marrone)	Bottom 2
4	Mello Júnior	"Amar Não é Pecado" (Luan Santana)	Safe
5	Higor Rocha	"Tem Que Ser Você" (Victor & Leo)	Safe
6	Fernanda Portilho	"Pra Você" (Paula Fernandes)	Safe
7	Raphael Diniz	"Aí Já Era" (Jorge & Mateus)	Eliminated
8	Marjory Porto	"Você Não Sabe o Que é Amor" (Luan Santana)	Safe
9	Henrique Lemes	"Azul" (Edson & Hudson)	Safe
10	Hellen Caroline	"Adoro Amar Você" (Daniel)	Safe

=== Top 9 – Hit Songs ===
- Guest Judge: Restart

Men sing hits from female singers and women sing hits from male singers.

Order	Contestant	Song (Original Artist)	Result
1	Mello Júnior	"Agora Eu Já Sei" (Ivete Sangalo)	Eliminated
2	Hellen Caroline	"Cedo Ou Tarde" (NX Zero)	Safe
3	Marjory Porto	"Assim Caminha a Humanidade" (Lulu Santos)	Bottom 3
4	Higor Rocha	"A Lenda" (Sandy & Junior)	Safe
5	Karielle Gontijo	"Adrenalina" (Luan Santana)	Safe
6	Fernanda Portilho	"Codinome Beija-Flor" (Cazuza)	Safe
7	Henrique Lemes	"Deixo" (Ivete Sangalo)	Safe
8	Camila Morais	"É Preciso Saber Viver" (Roberto Carlos)	Safe
9	Elson Júnior	"Pensando em Você" (Claudia Leitte)	Bottom 2

=== Top 8 – Cheesy Night ===
- Guest Judge: Falcão

Two contestants were eliminated this week.

Order	Contestant	Song (Original Artist)	Result
1	Henrique Lemes	"Cadê Você?" (Roberta Miranda)	Safe
2	Fernanda Portilho	"Nem um Toque" (Rosana)	Bottom 3
3	Elson Júnior	"Whisky a Go-Go" (Roupa Nova)	Eliminated
4	Marjory Porto	"O Amor e o Poder" (Rosana)	Safe
5	Karielle Gontijo	"Você Não Me Ensinou a Te Esquecer" (Caetano Veloso)	Safe
6	Camila Morais	"Borbulhas de Amor" (Fagner)	Eliminated
7	Higor Rocha	"Aguenta Coração" (José Augusto)	Safe
8	Hellen Caroline	"Fogo e Paixão" (Wando)	Bottom 4

=== Top 6 – Potpourri ===
- Guest Judge: Marcos & Belutti

Order	Contestant	Song (Original Artist)	Result
1	Fernanda Portilho	"Não Deixe o Samba Morrer" / "Gostoso Veneno" (Alcione)	Safe
2	Marjory Porto	"Linda Demais" / "Meu Universo é Você" (Roupa Nova)	Eliminated
3	Higor Rocha	"Só Hoje" / "O Sol" (Jota Quest)	Bottom 3
4	Hellen Caroline	"Cartas Pra Você" (NX Zero) / "Apenas Mais Uma..." (Lulu Santos)	Bottom 2
5	Karielle Gontijo	"Abalou" / "Sá Marina" (Ivete Sangalo)	Safe
6	Henrique Lemes	"De Tanto Te Querer" / "Amo Noite e Dia" (Jorge & Mateus)	Safe

=== Top 5 – Public Choice / Brazilian Charts ===
- Guest Judge: Fernando & Sorocaba

Each contestant sang two songs.

Order	Contestant	Song (Original Artist)	Result
1	Hellen Caroline	"Só Você" (Fábio Jr.)	Bottom 2
2	Henrique Lemes	"Inventor dos Amores" (Gusttavo Lima ft. Jorge & Mateus)	Safe
3	Fernanda Portilho	"Frisson" (Ivete Sangalo)	Eliminated
4	Higor Rocha	"Primavera" (Tim Maia)	Bottom 3
5	Karielle Gontijo	"Evidências" (Chitãozinho & Xororó)	Safe
6	Hellen Caroline	"Fico Assim Sem Você" (Claudinho & Buchecha)	Bottom 2
7	Henrique Lemes	"Um Beijo" (Luan Santana)	Safe
8	Fernanda Portilho	"Mina do Condomínio" (Seu Jorge)	Eliminated
9	Higor Rocha	"Vou Deixar" (Skank)	Bottom 3
10	Karielle Gontijo	"Tentativas em Vão" (Bruno & Marrone)	Safe

=== Top 4 – Pop Rock ===
- Guest Judge: Capital Inicial

Each contestant sang one solo and one duet with a fellow contestant.

Order	Contestant	Song (Original Artist)	Result
1	Karielle Gontijo	"Eu Quero Sempre Mais" (Ira! ft. Pitty)	Eliminated
2	Henrique Lemes	"Eu Quero Sempre Mais" (Ira! ft. Pitty)	Safe
3	Hellen Caroline	"Por Enquanto" (Legião Urbana)	Bottom 2
4	Higor Rocha	"Anna Júlia" (Los Hermanos)	Safe
5	Karielle Gontijo	"Equalize" (Pitty)	Eliminated
6	Henrique Lemes	"Primeiros Erros" (Capital Inicial)	Safe
7	Hellen Caroline	"Porque Eu Sei Que é Amor" (Titãs)	Bottom 2
8	Higor Rocha	"Porque Eu Sei Que é Amor" (Titãs)	Safe

=== Top 3 – Judge's Choice ===
Each contestant sang three songs chosen by: Luiza Possi (1st round), Rick Bonadio (2nd round) and Marco Camargo (3rd round).

Order	Contestant	Song (Original Artist)	Result
1	Henrique Lemes	"É Uma Partida de Futebol" (Skank)	Safe
2	Hellen Caroline	"Volta Pra Mim" (Roupa Nova)	Eliminated
3	Higor Rocha	"Me Liga" (Os Paralamas do Sucesso)	Safe
4	Henrique Lemes	"Por Te Amar Demais" (Bruno & Marrone)	Safe
5	Hellen Caroline	"Um Anjo Veio Me Falar" (Rouge)	Eliminated
6	Higor Rocha	"Lanterna dos Afogados" (Os Paralamas do Sucesso)	Safe
7	Henrique Lemes	"Madri" (Fernando & Sorocaba)	Safe
8	Hellen Caroline	"Chão de Giz" (Elba Ramalho)	Eliminated
9	Higor Rocha	"Alma Gêmea" (Fábio Jr.)	Safe

=== Top 2 – Winner's Single 1, Season's Best and Winner's Single 2 ===
Each contestant sang three songs.

Order	Contestant	Song (Original Artist)	Result
1	Henrique Lemes	"De Coração" (original song)	Winner
2	Higor Rocha	"Fica Combinado Assim" (original song)	Runner-up
3	Henrique Lemes	"Madri" (Fernando & Sorocaba)	Winner
4	Higor Rocha	"Sem Radar" (LS Jack)	Runner-up
5	Henrique Lemes	"Fica Combinado Assim" (original song)	Winner
6	Higor Rocha	"De Coração" (original song)	Runner-up

== Elimination chart ==
Legend
Female	Male	Top 15	Top 10	Winner

Safe	Safe First	Safe Last	Eliminated

Stage:		Semifinal	Finals							
Stage:		Top 15	Top 10	Top 9	Top 8	Top 6	Top 5	Top 4	Top 3	Top 2
Week:		5/19	5/26	6/2	6/9	6/16	6/23	6/30	7/7	7/14
Place	Contestant	Result								
1	Henrique Lemes	Viewers	Safe	Safe	Safe	Safe	Safe	Safe	Safe	Winner
2	Higor Rocha	Viewers	Safe	Safe	Safe	Bottom 3	Bottom 3	Safe	Safe	Runner-up
3	Hellen Caroline	Judges	Safe	Safe	Bottom 4	Bottom 2	Bottom 2	Bottom 2	Elim	
4	Karielle Gontijo	Viewers	Safe	Safe	Safe	Safe	Safe	Elim		
5	Fernanda Portilho	Judges	Safe	Safe	Bottom 3	Safe	Elim			
6	Marjory Porto	Judges	Safe	Bottom 3	Safe	Elim				
7–8	Elson Júnior	Viewers	Bottom 3	Bottom 2	Elim					
7–8	Camila Morais	Judges	Bottom 2	Safe	Elim					
9	Mello Júnior	Judges	Safe	Elim						
10	Raphael Diniz	Viewers	Elim							
11–15	Dani Mota	Elim								
11–15	Jean Vitor	Elim								
11–15	Maynah Faria	Elim								
11–15	Mônica Costa	Elim								
11–15	Rafael Carvalho	Elim								

== Results Night Performances ==
Week	Performer(s)	Title	Performance Type
Top 10	Paula Fernandes	"Pássaro de Fogo"	pre-recorded performance
Top 10	Paula Fernandes	"Pra Você"	pre-recorded performance
Top 9	Restart	"Pra Você Lembrar"	pre-recorded performance
Top 8	Falcão	"I'm Not Dog No"	pre-recorded performance
Top 6	Marcos & Belutti	"Sem Me Controlar"	pre-recorded performance
Top 6	Marcos & Belutti	"Dupla Solidão"	pre-recorded performance
Top 5	Fernando & Sorocaba	"Madri"	pre-recorded performance
Top 5	Fernando & Sorocaba	"Teus Segredos"	pre-recorded performance
Top 4	Capital Inicial	"Como Se Sente"	pre-recorded performance
Top 4	Capital Inicial	"Não Olhe Pra Trás"	pre-recorded performance
Finale	Claudia Leitte	"Famo$.a."	live performance
Finale	Claudia Leitte	"Água"	live performance
Finale	Top 10 (minus the 2 finalists) with César Menotti & Fabiano	"Como Um Anjo"	live performance
Finale	Top 10 (minus the 2 finalists) with César Menotti & Fabiano	"Ciumenta"	live performance
Finale	Higor Rocha and Henrique Lemes	1st Medley: "De Coração", "Fica Combinado Assim", "With or Without You"	live performance
Finale	Zezé di Camargo & Luciano	"Mentes Tão Bem"	live performance
Finale	2011 Top 5 Girls with Lulu Santos	"Toda Forma de Amor"	live performance
Finale	Claudia Leitte	"Trilhos Fortes"	live performance
Finale	Rebelde Cast	"Rebelde Para Sempre"	live performance
Finale	2011 Top 5 Guys with Claudia Leitte	"Exttravasa"	live performance
Finale	Lulu Santos	2nd Medley: "Já É", "SOS Solidão" "Assim Caminha a Humanidade"	live performance
Finale	Zezé di Camargo & Luciano	"Pra Mudar Minha Vida"	live performance
Finale	2011 Top 2 Finalists with Zezé di Camargo & Luciano	"Dou a Vida Por Um Beijo"	live performance
Finale	2011 Top 2 Finalists with Zezé di Camargo & Luciano	"No Dia Em Que Saí de Casa"	live performance
Finale	Rebelde Cast	"Do Jeito Que Eu Sou"	live performance
Finale	Henrique Lemes	"De Coração"	live performance
