= Ídolos Brazil season 5 =

Ídolos Brazil
- Season 5
- Hosted by: Rodrigo Faro
- Judges: Luiz Calainho; Paula Lima; Marco Camargo
- Winner: Israel Lucero
- Runner-up: Tom Black
- Finals venue: Via Funchal

Release
- Original network: Record
- Original release: June 10 – September 23, 2010

Season chronology
- ← Previous; Season 4 Next → Season 6

Ídolos Brazil 5, also taglined as Ídolos 2010 was the fifth season of Brazilian reality interactive talent show Ídolos and third season aired on Record. It premiered on Thursday, June 10, 2010, with a 2-hour special premiere.

Rodrigo Faro returned as a host from last year and the judging panel again consists of Luiz Calainho, Paula Lima and Marco Camargo.

Israel Lucero won the competition with Tom Black as the first runner-up and Nise Palhares finishing third.

Judges Luiz Calainho and Paula Lima left the show after this season ended, although only Calainho's departure was announced in advance.

== Early Process ==
=== Regional Auditions ===
Auditions were held in the following cities:

During this stage guest judges filled in a special fourth judging seat.

Episode Air Date	Audition City	Audition Date	Audition Venue	Guest Fourth Judge
June 10, 2010	Florianópolis	April 10, 2010	Nego Quirido Sambadrome	Luiza Possi
June 15, 2010	Florianópolis	April 10, 2010	Nego Quirido Sambadrome	Luiza Possi
June 15, 2010	Rio de Janeiro	April 17, 2010	João Havelange Olympic Stadium	Marcelo D2
June 17, 2010	Rio de Janeiro	April 17, 2010	João Havelange Olympic Stadium	Marcelo D2
June 22, 2010	Fortaleza	March 27, 2010	Paulo Sarasate Gymnasium	Reginaldo Rossi
June 24, 2010	Fortaleza	March 27, 2010	Paulo Sarasate Gymnasium	Reginaldo Rossi
June 29, 2010	São Paulo	April 24, 2010	Anhembi Sambadrome	Peninha
July 1, 2010	São Paulo	April 24, 2010	Anhembi Sambadrome	Peninha

== Theater Round ==
=== Chorus Line ===
The first day of Theater Week featured the eighty-three contestants from the auditions round. Divided into groups, the contestants go up on stage and individually sing a song a capella. Fifty-two advanced.

=== Groups ===
The fifty-two remaining contestants were divided in groups of four or three. They had to pick a song and sing accompanied by a soundtrack. Thirty advanced.

=== Solos ===
The thirty remaining contestants had to choose a music and singing accompanied by a band and can also play an instrument. In the end, the judges take the contestants individually and tell them if they made the final fifteen.

== Semi-finals ==
=== Semi-finalists ===
The fifteen semi-finalists were officially announced on July 22, 2010.

(ages stated at time of contest)

Contestant	Age	Hometown	Audition Location	Voted Off
Bruno Fraga	18	Rio de Janeiro	Rio de Janeiro	July 29, 2010
Juliana Suriano	23	Rio de Janeiro	Rio de Janeiro	July 29, 2010
Phil Batista	23	São Leopoldo	Florianópolis	July 29, 2010
Renata Alves	17	Pinhais	Florianópolis	July 29, 2010
Thayse Carneiro	17	Chapadina	Fortaleza	July 29, 2010

The fifteen semi-finalists performed live on July 27, 2010, with results show on the following episode which aired on July 29, 2010. The five singers with the highest percentage of the public vote were automatically qualified for the finals. Later on night, the judges decided which five out of the remaining ten semi-finalists completed the Top 10.

=== Top 15 – Sing Your Idol ===
Order	Contestant	Song (Original Artist)	Result
1	Romero Ribeiro	"Eu Sou o Samba" (Alexandre Pires ft. Seu Jorge)	Safe
2	Renata Alves	"Escudos" (Maria Gadú)	Eliminated
3	Israel Lucero	"A Fila Anda" (Leonardo)	Safe
4	Juliani Fernandes	"Mania de Você" (Rita Lee)	Safe
5	Chay Suede	"Jorge Maravilha" (Chico Buarque)	Safe
6	Agnes Jamille	"Encontros e Despedidas" (Maria Rita)	Safe
7	Maria Alice	"Lilás" (Djavan)	Safe
8	Thayse Carneiro	"Quem de Nós Dois" (Ana Carolina)	Eliminated
9	Tom Black	"Solidão" (Sandra de Sá)	Safe
10	Nise Palhares	"Luz dos Olhos" (Cássia Eller)	Safe
11	Juliana Suriano	"Fera Ferida" (Maria Bethânia)	Eliminated
12	Rodrigo Valentim	"Azul" (Edson & Hudson)	Safe
13	Tamires Santana	"Nossa Canção" (Roberto Carlos)	Safe
14	Phil Batista	"Nem um Dia" (Djavan)	Eliminated
15	Bruno Fraga	"Uma Carta" (LS Jack)	Eliminated

== Finals ==
=== Finalists ===
The ten finalists were officially announced on July 29, 2010, after the semi-final round results be revealed.

(ages stated at time of contest)

Contestant	Age	Hometown	Audition Location	Voted Off
Israel Lucero	16	São Borja	Florianópolis	Winner
Tom Black	25	São Francisco do Conde	Fortaleza	September 23, 2010
Nise Palhares	28	Rio de Janeiro	Rio de Janeiro	September 16, 2010
Chay Suede	18	Vila Velha	Rio de Janeiro	September 9, 2010
Romero Ribeiro	25	Rio de Janeiro	Fortaleza	September 2, 2010
Maria Alice	24	Bauru	Florianópolis	August 26, 2010
Rodrigo Valentim	25	Santa Cecília	Florianópolis	August 19, 2010
Tamires Santana	20	Salvador	São Paulo	August 19, 2010
Agnes Jamille	21	São Paulo	São Paulo	August 12, 2010
Juliani Fernandes	21	Florianópolis	Florianópolis	August 5, 2010

=== Top 10 – Jovem Guarda ===
- Guest Judge: Eduardo Araújo

Order	Contestant	Song (Original Artist)	Result
1	Maria Alice	"Garota do Roberto" (Waldirene)	Safe
2	Tom Black	"Vem Quente..." (Erasmo Carlos)	Safe
3	Tamires Santana	"Esqueça" (Roberto Carlos)	Bottom 3
4	Chay Suede	"Feche os Olhos" (Renato e Seus Blue Caps)	Bottom 2
5	Agnes Jamille	"Eu Te Amo, Te Amo, Te Amo" (Roberto Carlos)	Safe
6	Romero Ribeiro	"O Ritmo da Chuva" (Demetrius)	Safe
7	Rodrigo Valentim	"O Bom" (Eduardo Araújo)	Safe
8	Juliani Fernandes	"Banho de Lua" (Celly Campelo)	Eliminated
9	Israel Lucero	"É Preciso Saber Viver" (Roberto Carlos)	Safe
10	Nise Palhares	"Era um Garoto Que..." (Os Incríveis)	Safe

=== Top 9 – Love Songs ===
Order	Contestant	Song (Original Artist)	Result
1	Agnes Jamille	"Gostava Tanto de Você" (Tim Maia)	Eliminated
2	Chay Suede	"Todo Amor que Houver Nessa Vida" (Cazuza)	Safe
3	Nise Palhares	"Amor, Meu Grande Amor" (Angela Ro Ro)	Safe
4	Tom Black	"1 Minuto" (D'Black ft. Negra Li)	Safe
5	Romero Ribeiro	"Outdoor" (Só Pra Contrariar)	Bottom 3
6	Maria Alice	"Meu Bem Querer" (Djavan)	Safe
7	Rodrigo Valentim	"Meteoro" (Luan Santana)	Safe
8	Tamires Santana	"Verdade" (Zeca Pagodinho)	Bottom 2
9	Israel Lucero	"Tapa na Cara" (Zezé Di Camargo & Luciano)	Safe

=== Top 8 – Country ===
- Guest Judge: Lucas Silveira

Order	Contestant	Song (Original Artist)	Result
1	Israel Lucero	"Ciumenta" (César Menotti e Fabiano)	Safe
2	Rodrigo Valentim	"Fio de Cabelo" (Chitãozinho & Xororó)	Eliminated
3	Tamire Santana	"É O Amor" (Zezé di Camargo & Luciano)	Eliminated
4	Romero Ribeiro	"Pense Em Mim" (Leandro & Leonardo)	Safe
5	Nise Palhares	"Evidências" (Chitãozinho & Xororó)	Bottom 4
6	Tom Black	"Os Amantes" (Daniel)	Safe
7	Maria Alice	"Chovendo Estrelas" (Guilherme & Santiago)	Bottom 3
8	Chay Suede	"Vida Boa" (Victor & Leo)	Safe

=== Top 6 – 2000's Hits ===
- Guest Judge: Di Ferrero

Order	Contestant	Song (Original Artist)	Result
1	Chay Suede	"Saideira" (Skank)	Bottom 2
2	Maria Alice	"Sem Ar" (D'Black)	Eliminated
3	Romero Ribeiro	"Deixa A Vida Me Levar" (Zeca Pagodinho)	Safe
4	Tom Black	"Bem Querer" (Maurício Manieri)	Safe
5	Israel Lucero	"Dormi Na Praça" (Bruno & Marrone)	Safe
6	Nise Palhares	"A Lua Q Eu T Dei" (Ivete Sangalo)	Bottom 3

=== Top 5 – Popular Songs ===
- Guest Judges: Joelma & Chimbinha

Each contestant sang two songs.

Order	Contestant	Song (Original Artist)	Result
1	Nise Palhares	"Sandra Rosa Madalena" (Sidney Magal)	Bottom 3
2	Israel Lucero	"Você Não Me Ensinou..." (Caetano Veloso)	Safe
3	Romero Ribeiro	"Aguenta Coração" (José Augusto)	Eliminated
4	Chay Suede	"Vou Tirar Você Desse Lugar" (Odair José)	Bottom 2
5	Tom Black	"Mon Amour, Meu Bem..." (Reginaldo Rossi)	Safe
6	Nise Palhares	"Nuvem de Lágrimas" (Chitãozinho & Xororó)	Bottom 3
7	Israel Lucero	"Estrada da Vida" (Milionário & José Rico)	Safe
8	Romero Ribeiro	"Fogo e Paixão" (Wando)	Eliminated
9	Chay Suede	"Eu Não Sou Cachorro Não" (Waldick Soriano)	Bottom 2
10	Tom Black	"Nem Um Toque" (Rosana)	Safe

=== Top 4 – The Festivals & Bossa Nova ===
- Guest Judge: Luiza Possi

Each contestant sang one solo and one duet with a fellow contestant.

Order	Contestant	Song (Original Artist)	Result
1	Nise Palhares	"Roda Viva" (Chico Buarque)	Bottom 2
2	Chay Suede	"Alegria, Alegria" (Caetano Veloso)	Eliminated
3	Nise Palhares	"Chega de Saudade" (Tom Jobim)	Bottom 2
4	Chay Suede	"Chega de Saudade" (Tom Jobim)	Eliminated
5	Tom Black	"Fio Maravilha" (Maria Alcina)	Safe
6	Israel Lucero	"Disparada" (Jair Rodrigues)	Safe
7	Tom Black	"Wave" (Tom Jobim)	Safe
8	Israel Lucero	"Wave" (Tom Jobim)	Safe

=== Top 3 – Judges' Choice, Public's Choice & Contestant's Choice ===
Each contestant sang three songs.

Order	Contestant	Song (Original Artist)	Result
1	Israel Lucero	"Amigo Apaixonado" (Victor & Leo) — Marco	Safe
2	Nise Palhares	"Gostoso Veneno" (Alcione) — Paula	Eliminated
3	Tom Black	"Detalhes" (Roberto Carlos) — Calainho	Safe
4	Israel Lucero	"Pra Nunca Dizer Adeus" (Leonardo)	Safe
5	Nise Palhares	"Por Enquanto" (Cássia Eller)	Eliminated
6	Tom Black	"I'll Be There" (The Jackson 5)	Safe
7	Israel Lucero	"Mi Universo Eres Tu" (Zezé di Camargo & Luciano)	Safe
8	Nise Palhares	"Se Você Pensa" (Roberto Carlos)	Eliminated
9	Tom Black	"A Lua e Eu" (Cassiano)	Safe

=== Top 2 – Winner's Single 1, Season's Best & Winner's Single 2 ===
- Guest Judge: Branco Mello

Each contestant sang three songs.

Order	Contestant	Song (Original Artist)	Result
1	Israel Lucero	"Sem Juízo" (original song)	Winner
2	Tom Black	"Que Prazer" (original song)	Runner-up
3	Israel Lucero	"Fã" (Christian & Cristiano)	Winner
4	Tom Black	"A Lua e Eu" (Cassiano)	Runner-up
5	Israel Lucero	"Que Prazer" (original song)	Winner
6	Tom Black	"Sem Juízo" (original song)	Runner-up

== Elimination Chart ==
Legend
Female	Male	Top 15	Top 10	Winner

Safe	Safe First	Safe Last	Eliminated

Stage:		Semifinal	Finals							
Stage:		Top 15	Top 10	Top 9	Top 8	Top 6	Top 5	Top 4	Top 3	Top 2
Week:		7/29	8/5	8/12	8/19	8/26	9/2	9/9	9/16	9/23
Place	Contestant	Result								
1	Israel Lucero	Viewers	Safe	Safe	Safe	Safe	Safe	Safe	Safe	Winner
2	Tom Black	Viewers	Safe	Safe	Safe	Safe	Safe	Safe	Safe	Runner-up
3	Nise Palhares	Viewers	Safe	Safe	Bottom 4	Bottom 3	Bottom 3	Bottom 2	Elim	
4	Chay Suede	Viewers	Bottom 2	Safe	Safe	Bottom 2	Bottom 2	Elim		
5	Romero Ribeiro	Judges	Safe	Bottom 3	Safe	Safe	Elim			
6	Maria Alice	Judges	Safe	Safe	Bottom 3	Elim				
7–8	Rodrigo Valentim	Viewers	Safe	Safe	Elim					
7–8	Tamires Santana	Judges	Bottom 3	Bottom 2	Elim					
9	Agnes Jamille	Judges	Safe	Elim						
10	Juliani Fernandes	Judges	Elim							
11–15	Bruno Fraga	Elim								
11–15	Juliana Suriano	Elim								
11–15	Phil Batista	Elim								
11–15	Renata Alves	Elim								
11–15	Thayse Carneiro	Elim								

== Results Night Performances ==
Week	Performer(s)	Title	Performance Type
Top 10	Eduardo Araújo	"Rua Augusta"	live performance
Top 8	Edson Cadorini	"Uma Música Para Você"	live performance
Top 6	NX Zero	"Só Rezo"	live performance
Top 6	NX Zero	"Espero a Minha Vez"	live performance
Top 5	Marcio Greyck	"Aparências"	live performance
Top 4	Luiza Possi	"Ao Meu Redor"	live performance
Top 3	Marcos & Belutti	"Sem Me Controlar"	live performance
Top 2 Finale	Ed Motta and Top 10	"Espaço na Van"	live performance
Top 2 Finale	Ed Motta and Top 10	"Colombina"	live performance
Top 2 Finale	Ed Motta and Top 10	"Fora da Lei"	live performance
Top 2 Finale	Daniel	"Disparada"	live performance
Top 2 Finale	Ed Motta and Billy Paul	"Your Song"	live performance

== Ratings ==
=== Brazilian Ratings ===
Show	Episode	First Air Date	SP				RJ				Source
Show	Episode	First Air Date	Points		Share	Rank Timeslot	Points		Share	Rank Timeslot	Source
Show	Episode	First Air Date	Avge	Peak	Share	Rank Timeslot	Avge	Peak	Share	Rank Timeslot	Source
1–2	SC Auditions	June 10, 2010	11	14	22%	#2	15	17	30%	#2	
3	RJ Auditions	June 15, 2010	09	10	21%	#2	15	17	32%	#2	
4	RJ Auditions	June 17, 2010	11	12	22%	#2	17	19	32%	#1	
5	CE Auditions	June 22, 2010	11	13	23%	#2	16	18	33%	#1	
6	CE Auditions	June 24, 2010	12	14	23%	#2	15	17	30%	#1	
7	SP Auditions	June 29, 2010	12	15	26%	#2	15	17	32%	#1	
8	SP Auditions	July 1, 2010	11	13	24%	#2	15	17	30%	#2	
9	Season Best	July 6, 2010	12	15	27%	#2	17	19	35%	#1	
10	Theater Round, Part 1	July 8, 2010	11	13	24%	#2	17	19	35%	#1	
11	Theater Round, Part 2	July 13, 2010	11	13	24%	#2	17	19	35%	#1	
12	Theater Round, Part 3	July 15, 2010	12	14	24%	#1	15	17	30%	#2	
13	Theater Round, Part 4	July 20, 2010	12	14	24%	#2	17	19	34%	#1	
14	Theater Round, Part 5	July 22, 2010	12	15	25%	#1	15	16	30%	#1	
15	Semifinal Perform Show	July 27, 2010	10	12	22%	#2	13	15	29%	#1	
16	Semifinal Results Show	July 29, 2010	11	13	24%	#1	15	17	32%	#1	
17	Top 10 Finalists Perform	August 3, 2010	12	14	26%	#2	18	20	35%	#1	
18	Top 10 Finalists Results	August 5, 2010	09	12	17%	#2	13	18	26%	#2	
19	Top 9 Finalists Perform	August 10, 2010	10	13	19%	#2	16	18	32%	#1	
20	Top 9 Finalists Results	August 12, 2010	10	14	22%	#2	14	18	29%	#1	
21	Top 8 Finalists Perform	August 17, 2010	—N/a	—N/a	—N/a	#2	—N/a	—N/a	—N/a	#2	—N/a
22	Top 8 Finalists Results	August 19, 2010	—N/a	—N/a	—N/a	#2	—N/a	—N/a	—N/a	#2	—N/a
23	Top 6 Finalists Perform	August 24, 2010	11	13	25%	#2	15	17	36%	#1	
24	Top 6 Finalists Results	August 26, 2010	09	11	20%	#2	14	16	29%	#2	
25	Top 5 Finalists Perform	August 31, 2010	—N/a	—N/a	—N/a	#2	—N/a	—N/a	—N/a	#2	—N/a
26	Top 5 Finalists Results	September 2, 2010	—N/a	—N/a	—N/a	#2	—N/a	—N/a	—N/a	#2	—N/a
27	Top 4 Finalists Perform	September 7, 2010	10	12	23%	#2	14	16	32%	#1	
28	Top 4 Finalists Results	September 9, 2010	10	13	21%	#2	14	15	29%	#2	
29	Top 3 Finalists Perform	September 14, 2010	12	16	26%	#1	15	17	32%	#1	
30	Top 3 Finalists Results	September 16, 2010	—N/a	—N/a	—N/a	#2	—N/a	—N/a	—N/a	#1	—N/a
31	Top 2 Finalists Perform	September 21, 2010	—N/a	—N/a	—N/a	#2	—N/a	—N/a	—N/a	#1	—N/a
32	Final: Winner Revealed	September 23, 2010	12	15	28%	#1	17	20	38%	#1	

- Each point represents 60.000 households in São Paulo and 37.000 households in Rio de Janeiro.
