= 2009 in Brazilian television =

This is a list of Brazilian television related events from 2009.

== Events ==
- 7 April - Max Porto wins the ninth season of Big Brother Brasil.
- 28 June - Actress Paolla Oliveira and her partner Atila Amaral win the sixth season of Dança dos Famosos.
- 16 December - Saulo Roston wins the fourth season of Ídolos Brazil. He had eliminated from the third season's top 30.

== Debuts ==
- 20 April - Peixonauta (2009–2015)

== Television shows ==
=== 1970s ===
- Vila Sésamo (1972-1977, 2007–present)
- Turma da Mônica (1976–present)

=== 1990s ===
- Malhação (1995–2020)
- Cocoricó (1996–2013)

=== 2000s ===
- Big Brother Brasil (2002–2012)
- Dança do s Famosos (2005–present)
- Ídolos (2006-2012)

== Networks and services ==
=== Launches ===
Network	Type	Launch date	Notes	Source
Discovery Theater	Cable and satellite	15 April		
Japao Brasil Network Television	Cable television	31 August		
TLC HD	Cable and satellite	1 December		
VH1 HD	Cable television	1 December		
TV Verdade	Cable and satellite	26 December		

=== Closures ===
Network	Type	Closure date	Notes	Source
FizTV	Cable television	20 July		

== Deaths ==
Date	Name	Age	Cinematic Credibility
13 November	Mara Manzan	57	Brazilian actress

== See also ==
- 2009 in Brazil
- List of Brazilian films of 2009
