= The Voice Brasil season 1 =

The Voice Brasil
- Season 1
- Hosted by: Tiago Leifert; Danni Suzuki (Backstage)
- Coaches: Lulu Santos; Carlinhos Brown; Claudia Leitte; Daniel
- No. of contestants: 48
- Winner: Ellen Oléria
- Winning coach: Carlinhos Brown
- Runners-up: Ju Moraes; Liah Soares; Maria Christina

Release
- Original network: Globo
- Original release: September 23 – December 16, 2012

Season chronology
- Next → Season 2

The first season of The Voice Brasil premiered on Globo on Sunday, September 23, 2012 in the 2:30 / 1:30 p.m. (BRT / AMT) daytime slot.

On December 16, 2012, Ellen Oléria from Team Brown won the competition with 39% of the final vote over Ju Moraes (Team Claudia), Liah Soares (Team Daniel) and Maria Christina (Team Lulu).

== Selection process ==
Auditions

Cities where the auditions were held.

Online applications for The Voice Brasil were open from May 13 to July 23, 2012. Selected applications were then called to regional auditions held in eight capital cities across Brazil:

Date	Location
June 2, 2012	Brasília
June 9, 2012	Porto Alegre
June 16, 2012	Belo Horizonte
June 29, 2012	Rio de Janeiro
July 11, 2012	Recife
July 13, 2012	Salvador
July 20, 2012	São Paulo
July 28, 2012	Natal

Over 20.000 singers sent online applications, but only 105 of them were selected to perform on the blind audition phase.

== Teams ==
Key

Winner
Runner-up

Eliminated in the Live Shows
Eliminated in the Live Playoffs

Stolen in the Battles
Eliminated in the Battles

Coaches	Top 48 artists					
Lulu Santos						
Lulu Santos	Maria Christina	Késia Estácio	Marquinho Osócio	Gabriel Levan	Lorena Lessa	Patricia Rezende
Lulu Santos	Greicy Schwendner	Luana Mallet	Thaís Moreira	~~Gustavo Fagundes~~	~~Nayra Costa~~	Diego Azevedo
Lulu Santos	Luciana Spedo	Luiza Dreyer	Samantha Carpinelli			
Carlinhos Brown						
Carlinhos Brown	Ellen Oléria	Ludmillah Anjos	Mira Callado	Dani Morais	Quesia Luz	Rafah
Carlinhos Brown	Dani Montuori	Karla da Silva	Mayara Prado	~~Júnior Meirelles~~	~~Maria Christina~~	~~Sandra Honda~~
Carlinhos Brown	Bruno & Camila	Eloisa Olinto	Karol Cândido			
Claudia Leitte						
Claudia Leitte	Ju Moraes	Thalita Pertuzatti	Ana Rafaela	Bella Stone	Gustavo Fagundes	Nayra Costa
Claudia Leitte	Breno Lima	Grace Carvalho	Sandra Honda	~~Karla da Silva~~	~~Priscylla Lisboa~~	~~Vinny Brito~~
Claudia Leitte	Juliana Gomes	Marianna Eis	Paulo Loureiro			
Daniel						
Daniel	Liah Soares	Danilo Dyba	Júnior Meirelles	Alma Thomas	Carol Marques	Pedro Eduardo
Daniel	Fernando Cruz	Priscylla Lisboa	Vinny Brito	~~Dani Montouri~~	~~Dani Morais~~	~~Luana Mallet~~
Daniel	~~Thaís Moreira~~	Barbara Mendes	Natálie Mendes			
Note: Italicized names are stolen artists (names struck through within former teams).

== Blind auditions ==
Key

✔	Coach pressed "I WANT YOU" button
	Artist defaulted to a coach's team
	Artist picked a coach's team
	Artist eliminated with no coach pressing their "I WANT YOU" button

Episode	Order	Artist	Age	Hometown	Song	Coach's and contestant's choices			
Episode	Order	Artist	Age	Hometown	Song	Lulu	Brown	Claudia	Daniel
Episode 1 (September 23, 2012)	1	Gabriel Levan	19	Porto Alegre	"Come Together"	✔	–	–	✔
Episode 1 (September 23, 2012)	2	Liah Soares	32	Araguaia	"As Rosas Não Falam"	✔	✔	✔	✔
Episode 1 (September 23, 2012)	3	Gabriel Camilo	22	Belo Horizonte	"A Lua Que Eu Te Dei"	–	–	–	–
Episode 1 (September 23, 2012)	4	Bruno & Camila	22–19	Campinas	"Just a Kiss"	–	✔	–	–
Episode 1 (September 23, 2012)	5	Hercinho Gouveia	22	Recife	"Oh! Chuva"	–	–	–	–
Episode 1 (September 23, 2012)	6	Ellen Oléria	29	Brasília	"Zumbi"	✔	✔	✔	✔
Episode 1 (September 23, 2012)	7	Breno Lima	22	São Luís	"Do Seu Lado"	–	✔	✔	–
Episode 1 (September 23, 2012)	8	Gustavo Fagundes	21	Rio de Janeiro	"Viva la Vida"	✔	✔	✔	✔
Episode 1 (September 23, 2012)	9	Mayara Prado	23	Goiânia	"Fruto Especial"	–	✔	–	–
Episode 1 (September 23, 2012)	10	Alma Thomas	29	New York City, United States	"Someone like You"	✔	✔	✔	✔
Episode 1 (September 23, 2012)	11	Greicy Schwendner	28	São Bento do Sul	"Tempos Modernos"	✔	–	–	–
Episode 1 (September 23, 2012)	12	Karol Cândido	25	Belo Horizonte	"Negro Gato"	–	✔	✔	–
Episode 1 (September 23, 2012)	13	Marianna Eis	21	Rio de Janeiro	"Moves like Jagger"	–	–	✔	–
Episode 1 (September 23, 2012)	14	Yuri Maison	34	Tangará da Serra	"Sinônimos"	–	–	–	–
Episode 2 (September 30, 2012)	1	Ju Moraes	26	Conceição do Jacuípe	"Amado"	–	✔	✔	✔
Episode 2 (September 30, 2012)	2	Patricia Rezende	30	Belo Horizonte	"Final Feliz"	✔	–	–	–
Episode 2 (September 30, 2012)	3	Pedro Eduardo	29	Brasília	"60 Segundos"	–	–	–	✔
Episode 2 (September 30, 2012)	4	Tay Cristelo	36	Rio de Janeiro	"Primeiros Erros"	–	–	–	–
Episode 2 (September 30, 2012)	5	Marquinho Osócio	34	Rio de Janeiro	"Cada Um, Cada Um"	✔	✔	✔	✔
Episode 2 (September 30, 2012)	6	Ana Rafaela	18	Cuiabá	"Ainda Bem"	–	–	✔	–
Episode 2 (September 30, 2012)	7	Sidney do Cerrado	45	Ituiutaba	"Solidão"	–	–	–	–
Episode 2 (September 30, 2012)	8	Juliana Gomes	21	Uberaba	"Quando a Chuva Passar"	✔	✔	✔	✔
Episode 2 (September 30, 2012)	9	Quesia Luz	22	Salvador	"If I Ain't Got You"	–	✔	✔	–
Episode 2 (September 30, 2012)	10	Diego Azevedo	22	Brasília	"A Estrada"	✔	–	✔	✔
Episode 2 (September 30, 2012)	11	Thaís Moreira	30	Brasília	"Evidências"	–	–	–	✔
Episode 2 (September 30, 2012)	12	Priscylla Lisboa	20	Brasília	"I'm Yours"	–	✔	✔	–
Episode 2 (September 30, 2012)	13	Mira Callado	30	Rio de Janeiro	"Na Estrada"	✔	✔	✔	✔
Episode 2 (September 30, 2012)	14	Mell Peck	20	Sapucaia do Sul	"Eu"	–	–	–	–
Episode 2 (September 30, 2012)	15	Karla da Silva	28	Rio de Janeiro	"Serrado"	–	–	✔	–
Episode 2 (September 30, 2012)	16	Junior Meirelles	38	São Paulo	"Nada Mais"	–	✔	✔	✔
Episode 3 (October 7, 2012)	1	Daniel Dyba	24	Porto União	"Inventor dos Amores"	✔	–	–	✔
Episode 3 (October 7, 2012)	2	Bella Stone	22	Pelotas	"All of Me"	–	–	✔	✔
Episode 3 (October 7, 2012)	3	Sérgio Henrique	39	Curitiba	"Noite do Prazer"	–	–	–	–
Episode 3 (October 7, 2012)	4	Késia Estácio	27	Nova Iguaçu	"Como Vai Você"	✔	✔	✔	✔
Episode 3 (October 7, 2012)	5	Luiza Dreyer	21	Rio de Janeiro	"Back to Black"	✔	✔	–	–
Episode 3 (October 7, 2012)	6	Dani Morais	28	Pedra Azul	"Flores"	–	–	–	✔
Episode 3 (October 7, 2012)	7	Barbara Mendes	39	Belo Horizonte	"Sina"	–	–	–	✔
Episode 3 (October 7, 2012)	8	Eloisa Olinto	28	Campina Grande	"Cabide"	–	✔	–	–
Episode 3 (October 7, 2012)	9	Maria Christina	23	São Paulo	"Carnavália"	–	✔	–	–
Episode 3 (October 7, 2012)	10	Nathalie Alvim	21	São Paulo	"You Give Me Something"	–	–	–	–
Episode 3 (October 7, 2012)	11	Paulo Loureiro	42	Rio de Janeiro	"Pétala"	✔	–	✔	✔
Episode 3 (October 7, 2012)	12	Natalie Christina	29	Araçatuba	"Stand by Me"	–	–	✔	✔
Episode 3 (October 7, 2012)	13	Luciana Spedo	36	Recreio	"Não Vou Ficar"	✔	–	–	–
Episode 3 (October 7, 2012)	14	Ricco	19	Viamão	"Ideologia"	–	–	–	–
Episode 3 (October 7, 2012)	15	Grace Carvalho	32	Goiânia	"Dança da Solidão"	–	–	✔	✔
Episode 3 (October 7, 2012)	16	Rafah	29	Rio de Janeiro	"Não Deixe o Samba Morrer"	✔	✔	✔	✔
Episode 4 (October 14, 2012)	1	Thalita Pertuzatti	23	Itaboraí	"Força Estranha"	–	✔	✔	✔
Episode 4 (October 14, 2012)	2	Fernando Cruz	23	Porto Seguro	"Malandragem"	–	–	–	✔
Episode 4 (October 14, 2012)	3	Dani Montuori	28	São José dos Campos	"Ain't No Sunshine"	–	–	–	✔
Episode 4 (October 14, 2012)	4	Raphael de Oliveira	28	Rio de Janeiro	"Samurai"	–	–	–	–
Episode 4 (October 14, 2012)	5	Carol Marques	31	Itapira	"Codinome Beija-Flor"	–	✔	–	✔
Episode 4 (October 14, 2012)	6	Lívia Dettes	24	Santa Helena de Goiás	"Por Um Minuto"	–	–	–	–
Episode 4 (October 14, 2012)	7	Don Neves	29	Americana	"Garota de Ipanema"	–	–	–	–
Episode 4 (October 14, 2012)	8	Samantha Carpinelli	30	Teófilo Otoni	"Nuvem de Lágrimas"	✔	–	–	–
Episode 4 (October 14, 2012)	9	Sandra Honda	32	São Paulo	"Lovin' You"	–	✔	–	–
Episode 4 (October 14, 2012)	10	Ananda Góes	22	Valença	"Garçom"	–	–	–	–
Episode 4 (October 14, 2012)	11	Lorena Lessa	22	Florianópolis	"Por Enquanto"	✔	✔	–	✔
Episode 4 (October 14, 2012)	12	Vinny Brito	26	Nova Iguaçu	"Monalisa"	–	–	✔	–
Episode 4 (October 14, 2012)	13	Ludmillah Anjos	27	Salvador	"Vapor Barato"	–	✔	Team full	–
Episode 4 (October 14, 2012)	14	Régis & Túlio	24–21	Ituiutaba	"Nova York"	–	Team full	Team full	–
Episode 4 (October 14, 2012)	15	Nayra Costa	28	Fortaleza	"Mercedes Benz"	✔	Team full	Team full	✔
Episode 4 (October 14, 2012)	16	Luana Mallet	27	Rio de Janeiro	"Tigresa"	Team full	Team full	Team full	✔

== Battles ==
Coaches' advisors
Lulu Santos	Carlinhos Brown	Claudia Leitte	Daniel
Preta Gil	Rogerio Flausino	Ed Motta	Luiza Possi

Key

Artist won the Battle and advanced to the Live shows
Artist lost the Battle but was stolen by another coach and advanced to the Live shows
Artist lost the Battle and was eliminated

Episode	Coach	Order	Winner	Song	Loser	Steal result			
Episode	Coach	Order	Winner	Song	Loser	Lulu	Brown	Claudia	Daniel
Episode 5 (October 21, 2012)	Lulu	1	Marquinho Osócio	"Tudo Bem"	Nayra Costa	N/A	✔	✔	–
Episode 5 (October 21, 2012)	Brown	2	Rafah	"Coração Leviano"	Eloisa Olinto	–	N/A	–	–
Episode 5 (October 21, 2012)	Claudia	3	Ju Moraes	"Ive Brussel"	Karla da Silva	–	✔	N/A	–
Episode 5 (October 21, 2012)	Daniel	4	Fernando Cruz	"Canto de Ossanha"	Barbara Mendes	–	–	–	N/A
Episode 5 (October 21, 2012)	Lulu	5	Kesia Estácio	"Primavera"	Gustavo Fagundes	N/A	–	✔	–
Episode 5 (October 21, 2012)	Brown	6	Mira Callado	"Boa Sorte / Good Luck"	Junior Meirelles	–	N/A	–	✔
Episode 5 (October 21, 2012)	Claudia	7	Breno Lima	"Closer"	Paulo Loureiro	–	–	N/A	–
Episode 5 (October 21, 2012)	Daniel	8	Pedro Eduardo	"Volta pra Mim"	Thais Moreira	✔	–	–	N/A
Episode 6 (October 28, 2012)	Brown	1	Ellen Oléria	"Canto das Três Raças"	Maria Christina	✔	N/A	✔	–
Episode 6 (October 28, 2012)	Claudia	2	Grace Carvalho	"Ainda Lembro"	Vinny Brito	–	–	N/A	✔
Episode 6 (October 28, 2012)	Daniel	3	Danilo Dyba	"Um por Outro"	Natalie Mendes	–	–	–	N/A
Episode 6 (October 28, 2012)	Brown	4	Quesia Luz	"Killing Me Softly with His Song"	Sandra Honda	–	N/A	✔	–
Episode 6 (October 28, 2012)	Lulu	5	Greyce Schwendner	"Garganta"	Luciana Spedo	N/A	–	Team full	–
Episode 6 (October 28, 2012)	Lulu	6	Gabriel Levan	"Billie Jean"	Luiza Dreyer	N/A	–	Team full	–
Episode 6 (October 28, 2012)	Claudia	7	Ana Rafaela	"Billionaire / Famo$a"	Marianna Eis	–	–	Team full	–
Episode 6 (October 28, 2012)	Daniel	8	Carol Marques	"Rolling in the Deep"	Dani Montuori	–	✔	Team full	N/A
Episode 7 (November 4, 2012)	Lulu	1	Lorena Lessa	"Onde Você Mora"	Samantha Carpinelli	–	–	Team full	–
Episode 7 (November 4, 2012)	Daniel	2	Alma Thomas	"Fato Consumado"	Dani Morais	–	✔	Team full	–
Episode 7 (November 4, 2012)	Brown	3	Mayara Prado	"Long Live"	Bruno & Camila	–	Team full	Team full	–
Episode 7 (November 4, 2012)	Claudia	4	Bella Stone	"Your Song"	Priscylla Lisboa	–	Team full	Team full	✔
Episode 7 (November 4, 2012)	Lulu	5	Patricia Rezende	"A Cura"	Diego Azevedo	N/A	Team full	Team full	Team full
Episode 7 (November 4, 2012)	Daniel	6	Liah Soares	"Coisas Que Eu Sei"	Luana Mallet	✔	Team full	Team full	Team full
Episode 7 (November 4, 2012)	Brown	7	Ludmillah Anjos	"Não Enche"	Karol Cândido	Team full	Team full	Team full	Team full
Episode 7 (November 4, 2012)	Claudia	8	Thalita Pertuzatti	"João de Barro"	Juliana Gomes	Team full	Team full	Team full	Team full

== Live shows ==
Key

Artist was saved by public's vote
Artist was saved by his/her coach
Artist was eliminated

=== Week 1: Playoffs ===
Episode	Coach	Order	Artist	Song	Result
Episode 8 (November 11, 2012)
Episode 8 (November 11, 2012)	Lulu Santos	1	Thais Moreira	"Humilde Residência"	Eliminated
Episode 8 (November 11, 2012)	Lulu Santos	2	Kesia Estácio	"Listen"	Public's vote (42%)
Episode 8 (November 11, 2012)	Lulu Santos	3	Marquinho Osócio	"Gostava Tanto de Você"	Coach's choice
Episode 8 (November 11, 2012)	Claudia Leitte	4	Gustavo Fagundes	"Fast Car"	Coach's choice
Episode 8 (November 11, 2012)	Claudia Leitte	5	Ju Moraes	"Sá Marina"	Public's vote (51%)
Episode 8 (November 11, 2012)	Claudia Leitte	6	Breno Lima	"I Have Nothing"	Eliminated
Episode 8 (November 11, 2012)	Carlinhos Brown	7	Ellen Oléria	"Um Móbile no Furacão"	Public's vote (46%)
Episode 8 (November 11, 2012)	Carlinhos Brown	8	Mira Callado	"Simples Desejo"	Coach's choice
Episode 8 (November 11, 2012)	Carlinhos Brown	9	Karla da Silva	"Samba a Dois"	Eliminated
Episode 8 (November 11, 2012)	Daniel	10	Vinny Brito	"Se Eu Quiser Falar com Deus"	Eliminated
Episode 8 (November 11, 2012)	Daniel	11	Junior Meirelles	"Olhos Coloridos"	Public's vote (43%)
Episode 8 (November 11, 2012)	Daniel	12	Danilo Dyba	"Cor de Ouro"	Coach's choice

=== Week 2: Playoffs ===
Episode	Coach	Order	Artist	Song	Result
Episode 9 (November 18, 2012)
Episode 9 (November 18, 2012)	Claudia Leitte	1	Ana Rafaela	"Fidelity"	Public's vote (46%)
Episode 9 (November 18, 2012)	Claudia Leitte	2	Nayra Costa	"At Last"	Coach's choice
Episode 9 (November 18, 2012)	Claudia Leitte	3	Sandra Honda	"Metamorfose Ambulante" / "Cochise"	Eliminated
Episode 9 (November 18, 2012)	Daniel	4	Fernando Cruz	"Essa Tal Liberdade"	Eliminated
Episode 9 (November 18, 2012)	Daniel	5	Pedro Eduardo	"Você Mudou"	Coach's choice
Episode 9 (November 18, 2012)	Daniel	6	Carol Marques	"Let It Be"	Public's vote (43%)
Episode 9 (November 18, 2012)	Carlinhos Brown	7	Quesia Luz	"Ben"	Coach's choice
Episode 9 (November 18, 2012)	Carlinhos Brown	8	Rafah	"O Mundo é um Moinho"	Public's vote (44%)
Episode 9 (November 18, 2012)	Carlinhos Brown	9	Dani Montuori	"Black is Beautiful"	Eliminated
Episode 9 (November 18, 2012)	Lulu Santos	10	Gabriel Levan	"Garota Nacional"	Coach's choice
Episode 9 (November 18, 2012)	Lulu Santos	11	Greyce Schwendner	"Set Fire to the Rain"	Eliminated
Episode 9 (November 18, 2012)	Lulu Santos	12	Maria Christina	"Exagerado"	Public's vote (56%)

=== Week 3: Playoffs & Quarterfinals ===
Episode	Coach	Order	Artist	Song	Result
Episode 10 (November 25, 2012)
Episode 10 (November 25, 2012)	Daniel	1	Liah Soares	"Tempo Perdido"	Public's vote (50%)
Episode 10 (November 25, 2012)	Daniel	2	Priscylla Lisboa	"Domino"	Eliminated
Episode 10 (November 25, 2012)	Daniel	3	Alma Thomas	"Será Que é Amor?"	Coach's choice
Episode 10 (November 25, 2012)	Claudia Leitte	4	Bella Stone	"Olhos nos Olhos"	Coach's choice
Episode 10 (November 25, 2012)	Claudia Leitte	5	Grace Carvalho	"Deixa eu Dizer"	Eliminated
Episode 10 (November 25, 2012)	Claudia Leitte	6	Thalita Pertuzatti	"Falando Sério"	Public's vote (49%)
Episode 10 (November 25, 2012)	Lulu Santos	7	Patricia Rezende	"Um Dia, Um Adeus"	Public's vote (38%)
Episode 10 (November 25, 2012)	Lulu Santos	8	Lorena Lessa	"Eu Preciso Dizer Que Te Amo"	Coach's choice
Episode 10 (November 25, 2012)	Lulu Santos	9	Luana Mallet	"Overjoyed"	Eliminated
Episode 10 (November 25, 2012)	Carlinhos Brown	10	Ludmillah Anjos	"Soul de Verão"	Public's vote (43%)
Episode 10 (November 25, 2012)	Carlinhos Brown	11	Mayara Prado	"É o Amor"	Eliminated
Episode 10 (November 25, 2012)	Carlinhos Brown	12	Dani Morais	"Baianidade Nagô"	Coach's choice
Episode 11 (November 25, 2012)
Episode 11 (November 25, 2012)	Carlinhos Brown	1	Quesia Luz	"Fora da Lei"	Eliminated
Episode 11 (November 25, 2012)	Carlinhos Brown	2	Mira Callado	"Mania de Você"	Public's vote (54%)
Episode 11 (November 25, 2012)	Daniel	3	Junior Meirelles	"Sangrando"	Public's vote (55%)
Episode 11 (November 25, 2012)	Daniel	4	Carol Marques	"Proposta"	Eliminated
Episode 11 (November 25, 2012)	Lulu Santos	5	Marquinho Osócio	"The Greatest Love of All"	Public's vote (82%)
Episode 11 (November 25, 2012)	Lulu Santos	6	Gabriel Levan	"Hey Jude"	Eliminated
Episode 11 (November 25, 2012)	Claudia Leitte	7	Gustavo Fagundes	"Hoje Eu Quero Sair Só"	Eliminated
Episode 11 (November 25, 2012)	Claudia Leitte	8	Ana Rafaela	"Não Precisa Mudar"	Public's vote (60%)

=== Week 4: Quarterfinals ===
Episode	Coach	Order	Artist	Song	Result
Episode 12 (December 2, 2012)
Episode 12 (December 2, 2012)	Claudia Leitte	1	Nayra Costa	"Jeito Sexy (Shy Guy)"	Eliminated
Episode 12 (December 2, 2012)	Claudia Leitte	2	Thalita Pertuzatti	"Olha"	Coach's choice
Episode 12 (December 2, 2012)	Claudia Leitte	3	Bella Stone	"Feeling Good"	Eliminated
Episode 12 (December 2, 2012)	Claudia Leitte	4	Ju Moraes	"Se"	Public's vote (51%)
Episode 12 (December 2, 2012)	Carlinhos Brown	5	Ellen Oléria	"Maria Maria"	Public's vote (33%)
Episode 12 (December 2, 2012)	Carlinhos Brown	6	Rafah	"Todo Azul do Mar"	Eliminated
Episode 12 (December 2, 2012)	Carlinhos Brown	7	Ludmillah Anjos	"O Amor e o Poder (The Power of Love)"	Coach's choice
Episode 12 (December 2, 2012)	Carlinhos Brown	8	Dani Morais	"Ainda Bem"	Eliminated
Episode 12 (December 2, 2012)	Lulu Santos	9	Kesia Estácio	"Dias de Domingo"	Coach's choice
Episode 12 (December 2, 2012)	Lulu Santos	10	Maria Christina	"Me Adora"	Public's vote (41%)
Episode 12 (December 2, 2012)	Lulu Santos	11	Lorena Lessa	"Fullgás"	Eliminated
Episode 12 (December 2, 2012)	Lulu Santos	12	Patricia Rezende	"Oceano"	Eliminated
Episode 12 (December 2, 2012)	Daniel	13	Liah Soares	"Asa Branca"	Public's vote (44%)
Episode 12 (December 2, 2012)	Daniel	14	Danilo Dyba	"Casa"	Coach's choice
Episode 12 (December 2, 2012)	Daniel	15	Alma Thomas	"Ainda Bem"	Eliminated
Episode 12 (December 2, 2012)	Daniel	16	Pedro Eduardo	"É Isso Aí (The Blower's Daughter)"	Eliminated

=== Week 5: Semifinals ===
Episode	Coach	Order	Artist	Song	Result
Episode 13 (December 9, 2012)
Episode 13 (December 9, 2012)	Daniel	1	Danilo Dyba	"Romaria"	Coach's choice
Episode 13 (December 9, 2012)	Daniel	2	Junior Meirelles	"Lilás"	Eliminated
Episode 13 (December 9, 2012)	Daniel	3	Liah Soares	"Se Você Pensa"	Public's vote (48%)
Episode 13 (December 9, 2012)	Claudia Leitte	4	Thalita Pertuzatti	"Paciência"	Coach's choice
Episode 13 (December 9, 2012)	Claudia Leitte	5	Ana Rafaela	"Dona Cila"	Eliminated
Episode 13 (December 9, 2012)	Claudia Leitte	6	Ju Moraes	"Sorte"	Public's vote (44%)
Episode 13 (December 9, 2012)	Carlinhos Brown	7	Ellen Oléria	"Jack Soul Brasileiro"	Public's vote (42%)
Episode 13 (December 9, 2012)	Carlinhos Brown	8	Mira Callado	"Jesus Cristo"	Eliminated
Episode 13 (December 9, 2012)	Carlinhos Brown	9	Ludmillah Anjos	"Meu Corpo Quer Você"	Coach's choice
Episode 13 (December 9, 2012)	Lulu Santos	10	Marquinho Osócio	"A Lua e Eu"	Eliminated
Episode 13 (December 9, 2012)	Lulu Santos	11	Maria Christina	"Stereo"	Public's vote (51%)
Episode 13 (December 9, 2012)	Lulu Santos	12	Kesia Estácio	"Me Deixa"	Coach's choice

=== Week 6: Finals ===
Episode	Coach	Order	Artist	Song	Result
Episode 14 (December 16, 2012)
Episode 14 (December 16, 2012)	Lulu Santos	1	Maria Christina	"A Namorada"	Coach's choice
Episode 14 (December 16, 2012)	Lulu Santos	2	Kesia Estácio	"Sinais de Fogo"	Eliminated
Episode 14 (December 16, 2012)	Daniel	3	Danilo Dyba	"Te Vivo"	Eliminated
Episode 14 (December 16, 2012)	Daniel	4	Liah Soares	"Pra Ser Sincero"	Coach's choice
Episode 14 (December 16, 2012)	Claudia Leitte	5	Thalita Pertuzatti	"Quem de Nós Dois"	Eliminated
Episode 14 (December 16, 2012)	Claudia Leitte	6	Ju Moraes	"A Menina Dança"	Coach's choice
Episode 14 (December 16, 2012)	Carlinhos Brown	7	Ludmillah Anjos	"O Canto da Cidade"	Eliminated
Episode 14 (December 16, 2012)	Carlinhos Brown	8	Ellen Oléria	"Anunciação"	Coach's choice
Episode 14 (December 16, 2012)	Lulu Santos	1	Maria Christina	"Eu Comi a Madona"	Runner-up
Episode 14 (December 16, 2012)	Daniel	2	Liah Soares	"Tente Outra Vez"	Runner-up
Episode 14 (December 16, 2012)	Claudia Leitte	3	Ju Moraes	"Verdade"	Runner-up
Episode 14 (December 16, 2012)	Carlinhos Brown	4	Ellen Oléria	"Taj Mahal"	Winner (39%)

== Elimination chart ==
Key

- Team Lulu
- Team Brown
- Team Claudia
- Team Daniel

Results

- Winner
- Runner-up
- Saved by the public
- Saved by the coach
- Eliminated

Live shows' results
Artist	Week 1	Week 2	Week 3		Week 4	Week 5	Week 6	
Artist	Week 1	Week 2	Round 1	Round 2	Week 4	Week 5	Round 1	Round 2
Ellen Oléria	Safe				Safe	Safe	Safe	Winner
Ju Moraes	Safe				Safe	Safe	Safe	Runner-up
Liah Soares			Safe		Safe	Safe	Safe	Runner-up
Maria Christina		Safe			Safe	Safe	Safe	Runner-up
Danilo Dyba	Safe				Safe	Safe	Eliminated	Eliminated (week 6)
Kesia Estácio	Safe				Safe	Safe	Eliminated	Eliminated (week 6)
Ludmillah Anjos			Safe		Safe	Safe	Eliminated	Eliminated (week 6)
Thalita Pertuzatti			Safe		Safe	Safe	Eliminated	Eliminated (week 6)
Ana Rafaela		Safe		Safe		Eliminated	Eliminated (week 5)	
Junior Meirelles	Safe			Safe		Eliminated	Eliminated (week 5)	
Marquinho Osócio	Safe			Safe		Eliminated	Eliminated (week 5)	
Mira Callado	Safe			Safe		Eliminated	Eliminated (week 5)	
Alma Thomas			Safe		Eliminated	Eliminated (week 4)		
Bella Stone			Safe		Eliminated	Eliminated (week 4)		
Dani Morais			Safe		Eliminated	Eliminated (week 4)		
Lorena Lessa			Safe		Eliminated	Eliminated (week 4)		
Nayra Costa		Safe			Eliminated	Eliminated (week 4)		
Patricia Rezende			Safe		Eliminated	Eliminated (week 4)		
Pedro Eduardo		Safe			Eliminated	Eliminated (week 4)		
Rafah		Safe			Eliminated	Eliminated (week 4)		
Carol Marques		Safe		Eliminated	Eliminated (week 3)			
Gabriel Levan		Safe		Eliminated	Eliminated (week 3)			
Gustavo Fagundes	Safe			Eliminated	Eliminated (week 3)			
Quesia Luz		Safe		Eliminated	Eliminated (week 3)			
Grace Carvalho			Eliminated	Eliminated (week 3)				
Luana Mallet			Eliminated	Eliminated (week 3)				
Mayara Prado			Eliminated	Eliminated (week 3)				
Priscylla Lisboa			Eliminated	Eliminated (week 3)				
Dani Montuori		Eliminated	Eliminated (week 2)					
Fernando Cruz		Eliminated	Eliminated (week 2)					
Greyce Schwendner		Eliminated	Eliminated (week 2)					
Sandra Honda		Eliminated	Eliminated (week 2)					
Breno Lima	Eliminated	Eliminated (week 1)						
Karla da Silva	Eliminated	Eliminated (week 1)						
Thais Moreira	Eliminated	Eliminated (week 1)						
Vinny Brito	Eliminated	Eliminated (week 1)						

== Contestant appearances on other earlier shows ==
- Karol Cândido was a finalist on High School Musical: A Seleção.
- Thaís Moreira was a finalist on the first season of Ídolos (9th place).
- Dani Moraes was a finalist on the fourth season of Ídolos (5th place).
- Maria Christina was a finalist on the third season of Ídolos (3rd place).
- Ludmillah Anjos was a semi-finalist on the first season of Ídolos (Top 30).

== Ratings and reception ==
=== Brazilian ratings ===
All numbers are in points and provided by Kantar Ibope Media.

Episode	Title	Air date	Timeslot	SP viewers (in points)	Source
1	Blind Auditions 1	September 23, 2012	Sunday 2:30 p.m. (BRT)	15.5	
2	Blind Auditions 2	September 30, 2012	Sunday 2:30 p.m. (BRT)	16.0	
3	Blind Auditions 3	October 7, 2012	Sunday 2:30 p.m. (BRT)	13.0	
4	Blind Auditions 4	October 14, 2012	Sunday 2:30 p.m. (BRT)	17.0	
5	Battles 1	October 21, 2012	Sunday 2:30 p.m. (BRT)	15.0	
6	Battles 2	October 28, 2012	Sunday 3:30 p.m. (BRST)	14.0	
7	Battles 3	November 4, 2012	Sunday 3:30 p.m. (BRST)	16.0	
8	Live Playoffs 1	November 11, 2012	Sunday 3:30 p.m. (BRST)	16.0	
9	Live Playoffs 2	November 18, 2012	Sunday 3:30 p.m. (BRST)	16.0	
10	Live Playoffs 3	November 25, 2012	Sunday 12:30 p.m. (BRST)	12.0	
11	Quarterfinals 1	November 25, 2012	Sunday 4:00 p.m. (BRST)	17.0	
12	Quarterfinals 2	December 2, 2012	Sunday 3:30 p.m. (BRST)	12.0	
13	Semifinals	December 9, 2012	Sunday 4:30 p.m. (BRST)	12.0	
14	Finals	December 16, 2012	Sunday 4:30 p.m. (BRST)	14.0	

- In 2012, each point represents 60.000 households in São Paulo.
