= Ídolos Brazil season 4 =

Ídolos Brazil
- Season 4
- Hosted by: Rodrigo Faro
- Judges: Luiz Calainho; Paula Lima; Marco Camargo
- Winner: Saulo Roston
- Runner-up: Diego Moraes
- Finals venue: Teatro Bradesco

Release
- Original network: Record
- Original release: August 18 – December 16, 2009

Season chronology
- ← Previous; Season 3 Next → Season 5

Ídolos Brazil 4 (also known as Ídolos 2009) was the fourth season of Brazilian reality interactive talent show Ídolos (second aired on Record), which premiered August 18, 2009 with the season finale airing on December 16, 2009.

Rodrigo Faro returned as a host from last year and the judging panel again consists of Luiz Calainho, Paula Lima and Marco Camargo.

Saulo Roston won the competition with Diego Moraes as the first runner-up and Hellen Lyu finishing third.

== Early process ==
=== Regional auditions ===
Auditions were held in the following cities:

During this stage guest judges filled in a special fourth judging seat.

Episode Air Date	Audition City	Audition Date	Audition Venue	Guest Fourth Judge
Aug 18, 2009	Fortaleza	May 14, 2009	Paulo Sarasate Gymnasium	No Guest Judge
Aug 19, 2009	Fortaleza	May 14, 2009	Paulo Sarasate Gymnasium	No Guest Judge
Aug 25, 2009	São Paulo	May 21, 2009	Anhembi Sambadrome	No Guest Judge
Aug 26, 2009	Curitiba	April 25, 2009	Barigui Park	No Guest Judge
Sep 01, 2009	Curitiba	April 25, 2009	Barigui Park	No Guest Judge
Set 02, 2009	Belo Horizonte	May 3, 2009	Chevrolet Hall	No Guest Judge
Set 02, 2009	Rio de Janeiro	May 28, 2009	Fort Copacabana	Fernanda Abreu
Set 08, 2009	Rio de Janeiro	May 29, 2009	Fort Copacabana	Jon Secada
Set 09, 2009	Rio de Janeiro	May 30, 2009	Windsor Atlantica Hotel	No Guest Judge

== Theater Round ==
=== Chorus Line ===
The first day of Theater Week featured the eighty-six contestants from the auditions round. Divided into groups, the contestants go up on stage and individually sing a song a capella. Sixty-seven advanced.

=== Groups ===
The sixty-seven remaining contestants were divided in groups of four or three. They had to pick a song and sing accompanied by a soundtrack. Forty-eight advanced.

=== Solos ===
The forty-eight remaining contestants had to choose a music and singing accompanied by a band and can also play an instrument. The contestants were divided into three rooms: square, circle and triangle. The twelve contestants on the square room were eliminated, while the twelve contestants on the circle room advanced to the semifinals.

=== Final Cut ===
The twenty-four remaining contestants who were in the triangle room knew that had not been defined a unanimous verdict for them. In the end, the judges take the contestants in pairs and tell them if they made the final twenty-four.

== Semi-finals ==
The twenty-four semifinalists were split by gender into two groups. Each contestant would then sing in their respective group's night. The top six contestants from each group made it to the finals. The guys performed on September 29, 2009 and the girls on October 7, 2009, with results show on the following night.

== Finals ==
=== Finalists ===
Contestant	Age	Hometown	Audition Location	Voted Off
Saulo Roston	20	Presidente Epitácio	São Paulo	Winner
Diego Moraes	23	Santa Bárbara d'Oeste	São Paulo	Dec 16, 2009
Hellen Lyu	18	Teodoro Sampaio	Curitiba	Dec 09, 2009
Priscila Borges	26	São Vicente	São Paulo	Dec 02, 2009
Dani Morais	25	Pedra Azul	Belo Horizonte	Nov 25, 2009
Marcos Paulo	19	Manaus	São Paulo	Nov 18, 2009
Marcos Duarte	25	Santa Quitéria	Fortaleza	Nov 12, 2009
Júlio César	21	São Paulo	São Paulo	Nov 04, 2009
Taíssa de Araújo	24	Rio de Janeiro	Rio de Janeiro	Nov 04, 2009
Thaís Bonizzi	20	Barueri	São Paulo	Oct 28, 2009
Raquel Soares	23	Itaguaí	Rio de Janeiro	Oct 21, 2009
Evandro Elias	25	Rio de Janeiro	Rio de Janeiro	Oct 14, 2009

== Elimination chart ==
Legend
Did Not Perform	Female	Male	Top 24	Top 12	Winner

Safe	Safe First	Safe Last	Eliminated	Withdrew

Stage:		Semi-Finals		Finals									
Stage:		Top 24		Top 12	Top 11	Top 10	Top 9	Top 7	Top 6	Top 5	Top 4	Top 3	Top 2
Week:		9/30	10/7	10/14	10/21	10/28	11/4	11/12 (Note: Owing to a blackout that occurred in several Brazilian states, the November 10 performance show was replayed on Wednesday and the results show was postponed to November 12. Marcos Duarte withdrew from the competition during the live results show despite being declared safe. The bottom three were then all allowed to continue in the competition, and there was no elimination.)	11/18 (Note: Due to Marcos Duarte's withdrawal on November 12, this week's votes were added to last week's.)	11/25	12/2	12/9	12/16
Place	Contestant	Result											
1	Saulo Roston	Top 12	N/A	Safe	Safe	Safe	Bottom 3	Safe	Safe	Safe	Safe	Safe	Winner
2	Diego Moraes	Top 12	N/A	Safe	Safe	Safe	Safe	~~Bottom 3~~	Safe	Safe	Bottom 2	Safe	Runner-up
3	Hellen Lyu	N/A	Top 12	Safe	Safe	Safe	Safe	Safe	Safe	Bottom 3	Bottom 3	Elim	
4	Priscila Borges	N/A	Top 12	Safe	Safe	Safe	Safe	~~Bottom 3~~	Bottom 2	Bottom 2	Elim		
5	Dani Morais	N/A	Top 12	Safe	Safe	Bottom 3	Safe	~~Bottom 3~~	Bottom 3	Elim			
6	Marcos Paulo	Top 12	N/A	Safe	Bottom 3	Safe	Bottom 4	Safe	Elim				
7	Marcos Duarte	Top 12	N/A	Safe	Safe	Safe	Safe	WD					
8–9	Júlio César	Top 12	N/A	Safe	Bottom 2	Bottom 3	Elim						
8–9	Taíssa de Araújo	N/A	Top 12	Safe	Safe	Safe	Elim						
10	Thaís Bonizzi	N/A	Top 12	Bottom 2	Safe	Elim							
11	Raquel Soares	N/A	Top 12	Bottom 3	Elim								
12	Evandro Elias	Top 12	N/A	Elim									
Semi- Final 2	Aline Moreira	N/A	Elim										
Semi- Final 2	Bárbara Amorim	N/A	Elim										
Semi- Final 2	Mayara Magalhães	N/A	Elim										
Semi- Final 2	Melina Marçal	N/A	Elim										
Semi- Final 2	Natália Rodrigues	N/A	Elim										
Semi- Final 2	Suzi di Paula	N/A	Elim										
Semi- Final 1	Cosme Motta	Elim											
Semi- Final 1	Jésus Henrique	Elim											
Semi- Final 1	Juceir Júnio	Elim											
Semi- Final 1	Leonardo Baptista	Elim											
Semi- Final 1	Maycon Balbino	Elim											
Semi- Final 1	Phelipe Carvalho	Elim											

== Results Night Performances ==
Week	Performer(s)	Title	Performance Type
Top 10	Diogo Nogueira	"Tô Fazendo a Minha"	live performance
Top 7	Paulo Ricardo	"Olhar 43"	live performance
Top 6	Wando	"Moça"	live performance
Top 5	Fresno	"Tô Fazendo a Minha"	live performance
Top 3	Billy Paul	"Your Song"	live performance
Top 2 Finale	Maria Rita	"Homem Falou"	live performance
Top 2 Finale	Davi Metal & Andreas Kisser	"Meu Ursinho"	live performance
Top 2 Finale	Maria Rita	"A Festa"	live performance
Top 2 Finale	Alexandre Pires	"Sá Marina"	live performance
Top 2 Finale	Alexandre Pires	"Cigano"	live performance
