= Saulo Roston =

Brazilian singer-songwriter (born 1989)

- Born: Saulo do Amaral Oliveira Souza; March 22, 1989 (age 37); Presidente Epitácio, Brazil
- Genres: Pop, R&B, soul
- Occupations: Singer, songwriter
- Years active: 2009–present
- Label: Warner Music Brasil
- Website: www.sauloroston.com.br

Saulo do Amaral Freire Oliveira Souza (born March 22, 1989), best known as Saulo Roston, is a Brazilian pop singer and songwriter. He rose to fame after winning the fourth season of the reality television show Ídolos Brazil.

== Biography ==
Saulo was born in 1989 in Presidente Epitácio, São Paulo. He began singing at age 12, and at 13, did a concert for 4000 people. With the constant support of parents, Roston did a few months of singing lesson in São Paulo. He studied guitar and also a bit of piano.

At age 15, he moved to Goiânia, Goiás and kept singing in bars. At 17, he moved to Malaysia to do an exchange program with his local Rotary club. After a rough year, he returned to Brazil in early 2007, where he spent some downtime in his home city. Saulo had huge ambitions and decided to try out for Ídolos Brazil third season, however was eliminated in the Top 30. Saulo did not give up, returned to the show and ranked prominently in the fourth season, beginning his unpredictable rise to stardom.

== Ídolos Brazil ==
=== Overview ===
Roston first auditioned for the third season of Ídolos Brazil when he made all the way to the Top 30, but was cut prior to the Top 10. A year later, he auditioned again, this time for the fourth season. Both his auditions took place in São Paulo, São Paulo.

=== Performances ===
Week #	Theme	Song Choice	Original Artist	Order #	Result
Audition	Auditioner's Choice	"Bem Que Se Quis"	Marisa Monte	N/A	Advanced
Theater	First Solo	Quando Chove	Patricia Marx	N/A	Advanced
Top 24	Top 12 Men	"Como Vai Você"	Roberto Carlos	7	Advanced
Top 12	Sing Your Idol	"Beija Eu"	Marisa Monte	4	Safe
Top 11	70s Night	"Mania de Você"	Rita Lee	10	Safe
Top 10	The Roguish	"Já Tive Mulheres"	Martinho da Vila	6	Safe
Top 9	Broken Heart Songs	"Tem Que Ser Você"	Victor & Léo	4	Bottom 3
Top 7	80s Night	"Você é Linda"	Caetano Veloso	2	Safe
Top 6	Cult Trash	"Aguenta Coração"	José Augusto	1	Safe
Top 5	Kings of the Pop	"Amor I Love You"	Marisa Monte	4	Safe
Top 5	Kings of the Pop	"Your Song"	Elton John	9	Safe
Top 4	Dedicate A Song	"Monalisa"	Jorge Vercilo	1	Safe
Top 4	My Soundtrack	"Eu Sei Que Vou Te Amar"	Tom Jobim	5	Safe
Top 3	Judge's Choice	"Pro Dia Nascer Feliz"	Cazuza	1	Safe
Top 3	Judge's Choice	"Fácil"	Jota Quest	4	Safe
Top 3	Judge's Choice	"O Portão"	Roberto Carlos	7	Safe
Top 2	Winner's Single No. 1	"Nova Paixão"	Saulo Roston	1	Winner
Top 2	Best of the Season	"Your Song"	Elton John	3	Winner
Top 2	Winner's Single No. 2	"Entre o Ontem e o Amanhã"	Saulo Roston	5	Winner

== Career ==
Roston signed a recording contract with Warner Music Brasil, managed by Rede Record in December 2009.

=== Nova Paixão ===
Studio recording sessions for the eponymous major label debut Saulo Roston ran in São Paulo, São Paulo, early 2010. Saulo Roston: Nova Paixão was released on March 25, 2010, in Brazil, with the song "Nova Paixão" (English: New Passion) as first single.

==== Music video ====
The music video was directed by actor Alexandre Frota. Filming started on March 12, 2010, on Rio de Janeiro, Rio de Janeiro. All the action takes place in a futuristic flat, mounted in the Rede Record's studios. Actress Karen Junqueira play the role of Saulo's love interrese. The video premiered on March 25, 2010.

Preceded by Pensando em Você	Ídolos winner's singles Nova Paixão (2009)	Succeeded by Sem Juízo

=== Discography ===
- Saulo Roston: Nova Paixão (2010)

Preceded by Rafael Barreto	Ídolos Brazil winner 2009	Succeeded by Israel Lucero
