= José Augusto =

José Augusto may refer to:

- José Augusto (footballer) (born 1937), Portuguese footballer
- José Augusto (musician) (born 1953), Brazilian musician
- José Augusto, a RENAMO leader and negotiator at the Rome General Peace Accords
