= Rafael Barreto (singer) =

Brazilian singer-songwriter (born 1985)

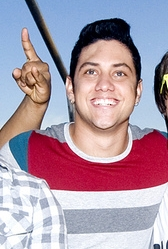
- Rafael Barreto

Background information
- Born: Rafael Rodrigues Barreto; October 21, 1985 (age 40)
- Origin: Salvador, Brazil
- Genres: Pop music
- Occupations: Singer, songwriter
- Years active: 2008–present
- Label: Sony Music Entertainment

Rafael Rodrigues Barreto (born October 21, 1985), best known as Rafael Barreto, is a Brazilian pop singer and songwriter. He rose to fame after winning the third season of the reality television show Ídolos Brazil.

== Biography ==
Rafael Barreto was born on October 21, 1985, in Salvador, Bahia, Brazil. He has been singing since age 13 and began composing at 16.

Barreto became motherless in 2006, his father left home and gave no further news. Then, he had a brain aneurysm at the end of 2007 and receive a full support from his brother, Edu Barreto and his girlfriend Deya.

Rafael's musical inspirations include Michael Jackson, Marvin Gaye, LS Jack, Skank, Ana Carolina, Jota Quest, Djavan and Lulu Santos.

== Ídolos Brazil ==
=== Overview ===
Barreto auditioned for the third season of Ídolos Brazil in Salvador, Bahia.

=== Performances ===
| Week # | Theme | Song Choice | Original Artist | Order # | Result |
|---|---|---|---|---|---|
| Audition | Auditioner's Choice | "Quando Chove" | Patricia Marx | N/A | Advanced |
| Theater | First Solo | Você Chegou | LS Jack | N/A | Advanced |
| Top 30 | Semi-final/Group 2 | "Uma Carta" | LS Jack | 9 | Advanced |
| Top 10 | My Idol | "Pra Rua Me Levar" | Ana Carolina | 6 | Safe |
| Top 9 | Female Singers | "Nada Por Mim" | Leila Pinheiro | 8 | Safe |
| Top 8 | Love Songs | "Anjo" | Roupa Nova | 4 | Safe |
| Top 7 | Country Pop | "Como Um Anjo" | César Menotti & Fabiano | 7 | Bottom 2 |
| Top 6 | Samba | "Tarde em Itapuã" | Vinicius de Moraes / Toquinho | 5 | Safe |
| Top 5 | Birth Year Songs | "Olhar 43" | RPM | 5 | Safe |
| Top 5 | Birth Year Songs | "Dona" | Roupa Nova | 10 | Safe |
| Top 4 | Roberto Carlos & Elis Regina | "É Preciso Saber Viver" | Roberto Carlos | 2 | Safe |
| Top 4 | Roberto Carlos & Elis Regina | "Romaria" | Elis Regina | 6 | Safe |
| Top 3 | Jovem Pan; Number 1 Hits | "O Sol" | Jota Quest | 2 | Safe |
| Top 3 | Jovem Pan; Number 1 Hits | "Tem Que Ser Você" | Victor & Leo | 5 | Safe |
| Top 3 | Jovem Pan; Number 1 Hits | "Por Mais Que Eu Tente" | Marjorie Estiano | 8 | Safe |
| Top 2 | Winner's Single No. 1 | "Ficou No Ar" | Rafael Barreto | 2 | Winner |
| Top 2 | Contestant's Choice | "You'll Be in My Heart" | Phil Collins / Ed Motta | 4 | Winner |
| Top 2 | Winner's Single No. 2 | "Não Vou Duvidar" | Rafael Barreto | 6 | Winner |

== Career ==
Barreto signed a recording contract with Sony Music Entertainment, managed by Rede Record in December 2008.

=== Pensando em Você ===
Studio recording sessions for the eponymous major label debut Rafael Barreto ran in São Paulo, São Paulo early 2009. Rafael Barreto: Pensando em Você was released in June 2009 in Brazil, with the song "Pensando em Você" (English: Thinking of You) as first single.

In a break with Ídolos tradition, Barreto's Ídolos "coronation song", "Não Vou Duvidar" (English: I Don't Doubt), despite being included on his major-label debut, wasn't released as a single, becoming the first Ídolos winner album to do so.

==== Music video ====
Filming of Rafael Barreto's first music video started between May and June 2009 in São Paulo, São Paulo. The video premiered on June 26, 2009.

| Preceded by Rotina | Ídolos winner's singles Pensando em Você (2008) | Succeeded by Nova Paixão |

=== Discography ===
- Rafael Barreto: Pensando em Você (2009)

| Preceded by Thaeme Mariôto | Ídolos Brazil winner 2008 | Succeeded by Saulo Roston |
