= Silueta =

Silueta may refer to:

- Silueta (wrestler)
- Silueta (album), album by Ana Gabriel
