= Ellen Oléria =

Brazilian singer (born 1982)

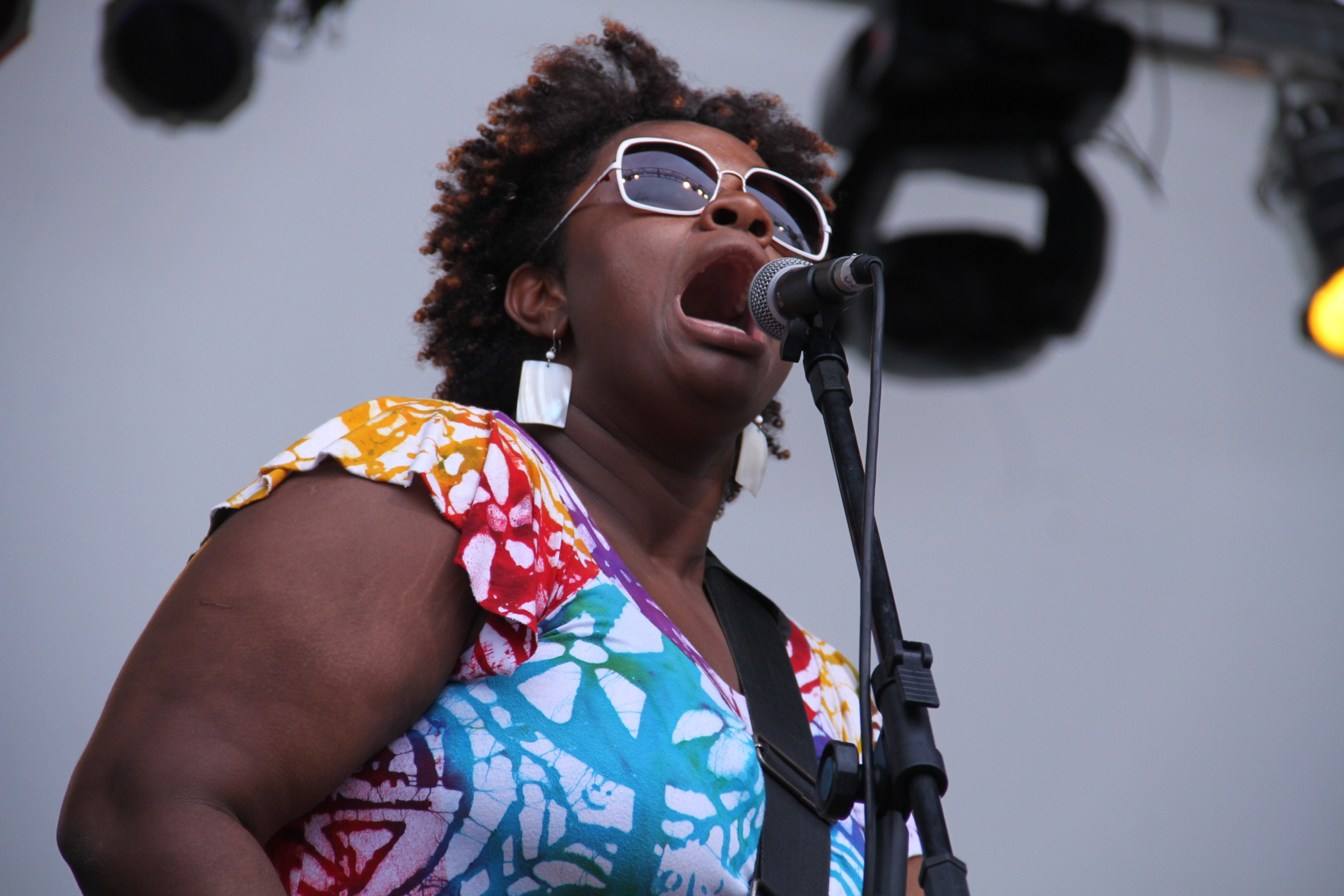
- Ellen at Contact Festival, 2011.

Background information
- Born: Ellen Gomes de Oléria; 12 November 1982 (age 43); Brasília, DF, Brazil
- Genres: MPB, funk, samba, soul, bossa nova, hip hop
- Occupations: Composer, actress
- Years active: 1998–present
- Labels: Carne Dura Produções; Universal Music Group Universal Music Group
- Website: ellenoleria.com.br

Ellen Gomes de Oléria, known as Ellen Oléria (born 12 November 1982) is a Brazilian singer, musician, songwriter, and actress.

== Life and career ==
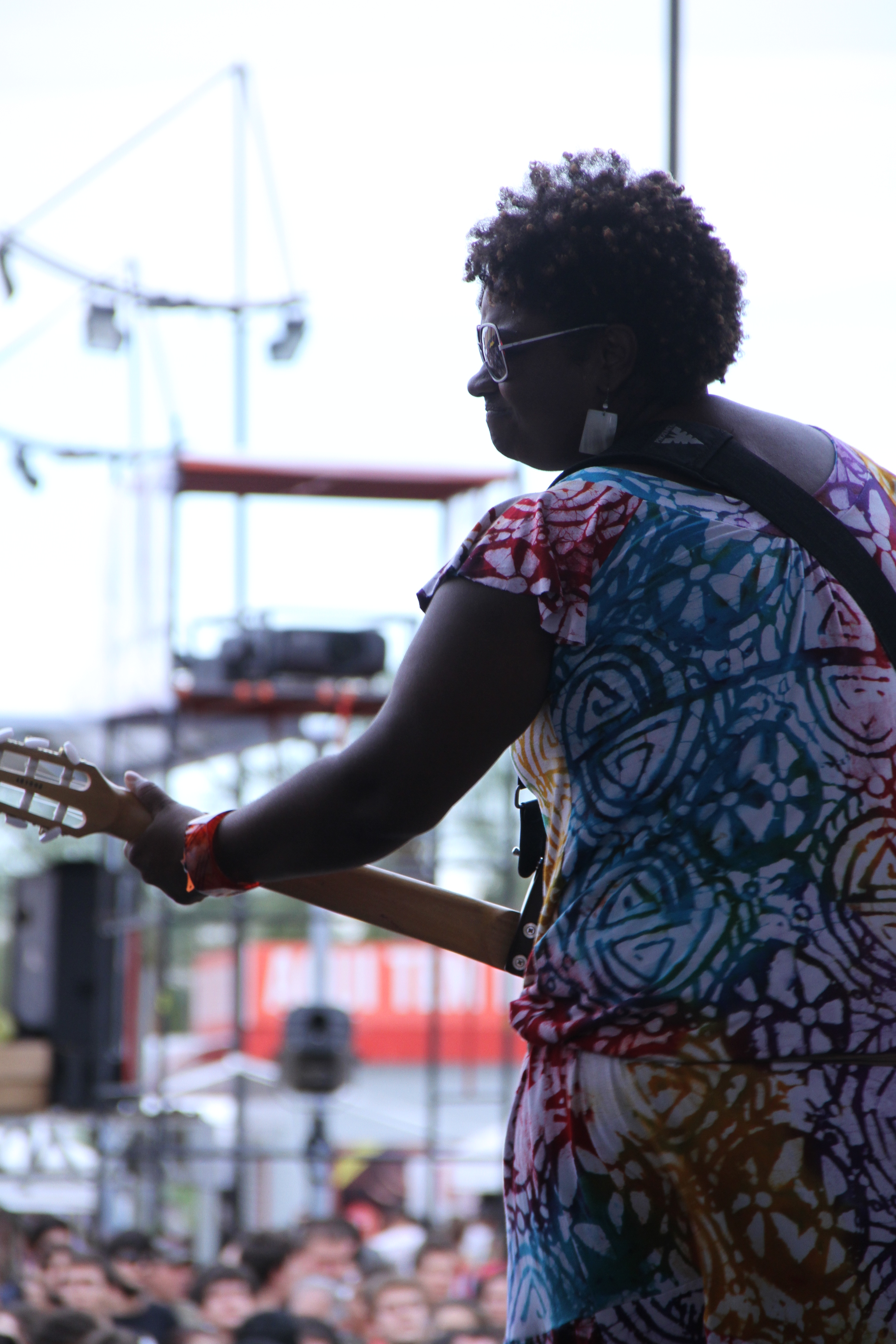
Ellen at Contact Festival, 2011.

Ellen was born in Brasília, Distrito Federal and was raised in Chaparral, a region of Taguatinga. Initially more interested in instruments, she began to sing in church choirs, by her parents influence. She started her musical career at sixteen. As an actress, she graduated in Performing Arts from the University of Brasília, in 2007.

Ellen mixes bossa nova, funk, hip hop, Música popular brasileira, samba, soul and poetry in letters and songs of her own. She opened for and participated in shows of Lenine, Paulinho Moska, Chico César, Ney Matogrosso, Margareth Menezes, Milton Nascimento, and Sandra de Sá (with whom she shared the stage in the celebrations of the 50th anniversary of Brasília).

She participated in the commemorative DVD of 25 career of GOG, "Cartão Postal Bomba!", and the album "Aviso às Gerações" in the song "Carta à Mãe África". She also participated in the CD "Tomo Um do Oráculo Universal das Constantes Inconstâncias Pessoais do Pessoal" from Radio Casual.

On 12 August 2013, she married Poliana Martins, in Brasília.

I sing the universe of a black woman, lesbian, raised in Chaparral, a region between Taguatinga and Ceilândia.

=== Pret.utu ===
Since 2005 Ellen Oléria often presents with band Pret.utu, with the following members: Pedro Martins (guitarist and classical guitarist), Paula Zimbres (bass guitarist), Célio Maciel (drummer), Pedro Martins (guitarist), Felipe Viegas (keyboardist) e Léo Barbosa (percussionist).

=== Banda Soatá ===
Ellen Oléria participates as well in the Banda Soatá, a bond of alternative rock e carimbo founded in 2007, with members from Federal District and Pará from band Epadu. Besides Ellen, they have Jonas Santos (composer e guitarist), Riti Santiago (drummer), Dido Mariano (bassist) e Lieber Rodrigues (percussionist).

=== The Voice Brasil ===
Ellen was the winner of the first season of the reality show The Voice Brasil of Rede Globo. She won a prize of 500,000 reais, a contract with Universal Music, career management, a car, and was one of the main attractions at the réveillon celebrations of Copacabana, Rio de Janeiro in 2012.

==== Performances on The Voice ====
Show	Song	Original Artist	Order	Result
Blind Audition	"Zumbi"	Jorge Ben Jor	6	All 4 chairs turned Oléria joined Brown's Team
Battle Round	"Canto das Três Raças" (vs. Maria Christina)	Clara Nunes	1	Advanced; Saved by coach
Live Playoffs 1	"Um Móbile no Furacão"	Paulinho Moska	7	Advanced; 46% to save
Quarter-finals 2	"Maria Maria"	Milton Nascimento	5	Advanced; 33% to save
Semi-finals	"Jack Soul Brasileiro"	Lenine	7	Advanced; 42% to save
Finals	"Anunciação"	Alceu Valença	8	Advanced; Saved by coach
Finals	"Taj Mahal"	Jorge Ben Jor	12	Winner; 39% to win

== Discography ==
=== Albums ===
- 2009 – Peça
- 2011 – Ellen Oléria e Pret.utu – Ao Vivo no Garagem
- 2013 – Ellen Oléria
- 2016 – Afrofuturista

Awards and achievements
Preceded by N/A	The Voice Brasil Winner; 2012	Succeeded by Sam Alves
