= Santa Quitéria, Ceará =

Municipality in Ceará, Brazil

Santa Quitéria
- Municipality
- The Municipality of Santa Quitéria
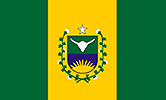
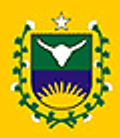
- Flag Coat of arms
- Nickname: "Terra das minas de urânio" ("Land of the Uranium Mines")
- Location of Santa Quitéria in the State of Ceará
- Coordinates: 04°20′11″S 40°09′13″W
- Country: Brazil
- Region: Northeast
- State: Ceará
- Founded: December 17, 1987

Government
  - Mayor: Joel Barroso (PSB)

Area
  - Total: 4,260.681 km^{2} (1,645.058 sq mi)
- Elevation: 60.26 m (197.71 ft)

Population (2020)
  - Total: 43,711
  - Density: 10.259/km^{2} (26.571/sq mi)
- Time zone: UTC−3 (BRT)
- HDI (2000): 0.642 – medium
- Website: www.santaquiteria.ce.gov.br/

Santa Quitéria is a municipality in the central area of the state of Ceará, Brazil. Its history goes back to the 18th century, when the farmer João Pinto de Mesquita settled in the area.

The former farm Cascavel was elevated to the condition of vila on August 27, 1856, under the name of Santa Quitéria. Only on December 20, 1938, was Santa Quitéria elevated to the category of city.

It is the largest municipality of Ceará in terms of area.
