= Santa Cecília =

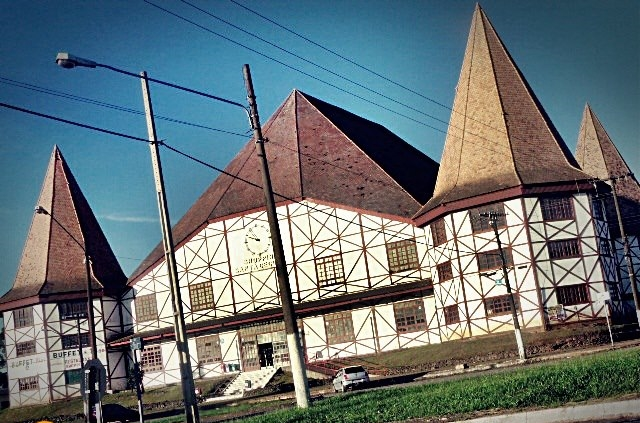

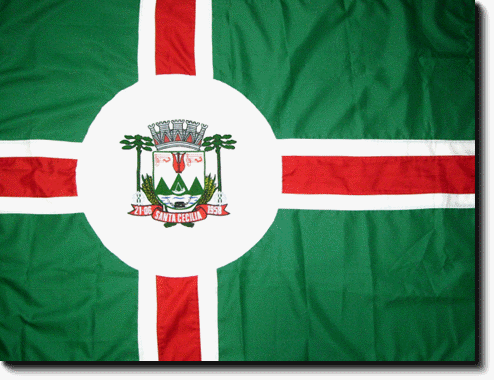
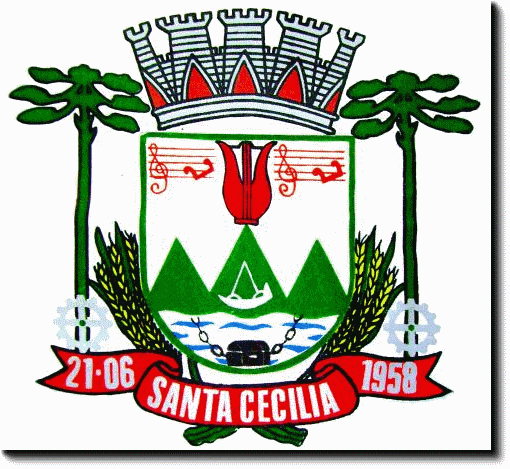
- Flag Coat of arms

- Location of Zortéa

- Location within Brazil
- Coordinates: 26°57′39″S 50°25′37″W
- Country: Brazil
- Region: South
- State: (Santa Catarina (state)) Santa Catarina
- Founded: June 21, 1958

Government
  - Mayor: Alessandra Garcia

Area
  - Total: 1,145.321 km^{2} (442.211 sq mi)
- Elevation: 1,100 m (3,600 ft)

Population (2020)
  - Total: 16,918
  - Density: 14.3/km^{2} (37/sq mi)
- Time zone: UTC-3 (UTC-3)
  - Summer (DST): UTC-2 (UTC-2)
- HDI (2000): 0.746
- Website: www.santacecilia.sc.gov.br

Santa Cecília is a city in Santa Catarina, in the Southern Region of Brazil. The municipality was created in 1958 out of the existing municipality of Curitibanos.
