= Tucunduva =

Municipality of Rio Grande do Sul, Brazil

- Municipality
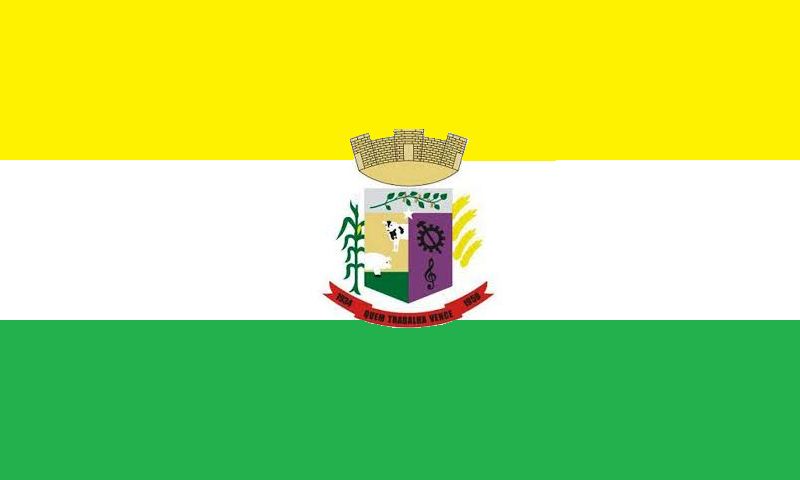
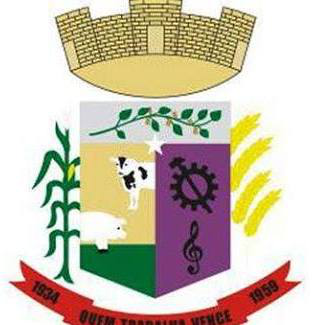
- Flag Coat of arms
- Motto: "Quem trabalha vence"
- Location of Tucunduva in Rio Grande do Sul
- Country: Brazil
- Region: South
- State: Rio Grande do Sul
- Mesoregion: Noroeste Rio-Grandense
- Microregion: Santa Rosa
- Founded: 10 September 1959

Government
  - Mayor: Jonas Fernando (PDT, 2021 - 2024)

Area
  - Total: 181.198 km^{2} (69.961 sq mi)

Population (2020)
  - Total: 5,612
  - Density: 30.97/km^{2} (80.22/sq mi)
- Demonym: Tucunduvense
- Time zone: UTC−3 (BRT)
- Website: Official website

Tucunduva is a municipality in the state of Rio Grande do Sul, Brazil. Known as the Capital of Mechanized Crops, Tucunduva has the highest grain yield per hectare in Brazil and is also known as the Land of Musicians.

== Etymology ==
The etymological roots of the name "Tucunduva" are difficult to reach. Some stories say that João Tucunduva was the first resident of the place. His father was called Captain Carvalho Rodrigues Tucunduva and his uncle was Colonel José Rodrigues Tucunduva. Coming from the province of São Paulo, current state of Paraná, where there were forests of small palm trees named in the Guarani language of Tucun and its collective of Uva. This made them come to be known as Rodrigues brothers from the Tucun da Uva lands and it was in his honor that the municipality was renamed Tucunduva.

== History ==
The Municipality of Tucunduva was effectively colonized from 1920 by colonists of Italian origin, from the municipality of Bento Gonçalves which was part of the Old Colonies (first colonies of immigrants in the state of Rio Grande do Sul), and also colonists of Germanic origin from Germany, Erechim and from the Guarani Colony.

The main causes of the immigration of settlers to Tucunduva were:

- In the municipalities where the colonizers came from, the land was shredded and depleted due to the high number of families;
- The railroad that was built in Bento Gonçalves caused a lot of damage and cut the land more;
- The installation of the Land and Colonization Commission in Santa Rosa, which was in charge of Colonization in the region. Contributed to this achievement;
- The lands, in Tucunduva, were fertile and flat and had low prices and good payment conditions.

When the colonizers arrived in Tucunduva they found some families occupying land, which were dispersed and without much organization. In 1926, the Tucunduva settlement was founded. In 1931, the municipality of Santa Rosa was emancipated and the town of Tucunduva became a village and, in 1934, it was elevated to the 7th District of the municipality of Santa Rosa. The municipality of Tucunduva was created on September 10, 1959 through state law number 3,821 / 1959 and this law was published in the Official Gazette on September 11, 1959.

Tucunduva's first legislature consisted of seven councilors elected by the people. The first mayor, sworn in on December 31, 1959, was Mr. Florentino Rossato, with Mr. Erminio Carlos Schwerz as vice-mayor. Since 1967, Tucunduva, being a municipality bordering the Argentine Republic, became part of the municipalities in the area of national security and the mayors were appointed by the President of the Republic. Its area was 396 km^{2}. In 1992, with the emancipation of Novo Machado, the area became 173.33 km^{2}. Also, Tucunduva stopped making limits with the Argentine Republic. The municipality of Tucunduva is located in the Northwest Region of the State of Rio Grande do Sul, 225 mi from the state capital, Porto Alegre. It has a population of approximately 5,988 inhabitants. Tucunduva borders the cities of Horizontina, Novo Machado, Tuparendi, Três de Maio, Santa Rosa, and Dr. Mauricio Cardoso.

According to 2004 data, the municipality has 4,598 voters, 2,217 of whom are male and 2,381 female.

Agriculture is its main source of resources and there is a concern with the creation of new sources of income in the primary sector, causing a great deal of technical and veterinary assistance by the City Hall and cooperatives, aiming at productivity bigger and better quality. The activity of dairy cattle farming occupies a prominent place in rural properties, as well as pig farming.

In the environment, a partnership between the City Hall, the Public Ministry and riverside rural producers, is taking place to recover the riparian forest of the Santa Rosa and Pratos rivers, aiming at the conservation of the springs of the Municipality, guaranteeing the quality and quantity of water for human and animal consumption. In rural properties, there is guidance, monitoring and incentives for the execution and implementation of septic tanks and the proper destination of animal and human waste with the aim of reducing soil and water contamination and also the polluting potential.

== Geography ==
It is located at latitude 27°39'25" south and at longitude 54°26'25" west, at an altitude of 223 meters. It has an area of 175.96 km^{2}. Its estimated population in 2020 was 5,644 inhabitants.

== See also ==
- List of municipalities in Rio Grande do Sul
- Route Yucumã
- Uruguay River Route
- Missões Region
