= Ídolos Brazil season 3 =

Ídolos Brazil
- Season 3
- Hosted by: Rodrigo Faro
- Judges: Luiz Calainho; Paula Lima; Marco Camargo
- Winner: Rafael Barreto
- Runner-up: Rafael Bernardo
- Finals venue: Arena Skol Anhembi

Release
- Original network: Record
- Original release: August 19 – December 17, 2008

Season chronology
- ← Previous; Season 2 Next → Season 4

Ídolos Brazil 3 (known as Ídolos 2008) was the third season of Brazilian reality interactive talent show Ídolos (and first aired on Record), which premiered August 19, 2008 with the season finale airing on December 17, 2008.

Rodrigo Faro was the host and the judging panel was reduced from 4 (in seasons 1 and 2) to 3 and consisted of Luiz Calainho, a music and entertainment businessman, Paula Lima, a soul singer/songwriter and Marco Camargo, a Latin Grammy Award winning music producer.

Rafael Barreto won the competition with Rafael Bernardo as the first runner-up and Maria Christina finishing third.

== Early Process ==
=== Regional Auditions ===
Auditions were held in the following cities:

| Episodes Air Dates | Audition City | Audition Date | Audition Venue |
|---|---|---|---|
| August 19, 2008 to September 10, 2008 | Porto Alegre | May 3, 2008 | Hotel De Ville |
| August 19, 2008 to September 10, 2008 | Salvador | May 17, 2008 | Hotel Bahia Othon Palace |
| August 19, 2008 to September 10, 2008 | Rio de Janeiro | May 24, 2008 | Sambadrome Marquês de Sapucaí |
| August 19, 2008 to September 10, 2008 | São Paulo | May 31, 2008 | Ibirapuera Gymnasium |

== Theater Round ==
=== Groups ===
The first day of Theater Week featured the eighty-nine contestants from the auditions round. Divided into groups, each contestant should go on stage and sing a song a capella for the judges until they stopped them. Seventy contestants advanced.

=== Duets ===
The next round required the contestants to split up in pairs and perform. Forty-five advanced to the final round of Theater requiring a solo performance.

=== Solos ===
Forty-five made it to the final round, which required the contestants singing solo with the option of playing an instrument. In the end, the judges take the contestants in groups of five and tell them if they made the final thirty.

== Semi-finals ==
The thirty semifinalists were randomly split into different groups. Each contestant would then sing in their respective group's night. There were three separate groups and the top three contestants from each group made it to the finals.

=== Wild Card ===
Six contestants who failed to make it to the finals were invited back to perform for another chance at a spot in the finals. Only one wildcard contestant (Nanda Garcia) was chosen by the public vote.

== Finals ==
=== Finalists ===
| Contestant | Age | Hometown | Audition Location | Voted Off |
|---|---|---|---|---|
| Rafael Barreto | 22 | Salvador | Salvador | Winner |
| Rafael Bernardo | 23 | Vitória da Conquista | São Paulo | Dec 17, 2008 |
| Maria Christina | 19 | São Bernardo do Campo | São Paulo | Dec 10, 2008 |
| Paulo Cremona | 23 | São Paulo | São Paulo | Dec 03, 2008 |
| Nanda Garcia | 23 | Niterói | Rio de Janeiro | Nov 26, 2008 |
| Lorena Chaves | 21 | Belo Horizonte | São Paulo | Nov 19, 2008 |
| Cássia Raquel | 21 | Rio de Janeiro | Rio de Janeiro | Nov 12, 2008 |
| Amandí Cortez | 26 | João Pessoa | Salvador | Nov 05, 2008 |
| Pedrinho Black | 23 | Uberlândia | São Paulo | Oct 29, 2008 |
| Tiago Mattos | 18 | Curitiba | Porto Alegre | Oct 22, 2008 |

== Elimination chart ==
Legend
| Did Not Perform | Female | Male | Top 30 | Top 10 | Winner |

| Safe | Safe First | Safe Last | Eliminated |

| Stage: | | Semi-Finals | | | WC | Finals | | | | | | | | |
| Stage: | | Top 30 | | | WC | Top 10 | Top 9 | Top 8 | Top 7 | Top 6 | Top 5 | Top 4 | Top 3 | Top 2 |
| Week: | | 9/23 | 10/1 | 10/8 | 10/15 | 10/22 | 10/29 | 11/5 | 11/12 | 11/19 | 11/26 | 12/3 | 12/10 | 12/17 |
| Place | Contestant | Result | | | | | | | | | | | | |
| 1 | Rafael Barreto | N/A | Top 10 | N/A | N/A | Safe | Safe | Safe | Bottom 2 | Safe | Safe | Safe | Safe | Winner |
| 2 | Rafael Bernardo | Top 10 | N/A | N/A | N/A | Safe | Bottom 2 | Safe | Safe | Safe | Bottom 2 | Safe | Safe | Runner-up |
| 3 | Maria Christina | N/A | Top 10 | N/A | N/A | Safe | Safe | Safe | Bottom 3 | Safe | Safe | Bottom 2 | Elim | |
| 4 | Paulo Cremona | N/A | N/A | Top 10 | N/A | Safe | Safe | Safe | Safe | Bottom 3 | Safe | Elim | | |
| 5 | Nanda Garcia | N/A | N/A | Elim | Top 10 | Safe | Safe | Bottom 2 | Safe | Bottom 2 | Elim | | | |
| 6 | Lorena Chaves | Top 10 | N/A | N/A | N/A | Bottom 3 | Bottom 3 | Safe | Safe | Elim | | | | |
| 7 | Cássia Raquel | N/A | N/A | Top 10 | N/A | Safe | Safe | Bottom 3 | Elim | | | | | |
| 8 | Amandí Cortez | N/A | Top 10 | N/A | N/A | Bottom 2 | Safe | Elim | | | | | | |
| 9 | Pedrinho Black | Top 10 | N/A | N/A | N/A | Safe | Elim | | | | | | | |
| 10 | Tiago Mattos | N/A | N/A | Top 10 | N/A | Elim | | | | | | | | |
| Wild; Card | Geisi Rios | Elim | N/A | N/A | Elim | | | | | | | | | |
| Wild; Card | Grazzi Brasil | N/A | N/A | Elim | Elim | | | | | | | | | |
| Wild; Card | Mariana Bravo | N/A | Elim | N/A | Elim | | | | | | | | | |
| Wild; Card | Rubens Daniel | N/A | Elim | N/A | Elim | | | | | | | | | |
| Wild; Card | Sarah Raquel | Elim | N/A | N/A | Elim | | | | | | | | | |
| Semi- Final 3 | Bruna Caiala | N/A | N/A | Elim | | | | | | | | | | |
| Semi- Final 3 | Daniela Ismério | N/A | N/A | Elim | | | | | | | | | | |
| Semi- Final 3 | Dyggo de Deus | N/A | N/A | Elim | | | | | | | | | | |
| Semi- Final 3 | Eduardo Louzada | N/A | N/A | Elim | | | | | | | | | | |
| Semi- Final 3 | Saulo do Amaral | N/A | N/A | Elim | | | | | | | | | | |
| Semi- Final 2 | Helen Cristina | N/A | Elim | | | | | | | | | | | |
| Semi- Final 2 | João Paulo Xavier | N/A | Elim | | | | | | | | | | | |
| Semi- Final 2 | Larissa Carvalho | N/A | Elim | | | | | | | | | | | |
| Semi- Final 2 | Leila Lins | N/A | Elim | | | | | | | | | | | |
| Semi- Final 2 | Renata Bacal | N/A | Elim | | | | | | | | | | | |
| Semi- Final 1 | Allan Lopes | Elim | | | | | | | | | | | | |
| Semi- Final 1 | João Klaus | Elim | | | | | | | | | | | | |
| Semi- Final 1 | Maiquel Zafanelli | Elim | | | | | | | | | | | | |
| Semi- Final 1 | Ricardo Fé | Elim | | | | | | | | | | | | |
| Semi- Final 1 | Thaís Barja | Elim | | | | | | | | | | | | |
