= LS Jack =

- Origin: Rio de Janeiro, Rio de Janeiro, Brazil
- Genres: Rock; pop rock
- Years active: 1997–2004, 2020–present
- Labels: Independent
- Members: Sérgio Ferreira; Vitor Queiroz; Bicudo
- Past members: Marcus Menna; Sérgio Morel; Alessandro Barros; Vinny

LS Jack is a Brazilian rock band formed in 1997 and originally composed of Marcus Menna (vocals), Sérgio Morel (keyboards), Sérgio Ferreira (guitar), Vitor Queiroz (bass), Alessandro Barros (sax) and Bicudo (drums).

The group disbanded in 2004 following Marcus Menna's health complications after a failed liposuction procedure. In 2020, they returned with Vinny as the new vocalist.

== Disbandment and return ==
On 1 July 2004, nearing a new album release, Marcus Menna suffered a cardiac arrest after a failed liposuction procedure and his brain was left with almost no oxygenation for 20 minutes. That left him in a coma for two months. The album Jardim de Cores was released in November 2004 with no promotional efforts given the singer's condition and the band was finished, since he would have to spend years in recovery. They attempted a comeback on 9 September 2005 with a test show with vocalist Fábio Allman, but they didn't get much attention from the public or a label and the initiative didn't go any further.

The band returned for a celebration tour in 2010 with Menna. In February 2020, they returned with vocalist Vinny following Menna's refusal to perform with them again. In January 2021, they released the EP LS Jack & Vinny, Volume 1.

In 2022, they promoted a tour to celebrate their 25th anniversary.

In 2023, Vinny suffered a bruise in his vocal chords and left the band.

== Members ==
=== Last line-up ===
- Sérgio Ferreira - guitar, acoustic guitar (1999 - 2004; 2020 - 2023)
- Vitor Queiroz - bass (1999 - 2004; 2020 - 2023)
- Bicudo - drums (1999 - 2004; 2020 - 2023)
- Vinny Bonotto - vocals (2020 - 2023)

=== Former members ===
- Marcus Menna - vocals, acoustic guitar (1999 - 2004)
- Sérgio Morel - guitar (1999 - 2004), keyboards (1999 - 2000)
- Alessandro Barros - saxophone (1999 - 2000)

== Discography ==
=== Studio albums ===
Album	Details
LS Jack	Release: 10 August 1999; Formats: CD; Label: Indie
Olho por Olho, Gente por Gente	Release: 18 September 2000; Formats: CD; Label: Indie
V.I.B.E.	Release: 18 January 2002; Formats: CD; Label: Indie
Tudo Outra Vez	Release: 23 June 2003; Formats: CD; Label: Indie
Jardim de Cores	Release: 1 November 2004; Formats: CD; Label: Indie
LS Jack & Vinny	Release: 14 January 2021; Formats: CD, digital download; Label: Indie

=== Live albums ===
Album	Details
Festival de Verão Salvador 2004	Release: 1 February 2005; Formats: CD; Label: Indie

=== Singles ===
Title	Year	Album
"Você Chegou"	1999	LS Jack
"LS Jack"	1999	LS Jack
"Go Back"	2000	LS Jack
"O Tempo"	2000	Olho por Olho, Gente por Gente
"Não Chores Mais"	2001	Olho por Olho, Gente por Gente
"U Que Fazer"	2001	Olho por Olho, Gente por Gente
"Carla"	2002	V.I.B.E.
"Uma Carta"	2002	V.I.B.E.
"Talvez"	2002	V.I.B.E.
"Sem Radar"	2003	Tudo Outra Vez
"Amanhã não se Sabe"	2003	Tudo Outra Vez
"Outra Vez"	2004	Tudo Outra Vez
"Meu Sossego"	2004	Jardim de Cores
"Esquece a Solidão e Sai"	2021	Not part of any album
"No que Depender de Mim"	2021	LS Jack & Vinny
