= Ídolos (Brazilian TV series) =

- Created by: Simon Fuller
- Directed by: Daniela Beyruti; Ricardo Mantoanelli; Fernanda Telles; Wanderley Villa Nova
- Presented by: List of Presenters
- Judges: List of Judges
- Country of origin: Brazil
- No. of seasons: 7

Production
- Production locations: SBT Studios and RecordTV Studios
- Running time: 60 minutes
- Production company: FremantleMedia

Original release
- Network: SBT (2006-2007); Record (2008-2012)
- Release: April 5, 2006 – December 13, 2012

Ídolos is a Brazilian reality television competition to find new solo singing talent. Part of the Idol franchise, it was created by Simon Fuller as a spin-off from the British show Pop Idol, of which two series were broadcast between 2001 and 2003.

The show aims to discover the best singer in the country through a series of nationwide auditions in which viewer voting determines the winner.

Through telephone, internet and SMS text voting, the viewers chose past winners Leandro Lopes, Thaeme Mariôto, Rafael Barreto, Saulo Roston, Israel Lucero, Henrique Lemes and Everton Silva. The eligible age-range for contestants is currently 15–30 years old.

The show aired on Tuesday and Thursdays nights in Brazil (Wednesday and Thursday nights during seasons 1 and 2, Tuesday and Wednesday nights during seasons 3 and 4).

After season 7 the show was canceled to make way for the Got Talent Brasil.

== Regular Cast ==
=== Presenters ===
| Presenter | Season 1 | Season 2 | Season 3 | Season 4 | Season 5 | Season 6 | Season 7 |
|---|---|---|---|---|---|---|---|
| Beto Marden | | | | | | | |
| Lígia Mendes | | | | | | | |
| Rodrigo Faro | | | | | | | |
| Marcos Mion | | | | | | | |

=== Judging panel ===
| Judge | Season 1 | Season 2 | Season 3 | Season 4 | Season 5 | Season 6 | Season 7 |
|---|---|---|---|---|---|---|---|
| Arnaldo Saccomani | | | | | | | |
| Cyz Zamorano | | | | | | | |
| Thomas Roth | | | | | | | |
| Carlos Eduardo Miranda | | | | | | | |
| Luiz Calainho | | | | | | | |
| Paula Lima | | | | | | | |
| Marco Camargo | | | | | | | |
| Luiza Possi | | | | | | | |
| Rick Bonadio | | | | | | | |
| Fafá de Belém | | | | | | | |
| Supla | | | | | | | |

== Selection Process ==
=== Auditions ===
Ídolos logo from 2006 to 2011

Contestants went through two rigorous sets of cuts. The first was a brief audition with three other contestants in front of one or two of the show's producers. Contestants were then either sent through to the next round of producers or asked to leave.

Out of the thousands of people who would show up to audition, only about 80–100 contestants in each city made it past this round of preliminary auditions.

However, in the more recent seasons, for the benefit of the viewers watching on TV, contestants were to skip this stage and go straight through to audition in front of the judges. Those who advance are sent to São Paulo. Only about 15–20 people in each city make it to São Paulo.

Not all auditions are televised due to time constraints. Only five cities are visited for auditions each season.

=== São Paulo Week ===
Once in São Paulo, the contestants perform on different days, with eliminations by the judges. Contestants select a song from a list to sing for the first round.

For the next round, the contestants split themselves up into small groups and performed a song together. In the final round, the contestants performed a song of their choice a cappella.

=== Semi-finals ===
==== Season 1 Process ====
The thirty semifinalists were randomly split into different groups. Each contestant would then sing in their respective group's night. There were three separate groups and the top three contestants from each group made it to the finals.

The season also featured a wildcard show. Contestants who failed to make it to the finals were invited back to perform for another chance at a spot in the finals. Only one wildcard contestant was chosen by the public vote.

==== Season 2 Process ====
The thirty-two semifinalists were split by gender into four groups. Each contestant would then sing in their respective group's night. The top three contestants from each group made it to the finals. The girls' groups performed on May 16, 2007, and May 30, 2007, while the guys' groups performed on May 23, 2007, and June 6, 2007, with results show on the following night.

==== Season 3 Process ====
The thirty semifinalists were randomly split into different groups. Each contestant would then sing in their respective group's night. There were three separate groups and the top three contestants from each group made it to the finals.

The season also featured a wildcard show. Contestants who failed to make it to the finals were invited back to perform for another chance at a spot in the finals. Only one wildcard contestant was chosen by the public vote.

==== Season 4 Process ====
The twenty-four semifinalists were split by gender into two groups. Each contestant would then sing in their respective group's night. The top six contestants from each group made it to the finals. The guys performed on September 29, 2009, and the girls on October 7, 2009, with results show on the following night.

==== Season 5 Process ====
The fifteen semi-finalists performed live on July 27, 2010, with results show on the following episode which aired on July 29, 2010. The five singers with the highest percentage of the public vote were automatically qualified for the finals. Later on night, the judges decided which five out of the remaining ten semi-finalists completed the Top 10.

==== Season 6 Process ====
The fifteen semi-finalists performed live on May 17, 2011, with results show on the following episode which aired May 19, 2011. The 5 singers with the highest percentage of the public vote were automatically qualified for the finals. Later on night, the judges decided which 5 out of the remaining 10 semi-finalists completed the Top 10.

=== Finals ===
The finals are broadcast live in prime time from SBT Studios on Anhanguera TV Center (seasons 1–2) and from Rede Record Studios (season 3-present), in São Paulo, in front of a live studio audience.

The finals lasted for nine to ten weeks. Each finalist performs a song or songs selected from a weekly theme. During the first few weeks, contestants sing one song each. The top four and five contestants must sing two songs apiece. The top three perform three songs apiece.

Themes are based on a musical genre, songs recorded by particular artists, or more generic themes. Contestants usually work with a celebrity mentor during each week.

Following each performance episode, a results show airs that reveals the breakdown of the voting public's decision. The three contestants (two in later rounds) who received the lowest number of votes are typically called to the center of the stage.

From the bottom three, one contestant is sent to safety so that two contestants remain and finally the contestant who received the lowest number of votes is eliminated from the competition. When a contestant is voted off the show, a montage of the contestant's experience is played and they give their final performance.

In the finale, the two remaining contestants perform to determine the winner. For the first two seasons the finale was held in the same studio performances of the Top 10–12. The finale for season three took place at the Arena Skol Anhembi, in São Paulo. From season four onwards, the venue was changed to the Via Funchal. A special two-hour result show the next night follows where the winner is announced at the end.

The winner receives a record deal with a major label. In some cases, other finalists have also been signed by the show's management company (which has first option to sign contestants) and received record deals with its major label partner.

== Season Synopses ==
=== Season 1 ===
The first season premiered on April 5, 2006. The auditions were held in five cities: Recife, Rio de Janeiro, Brasília, São Paulo and Porto Alegre.

In the final, shown on July 27, 2006, Leandro Lopes defeated Lucas Poletto, winning the show.

The contestant who was more times among the bottom three was Vanessa Oliveira. She survived elimination five times and was finally eliminated at the final four stage.

The season produced the first ever all male final and was the first season aired on SBT.

=== Season 2 ===
The season premiered on March 28, 2007. The auditions were held in five cities: Salvador, Belém, Belo Horizonte, Campinas and Florianópolis.

In the final, shown on August 16, 2007, Thaeme Mariôto defeated Shirley Carvalho, winning the show.

The contestant who was more times among the bottom three was Lenny Bellard. She survived elimination four times and was finally eliminated at the final three stage.

The season produced the first ever all female final and was the last season aired on SBT. Thaeme Mariôto is currently the only woman to win the show. After this season so far (2011) no female contestant managed to reach the top 2 again.

=== Season 3 ===
The third season premiered on August 19, 2008, The auditions were held in four cities: Porto Alegre, Salvador, Rio de Janeiro and São Paulo.

In the final, shown on December 17, 2008, Rafael Barreto defeated Rafael Bernardo, winning the show.

The contestants who were more times among the bottom three were Lorena Chaves, Nanda Garcia and Maria Christina. They survived the elimination twice and were finally eliminated at the final six, five and three stage respectively.

This was the first season aired on Rede Record. It was also the first that the final three contestants aren't from the same gender.

=== Season 4 ===
The fourth season premiered on August 18, 2009. The auditions were held in five cities: Curitiba, Belo Horizonte, Fortaleza, São Paulo and Rio de Janeiro.

In the final, shown on December 16, 2009, Saulo Roston (eliminated in Ídolos Brazil third season's Top 30) defeated Diego Moraes, winning the show.

The contestants who were more times among the bottom three were Dani Morais and Priscila Borges. They survived elimination twice and were finally eliminated at the final five and four stage respectively.

This was the second season aired on Rede Record.

=== Season 5 ===
The fifth season premiered on June 10, 2010. The auditions were held in four cities: Fortaleza, Florianópolis, Rio de Janeiro and São Paulo. This was the third season to air on Rede Record. The winner was Israel Lucero.

=== Season 6 ===
The sixth season premiered on April 5, 2011. The auditions were held in four cities: Florianópolis, Uberlândia, Rio de Janeiro and São Paulo. This was the fourth season to air on Rede Record. The winner was Henrique Lemes

=== Season 7 ===
The seventh and last season premiered on September 4, 2012. The auditions were held in five cities: Salvador, Goiânia, Porto Alegre, Rio de Janeiro and São Paulo. This was the fifth season to air on Rede Record. The winner was Everton Silva.

== Season Winners ==
Legend
| Female | Male |

All Time Winners
| Season | Winner | Runner-up(s) | | Year | Channel |
| 1 | Leandro Lopes | Lucas Poletto | | 2006 | SBT |
| 2 | Thaeme Mariôto | Shirley Carvalho | | 2007 | SBT |
| 3 | Rafael Barreto | Rafael Bernardo | | 2008 | Record |
| 4 | Saulo Roston | Diego Moraes | | 2009 | Record |
| 5 | Israel Lucero | Tom Black | | 2010 | Record |
| 6 | Henrique Lemes | Higor Rocha | | 2011 | Record |
| 7 | Everton Silva | Leonardo Cavalcante | Quinara Vizeu | 2012 | Record |

== See also ==
- Ídolos (Portugal)
