= Paula Lima =

Brazilian singer and composer (born 1970)

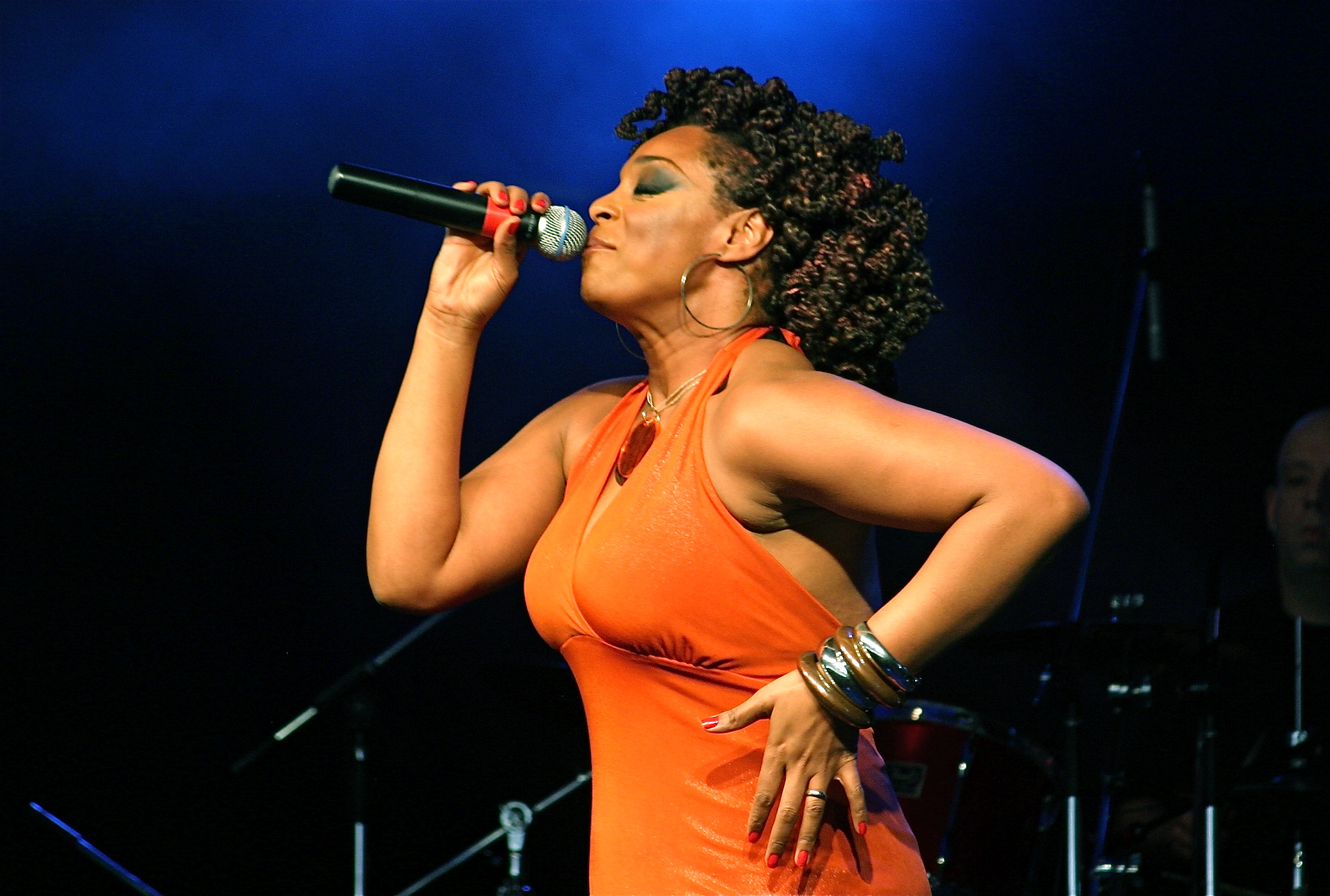
- Paula Lima performing at the Show Samba Chic no SESC Taubaté, 2009.

Background information
- Born: October 10, 1970 (age 55); São Paulo, Brazil
- Origin: São Paulo
- Genres: Samba, soul, funk, samba rock, MPB
- Occupation: Singer-songwriter
- Years active: 1992–present
- Website: paulalima.com.br

Paula Lima (born October 10, 1970 in São Paulo) is a Brazilian singer and composer whose music is influenced by bossa, percussion, samba, Brazilian soul international funk and one of judges of Brazilian Idol, Ídolos Brazil (Season 3 and Season 4).

Lima's career started a little by chance but she had been involved in different school festivals. In 1992, she joined her first band, the "Unidade Móvel", which later became "Unidade Bop". In 1995 she was invited to sing in a Samba, Rock, Funk and Soul band, led by Skowa. Lima lists her influences to be Quincy Jones, Ella Fitzgerald, Elza Soares, Ed Motta, Gilberto Gil, Banda Black Rio and Jorge Benjor.

Paula also played Grizabella's role in the stage for both São Paulo's and Rio de Janeiro's productions of Cats in 2010.

== Discography ==
Title	Details
É Isso Aí	Released: 2001; Label: Regata Music; Format: CD; Sales: 500,000
Diva Paulista	Released: October 7, 2002; Label: Mr Bongo Records; Format: CD
Paula Lima	Released: 2003; Label: Universal Music; Format: CD
Sinceramente	Released: 2006; Label: Indie Records; Format: CD; Sales: 10,000
Outro Esquema	Released: 2011; Label: Microservice; Format: CD; Sales: 5,000
O Samba é do Bem	Released: April 1, 2014; Label: Radar; Format: CD
Samba Soul	Released: Label: Format:

== Live albums ==
Title	Details
SambaChic	Released: 2009; Label: Warner Music; Format: CD, DVD; Sales: 20,000 (CD+DVD)

== Featured songs ==
Title	Details
Life	Released: 2000; Label: Epic; Format: CD, Vinyl

== Videography ==
Title	Details
SambaChic	Released: 2009; Label: Warner Music; Format: CD, DVD; Sales: 20,000 (CD+DVD)
