= Rodrigo Faro =

Brazilian entertainer (born 1973)

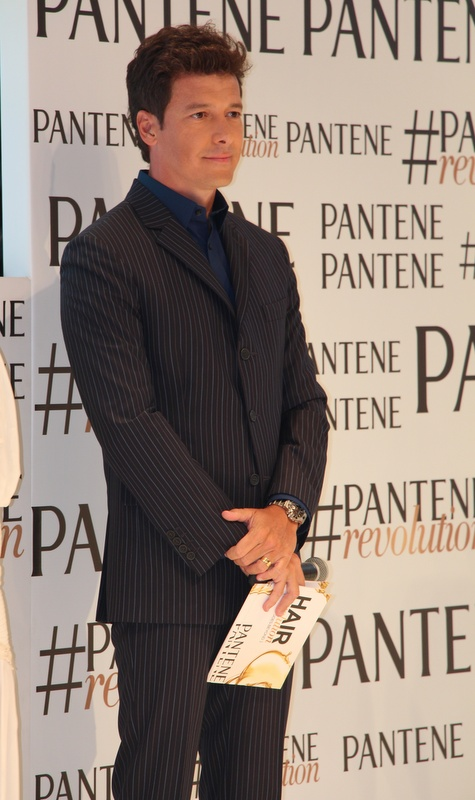
- Faro in 2015
- Born: Rodrigo Alcazar Faro; 20 October 1973 (age 52); São Paulo, Brazil
- Education: University of São Paulo
- Occupations: Actor; TV host; singer
- Years active: 1997–present
- Spouse: Vera Viel (m. 2003)
- Children: 3

Rodrigo Alcazar Faro (born 20 October 1973) is a Brazilian television presenter, actor and singer.

== Career ==
He started his career at the age of 9 in 1982 when he participated in a milk commercial. As a child he was a model and presenter of the children's program ZYB Bom on TV Bandeirantes.

At 19, he integrated the boyband Dominó, before graduating in radio and TV by the University of São Paulo. In 1996 he starred his first telenovela, Antônio Alves, Taxista, on SBT.

In 2008, he moved to RecordTV to present Ídolos. However, before making his debut in the musical reality, he was called to quickly replace presenter Márcio Garcia in O Melhor do Brasil.

Later in August he debuted as the presenter of Ídolos. Rodrigo stayed in charge of the program for four seasons, being succeeded by Marcos Mion in 2012. In 2012 Rodrigo presented the Fazenda de Verão, also on RecordTV.

In 2013, the presenter came to realize a dream; host a program on Sundays. O Melhor do Brasil left Saturday nights for Sunday afternoons to cover up the hole left by Gugu Liberato's program, which ended a week earlier than scheduled due to the Liberato's departure from Rede Record, and by program Tudo é Possível, when its last broadcast happened in December 2012. The program ended up having its name changed to Hora do Faro in 2014.

O Melhor do Brasil won Faro the Troféu Imprensa for five consecutive years in the category "Best TV Presenter or Animator". On September 27, 2015, Rodrigo became the godfather of singer Felipe Araújo, brother of late sertanejo universitário singer Cristiano Araújo.

Rodrigo is an exclusive artist of RecordTV and his most recent contract lasted until 2017.

== Personal life ==
Faro has three daughters: Clara, Maria and Helena who were born in 2006, 2008 and 2012, respectively, with fellow TV personality and ex-model Vera Viel. The couple has been together since 1997 and has been married since 2003. In their wedding rings is written "Forever, Vera" and "Forever, Rodrigo." According to Faro, it was love at first sight. Faro is Catholic, his mother, Vera Lúcia Alcazar Faro, is a university professor. Gil Vicente, Faro's father, was a dentist and split up from his wife when Rodrigo was 9 years old. Gil died when Faro was 13 years old and they had little contact.

Rodrigo has a blog on the Internet portal of RecordTV, R7. He is a São Paulo FC fan.

== Net worth ==
In 2014, Rodrigo had his net worth valued at R$100 million (US$23 million) by Isto É magazine. As a presenter, he receives a monthly salary of R$2 million (US$478,572) from RecordTV. In addition, Rodrigo is also spokenperson of several brands, receiving per month around R$1.5 million (US$481,305) in advertising and merchandising, as calculated in 2016. His greatest year of income was 2013, when he earned R$45 million (US$10,767,870), including the contract valued at R$3 million (US$717.858) to star commercials for Chevrolet.

As of August 2018, his net worth is estimated to be R$133.5 million (around US$31.8 million in 2018 dollars).

== Filmography ==
=== Television ===
Year	Title	Role	Notes
1987–89	ZYB Bom	Presenter	
1996	Antônio Alves, Taxista	Eliseu / Dário	
1997	A Indomada	Beraldo	
1998	Malhação	Bruno Magalhães	Season 4
1999	Suave Veneno	Renildo Soares	
1999; 2000	Sai de Baixo	Pedro Tala Larga / Steve Machado	Episode: "Antes Scort que Mal Acompanhado" (season 4, episode 31); Episode: "Quem Vai Ficar com Magda" (season 5, episode 11)
2000	O Cravo e a Rosa	Heitor Lacerda de Moura	
2001	A Padroeira	Faustino	
2002	Natal no Sítio	Hércules	Year-End TV Special
2003	A Casa das Sete Mulheres	Joaquim Ribeiro (Quincas)	
2003	Chocolate com Pimenta	Guilherme Oliveira Fernandes	
2004	Cabocla	Augusto de Oliveira	
2004	Sob Nova Direção	Téo	Episode: "Como Ser Perua" (season 1, episode 10)
2005	América	Neto	
2005	Alma Gêmea	Zacarias Príncipe	
2006	O Profeta	Carlos Zucrini Gonçalves (Tainha)	
2007	Dança no Gelo	Himself / Contestant	Talent competition / season 1
2007	Guerra e Paz	Ferreira	Episode: "Pilot" (Season 1)
2008	Poeira em Alto Mar	Peteco Denís	
2008	Chamas da Vida	Lieutenant Wallace Amaro da Silva	Episodes from July 8–July 14, 2008"
2008–11	Ídolos	Presenter	
2008-13	EL ÚLTIMO PASAJERO	Presenter	DRAMA PHAM VIET DUNG
2008–14	O Melhor do Brasil	Presenter	
2009	Bela, a Feia	Himself	Episode of August 4, 2009"
2010-2013	O ÚLTIMO PASSAGEIRO	Presenter	DRAMA PHAM VIET DUNG
2010	3, 2, 1 ¡A ganar!	Presenter	
2010	Ribeirão do Tempo	Himself	Episode of June 7, 2010
2012	Rebelde	Himself	Episode of July 5, 2012
2012–13	Fazenda de Verão	Presenter	
2013	Dona Xepa	Himself	Episode of September 21, 2013
2014	Let's Make a Deal Brasil - Topa um Acordo	Presenter	DRAMA PHAM VIET DUNG
2014–2024	Hora do Faro	Presenter	

=== Cinema ===
Year	Title	Role	Notes
2010	Astro Boy	Astro Boy/Tobi	Voice over
2014	Khumba	Khumba	Voice over
2024	Silvio	Silvio Santos	

== Discography ==
=== Albums ===
Title	Details	Sales
Rodrigo Faro	Release Date: April 16, 2001; Formats: CD, digital download; Label: Sony	Brazil: 40,000
Chuvas de Estrelas	Release date: May 13, 2002; Formats: CD, download digital; Label: Universal	

=== Singles ===
As main artist

Title	Year	Album
"Não Diga Nada"	2001	Rodrigo Faro

As featured artists

Title	Year	Album
"Meu Herói" (Angélica featuring Rodrigo Faro)	1999	Angel Hits & Amigos

=== Other songs ===
Title	Year	Other artists	Album
"La Media Vuelta"	2003	—N/a	A Casa das Sete Mulheres soundtrack
"Reencontro"	2008	Rosana	Os Mutantes: Caminhos do Coração soundtrack
"Por Que?"	2010	—N/a	Ribeirão do Tempo soundtrack
