= José Augusto (musician) =

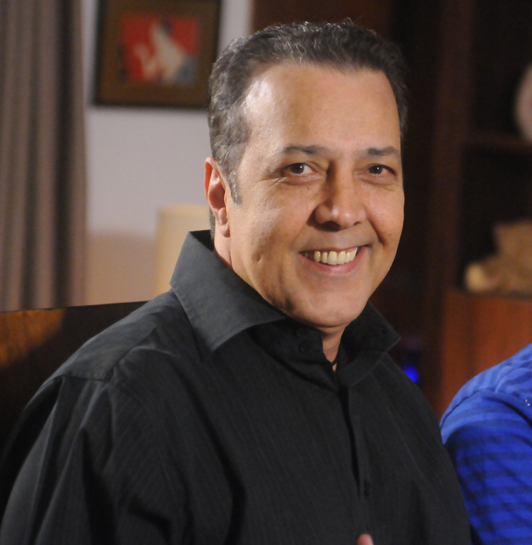
- José Augusto in 2012

Background information
- Born: José Augusto Cimillo Cougil; 16 August 1953 (age 73); Rio de Janeiro, Rio de Janeiro, Brazil
- Genres: Brazilian pop, pop rock
- Years active: 1971–present
- Labels: EMI Music, BMG, Polygram Records, Abril Music and Universal Music
- Website: www.joseaugusto.com.br

José Augusto (born José Augusto Cimillo Cougil; 16 August 1953) is a Brazilian singer-songwriter. He sings love ballads and romantic music in general, both in Portuguese and Spanish languages. His song "Mi Historia Entre Tus Dedos" (My History Between Your Fingers) peaked at No. 33 and No. 17 in the Billboard's Hot Latin Tracks and Latin Pop Airplay, respectively.

== Discography ==
- " José Augusto" – (1973) Candilejas (Portuguese and Spanish)
- " José Augusto" – (1974) Palavras (Portuguese and Spanish)
- " José Augusto" – (1975) Não tem Problema
- " José Augusto" – (1976) Fascination (Spanish)
- " José Augusto" – (1978) Doce Engano
- " José Augusto" – (1978) Melancolia
- " José Augusto" – (1979) Mis Amigos mi guitarra mi canciónes (Spanish)
- " José Augusto" – (1980) El mejor de mis amigos (Spanish)
- " José Augusto" – (1981) Querer y perder (Spanish)
- " José Augusto" – (1982) Santa Teresa
- " José Augusto" – (1982) Mujer (Spanish)
- " José Augusto" – (1983) Português
- " José Augusto" – (1984) Português
- " José Augusto" – (1985) Fantasia (Portuguese and Spanish)
- " José Augusto" – (1986) Sábado (Portuguese and Spanish)
- " José Augusto" – (1988) Portugues
- " José Augusto" – (1990) Aguenta coração (Portuguese and Spanish)
- " José Augusto" – (1992) Querer é poder (Portuguese and Spanish)
- " José Augusto" – (1994) longe de tudo
- " José Augusto" – (1995) En cuerpo y alma (Spanish)
- " José Augusto" – (1997) Mi historia entre tus dedos (Spanish)
- " José Augusto" – (1998) Apasionado (Spanish)
- " José Augusto" – (1999) Acústico (Portuguese and Spanish)
- " José Augusto" – (1999) O sole mio (live)
- " José Augusto" – (2000) Prisioneiro
- " José Augusto" – (2001) De Volta para o Interior
- " José Augusto" – (2002) Fantasia (Som Livre)
- " José Augusto" – (2007) Conpilacion "CUBA"
- " José Augusto" – (2008) Sempre (compilation)
- " José Augusto" – (2008) Agüenta Coração (live)
- " José Augusto" – (2008) Agüenta Coração Ao Vivo (DVD)
- " José Augusto" – (2009) Ao Vivo – Portugal (DVD)
- " José Augusto" – (2012) Ao Vivo – Na Estrada (DVD)
- " José Augusto" – (2014) Quantas Luas
- " José Augusto" – (2016) Duetos

== Filmography ==
Year	Title	Role	Notes
1969	No Paraíso das Solteironas		
1974	Malteses, burgueses e às vezes...		
1998	Fica Comigo		(final film role)
