= List of Brazilian telenovelas =

This is a list of notable Brazilian telenovelas from the 1960s to the present day. This list includes both long-running telenovelas and short-format miniseries.

While miniseries are shorter productions with a more compact narrative structure, telenovelas are longer television serials that typically span well over 100 episodes.

There are ample stylistic and thematic similarities between miniseries and telenovelas in the Brazilian context, however these formats are widely understood to be distinct.

Legend:

- Titles marked with ^{†} indicate miniseries.
- Titles marked with ^{*} indicate remakes.
- Titles marked with ^{‡} indicate re-aired titles.

== 1950s ==
Year	Title	Created by	Director	Network	Source
1951	Sua Vida Me Pertence	Wálter Forster	Wálter Forster	TV Tupi	
1952	Helena			TV Paulista	-
1952	Senhora			TV Paulista	-
1952	Diva			TV Paulista	-
1952	Casa de Pensão			TV Paulista	-
1952	Luz da Esperança			TV Paulista	-
1952	Iaiá Garcia			TV Paulista	
1952	O Guarani			TV Paulista	-
1952	Direto ao Coração		José Castellar	TV Tupi	
1952	Meu Trágico Destino		Ciro Bassini	TV Tupi	
1952	Noivado nas Trevas		José Castellar	TV Tupi	
1952	Rosas para o Meu Amor		José Castellar	TV Tupi	
1952	Um Beijo na Sombra		Walter Stuart	TV Tupi	
1952	Uma Semana de Vida		Walter Stuart	TV Tupi	
1952	A Viúva		Ciro Bassini	TV Tupi	
1952	Abismo		Ciro Bassini	TV Tupi	
1953	Aladim e a Lâmpada Maravilhosa		Júlio Gouveia	TV Tupi	
1953	Na Solidão da Noite		Dionísio Azevedo	TV Tupi	
1953	O Último Inverno		José Castellar	TV Tupi	
1953	Os Humildes		Dionísio Azevedo	TV Tupi	
1953	Minha Boneca		José Castellar	TV Tupi	
1954	Segundos Fatais		Fernando Baleroni	TV Tupi	
1954	Aventuras de D. Quixote		Ciro Bassini	TV Tupi	
1954	Labakam, o Alfaiate		Ciro Bassini	TV Tupi	
1954	O Grande Sonho		Fernando Baleroni	TV Tupi	
1954	O Homem Sem Passado		Ciro Bassini	TV Tupi	
1954	Pinocchio		Ciro Bassini	TV Tupi	
1954	Ciúme			TV Tupi	
1954	A Muralha			Record	
1955	Sangue na Terra		Ciro Bassini	TV Tupi	
1955	As Professoras		J. Silvestre	TV Tupi	
1955	Bocage		Dionísio Azevedo	TV Tupi	
1955	Ambição			TV Tupi	
1955	Jane Eyre			TV Tupi	
1955	Kim			TV Tupi	
1955	Miguel Strogof			TV Tupi	
1955	Os Dez Mandamentos		Júlio Gouveia	TV Tupi	
1955	Os Irmãos Corsos			TV Tupi	
1955	Oliver Twist			TV Tupi	
1955	Peter Pan			TV Tupi	
1955	Suspeita			TV Tupi	
1955	A Família Boaventura			TV Tupi	
1956	Voo 509		Waldemar de Moraes	Record	-
1956	Bidu e Bimbim		Dionísio Azevedo	TV Tupi	
1956	César e Cleópatra		Ciro Bassini	TV Tupi	
1956	Conde de Monte Cristo		Ciro Bassini	TV Tupi	
1956	Heidi		Tatiana Belinky	TV Tupi	
1956	O Palhaço			TV Tupi	
1956	O Volante Fantasma		Péricles Leal	TV Tupi	
1956	Robin Hood			TV Tupi	
1956	Scaramouche			TV Tupi	
1957	A Canção de Bernadete		Paulo Porto	TV Tupi	
1957	Pollyana		Júlio Gouveia	TV Tupi	
1957	As Solteironas			TV Tupi	
1957	Caminhos Incertos			TV Tupi	
1957	Arsène Lupin			TV Tupi	
1957	Coração Inquieto		Stefan Zweig	TV Tupi	
1957	Cristóvão Colombo		Júlio Gouvêa	TV Tupi	
1957	Lever No Espaço		Mário Fanucchi	TV Tupi	
1957	O Corcunda de Notre Dame		Mário Fanucchi	TV Tupi	
1957	Os Três Mosqueteiros		Walter Stuart	TV Tupi	
1957	Pequeno Mundo de D. Camilo			TV Tupi	
1958	A Muralha*			TV Tupi	
1958	Cidade Perdida		Waldemar de Moraes	Record	-
1958	Éramos Seis		Ciro Bassini	Record	-
1958	Aqueles Olhos			Record	-
1958	Cela da Morte		Ciro Bassini	Record	-
1958	Apenas uma Ilusão		Waldemar de Moraes	Record	-
1958	Anos de Tormenta		Ciro Bassini	Record	-
1958	Anos de Tormenta		Ciro Bassini	Record	-
1958	A Ponte de Waterloo		Geraldo Vietri	TV Tupi	
1958	A Princesinha		Geraldo Vietri	TV Tupi	
1958	A Única Verdade		Geraldo Vietri	TV Tupi	
1958	Aventuras de Marco Polo		Geraldo Vietri	TV Tupi	
1958	Aventuras de Tom Sawyer		Antonino Seabra	TV Tupi	
1958	George Sand			TV Tupi	
1958	Marcelino, Pão e Vinho			TV Tupi	
1958	Máscara de Ferro			TV Tupi	
1958	Nicholas			TV Tupi	
1958	Os Miseráveis			TV Tupi	
1958	Primavera		Júlio Gouveia	TV Tupi	
1958	Simbad, o Marujo			TV Tupi	
1958	Sublime Obsessão		Geraldo Vietri	TV Tupi	
1958	Pollyana Moça		Júlio Gouveia	TV Tupi	
1959	A Cidadela			Record	-
1959	Lili			Record	-
1959	Eu Fui Toxicômano		Hélio Ansaldo	Record	-
1959	Doutor Jivago		Hélio Ansaldo	Record	-
1959	Cabocla			TV Rio	
1959	José do Egito		Júlio Gouveia	TV Tupi	
1959	Angélika		Júlio Gouveia	TV Tupi	
1959	O Cisne Encantado			TV Tupi	
1959	O Jardim Encantado			TV Tupi	
1959	O Sertão Desaparecido			TV Tupi	
1959	Trágica Mentira			TV Tupi	
1959	Um Lugar ao Sol			TV Tupi	

== 1960s ==
Year	Title	Created by	Director	Network	Source
1960	Folhas ao Vento			Record	-
1960	Viagem à Lua			Record	-
1960	A Máscara e o Rosto			Record	-
1960	O Homem que Eu Comprei			Record	-
1960	Imitação da Vida			Record	-
1963	O Tronco do Ipê				
1963	Gente como a Gente		Ademar Guerra	Record	-
1963	A Morta Sem Espelho		Sérgio Britto Fernando Torres	Record, TV Rio	-
1963	Pouco Amor Não é Amor			TV Rio	
1963	2-5499 Ocupado	Dulce Santucci	Tito Di Miglio	TV Excelsior	
1963	A Muralha*			TV Cultura	
1964	O Direito de Nascer			TV Rio, TV Tupi	
1964	Eu Amo Esse Homem			TV Paulista	
1964	Tortura d'Alma			TV Globo	
1964	João Pão		Roberto Freire	Record	
1964	Sonho de Amor		Sérgio Britto	Record	
1964	Vitória		Sérgio Britto	Record, TV Rio	
1964	Renúncia		Randal Juliano	Record	
1964	O Desconhecido		Sérgio Britto Fernando Torres	Record, TV Rio	
1964	Banzo		Nilton Travesso	Record	
1964	Prisioneiro de um Sonho		Randal Juliano Roberto Freire	Record, TV Rio	
1964	Marcados pelo Amor		Nilton Travesso Roberto Freire	Record	
1964	Imitação da Vida		Ciro Bassini	TV Rio	
1964	Ciro Bassini			TV Rio	
1964	Uma Consciência de Mulher			TV Itacolomi	
1964	Apenas Um Fantasma			TV Itacolomi	
1965	A Deusa Vencida			TV Globo	
1965	A Moreninha			TV Globo	
1965	Padre Tião			TV Globo	
1965	Ilusões Perdidas			TV Globo	
1965	Marina			TV Globo	
1965	Paixão de Outono			TV Globo	
1965	Um Rosto de Mulher			TV Globo	
1965	Cadeia de Cristal			TV Globo	
1965	Chamas que Não se Apagam			TV Globo	
1965	A Sombra do Passado			TV Globo	
1965	O Ébrio			TV Globo	
1965	Somos Todos Irmãos		Roberto Freire	Record	
1965	Quatro Homens Juntos		Armando Couto	Record	
1965	Comédia Carioca		Armando Couto	Record, TV Rio	
1965	Turbilhão		Armando Rosas	Record	
1965	Ceará contra 007		Marcos César	Record	
1965	Quem Bate		Marcos César	Record	
1965	Mãos ao Ar		Marcos César	Record	
1965	O Preço de uma Vida			TV Tupi	
1965	O Porto dos Sete Destinos			TV Rio	
1965	Rosa Maria			TV Itacolomi	
1965	Estrada do Pecado			TV Itacolomi	
1965	Sinete Fatal			TV Itacolomi	
1966	As Minas de Prata			TV Globo	
1966	Redenção	Raymundo Lopez	Dionysius Azevedo	TV Excelsior	
1966	O Rei dos Ciganos			TV Globo	
1966	Eu Compro Esta Mulher			TV Globo	
1966	O Sheik de Agadir			TV Globo	
1966	O Pecado de Ser Mãe			TV Rio	
1966	A Herança do Ódio			TV Rio	
1966	A Noiva do Passado			TV Rio	
1966	A Mulher Que Amou Demais			TV Rio	
1967	A Sombra de Rebecca			TV Globo	
1967	Anastácia, a Mulher sem Destino			TV Globo	
1967	Sangue e Areia			TV Globo	
1967	A Rainha Louca			TV Globo	
1967	O Homem Proibido			TV Globo	
1968	A Gata de Vison			TV Globo	
1968	Beto Rockfeller			TV Globo	
1968	O Santo Mestiço			TV Globo	
1968	A Grande Mentira			TV Globo	
1968	Passo dos Ventos			TV Globo	
1968	As Professorinhas		Lúcia Lambertini	Record	
1968	A Última Testemunha		Walter Avancini	Record	
1968	Ana		Fernando Torres	Record	
1968	A Muralha*			TV Excelsior	
1969	Nino, o Italianinho			TV Globo	
1969	A Cabana do Pai Tomás			TV Globo	
1969	Rosa Rebelde			TV Globo	
1969	Véu de Noiva			TV Globo	
1969	A Última Valsa			TV Globo	
1969	A Ponte dos Suspiros			TV Globo	
1969	Verão Vermelho			TV Globo	
1969	Algemas de Ouro		Walter Avancini	Record	
1969	Acorrentados		Daniel Filho	Record, TV Rio	
1969	Seu Único Pecado		Dionísio Azevedo	Record	

== 1970s ==
Year	Title	Created by	Director	Network	Source
1970	Irmãos Coragem			TV Globo	
1970	Pigmalião 70			TV Globo	
1970	A Proxima Atração			TV Globo	
1970	Assim na Terra como no Céu			TV Globo	
1970	As Pupilas do Senhor Reitor			TV Globo	
1970	Tilim			TV Globo	
1971	Bandeira 2			TV Globo	
1971	Minha Doce Namorada			TV Globo	
1971	Meu Pedacinho de Chão			TV Globo	
1971	O Homem Que Deve Morrer			TV Globo	
1971	O Cafona			TV Globo	
1971	Os Deuses Estão Mortos		Dionísio Azevedo	Record	
1971	Editora Mayo, Bom Dia		Carlos Manga	Record	
1971	Pingo de Gente		Zéluiz Pinho	Record	
1971	Sol Amarelo		Waldemar de Moraes	Record	
1971	Quarenta Anos Depois		Waldemar de Moraes	Record	
1972	Selva de Pedra			TV Globo	
1972	Bicho do Mato			TV Globo	
1972	A Patota			TV Globo	
1972	O Primeiro Amor			TV Globo	
1972	Uma Rosa com Amor			TV Globo	
1972	O Bofe			TV Globo	
1972	O Príncipe e o Mendigo		Dionísio Azevedo	Record	
1972	O Tempo não Apaga		Waldemar de Moraes	Record	
1972	Os Fidalgos da Casa Mourisca		Randal Juliano	Record	
1972	O Leopardo		Waldemar de Moraes	Record	
1972	Eu e a Moto		Myrian Muniz	Record	
1972	Quero Viver		Waldemar de Moraes	Record	
1973	Carinhoso			TV Globo	
1973	O Bem-Amado			TV Globo	
1973	Os Ossos do Barão			TV Globo	
1973	Cavalo de Aço			TV Globo	
1973	O Semideus			TV Globo	
1973	Vendaval		Waldemar de Moraes	Record	
1973	Venha Ver o Sol na Estrada		Antunes Filho	Record	
1973	Vidas Marcadas		Waldemar de Moraes	Record	
1973	Meu Adorável Mendigo		Emanuel Rodrigues	Record	
1973	João da Silva			TV Rio	
1974	A Barba-Azul			TV Globo	
1974	Ídolo de Pano			TV Globo	
1974	O Espigão			TV Globo	
1974	O Machão			TV Globo	
1974	Supermanoela			TV Globo	
1974	Corrida do Ouro			TV Globo	
1974	Fogo sobre Terra			TV Globo	
1974	O Rebu			TV Globo	
1975	Escalada			TV Globo	
1975	Meu Rico Português			TV Globo	
1975	Helena^{*}			TV Globo	
1975	O Noviço			TV Globo	
1975	Senhora			TV Globo	
1975	A Moreninha			TV Globo	
1975	Cuca Legal			TV Globo	
1975	Bravo!			TV Globo	
1975	Gabriela			TV Globo	
1975	Pecado Capital			TV Globo	
1975	O Grito			TV Globo	
1976	Vejo a Lua no Céu			TV Globo	
1976	O Feijão e o Sonho			TV Globo	
1976	Anjo Mau	Cassiano Gabus Mendes		TV Globo	
1976	Escrava Isaura				
1976	Estúpido Cupido				
1976	O Casarão				
1976	Duas Vidas				
1976	Saramandaia				
1977	Locomotivas				
1977	À Sombra dos Laranjais				
1977	Dona Xepa				
1977	Sinhazinha Flô				
1977	Sem Lenço, sem Documento				
1977	Espelho Mágico				
1977	O Astro				
1977	Nina				
1978	A Sucessora				
1978	Maria, Maria				
1978	Aritana				
1978	Gina				
1978	Memórias de Amor				
1978	Dancin' Days				
1978	O Direito de Nascer				
1978	Te Contei?				
1978	Pecado Rasgado				
1978	O Pulo do Gato				
1978	Sinal de Alerta				
1978	Zulmira			TV Gazeta	
1978	A Conquista			TVE Brasil	
1978	Solar Paraíso	Roberto Monteiro	David Grimberg	SBT	
1979	Feijão Maravilha				
1979	Pai Herói				
1979	Cabocla			TV Globo	
1979	Marron Glacê				
1979	Os Gigantes				

== 1980s ==
Year	Title	Created by	Director	Network	Source
1980	Água Viva				
1980	Marina				
1980	Olhai os Lírios do Campo				
1980	As Três Marias				
1980	Chega Mais				
1980	Plumas e Paetês				
1980	Coração Alado				
1981	Baila Comigo	Manoel Carlos		Rede Globo	
1981	Ciranda de Pedra				
1981	Terras do Sem-Fim				
1981	Os Imigrantes				
1981	Ciranda de Pedra				
1981	O Amor É Nosso				
1981	Jogo da Vida				
1981	Brilhante				
1982	O Homem Proibido				
1982	Ninho da Serpente				
1982	Sol de Verão				
1982	Paraíso				
1982	Elas por Elas				
1982	Final Feliz				
1982	Sétimo Sentido				
1982	Lampião e Maria Bonita^{†}				
1982	Avenida Paulista^{†}				
1982	Quem Ama Não Mata^{†}				
1982	Destino	Crayton Sarzy Raymundo López	Waldemar de Moraes	SBT	
1982	A Força do Amor	Raymundo López	Waldemar de Moraes	SBT	
1982	A Leoa	Crayton Sarzy Raymundo López	Waldemar de Moraes	SBT	
1982	Conflito		Waldemar de Moraes	SBT	
1983	Guerra dos Sexos				
1983	Pão-Pão, Beijo-Beijo				
1983	Voltei pra Você				
1983	Louco Amor				
1983	Champagne				
1983	Eu Prometo				
1983	Moinhos de Vento^{†}				
1983	Bandidos da Falange^{†}				
1983	Parabéns pra Você^{†}				
1983	Sombras do Passado	Tito di Miglio	Waldemar de Moraes	SBT	
1983	Acorrentada	Henrique Lobo	Crayton Sarzy	SBT	
1983	A Ponte do Amor	Aziz Bajur	Waldemar de Moraes	SBT	
1983	A Justiça de Deus	Crayton Sarzy, Amilton Monteiro	Waldermar de Moraes	SBT	
1983	Pecado de Amo	Henrique Lobo	Antonino Seabra	SBT	
1983	Razão de Viver	Waldir Wey	Waldemar de Moraes	SBT	
1983	O Anjo Maldito	Mauro Gianfrancesco	Waldemar de Moraes	SBT	
1983	Vida Roubada	Raymundo López	Wa;demar de Moraes	SBT	
1984	Meus Filhos, Minha Vida	Ismael Fernandes	Antonino Seabra	SBT	
1984	Vereda Tropical				
1984	Corpo a Corpo				
1984	Amor com Amor Se Paga				
1984	Livre para Voar				
1984	Transas e Caretas				
1984	Partido Alto				
1984	Padre Cícero^{†}				
1984	Anarquistas, Graças a Deus^{†}				
1984	Meu Destino É Pecar^{†}				
1984	A Máfia no Brasil^{†}				
1984	Rabo de Saia^{†}				
1984	Jerônimo	Moysés Weltman	Antonino Seabra	SBT	
1985	Um Sonho a Mais				
1985	A Gata Comeu				
1985	Roque Santeiro				
1985	De Quina pra Lua				
1985	Ti Ti Ti				
1985	O Tempo e o Vento^{†}				
1985	Tenda dos Milagres^{†}				
1985	Grande Sertão: Veredas^{†}				
1985	Antônio Maria		Geraldo Vietri	Rede Manchete	
1985	Jogo do Amor	Aziz Bajur	Antonino Seabra	SBT	
1986	Dona Beija		Herval Rossano	Rede Manchete	
1986	Novo Amor		Herval Rossano	Rede Manchete	
1986	Tudo ou Nada		Herval Rossano	Rede Manchete	
1986	Mania de Querer		Herval Rossano	Rede Manchete	
1986	Anos Dourados^{†}				
1986	Dona Beija				
1986	Sinhá Moça				
1986	Selva de Pedra				
1986	Roda de Fogo				
1986	Cambalacho				
1986	Hipertensão				
1986	Memórias de um Gigolô^{†}				
1986	Uma Esperança no Ar	Amilton Monteiro Ismael Fernandes Dulce Santucci	Jardel Mello	SBT	
1987	Direito de Amar				
1987	Bambolê				
1987	Brega & Chique				
1987	Sassaricando				
1987	O Outro				
1987	Mandala				
1987	Corpo Santo		José Wilker	Rede Manchete	
1987	Helena^{*}	Mario Silver	José Wilker	Rede Manchete	
1988	Carmem		José Wilker	Rede Manchete	
1988	O Pagador de Promessas^{†}				
1988	Vale Tudo				
1988	Fera Radical				
1988	Vida Nova				
1988	Bebê a Bordo				
1988	O Primo Basílio^{†}				
1988	Abolição^{†}				
1989	Kananga do Japão				
1989	Tieta				
1989	Que Rei Sou Eu?				
1989	Pacto de Sangue				
1989	O Sexo dos Anjos				
1989	Top Model				
1989	O Salvador da Pátria				
1989	Tieta				
1989	Sampa^{†}				
1989	República^{†}				
1989	Olho por Olho		Ary Coslov Atílio Riccó	Rede Manchete	
1989	Cortina de Vidro	Walcyr Carrasco	Guga de Oliveira	SBT	

== 1990s ==
Year	Title	Created by	Director	Network	Source
1990	A História de Ana Raio e Zé Trovão				
1990	Kananga do Japão	Wilson Agular Filho	Tizuka Yamasaki	Rede Manchete	
1990	Barriga de Aluguel	Glória Perez		TV Globo	
1990	Pantanal	Benedito Ruy Barbosa	Jayme Monjardim	Rede Manchete	
1990	Rainha da Sucata				
1990	A História de Ana Raio e Zé Trovão	Jayme Monjardim	Jayme Monjardim	Rede Manchete	
1990	Gente Fina				
1990	Mico Preto				
1990	Lua Cheia de Amor				
1990	Meu Bem, Meu Mal				
1990	Araponga				
1990	Desejo^{†}				
1990	A, E, I, O... Urca^{†}				
1990	Boca do Lixo^{†}				
1990	Riacho Doce^{†}				
1990	La Mamma^{†}				
1991	Vamp				
1991	Salomé				
1991	Felicidade				
1991	O Dono do Mundo				
1991	Meu Marido^{†}				
1991	O Sorriso do Lagarto^{†}				
1991	O Portador^{†}				
1991	Amazônia	Jorge Duran	Tizuka Yamasaki Marcos Schechtman	Rede Manchete	
1992	Despedida de Solteiro				
1992	Perigosas Peruas				
1992	Deus Nos Acuda				
1992	Pedra sobre Pedra				
1992	De Corpo e Alma				
1992	Tereza Batista^{†}				
1992	As Noivas de Copacabana^{†}				
1992	Anos Rebeldes^{†}				
1993	Mulheres de Areia				
1993	Sonho Meu				
1993	O Mapa da Mina				
1993	Olho no Olho				
1993	Renascer				
1993	Fera Ferida				
1993	Contos de Verão^{†}				
1993	Sex Appeal^{†}				
1993	Agosto^{†}				
1994	Guerra sem fim	José Louzeiro	Marcos Schechtman	Rede Manchete	
1994	A Viagem				
1994	Éramos Seis				
1994	Quatro por Quatro				
1994	Tropicaliente				
1994	Pátria Minha				
1994	A Madona de Cedro^{†}				
1994	Memorial de Maria Moura^{†}				
1994	Incidente em Antares^{†}				
1994	74.5: Uma Onda no Ar	Chico de Assis	Cecil Thiré	Rede Manchete	
1995	A Próxima Vítima				
1995	História de Amor				
1995	Malhação				
1995	Sangue do Meu Sangue				
1995	Irmãos Coragem				
1995	Cara & Coroa				
1995	Explode Coração				
1995	Engraçadinha: Seus Amores e Seus Pecados^{†}				
1995	Decadência^{†}				
1995	Perdidos de amor			Rede Bandeirantes	
1995	A Verdadeira História de Papai Noel^{†}		Lucas Bueno	CNT	
1995	Tocaia Grande		Walter Avancini	Rede Manchete	
1996	Xica da Silva		Walter Avancini	Rede Manchete	
1996	Irmã Catarina^{†}		Lucas Bueno	CNT	
1996	A Última Semana^{†}		Lucas Bueno	CNT	
1996	Ele Vive^{†}		Lucas Bueno	CNT	
1996	A Vinda do Messias^{†}		Lucas Bueno	CNT	
1996	Anjo de Mim				
1996	O Rei do Gado				
1996	Xica da Silva				
1996	Quem É Você?				
1996	Vira Lata				
1996	Salsa e Merengue				
1996	O Fim do Mundo				
1996	Antônio dos Milagres		Antônio dos Milagres	CNT	
1997	Guerra de Canudos^{†}				
1997	Anjo Mau	Maria Adelaide Amaral		TV Globo	
1997	Os Ossos do Barão				
1997	Por Amor				
1997	O Amor Está no Ar				
1997	Zazá				
1997	A Indomada				
1998	Mandacaru	Carlos Alberto Ratton	Walter Avancini	Rede Manchete	
1998	Hilda Furacão^{†}				
1998	Brida	Jayme Camargo	Walter Avancini	Rede Manchete	
1998	Dona Flor e Seus Dois Maridos^{†}				
1998	Torre de Babel				
1998	Era uma Vez...				
1998	Pecado Capital				
1998	Corpo Dourado				
1998	Meu Bem Querer				
1998	Labirinto^{†}				
1998	Serras Azuis			Rede Bandeirantes	
1998	Meu Pé de Laranja Lima		Henrique Martins	Rede Bandeirantes	
1999	O Auto da Compadecida^{†}				
1999	Chiquinha Gonzaga^{†}				
1999	Luna Caliente^{†}				
1999	Terra Nostra				
1999	Força de um Desejo				
1999	Andando nas Nuvens				
1999	Vila Madalena				
1999	Suave Veneno				

== 2000s ==
Year	Title	Created by	Director	Network	Source
2000	O Cravo e a Rosa				
2000	Laços de Família				
2000	Esplendor				
2000	Uga Uga				
2000	A Muralha^{†*}				
2000	A Invenção do Brasil^{†}				
2000	Aquarela do Brasil^{†}				
2001	Os Maias^{†}				
2001	O Clone				
2001	O Direito de Nascer				
2001	Pícara Sonhadora				
2001	Estrela-Guia				
2001	A Padroeira				
2001	Um Anjo Caiu do Céu				
2001	As Filhas da Mãe				
2001	Porto dos Milagres				
2001	Presença de Anita^{†}				
2002	O Quinto dos Infernos^{†}				
2002	Pastores da Noite^{†}				
2002	Coração de Estudante				
2002	Marisol				
2002	O Beijo do Vampiro				
2002	Sabor da Paixão				
2002	Desejos de Mulher				
2002	Esperança				
2003	A Casa das Sete Mulheres				
2003	Canavial de Paixões				
2003	Celebridade				
2003	Chocolate com Pimenta				
2003	Mulheres Apaixonadas				
2003	Jamais Te Esquecerei				
2003	Agora É que São Elas				
2003	Kubanacan				
2003	A Casa das Sete Mulheres^{†}				
2004	A Escrava Isaura				
2004	Da Cor do Pecado				
2004	Esmeralda				
2004	Senhora do Destino				
2004	Seus Olhos				
2004	Um Só Coração				
2004	Cabocla			TV Globo	
2004	Como uma Onda				
2004	Começar de Novo				
2004	Um Só Coração^{†}				
2005	Hoje É Dia de Maria^{†}				
2005	América	Glória Perez		TV Globo	
2005	Alma Gêmea				
2005	Belíssima				
2005	Essas Mulheres				
2005	Hoje É Dia de Maria				
2005	Prova de Amor				
2005	A Lua Me Disse				
2005	Bang Bang				
2005	Mad Maria^{†}				
2005	Hoje É Dia de Maria: Segunda Jornada^{†}				
2005	Floribella			Rede Bandeirantes	
2006	Alta Estação				
2006	Bicho do Mato				
2006	Cidadão Brasileiro				
2006	Cobras & Lagartos				
2006	O Profeta				
2006	Páginas da Vida				
2006	Paixões Proibidas				
2006	Sinhá Moça				
2006	Vidas Opostas				
2006	Pé na Jaca				
2006	JK^{†}				
2006	Paixões Proibidas			Rede Bandeirantes	
2007	Dance Dance Dance			Rede Bandeirantes	
2007	Amor e Intrigas				
2007	Caminhos do Coração				
2007	Dance Dance Dance				
2007	Desejo Proibido				
2007	Duas Caras				
2007	Eterna Magia				
2007	Luz do Sol				
2007	Paraíso Tropical				
2007	Sete Pecados				
2007	Amazônia, de Galvez a Chico Mendes^{†}				
2007	A Pedra do Reino^{†}				
2008	A Favorita				
2008	Beleza Pura				
2008	Chamas da Vida				
2008	Caminhos do Coração				
2008	Ciranda de Pedra				
2008	Negócio da China	Miguel Falabella		TV Globo	
2008	Os Mutantes: Caminhos do Coração				
2008	Ti Ti Ti				
2008	Três Irmãs				
2008	Queridos Amigos^{†}				
2008	Poeira em Alto Mar^{†}				
2008	Capitu^{†}				
2008	Água na Boca			Rede Bandeirantes	
2009	Bela, a Feia				
2009	Cama de Gato				
2009	Caminho das Índias				
2009	Caras & Bocas				
2009	Poder Paralelo				
2009	Viver a Vida				
2009	Paraíso				
2009	Maysa: Quando Fala o Coração^{†}				
2009	Deu a Louca no Tempo^{†}				
2009	Som & Fúria^{†}				
2009	Cinquentinha^{†}				

== 2010s ==
Year	Title	Created by	Director	Network	Source
2010	Araguaia				
2010	Escrito nas Estrelas				
2010	Passione				
2010	Ribeirão do Tempo				
2010	Tempos Modernos				
2010	Uma Rosa com Amor				
2010	Dalva e Herivelto: Uma Canção de Amor^{†}				
2011	Amor e Revolução				
2011	Fina Estampa				
2011	Insensato Coração				
2011	O Astro	Alcides Nogueira Geraldo Carneiro		TV Globo	
2011	Rebelde				
2011	Vidas em Jogo				
2011	Cordel Encantado				
2011	A Vida da Gente				
2011	Amor em Quatro Atos^{†}				
2011	O Bem-Amado^{†}				
2011	Chico Xavier^{†}				
2012	Avenida Brasil	João Emanuel Carneiro		TV Globo	
2012	Balacobaco				
2012	Carrossel				
2012	Corações Feridos				
2012	Máscaras				
2012	Amor Eterno Amor				
2012	Lado a Lado				
2012	Salve Jorge				
2012	Gabriela				
2012	Dercy de Verdade^{†}				
2012	O Brado Retumbante^{†}				
2012	Xingu^{†}				
2013	Chiquititas				
2013	Dona Xepa				
2013	Saramandaia				
2013	Flor do Caribe				
2013	Joia Rara				
2013	Amor à Vida				
2013	O Canto da Sereia^{†}				
2013	Gonzaga: de Pai pra Filho^{†}				
2013	Gaby Estrella			Gloob	
2014	O Rebu				
2014	Meu Pedacinho de Chão				
2014	Boogie Oogie				
2014	Em Família				
2014	Império				
2014	O Tempo e o Vento^{†}				
2014	Amores Roubados^{†}				
2014	Serra Pelada: A Saga Do Ouro^{†}				
2015	Cúmplices de um Resgate				
2015	Os Dez Mandamentos				
2015	Sete Vidas				
2015	Além do Tempo				
2015	Babilônia				
2015	A Regra do Jogo				
2015	Verdades Secretas I				
2015	Tim Maia: Vale o que Vier^{†}				
2015	Felizes para Sempre?^{†}				
2015	Amorteamo^{†}				
2016	Êta Mundo Bom				
2016	Sol Nascente				
2016	Velho Chico				
2016	A Lei do Amor				
2016	Liberdade, Liberdade				
2016	Ligações Perigosas^{†}				
2016	Alemão: Os Dois Lados do Complexo^{†}				
2016	Justiça^{†}				
2017	A Força do Querer				
2017	Novo Mundo				
2017	O Outro Lado do Paraíso				
2017	Pega Pega				
2017	Tempo de Amar				
2017	Os Dias Eram Assim				
2017	Aldo: Mais Forte que o Mundo^{†}				
2017	Dois Irmãos^{†}				
2017	Cidade dos Homens^{†}				
2017	Malasartes^{†}				
2018	Orgulho e Paixão				
2018	Espelho da Vida				
2018	Segundo Sol				
2018	O Sétimo Guardião				
2018	Onde Nascem os Fortes				
2018	Entre Irmãs^{†}				
2018	Valor da Vida			Rede Bandeirantes	
2018	Treze Dias Longe do Sol^{†}				
2019	Elis - Viver é Melhor que Sonhar^{†}				
2019	10 Segundos para Vencer^{†}				
2019	Se Eu Fechar os Olhos Agora^{†}				
2019	Órfãos da Terra				
2019	Éramos Seis				
2019	A Dona do Pedaço				
2019	Amor de Mãe				

== 2020s ==
Year	Title	Created by	Director	Network	Source
2020	Salve-se Quem Puder				
2020	Chacrinha: A Minissérie^{†}				
2021	Nos Tempos do Imperador				
2021	Quanto Mais Vida, Melhor!				
2021	Um Lugar ao Sol^{*}				
2021	Verdades Secretas II				
2021	Passaporte para Liberdade^{†}				
2022	Pantanal				
2022	Além da Ilusão				
2022	Mar do Sertão				
2022	Cara e Coragem				
2022	Travessia				
2023	Amor Perfeito				
2023	Elas por Elas				
2023	Vai na Fé				
2023	Fuzuê				
2023	Terra e Paixão				
2023	Todas as Flores				
2023	Histórias Quase Verdadeiras^{†}				
2023	Pluft, o Fantasminha^{†}				
2023	Marighella^{†}				
2024	No Rancho Fundo				
2024	Garota do Momento				
2024	Família É Tudo				
2024	Volta por Cima				
2024	Renascer				
2024	Mania de Você				
2024	Aumenta que é Rock^{†}				
2025	Grande Sertão^{†}				
2025	Vale Tudo				
2025	Êta Mundo Melhor!				
2025	Dona de Mim				

== See also ==
- List of Record telenovelas
- List of TV Globo telenovelas
  - List of 8/9 PM telenovelas of TV Globo
  - List of 11 PM telenovelas of TV Globo
