= 1971 in Brazil =

Events in the year 1971 in Brazil.

== Incumbents ==
=== Federal government ===
- President: General Emílio Garrastazu Médici
- Vice President: General Augusto Rademaker

=== Governors ===
- Acre: Vacant
- Alagoas:
  - Antônio Simeão de Lamenha Filho (until 15 March)
  - Afrânio Lages (from 15 March)
- Amazonas:
  - Danilo Duarte de Matos Areosa (until 15 March)
  - João Walter de Andrade (from 15 March)
- Bahia:
  - Luís Viana Filho (until 15 March)
  - Antônio Carlos Magalhães (from 15 March)
- Ceará:
  - Plácido Castelo (until 25 March)
  - César Cals (from 25 March)
- Espírito Santo:
  - Cristiano Dias Lopes Filho (until 15 March)
  - Artur Carlos Gerhardt Santos (from 15 March)
- Goiás:
  - Otávio Lage (until 15 March)
  - Leonino Caiado (from 15 March)
- Guanabara: Antonio de Pádua Chagas Freitas
- Maranhão:
  - Antônio Jorge Dino (until 15 March)
  - Pedro Neiva de Santana (from 15 March)
- Mato Grosso:
  - Pedro Pedrossian (until 15 March)
  - José Fragelli (from 15 March)
- Minas Gerais:
  - Israel Pinheiro da Silva (until 15 March)
  - Rondon Pacheco (from 15 March)
- Pará:
  - Alacid Nunes (until 15 March)
  - Fernando Guilhon (from 15 March)
- Paraíba:
  - João Agripino Maia (until 15 March)
  - Ernâni Sátiro (from 15 March)
- Paraná:
  - Paulo Pimentel (until 15 March)
  - Haroldo Leon Peres (15 March-23 November)
  - Pedro Viriato Parigot de Sousa (from 23 November)
- Pernambuco:
  - Nilo Coelho (until 15 March)
  - Eraldo Gueiros (from 15 March)
- Piauí:
  - João Clímaco d'Almeida (until 15 March)
  - Alberto Silva (from 15 March)
- Rio de Janeiro:
  - Geremias de Mattos Fontes (until 31 March)
  - Raimundo Padilha (from 31 March)
- Rio Grande do Norte:
  - Walfredo Gurgel Dantas (until 15 March)
  - Jose Pereira de Araújo Cortez (from 15 March)
- Rio Grande do Sul:
  - Walter Peracchi Barcelos (until 15 March)
  - Euclides Triches (from 15 March)
- Santa Catarina:
  - Ivo Silveira (until 15 March)
  - Colombo Salles (from 15 March)
- São Paulo:
  - Roberto Costa de Abreu Sodré (until 15 March)
  - Laudo Natel (from 15 March)
- Sergipe:
  - João de Andrade Garcez (until 15 March)
  - Paulo Barreto de Menezes (from 15 March)

=== Vice governors ===
- Acre: Alberto Barbosa da Costa (from 15 March)
- Alagoas:
  - Manoel Sampaio Luz (until 15 March)
  - José de Medeiros Tavares (from 15 March)
- Amazonas: Deoclides de Carvalho Leal (from 15 March)
- Bahia:
  - Jutahy Magalhães (until 15 March)
  - Menandro Minahim (from 15 March)
- Ceará:
  - Humberto Ellery (until 15 March)
  - Francisco Humberto Bezerra (from 15 March)
- Espírito Santo:
  - Isaac Lopes Rubim (until 15 March)
  - Henrique Pretti (from 15 March)
- Goiás:
  - Osires Teixeira (until 31 January)
  - Ursulino Tavares Leão (from 15 March)
- Maranhão: Alexandre Sá Colares Moreira (from 15 March)
- Mato Grosso:
  - Lenine de Campos Póvoas (until 15 March)
  - José Monteiro de Figueiredo (from 15 March)
- Minas Gerais:
  - Pio Soares Canedo (until 15 March)
  - Celso Porfírio de Araújo Machado (from 15 March)
- Pará:
  - João Renato Franco (until 15 March)
  - Newton Burlamaqui Barreira (from 15 March)
- Paraíba:
  - Antônio Juarez Farias (until 15 March)
  - Clóvis Bezerra Cavalcanti (from 15 March)
- Paraná:
  - Plínio Franco Ferreira da Costa (until 15 March)
  - Pedro Viriato Parigot de Souza (from 15 March)
- Pernambuco:
  - Salviano Machado Filho (until 15 March)
  - José Antônio Barreto Guimarães (from 15 March)
- Piauí:
  - Sebastião Rocha Leal (from 15 March)
- Rio de Janeiro:
  - Heli Ribeiro Gomes (until 15 March)
  - Teotônio Araújo (from 15 March)
- Rio Grande do Norte:
  - Clóvis Motta (until 15 March)
  - Tertius Rebelo (from 15 March)
- Rio Grande do Sul: Edmar Fetter (from 15 March)
- Santa Catarina:
  - Jorge Bornhausen (until 15 March)
  - Atílio Francisco Xavier Fontana (from 15 March)
- São Paulo:
  - Hilário Torloni (until 15 March)
  - Antonio José Rodrigues Filho (from 15 March)
- Sergipe:
  - Manoel Paulo Vasconcelos (until 15 March)
  - Adalberto Moura (from 15 March)

== Events ==
=== January ===
- 14 January: Seventy Brazilian political prisoners are released in Santiago, Chile.
- 16 January: Giovanni Enrico Bucher, the Swiss ambassador to Brazil, is released by the Ação Libertadora Nacional, 40 days after his kidnapping.

=== February ===
- February 1: Brazil leaves the meeting of the Organization of American States for failing to reach a joint plan of action against terrorism.

=== May ===
- May 19: The Ministry of Mines and Energy, Antônio Dias Leite Júnior, announces in Brasília that the American company Westinghouse Electric Company, has been chosen to build the first Brazilian nuclear power plant in Angra dos Reis.

=== July ===
- July 18: Pelé plays his last game for the Brazil national football team, in a 2–2 draw against Yugoslavia at the Maracanã Stadium, in Rio de Janeiro.

=== September ===
- September 17: Former Captain Carlos Lamarca, leader of the VPR (Vanguarda Popular Revolucionária), is killed after an ambush set up by security forces in Pintadas, Bahia.

=== November ===
- 20 November: 29 people die when a section of the Elevado Engenheiro Freyssinet, a bridge under construction, falls on traffic at an intersection in Rio de Janeiro.

=== December ===
- December 18: The Orthographic Reform of 1971 is signed into law by President Emílio Garrastazu Médici, which approves changes in the spelling of the Brazilian Portuguese language .
- Dr. Roberto Farina performs the first male-to-female gender-affirming surgery in Brazil.

== Births ==
=== January ===
- 18 January – Christian Fittipaldi, racing driver

=== February ===
- 1 February – Adriana Lessa, actress

=== April ===
- 19 April – Manoel Tobias, futsal player

=== May ===
- 24 May – Vivianne Pasmanter, actress

== Deaths ==
=== January ===
- January 11 – Zé Arigó, faith healer (b. 1921)

=== February ===
- February 18 – Jaime de Barros Câmara, archbishop (b. 1894)

== See also ==
- 1971 in Brazilian football
- 1971 in Brazilian television
