= 1974 in Brazilian television =

This is a list of Brazilian television related events from 1974.

== Events ==
- 1 February – Jornal Hoje and Jornal Nacional from TV Globo report the coverage of the Joelma building fire in the city of São Paulo, which destroyed 14 floors, and left 187 dead and more than 300 injured. The coverage is reported by the Jornal Hoje on the next day.
- 13 June – TV Globo starts the coverage of the 1974 FIFA World Cup in West Germany.
- 7 July – TV Globo ends the coverage of the 1974 FIFA World Cup in West Germany.
- 5 August – Plantão Globo, the breaking news segment of TV Globo, is initially aired in four five-minute editions and replaces the now-defunct Globo em Dois Minutos (1970).
- 25 November – Plantão Globo begins airing from Monday to Friday, only at 10:40 pm until 27 December of the same year.

== Television shows ==
=== 1970s ===
- Vila Sésamo (1972-1977, 2007–present)

== Networks and services ==
=== Conversions and rebrandings ===
Network	Type	Launch date	Notes	Source
TVE Ceará	Terrestrial	7 March		
TVE RS	Terrestrial	29 March		
TV Uruguaiana	Terrestrial	2 April		
TVE ES	Terrestrial	13 June		
TV Rondônia	Terrestrial	13 September		
TV Acre	Terrestrial	16 October		

== Births ==
- 6 July - Babi Xavier, actress, singer & TV host
- 8 August - Preta Gil, singer & actress
- 17 October - Bárbara Paz, actress & model

== See also ==
- 1974 in Brazil
