= Brazilian telenovela =

Brazilian teledramaturgy format

The Brazilian telenovela, the most popular form of soap opera produced in Brazil, has been produced and aired in the country since the 1950s. Sua Vida Me Pertence, written and directed by Walter Forster and shown on the now-defunct TV Tupi São Paulo between December 21, 1951 and February 15, 1952, was the world's first telenovela. According to Keske & Scherer, telenovelas have held the "status of the most profitable product in the Brazilian cultural industry" since the mid-1970s.

Telenovelas are often treated as "open works", as their storylines can be modified to suit the reactions of the audience. Telenovelas are broadcast on national television networks, mostly free-to-air, and their rights are frequently sold to other countries. Originally aimed at entertainment, some telenovelas have also discussed controversies and issues of social responsibility in their stories. Explode Coração, written by Glória Perez and shown on TV Globo in 1995, dealt with the disappearance of children; Chamas da Vida, written by Cristianne Fridman and shown on Record between mid-2008 and early 2009, dealt with the issue of pedophilia.

According to a 2015 study carried out by the Brazilian research firm Ibope, telenovelas are the most popular television genre in Brazil. The study also found that the genre is the favorite among audiences in Brazil, Panama, Uruguay and Paraguay. The institute based its research on audience data from 11 Latin American countries, with a universe of 135.5 million viewers.

The Ibope study also found that while telenovelas are often associated with women, the genre was the most viewed category for Brazilian men as well, surpassing even soccer for viewer popularity. Still, among telenovela viewers, women viewers outnumber men two to one. According to the report, children aged 4 to 17 watch more than twice as many telenovelas as kids' programs.

== History ==
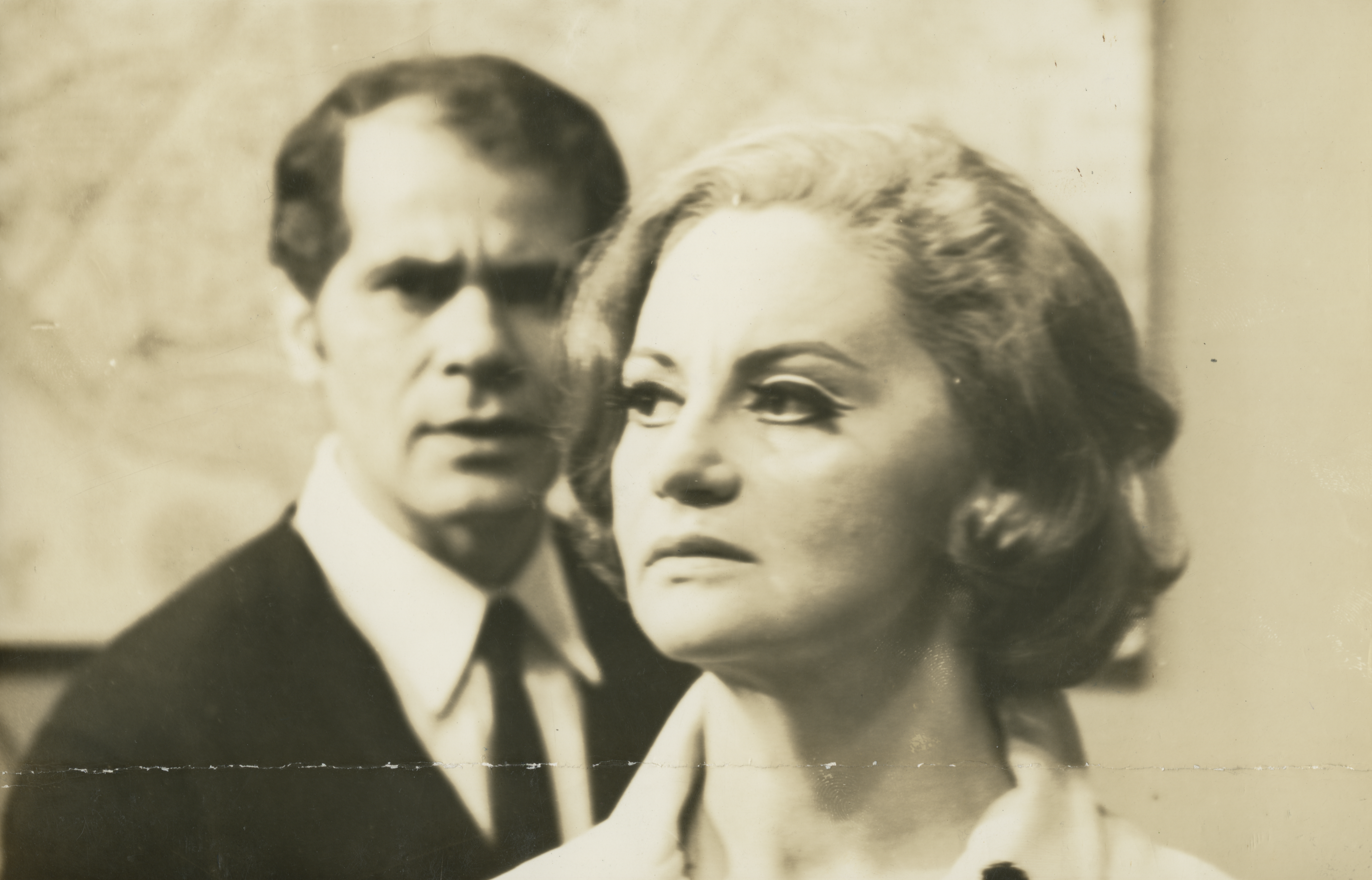
Laura Cardoso and Ivan Mesquita during a scene from the 1970 telenovela Algemas de Ouro on Record.

Sua Vida Me Pertence, the first Brazilian telenovela, was shown on TV Tupi São Paulo and written and directed by Walter Forster. It premiered on December 21, 1951 and aired until February 15, 1952. It featured 15 chapters exhibited live twice a week. Vida Alves, Lia de Aguiar, Lima Duarte, José Parisi and Dionísio de Azevedo appeared in the production. The first kiss on Brazilian television occurred in Sua Vida Me Pertence between the main characters, played by Walter Forster and Vida Alves.

In July 1963, 2-5499 Ocupado premiered on the now-defunct TV Excelsior in São Paulo. Initially, it was shown three times a week, but became daily to hold the viewer's attention. It was written by Dulce Santucci, who translated the work by Argentine writer Alberto Migré, based on the original by Abel Santa Cruz. It was the first production to show the romantic couple Glória Menezes and Tarcísio Meira, who were married in real life. It began airing daily on TV Excelsior in Rio de Janeiro on September 9, 1963.

Rede Tupi, which was inaugurated on September 18, 1950 and closed on July 16, 1980, was the first Brazilian television network and produced many successful telenovelas. Mulheres de Areia, A Viagem, A Barba-Azul, Os Inocentes and O Profeta, all written by Ivani Ribeiro, were some of Rede Tupi's biggest hits. Beto Rockfeller by Bráulio Pedroso, Ídolo de Pano and O Direito de Nascer by Teixeira Filho, Simplesmente Maria by Benjamin Cattan and Benedito Ruy Barbosa, Antônio Maria and Nino, o Italianinho by Geraldo Vietri were also among the telenovelas produced by Rede Tupi that achieved resounding success.

Escrava Isaura, written by Gilberto Braga and adapted from the homonymous novel by Bernardo Guimarães, was shown on TV Globo between October 11, 1976 and February 5, 1977. Its 100 chapters were directed by Herval Rossano and Milton Gonçalves. It was aired five times and sold to almost eighty countries. In Cuba, the government canceled electricity rationing while the telenovela was on air. Lucélia Santos, who was making her television debut, became famous for her performance as the protagonist Isaura. To this day, Leôncio is considered one of the most ruthless villains in the history of Brazilian television drama and actor Rubens de Falco's most memorable television role.

In 2004, Escrava Isaura received a remake by Record, which was a success with an average of twenty points and leadership during its exhibition. Written by Tiago Santiago, the show launched a major renovation of the station's dramaturgy, which gained popularity and recognition, and was sold to several countries. Essas Mulheres, Prova de Amor, Vidas Opostas, Cidadão Brasileiro͵ Amor e intrigas, Caminhos do Coração, Chamas da Vida, Poder Paralelo, Ribeirão do Tempo, Vidas em Jogo, Vitória and Os Dez Mandamentos, all from Record, were also successful.

Roque Santeiro, written by Dias Gomes, was originally due to premiere on August 27, 1975, as a substitute for Lauro César Muniz's hugely successful Escalada. However, on the day of the premiere, the Department of Political and Social Order (Portuguese: Departamento de Ordem Política e Social - DOPS) censored and banned the exhibition of the show. Roque Santeiro was a television adaptation of the play O Berço do Herói, which had also been censored and banned at its premiere in 1965 by the military regime. In order to fill the slot in the schedule while another telenovela was being prepared, a compact reprise of Selva de Pedra, by Janete Clair, was shown, which would later be replaced by Pecado Capital, written by the same author. Part of the cast and sets from Roque Santeiro were reused for the production of this soap opera.

After 10 years, under the Sarney government, Roque Santeiro was finally released and able to be shown. The artists involved in the original work were invited to feature in the new version of the telenovela as their respective characters. Francisco Cuoco and Betty Faria refused the lead roles of Roque Santeiro and Viúva Porcina and were replaced by José Wilker and Regina Duarte. The telenovela became one of the biggest hits in the history of Brazilian television. In its last chapter, aired on February 21, 1986, it recorded 100 rating points, the highest rating ever recorded in the history of Brazilian television.

Vale Tudo, written by Gilberto Braga, Leonor Bassères and Aguinaldo Silva, aired from May 16, 1988 to January 6, 1989 and dealt with themes such as corruption, ethics and honesty. The mystery regarding the identity of the murderer of the villain Odete Roitman (played by Beatriz Segall), considered to be one of the cruelest in the history of Brazilian television drama, caused enormous repercussions and curiosity among viewers. Five different endings were recorded, and not even the cast had access to the true ending.

TV Globo has carried reruns of its novelas during its Vale a Pena Ver de Novo ("Worth Watching Again") block. Dona Xepa, written by Gilberto Braga, was the first soap opera to be replayed. Mulheres de Areia, A Viagem, O Rei do Gado, Anjo Mau, Tieta and A Indomada recorded excellent ratings during their reruns.

== Features ==
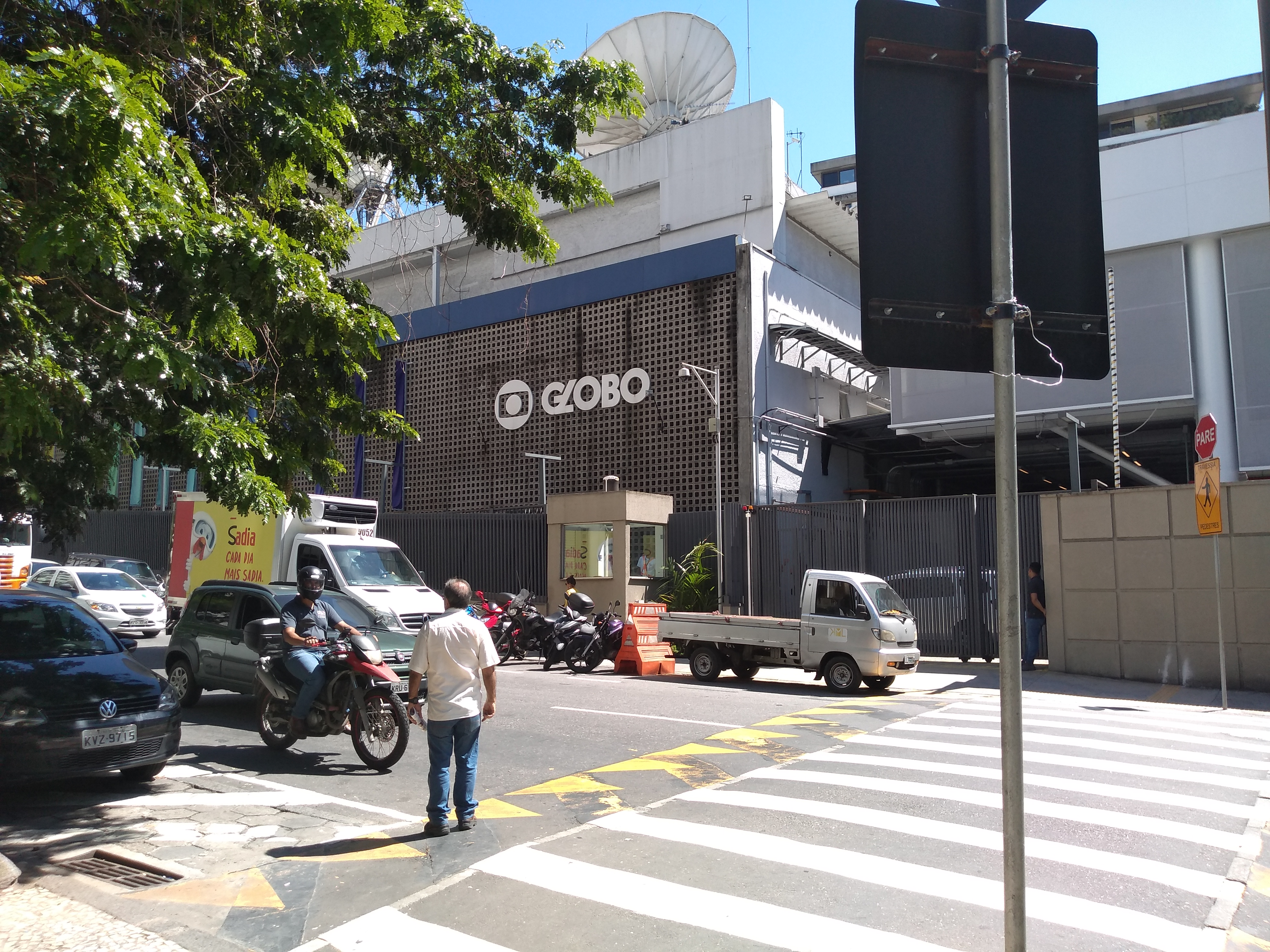
Headquarters of TV Globo, in Rio de Janeiro.

The chapters of Brazilian telenovelas usually last an average of 55 minutes a day on TV Globo and Record, 45 minutes on SBT and 1 hour on Rede Bandeirantes, which are currently the only broadcasters producing and showing telenovelas. They are presented from Monday to Saturday on TV Globo and Rede Bandeirantes and Monday to Friday on Record and SBT. Shows last about seven months, but there are exceptions, such as Irmãos Coragem, shown on TV Globo, written by Janete Clair and directed by Daniel Filho, which aired for over a year (from June 8, 1970 to June 12, 1971).

=== Production ===
The construction of a telenovela is based on its audience (the bigger the audience, the longer the show). Productions start four or five months in advance and can involve one or more authors.

=== Soundtrack ===
Telenovelas usually feature two soundtracks: one national and one international. Roque Santeiro was the first production to have a musical theme. O Rei do Gado, released in 1996, has the most successful soundtrack in the history of national TV with around 1.6 million copies sold. The national soundtrack for Mulheres Apaixonadas was the last to win a diamond record with more than 1 million copies sold.

== Brazilian telenovelas abroad ==
Due to exports, the telenovela has become the most profitable product of the Brazilian cultural industry. The first production shown outside Brazil was O Bem-Amado, released in 1973. The best-selling Brazilian telenovela is Avenida Brasil, which was exported to 150 countries. TV Globo is the leader in the international market, earning around US$150 million a year from the sale of telenovelas abroad.

=== Best-selling Brazilian telenovelas abroad ===
Position	Telenovela	Year	Author	Director	Countries
1	Avenida Brasil	2012	João Emanuel Carneiro	Ricardo Waddington, Amora Mautner and José Luiz Villamarim	150
2	Totalmente Demais	2016	Rosane Svartman and Paulo Halm	Luiz Henrique Rios	135
3	A Vida da Gente	2011-2012	Lícia Manzo	Jayme Monjardim	132
4	Caminho das Índias	2009	Gloria Perez	Marcos Schechtman	117
5	Da Cor do Pecado	2004	João Emanuel Carneiro	Denise Saraceni	107
5	O Clone	2001	Gloria Perez	Jayme Monjardim and Marcos Schechtman	107
6	Escrava Isaura	1976-1977	Gilberto Braga	Herval Rossano and Milton Gonçalves	104
7	Insensato Coração	2011	Gilberto Braga and Ricardo Linhares	Dennis Carvalho	100
8	Passione	2010	Sílvio de Abreu	Denise Saraceni	91
9	Império	2014	Aguinaldo Silva	Rogério Gomes	88
10	Laços de Família	2000	Manoel Carlos	Ricardo Waddington	86

== See also ==
- Telenovela
- TV Globo telenovelas
- Philippine television drama
- List of Brazilian telenovelas
