= Desconhecido =

Desconhecido is a Portuguese word meaning unknown or stranger. It may refer to:

- O Desconhecido, a 1964 film with actor Fernando Torres
- O Desconhecido, a Brazilian RecordTV telenovela
- Tomb of the Unknown Soldier (Portugal), a monument (Portuguese: Túmulo do Soldado Desconhecido)
