= Emiliano Queiroz =

Brazilian actor and radio personality (1936–2024)

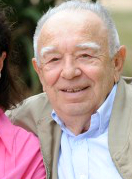
- Queiroz in 2012
- Born: 1 January 1936; Aracati, Ceará, Brazil
- Died: 4 October 2024 (aged 88); Rio de Janeiro, Brazil
- Occupations: Actor; radio personality; screenwriter; director
- Years active: 1950–2024
- Spouse: Maria Letícia (m. 1973)
- Children: 14

Emiliano de Guimarães Queiroz (1 January 1936 – 4 October 2024) was a Brazilian actor, radio personality, screenwriter and director.

== Life and career ==
Queiroz was born in Aracati, in the state of Ceara, into a family of Portuguese-Dutch descent; When he was four years old, his father took him to see The Martyr of Golgotha, a play by Enrique Pérez Escrich, awakening his vocation. When he was ten years old, his family moved to Fortaleza. Deciding to pursue an artistic career, at the age of fourteen he joined the Teatro Experimental de Arte, an important company in Ceará. Shortly afterwards, he started working at Ceará Rádio Clube. At seventeen, he hitched a ride in a truck and went to São Paulo, where he played small roles in plays such as O Pagador de Promessas, by Dias Gomes, at the Teatro Brasileiro de Comédia (TBC). Three years later, he returned to Fortaleza, where he worked for two years as an actor, comedian, program presenter, producer, set designer and stage manager on TV Ceará.

He was part of the first graduating class of the Dramatic Arts course at the Federal University of Ceará (UFC).

From 1964 onwards, Emiliano participated in several telenovelas, miniseries and films.

On film, he acted in Independência ou Morte (1972), directed by Carlos Coimbra; O Grande Mentecapto (1989) and Tiradentes (1999), in the role of poet Cláudio Manuel da Costa, both directed by Oswaldo Caldeira; O Xangô de Baker Street (2001), directed by Miguel Faria Júnior; Madame Satã (2002), directed by Karim Aïnouz; Casa de Areia (2005), directed by Andrucha Waddington, among others. He won the Golden Kikito for Best Supporting Actor at the Gramado Festival for a three-minute appearance in the film Stelinha (1990), by Miguel Faria Jr.

On television, he was one of the pioneers who opened TV Ceará, then worked at TV Cultura and TV Paulista, until arriving at Rede Globo, where he was invited by Glória Magadan to write Anastácia, a Mulher sem Destino. Among the telenovelas in which he participated, there are: O Bem-Amado, both in the 1973 and in the 1980 series versions, where he became notable with the character Dirceu Borboleta; Pai Herói (1979); Cambalacho (1986); As Filhas da Mãe (2001); Senhora do Destino (2004), among others. In 2014 he played Padre Santo in Meu Pedacinho de Chão.

The actor also had significant participation in miniseries such as Tenda dos Milagres (1985), by Aguinaldo Silva and Regina Braga, based on the work of Jorge Amado; Abolição (1988), by Wilson Aguiar Filho and Walter Avancini; Tereza Batista (1992), by Vicente Sesso, based on the novel by Jorge Amado; Um Só Coração (2004), by Maria Adelaide Amaral and Alcides Nogueira; and Hoje é Dia de Maria (2005), by Luís Alberto de Abreu, as the devil Asmodeus. In Cinquentinha (2009) and its derivative series, Lara com Z (2011), both by Aguinaldo Silva, he played the butler Sebastião Batista. In 2014, the actor played Alfredinho in the series Doce de Mãe.

On stage, his notable roles include Geni in “Ópera do Malandro” (from 1979, by Chico Buarque), Veludo in A Navalha na Carne (1969), by Plínio Marcos, and Tonho, in Dois Perdidos numa Noite Suja (1971), also by Plínio Marcos.

=== Illness and death ===
In late September 2024, Queiroz was hospitalized at the São Vicente da Gávea Clinic in Rio de Janeiro and had three stents inserted into his heart. He was discharged on 3 October, but was readmitted by ambulance the following morning after experiencing sickness. He suffered a cardiac arrest in the emergency room and was resuscitated, but later died. He was 88.
