= Cidadão Brasileiro =

Brazilian telenovela

- Genre: Telenovela
- Created by: Lauro César Muniz
- Written by: Dora Castellar; Rosane Lima
- Directed by: Flávio Colatrello Jr.
- Starring: List: Gabriel Braga Nunes Lucélia Santos Paloma Duarte Carla Regina Floriano Peixoto Luíza Tomé Tuca Andrada Leonardo Brício Mônica Carvalho Taumaturgo Ferreira Petrônio Gontijo Gracindo Júnior Maytê Piragibe Bruno Ferrari Cleyde Yáconis
- Opening theme: "Ponteio" by Edu Lobo and Zizi Possi
- Country of origin: Brazil
- No. of episodes: 213

Original release
- Network: Record
- Release: March 13 – November 20, 2006

Cidadão Brasileiro is a 213-chapter Brazilian telenovela produced and aired by Record between March 13 and November 20, 2006, which replaced the news slot and was replaced by Vidas Opostas. It was written by Lauro César Muniz with the collaboration of Rosane Lima and Dora Castellar, and directed by Flávio Colatrello Jr, Fábio Junqueira, João Camargo, Ivan Zettel and Henrique Martins. It was the 4th telenovela aired by Record since 2004. It is also responsible for inaugurating the second telenovela slot on the channel, airing simultaneously with Prova de Amor. After premiering at 8:30 pm, Cidadão Brasileiro was transferred to 10 pm in the third month.

The title of the telenovela is a reference to the protagonist Antônio Maciel, an "ambiguous hero who oscillates between his professional dream and the temptation of easy money", according to Muniz. Journalist Marcelo Marthe from Veja magazine identified the conflict between honesty and corruption in Antônio. Both the ambiguity of the characters and the absence of most of the typical clichés of the genre are the main characteristics of the plot, which had its script highly praised by the press.

It features Gabriel Braga Nunes, Lucélia Santos, Paloma Duarte, Carla Regina, Floriano Peixoto, Luíza Tomé, Tuca Andrada and Leonardo Brício in the lead roles.

== Background ==
At Globo, Lauro César Muniz was responsible for very successful telenovelas, such as Escalada, Roda de Fogo and O Salvador da Pátria. However, after Zazá aired in 1997, only two of his works were produced: the miniseries Chiquinha Gonzaga and Aquarela do Brasil, in 1999 and 2000 respectively. Since then, every synopsis he presented to Globo's Teledramaturgy Department was rejected or shelved, as the company wanted to "make soap operas along Mexican lines in order to export more". Globo also tried to offer Muniz the production of A Imperatriz do Café, whose rights had been acquired by actress Regina Duarte. However, in April 2005, he was attracted by Record's proposal, which included greater freedom to produce his projects. When he was hired, he submitted three synopses: two contemporary plots and a reinterpretation of a previous production he had written.

== Production ==
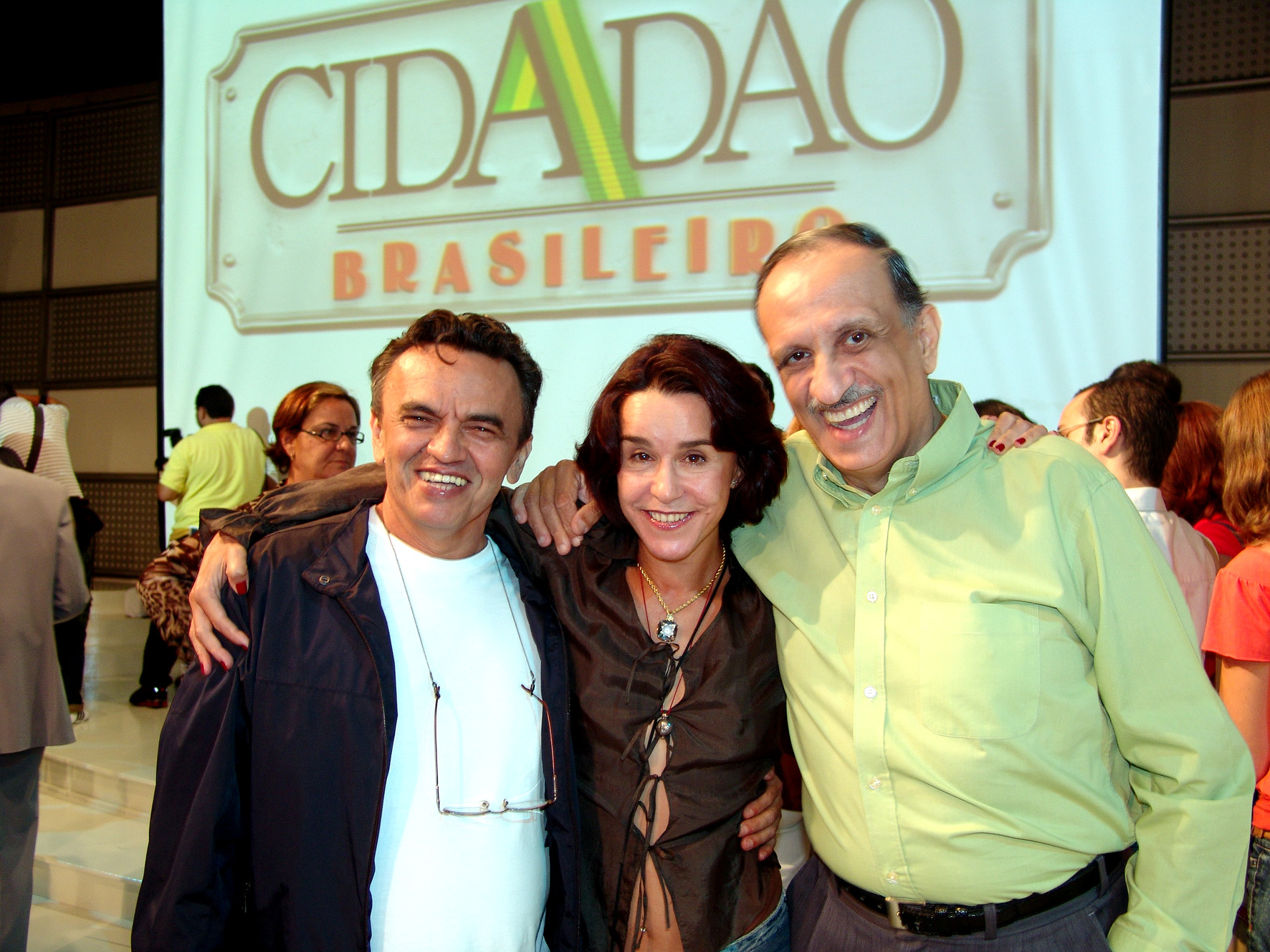
Actors José Dumont, Lucélia Santos and Bemvindo Sequeira in front of the Cidadão Brasileiro logo.

With Cidadão Brasileiro, Record inaugurated a second national telenovela slot, after Prova de Amor proved successful. Elements of three telenovelas written by Lauro César Muniz (Escalada, O Casarão and Quarenta Anos Depois) are represented in Cidadão Brasileiro. According to him, the aim is to "rescue" the ideals disseminated in the 1970s, when "the truly Brazilian telenovela" was implemented. Although they share similar themes, in Cidadão Brasileiro, Muniz sought to "have the same concern for inserting the character into a political and social universe". The protagonist's name is a combination of the characters Antônio Dias (Tarcísio Meira in Escalada) and João Maciel (Paulo Gracindo in O Casarão).

Muniz's father's life served as the basis for the telenovela's plot, just as in Escalada. In the first phase, Antônio gets rich from cotton production and becomes the owner of the movie theater, until he loses everything, just as Muniz's father did.

=== Casting ===
The role of Fausta was initially offered to actress Sônia Braga, who showed interest in the character but did not reach an agreement with Record. Later, it was offered to Bruna Lombardi, whose hiring was described as "practically a done deal." Hiring proposals, both for actors and members of the technical team, were kept secret to avoid inflating the market. The first actor to be officially announced as part of the cast was Gabriel Braga Nunes, in October 2005. By the end of the following month, Tuca Andrada, Paloma Duarte and Francisca Queiroz were hired. At the end of the year, Lucélia Santos was confirmed for the role of Fausta. The hiring of Floriano Peixoto, who would play Atílio, the main rival of the protagonist in the plot, was confirmed on January 8, 2006, a few days before filming began.

Hiring the technical team caused considerable difficulty for the production. Both Jayme Monjardim and Ignácio Coqueiro were invited to take over the direction of the telenovela, but Flávio Colatrello eventually won the role.

=== Scenic city ===
At the time, Record already had RecNov, a studio for the production of telenovelas. However, the structure was not completely defined. In 2005, the site, which was only capable of filming one production, was already busy filming Prova de Amor, and the renovations would not be completed in time to start filming the new production, planned for October. Consequently, a 10,000-square-meter plot of land was rented to become a fictional construction site to portray the building of Brasília. The outdoor scenes were shot in a scenic city built in Bragança Paulista to represent a fictionalized version of the municipality of Guará, and the studio scenes at Record's headquarters in São Paulo.

=== Recordings ===
Filming began in January 2006. Two months into the telenovela, director Flávio Colatrello Jr. left Cidadão Brasileiro due to a conflict of ideas with the broadcaster and with Muniz, who said:

Cidadão Brasileiro has an exceptional cast. It deserves everyone's affection, from those who write and those who direct. Unfortunately, until recently, the number of chapters was small because of the March rains and excessive locations. There was an absurd loss of quality in the direction. I've reduced the number of locations and we've made more progress. Therefore, we expect a result more in line with the quality of our squad.

Before Colatrello's departure, conflicts were reported for different reasons, such as the lighting used, his behavior during filming and the method that would be used to age the characters during the second phase of the production. After his resignation, João Camargo was invited to join the directing team, and Fábio Junqueira and Ivan Zettel had their duties increased. Later, Camargo was reassigned to the production team of the telenovela Alta Estação and replaced by actor and director Henrique Martins.

The death of the character Eleni, played by Maytê Piragibe, was recorded to match the start of filming for the substitute telenovela, Vidas Opostas, in which she would play the protagonist. The last chapter of Cidadão Brasileiro aired on November 20, with the replacement premiering the following day. The telenovela was the last work of actor Jece Valadão, who died a few days after the end of the show.

== Storyline ==
Cidadão Brasileiro tells the story of a man from his youth in the 1950s to his old age at the beginning of the 21st century. Born in 1928, the protagonist Antônio Maciel (Gabriel Braga Nunes) is a determined man on a difficult journey of social progress, with his professional achievements and failures and his conflicts in love, which involve three women of opposite temperaments and social levels. There are two phases: the first describes Antônio's professional beginnings in Guará and in the construction of Brasilia, covering the 1950s and 1960s, and the second addresses the period of the military dictatorship in the 1970s. In an epilogue, set in 2006, the elderly Antônio revisits his career.

=== First phase: Rise ===
The plot begins when Antônio Maciel, an agricultural salesman, is robbed by Fausta (Lucélia Santos), a woman who seduces him and takes all the money he had received and was supposed to give to his boss. Unemployed and in debt, Antônio chases Fausta until he reaches the town of Guará, in the interior of São Paulo. She plans to run a scam on Atílio (Floriano Peixoto), the city's main landowner and political leader, posing as a representative of the federal government who will help him in his election campaign. Antônio, aware of Fausta's profiteering nature, takes revenge and uses her to achieve a rapid rise in the city. Soon he stands out, makes good relationships and meets two women: Carolina (Carla Regina), a simple farm girl, and Luíza (Paloma Duarte), a sophisticated and well-educated girl from São Paulo.

In Guará, Antônio also meets Homero (Tuca Andrada), a serious journalist, owner of the newspaper Voz da Liberdade and of firm progressive convictions, who, initially a member of the Communist Party, begins to confront the other party members because he disagrees with certain positions. Antônio and Atílio become rivals. Antônio focuses on cotton production in Guará and the investment proves successful. After becoming rich, he buys and refurbishes the city's cinema, where some of the greatest artists perform. Antônio is elected mayor, beating Atílio. However, the fall in cotton prices destabilizes Antônio financially. He loses everything and is forced to leave the city.

Married to Carolina, he leaves for São Paulo to restart. Luíza was unable to face the difficulties and left him to marry Camilo (Taumaturgo Ferreira), a stable businessman. In the mid-1950s, Brasilia begins to be built and Antônio goes to the Central Plateau to participate in the project, working for Edouard Girard (Gilbert Stein), owner of the construction company Obradec. Antônio becomes more distant from Carolina and, while their marriage fails, he achieves a more stable financial position.

=== Second phase: 1968 onwards ===
Once Brasília is inaugurated, Antônio returns to São Paulo and meets Fausta, spouse of a millionaire on the verge of death. Fausta introduces him to Otávio (Luís Carlos Miéle) and Manuela Gama (Françoise Forton). After Otávio's death, Fausta convinces Manuela to hand over the management of the business to Antônio. He acquires the power, but loses his freedom as he becomes manipulated by Fausta. Years after their affair, Antônio decides to win Luiza back. Homero gets involved in politics again and runs for federal office. Marcelo (Bruno Ferrari) and Tereza's relationship ends after Eleni (Maytê Piragibe) dies. Tereza (Luiza Tomé) gets involved in the fight against the military dictatorship, becomes a militant and takes part in the Angolan War of Independence, fighting for the People's Movement for the Liberation of Angola, where she dies. Marcelo, after the relationship ends, continues his career as a lawyer.

=== Epilogue: 2006 ===
In the last chapter, Antônio, at the age of 80, lives in Guará with Luiza and reviews his life. He bought the construction company Obradec, became rich and bought the land where he lived in Guará: Fazenda do Casarão, which belonged to Luísa's family, and Fazenda das Águas, which belonged to Carolina's father. Luiza's daughter, Dóris (Thaís Sima), starts studying in São Paulo and gets closer to her mother. While Fausta ends up alone and bankrupt, Atílio, despite also facing financial problems, manages to resume his marriage after moving from Guará to São Paulo and selling his properties to Antônio.

== Cast ==
Character	Portrayed by
Antônio Maciel	Gabriel Braga Nunes
Luíza Sales Jordão	Paloma Duarte
Carolinha Castanho	Carla Regina
Fausta Gama / Faustina	Lucélia Santos
Atílio Sales Jordão	Floriano Peixoto
Homero Silva Lopes	Tuca Andrada
Marcelo Sales Jordão	Bruno Ferrari
Tereza Gava	Luiza Tomé
Celso Castanho	Leonardo Brício
Maura Flores Castanho	Mônica Carvalho
Camilo Góes	Taumaturgo Ferreira
Nestor Castanho	Gracindo Júnior
Eleni Gava	Maytê Piragibe
Joana Sales Jordão	Cleyde Yáconis
Júlio Sales Jordão	Cecil Thiré
Cleonice Sales Jordão	Bárbara Bruno
Dadá	Léa Garcia
Alfredo	Bemvindo Sequeira
Alcides	José Dumont
Laís Sales Jordão	Fernanda Muniz
Edouard Girard	Gilbert Stein
Renée Girard	Danni Carlos
Manuela Gama	Françoise Forton
Otávio Gama	Luís Carlos Miele
Victor Temisoft	Jayme Periard
Carmem	Adriana Londoño
Julieta Dias	Vanessa Goulart
Nilo Ramos	Thiago Chagas
Tião	Ivan de Almeida
Tatiana Pereira	Fernanda Nobre
Bruna Mantovani	Karina Bacchi
Lívia Pereira	Luiza Curvo
Laércio Rocha	Kito Junqueira
Américo Pereira	Milhem Cortaz
Mariazinha	Etty Fraser
Maria	Sônia Guedes
Gasosa	André Valli
Agnaldo	Gustavo Haddad
Cristina	Camila Guebur
Toc Toc	Xando Graça
Josefa Rocha (Zezé)	Suzana Alves
Dr. Cássio	Blota Filho
Walter	Mário César Camargo
Cláudia	Ticiane Pinheiro
Delegate Décio Leão	Valter Santos
Sala	Ricardo Vasconcelos
Ernani	Walley Waetge
Caio	Gabriel Gracindo
Nurse Sônia	Dani Bavoso
Dóris Sales Jordão Góes	Ana Clara Duarte
Antônio Castanho Maciel	Rafael Formenton

=== Special guests ===
Character	Portrayed by
Emílio Castanho	Rubens Caribé
Gustavo Gama	Alexandre Barros
Daniel	Gustavo Rodrigues
Senator Duarte Costa	Jece Valadão
João	José Roberto Jardim
Vavá	Rafael Primot
Henrique	Maurício Machado
Beto	Fernando Sampaio
Pereira	Marcos Cezana
Irineu	José Ornellas
Toninho (adult)	Gabriel Mota
Dóris (adult)	Thaís Sima

== Exhibition ==
Initially scheduled to be shown at 10pm, Cidadão Brasileiro premiered at 8:30pm. During the second month, it was transferred to 10pm to escape the competition from Globo's soap operas and became established. The show was responsible for inaugurating Record's second telenovela slot.

=== Reruns ===
Cidadão Brasileiro was rebroadcast for the first time from April 9, 2014, to January 27, 2015, in 213 chapters at 5:15 pm by RFTV, which belongs to Grupo Record, replacing Essas Mulheres. The same channel aired it for the second time from March 9, 2020, to January 8, 2021, in 220 chapters at 2 pm, replacing Marcas da Paixão. It aired for the third time from May 3, 2021, to March 4, 2022, in 211 chapters at 7:30 pm, replacing Vidas Cruzadas and being replaced by Os Dez Mandamentos.

== Music ==
Cidadão Brasileiro

Soundtrack album by Compilation album
- Released: 2006
- Genre: MPB, samba and romantic music
- Length: 62:28
- Language: Portuguese and English
- Label: EMI

The CD with the telenovela soundtrack was released containing the following songs:

No.	Title	Music	Length
1.	"Ponteio"	Edu Lobo and Zizi Possi	3:00
2.	"A Vida do Viajante"	Chico Buarque and Dominguinhos	4:11
3.	"Love Me Tender"	Paulo Ricardo	3:17
4.	"Bésame Mucho"	Leila Pinheiro	4:44
5.	"Você Não Me Ensinou a Te Esquecer"	Altemar Dutra Júnior	5:21
6.	"Noites Cariocas"	A Cor do Som	4:48
7.	"Only You"	Luciana Mello	3:24
8.	"Jailhouse Rock"	Jerry Adriani	2:44
9.	"Majestade, o Sabiá"	Jair Rodrigues	3:54
10.	"Sertaneja"	Renato Teixeira	3:43
11.	"Nada Além"	Beth Carvalho	3:29
12.	"Pedacinhos do Céu"	César Camargo Mariano	4:03
13.	"Tutti-Frutti"	Léo Jaime	02:03
14.	"Luna Rossa"	Mafalda Minnozzi	4:44
15.	"Smile"	Symphonic arrangement and J. Neto	09:13
Total length:			62:28

== Release and repercussions ==
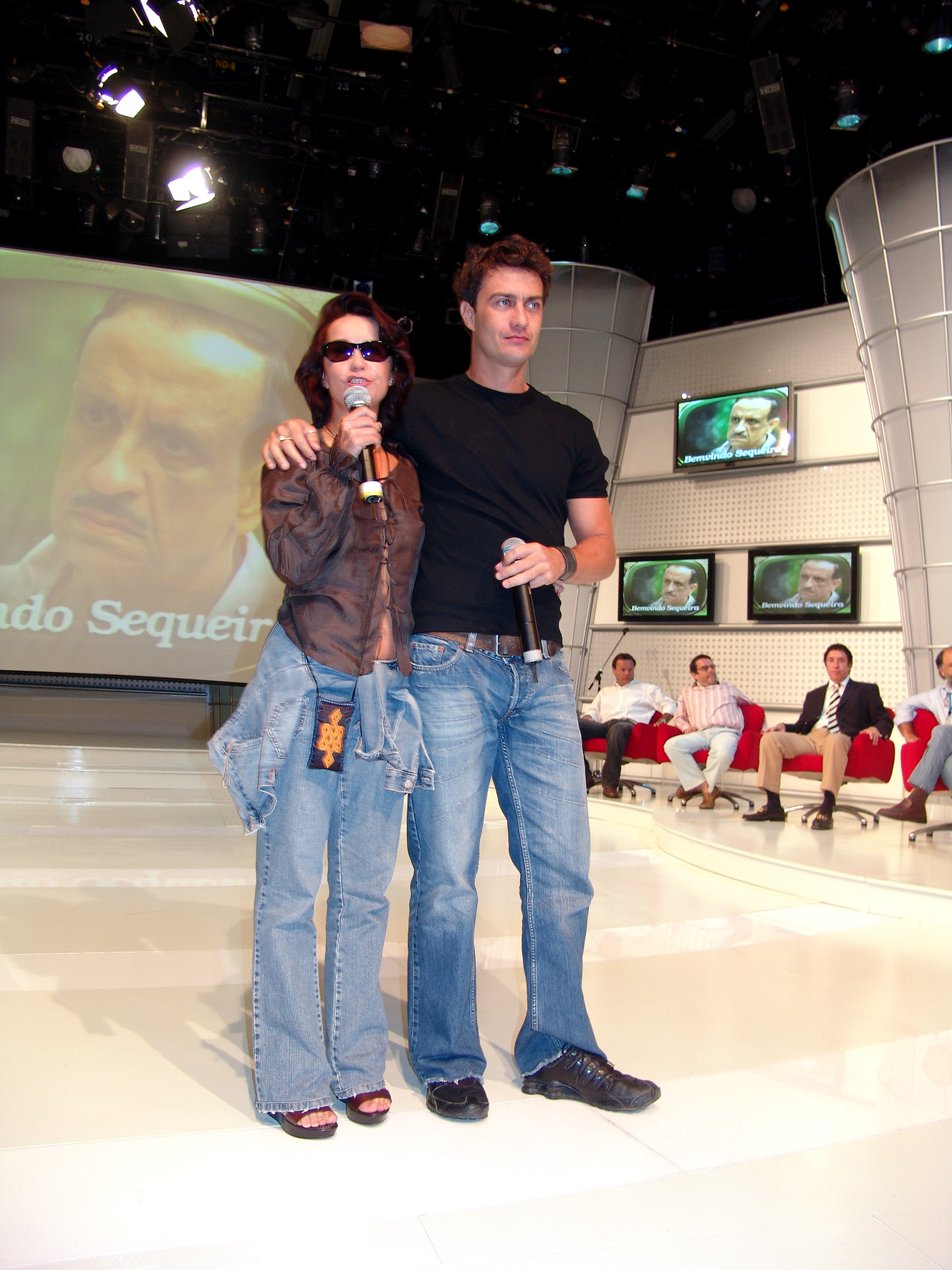
Lucélia Santos and Gabriel Braga Nunes at the launch of Cidadão Brasileiro, in March 2006.

After the first chapter of Cidadão Brasileiro was shown, Folha de S. Paulo analyzed the premiere: "Something missing from 'Cidadão Brasileiro' is the ambition of the story and the very clear intention, through the protagonist Antônio, to provide an interpretation of the national issues of the last 50 years. The hero represents the subject in the struggle for social ascension in a country refractory to any construction project that lasts long enough to come to fruition. It all seems very interesting, but perhaps there is no longer a place in soap operas for a story that requires such dedication. Not because of the audience's bad attitude (or unwillingness), but because perhaps the model has simply run out of steam.^{"}

At the premiere, journalist Patrícia Kogut said that the production was "a pleasant telenovela, without any sparkle", compared to what had been produced. Judging the premiere as "disappointing", she said: "It was similar to a lot of what we've seen on television, a soap opera that resembled old soap operas, without the brilliance of novelty or the step forward of overproduction. (...) Globo does much better, see the premiere of Sinhá Moça, yesterday too. You can't evaluate television by saying that a product is good based on the broadcaster that produces it. It would be more interesting if Record invested in creating its own language. It wouldn't fall into comparative competition, because it would be treading an authorial path. Gabriel Braga Nunes is a great actor, but he carried the chapter almost single-handedly."

Leila Reis, from the newspaper O Estado de S. Paulo, evaluated the premiere positively and pointed out that it showed "how big the gap is between Globo and the others". Highlighting "the women's heavy make-up" and the poor "quality of the image seen on the video" as some of the production's negative aspects, she praised the quality of the soundtrack, the cast and the scenery: "The outdoor locations are good, well cared for, and the composition of the period - sets and costumes - is well done".

=== Audience and sexualization of the characters ===
In the premiere, Cidadão Brasileiro scored 15 points in the Brazilian Institute of Public Opinion and Statistics (IBOPE) measurement, making it the second highest audience in the time slot during the period. It reached 23 points during parts of the broadcast. The chapters of the same week scored 13 points. Throughout the entire broadcast, the telenovela maintained an average of 12 points.

In March 2006, journalist Amelia Gonzalez pointed out that the performance of actress Carla Regina, who tried to "force the image of a seductive and naive young woman", was caricatured in some moments. The conversation between Celso and his family was seen as malicious and surprising by Istoé Gente magazine. Later, a dialog between Antônio and Luiza implied that he had a large penis. The conversation received considerable media attention. Muniz said: "There's no double entendre, but I'm careful to avoid crude phrases. I often want to express myself about sex and delicate subjects for the time the soap opera airs". The constant presence of eroticized dialogues was highlighted by reports in the Folha de S. Paulo newspaper and the Istoé Gente and Veja magazines.

In the first chapters, besides Luiza, Antônio became involved with Fausta and Carolina. The increasingly common presence of eroticized scenes attracted attention, especially since Record is a television station linked to the Universal Church of the Kingdom of God. According to Folha de S. Paulo, "Luiza and Antônio are not even official boyfriend and girlfriend. And sex, in such a relationship, is forbidden by the evangelicals of the Universal Church (as it is by Catholics)". It also differed from Prova de Amor, where there was no eroticism, with the lead couples simply kissing or embracing in romantic situations. Tiago Santiago, author of Prova de Amor, argued that his experience showed him "what can and can't be shown in this time slot", which is why he paid "constant attention" to what was shown, trying to produce a telenovela that the whole family could watch, while Muniz argued that he had complete freedom to write the plot, and that "latent sensuality" was "a hallmark" of his work.

=== Themes addressed ===
Taíssa Stivanin, from the newspaper O Estado de S. Paulo, commented that Cidadão Brasileiro "showed that the investment made in the area of teledramaturgy [by Record] puts the broadcaster close to Globo's level" and explained that "it's still early to conclude about the soap opera's performance, but it premiered with stories and conflicts well tied up by author Lauro César Muniz. Synchronism is hard to see."

Most of the praise went to the character Antônio. Stivanin described him as "quite a character. In the style of Muniz, a protagonist-antagonist, who acts between right and wrong". Journalist Laura Mattos described Antônio as a "daring" character, as he was "far removed from the cliché of the good guy". Bia Abramo pointed out that the story was very ambitious and said that "the possibility of the soap opera offering an imaginary space for the construction of a national identity may have narrowed, become desolate and been transferred to paradidactic miniseries." Despite this caveat, Antônio's assessment was positive: "The hero, ambiguous as is appropriate these days, is cut out to represent the subject in the struggle for social ascension in a country refractory to any construction project that lasts long enough to come to fruition."

After the end of production, Dirceu Alves Jr., in a review published by Istoé Gente magazine, said that the production was "ambitious" and "bold" and that "a great cast, a script full of intertextuality by the great Lauro César Muniz and Record's investment to establish itself in teledramaturgy conspired to make Cidadão Brasileiro an outstanding soap opera". According to him, the episodes of the second phase presented a "realistic approach to the dictatorship", but no longer featured the protagonist involved in an exciting plot. Simone Mousse, from the newspaper O Globo, commented that "Cidadão Brasileiro seeks to take stock of Brazil's history through its characters". Marcelo Marthe, from Veja magazine, saw the characters as "an allegory of national dilemmas".

== See also ==
- List of Brazilian telenovelas
