= Bemvindo Sequeira =

Brazilian actor and director

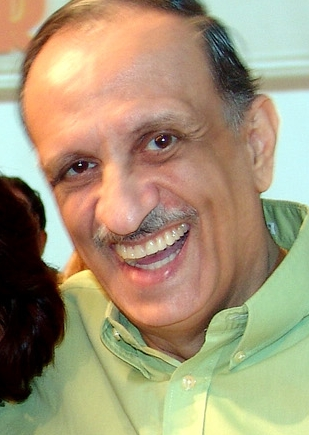
- Bemvindo Sequeira in 2006
- Born: Bemvindo Sequeira; 27 July 1947 (age 77); Carangola, Minas Gerais, Brazil
- Occupation(s): Actor, comedian, author, theater, film and television director
- Years active: 1966–present

Bemvindo Sequeira (born July 27, 1947) is a Brazilian actor, comedian, author, theater, and television director.

== Filmography ==
=== Television ===
Year	Title	Character	Notas	Emissora
1989	Tieta	Bafo de Bode / Possidônio Antunes		Rede Globo
1991	Felicidade	Delegado Noronha	Participação especial	Rede Globo
1991	Estados Anysios de Chico City	Vários personagens		Rede Globo
1992	Anos Rebeldes	Xavier		Rede Globo
1992–93	Escolinha do Professor Raimundo	Brasilino Roxo / Airton Piquet Cumbica		Rede Globo
1994	74.5: Uma Onda no Ar	Daniel	Rede Manchete	Rede Globo
1995	Tocaia Grande	Lupicínio	Rede Manchete	Rede Globo
1997	Mandacaru	Zebedeu	Rede Manchete	Rede Globo
1999	Escolinha do Barulho	Professor Benvindo Siqueira		RecordTV
1999	Você Decide	Baiacu	Episódio: "A Filha de Maria"	Rede Globo
2000	Uga Uga	Fazendeiro	Participação especial	Rede Globo
2003	Kubanacan	Juanito		Rede Globo
2006	Tecendo o Saber	Seu Celestino		Rede Globo
2006	Cidadão Brasileiro	Alfredo Dias		RecordTV
2007	Luz do Sol	Juarez Macedo		RecordTV
2009	Poder Paralelo	Vitor Danesi		RecordTV
2009	Bela, a Feia	Clemente Palhares		RecordTV
2012	Máscaras	Novais		RecordTV
2013	Dona Xepa	Dorivaldo Nogueira		RecordTV
2013	Pecado Mortal	Tufik Abdala		RecordTV
2013	Uma Noite de Arrepiar	Macedônio Paranhos	Especial de Fim de Ano	RecordTV
2014	Milagres de Jesus	Emaré	Episódio: "A Mulher Encurvada"	RecordTV
2014	Plano Alto	Frederico Leão		RecordTV
2015	Os Dez Mandamentos	Baruk		RecordTV
2016	Vai Que Cola	Arnaldo	Episódio: "Gaiola das Loucas"	Multishow
2016	Me Chama de Bruna	Humberto		FOX Brasil
2017	Belaventura	Páris La Rosie, Conde de Siena		RecordTV
2018	Jesus	Zacarias de Jerusalém		RecordTV
2019	Topíssima	Adolfo Constantino (Canarinho)		RecordTV

=== Cine ===
Ano	Título	Personagem
1977	Antônio Conselheiro e a Guerra dos Pelados	—
1979	Joana Angélica	Soldado
1988	O Diabo na Cama	—
2001	Amores Possíveis	Bilheteiro
2004	Irmãos de Fé	Judeu 2
2006	Acredite, um Espírito Baixou em Mim	Norberto
2014	Sobrevivente Urbano	Chefe
2015	Até que a Sorte nos Separe 3: A Falência Final	Nestor Cerveró
2017	Real - O Plano Por Trás da História	Itamar Franco

=== teatro ===
ano	título	personagem
2018	O fantasma autoral	
