= 1965 in Brazil =

Events in the year 1965 in Brazil.

== Incumbents ==
=== Federal government ===
- President: Marshal Castelo Branco
- Vice President: José Maria Alkmin

=== Governors ===
- Acre: Vacant
- Alagoas: Luis Cavalcante
- Amazonas: Artur César Ferreira Reis
- Bahia: Lomanto Júnior
- Ceará: Virgilio Távora
- Espírito Santo: Francisco Lacerda de Aguiar
- Goiás:
  - Carlos de Meira Mattos (until 23 January)
  - Emílio Rodrigues Ribas Jr (from 23 January)
- Guanabara:
  - Carlos Lacerda (until 11 October)
  - Raphael de Almeida Magalhães (11 October–5 December)
  - Francisco Negrão de Lima (from 5 December)
- Maranhão: Newton de Barros Belo
- Mato Grosso: Fernando Corrêa da Costa
- Minas Gerais: José de Magalhães Pinto
- Pará: Jarbas Passarinho
- Paraíba: Pedro Gondim
- Paraná:
  - Ney Braga (until 17 November)
  - Antônio Ferreira Rüppel (17 November-20 November)
  - Algacir Guimarães (from 20 November)
- Pernambuco: Paulo Pessoa Guerra
- Piauí: Petrônio Portella
- Rio de Janeiro: Pablo Torres
- Rio Grande do Norte: Aluízio Alves
- Rio Grande do Sul: Ildo Meneghetti
- Santa Catarina: Celso Ramos
- São Paulo: Ademar de Barros
- Sergipe: Celso Carvalho

=== Vice governors ===
- Alagoas: Teotônio Brandão Vilela
- Bahia: Orlando Moscoso
- Ceará: Joaquim de Figueiredo Correia
- Espírito Santo: Rubens Rangel
- Goiás: Vacant
- Maranhão: Alfredo Salim Duailibe
- Mato Grosso: Jose Garcia Nieto
- Minas Gerais: Clóvis Salgado da Gama
- Pará: Agostinho de Meneses de Monteiro
- Paraíba: André Avelino de Paiva Gadelha
- Paraná:
  - Afonso Alves de Camargo Neto (until 17 November)
  - Vacant (17 November-20 November)
  - Alípio Ayres de Carvalho (from 20 November)
- Pernambuco: Vacant
- Piauí: João Clímaco d'Almeida
- Rio de Janeiro: Teotônio Araújo
- Rio Grande do Norte: Teodorico Bezerra
- Santa Catarina: Armindo Marcílio Doutel de Andrade
- São Paulo: Laudo Natel
- Sergipe: Vacant

== Events ==
=== March ===
- 27 March: Presidents Castelo Branco of Brazil and Alfredo Stroessner of Paraguay inaugurate the Friendship Bridge over the Paraná River, which connects the two countries.
- 31 March: Pico da Neblina, the highest mountain in Brazil (9,827 ft), is climbed for the first time.

=== April ===
- 8 April: The National Congress approves the amendment of direct elections in eleven Brazilian states.
- 26 April: Rede Globo is launched in Rio de Janeiro. It is the largest television network in the country today.

=== October ===
- 3 October: Direct elections for mayors, governors and senators are held in eleven states.
- 27 October: President Humberto Castelo Branco issues Institutional Act Number Two (AI-2), which abolishes political parties.

== Births ==
=== January ===
- January 3 – Ricardo Prado, swimmer
- January 8 – Uidemar, coach and former footballer

=== March ===
- March 11 – José de Anchieta Júnior, Brazilian politician (d. 2018)

=== May ===
- May 15 – Raí, footballer

=== November ===
- November 25 – Ana Paula Padrão, journalist

=== December ===
- December 31 – Fernanda Porto, singer

== See also ==
- 1965 in Brazilian football
- 1965 in Brazilian television
