= List of Record telenovelas =

The following is a list of telenovelas produced and broadcast by Record.

== 1950s ==
#	Premiere date	Finale date	Title	No. of episodes	Timeslot	Author	Director	Ref.
1	November 2, 1954	December 21, 1954	A Muralha	15	19h30	Ivani Ribeiro	J. Silvestre	
2	1956	1957	Vôo 509		19h30	Waldemar de Moraes	Waldemar de Moraes	
3	1957	1957	Alma na Noite		19h30	Waldemar de Moraes	Waldemar de Moraes	
4	1957	1957	My Darling		19h30	Waldemar de Moraes	Waldemar de Moraes	
5	1957	1957	A Mansão dos Daltons		19h30	Waldemar de Moraes	Waldemar de Moraes	
6	1957	1957	Desce o Pano		19h30	Ivani Ribeiro	Ciro Bassini	
7	1957	1957	O Solar das Almas Perdidas		19h30	Ciro Bassini	Ciro Bassini	
8	1957	1958	Internas de Primeira Classe		19h30	Ciro Bassini	Ciro Bassini	
9	February 3, 1958	April 24, 1958	Éramos Seis	22	19h30	Ciro Bassini	Ciro Bassini	
10	April 29, 1958	June 26, 1958	Cidade Perdida	39	19h30	Waldemar de Moraes	Waldemar de Moraes	
11	1958	1958	Aqueles Olhos		19h30	Ciro Bassini	Ciro Bassini	
12	1958	1958	Cela da Morte		19h30	Hélio Ansaldo	Ciro Bassini	
13	1958	1958	Apenas uma Ilusão		19h30	Waldemar de Moraes	Waldemar de Moraes	
14	1958	1958	Anos de Tormenta		19h30	Ciro Bassini	Ciro Bassini	
15	1958	1958	Anos de Ternura		19h30	Ciro Bassini	Ciro Bassini	
16	1959	1959	A Cidadela		19h30	Ciro Bassini	Ciro Bassini	
17	1959	1959	Lili		19h30	Ciro Bassini	Ciro Bassini	
18	1959	1959	Eu Fui Toxicômano		19h30	Hélio Ansaldo	Ciro Bassini	
19	1959	1959	Doutor Jivago		19h30	Hélio Ansaldo	Ciro Bassini	

== 1960s ==
#	Premiere date	Finale date	Title	No. of episodes	Timeslot	Author	Director	Ref.
20	1960	1960	Folhas ao Vento		19h30	Ciro Bassini	Ciro Bassini	
21	1960	1960	Viagem à Lua		19h30	Ciro Bassini	Ciro Bassini	
22	1960	1960	A Máscara e o Rosto		19h30	Ciro Bassini	Ciro Bassini	
23	1960	1960	O Homem que Eu Comprei		19h30	Ciro Bassini	Ciro Bassini	
24	1961	1961	O Preço da Glória		19h30	Ciro Bassini	Ciro Bassini	
25	1961	1961	A Senhora da Casa Grande		19h30	Ciro Bassini	Ciro Bassini	
26	1962	1962	Fiorela		19h30	Ciro Bassini	Ciro Bassini	
27	1963	1963	Gente como a Gente		19h30	Roberto Freire	Ademar Guerra	
28	1963	1964	Ontem, Hoje e Amanhã		19h30	Waldemar de Moraes	Waldemar de Moraes	
29	February 3, 1964	April 10, 1964	João Pão	50	17h30	Roberto Freire		
30	April 13, 1964	July 3, 1964	Sonho de Amor	60	17h30	Nélson Rodrigues	Sérgio Britto	
31	July 4, 1964	August 1, 1964	Vitória	21	17h30	Aldo de Maio	Sérgio Britto	
32	July 6, 1964	September 19, 1964	Renúncia	56	19h00	Roberto Freire; Walther Negrão	Randal Juliano; Silney Siqueira	
33	August 1, 1964	September 19, 1964	O Desconhecido	47	22h00	Nélson Rodrigues	Sérgio Britto; Fernando Torres	
34	September 21, 1964	December 4, 1964	Imitação da Vida	44	19h30	Ciro Bassini	Ciro Bassini	
35	September 21, 1964	December 4, 1964	Banzo	51	22h00	Walther Negrão; Roberto Freire	Silney Siqueira; Milton Travesso	
36	December 7, 1964	February 12, 1965	Prisioneiro de um Sonho	50	19h30	Roberto Freire	Randal Juliano; Roberto Freire	
37	December 7, 1964	January 8, 1965	Marcados pelo Amor	25	22h00	Walther Negrão; Roberto Freire	Nilton Travesso; Roberto Freire	
38	January 11, 1965	March 5, 1965	Somos Todos Irmãos	40	22h00	Walther Negrão; Roberto Freire	Roberto Freire	
39	February 15, 1965	July 2, 1965	Quatro Homens Juntos	100	19h30	Marcos César; Péricles do Amaral	Armando Couto	
40	March 8, 1965	June 25, 1965	Comédia Carioca	80	17h30	Carlos Heitor Cony	John Herbert	
41	June 28, 1965	September 3, 1965	Turbilhão	50	17h30	Armando Rosas	Armando Rosas	
42	July 5, 1965	September 17, 1965	Ceará contra 007	55	19h30	Marcos César	Marcos César	
43	September 20, 1965	December 3, 1965	Quem Bate	55	19h30	Marcos César	Nilton Travesso	
44	December 6, 1965	January 7, 1966	Mãos ao Ar	25	19h30	Marcos César	Marcos César	
45	August 1, 1968	October 3, 1968	As Professorinhas	28	18h00	Lúcia Lambertini	Lúcia Lambertini	
46	August 1, 1968	February 28, 1969	A Última Testemunha	152	19h00	Benedito Ruy Barbosa	Walter Avancini	
47	October 7, 1968	February 28, 1969	Ana	125	18h00	Sylvan Paezzo	Fernando Torres	
48	December 2, 1968	May 13, 1969	Os Acorrentados	127	12h00	Janete Clair	Daniel Filho	
49	March 3, 1969	March 21, 1970	Algemas de Ouro	275	19h00	Benedito Ruy Barbosa; Dulce Santucci	Dionísio Azevedo; Régis Cardoso; Walter Avancini; Waldomiro Baroni	
50	October 6, 1969	November 1, 1969	Seu Único Pecado	25	20h00	Dulce Santucci	Dionísio Azevedo	

== 1970s ==
#	Premiere date	Finale date	Title	No. of episodes	Timeslot	Author	Director	Ref.
51	March 20, 1970	March 6, 1971	As Pupilas do Senhor Reitor	279	19h30	Lauro César Muniz	Dionísio Azevedo	
52	November 30, 1970	August 7, 1971	Tilim	235	18h30	Dulce Santucci	Wanda Kosmo	
53	March 8, 1971	December 14, 1971	Os Deuses Estão Mortos	242	19h30	Lauro César Muniz	Marlos Andreutti; Dionísio Azevedo	
54	April 7, 1971	August 7, 1971	Editora Mayo, Bom Dia	102	19h00	Walther Negrão	Carlos Manga	
55	August 9, 1971	December 14, 1971	Pingo de Gente	110	18h30	Raimundo Lopes	Zéluiz Pinho	
56	December 15, 1971	April 28, 1972	Sol Amarelo	119	19h30	Raimundo Lopes	Zéluiz Pinho; Waldemar de Moraes	
57	December 15, 1971	March 5, 1972	Quarenta Anos Depois	71	20h00	Lauro César Muniz	Marlos Andreutti; Waldemar de Moraes	
58	January 4, 1972	April 28, 1972	O Príncipe e o Mendigo	84	18h30	Marcos Rey	Dionísio Azevedo	
59	March 7, 1972	November 11, 1972	O Tempo não Apaga	215	20h00	Amaral Gurgel	Waldemar de Moraes; Waldomiro Baroni	
60	May 2, 1972	September 2, 1972	Os Fidalgos da Casa Mourisca	107	19h00	Dulce Santucci	Randal Juliano	
61	September 4, 1972	December 16, 1972	O Leopardo	90	19h00	Ivani Ribeiro	Waldemar de Moraes	
62	September 1, 1972	March 10, 1973	Eu e a Moto	140	18h30	Amaral Gurgel	Myrian Muniz; Sílvio Zilber	
63	November 13, 1972	March 10, 1973	Quero Viver	102	20h00	Amaral Gurgel	Waldemar de Moraes	
64	March 12, 1973	July 28, 1973	Vendaval	120	20h00	Ody Fraga	Waldemar de Moraes	
65	April 2, 1973	July 27, 1973	Venha Ver o Sol na Estrada	101	19h45	Leilah Assumpção	Antunes Filho	
66	July 30, 1973	November 30, 1973	Vidas Marcadas	107	20h00	Amaral Gurgel	Waldomiro Baroni; Waldemar de Moraes	
67	December 10, 1973	January 31, 1974	Meu Adorável Mendigo	46	20h00	Emanuel Rodrigues		
68	January 25, 1977	June 13, 1977	O Espantalho	119	21h00	Ivani Ribeiro	José Miziara; David Grinberg	

== 1990s ==
#	Premiere date	Finale date	Title	No. of episodes	Timeslot	Author	Director	Ref.
69	September 15, 1997	March 2, 1998	Canoa do Bagre	121	20h00	Ronaldo Ciambroni	Atílio Riccó	
70	May 4, 1998	March 26, 1999	Estrela de Fogo	248	20h00	Yves Dumont	José Paulo Vallone	
71	March 30, 1999	September 10, 1999	Louca Paixão	141	20h15	Yves Dumont	José Paulo Vallone; Jacques Lagoa; Rodolfo Silot	
72	September 14, 1999	February 7, 2000	Tiro e Queda	126	20h15	Luís Carlos Fusco	José Paulo Vallone; Jacques Lagoa; Rodolfo Silot	

== 2000s ==
#	Premiere date	Finale date	Title	No. of episodes	Timeslot	Author	Director	Ref.
73	May 8, 2000	November 17, 2000	Marcas da Paixão	167	20h15	Solange Castro Neves	Atílio Riccó; Henrique Martins; Fernando Leal	
74	November 20, 2000	April 16, 2001	Vidas Cruzadas	127	20h15	Marcos Lazarini	Atílio Riccó; Henrique Martins	
75	April 17, 2001	August 31, 2001	Roda da Vida	118	20h15	Solange Castro Neves	Del Rangel	
76	March 14, 2004	August 27, 2004	Metamorphoses	122	20h15	Arlette Siaretta; Letícia Dornelles	Tizuka Yamasaki; Pedro Siaretta	
77	October 18, 2004	April 29, 2005	A Escrava Isaura	167	19h15	Tiago Santiago	Herval Rossano	
78	May 2, 2005	October 21, 2005	Essas Mulheres	149	19h15	Marcílio Moraes; Rosane Lima	Flávio Colatrello Jr.	
79	October 24, 2005	July 17, 2006	Prova de Amor	229	19h15	Tiago Santiago	Alexandre Avancini	
80	March 13, 2006	November 20, 2006	Cidadão Brasileiro	213	22h00	Lauro César Muniz	Ivan Zettel; Flávio Colatrello Jr.	
81	July 18, 2006	March 20, 2007	Bicho do Mato	212	19h15	Cristianne Fridman; Bosco Brasil	Edson Spinello	
82	October 17, 2006	June 1, 2007	Alta Estação	162	18h00	Margareth Boury	João Camargo	
83	November 21, 2006	August 27, 2007	Vidas Opostas	240	22h00	Marcílio Moraes	Alexandre Avancini	
84	March 21, 2007	November 20, 2007	Luz do Sol	210	20h30	Ana Maria Moretzsohn	Ivan Zettel	
85	August 28, 2007	June 2, 2008	Caminhos do Coração	240	20h30	Tiago Santiago	Alexandre Avancini	
86	November 20, 2007	July 22, 2008	Amor e Intrigas	210	22h00	Gisele Joras	Edson Spinello	
87	June 3, 2008	March 23, 2009	Os Mutantes: Caminhos do Coração	243	20h30	Tiago Santiago	Alexandre Avancini	
88	July 8, 2008	April 28, 2009	Chamas da Vida	253	22h00	Cristianne Fridman	Edgard Miranda	
89	March 24, 2009	August 3, 2009	Mutantes: Promessas de Amor	103	20h30	Tiago Santiago	Alexandre Avancini	
90	April 14, 2009	March 2, 2010	Poder Paralelo	237	22h00	Lauro César Muniz	Ignácio Coqueiro	
91	August 4, 2009	June 2, 2010	Bela, a Feia	217	20h30	Gisele Joras	Edson Spinello	

== 2010s ==
#	Premiere date	Finale date	Title	No. of episodes	Timeslot	Author	Director	Ref.
92	May 18, 2010	May 2, 2011	Ribeirão do Tempo	250	22h15	Marcílio Moraes	Edgard Miranda	
93	March 21, 2011	October 12, 2012	Rebelde	410	19h30 19h00 20h30	Margareth Boury	Ivan Zettel	
94	May 3, 2011	April 9, 2012	Vidas em Jogo	243	22h30	Cristianne Fridman	Alexandre Avancini	
95	April 10, 2012	October 2, 2012	Máscaras	125	23h15	Lauro César Muniz	Ignácio Coqueiro	
96	October 4, 2012	May 20, 2013	Balacobaco	163	22h30	Gisele Joras	Edson Spinello	
97	May 21, 2013	September 24, 2013	Dona Xepa	91	22h30	Gustavo Reiz	Ivan Zettel	
98	September 25, 2013	May 30, 2014	Pecado Mortal	176	21h15	Carlos Lombardi	Alexandre Avancini	
99	June 2, 2014	March 20, 2015	Vitória	208	21h15	Cristianne Fridman	Edgard Miranda	
100	March 23, 2015	July 4, 2016	Os Dez Mandamentos	242	20h30	Vivian de Oliveira	Alexandre Avancini	
101	May 31, 2016	January 9, 2017	Escrava Mãe	159	19h30	Gustavo Reiz	Ivan Zettel	
102	July 5, 2016	March 13, 2017	A Terra Prometida	179	20h30	Renato Modesto	Alexandre Avancini	
103	March 12, 2017	November 20, 2017	O Rico e Lázaro	181	20h45	Paula Richard	Edgard Miranda	
104	July 25, 2017	January 26, 2018	Belaventura	134	19h45	Gustavo Reiz	Ivan Zettel	
105	November 21, 2017	June 25, 2018	Apocalipse	155	20h45	Vivian de Oliveira	Edson Spinello	
106	July 24, 2018	April 22, 2019	Jesus	193	20h45	Paula Richard	Edgard Miranda	
107	April 23, 2019	August 12, 2019	Jezabel	80	20h45	Cristianne Fridman	Alexandre Avancini	
108	May 21, 2019	December 9, 2019	Topíssima	145	19h45	Cristianne Fridman	Rudi Lagemann	
109	December 10, 2019	January 18, 2021	Amor sem Igual	148	20h30	Cristianne Fridman	Rudi Lagemann	

== 2020s ==
#	Premiere date	Finale date	Title	No. of episodes	Timeslot	Author	Director	Ref.
110	January 19, 2021	November 22, 2021	Gênesis	220	21h00	Camilo Pellegrini	Edgard Miranda	
111	March 22, 2022	TBA	Reis	TBA	21h00	Raphaela Castro	Juan Pablo Pires	
112	July 7, 2025	September 12, 2025	Paulo, o Apóstolo	50	21h00	Cristiane Cardoso	Leonardo Miranda	

== See also ==
- Record
