= Pintadas =

Municipality of Bahia State, Brazil

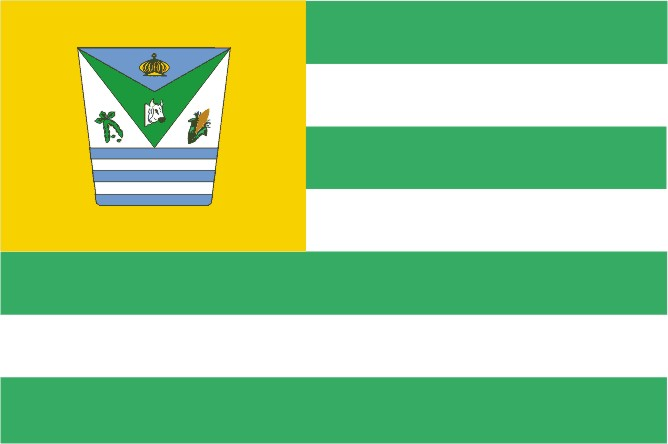
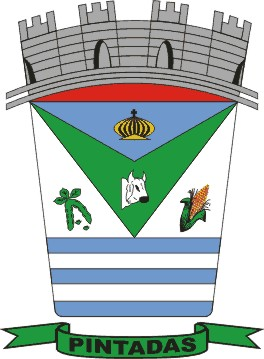
- Flag Coat of arms

- Coordinates: 11°48′46″S 39°54′32″W
- Region: Nordeste
- State: Bahia
- Founded: 9 May 1985
- Elevation: 300 m (980 ft)

Population (2020)
  - Total: 10,394
- Time zone: UTC−3 (BRT)
- Postal code: 2924652

Pintadas is a municipality in the Brazilian state of Bahia.

== Gallery ==
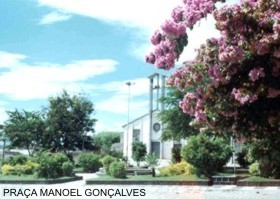

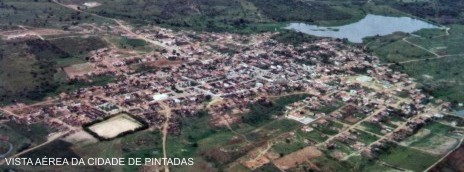

== See also ==
- List of municipalities in Bahia
