= TV Globo General Director of Journalism =

Breaking news segment by Brazilian channel TV Globo

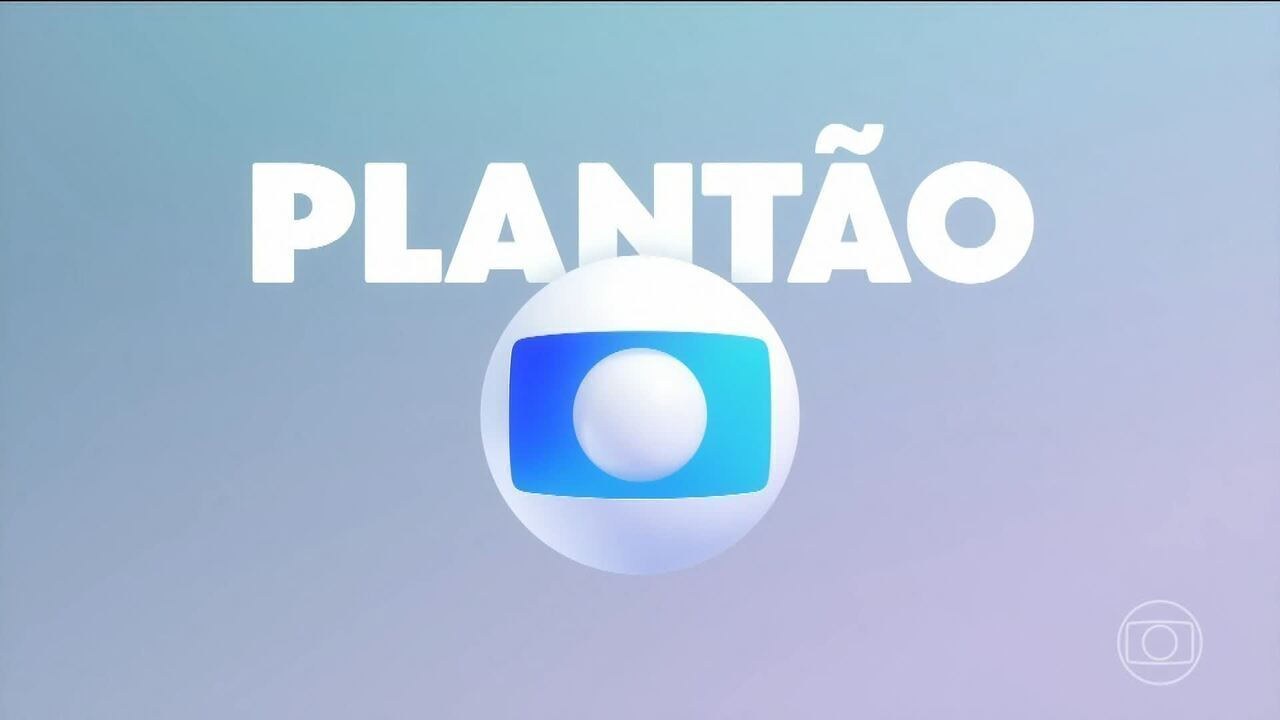
- Logo since 2025
- Genre: Newscast
- Theme music composer: João Nabuco
- Country of origin: Brazil
- Original language: Portuguese

Original release
- Network: TV Globo
- Release: 1976 – present

Plantão da Globo is the title of the breaking news segment of TV Globo that, usually, interrupts the programming of the broadcaster to report last-minute news that has some importance to society. Following the original format, it is produced and presented by journalists who are on duty at the broadcaster and are specifically called upon for that purpose.

The title sequence features a 3D animation of several news microphones and cameras orbiting around and then flying towards the screen, accompanied by the Plantão theme music.

Due to the relatively rare occurrence of this format (usually seen only a few times a year), the alarming music, and the wide cultural association of the Plantão breaking news title with shocking events or disasters, it is feared mainly by Brazilian viewers.

== Exhibition ==
The current format, with characteristic music and title sequence, was first transmitted on August 19, 1991, bringing news that the United States had ceased all economic aid to the USSR due to the attempted coup against Gorbachev at the time. Currently, the Plantão has technical collaboration from Globo News, mainly during the early hours and on weekends. Currently, the program is broadcast simultaneously on both channels, under the supervision of the Globo Journalism Directorate. The program is transmitted live across Brazil, even in states with different time zones, to Brasilia Time, that transmits the normal programming in a shifted time. Because of this, there have been instances where the bulletin has interrupted a time-shifted newscast, in which the presenter of the newscast is also the presenter of the Plantão.

== Impact ==
It is the oldest and most famous known extra (journalistic language) in Brazil, having reported on almost all major news events of the last 30 years, such as wars, deaths, natural disasters, accidents, sequestrations, historical occurrences, terrorist attacks, and political events worldwide. Along with the audio - inspired in the title sequence of Repórter Esso, from Rede Tupi, composed by then maestro of TV Globo, João Nabuco, the title sequence and outro, created by Hans Donner, is iconic and known characteristic of the newscast, that has a certain influence over journalism and national behavior. Typically, everything shown in the Plantão is also featured on other news broadcasts. Images made live in Brazil have already been retransmitted by big international news channels, such as CNN's Breaking News during the kidnapping of bus 174 in Rio de Janeiro and the TAM 3054 accident in São Paulo. Among all of the facts broadcast to this day, the most remembered is the September 11 attacks, both by the impact of the news, as well as for the "mystery" of which program was interrupted that day by the newscast, with many urban legends saying the program interrupted was an episode of Dragon Ball Z (though there is a lack of evidence for this, suggesting it's a case of the Mandela Effect).

With the advent of social media, the Plantão da Globo has become the most talked-about subject from the moment it goes on air, whether due to the impact of the information that interrupts normal broadcasting or the reaction to the title sequence when it does interrupt.

The largest number of times the show was broadcast on a single day was on May 1, 1994, following the death of Formula 1 driver Ayrton Senna. The years with the least quantity of broadcasts were 2014, in which only two broadcasts happened in the year - one in February and one in September - and 2019, another year where only two broadcasts happened: the first in January 13, with the extradition of Italian terrorist Cesare Battisti, that happened in Bolivia, and the second in May 12, when the death of actor Lúcio Mauro was announced. Both were shown on a Sunday morning. This is due to the new directive in global journalism, that resumed the extra bulletins of the normal newscasts from the broadcaster, almost eliminating the occurrences of the show.

The broadcast with the most live viewers was on May 18, 2017, reporting the accusations against then-President Michel Temer and federal deputy Aécio Neves, surpassing the broadcast reporting the impeachment of Dilma Rousseff.
