= Roberto Freire (psychiatrist) =

Anarchist author and psychiatrist (1927–2008)

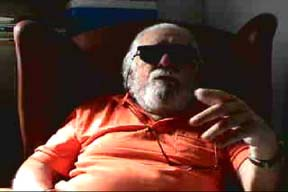
- Freire in 2003
- Born: Joaquim Roberto Corrêa Freire; 18 January 1927; São Paulo, Brazil
- Died: 23 May 2008 (aged 81); São Paulo, Brazil
- Education: University of Brazil/RJ
- Occupations: Medical psychiatrist and writer
- Known for: Somatheraphy
- Movement: Anarchism
- Children: Paulo Freire (musician); Tuco Freire (musician).

Roberto Freire (São Paulo, b. January 18, 1927; São Paulo, d. May 23, 2008) was a medical psychiatrist and Brazilian writer. He created somatherapy (Portuguese: somaterapia), also referred to as SOMA, an anarchist therapy based on the then radical new ideas of Wilhelm Reich, as well as the Brazilian martial art Capoeira Angola. As an active writer, Freire published more than thirty books in his life, among these his 1966 work Cleo e Daniel was a bestseller.

== Early life and education ==
Joaquim Roberto Corrêa Freire was born in São Paulo on 18 January 1927. Freire studied medicine before going on to conduct research in electrophysiology and cellular biophysics with Carlos Chagas Filho at the Federal University of Rio de Janeiro. In 1953, Freire moved to Paris to work at the Collège de France in experimental endocrinology with Robert Courrier. Freire completed training in psychoanalysis with the Sociedade Brasileira de Psicanálise de São Paulo, under the guidance of Henrique Schloman. In 1956, Freire worked in clinical support at the Juqueri Psychiatric Hospital in Franco da Rocha.

== Somatherapy ==
Somatherapy (or Soma) was created by Freire in the 1970s as a group therapy, based on the research of the psychoanalyst Wilhelm Reich. With the objective of freeing the individual to be more creative, the exercises in Soma work with the relationship between the body and emotions. The therapy integrates a structural critique, as it "seeks to liberate the individual from the neurosis caused by a repressive society". Somatherapy is intended to "challenge authoritarian politics and competitve capitalist social relationships at a personal level, by cultivating bodily awareness and producing non-authoritarian social relationships". Other essential ingredients in Soma are the studies of antipsychiatry related to human communication and the Brazilian martial art / dance Capoeira Angola. Soma groups last a year and a half, with frequent sessions, including usually one full weekend per month for the entire group, as well as frequent capoeira classes, study sessions, social activities, and two self-organized group trips. These times together allow the participants to build and develop the group dynamic, in line with the principles of anarchism.

Freire's therapeutic approach grew from his experiences with the Centro de Estudos Macunaíma alongside the theatre scholars Myriam Muniz and Sylvio Zilber and the architecture professor Flávio Império. Freire's engagement with the 'Living Theater' theatre group and the theoretical work of Wilhelm Reich were also important influences. Freire also drew from the work of Max Striner, Gregory Bateson, Frederick Perls, and Thomas Hanna. Most of Freire's original writing has yet to be translated to English. Most of Freire's original writing concerning somatherapy has yet to be translated to English.

== Politics ==
Freire explained, in a 1983 interview with Jornal Psi, that "I always felt like an anarchist, but an anarchist of spontaneous consciousness devoid of 'pre' ideology", later he "became a Marxist" and "got involved with the Communist Party" which he eventually left and "got involved with Ação Popular" instead.

== Personal life ==
Freire had three children including Paulo de Oliveira Freire (born 1957) and Pedro ('Tuco') De Oliveira Freire (14 October 1954 - 20 October 2015). Paulo is a musician, as was Tuco. Friere was married, however this ended in 1972 - and he described it as a "bourgeois marriage". In an interview with Diário da Tarde, Friere stated that he raised his children with the "libertarian pedagogy" that "we anarchists have developed".

== Works ==
=== Written work ===
- Freire, R. (1966). Cleo e Daniel
- Freire, R. and Brito, F. (1984). Utopia e Paixão – A politica do cotidiano
- Freire, R. (1977). Viva eu, viva tu, vivao rabo do tatu!
- Freire, R. (1982). Tchau Amor
- Freire, R. (1986). Coiote
- Freire, R. (1987). Ame e Dê Vexame
- Freire, R. (1987). Sem Tesão Não Há Solução
- Freire, R. (1988). SOMA, Vol 1 – A alma é o Corpo
- Freire, R. (1991). SOMA, Vol 2 – A Arma é o Corpo. ISBN 978-85-277-0188-4
- Freire, R. (1991). Histórias Cultas e Grossas, Vol 1 & 2
- Freire, R. (1992). A Farsa Ecológica
- Freire, R. (1994). A fórmula da esperança
- Freire, R. (1994). Moleques de rua
- Freire, R. (1994). O Milagre de Santa Chorona
- Freire, R. (1994). Domadores, Mágicos e Ladrões
- Freire, R. (1995). A Revolta dos Meninos
- Freire, R. (1995). Tesudos de todo o mundo, uni-vos!
- Freire, R. (1995). Os Cúmplices, Vol 1
- Freire, R. (1996). Os Cúmplices, Vol 2
- Freire, R. (1999). Liv e Tatziu – Uma História de Amor Incestuoso. ISBN 978-85-250-3150-1
- Freire, R. (1999). O Tesão e o Sonho
- Freire, R. (1999). O tesão e o sonho
- Freire, R. (2003). O Momento Culminante
- Freire, R. (2003). Eu é um outro

=== Film and television ===
- Marcados pelo Amor (1964)
- Cleo e Daniel (1970)
- O Amor É Nosso (1981)
- Banzo (1964)
- Eu E a Moto (1972)
