= 1971 in Brazilian television =

This is a list of Brazilian television related events from 1971.

== Events ==
- April 21: First edition of Jornal Hoje on TV Globo.
- July 28: Pinga-Fogo (TV Tupi) holds a historic, record-breaking interview with Uberaban medium Chico Xavier that went beyond expectations, the edition went on air for more than three hours, more than the scheduled 60-minute slot, achieving an audience share of 75%.
- November 1: A fire hits at the headquarters of TV Globo, burning only one studio.

== Debuts ==
- Jornal Hoje

== Networks and services ==
=== Launches ===
Network	Type	Launch date	Notes	Source
TV Rio Preto	Terrestrial	15 January		
TVE Amazônia	Terrestrial	12 March		
TV Globo Brasília	Terrestrial	21 April		
TV Sergipe	Terrestrial	15 November		

== Births ==
- 21 August - Carmo Dalla Vecchia, actor & model
- 14 November - Marcio Ballas, TV host

== See also ==
- 1971 in Brazil
