= 1965 in Brazilian television =

This is a list of Brazilian television related events from 1965.

== Events ==
- 26 April – TV Globo begins broadcasting in Rio de Janeiro.
- 26 April – At 11 am, the children's program Úni Dúni Tê, inspired by the American children's program Romper Room, premieres on the TV Globo's inauguration day. This is the network's first program.
- 26 April – At 11:30 pm, the daily news program, Se a Cidade Contasse, debuts on TV Globo until 27 August 1965. It is inspired by a column of the same name published in the Brazilian newspaper O Globo between 1961 and 1966.
- 26 April – Tele Globo, the first news program on TV Globo, premieres on the station's inauguration day. It is a half-hour news program with national and international coverage.
- 26 April – The interview program Show da Noite, hosted by actor Gláucio Gill, premieres on the station's inauguration day.
- 28 April – A fire broke out at TV Cultura's studio A.

== Launches ==
Network	Type	Launch date	Notes	Source
TV Globo (Rio)	Terrestrial	26 April		
TV Morena	Terrestrial	25 December		

== Births ==
- 31 January - Adriano Garib, actor
- 6 April - Juan Alba, actor, TV host & singer

== See also ==
- 1965 in Brazil
