= 1988 in Brazilian television =

This is a list of Brazilian television related events from 1988.

== Television shows ==
=== 1970s ===
- Turma da Mônica (1976–present)

=== 1980s ===
- Xou da Xuxa (1986-1992)

== Births ==
- 6 October - Kayky Brito, actor

== See also ==
- 1988 in Brazil
