= TV Ceará =

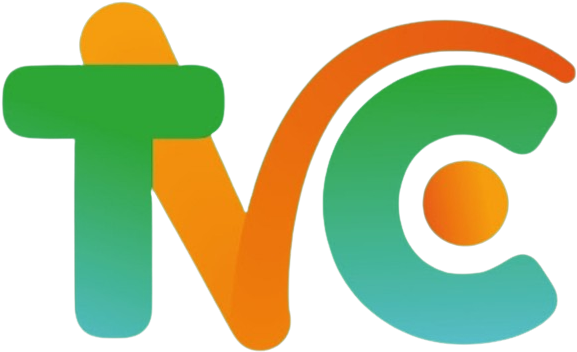
- Fortaleza, Ceará; Brazil
- Channels: Digital: 28 (UHF); Virtual: 5
- Branding: TVC

Programming
- Affiliations: TV Brasil

Ownership
- Owner: Government of Ceará; (Fundação de Teleducação do Estado do Ceará - FUNTELC)

History
- First air date: March 7, 1974
- Former call signs: ZYB 211; ZYA 428
- Former channel numbers: Analog: 5 (VHF, 1974-2017)
- Former affiliations: Independent (1974 - 1979); TVE Brasil (1975 - 2007); SescTV (2004 - 2009); TV Senado (2005- 2007); TV Cultura (1993 - 2026)

Technical information
- Licensing authority: ANATEL
- ERP: 6 kW
- Transmitter coordinates: 3°44′34.01″S 38°30′6.98″W

Links
- Public license information: Profile
- Website: www.tvceara.ce.gov.br

TV Ceará (also known by the acronym TVC) is a Brazilian educational television station based in Fortaleza, the capital of the state of Ceará. It operates on channel 5 (28 UHF digital) and retransmits programming from TV Cultura and TV Brasil. The station is administered by the Ceará Teleducation Foundation (FUNTELC), a government body of the state of Ceará.

The station was inaugurated on 7 March 1974 as TV Educativa (TVE), maintained by the Educational Foundation of the State of Ceará (FUNEDUCE). Its primary objective was to educate elementary school students in public schools within the metropolitan region of Fortaleza through a tele-education system in classrooms. FUNTELC assumed management of the station in 1979. At the beginning of the following decade, a terrestrial system with 150 retransmitters was installed across Ceará, expanding the signal’s reach to students in more than two thousand schools throughout the state. Until the 1990s, the system also included a secondary channel that enabled commercial broadcasters to transmit their programming to audiences in the interior regions of Ceará.

From 1987 onwards, TVE shifted from its purely educational focus and began producing cultural and journalistic programs, gradually evolving into a public broadcaster. In 1993, the station adopted the name TV Ceará in homage to a station that operated in Fortaleza from 1960 to 1980. Over the years, the educational television system underwent structural changes implemented by successive governments until it was discontinued in the mid-2000s. Since then, TVC has focused on producing programs across various genres.

== History ==
In February 1970, the government of Ceará, under Governor Plácido Aderaldo Castelo and through the Secretariat of Education and Culture, obtained the grant for VHF channel 5 in Fortaleza for educational purposes. While the building that would house the future station in the Aldeota neighborhood was under construction—led by engineer Arthur Torres de Mello—a state law was passed on 18 October 1973 during the administration of Governor César Cals. This law established the Educational Foundation of the State of Ceará and created Educational Television, which was administered by the State Teleducation System.

=== Initial broadcasts and inauguration ===
Experimental broadcasts of black-and-white films began on 18 February 1974, accompanied by a narrated message about the tests by actor Ricardo Guilherme. These broadcasts were initially viewed only by students from state public schools. TV Educativa was inaugurated on 7 March 1974 in a ceremony attended by César Cals and the Minister of Education, Jarbas Passarinho. In his speech, Cals emphasized the station's objectives:

"[Television] will certainly put an end to the anxiety that affects all of us here, which is seeing hundreds of young people unable to receive an apprenticeship. worthy due to lack of means".

Initially, the signal reached eight cities in the metropolitan region of Fortaleza.

The station's first team was led by pedagogue Geraldo Campos, who selected educators and artists from the now-defunct TV Ceará drama department. The team underwent training in other states, including a visit to TV Educativa do Maranhão, which served as an inspiration for the Ceará station. The state government's total investment ranged between eight and nine million cruzeiros. Targeting students from the fifth to eighth grades in public schools, the programming included teleclasses and telenovelas with educational content to engage students, who watched the programs in classrooms under the supervision of advisors.

=== Expansion and technological advancements ===
Under Governor Virgílio Távora, the Ceará Teleducation Foundation was created on 22 May 1979, assuming responsibility for administering TVE. Toward the end of his term in the early 1980s, investment was directed toward a terrestrial relay system designed by electrical engineer Carlos Ernesto Pontes, who flew over nearly the entire state of Ceará in a single-engine aircraft to identify the highest points in urban and rural areas for the installation of towers with microwave antennas. These towers enabled the transmission of TVE’s signal to 150 repeaters, expanding coverage to more than two thousand schools across Ceará's 184 municipalities.

FUNTELC also financed the retransmission of commercial stations to the interior of the state, aligning with the Brazilian military government's strategy to promote national integration through television.

=== Transition to public broadcasting and diversification ===
In 1987, during the administration of Governor Tasso Jereissati, structural changes were introduced at TVE. Under the direction of Marcondes Rosa, a professor and pro-rector of the Federal University of Ceará, the station moved away from its original policy of ceasing operations during public school holidays and began producing cultural and informal education programs, transforming itself into a public broadcaster. In 1988, TVE established the Ceará Animation Center to produce films, documentaries, and television graphics.

During the terms of Tasso Jereissati and Ciro Gomes, who succeeded him in 1991, TVE was used to consolidate the government's image. Efforts to universalize the educational television system aimed at improving programming and increasing student enrollment. However, educators criticized the move, citing difficulties in classroom supervision and inadequate signal coverage. In 1993, TVE was renamed TV Ceará in honor of the station that had operated in Fortaleza until 1980. A new logo, created by publicist Eduardo Odecio, replaced the original owl with an image featuring bright colors, representing cacti and a seed, and reinforcing the acronym TVC. That same year, the station was transferred from the Department of Education to the Department of Culture and Sports.

The state government also decided that the secondary channel of the terrestrial network, which had been used for free retransmissions of TVE's signal, would be allocated to a commercial broadcaster through a public tender, a move that contradicted the views of the station’s management.

=== Journalistic expansion and workforce changes ===
The change in administrative control led to the creation of new cultural and news programs. TV Ceará’s journalism adopted an editorial line focused on public interest matters, departing from the "blank slate" approach. However, a team of 120 professionals working in this department for two years was disbanded following a decision by the Court of Auditors of the State of Ceará, which cited the lack of a public hiring process. To address the staffing issue, during Tasso Jereissati's second term in 1995, journalism students were hired as interns. Initially, the Secretariat of State Administration authorized the selection of three interns, with three more added during Jereissati's third term, filling roles such as presenters, reporters, and content planners. Many of these interns went on to work for commercial broadcasters in Fortaleza.

During this period, TV Ceará’s pedagogical team was separated from the program production team. Despite unsuccessful protests, some educators requested retirement or were transferred to the Department of Basic Education, leaving only six teachers to oversee the teleclasses. The termination of a contract with a commercial broadcaster enabled FUNTELC to utilize only one network channel, improving the quality of the retransmitted signal across the state.

=== Modernization and introduction of digital broadcasting ===
By the end of Tasso's third term, around 2002, the government authorized an investment of five million reais to install a satellite capture system, improving signal reception in schools and preventing outages caused by power failures. An additional ten million reais was allocated to purchase teaching materials from Fundação Roberto Marinho, incorporating the Telecurso 2000 distance education program. This allowed the implementation of accelerated learning classes for adults who had missed out on primary and secondary education, with lessons broadcast at night on TV Ceará.

The Secretariat of Culture also supported TVC by enabling new operational revenues, ensuring the renewal of equipment, renovations of the station’s headquarters, and the production of new vignettes and scenarios. Agreements were also signed with public universities to provide professional training. Additionally, the station joined the Rede Pública de Televisão, allowing it to obtain funding through institutional advertising from the Brazilian government.

=== Institutional changes and discontinuation of educational programming ===
The government of Lúcio Alcântara, who served from 2003 to 2007, unsuccessfully attempted to transfer TV Ceará's administration to a social organization. This initiative, modeled after the transfer of TV Educativa do Rio de Janeiro from a public foundation to a private association in the late 1990s, became a bill submitted by Tasso Jereissati to the Legislative Assembly of the State of Ceará (ALECE). Between 2005 and 2006, under Alcântara’s mandate, TVC discontinued its educational television system, making it, along with TVE Maranhão, one of the last educational stations in Brazil to regularly broadcast teleclasses.

=== Revitalization and transition to digital broadcasting ===
By 2007, when Cid Gomes assumed office, TV Ceará was in a state of decline, with a degraded structure, a diminished workforce, lack of transport, and only one set for all programs. Most retransmitters in the interior had no signal, and the contract with TV Cultura of São Paulo, which had been in place since 1993, was not renewed due to the station's deteriorating situation. While TVE Brasil was in the process of integration into a new national public network, TV Ceará turned to affiliated networks such as SescTV and TV Senado to sustain programming. In December 2007, TV Ceará became one of the first affiliates of TV Brasil when the network was launched.

Under the leadership of journalist Guto Benevides, who succeeded filmmaker Glauber Filho, TV Ceará’s command was transferred from the Secretariat of Culture to the Civil House of the Government. Through an agreement with ALECE, the station began broadcasting legislative sessions live and hiring its own journalists, producing news programs with the support of TV Assembleia and TV Fortaleza. New programs across various genres were introduced, while others were reformulated, along with renovations of sets and studios. The station’s headquarters also underwent upgrades.

During Benevides' administration, TVC began digital broadcasts in Fortaleza. Following an investment of 13 million reais, tests on digital UHF channel 28 commenced on 20 July 2009, with the official launch taking place on 28 August 2009, attended by politicians, businessmen, artists, and communicators, including Cid Gomes. This development made TVC the third broadcaster in Ceará and the first public television station in Brazil to transmit in high definition.

== Sources ==
- Serpa, Paulo Ernesto Saraiva (2007). Há Dimensão pública no jornalismo de uma TV estatal? Análise do telejornal Revista, da TV Ceará, uma emissora mantida pelo Governo do Estado (PDF) (Thesis) (in Portuguese). Fortaleza, Brazil: Universidade Federal do Ceará.
- Benevides, Guto (2015). O desafio da TVC: do caos analógico ao pioneirismo digital, 2007-2014 (in Portuguese). Fortaleza, Brazil. ISBN 9788542006254.
