= Dona Xepa =

- Genre: Telenovela
- Created by: Gustavo Reiz
- Directed by: Ivan Zettel
- Starring: Ângela Leal; Thaís Fersoza; Arthur Aguiar; Rayana Carvalho; Gabriel Gracindo
- Opening theme: "A Xepa" by Eliana de Lima
- Country of origin: Brazil
- Original language: Portuguese
- No. of episodes: 91

Production
- Camera setup: Multi-camera
- Running time: 45 minutes

Original release
- Network: Record TV
- Release: May 21 – September 24, 2013

Dona Xepa (English: The Penny Lady) is a Brazilian telenovela created and written by Gustavo Reiz and directed by Ivan Zettel. It premiered on May 21, 2013 and ended on September 24, 2013. It stars Ângela Leal, Thaís Fersoza, Arthur Aguiar, Rayana Carvalho, and Gabriel Gracindo.

== Plot ==
Dona Xepa is the story of a mother who does everything for her children. Without much education, Dona Xepa says everything wrong and it embarrasses her children Rosalia and Edison. The tradeswoman earned this nickname by distributing the leftovers in her tent to the poor. Abandoned by her husband Esmeraldino, Xepa supports her children by working hard. Rosalia is a lawyer, beautiful, ambitious, she hates the life she leads and will do everything she can to infiltrate the rich world. Edison is an architecture student and despite being ashamed of his mother at times, he can do nothing to harm her.

== Cast ==
- Ângela Leal as Carlota Losano Coelho 'Dona Xepa'
- Thaís Fersoza as Rosália Losano Coelho/Rosa Vieira Passarelli
- Arthur Aguiar as Édison Losano Coelho
- Rayana Carvalho as Lis Pantaleão
- Gabriel Gracindo as François Fontaine Castro
- Márcio Kieling as Victor Hugo Pantaleão
- Gabriela Durlo as Isabela Castro and Barros Pantaleão
- Pérola Faria as Yasmin Silva
- Luíza Tomé as Magnólia dos Santos Pantaleão 'Meg'
- Angelina Muniz as Pérola Castro and Barros
- Bia Montez as Matilda Batista
- Bemvindo Sequeira as Dorivaldo de Souza
- Robertha Portella as Dafne Batista 'Mulher Tutti-Frutti'
- Alexandre Barillari as Robério Escovão
- José Dumont as Esmeraldino Losano/Rubinato
- Maurício Mattar as Júlio César Pantaleão
- Giuseppe Oristanio as Deputado Feliciano Castro e Barros
- Emilio Dantas as Benito de Souza
- Marcela Muniz as Genuína Silva 'Geni'
- Manuela Duarte as Cintia Lopez
- Diego Montez as Ricardo Lopes Coutinho 'Rick'
- Manoelita Lustosa as Terezinha Cho
- Ítala Nandi as Catherine Fontaine
- Augusto Garcia as João da Graça 'Graxinha'
- Ana Clara Pintor as Gisele Batista da Graça
- Jennifer Setti as Inocência da Conceição 'Mulher Broa'
- Castrinho as Ângelo Lazarini
- Aracy Cardoso as Alda Motta
- Ana Zettel as Leydiane Maria 'Lady'
- Gustavo Moretzsohn as Professor Miro
- Raphael Montagner as Leandro
- Alessandra Loyola as Camila
- Aninha Melo as Fernanda
- Nanda Oliveira as Bruna
- Junior Vieira as Vinícius
- Juliana David as Sophia
- Yago Lopes as Alê
- Ana Carolina Rainha as Jezebel
- Jefferson Brasil as Tairone
- Ricardo Ferreira as Galeto
- João Garrel as Fuinha
- Antônio Rocha Filho as Amadeu
- Daniela Pessoa as Chiara

== Ratings ==
Season	Timeslot (BRT/AMT)	Episodes	First aired		Last aired	
Season	Timeslot (BRT/AMT)	Episodes	Date	Viewers (in points)	Date	Viewers (in points)
1	Mon–Fri 10:15pm	91	May 21, 2013	9	September 24, 2013	10
