= 1992 in Brazil =

Events in the year 1992 in Brazil.

== Incumbents ==
=== Federal government ===
- President:
  - Fernando Collor de Mello (until 29 December)
  - Itamar Franco (starting 29 December)
- Vice President:
  - Itamar Franco (until 29 December)
  - Vacant (starting 29 December)

=== Governors ===
- Acre:
  - Edmundo Pinto (until 17 May)
  - Vacant thereafter (starting 17 May)
- Alagoas: Geraldo Bulhões
- Amapa: Annibal Barcellos
- Amazonas: Gilberto Mestrinho
- Bahia: Antônio Carlos Magalhães
- Ceará: Ciro Gomes
- Espírito Santo: Albuíno Cunha de Azeredo
- Goiás: Iris Rezende
- Maranhão: Edison Lobão
- Mato Grosso: Jaime Campos
- Mato Grosso do Sul: Pedro Pedrossian
- Minas Gerais: Hélio Garcia
- Pará: Jader Barbalho
- Paraíba: Ronaldo Cunha Lima
- Paraná: Roberto Requião de Mello e Silva
- Pernambuco: Joaquim Francisco Cavalcanti
- Piauí: Freitas Neto
- Rio de Janeiro: Leonel Brizola
- Rio Grande do Norte: José Agripino Maia
- Rio Grande do Sul: Alceu de Deus Collares
- Rondônia: Oswaldo Piana Filho
- Roraima: Ottomar de Sousa Pinto
- Santa Catarina: Vilson Kleinübing
- São Paulo: Luís Antônio Fleury Filho
- Sergipe: João Alves Filho
- Tocantins: Moisés Nogueira Avelino

=== Vice governors ===
- Acre:
  - Romildo Magalhães da Silva (until 17 May)
  - Vacant thereafter (starting 17 May)
- Alagoas: Francisco Roberto Holanda de Melo
- Amapá: Ronaldo Pinheiro Borges
- Amazonas: Francisco Garcia Rodrigues
- Bahia: Paulo Souto
- Ceará: Lúcio Gonçalo de Alcântara
- Espírito Santo: Adelson Antônio Salvador
- Goiás: Luís Alberto Maguito Vilela
- Maranhão: José de Ribamar Fiquene
- Mato Grosso: Osvaldo Roberto Sobrinho
- Mato Grosso do Sul: Ary Rigo
- Minas Gerais: Arlindo Porto Neto
- Pará: Carlos José Oliveira Santos
- Paraíba: Cícero Lucena Filho
- Paraná: Mário Pereira
- Pernambuco: Carlos Roberto Guerra Fontes
- Piauí: Guilherme Cavalcante de Melo
- Rio de Janeiro: Nilo Batista
- Rio Grande do Norte: Vivaldo Costa
- Rio Grande do Sul: João Gilberto Lucas Coelho
- Rondônia: Assis Canuto
- Roraima: Antônio Airton Oliveira Dias
- Santa Catarina: Antônio Carlos Konder Reis
- São Paulo: Aloysio Nunes
- Sergipe: José Carlos Mesquita Teixeira
- Tocantins: Paulo Sidnei Antunes

== Events ==
=== April ===
- April 6-11: A boy, named Evandro Ramos Caetano disappears in Guaratuba, Paraná. His body would later be found five days later in a forest in the city, without several organs, as well as amputated hands and feet. This case would have great repercussions in the country during the 1990s.

=== May ===
- May 11: Four stars, representing the states of Amapá, Roraima, Rondônia e Tocantins, founded in the last 10 years, are added to the flag of Brazil.
- May 17: The governor of Acre, Edmundo Pinto is assassinated, after being shot twice in a hotel apartment in São Paulo.

=== June ===
- June 3–14: Earth Summit in Rio de Janeiro.
- June 5: Convention on Biological Diversity in Rio de Janeiro.

=== August ===
- August 16: Protesters, from the Caras-Pintadas movement, take to the streets across the country to ask for the departure of President Fernando Collor de Mello.
- August 23: A special commission in Brazil concludes that there is sufficient evidence to begin impeachment proceedings against President Fernando Collor de Mello, finding he had accepted millions of dollars' worth of illegal payments from business interests.

=== September ===
- September 29: After a series of protests and accusations of corruption, president Fernando Collor de Mello is impeached and removed from congress and his powers are suspended. Itamar Franco becomes the acting president.

=== October ===
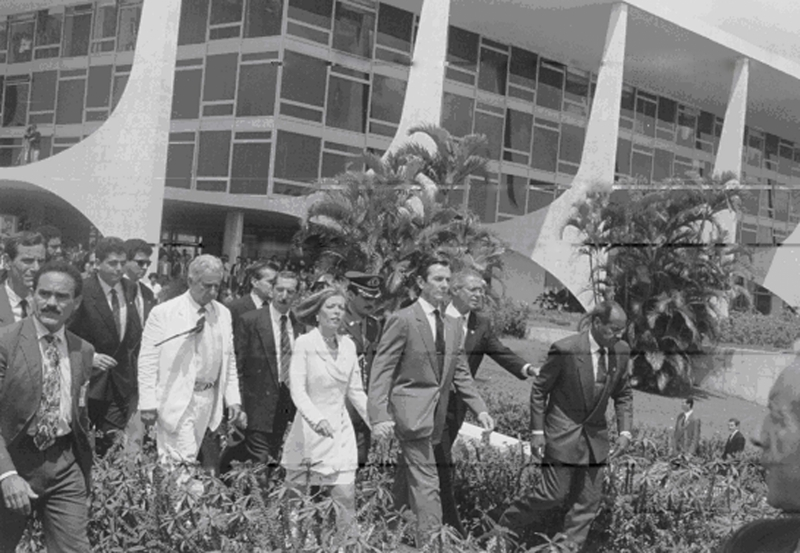
President Collor leaving the presidency.

- October 2: The Military Police of the State of São Paulo, led by Colonel Ubiratan Guimarães, kill 111 prisoners during a rebellion, in the Carandiru Penitentiary, in São Paulo.
- October 12: Politician Ulysses Guimarães dies in a helicopter crash, off Angra dos Reis in Rio de Janeiro.

=== December ===
- December 28: Actress Daniella Perez is murdered in Rio de Janeiro, after being stabbed 18 times with scissors by actor Guilherme de Pádua and his then-wife Paula Thomaz. The crime shocked the nation, due to both the victim and the murderer being romantic partners in the telenovela De Corpo e Alma, which aired on TV Globo.
- December 29: Brazil's president Fernando Collor de Mello is found guilty on charges that he stole more than $32 million from the government, preventing him from holding any elected office for eight years. Collor resigns the presidency hours before the sentence to be passed by the Supreme Federal Court.
- December 31: The program Xou da Xuxa comes to an end. It is considered to be the most successful children's show in Brazilian television history and would consecrate Xuxa Meneghel.

=== Date unknown ===
- Quaternaglia Guitar Quartet is founded.
- The Professor Paulo Neves de Carvalho Government School is established.

== Television ==
- Você Decide debuts.
- Felicidade ends.

== Music ==
- The bands Charlie Brown Jr., Dazaranha, É o Tchan!, Os Travessos and Pato Fu are formed.

== Sport ==
- 1992 in Brazilian football
- 1992 Brazilian Grand Prix
- 1992 Brazilian motorcycle Grand Prix
- 1992 Maceió Open
- 1992 Recopa Sudamericana
- 1992 South American Cross Country Championships held in São Paulo.
- Brazil at the 1992 Summer Olympics
- Brazil at the 1992 Winter Olympics
- Associação Desportiva Guarujá, Atlético Clube Lagartense, Misto Esporte Clube, Osasco Futebol Clube Associação Desportiva Perilima, Serra Macaense Futebol Clube, Tubarão Futebol Clube and Veranópolis Esporte Clube Recreativo e Cultural are founded.

== Births ==
=== January ===
- January 1: Graciele Herrmann, swimmer
- January 6: Rodrigo Simas, actor
- January 7: Dudu, footballer

=== February ===
- February 5: Neymar, footballer
- February 23: Casemiro, footballer

=== June ===
- June 12: Philippe Coutinho, footballer
- June 30: Chay Suede, actor, singer, and composer

=== August ===
- August 13: Lucas Moura, footballer
- August 20: Carolina Horta, beach volleyball player
- August 21: Felipe Nasr, racing driver
- August 29: Oliver Minatel, footballer

=== October ===
- October 2: Alisson, footballer
- October 30: MC Daleste, singer, songwriter and rapper (died 2013)

=== November ===
- November 17: Damiris Dantas, basketball player

=== December ===
- December 15: Alex Telles, footballer
- December 21: Isabelle Nogueira, dancer

== Deaths ==
=== February ===
- February 16: Jânio Quadros, 22nd President of Brazil (born 1917)

=== March ===
- March 7: Paulo Machado de Carvalho, journalist, TV businessman, football chairman and leader of Brazilian delegation in the 1958 FIFA World Cup and the 1962 FIFA World Cup (born 1901)
- March 13: Sister Dulce, Catholic Franciscan Sister (born 1914)

=== May ===
- May 24: Luiz Eça, samba and bossa nova pianist (born 1936)

=== August ===
- August 2: Otto Bumbel, football player and manager (born 1914)
- August 14: Russinho, footballer (born 1902)

=== September ===
- September 17: Herivelto Martins, composer and singer (born 1912)

=== October ===
- October 12: Ulysses Guimarães, politician (born 1916)

=== December ===
- December 12: Togo Renan Soares, basketball coach (born 1906)
- December 28: Daniella Perez, actress (born 1970)

== See also ==
- 1992 in Brazilian football
- 1992 in Brazilian television
