= Altamira child emasculations =

1989–1993 episode of crimes in Brazil

- Location of Altamira in Pará
- Location: Altamira, Pará, northern Brazil
- Date: 1989–93
- Attack type: Satanic/black magic ritualistic torture and murder
- Weapon: Handmade blades
- Victims: 6 boys aged 8–14 (killed); 3 boys aged 8–10 (maimed); 3 boys aged 8–13 (disappeared)
- Perpetrator: "Superior Universal Lineage" sect
- Motive: Ritual sacrifice (presumed)

The Altamira child emasculations were series of crimes that occurred in the municipality of Altamira, in Pará, Brazil, which involved boys aged 8–14. They were kidnapped, maimed and killed between 1989 and 1993. According to the Pará authorities, the crimes were committed for the purpose of satanic rituals and black magic, promoted by the "Superior Universal Lineage" sect, an occult organization that, among other things, challenged the Western idea of divinity and believed that children were tools of a false god. However, after the case was closed, Maranhão police arrested Francisco das Chagas Rodrigues de Brito, a serial killer who claimed 42 murders committed against children, including 12 in Altamira, which brought uncertainty over the judicial outcome. The accused, who have always claimed to have no involvement with the crimes, asked the court to reinvestigate the cases. Due to the level of violence, the case quickly generated mainstream attention and international repercussion.

== Victims ==
The victims were young boys, aged between 8 and 14, who lived in Altamira. They were found naked, castrated and with signs of sexual violence. Some had burns, and even their eyes gouged out.

=== Deaths ===
- Ailton Fonseca, 10: On May 5, 1991, a police report was registered about his disappearance. His remains were found 46 days later. His body was taken to the morgue in Belém, but disappeared before it could be examined.
- Jurdiley da Cunha, 13: On January 1, 1992, the boy socialized with an unknown individual at a site and then disappeared. His body was found days later naked, castrated, with signs of sexual violence, perforations and burns.
- Ednaldo de Souza Teixeira, 12: Killed on April 11, 1992. His body was found beside an artesian well with signs of being beaten.
- Jaenes da Silva Pessoa, 13: Murdered on October 1, 1992, while taking care of his family's cattle. His body was found days later, castrated, with signs of sexual abuse and torture. He also had his eyes gouged out and his hands chopped off.
- Klebson Ferreira Caldas, 13: Found murdered on November 17, 1992. He was naked, castrated and showed signs of torture.
- Flávio Lopes da Silva, 10: Went missing on March 27, 1993. His body was found days later with signs of torture and injury to the genitals. He had human bite marks on his body, had his glans penis cut off and his scrotum torn out.

=== Injured ===
- Joseph, 8: Attacked on August 2, 1989, after he left his residence and was enticed by a man. The boy was found hours later, with injuries and signs of sexual abuse.
- Otoniel, 10: On November 16, 1989, the boy was approached by a man who invited him to eat mangoes. After a long walk, the criminal put a strong-smelling cloth over his face, making him pass out. When he woke up, he noticed that he was bleeding between his legs. Currently, Otoniel lives in Altamira with his mother and is undergoing psychological treatment. He underwent dozens of surgeries for genital implantation and reconstruction.
- Waldicley, 9: On July 23, 1990, a stranger invited him to help him get a kite down from a tree. In the woods, the man put a cloth over his face and made him pass out. Waldicley was castrated and then sexually abused. When he woke up, he went to find help. Like Otoniel, he had to undergo several reconstructive surgeries and psychological treatment.

=== Missing ===
- Tito Mendes, 13: On January 20, 1991, the boy went to swim in the Tres Pontes stream before going to buy some mangoes. Before disappearing, he was seen by a witness in the company of an unknown man.
- JCB, 11: Disappeared on August 21, 1991. The case was dismissed at the time for lack of clues.
- Maurício Farias de Souza, 12: On December 27, 1992, the boy went to pick up a payment from a woman he worked for. He was last seen in the company of a man on a red bicycle.
- Renan Santos de Souza, 9: On January 23, 1993, the boy went out to play on the banks of the Chingu River. He was last seen in the company of two men.
- RFS, 11: On July 9, 1993, the boy, who was a shoeshiner, left his tools in a supermarket, which he normally did not do. Since then, he has not been located. Months earlier, the boy's brother had escaped an abduction attempt.

== Investigation ==
Due to the high level of violence, the crimes reached widespread attention. The subsequent investigation was led by Civil Police Chief Éder Mauro. Initially, the murders were not linked to each other, which led to many of them being abandoned for lack of evidence.

=== First arrest ===
In 1990, after the first investigations were completed, the Pará police arrested Rotílio de Souza, a drifter who wandered through the city streets. Investigators truly believed he was responsible, but De Souza died in prison under suspicious circumstances some months later. However, the occurrence of new deaths with the same characteristics as the previous ones showed that he was not the perpetrator, and the investigation resumed.

=== Alleged organ trafficking ring ===
Work resumed and other lines of investigation were followed. One of them maintained the existence of an alleged gang of traffickers who were kidnapping the city's children to extract their organs. For the police, the manner in which the cuts were induced indicated clinical motivation, besides the possible participation of doctors. The recent move of two doctors to the city caught the attention of investigators: they were Anísio Ferreira de Sousa and Césio Brandão, who had moved to Altamira in 1990. Both were detained for clarification. However, expert reports proved that as they were extracted, the organs were unusable for transportation purposes. Without sufficient evidence, the doctors were released and the case went cold.

=== "Superior Universal Lineage" sect ===
In 1993, the researchers reopened the case and rearrested De Sousa and Brandão again. According to witnesses, these men participated in a sect called the "Superior Universal Lineage", an occult organization that, among other things, challenged the Western idea of divinity and preached caution in living with children. In a book called "God, the Great Scam", the sect's founder, Valentina de Andrade, stated: "...Watch out for children, they are unconscious instruments of the great scam called God and his evil collaborators...". The text also called children "violent", and recommended paying special attention to those born after 1981.

Due to its eccentric religious philosophy, the organization was investigated in Paraná for alleged involvement of the kidnapping and murder of Evandro Ramos Caetano in 1992, a case also known as the Evandro case. At that time, searches were carried out on Valentina's estate, where hoods and videos were found, in which, according to police, she in a trance said: "...kill little children...". However, experts found that the expression used was actually "...yes...but there are more experienced little children...". In view of this, the material was disregarded and Valentina's name was removed from the judicial inquiry. She claimed to have never worked with the organization in Brazil, and had visited Altamira only a few times, the last time being in 1987.

=== Indictment ===
Based on this evidence and having no other lines of investigation, Éder Mauro closed the case and concluded that the murders were committed by sect participants during rituals of Satanism and black magic. The indictment forwarded to the prosecution was based solely on data gathered from previous investigations and witness testimony. According to the investigators, 74-year-old Agostinho José da Costa would have seen Dr. Brandão on the Trans-Amazonian Highway carrying a styrofoam box and a bloodstained machete. Another witness, named Edmilson da Silva Frazão, reported to have attended a "satanic cult" at De Sousa's house in 1991, where he would have seen Valentina de Andrade. In all, the investigation indicted 7 people for allegedly participating in the crimes.

- Anísio Ferreira de Sousa: doctor and spiritualist. Accused of doing the castrations. Witnesses would have seen him praying to the "god of darkness". According to police, as not to arouse suspicion, the doctor treated residents of the region for affordable prices. He also provided free housing, as well as making campaigns to raise donations to help needy families.
- Césio Brandão: doctor. Indicted based on witness testimony, and also alleged to have done the castrations. He had a temporary arrest issued on July 9, 1993, later converted to a preventative one. He remained in a Bélem prison for two years until he obtained a habeas corpus, to await trial in freedom.
- Amaílton Madeira Gomes: Heir to several farms and gas stations. According to investigators, it was him who attracted and raped the boys. Witnesses would have seen him with a bloodstained shirt upon the disappearance of one of the victims.
- Carlos Alberto Santos Lima: military policeman, working as a security guard at a gas station belonging to Gomes. According to investigators, he himself confessed to being part of the criminal group.
- Aldenor Ferreira Cardoso: military policeman. Accused of providing security to the sect.
- José Amadeus Gomes: Amaílton's father, accused of masterminding the murders committed by the doctors. According to police, he practised the rituals for financial gain.
- Valentina de Andrade: the sect leader and intellectual mentor for the homicides.

Among the defendants, only José Amadeus Gomes and Valentina de Andrade had no pre-trial detention and were allowed to walk free until their trials. The police investigation had several flaws: no autopsies were performed on the corpses, no forensic examinations were performed on the body locations and there was no evidence connecting any of the accused to the crimes. However, on September 6, 1993, the indictment was accepted by the prosecutor and the complaint was forwarded to the judiciary, where it was accepted by Judge Orlando Arrifano. From then on, the judicial process against the accused began.

== Lawsuit ==
Due to the nature of the complaint, the court case against the seven defendants was referred to the jury. The Brazilian constitution establishes that it is up to this court to adjudicate cases involving intentional crimes against life. However, in order to reach the trial stage, the law states that the complaint must be approved in the so-called "investigation stage", where the target of the trial is not the accused party, but the probative structure of the prosecution.

=== Investigation phase ===
This phase of the process was long and controversial. On several occasions, decisions taken in Altamira were revoked at higher levels, leading to the resumption of the process. Three different magistrates participated in this phase: Orlando Arrifano, Roberto Vieira and Ernane Ferreira Malato.

=== Investigation by Arrifano ===
On September 10, 1993, the complaint against the seven accused was offered to the judiciary. The then-responsible for the third criminal court for the district of Altamira, Orlando Arrifano, accepted the complaint and initiated the investigation phase, calling for testimony from the witnesses and informants.

=== Instruction hearings ===
Among the witnesses summoned was Duilio Nolasco Pereira, former husband of Valentina de Andrade and owner of a hotel in Altamira. On November 30, 1993, Duilio testified to seeing Valentina in town, touring with a group of friends, in 1986. What also caught his attention was the way these friends revered the way she sat or got up.

In early 1994, upon hearing the case, the chief prosecutor, Roberto Pinho, dismissed the defendants for lack of evidence. The assistant prosecutor Antonio Cesar Brito Ferreira rebutted Pinho's arguments and summoned Frazão's testimony, a key witness in the inquiry. Then, on May 17, 1994, Edmilson reiterated his previous testimony given in the police investigation. However, he contradicted himself when he could not say when the alleged acts occurred: when asked, he cited 1989 or 1990. In his first statement, he claimed that it had happened in 1991. Still, Judge Arrifano found the statement satisfactory, and on June 20, contrary to the prosecutor's wishes, pronounced the accused as guilty.

The judge's decision was challenged by the defense team, who filed an appeal to the state court. On November 21, 1994, a prosecutor named Castelo Branco accepted the appeal, due to the lack of evidence for the conviction. When the decision was published, several social groups organized in Bélem and promoted large mobilizations. There was also the symbolic burial of the Altamira chief prosecutor who, fearing for his safety, had to leave the city. Under pressure, on December 22, the three judges voted to maintain the arrest of the suspects and continue the process. The judicial proceeding was at an advanced stage, only awaiting a date for the defendants' jury trial.

=== Supreme Court annuls part of the trial ===
On March 24, 1995, Edmilson da Silva Frazão surprised the court by requesting a new hearing. In his new testimony, he refuted everything he had previously, claiming that he had been under pressure from the Federal Police. Three days later, Edmilson returned to the court and reaffirmed his statements, claiming that he was urged and coerced to give further testimony by three men, named Hercilio, Arnaldo and Amadeu, which offered him money and he could not refuse. Accordingly, the defense lawyers sent a habeas corpus application to the Federal Supreme Court, alleging that Judge Arrifano was partially judging the case, which made the right of defense impossible. The Second Panel acknowledged irregularities in the case, and issued a request to the state court, ordering the hearing of new defense statements, which reopened the investigation phase and nullified the defendants' conviction. However, the habeas corpus was not granted. On August 22, 1995, the First Chamber of the State Court of Justice decided to revoke the remand of Césio Brandão, who was held for more than two years in Bélem. After the decision, Brandão declared his intention to sue the state, claiming to have been used as a scapegoat by authorities to hide flaws in the investigation process. On September 12, the other defendants were also released, following the same line as Césio's lawyers.

== See also ==
- Francisco das Chagas Rodrigues de Brito
- List of solved missing person cases: 1990s
- Maranhão child emasculations
