= Renné Senna case =

Murder of former farmer Renné Senna

- Location: Arraial do Cabo, Lagos Region, Rio Bonito, Rio de Janeiro, Brazil
- Date: January 7, 2007; 19 years ago Around 11:00 (BRST (UTC-2))
- Target: Renné Senna
- Attack type: Armed robbery
- Weapon: Firearm
- Deaths: 1
- Victim: Renné Senna
- Accused: Janaína Oliveira, Robson de Andrade Oliveira and Ednei Gonçalves Pereira, Marco Antonio Vicente, Ronaldo Amaral and Anderson Souza

The Renné Senna case refers to the killing of former farmer Renné Senna (1953–2007), who won 52 million reais in the Mega-Sena in July 2005 and was murdered on January 7, 2007, with four shots in a bar in Rio Bonito (RJ). The widow, Adriana Almeida (who was given the pejorative nickname of "Blonde Mare") was 25 years younger than Senna and was identified by the police as the mastermind of the crime, supposedly motivated by her inheritance . The case was closed in December 2016, when Adriana Almeida was sentenced to 20 years in prison for double murder.

== The background to the crime ==
In July 2005 Renné Senna saw his life change when he won 52 million reais in the Mega-Sena contest 679. He soon bought a quadricycle for 19 thousand reais, and gave real estate to her brothers. After the award, he tried to change neighborhoods and went to Recreio dos Bandeirantes, a neighborhood in Rio de Janeiro. He did not adapt and returned to Rio Bonito, which was said to be the best place in the world to live. He built himself a house for 9 million reais, where he closely followed the creation of 846 heads of cattle and 12 horses. He walked around with security guards because he was afraid of being kidnapped, but he didn't change his habits. He continued drinking in the bars of Rio Bonito and talking with old friends."Renné was a saint. There were people who took advantage of that", said Olívio Ferreira, a trader in the center of Rio Bonito. According to him, it was not uncommon for someone, after a conversation with Renné, to leave with R$10,000.

His wife Adriana, on the other hand, changed completely after her marriage to Renné, in 2006: she stopped working and started driving around in a Mercedes-Benz car, always accompanied by security guards. She spent much of her time at a gym. She had breast implants, dyed her hair blonde and, when she was arrested, wore sunglasses and dressed similarly to former model Daniella Cicarelli . According to a former employee at the farm, Adriana forced Renné to fire the workers and hire other security guards. Her relatives were employed with salaries of R$5,000 for ordinary tasks on the farm. "Meanwhile, she wouldn't even let his relatives go there," said the former employee.

For Adriana, Renné modified his will. The eleven brothers and the daughter, previously the only beneficiaries, now had to share the inheritance with her in the event of his death. Four days before the crime, Renné, in regular consultation with the manager of the bank where he had the money deposited, discovered that Adriana had withdrawn BRL 300,000 from the couple's joint account to buy a penthouse in Arraial do Cabo, in the Lagos Region, in Rio de Janeiro. Unaware of the negotiation and suspicious of his wife's infidelity, Renné allegedly started an argument, which resulted in the widow leaving the house the next day. He would have warned her that he would remove her name from the will.

== The crime ==
On the morning of January 7, 2007, Renné was at Penco's bar without security guards, close to the farm, when two hooded men arrived on a motorcycle and the passenger shot Renné, killing him instantly. The bullets hit the back of the head, the left temple, the left eye and the millionaire's chin. The possibility of robbery was ruled out by the police, as the killers left Renné's watch and gold ring. His fanny pack, however, was stolen by the bandits. On the day of the crime, the first accusations against the widow arose, coming from the dead man's family: she had spent New Year's Eve with her lover in a penthouse in Arraial do Cabo .

== Accusations to the widow ==
On January 9, 2007, the ex-farmer's daughter, Renata de Almeida Senna, told the police that the murder was ordered by Adriana Almeida, the widow. Soon after, Renné Senna's sister, Jocimar Conceição da Rocha, also said she believed that Adriana ordered the crime. “She was the only one interested”, said the housewife who also stated that Adriana distanced Renné from the brothers.

== The Crime Investigations ==
The police inquiry was closed on March 26, 2007, pointing Adriana Almeida as the mastermind of the crime. Police investigations led to the arrest of seven people for the murder of the millionaire: Adriana, physical education teacher Janaína Oliveira, van driver Robson de Andrade Oliveira and former security guards Ednei Gonçalves Pereira, Marco Antonio Vicente, Ronaldo Amaral and Anderson Souza. Anderson would have been the author of the shots that killed the millionaire.

Two of these men were Adriana's lovers. One of them, Robson de Andrade Oliveira, owner of a passenger transport van, confessed the romance to the authorities. On her cell phone, Adriana's phones were identified with the nickname “Égua Loura”. Not satisfied with making public an intimate nickname, Robson spiced up the story further by revealing that millionaire Renné Senna was impotent.

The police stated that before the murder Adriana had been demonstrating non-standard behavior. On the day of the crime, she demanded the invoice from a supermarket, something she never did. The police concluded that she wanted to use the receipt as an alibi. The widow had bought a penthouse in Arraial do Cabo, in the Lagos region, for R$300 thousand. There she used to meet with her lover. Adriana was in a hurry to furnish the property. As the store that sold the appliances asked for a week for delivery, she rented a truck and took everything on the same day. One of Renné's brothers, Alcimar Santos, said that the millionaire would have discovered the romance and kicked the widow out of the house, a few days before he died. Therefore, she would be setting up a house to live in. And according to the police, a few days after her husband's murder, she went back to frequenting motels with her lovers.

But the police also concluded that Adriana had plotted with one of her lovers, Renné's bodyguard, to kidnap her husband. Renné would have discovered the plan and, therefore, was murdered. That lover, former military police officer Anderson Silva Souza, is also a suspect in the September murder of David Vilhena, Renné's most trusted security guard. According to police, Vilhena was investigating Anderson's background when he was murdered .

== Arrest and release of Adriana Almeida ==
Adriana was captured on January 29, 2007, accused of planning her husband's death. Hostilized in Rio Bonito, she twice escaped being lynched. She won a habeas-corpus from the Fifth Panel of the Superior Court of Justice (STJ) on June 27, 2008, due to the excessive term of the temporary prison.

== Progress of the process ==
On July 9, 2009, after more than 72 hours of trial and the testimony of ten witnesses, the Jury Court of Rio Bonito condemned, by 4 votes to 3 of the jurors, two former security guards accused of the death of René Senna on 18 years in prison under closed regime, Anderson Silva Sousa and Ednei Gonçalves Pereira.

After spending more than a year in prison, four of the suspects respond to the process in freedom. Anderson de Souza, accused of being the author of the shots, and Edney Gonçalves Pereira, who was on the motorcycle that was used on the day of the crime, are still being arrested.

Adriana Almeida already had four different lawyers throughout the process. In addition to the nickname "Blonde Mare", she was also known as "the widow of Mega-Sena".

== Developments ==
On February 24, 2010, at the 119th DP (Rio Bonito), Adriana Almeida registered a theft that allegedly took place at Fazenda Nossa Senhora da Conceição, which belonged to millionaire Renné Senna . According to Deputy Nilton Silva, Adriana recorded at the police station that appliances were taken – including a refrigerator, a freezer and a minibar – in addition to a TV, clothes and an ATV that the millionaire, who was physically disabled, used to get around. There are still no suspects in the alleged crime. "It would take a truck or a very large car to transport what she reported to have been stolen", said the delegate.

Adriana told the police that she lives on the farm, where she would have spent Carnival, but that she wasn't going there often because there would be water problems.

== Judgement ==
After five days of judgment, hairdresser Adriana Almeida, who was accused of planning the death of her husband René Sena, a former farmer who became a millionaire after winning the Mega-Sena prize in 2005, was acquitted early this Saturday (3–12 -2011). The sentence was read by Judge Roberta dos Santos Braga Costa, at the Jury Court (TJ), at the Rio Bonito Forum, in the Baixada Litorânea do Rio de Janeiro. Three other defendants were also acquitted.

PROCESS UPDATE : In view of this result, the TJRJ, some time later, provided an appeal from the Public Prosecutor's Office, annulling the acquittal trial and ordering another. The Defense filed a special appeal with the STJ, which was rejected on technical grounds, sending the case back to the origin to comply with the decision. In the meantime, the Defense also filed a Habeas Corpus at the STJ, but Minister Félix Fischer denied it the granting of an injunction aimed at suspending the new trial until the final appreciation of the HC. It was argued about the sovereignty of the decisions of the Judgment Council, which must be preserved, notably in view of the fragility that integrates the TJRJ pronouncement, honoring the accusatory version, when the Jury decided to accept the defensive thesis – both with evidentiary support. Now the most delicate decision is in the hands of the Judge-President of the Jury of Rio Bonito – RJ: prompt attention is given to the determination by the TJRJ, setting the new date, as the HC in the STJ does not have suspensive effect; or, out of caution, in the face of a specific case that requires great mobilization to carry out the new trial session, decides to wait for the outcome of the HC in the STJ, given the harmfulness in the event of its granting, perhaps Adriana will be convicted in this new trial, because, again, a solemn act of this magnitude will remain unsupported. However, if acquitted, this decision will result in the emptying of the content of the HC-STJ. The risk in both situations is latent, since we all know how a process begins, but no one has the power or authority to advance the merit of culpability. Anyway, there are three hypotheses for this case to be definitively closed and archived: A) if convicted in the new trial, Adriana will not have the right to appeal on the merits of the accusation, only in case of eventual nullity in the execution of it; B) if acquitted, it is the Public Prosecutor's Office that will not be entitled to a second appeal on the merits, except in the case of new nullities; c) if one of the two hypotheses occurs, if the STJ denies the Habeas Corpus, with Adriana being condemned for the death of her ex-husband, she will comply with her reprimand and will no longer have recourse to file; and if she is acquitted, the Habeas Corpus will be considered impaired. it is the Public Prosecutor's Office that will not be entitled to a second appeal on the merits, except in the case of new nullities; c) if one of the two hypotheses occurs, if the STJ denies the Habeas Corpus, with Adriana being condemned for the death of her ex-husband, she will comply with her reprimand and will no longer have recourse to file; and if it is acquitted, the Habeas Corpus will be considered impaired. it is the Public Prosecutor's Office that will not be entitled to a second appeal on the merits, except in the case of new nullities; c) if one of the two hypotheses occurs, if the STJ denies the Habeas Corpus, with Adriana being condemned for the death of her ex-husband, she will comply with her reprimand and will no longer have recourse to file; and if it is acquitted, the Habeas Corpus will be considered impaired.

== Attempted agreement ==
In 2013, Adriana Ferreira Almeida tried to settle an agreement with Renê's only daughter, Renata Sena, in court. Adriana proposed the extinction of the shares of both parties and the equal division into two parts of the fortune left by the victim, today ^{[ when? ]} valued at more than R$100 million. Renata's lawyer, Marcus Rangoni, said that the daughter of the Mega-Sena prize winner did not accept the proposal and that the denial of the agreement offered by Adriana and her lawyer has already been presented. "We will not accept the proposed agreement. You don't sit down at the table to negotiate with the person you are convinced murdered your father", said the lawyer.

== New trial and final punishment ==
On December 16, 2016, Adriana Almeida known as "the Mega Sena widow" was sentenced to 20 years in prison. The inheritance of 52 million and the millionaire's assets will go to Renné's only daughter, Renata Senna.

OUTCOME TJ annuls millionaire's will that benefited Widow da Mega-Sena.

Judges from the 17th Civil Chamber of the Rio Court of Justice annulled the will of millionaire Renné Senna, murdered in 2007 after winning R$52 million in the Mega Sena. The process runs in secrecy of Justice. The document benefited former hairdresser Adriana Ferreira Almeida, Renné's widow sentenced in December 2016 to 20 years in prison for her husband's murder. The inheritance, of more than R$100 million, was disputed by Adriana and the victim's 11 brothers.

The will left 50% of the fortune to Renné's only daughter and the other half to Adriana Almeida. The millionaire's brothers went to court to enforce the previous will, which allocated 50% of the assets to their daughter and the rest in different percentages to them. The defense of the millionaire's brothers claimed that the will that benefited Adriana was the product of fraud, made only to benefit her.

According to the lawyer Sebastião Mendonça, who represents Renné's brothers, Adriana "was interested in the drawing up of the will, as well as in the death of the testator, so much so that she was condemned by the Jury Court of Rio Bonito, making her unworthy of being beneficiary of the will.

Former farmer Renê Senna was shot to death on January 7, 2007, in Rio Bonito, in the Metropolitan Region of Rio. Six people were accused of the crime, including the victim's widow. According to the Public Prosecutor's Office, Adriana would have ordered her husband's death after he said he was going to exclude her from the will, as she knew he was being betrayed.

Adriana was acquitted in 2011, but the sentence was annulled in 2014 by the Court of Justice. That's because the driver Otávio dos Santos Pereira, son-in-law of the millionaire, denounced breach of incommunicability of two jurors. According to the Code of Criminal Procedure, in these cases, the nullity of the trial is decreed, since the jurors cannot have contact with each other, with witnesses or with the outside world, to avoid being influenced. They would have gone to a gas station opposite the hotel.

Five years later, in December 2016, Adriana was tried again. In a statement given in court, she said that she liked her partner but admitted that she had had a lover for months before Renné's death. Adriana also said that she did not know that she was in the millionaire's will, entitled to half of everything he left. The Jury Court of Rio Bonito sentenced the widow to 20 years in prison for the crime. Adriana is currently serving her sentence under house arrest.
