= Maranhão child emasculations =

Serial murders in Brazil

The Maranhão child emasculations (also known as the Black Magic Murders of Maranhao) refers to a series of crimes that occurred in Paço do Lumiar, São José de Ribamar, Codó and São Luís, in the state of Maranhão, Brazil, which involved boys aged 4–15. They were kidnapped, maimed and killed between 1991 and 2003.

== History ==
=== Crimes ===
According to the Maranhão judge, the crimes were committed by Francisco das Chagas Rodrigues de Brito, arrested in December 2003 in the municipality of São Luís. Scientific evidence proved him to be the perpetrator of the crimes when experts located various bodies, limbs and other pieces from missing boys in his residence. Evidence also suggests he was responsible for a series of similar murders with the same modus operandi that occurred in Altamira, coupled with the fact that he lived there for 10 years.

=== Repercussion ===
The case reached an international dimension when, in the midst of investigations, non-governmental organizations denounced Brazil to the Organization of American States, claiming that the country had failed to protect the human rights of the victims and their families. Subsequently, by agreement between both parties, the Brazilian government compensated each family and developed new programs to protect the rights of children and adolescents.
