= Caixa Econômica Federal =

Brazilian government-owned financial institution

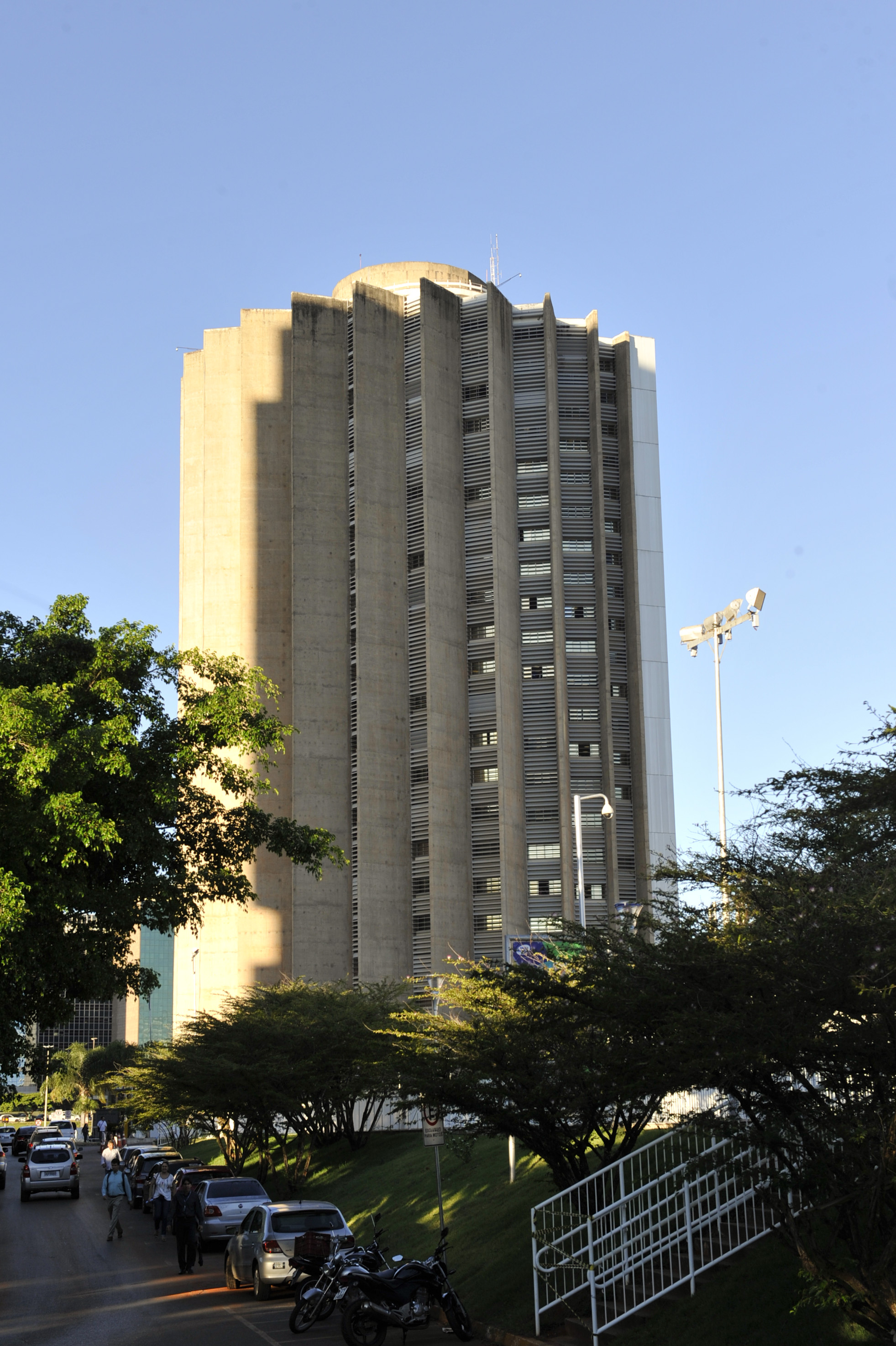
- Headquarters in Brasília
- Type: Government-owned corporation
- Industry: Financial services
- Founded: 12 January 1861; 165 years ago in Rio de Janeiro, Neutral Municipality, Brazilian Empire
- Founder: Emperor Pedro II
- Headquarters: Brasília, Federal District, Brazil
- Key people: Carlos Vieira Fernandes (Chairperson)
- Products: Banking and gambling
- Net income: ▲ R$ 17.3 billion (2021)
- Total assets: ▲ R$ 2.422 trillion (2021)
- Number of employees: 86,000 (2021)
- Parent: Brazilian Government
- Website: www.caixa.gov.br

The Caixa Econômica Federal (Portuguese pronunciation: [ˈkajʃɐ ekoˈnõmikɐ fedeˈɾaw], Federal Savings Bank), also referred to as Caixa or CEF, is a state-owned Brazilian financial services company headquartered in Brasília, Brazil. It is the fourth largest banking institution in Brazil, as well as the fourth largest in Latin America, and the eighty-third largest bank in the world. It is also the largest 100% government-owned financial institution in Latin America.

== History ==
The bank was founded by Emperor Pedro II on 12 January 1861, as Caixa Economica e Monte de Socorro in Rio de Janeiro as a financial institution destined to collect national savings, mostly from the poor. Over the years, several similar institutions were created, until most of them were merged into present-day Caixa Econômica in 1967.

The 1970s were particularly lucrative for the bank, mostly due to its near-monopoly on savings for the poor and lower-middle classes, the management of Brazilian state (federal) lotteries and being the only lawful pawn broker in Brazil. In the 1990s, however, the scenario changed and the bank underwent a serious downsizing, in which thousands of employees lost their jobs. Part of the problem was caused by the modernization of the Brazilian banking system in the 1980s, with many other banks introducing savings accounts to their portfolios, Brazilian states being granted rights to hold their own lotteries in addition to the federal government's, a series of corruption scandals regarding lottery fraud, and the opening of the national market to foreign banks. The control of inflation also hampered the CEF's financial performance by making savings accounts less attractive.

Nowadays, Caixa is the second-biggest Brazilian bank, and with locations in thousands of Brazilian towns, ranked the third-largest financial institution in Brazil by number of branches. Caixa has more than 146 million accounts, with liabilities worth more than R$ 237.00 billion in savings or investment. Together with government pension funds and other governmental resources, Caixa controls more than R$1.80 trillion (roughly about US$630 billion). Caixa is seen as a tool for public investment and expansion of access to financial services to the Brazilian public.

The CEF is still the manager of most Brazilian lotteries, especially the most popular ones, such as Mega-Sena, Quina and Loteca (former Loteria Esportiva). The profits of Brazilian state (federal) lotteries revert to amateur sport promotion and elementary education.

== See also ==
- Fundo de Garantia do Tempo de Serviço (FGTS)
- Lotofácil
