= Lotofácil =

Brazilian lottery organized by the Caixa Econômica Federal bank

- Lotofácil logo
- Region: Brazil
- First drawing: September 29, 2003
- Regulated by: Caixa Econômica Federal
- Probability of winning: 1 in 3 268 760 (15 numbers)
- Broadcast by: RedeTV!

Lotofácil is a lottery game held in Brazil by the Caixa Econômica Federal (CEF). Its first contest was held on September 29, 2003, after a slow approval process in the National Congress. Shortly after its launch, it became the second lottery to collect the most funds for CEF after Mega-Sena. In this modality, the player must mark between fifteen and twenty numbers on the card, among the 25 available, and wins a cash prize when matching between eleven and fifteen winning numbers. The "zero-ending" contests and the special September contest, known as Lotofácil da Independência, have a prize composed of the accumulation of common drawings. The drawings are held daily, except on Sundays, since August 2020, and are broadcast live. Part of the profit collected is passed on to government social programs.

== History ==
Lotofácil was scheduled to be launched in April 2003 by Caixa Econômica Federal (CEF), "probably on the 7th", according to the then Jornal do Brasil columnist Ricardo Boechat. However, the following month he reported that there was a "powerful lobby of lottery associations" preventing the launch of Lotofácil, noting the slow progress of the proposal in Congress. The Chamber of Deputies prevented the apportionment of the money received from the bets in a re-enactment of Provisional Measure 108, impeding the proceeds from being directed to the Fome Zero program. Congressman Sebastião Madeira, the rapporteur of the major changes to the provisional measure that created the program, stated, "It is morally indefensible to create a bet that takes money from the poor, under the pretext of raising money for Fome Zero."

Lotofácil began to be sold on September 22, 2003 in all lottery retailers in Brazil, and the first draw took place on September 29. In five days, 1.2 million reais were collected from the bets and, in the first seven contests, 16,4 million reais were allocated to the government's social programs. In March 2004, the lottery was already the second largest revenue earner for CEF, only behind Mega-Sena and ahead of Quina. As of October 19, 2006, Lotofácil became a bi-weekly lottery - on Mondays and Thursdays. This was possible due to technological advances in the lotteries. In the week following the change, the lottery collected 23,2 million reais, 38% higher than the average weekly collection. In November, Lotofácil accounted for 21% of lottery collections, behind Mega-Sena.

On September 9, 2009, the price of the minimum bet increased from 1 real to 1.25, the first adjustment since its launch. In January 2012, CEF announced several changes to Lotofácil. It was announced that from the 7th of the next month, the drawings would occur three times a week: Mondays, Wednesdays, and Fridays. CEF announced the creation of a special contest, Lotofácil da Independência, and also allowed Teimosinha type bets. On October 1 of that year, Bolão Caixa was launched for several CEF lotteries, including Lotofácil. On May 10, 2014, the price went up to 1.5 real and went up to 2 reais on May 23 of the following year.

On October 31, 2019, the Federal Government authorized CEF to increase the minimum bet amount to 2.5 reais. Several changes occurred in the lottery in August 2020. The number of drawings increased to occur daily, from Monday to Saturday. Zero-ending games now have a prize pool, with 10% of Lotofácil's resources going to make up the pool. The possibility of marking 20 dozens was created, where the maximum was 18, and Teimosinha was extended to up to 24 contests. Finally, Bolão Caixa now allows up to one hundred shares for each group bet.

== Format ==
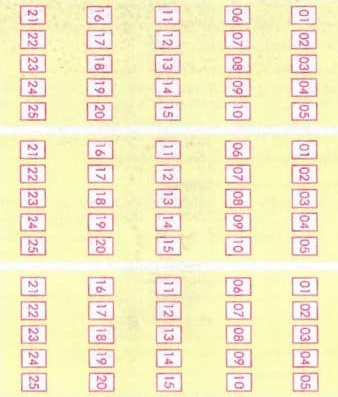
Part of a Lotofácil card. Marking quadrants two or three is optional.

Lotofácil is one of the lotteries of the CEF. In this modality, the player must mark between fifteen and twenty numbers on the card, out of the 25 available. If the player matches between eleven and fifteen numbers, they win a cash prize. The prize value depends on the amount of matched numbers. The player can also choose Surpresinha, in which a software chooses the numbers, or play Teimosinha, which allows them to compete with the same bet for three, six, twelve, eighteen, or 24 consecutive contests. Finally, there is the option of the Bolão Caixa, which allows the bettor to place group bets.

The minimum bet is fifteen numbers, with a probability of winning of 1 in 3,268,760. The bettor can add up to twenty numbers, the maximum value for a single bet, although the price of the bet increases up to 15,504 times, since the probability of winning also increases from 1 in 53,130.

=== Prize and fund raising ===
The gross prize corresponds to 43.35% of the funds raised. The following fixed prizes will be deducted from the value: five reais for the bets with eleven matched numbers (fifth group), ten reais for those with twelve matched numbers (fourth group), and 25 reais for those with thirteen matched numbers (third group). From the remaining amount, 62% will be deducted for those with fifteen matched numbers (first prize range), 13% for those with fourteen matched numbers (second prize range), 10% accumulated for those with the fifth prize range in zero-ending contests, and 15% for those with these numbers in the Lotofácil da Independência. In zero-ending contests, after deducting the fixed amounts, the remaining amount is distributed as follows: 72% for fifteen-number matches, 13% for fourteen-number matches, and 15% for the first group of the Lotofácil da Independência. In case there is no winner in any prize range, the amount accumulates for the next contest in the fifteen-hit game.

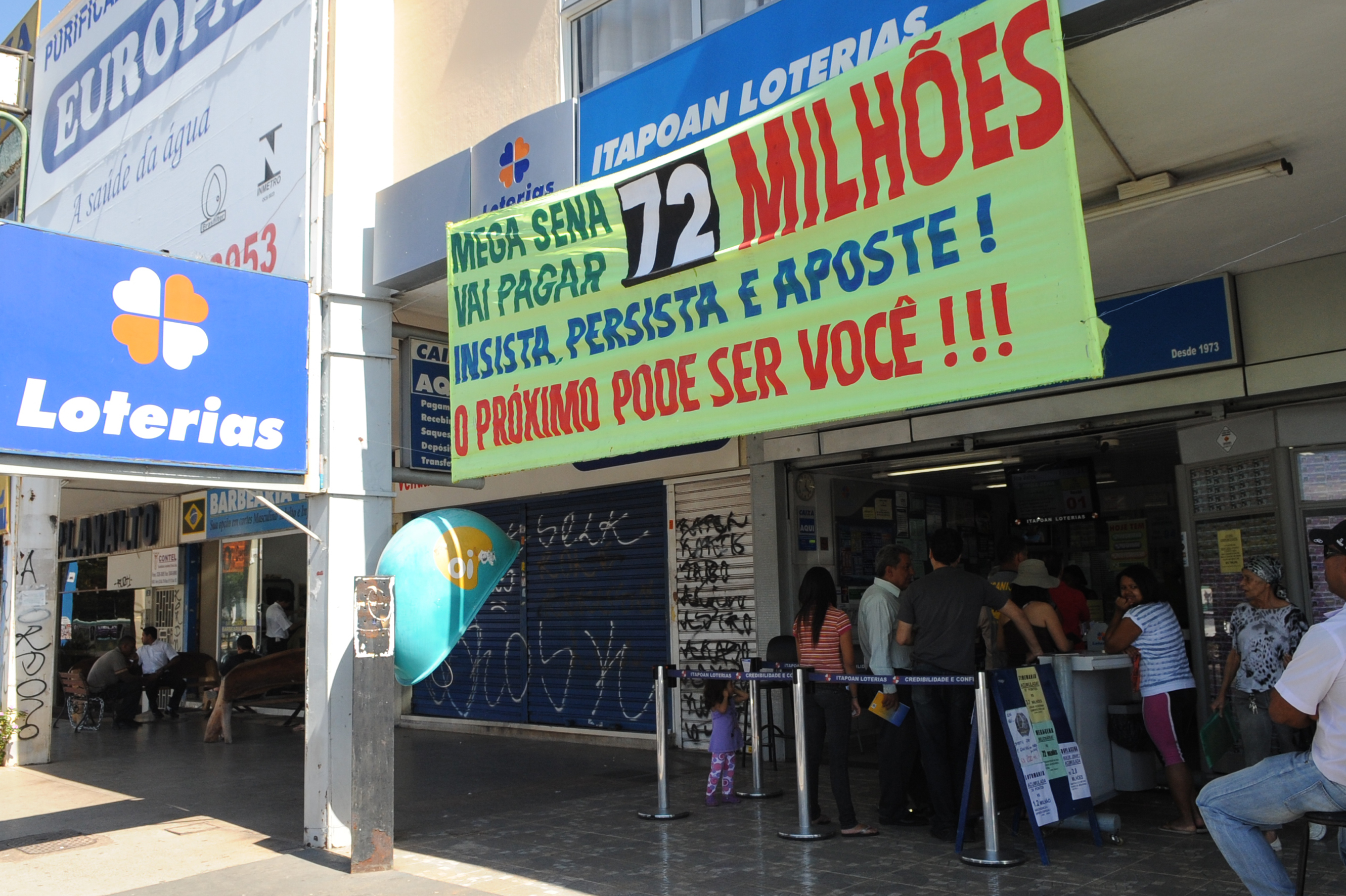
Example of a lottery retailer.

The prize can be collected at any lottery retailer (casa lotérica in Portuguese) or any of the Caixa Econômica Federal bank branches. The exception is for prizes with a gross value over 1,903.98 reais, when the collection is only allowed at Caixa branches. Prizes over ten thousand reais are paid after a minimum of two days. If the winner does not redeem the prize within ninety days after the drawing, the amounts are transferred to the Fundo de Financiamento ao Estudante do Ensino Superior (FIES). The biggest prize in the history of Lotofácil was the 2,320th Concurso da Independência drawing 159,1 million reais. The winning bet was a twelve-quota group bet. However, on September 10, 2022, the Concurso da Independência 2610 drawing drew a prize of 180 million reais, divided among 79 winning bets (15 matched answers). Adding up the prizes for 15, 14, 13, 12 and 11 matched answers, the amount reached 354,1 million Reais.

=== Drawings ===
The drawings are held from Monday to Saturday, at 8:00 pm. The drawings can take place at Espaço da Sorte ("Luck Space" in English), on Avenida Paulista, at Auditório da Caixa, in Brasília, or in other drawing facilities of Caixa, which are announced in advance on its website. The drawings held at Espaço da Sorte are broadcast. From Monday to Saturday, RedeTV! broadcasts a live modality on television. On the Internet, the drawings of all modalities are broadcast on the social networks of Caixa and RedeTV!

=== Lotofácil da Independência ===
Lotofácil da Independência is a special Lotofácil contest held annually in the month of September. Its first drawing took place in September 2012. It is marketed for thirty days, and Caixa informs in advance of the number of the contest and the date when sales begin. There is independent and concurrent betting with the other contests of the modality and use of specific flyers. Normally, 87% of the total value of the prize is destined for the first group, and 13% for the second group. In case there are no bets where fifteen numbers are matched, the prize will be divided among those who matched fourteen numbers, and so on, until the fifth group. In this case, if there are no matched guesses, the values will accumulate for the next contest, in the first prize range.

=== Price table ===
As of 26 July 2025

Price table
Number of numbers	Bet amount (R$)
15	$3.50
16	$56.00
17	$476.00
18	$2,856.00
19	$13,566.00
20	$54,264.00
