= Edmundo Pinto =

Brazilian politician and lawyer (1953–1992)

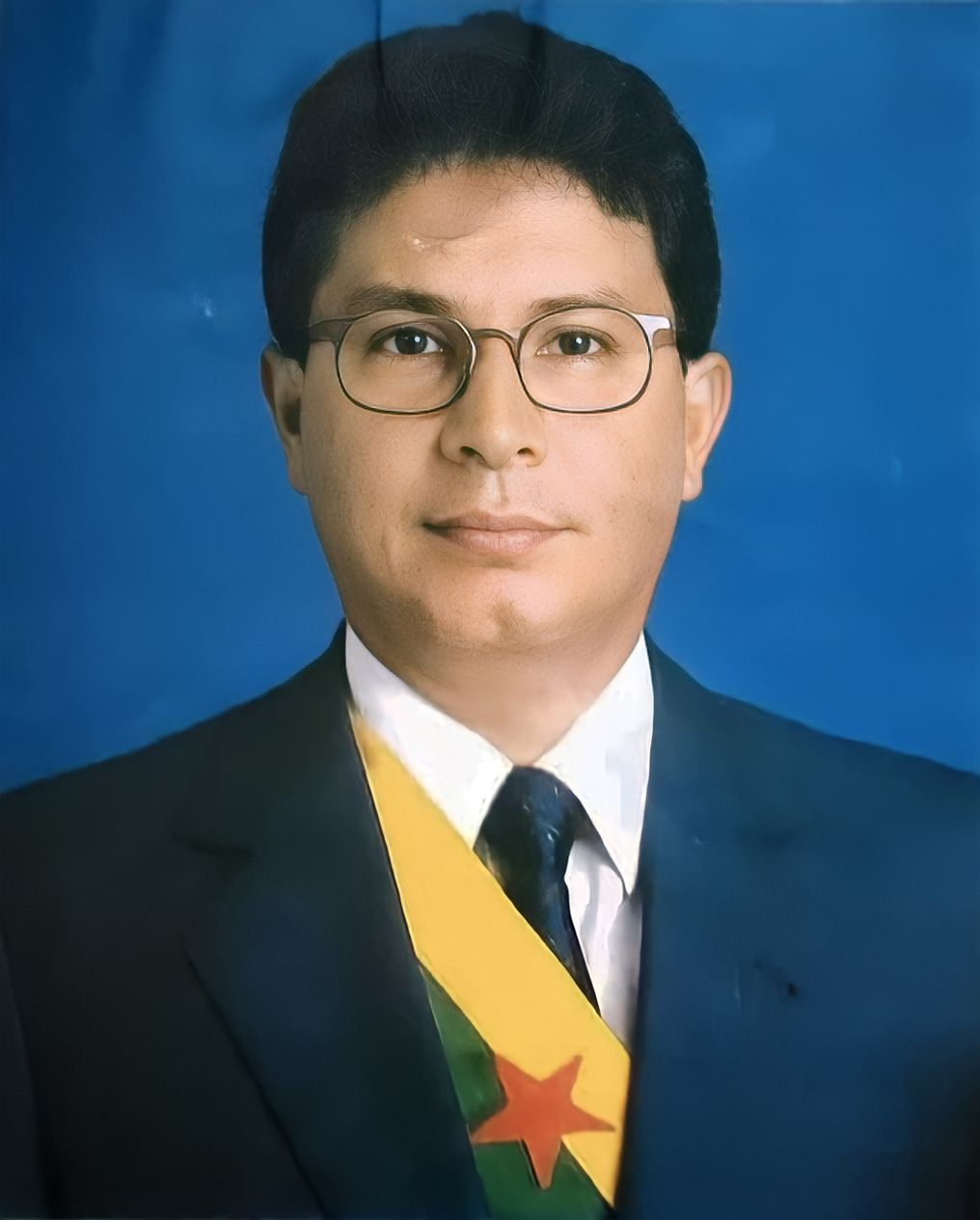
- Official portrait as governor

Governor of Acre
- In office 15 March 1991 – 17 May 1992
- Vice Governor: Romildo Magalhães
- Preceded by: Édison Cadaxo
- Succeeded by: Romildo Magalhães

State Deputy for Acre
- In office 1 February 1987 – 14 March 1991

Councilor of Rio Branco
- In office 1 January 1983 – 31 January 1987

Personal details
- Born: Edmundo Pinto de Almeida Neto; 21 June 1953 Rio Branco, Acre, Brazil
- Died: 17 May 1992 (aged 38) São Paulo, Brazil
- Manner of death: Assassination
- Party: ARENA (1973–1979); PDS (1980–1992)
- Profession: Lawyer

Edmundo Pinto de Almeida Neto (21 June 1953 – 17 May 1992) was a Brazilian lawyer and politician. He served as a governor of Acre from 1991 until his assassination in 1992.

== Early life and education ==
Edmundo Pinto de Almeida Neto was born on June 21, 1953. He is the son of Pedro Veras de Almeida and Angelina Veras de Almeida.

== Political career ==
After obtaining a Bachelor's degree in Law from the Federal University of Acre he began his political career in the ARENA party, being defeated as a candidate for state deputy in 1974 and for councilor of Rio Branco in 1976. After the end of bipartisanship during the dictatorship thanks to a political reform approved by the João Figueiredo government, Pinto joined the PDS and in 1982 was elected councilor in Rio Branco and state deputy for Acre in 1986.

In the Legislative Assembly of Acre he was an opponent of the Flaviano Melo and Édison Cadaxo governments, both from the PMDB and in 1990 he was elected governor of Acre in a dispute where he beat Jorge Viana (PT) in the second round, and was sworn in on 15 March 1991.

== Death ==
In the early hours of 17 May 1992, Pinto was shot and killed by three gunmen in apartment 707 of the Hotel Della Volpe Garden on Frei Caneca Street in São Paulo. He was 38 years old. The suspects stole Cr$500,000 from the apartment he had occupied since 14 May and also stole US$1,500 from John Franklin Jones, a guest in apartment 714 and an employee of the North American bank Northeast. Jones told the police that the robbers were three mulattoes, and his testimony allowed the criminals to be arrested.

=== Investigation ===
The murder occurred less than 48 hours before Pinto was set to testify in a CPI (Comissão Parlamentar de Inquérito, Parliamentary Commission of Inquiry) that would investigate suspicions that governor Pinto was responsible for misappropriating funds for the construction of the Maternity Canal with resources from the Fundo de Garantia do Tempo de Serviço (FGTS) in a case where former minister Antônio Rogério Magri was mentioned, but whose involvement was never confirmed. There were also suspicions about Acre party disputes and even "archive burning". The police concluded that it was a latrocínio (robbery followed by death), as there was evidence of a physical fight between Pinto and his murderers, as Pinto was glanced by a bullet to the head before being shot in the heart.

There were new investigations into the case in 1993 and 2003, and it was the target of a CPI of its own in 1992 when Gilson José dos Santos, one of the accused in the killing of Pinto, said that he had received money to commit the crime.

== Personal life ==
Pinto was married to Fátima Barbosa de Almeida, with whom he had three children: Pedro Veras de Almeida Neto, Rodrigo Barbosa de Almeida Pinto and Nuana Naira Barbosa de Almeida.

Political offices
Preceded by Édison Cadaxo	Governor of Acre; 1991–1992	Succeeded by Romildo Magalhães
