= Dazaranha =

Brazilian rock band

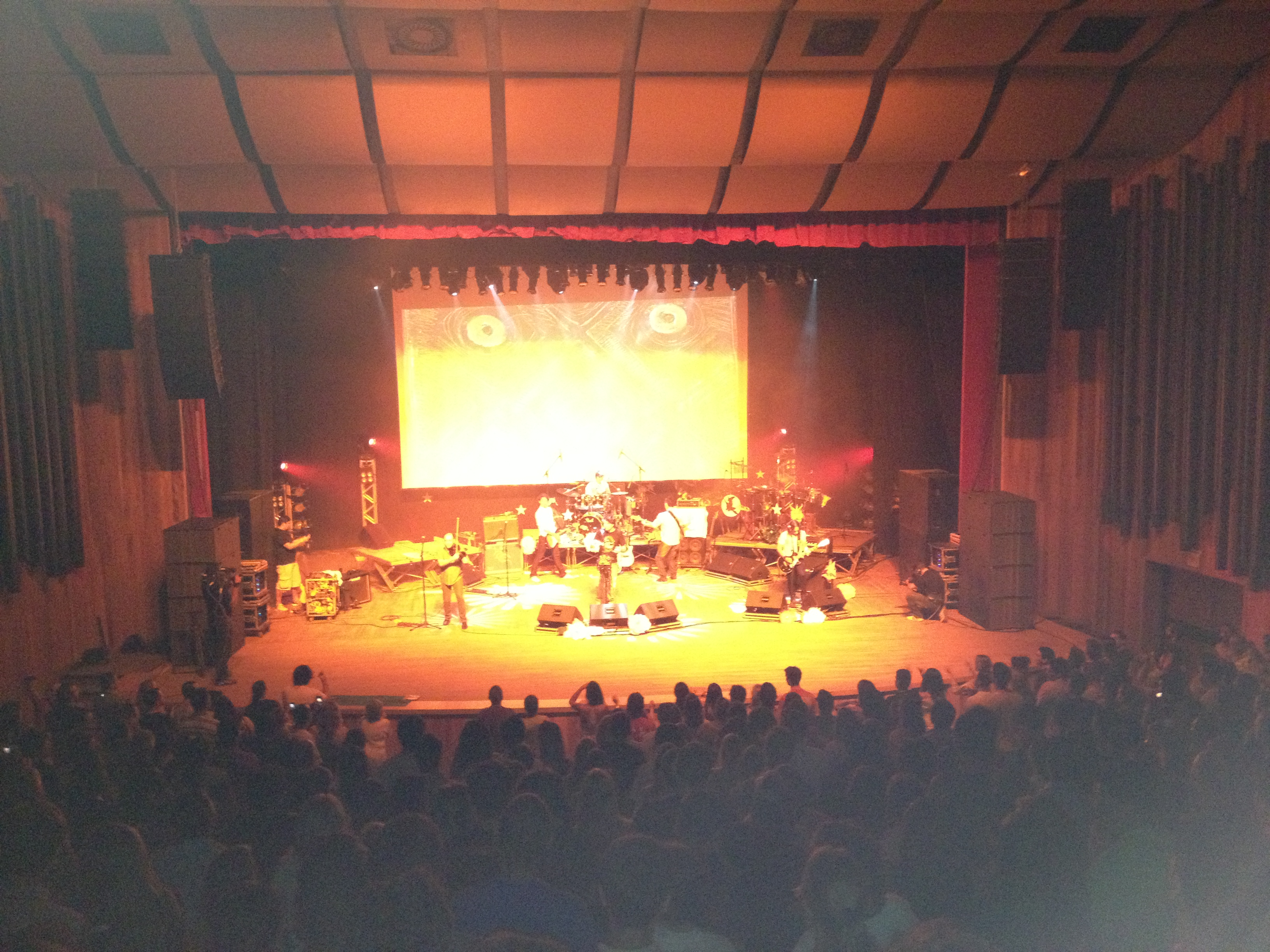
- Dazaranha performing live in Florianópolis, in December 2012.

Background information
- Origin: Florianópolis, Santa Catarina, Brazil
- Genres: Reggae rock, Alternative rock
- Years active: 1992–present
- Labels: UMG
- Members: Adauto; Chico Martins; Fernando; Gerry; Moriel
- Past members: Adriano Barvik; Gazu; Zé Caetano
- Website: dazaranha.com

Dazaranha (also known simply as Daza) is a Brazilian rock band, formed in Florianópolis in the early 1990s. Its members are Adauto (bass), Chico Martins (lead guitar and vocals), Fernando (violin and backing vocalist), Gazu (lead vocals), Gerry (percussion), Moriel (rhythm guitar and backing vocalist). The band combined reggae and rock, with strong participation arrangements violin.

It's considered the band with higher expression in the music scene in Santa Catarina.

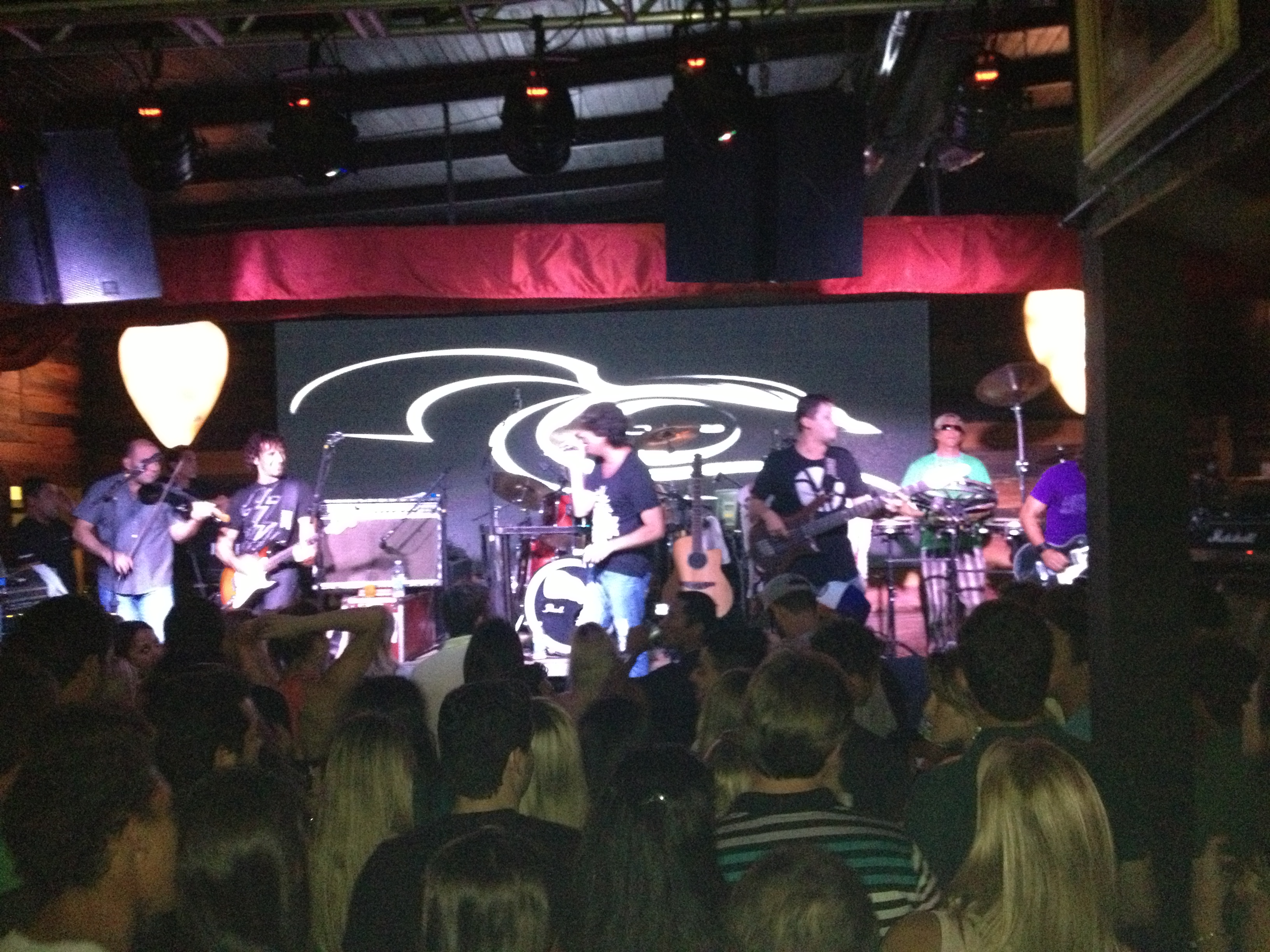
Dazaranha concert in 2013

== Discography ==
#	Album	Released	Guest appearances	Label
Ilha de Todos os Sons		1994	Retroprojetor appearances in compilation album	RBS Discos
1º	Seja Bem Vindo	1996		RBS Discos
2º	Tribo da Lua	1998	Jorge Ben Jor, Luiz Carlini, Baixinho	Atração Fonográfica
3º	Nossa Barulheira	2004		Atração Fonográfica
4º	Paralisa	2007	Rô Conceição, Guilherme Ribeiro, Macarrão, Daniel Lucena, Valdir Agostinho	Antídoto
5º	Ao Vivo	2010	Armandinho	Universal Music
6º	Daza	2014	Carlos Trilha	Paravox
7º	Afinar as Rezas	2016		Paravox

=== Singles ===
Year	Single	Album
1996	"Novos Ditados"	Seja Bem Vindo
1998	"Vagabundo Confesso"	Tribo da Lua
2004	"Salão de Festa a Vapor"	Nossa Barulheira
2007	"Ô Mané"	Paralisa

== Videography ==
- Dazaranha Ao Vivo (2010) – live show recorded at the CIC (Integrated Culture Center), in Florianópolis.

== Awards ==
- 2006: Claro Independent Music Award – The Best Pop Album

== Members ==
=== Forming ===
- Chico Martins – Lead guitar and Vocals
- Adauto – Bass
- Fernando – Violin, Lead guitar and Bass
- Moriel – rhythm guitar and Vocals
- Gerry – Percussion

=== Past members ===
- Adriano – Drums
- Gazu – Vocals and Guitar
- Zé Caetano – Drums

=== Support band ===
- João Basañez – Drums

Trio Santo Amaro

- Leandro – Saxophone
- Paulinho – Trumpet
- Hemerson – Trombone

=== Trio Santo Amaro ===
In 2007, during the production and recording of Paralisa album, the Dazaranha modernize and innovate the already established band style by showing in his songs the strong brass instrument presence of Trio Santo Amaro, who has since joined the band.

The Trio Santo Amaro received this nomenclature from members of Dazaranha because the musicians living in Santo Amaro da Imperatriz and they are formed musically in the Musical Society and Cultural Santo Amaro.
