= Guaratuba child murders =

1992 child murders in Guaratuba, Brazil

The Guaratuba child murders, also popularly known as the witches of Guaratuba or the Evandro case, is a series of child disappearances that happened in the city of Guaratuba, Brazil, in 1992, some of which were later confirmed as being cases of kidnapping followed by murder. It is one of the longest legal cases in Brazil, and in 2016 its official archive had 60 volumes with over twenty thousand pages.

The case is now known for having involved multiple complex factors, such as a rivalry dispute between the military and civil police, alleged confessions under torture and kidnapping, as well as presence of political motivations to interfere in the legal case.

== History ==
On April 6, 1992, while walking home from school, Evandro Ramos Caetano, a 6-year-old boy, disappeared mysteriously. Five days later, his body was found in a thicket in Guaratuba. Evandro's throat was slashed. He was bruised and beaten, and his eyes, ears, genitals, and hands had been cut off. His intestines, liver, and heart were missing. The question of whether that body was Evandro's or not was questioned for years until many biological tests (DNA and dental arch tests) were conducted.

The public prosecutor's office of Paraná indicted Celina Abagge, the wife of Guaratuba's mayor, and her daughter, Beatriz Cordeiro Abbagge, as the ones who requested the kidnapping and murder of Evandro, with the intent to use the corpse in a human sacrifice ritual. The pai-de-santo Oswaldo Marcineiro, the painter Vicente de Paula Ferreira, and the artisan Davi dos Santos Soares were indicted for performing the ritual. Francisco Sérgio Cristofolini and Airton Bardelli dos Santos were also indicted for participating in the crime.

Some of the indicted confessed to also being involved in the kidnapping of Leandro Bossi (8 years old), which led to speculations that they might have been involved in the disappearance of six to eight other children in Guaratuba in the same year, but at that time police claimed to have no evidence of such involvement.

On March 23, 1998, Beatriz and Celina were tried in court for the first time in the longest jury in Brazilian justice history. It lasted for 34 days, and the defendants were deemed innocent. In 1999, the jury was invalidated, and the trial restarted in May 2011, in which Beatriz was deemed guilty and received a sentence of 21 years in prison. In 2016, her sentence was juridically forgiven due to her being the mother of a minor.

Osvaldo Marcineiro, Vicente de Paula Ferreira, and Davi dos Santos Soares were convicted in 2004, whereas Francisco Sérgio Cristofolini and Airton Bardelli dos Santos were acquitted in 2005.

== Media coverage (2010–2020) ==
Projeto Humanos ("project humans" in English) is an audio documentary about the case, created by professor and journalist Ivan Mizanzuk. It exposes information that is publicly available in the files annexed to the court case process, (Note: In Brazil, access to such data can be requested to a judge in a somewhat lengthy process. See the brazilian law of access to public information.) which include transcriptions and audio recordings of all court proceedings, as well as transcriptions of investigations and artifacts found therein.

Due to the large amount of attention received by Projeto Humanos, in 2019 Rede Globo announced that it would make a television miniseries based on the audio documentary.

On May 13, 2021, the docuseries The Evandro Case: A Devilish Plot was released by Globoplay. Two months after the release of the series, an extra episode was released with exclusive testimonials from important people involved in the investigation showing the impact that the production had on the lives of those involved in the case.

== See also ==
- Altamira child emasculations, a related crime occurred in another state, Pará
