= Mega-Sena =

Brazilian lottery

- Region: Brazil
- First draw: March 1996
- Operator: Caixa Econômica Federal
- Highest jackpot: R$ 1.091.357.286,52 (~US$ 221,6 million)
- Odds of winning jackpot: 1 in 50,063,860 (Sena - 6/6), 1 in 154.518 (Quina - 5/6), 1 in 2.332 (Quadra - 4/6)

The Mega-Sena is the largest lottery in Brazil, organised by the Caixa Econômica Federal bank since March 1996.

== Drawings ==
The draws of the Mega-Sena are held three times a week, on Tuesday at 21:00 Brasilia time, Thursday at 21:00, and Sunday at 11:00 Brasilia time. The drawings consist of picking balls from 2 spinning spherical cages. The drawings consist of picking 6 unique balls from a single spinning spherical cage containing numbers ranging from 01 to 60. When 6 unique 2-digit numbers are drawn, the drawing is concluded.

== Betting ==
Contestants may bet in the range of 6 to 15 numbers, out of 60, and scoring 4, 5 or 6 points will grant prizes. Bet prices escalate depending on how many possible groups of 6 numbers exist within the numbers chosen, so they vary between R$ 6,00 for 6 numbers (only 1 game possible) to R$ 232.560,00 for 20 numbers (38.760 games possible). The chances of winning the biggest prize when placing a minimum bet are 1 in 50,063,860.

Contestants can choose to play a "Surpresinha" entry, which will generate their numbers randomly. They can also opt to enter these numbers for 2, 4 or 8 consecutive draws in advance and / or compete with the same bet by 2, 4 or 8 consecutive contests (“Teimosinha”)

There is also official syndicates ("Bolão") by the Caixa. These syndicates allow you to create a larger bet and share it between your family and / or friends in various share amounts / fractions ("cotas"). For Mega-Sena, the minimum syndicate bet can be R$10.00, with the minimum share of the being R$4.00, and the number of participants in the syndicate can be between a minimum of 2 and a maximum of 100.

== Prizes ==
Raw prizes correspond to 46% of raw income from bets. Out of this figure:

- 35% will go to people who scored 6 numbers or, if nobody scores 6 numbers, it'll accumulate for the next drawing.
- 19% will go to people who scored 5 numbers.
- 19% will go to people who scored 4 numbers.
- 22% will accumulate for a special drawing occurring once every 5 times.
- 5% will accumulate for Mega Da Virada, the special New Years drawing (see below).

Income tax will deduct 13.8% from all the previous items. The net value for prizes is actually 32.2% of lottery earnings.

Winners have 90 days to claim their prizes. Prizes below R$800 can be claimed at a lottery house. Prizes that are at least R$1.903,98 must be claimed at the Caixa Econômica Federal bank. If the 90-day period expires, prize money is transferred to the national treasury and invested in educational programs.

== Beneficiaries ==
The other 54% of lottery income is spent on costs and then redistributed to several social programmes.

== Mega da Virada ==
A special drawing called Mega da Virada is held on New Year's Eve every year. The drawing is extremely popular among Brazilians because of its large jackpot. Regular Mega-Sena draws throughout the year put aside 5% of the proceeds for Mega da Virada. Record Mega da Virada jackpot is the R$ 1,09 billion (~US$ 221,6 million) jackpot from the 2025 drawing. Unlike a regular draw, the Mega da Virada jackpot doesn't accumulate even if nobody scores 6 numbers. It instead goes to people who scored 5 numbers.

== See also ==
- Lotofácil
