= Professor Paulo Neves de Carvalho Government School =

Coordinates: 19°55′35″S 43°55′34″W

Professor Paulo Neves de Carvalho Government School (Escola de Governo Paulo Neves de Carvalho) is a Brazilian state funded single institution of higher education, based in the city of Belo Horizonte, Minas Gerais. The school offers undergraduate, masters, specialization and extension programs in the area of Public Administration. The School of Government is part of the João Pinheiro Foundation, and is linked to the government of Minas Gerais through the Secretary of State for Planning and Management (SEPLAG).

The School of Government of the João Pinheiro Foundation was established in 1992 with the mission to promote the modernization and professionalization of the government and to improve the training of technical staff at the local, state and federal levels, promoting new management techniques and developing studies and research in public administration.

== Public Administration Program ==
The Public Administration Program, known as CSAP, guarantees its graduates the automatic naming to the initial level of the career of specialist in Public Policy and Government Management, which integrates the structure of the Executive Branch of the State of Minas Gerais. The CSAP is the only university in the country with this feature. The course lasts eight semesters and, in addition to free tuition, each student receives a monthly bursary equivalent to the Brazilian minimum wage.

In 2006, the School of Government was considered the best administration program in Brazil according to the Ministry of education. Since then, it has consistently scored 5 on the IGC (General Course Index of the Ministry of Education), the highest possible score.

The School of Government of the João Pinheiro Foundation was one of only 27 Brazilian institutions of higher education to score 5 (maximum) in the IGC released in 2011, and it was considered the 9th best among the 2.136 institutions evaluated. In the IGC 2013, the most current one, the School of Government has kept the highest score and was considered the 11th best among the 2.023 institutions evaluated.
