= Fundo de Garantia do Tempo de Serviço =

The Fundo de Garantia do Tempo de Serviço (FGTS) (English: Length-of-Service Guarantee Fund) is a federal social insurance program in Brazil that protects workers dismissed without just cause.

At the beginning of every month, employers contribute a percentage of the employee's salary, usually 8%, into a banking account registered at the Caixa Econômica Federal. For apprenticeships, the percentage is reduced to 2%, and in the case of domestic workers, it rises to 11.2%.

The fund was created on September 13, 1966 by the then-President Castelo Branco during the period of the military dictatorship in Brazil. Its creation was part of a series of institutional reforms and economic adjustments enacted after the 1964 Brazilian coup d'état, and it has since been amended several times.

== History ==
Until the creation of the FGTS, the so-called "ten-year stability" (estabilidade decenal) was the only protection workers had against being fired without just cause. After acquiring this "stability," the employee's contract could only be terminated if just cause could be established following an investigation of the employer's claims of misconduct against the employee.

Nonetheless, workers who had only accumulated one year of service were still entitled to severance pay equivalent to one month's salary for each year worked. Upon reaching ten years of service, the value of the severance doubled. Some companies, of their own accord, put aside about a twelfth of the worker's salary every pay period in order to be able to cover the cost. However, even if this precautionary measure was taken, many companies understood that the cost of the severance pay would still be extremely high. Thus, in practice, workers were often fired shortly before they reached ten years of service, or they simply did not receive the severance pay they were entitled to and were forced to go to court to claim the amounts they were entitled to.

This arrangement was considered to be an onerous burden on companies, since, according to them, it did not benefit either the employer or the employee. The government also increasingly affirmed this point of view, drawing particular attention to the practice of companies preventing workers from reaching the necessary ten years. The Fundo de Garantia do Tempo de Serviço (FGTS), created on September 13, 1966, was their solution to this predicament. The new regime did not do away with the previous system, but instead provided an alternative to it on an opt-in basis. Under the FGTS, employers would be required to deposit 8% of the worker's salary into a fund, regardless of whether the employee had chosen to opt-in. These funds would be subject to low interest rates and inflation adjustments, and were originally used to finance investments in housing and infrastructure, especially in sanitation.

The ten-year stability regime was eventually abolished when a new constitution came into effect in 1988 following the collapse of the military dictatorship and the subsequent establishment of the Sixth Brazilian Republic. From that point on, all workers with permanent employment contracts were obliged to opt-in to the FGTS.

== Criticism ==
Among the most common criticisms of the fund was that its yield was lower than that of savings accounts. While the fund did get adjusted for inflation, the calculation was based on the referential rate, not the national consumer price index (Índice Nacional de Preços ao Consumidor Amplo). In response to this issue, a new measure was enacted in 2017 to allow for profit sharing.

In December 2016, the Minister of Finance confirmed that the government was studying the possibility of allowing for the use of FGTS funds to pay down debts. The measure was not well received by Proteste, the largest consumer organization in Latin America, due to its purported negative impact on consumers, especially those who were already in debt.

In 2017, President Michel Temer signed a decree allowing withdrawals from inactive FGTS accounts. According to the Caixa Econômica Federal, some 88% of the eligible amount has already been removed. As for the reason behind such a high rate of withdrawal, economist Cecilia Machado suggests that "It is not known whether a withdrawal occurs because these are savings that the worker would not like to maintain, or if the withdrawals are justified by the low rate of return of the FGTS...[But the FGTS] is an imposing instrument of the government, which cannot be chosen by the worker, constituting a mechanism of financial repression."

== Certification ==
The FGTS Negative Certificate attests to the regular status of employers in relation to the collection of the FGTS, meaning it can only be granted to a company when it is up-to-date with its labor rights obligations.

The FGTS Regularity Certificate (CRF) is a document issued by the Caixa Econômica Federal attesting that a company is up-to-date with its employees' payments and also up-to-date with its social security obligations. A CRF is required in select situations, such as when one wants to withdraw from an inactive FGTS account or prove the non-existence of a relationship with an employee, or when a company wants to participate in government procurement. The certificate can also be requested in case of a tax audit by the Ministry of Labor.
