= Romildo Magalhães =

Brazilian politician (1946–2024)

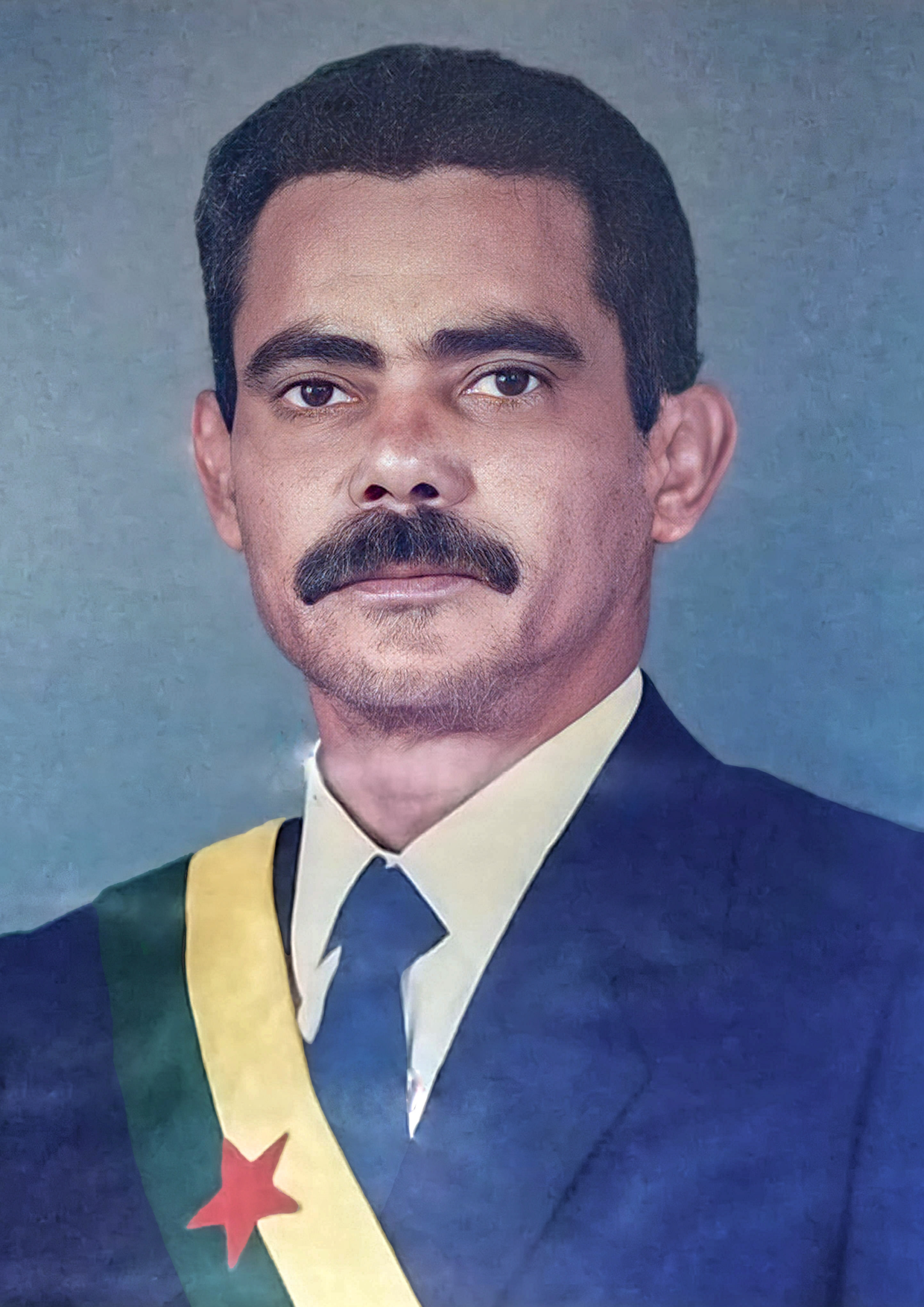

Governor of Acre
- In office 17 May 1992 – 1 January 1995
- Preceded by: Edmundo Pinto
- Succeeded by: Orleir Cameli

Vice-governor of Acre
- In office 15 March 1991 – 17 May 1992
- Preceded by: Édison Simão Cadaxo
- Succeeded by: Labib Murad

Mayor of Feijó
- In office 1 January 1997 – 31 December 2000
- Preceded by: Cláudio Braga Leite
- Succeeded by: Francimar Fernandes de Albuquerque
- In office 1979–1982
- Preceded by: Aurélio de Sousa Braga
- Succeeded by: Aurélio de Sousa Braga

Personal details
- Born: Romildo Magalhães da Silva; 9 April 1946; Feijó, Acre, Brazil
- Died: 14 July 2024 (aged 78); Rio Branco, Acre, Brazil
- Political party: PDS; PPR

Romildo Magalhães da Silva (9 April 1946 – 14 July 2024) was a Brazilian politician who briefly served as the governor of the state of Acre from 1991 to 1992. He was initially the vice-governor, but was elevated to the post after the assassination of then-governor Edmundo Pinto. Magalhães was succeeded by Orleir Cameli. Prior to entering state politics, he was the mayor of the city of Feijó from 1978 to 1982, and later served again from 1997 to 2000. Magalhães would later be imprisoned on corruption charges due to illegal usage of public coffers and administrative impropriety.

Magalhães died on 14 July 2024 in the capital of Rio Branco after having been hospitalized due to diabetes complications. He was 78.
