= Gazu, Sistan and Baluchestan =

Gazu گزو
- Village
- Location within Iran
- Coordinates: 28°28′45″N 61°30′04″E
- Country: Iran
- Province: Sistan and Baluchestan
- County: Khash
- Bakhsh: Central
- Rural District: Poshtkuh

Population (2006)
  - Total: 329
- Time zone: UTC+3:30 (IRST)
  - Summer (DST): UTC+4:30 (IRDT)

Gazu (Persian: گزو, also Romanized as Gazū; also known as Ḩājjīābād, Gaxu, Gazo, and Gazook) is a village in Poshtkuh Rural District, in the Central District of Khash County, Sistan and Baluchestan Province, Iran. At the 2006 census, its population was 329, in 65 families.
