= Francisco das Chagas Rodrigues de Brito =

Brazilian serial killer and sex offender (born 1964)

- Born: 1964 (age 61–62); Caxias, state of Maranhão, Brazil
- Convictions: Doubly qualified homicide, abuse against dead bodies, concealment of corpses
- Penalty: 580 years imprisonment

Details
- Victims: 30–42
- Country: Brazil
- States: Maranhão, Pará
- Date apprehended: December 2003

Francisco das Chagas Rodrigues de Brito (born 1964) is a Brazilian former mechanic, serial killer, and sex offender deemed responsible in court for several homicides against children in the state of Maranhão, which included emasculation of the victims and abuse of their corpses. His guilt was proven when experts found several bodies, as well as limbs and fragments of children who had disappeared, in his residence. Evidence points to him as the person responsible for the Altamira child emasculations, a series of crimes with the same modus operandi. These crimes occurred in the municipality of Altamira, in Pará, and the accused lived in that region for more than 10 years. Francisco das Chagas Rodrigues de Brito is considered one of the most prolific serial killers in the country.

== Crimes ==
The case of poor children being killed in the capital city of São Luís was brought to light in 2004 with the murder of minor Jonahtan dos Santos, who, before disappearing, had said that he would meet with the mechanic. The suspect was arrested on suspicion of killing Jonahtan, and 16 other boys, leading investigators to murders dating back to 1997, also in the municipalities of Paço do Lumiar and São José de Ribamar. Two bones were also found on the grounds of the house in which he lived.

The lack of clarification on these homicides, carelessly treated for over the years, led Brazil to be denounced by organizations at the Inter-American Court of Human Rights of the OAS.

Francisco das Chagas Rodrigues de Brito's crimes also extended to the state of Pará, with a suspected total of 42 children being killed and emasculated.

In his crimes, the murderer, who exhibited psychopathic characteristics (sought to justify himself, lacked pity, and lied), sexually abused his victims and, after killing them, mutilated them by cutting off their ears and fingers and then emasculating them.

== See also ==
- Anísio Ferreira de Sousa
- List of serial killers in Brazil
- List of serial killers by number of victims
