= Anísio Ferreira de Sousa =

Brazilian doctor controversially convicted of murder

- Born: Anísio Ferreira de Sousa; 1950; Brazil
- Died: 2000 (aged 49–50)
- Conviction: Murder
- Penalty: 77 years in prison

Details
- Country: Brazil

Anísio Ferreira de Sousa was a Brazilian doctor determined by the courts to be responsible for several homicides against children in the countryside of the state of Pará. De Sousa was indicted based on controversial testimony from an evangelical pastor who claimed to have witnessed a "satanic cult" at his residence. At the same event, according to this witness, De Sousa said prayers to the "god of darkness".

During the judicial process, no evidence was presented linking De Sousa to any of the crimes of which he was accused. During this period, the witness also repeatedly denied, reaffirmed, and altered his statements in court. Despite this, based only on the testimony of this witness, the Pará court condemned De Sousa as guilty of the murder of three children and the attempted murder of two others.

== Crimes ==
Between 1989 and 1992, boys disappeared around the town of Altamira. The boys were sexually mutilated and murdered. De Sousa was sentenced to 77 years in prison.

== See also ==
- Francisco das Chagas Rodrigues de Brito
- Satanic panic
- List of serial killers in Brazil
